= 2022 European Athletics Championships – Women's triple jump =

Women's triple jump at the 2022 European Athletics Championships
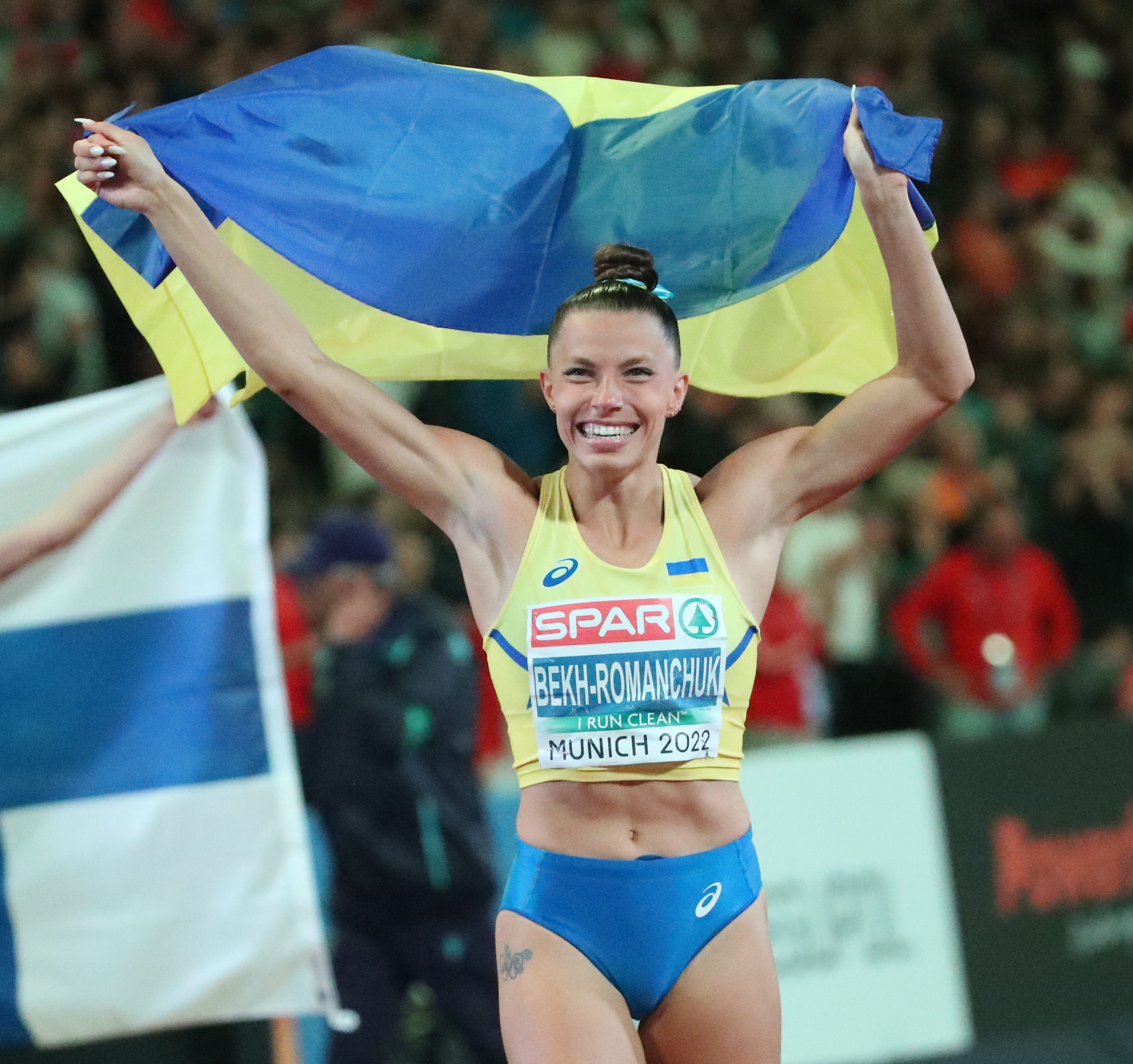
- Maryna Bekh-Romanchuk shortly after winning the final.
- Venue: Olympiastadion
- Location: Munich
- Dates: 17 August (qualification); 19 August (final)
- Competitors: 25 from 19 nations
- Winning distance: 15.02

Medalists
gold medal	Maryna Bekh-Romanchuk	Ukraine
silver medal	Kristiina Mäkelä	Finland
bronze medal	Hanna Knyazyeva-Minenko	Israel

The women's triple jump at the 2022 European Athletics Championships took place at the Olympiastadion on 17 and 19 August.

== Records ==
Standing records prior to the 2022 European Athletics Championships
World record	Yulimar Rojas (VEN)	15.74 m	Tokyo, Japan	1 August 2021
European record	Inessa Kravets (UKR)	15.50 m	Gothenburg, Sweden	10 August 1995
Championship record	Tatyana Lebedeva (RUS)	15.15 m	Gothenburg, Sweden	9 August 2006
World Leading	Yulimar Rojas (VEN)	15.47 m	Eugene, United States	18 July 2022
Europe Leading	Maryna Bekh-Romanchuk (UKR)	14.59 m	Monaco	10 August 2022

== Schedule ==
Date	Time	Round
17 August 2022	12:35	Qualification
19 August 2022	20:55	Final

All times are local times (UTC+2)

== Results ==
=== Qualification ===
Qualification: 14.40 m (Q) or best 12 performers (q).

Rank	Group	Name	Nationality	#1	#2	#3	Result	Note
1	B	Neele Eckhardt-Noack	Germany	14.53			14.53	Q, PB
2	A	Patrícia Mamona	Portugal	14.45			14.45	Q, SB
3	A	Maryna Bekh-Romanchuk	Ukraine	14.18	14.36	–	14.36	q
4	B	Naomi Metzger	Great Britain	14.24	–	–	14.24	q
5	B	Kristiina Mäkelä	Finland	x	14.11	x	14.11	q
6	A	Hanna Minenko	Israel	x	14.06	x	14.06	q
7	A	Elena Panțuroiu	Romania	13.55	14.00	x	14.00	q, SB
8	A	Senni Salminen	Finland	13.90	x	13.87	13.90	q
9	B	Ottavia Cestonaro	Italy	13.39	x	13.86	13.86	q
10	A	Dovilė Kilty	Lithuania	13.83	13.65	13.77	13.83	q
11	A	Aleksandra Nacheva	Bulgaria	13.73	13.42	x	13.73	q
12	B	Spyridoula Karydi	Greece	13.49	13.71	13.40	13.71	q
13	A	Yekaterina Sariyeva	Azerbaijan	13.66	x	x	13.66	
14	A	Dariya Derkach	Italy	x	13.65	x	13.65	
15	B	Aina Grikšaitė	Lithuania	x	13.62	11.69	13.62	
16	A	Kristin Gierisch	Germany	x	11.88	13.59	13.59	
17	B	Rūta Kate Lasmane	Latvia	x	13.39	13.49	13.49	
18	A	Gizem Akgöz	Turkey	x	13.40	x	13.40	
19	A	Adrianna Szóstak	Poland	13.22	x	13.36	13.36	
20	B	Maja Åskag	Sweden	x	13.23	x	13.23	
21	B	Karolina Młodawska	Poland	x	12.87	x	12.87	
22	B	Jessie Maduka	Germany	12.11	x	x	12.11	
	A	Paola Borović	Croatia	x	x	x	NM	
	B	Tuğba Danışmaz	Turkey	x	x	x	NM	
	B	Neja Filipič	Slovenia	x	x	x	NM	

=== Final ===
Rank	Name	Nationality	#1	#2	#3	#4	#5	#6	Result	Note
1st place, gold medalist(s)	Maryna Bekh-Romanchuk	Ukraine	14.81	14.68	x	14.80	15.02	x	15.02	EL
2nd place, silver medalist(s)	Kristiina Mäkelä	Finland	14.01	14.64	x	13.93	14.34	x	14.64	NR
3rd place, bronze medalist(s)	Hanna Minenko	Israel	14.20	x	14.45	13.97	x	x	14.45	
4	Neele Eckhardt-Noack	Germany	14.12	14.39	x	x	14.43	14.40	14.43	
5	Patrícia Mamona	Portugal	14.26	14.15	14.39	14.41	14.15	13.70	14.41	
6	Naomi Metzger	Great Britain	14.33	x	13.96	14.22	13.77	14.25	14.33	
7	Senni Salminen	Finland	14.13	x	x	x	x	x	14.13	
8	Elena Panțuroiu	Romania	13.49	13.80	14.01	x	13.83	13.82	14.01	SB
9	Spyridoula Karydi	Greece	13.32	13.10	13.54				13.54	
10	Ottavia Cestonaro	Italy	13.15	x	13.48				13.48	
11	Aleksandra Nacheva	Bulgaria	x	x	13.33				13.33	
12	Dovilė Kilty	Lithuania	13.27	x	13.04				13.27	
