= 2017 European Athletics U23 Championships – Women's long jump =

The women's long jump event at the 2017 European Athletics U23 Championships was held in Bydgoszcz, Poland, at Zdzisław Krzyszkowiak Stadium on 15 and 16 July.

== Medalists ==
Gold	Yanis David; France
Silver	Anna Bühler; Germany
Bronze	Maryna Bekh; Ukraine

== Results ==
=== Qualification ===
15 July

Qualification rule: 6.23 (Q) or the 12 best results (q) qualified for the final.

Rank	Group	Name	Nationality	#1	#2	#3	Results	Notes
1	B	Maryna Bekh	Ukraine	6.63w			6.63w	Q
2	B	Anna Bühler	Germany	6.62w			6.62w	Q
3	A	Yanis David	France	6.21	6.13	6.45	6.45	Q, =SB
4	B	Hanne Maudens	Belgium	6.44			6.44	Q, SB
5	B	Evelise Veiga	Portugal	6.42			6.42	Q
6	A	Jogailė Petrokaitė	Lithuania	6.15w	6.21	6.39	6.39	Q, SB
7	A	Martha Traoré	Denmark	6.09	6.35		6.35	Q, SB
8	B	Ottavia Cestonaro	Italy	6.07	6.35		6.35	Q, PB
9	B	Rougui Sow	France	6.34			6.34	Q
10	A	Neja Filipič	Slovenia	6.33w			6.33w	Q
10	B	Nadia Akpana Assa	Norway	6.33			6.33	Q
10	B	Sarah McCarthy	Ireland	6.33			6.33	Q, PB
13	A	Emilia Kjellberg	Sweden	x	x	6.24	6.24	Q, PB
14	A	Teresa Carvalho	Portugal	6.15	6.20	5.96	6.20	SB
15	B	Magdalena Żebrowska	Poland	6.19	6.03	6.14	6.19	
16	A	Beatrice Fiorese	Italy	5.98	x	6.17	6.17	
17	A	Anne-Mari Lehtiö	Finland	5.94	6.06	6.15	6.15	
18	B	Izabela Włodarska	Poland	x	x	6.15	6.15	
19	B	Paola Borović	Croatia	x	x	6.14	6.14	
20	A	Nastassia Miatselskaya	Belarus	6.10	5.99	x	6.10	
21	B	Eszter Bajnok	Hungary	x	2.95	6.07	6.07	SB
22	A	Filipa Fotopoulou	Cyprus	5.91	5.88	6.05w	6.05w	
23	A	Fatima Diame	Spain	6.03	5.59	6.03	6.03	
24	A	Natalia Chacińska	Poland	5.84	5.88	6.01w	6.01w	
25	A	Elena Andreea Panțuroiu	Romania	5.98	4.37	5.78	5.98	
26	B	Karina Lipeckaja	Lithuania	x	5.87w	x	5.87w	

=== Final ===
16 July

Rank	Name	Nationality	#1	#2	#3	#4	#5	#6	Result	Notes
1st place, gold medalist(s)	Yanis David	France	6.35	6.43	x	–	x	6.56	6.56	PB
2nd place, silver medalist(s)	Anna Bühler	Germany	x	6.26	6.22	6.40	6.28	6.50	6.50	
3rd place, bronze medalist(s)	Maryna Bekh	Ukraine	x	6.48	x	6.48	x	6.08	6.48	
4	Rougui Sow	France	6.46	6.30	6.46	x	x	5.27	6.46	
5	Evelise Veiga	Portugal	6.22	6.38	6.43	6.02	x	5.96	6.43	
6	Neja Filipič	Slovenia	x	6.42	6.06	6.42	x	6.24	6.42	
7	Martha Traoré	Denmark	x	6.16	6.31	6.11	–	x	6.31	
8	Nadia Akpana Assa	Norway	6.25	5.04	6.26	6.27	6.29w	6.18	6.29w	
9	Jogailė Petrokaitė	Lithuania	6.23	6.12	x				6.23	
10	Ottavia Cestonaro	Italy	6.00	6.22	5.83				6.22	
11	Sarah McCarthy	Ireland	6.21	5.89	6.02				6.21	
12	Hanne Maudens	Belgium	x	x	6.12				6.12	
13	Emilia Kjellberg	Sweden	x	5.98	x				5.98	
