= 2024 European Athletics Championships – Women's triple jump =

Women's triple jump at the 2024 European Athletics Championships
- Venue: Stadio Olimpico
- Location: Rome
- Dates: 7 June (qualification); 9 June (final)
- Competitors: 28 from 16 nations
- Winning distance: 14.85 m =EL

Medalists
gold medal	Ana Peleteiro-Compaoré	Spain
silver medal	Tuğba Danışmaz	Turkey
bronze medal	Ilionis Guillaume	France

The women's triple jump at the 2024 European Athletics Championships took place at the Stadio Olimpico on 7 and 9 June.

== Records ==
Standing records prior to the 2024 European Athletics Championships
World record	Yulimar Rojas (VEN)	15.74 m	Tokyo, Japan	1 August 2021
European record	Inessa Kravets (UKR)	15.50 m	Gothenburg, Sweden	10 August 1995
Championship record	Tatyana Lebedeva (RUS)	15.15 m	Gothenburg, Sweden	9 August 2006
World Leading	Thea Lafond (DMA)	15.01 m	Glasgow, United Kingdom	3 March 2024
Europe Leading	Viyaleta Skvartsova (BLR)	14.85 m	Sochi, Russia	22 May 2024

== Schedule ==
Date	Time	Round
7 June 2024	11:10	Qualification
9 June 2024	21:21	Final

All times are local times (UTC+2)

== Results ==
=== Qualification ===
Qualification: 14.10 m (Q) or best 12 performers (q)

Rank	Group	Name	Nationality	#1	#2	#3	Result	Note
1	A	Aleksandra Nacheva	Bulgaria	13.86	14.29		14.29	Q, PB
2	A	Tuğba Danışmaz	Turkey	14.27			14.27	Q
3	A	Ana Peleteiro-Compaoré	Spain	14.21			14.21	Q
4	B	Florentina Iusco	Romania	x	14.11		14.11	Q
5	B	Dariya Derkach	Italy	14.10			14.10	Q, SB
6	A	Diana Ana Maria Ion	Romania	14.09	11.83	13.99	14.09	q, SB
7	B	Anna Krasutska	Ukraine	13.72	14.00	13.58	14.00	q
8	A	Ilionis Guillaume	France	14.00	13.08	13.64	14.00	q
9	B	Olha Korsun	Ukraine	13.83	13.99	13.90	13.99	q
10	B	Neja Filipič	Slovenia	11.51	13.35	13.98	13.98	q
11	B	Kristin Gierisch	Germany	13.62	x	13.91	13.91	q, SB
12	B	Gabriela Petrova	Bulgaria	13.86	13.39	13.77	13.86	q
13	A	Oxana Koreneva	Greece	x	13.86	13.73	13.86	=SB
14	A	Kristiina Mäkelä	Finland	13.67	13.76	13.74	13.76	
15	B	Maja Åskag	Sweden	13.69	13.74	x	13.74	
16	A	Aina Grikšaitė	Lithuania	13.71	x	13.11	13.71	
17	A	Dovilė Kilty	Lithuania	13.54	13.69	13.32	13.69	
18	B	Maria Purtsa	Greece	13.58	13.51	13.69	13.69	SB
19	B	Diana Zagainova	Lithuania	x	x	13.64	13.64	
20	B	Elena Andreea Taloş	Romania	13.54	13.59	13.54	13.59	
21	A	Senni Salminen	Finland	13.54	x	13.10	13.54	
22	B	Gizem Akgöz	Turkey	x	x	13.47	13.47	
23	B	Adrianna Laskowska	Poland	x	13.14	13.26	13.26	
24	B	Jessica Kähärä	Finland	13.09	13.13	13.21	13.21	
25	A	Yekaterina Sariyeva	Azerbaijan	x	12.93	x	12.93	
	A	Mariya Siney	Ukraine	x	r		NM	
	A	Hanna Minenko	Israel	x	x	r	NM	
	A	Eva Pepelnak	Slovenia				DNS	

=== Final ===
The final was started at on 9 June at 21:03.

Rank	Name	Nationality	#1	#2	#3	#4	#5	#6	Result	Note
1st place, gold medalist(s)	Ana Peleteiro-Compaoré	Spain	14.37	14.46	14.52	14.85	x	14.47	14.85	=EL
2nd place, silver medalist(s)	Tuğba Danışmaz	Turkey	14.29	14.57	x	x	14.12	14.38	14.57	NR
3rd place, bronze medalist(s)	Ilionis Guillaume	France	13.91	14.23	14.10	13.72	x	14.43	14.43	PB
4	Aleksandra Nacheva	Bulgaria	11.96	14.35	12.51	11.99	13.89	12.66	14.35	PB
5	Diana Ana Maria Ion	Romania	14.16	13.87	14.11	14.13	14.15	14.23	14.23	PB
6	Gabriela Petrova	Bulgaria	14.16	14.16	x	13.83	14.01	13.93	14.16	
7	Neja Filipič	Slovenia	x	x	13.85	13.72	x	14.12	14.12	
8	Dariya Derkach	Italy	14.03	13.83	13.76	13.67	13.67	13.73	14.03	
9	Florentina Iusco	Romania	13.68	x	13.76				13.76	
10	Kristin Gierisch	Germany	x	13.62	13.74				13.74	
11	Anna Krasutska	Ukraine	13.20	13.47	13.71				13.71	
12	Olha Korsun	Ukraine	x	x	13.69				13.69	
