= 2015 European Athletics U23 Championships – Women's long jump =

The women's long jump event at the 2015 European Athletics U23 Championships was held in Tallinn, Estonia, at Kadriorg Stadium on 11 and 12 July.

== Medalists ==
Gold	Malaika Mihambo; Germany
Silver	Jazmin Sawyers; United Kingdom
Bronze	Alina Rotaru; Romania

== Results ==
=== Final ===
12 July

Rank	Name	Nationality	Attempts						Result	Notes
Rank	Name	Nationality	1	2	3	4	5	6	Result	Notes
1st place, gold medalist(s)	Malaika Mihambo	Germany	6.73 (w: +1.6 m/s)	x (w: +1.9 m/s)	6.14 (w: 0.0 m/s)	x (w: +1.1 m/s)	6.58 (w: +0.4 m/s)	x (w: +0.5 m/s)	6.73 (w: 1.6 m/s)	
2nd place, silver medalist(s)	Jazmin Sawyers	United Kingdom	6.17 (w: -0.6 m/s)	x (w: +0.8 m/s)	6.49 (w: +0.3 m/s)	6.28 (w: -0.8 m/s)	6.71 (w: +0.6 m/s)	x (w: -0.4 m/s)	6.71 (w: 0.6 m/s)	PB
3rd place, bronze medalist(s)	Alina Rotaru	Romania	6.42 (w: -0.5 m/s)	6.69 (w: +0.1 m/s)	x (w: +0.2 m/s)	x (w: -0.1 m/s)	6.55 (w: -0.4 m/s)	6.64 (w: -0.4 m/s)	6.69 (w: 0.1 m/s)	
4	Khaddi Sagnia	Sweden	6.47 (w: +1.0 m/s)	6.42 (w: +1.3 m/s)	6.55 (w: +0.4 m/s)	6.43 (w: -0.2 m/s)	x (w: +0.7 m/s)	6.64 (w: +0.2 m/s)	6.64 (w: 0.2 m/s)	
5	Lena Malkus	Germany	6.64 (w: -0.4 m/s)	x (w: +0.1 m/s)	x (w: +0.3 m/s)	x (w: +0.5 m/s)	5.83 (w: +0.2 m/s)	x (w: +0.2 m/s)	6.64 (w: -0.4 m/s)	
6	Maryna Bekh	Ukraine	x (w: -1.3 m/s)	x (w: +0.3 m/s)	6.43 (w: -0.2 m/s)	x (w: -0.4 m/s)	x (w: +0.3 m/s)	6.50 (w: 0.0 m/s)	6.50 (w: 0.0 m/s)	
7	Martha Traoré	Denmark	6.10 (w: -0.7 m/s)	6.45 (w: +1.5 m/s)	x (w: -0.3 m/s)	x (w: -1.1 m/s)	6.01 (w: +0.3 m/s)	6.29 (w: -1.0 m/s)	6.45 (w: 1.5 m/s)	NUR PB
8	Nadia Akpana Assa	Norway	6.27 (w: +0.9 m/s)	6.27 (w: -0.1 m/s)	6.42 (w: -0.3 m/s)	x (w: -0.7 m/s)	6.34 (w: +0.9 m/s)	x (w: -0.3 m/s)	6.42 (w: -0.3 m/s)	
9	Annika Gärtz	Germany	6.41 (w: +0.2 m/s)	x (w: +0.3 m/s)	x (w: -0.3 m/s)				6.41 (w: 0.2 m/s)	
10	Tatyana Akmukhamedova	Russia	6.24 (w: +0.7 m/s)	6.12 (w: -0.2 m/s)	6.38 (w: +1.8 m/s)				6.38 (w: 1.8 m/s)	
11	Nadine Visser	Netherlands	4.92 (w: +0.8 m/s)	6.16 (w: -0.7 m/s)	x (w: +0.5 m/s)				6.16 (w: -0.7 m/s)	
12	Jogaile Petrokaitė	Lithuania	x (w: +1.4 m/s)	x (w: +0.5 m/s)	6.03 (w: +0.7 m/s)				6.03 (w: 0.7 m/s)	

=== Qualifications ===
11 July

Rank	Name	Nationality	Attempts			Result	Notes
Rank	Name	Nationality	1	2	3	Result	Notes
1	Malaika Mihambo	Germany	6.75 (w: -0.6 m/s)			6.75 (w: -0.6 m/s)	Q
2	Alina Rotaru	Romania	6.39 (w: -1.0 m/s)	6.73 (w: +1.4 m/s)		6.73 (w: 1.4 m/s)	SB Q
3	Maryna Bekh	Ukraine	6.62 w (w: +2.2 m/s)			6.62 w (w: 2.2 m/s)	Q
4	Khaddi Sagnia	Sweden	6.33 (w: -0.2 m/s)	6.52 (w: +1.4 m/s)		6.52 (w: 1.4 m/s)	Q
5	Nadia Akpana Assa	Norway	6.14 (w: -0.3 m/s)	6.48 (w: +1.0 m/s)		6.48 (w: 1.0 m/s)	NUR PB q
6	Annika Gärtz	Germany	x (w: +1.0 m/s)	x (w: -0.6 m/s)	6.45 (w: +1.0 m/s)	6.45 (w: 1.0 m/s)	PB q
7	Jazmin Sawyers	United Kingdom	6.20 (w: +1.4 m/s)	6.43 (w: -0.8 m/s)		6.43 (w: -0.8 m/s)	q
8	Martha Traoré	Denmark	6.11 (w: +2.6 m/s)	5.85 (w: +1.7 m/s)	6.29 (w: +1.2 m/s)	6.29 (w: 1.2 m/s)	q
9	Tatyana Akmukhamedova	Russia	5.99 (w: +0.2 m/s)	6.27 (w: -0.7 m/s)	x (w: -0.3 m/s)	6.27 (w: -0.7 m/s)	q
10	Nadine Visser	Netherlands	5.97 (w: +0.5 m/s)	6.26 (w: +1.5 m/s)		6.26 (w: 1.5 m/s)	q
11	Lena Malkus	Germany	x (w: -0.3 m/s)	6.21 (w: -1.4 m/s)	6.22 (w: -0.1 m/s)	6.22 (w: -0.1 m/s)	q
12	Jogaile Petrokaitė	Lithuania	6.18 (w: +0.7 m/s)	x (w: +1.1 m/s)	6.19 (w: +1.1 m/s)	6.19 (w: 1.1 m/s)	SB q
13	Yelena Mashinistova	Russia	6.10 (w: +0.9 m/s)	6.11 (w: +1.1 m/s)	6.12 (w: +0.1 m/s)	6.12 (w: 0.1 m/s)	
14	Teresa Carvalho	Portugal	5.99 (w: +1.2 m/s)	x (w: +1.9 m/s)	6.10 (w: +2.9 m/s)	6.10 w (w: 2.9 m/s)	
15	Sarah McCarthy	Ireland	5.45 (w: -0.4 m/s)	x (w: +2.0 m/s)	6.10 (w: +1.4 m/s)	6.10 (w: 1.4 m/s)	
16	Kaia Soosaar	Estonia	6.06 (w: 0.0 m/s)	x (w: +2.4 m/s)	x (w: +1.2 m/s)	6.06 (w: 0.0 m/s)	
17	Ottavia Cestonaro	Italy	6.02 (w: +0.4 m/s)	x (w: +2.6 m/s)	6.04 (w: +1.0 m/s)	6.04 (w: 1.0 m/s)	
18	Fatim Affessi	Switzerland	6.01 (w: +0.9 m/s)	x (w: +0.8 m/s)	6.04 (w: +1.0 m/s)	6.04 (w: 1.0 m/s)	
19	Elena Andreea Panțuroiu	Romania	5.80 (w: +0.6 m/s)	6.04 (w: +1.0 m/s)	x (w: 0.0 m/s)	6.04 (w: 1.0 m/s)	
20	Dariya Derkach	Italy	6.00 (w: +1.0 m/s)	6.00 (w: +1.0 m/s)	5.85 (w: -0.5 m/s)	6.00 (w: 1.0 m/s)	
21	Ilona Kyrychenko	Ukraine	6.00 w (w: +2.4 m/s)	x (w: +2.3 m/s)	5.92 (w: 0.0 m/s)	6.00 w (w: 2.4 m/s)	
22	Satenik Hovhannisyan	Armenia	5.92 (w: -0.7 m/s)	6.00 w (w: +3.5 m/s)	5.96 (w: +0.5 m/s)	6.00 w (w: 3.5 m/s)	
23	Anne-Mari Lehtiö	Finland	x (w: -0.4 m/s)	x (w: +1.0 m/s)	5.99 (w: +1.9 m/s)	5.99 (w: 1.9 m/s)	
24	Giulia Liboà	Italy	5.94 (w: -0.3 m/s)	x (w: +1.5 m/s)	x (w: +0.6 m/s)	5.94 (w: -0.3 m/s)	
25	Réka Czuth	Hungary	x (w: +1.7 m/s)	5.63 (w: +2.5 m/s)	5.79 (w: +0.8 m/s)	5.79 (w: 0.8 m/s)	
26	Tähti Alver	Estonia	5.68 (w: -0.2 m/s)	x (w: +2.3 m/s)	4.52 (w: +0.6 m/s)	5.68 (w: -0.2 m/s)	
27	Ariadna Ramos	Spain	5.64 (w: +0.6 m/s)	5.61 (w: -0.2 m/s)	5.63 (w: 0.0 m/s)	5.64 (w: 0.6 m/s)	
28	Teresa Errandonea	Spain	x (w: +1.9 m/s)	5.19 (w: -0.2 m/s)	x (w: +1.5 m/s)	5.19 (w: -0.2 m/s)	
	Paola Borović	Croatia	x (w: -0.3 m/s)	x (w: -0.3 m/s)	x (w: +1.3 m/s)	NM	

== Participation ==
According to an unofficial count, 29 athletes from 20 countries participated in the event.

- Armenia (1)
- Croatia (1)
- Denmark (1)
- Estonia (2)
- Finland (1)
- Germany (3)
- Hungary (1)
- Ireland (1)
- Italy (3)
- Lithuania (1)
- Netherlands (1)
- Norway (1)
- Portugal (1)
- Romania (2)
- Russia (2)
- Spain (2)
- Sweden (1)
- Switzerland (1)
- Ukraine (2)
- United Kingdom (1)
