= 2011 World Youth Championships in Athletics – Girls' long jump =

Girls' long jump at the 2011 World Youth Championships in Athletics
- Venue: Stadium Lille Métropole
- Dates: 9 July (qualification); 10 July (final)
- Competitors: 29
- Winning distance: 6.22

Medalists
gold medal	Chanice Porter	Jamaica
silver medal	Anastassia Angioi	Italy
bronze medal	Marina Buchelnikova	Russia

The girls' long jump at the 2011 World Youth Championships in Athletics was held at the Stadium Lille Métropole on 9 and 10 July.

== Medalists ==
Gold	Silver	Bronze
Chanice Porter; Jamaica	Anastassia Angioi; Italy	Marina Buchelnikova; Russia

== Records ==
Prior to the competition, the following records were as follows.

World Youth Best	Heike Drechsler (GDR)	6.91	Jena, East Germany	9 August 1981
Championship Record	Darya Klishina (RUS)	6.47	Ostrava, Czech Republic	15 July 2007
World Youth Leading	Maryna Bekh (UKR)	6.47	Donetsk, Ukraine	16 June 2011

== Qualification ==
Qualification rule: qualification standard 6.00 m or at least best 12 qualified.

=== Group A ===
Rank	Name	Nationality	#1	#2	#3	Result	Notes
1	Akela Jones	Barbados	5.52	6.10		6.10	Q
2	Malaika Mihambo	Germany	6.04			6.04	Q
3	Paula Álvarez	Cuba	x	5.93	5.87	5.93	q
4	Chanice Porter	Jamaica	5.15	5.81	5.92	5.92	q
5	Ottavia Cestonaro	Italy	x	5.87	x	5.87	q
6	Antonija Radić	Croatia	5.82	5.75	5.85	5.85	q
7	Jogailė Petrokaitė	Lithuania	5.80	5.77	5.78	5.80	
8	Fu Luna	China	5.10	5.29	5.77	5.77	
9	Ana Martín-Sacristán	Spain	5.74	x	4.26	5.74	
10	Aimée Adamis	France	5.73	x	5.68	5.73	
11	Janet Seeliger	South Africa	5.59	5.72	5.60	5.72	
12	Ionela Pistol	Romania	5.60	5.57	5.66	5.66	
13	Aet Laurik	Estonia	5.52	x	5.34	5.52	
14	Bohdana Melnyk	Ukraine	5.30	x	5.39	5.39	

=== Group B ===
Rank	Name	Nationality	#1	#2	#3	Result	Notes
1	Maryse Luzolo	Germany	6.10			6.10	Q
2	Marina Buchelnikova	Russia	5.94	6.07		6.07	Q
3	Anastassia Angioi	Italy	5.72	5.97	–	5.97	q
4	Khaddi Sagnia	Sweden	5.91	3.79	5.90	5.91	q, SB
5	Maryna Bekh	Ukraine	x	5.90	5.74	5.90	q
6	Daniellys Dutil	Cuba	5.73	5.89	x	5.89	q
7	Maryke Brits	South Africa	5.26	5.81	5.53	5.81	
8	Satenik Hovhannisyan	Armenia	5.58	5.76	5.66	5.76	
9	Awa Sene	France	x	5.62	5.75	5.75	
10	Vasiliki Koutsoubou	Greece	5.36	5.60	5.54	5.60	
11	Dilyara Abuova	Kazakhstan	5.52	x	5.55	5.55	
12	Jhoanmy Luque	Venezuela	5.28	5.35	5.55	5.55	
13	Christel El-Saneh	Lebanon	x	4.95	5.09	5.09	
	Paola Borović	Croatia	x	x	x	NM	
	Andressa Fidelis	Brazil				DNS	

== Final ==
Rank	Name	Nationality	#1	#2	#3	#4	#5	#6	Result	Notes
1st place, gold medalist(s)	Chanice Porter	Jamaica	5.90	6.03	x	x	5.89	6.22	6.22	
2nd place, silver medalist(s)	Anastassia Angioi	Italy	5.90	6.17	5.76	5.09	5.69	x	6.17	
3rd place, bronze medalist(s)	Marina Buchelnikova	Russia	6.06	5.90	5.82	6.06	6.11	5.99	6.11	
4	Maryse Luzolo	Germany	x	5.74	5.95	6.06	5.88	x	6.06	
5	Maryna Bekh	Ukraine	6.05	5.97	x	5.74	6.02	5.63	6.05	
6	Akela Jones	Barbados	5.75	5.90	6.04	x	–	–	6.04	
7	Ottavia Cestonaro	Italy	5.65	x	5.89	x	5.93	4.42	5.93	
8	Antonija Radić	Croatia	5.60	5.58	5.91	5.60	x	x	5.91	
9	Malaika Mihambo	Germany	5.35	5.81	5.69				5.81	
10	Paula Álvarez	Cuba	5.79	x	5.52				5.79	
11	Khaddi Sagnia	Sweden	x	x	5.75				5.75	
12	Daniellys Dutil	Cuba	x	5.59	5.69				5.69	
