= 2015 European Athletics U23 Championships – Women's triple jump =

The women's triple jump event at the 2015 European Athletics U23 Championships was held in Tallinn, Estonia, at Kadriorg Stadium on 9 and 10 July.

== Medalists ==
Gold	Dovilė Dzindzaletaitė; Lithuania
Silver	Elena Andreea Panțuroiu; Romania
Bronze	Tetyana Ptashkina; Ukraine

== Results ==
=== Final ===
10 July

Rank	Name	Nationality	Attempts						Result	Notes
Rank	Name	Nationality	1	2	3	4	5	6	Result	Notes
1st place, gold medalist(s)	Dovilė Dzindzaletaitė	Lithuania	13.94 (w: +2.4 m/s)	14.23 (w: +2.1 m/s)	x (w: +1.5 m/s)	14.23 (w: +1.9 m/s)	x (w: +0.6 m/s)	x (w: +0.5 m/s)	14.23 (w: 1.9 m/s)	NR NUR PB
2nd place, silver medalist(s)	Elena Andreea Panțuroiu	Romania	13.80 (w: +1.7 m/s)	14.13 (w: +1.8 m/s)	13.51 (w: 0.0 m/s)	x (w: +0.7 m/s)	13.66 (w: +1.5 m/s)	x (w: +2.0 m/s)	14.13 (w: 1.8 m/s)	PB
3rd place, bronze medalist(s)	Tetyana Ptashkina	Ukraine	x (w: +0.8 m/s)	14.05 (w: +1.0 m/s)	x (w: +1.3 m/s)	13.77 (w: -0.5 m/s)	13.97 (w: -0.6 m/s)	13.99 (w: +0.3 m/s)	14.05 (w: 1.0 m/s)	
4	Dariya Derkach	Italy	x (w: +0.1 m/s)	13.33 (w: +1.0 m/s)	13.88 (w: +2.6 m/s)	x (w: +1.4 m/s)	13.32 (w: +2.8 m/s)	x (w: +1.0 m/s)	13.88 w (w: 2.6 m/s)	
5	Rouguy Diallo	France	13.62 (w: +2.7 m/s)	13.68 (w: +1.8 m/s)	13.53 (w: +0.7 m/s)	x (w: +0.5 m/s)	13.77 (w: +2.0 m/s)	13.51 (w: -0.3 m/s)	13.77 (w: 2.0 m/s)	
6	Darya Nidbaykina	Russia	13.59 (w: +1.1 m/s)	13.52 (w: +1.2 m/s)	x (w: +3.3 m/s)	12.60 (w: +2.0 m/s)	12.74 (w: +1.4 m/s)	12.55 (w: -1.4 m/s)	13.59 (w: 1.1 m/s)	
7	Ottavia Cestonaro	Italy	13.34 (w: +1.7 m/s)	13.22 (w: +1.0 m/s)	13.11 (w: +0.8 m/s)	13.09 (w: +1.3 m/s)	13.13 (w: -0.2 m/s)	x (w: +2.5 m/s)	13.34 (w: 1.7 m/s)	SB
8	Silvia La Tella	Italy	13.34 (w: +0.3 m/s)	13.14 (w: +2.0 m/s)	12.75 (w: +0.2 m/s)	x (w: +1.1 m/s)	12.87 (w: +0.9 m/s)	x (w: +0.5 m/s)	13.34 (w: 0.3 m/s)	PB
9	Paola Borović	Croatia	x (w: +0.9 m/s)	13.21 (w: +0.5 m/s)	13.08 (w: +1.2 m/s)				13.21 (w: 0.5 m/s)	NUR PB
10	Hanna Krasutska	Ukraine	12.89 (w: +0.3 m/s)	12.90 (w: +0.4 m/s)	13.13 (w: +1.4 m/s)				13.13 (w: 1.4 m/s)	
11	Yekaterina Sariyeva	Azerbaijan	12.90 (w: -0.2 m/s)	x (w: +1.5 m/s)	x (w: +2.2 m/s)				12.90 (w: -0.2 m/s)	
12	Ariadna Ramos	Spain	12.46 (w: +0.5 m/s)	x (w: +1.2 m/s)	x (w: -0.2 m/s)				12.46 (w: 0.5 m/s)	

=== Qualifications ===
9 July

Rank	Name	Nationality	Attempts			Result	Notes
Rank	Name	Nationality	1	2	3	Result	Notes
1	Tetyana Ptashkina	Ukraine	14.08 (w: +1.1 m/s)			14.08 (w: 1.1 m/s)	PB Q
2	Elena Andreea Panțuroiu	Romania	13.72 w (w: +2.1 m/s)			13.72 w (w: 2.1 m/s)	Q
3	Dovilė Dzindzaletaitė	Lithuania	13.63 (w: +0.3 m/s)			13.63 (w: 0.3 m/s)	Q
4	Dariya Derkach	Italy	13.29 (w: +0.5 m/s)	13.38 (w: +1.4 m/s)		13.38 (w: 1.4 m/s)	q
5	Rouguy Diallo	France	13.30 (w: +0.1 m/s)	13.33 (w: +1.8 m/s)		13.33 (w: 1.8 m/s)	q
6	Ottavia Cestonaro	Italy	13.18 (w: +1.8 m/s)	12.74 (w: +0.3 m/s)		13.18 (w: 1.8 m/s)	q
7	Darya Nidbaykina	Russia	x (w: +0.7 m/s)	13.13 w (w: +2.4 m/s)	x (w: +1.7 m/s)	13.13 w (w: 2.4 m/s)	q
8	Ariadna Ramos	Spain	13.00 (w: +1.3 m/s)	12.93 (w: +1.8 m/s)	13.02 (w: +0.6 m/s)	13.02 (w: 0.6 m/s)	q
9	Hanna Krasutska	Ukraine	12.81 (w: +0.7 m/s)	13.01 (w: +1.6 m/s)	12.66 (w: +0.8 m/s)	13.01 (w: 1.6 m/s)	q
10	Paola Borović	Croatia	12.82 (w: +0.8 m/s)	12.95 (w: +0.5 m/s)	12.98 (w: -1.1 m/s)	12.98 (w: -1.1 m/s)	q
11	Silvia La Tella	Italy	12.62 (w: +1.0 m/s)	12.87 (w: +2.4 m/s)	12.96 (w: +0.9 m/s)	12.96 (w: 0.9 m/s)	q
12	Yekaterina Sariyeva	Azerbaijan	12.50 (w: +2.7 m/s)	12.19 (w: +2.0 m/s)	12.87 (w: +0.1 m/s)	12.87 (w: 0.1 m/s)	q
13	Andreea Simona Lefcenco	Romania	x (w: 0.0 m/s)	12.85 (w: +0.2 m/s)	12.72 (w: +1.3 m/s)	12.85 (w: 0.2 m/s)	
14	Tähti Alver	Estonia	x (w: +1.0 m/s)	12.48 (w: +1.1 m/s)	12.81 (w: +0.2 m/s)	12.81 (w: 0.2 m/s)	PB
15	Nastassia Leonava	Belarus	12.10 (w: +0.6 m/s)	12.74 (w: -1.5 m/s)	x (w: +1.4 m/s)	12.74 (w: -1.5 m/s)	
16	Beyza Tilki	Turkey	12.53 (w: +1.4 m/s)	12.40 (w: 0.0 m/s)	12.57 (w: +1.4 m/s)	12.57 (w: 1.4 m/s)	
17	Janne Nielsen	Denmark	x (w: +0.4 m/s)	12.49 (w: +1.6 m/s)	12.34 (w: +1.8 m/s)	12.49 (w: 1.6 m/s)	

== Participation ==
According to an unofficial count, 17 athletes from 13 countries participated in the event.

- Azerbaijan (1)
- Belarus (1)
- Croatia (1)
- Denmark (1)
- Estonia (1)
- France (1)
- Italy (3)
- Lithuania (1)
- Romania (2)
- Russia (1)
- Spain (1)
- Turkey (1)
- Ukraine (2)
