= 2023 European Athletics Indoor Championships – Women's triple jump =

Women's triple jump at the 2023 European Athletics Indoor Championships
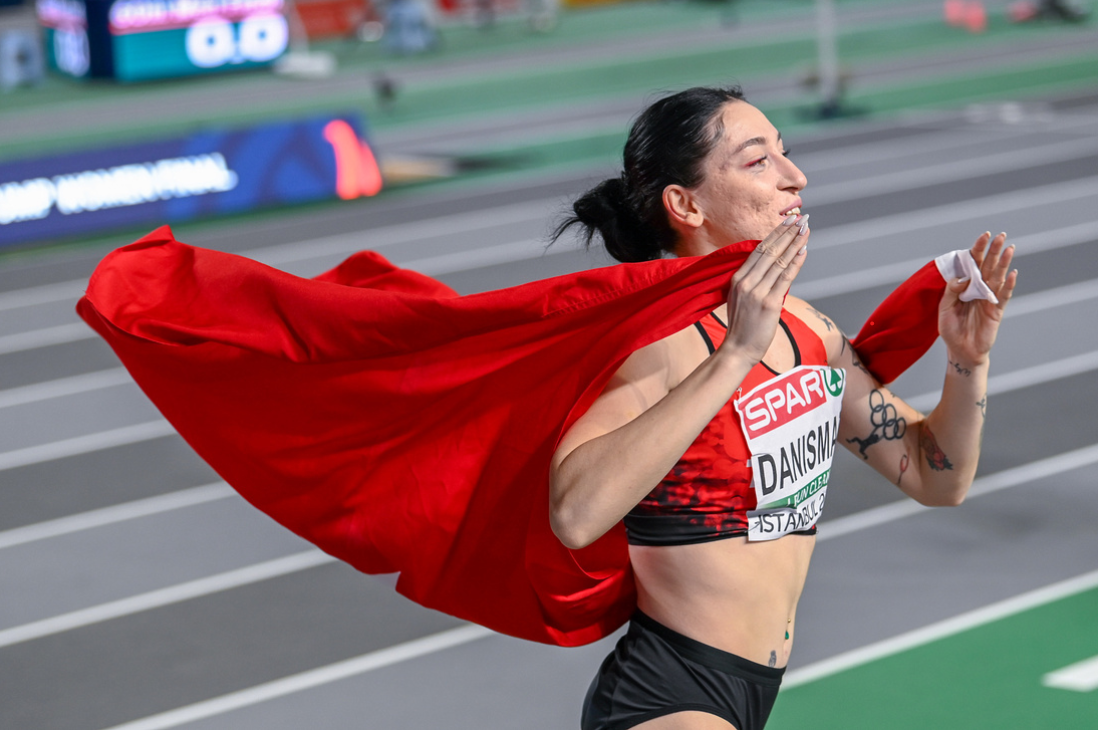
- Tuğba Danışmaz was the winner of the event.
- Venue: Ataköy Athletics Arena
- Location: Istanbul, Turkey
- Dates: 3 March 2023 (qualification); 4 March 2023 (final)
- Competitors: 18 from 14 nations
- Winning mark: 14.31 m =NR

Medalists
gold medal	Tuğba Danışmaz	Turkey
silver medal	Dariya Derkach	Italy
bronze medal	Patrícia Mamona	Portugal

The women's triple jump event at the 2023 European Athletics Indoor Championships was held on 3 March at 11:10 (qualification) and 4 March at 19:50 (final) local time.

== Records ==
Standing records prior to the 2023 European Athletics Indoor Championships
World record	Yulimar Rojas (VEN)	15.74	Belgrade, Serbia	20 March 2022
European record	Tatyana Lebedeva (RUS)	15.36	Budapest, Hungary	6 March 2004
Championship record	Ashia Hansen (GBR)	15.16	Valencia, Spain	28 February 1998
World Leading	Liadagmis Povea (CUB)	14.81	Liévin, France	15 February 2023
European Leading	Maryna Bekh-Romanchuk (UKR)	14.41	Karlsruhe, Germany	27 January 2023

== Results ==
=== Qualification ===
Qualification: Qualifying performance 14.10 (Q) or at least 8 best performers (q) advance to the Final.

Rank	Athlete	Nationality	#1	#2	#3	Result	Note
1	Tuğba Danışmaz	Turkey	13.81	14.09		14.09	q
2	Patrícia Mamona	Portugal	14.09	x		14.09	q
3	Dariya Derkach	Italy	13.81	13.98		13.98	q
4	Ottavia Cestonaro	Italy	13.98			13.98	q
5	Kira Wittmann	Germany	13.57	13.96		13.96	q
6	Neja Filipič	Slovenia	x	13.94	13.18	13.94	q, SB
7	Dovilė Kilty	Lithuania	13.28	13.48	13.83	13.83	q, SB
8	Maja Åskag	Sweden	x	13.67	13.82	13.82	q, =SB
9	Adrianna Laskowska	Poland	x	13.66	13.76	13.76	=SB
10	Spyridoula Karydi	Greece	13.60	x	x	13.60	SB
11	Yekaterina Sariyeva	Azerbaijan	x	13.55	13.40	13.55	NR
12	Aina Grikšaitė	Lithuania	13.38	13.48	13.50	13.50	
13	Elena Andreea Taloș	Romania	13.31	13.39	13.28	13.39	
14	Diana Zagainova	Lithuania	x	13.30	13.37	13.37	
15	Eva Pepelnak	Slovenia	13.32	13.28	x	13.32	
16	Aleksandra Nacheva	Bulgaria	13.26	13.12	13.09	13.26	
17	Paola Borović	Croatia	13.03	x	13.24	13.24	
18	Yana Sargsyan	Armenia	12.76	12.84	x	12.84	SB

=== Final ===
Rank	Athlete	Nationality	#1	#2	#3	#4	#5	#6	Result	Note
1st place, gold medalist(s)	Tuğba Danışmaz	Turkey	14.31	14.11	x	x	x	x	14.31	NR
2nd place, silver medalist(s)	Dariya Derkach	Italy	13.97	14.20	13.54	14.08	x	11.87	14.20	
3rd place, bronze medalist(s)	Patrícia Mamona	Portugal	14.16	13.98	x	x	13.90	13.41	14.16	
4	Ottavia Cestonaro	Italy	13.98	13.88	x	x	14.03	14.08	14.08	
5	Neja Filipič	Slovenia	13.92	x	13.54	x	x	13.05	13.92	
6	Dovilė Kilty	Lithuania	x	13.92	13.52	x	x	13.36	13.92	SB
7	Kira Wittmann	Germany	11.92	13.73	13.79	13.74	13.64	13.66	13.79	
8	Maja Åskag	Sweden	x	x	x	x	13.39	13.64	13.64	
