= 2025 World Athletics Championships – Women's triple jump =

Women's triple jump at the 2025 World Athletics Championships
- Venue: National Stadium
- Location: Tokyo, Japan
- Dates: 16 September (qualification); 18 September (final)
- Winning distance: 14.94 WL

Medalists
gold medal	Leyanis Pérez	Cuba
silver medal	Thea LaFond	Dominica
bronze medal	Yulimar Rojas	Venezuela

The women's triple jump at the 2025 World Athletics Championships was held at the National Stadium in Tokyo on 16 and 18 September 2025.

== Records ==
Before the competition records were as follows:

Record	Athlete & Nat.	Perf.	Location	Date
World record	Yulimar Rojas (VEN)	15.74 m (i)	Belgrade, Serbia	20 March 2022
Championship record	Inessa Kravets (UKR)	15.50 m	Gothenburg, Sweden	10 August 1995
World Leading	Leyanis Pérez (CUB)	14.93 m (i)	Nanjing, China	22 March 2025
African Record	Françoise Mbango Etone (CMR)	15.39 m	Beijing, China	17 August 2008
Asian Record	Olga Rypakova (KAZ)	15.25 m	Split, Croatia	26 October 2009
European Record	Inessa Kravets (UKR)	15.50 m	Gothenburg, Sweden	10 August 1995
North, Central American and Caribbean record	Yamilé Aldama (CUB)	15.29 m	Rome, Italy	11 July 2003
Oceanian record	Nicole Mladenis (AUS)	14.04 m	Hobart, Australia	9 March 2002
Oceanian record	Nicole Mladenis (AUS)	14.04 m	Perth, Australia	7 December 2003
South American Record	Yulimar Rojas (VEN)	15.74 m (i)	Belgrade, Serbia	20 March 2022

== Qualification standard ==
The standard to qualify automatically for entry was 14.55 m.

== Schedule ==
The event schedule, in local time (UTC+9), was as follows:

Date	Time	Round
13 September	19:40	Qualification
14 September	20:55	Final

== Results ==
=== Qualification ===
All athletes over 14.35 m ( Q ) or at least the 12 best performers ( q ) advanced to the final.

==== Group A ====
Place	Athlete	Nation	Round			Mark	Notes
Place	Athlete	Nation	#1	#2	#3	Mark	Notes
1	Leyanis Pérez	Cuba	14.66 (+0.4 m/s)			14.66 m (+0.4 m/s)	Q
2	Thea LaFond	Dominica	14.40 (+0.6 m/s)			14.40 m (+0.6 m/s)	Q
3	Shanieka Ricketts	Jamaica	x	14.30 (+0.7 m/s)	14.28 (+0.7 m/s)	14.30 m (+0.7 m/s)	q
4	Neja Filipič	Slovenia	13.64 (+0.5 m/s)	13.91 (+1.2 m/s)	14.05 (+0.7 m/s)	14.05 m (+0.7 m/s)	q
5	Tuğba Danışmaz	Turkey	x	13.86 (+0.8 m/s)	14.00 (+0.7 m/s)	14.00 m (+0.7 m/s)	q
6	Dovilė Kilty	Lithuania	13.84 (+1.1 m/s)	13.86 (+0.8 m/s)	x	13.86 m (+0.8 m/s)	
7	Elena Andreea Taloș	Romania	13.85 (+0.6 m/s)	13.51 (+0.5 m/s)	13.82 (+0.7 m/s)	13.85 m (+0.6 m/s)	
8	Ivana Španović	Serbia	13.82 (+0.7 m/s)	x	13.66 (+0.2 m/s)	13.82 m (+0.7 m/s)	
9	Sharifa Davronova	Uzbekistan	x	13.65 (+0.6 m/s)	13.79 (+0.3 m/s)	13.79 m (+0.7 m/s)	
10	Ilona Masson	Belgium	13.79 (+0.7 m/s)	x	13.34 (+0.7 m/s)	13.79 m (+0.7 m/s)	
11	Senni Salminen	Finland	x	13.77 (+0.6 m/s)	x	13.77 m (+0.6 m/s)	
12	Dariya Derkach	Italy	x	x	13.69 (+0.6 m/s)	13.69 m (+0.6 m/s)	SB
13	Maoko Takashima	Japan	13.08 (+0.7 m/s)	13.39 (+0.7 m/s)	13.66 (−0.3 m/s)	13.66 m (−0.3 m/s)	
14	Gabriele dos Santos	Brazil	13.51 (+1.3 m/s)	13.54 (+0.7 m/s)	13.27 (+1.3 m/s)	13.54 m (+0.7 m/s)	
15	Jessie Maduka	Germany	13.37 (+0.7 m/s)	13.47 (+0.9 m/s)	13.12 (+0.7 m/s)	13.47 m (+0.9 m/s)	
16	Olha Korsun	Ukraine	x	13.40 (+0.7 m/s)	x	13.40 m (+0.7 m/s)	
17	Ilionis Guillaume	France	x	x	13.38 (+0.8 m/s)	13.38 m (+0.8 m/s)	
18	Agur Dwol	United States	x	12.96 (+0.6 m/s)	13.30 (+1.2 m/s)	13.30 m (+1.2 m/s)	

==== Group B ====
Place	Athlete	Nation	Round			Mark	Notes
Place	Athlete	Nation	#1	#2	#3	Mark	Notes
1	Yulimar Rojas	Venezuela	14.49 (+0.3 m/s)			14.49 m (+0.3 m/s)	Q, SB
2	Liadagmis Povea	Cuba	14.44 (+0.6 m/s)			14.44 m (+0.6 m/s)	Q
3	Jasmine Moore	United States	x	14.22 (+0.6 m/s)	14.12 (+0.5 m/s)	14.22 m (+0.6 m/s)	q
4	Saly Sarr	Senegal	14.19 (+0.3 m/s)	14.21 (+0.4 m/s)	14.01 (−0.1 m/s)	14.21 m (+0.4 m/s)	q
5	Ackelia Smith	Jamaica	14.21 (+0.2 m/s)	14.14 (+1.0 m/s)	14.09 (+0.3 m/s)	14.21 m (+0.2 m/s)	q
6	Caroline Joyeux	Germany	13.99 (+0.2 m/s)	13.82 (+0.8 m/s)	14.19 (+0.7 m/s)	14.19 m (+0.7 m/s)	q
7	Maja Åskag	Sweden	13.96 (+0.1 m/s)	14.15 (+0.6 m/s)	14.14 (+0.4 m/s)	14.15 m (+0.6 m/s)	q
8	Gabriela Petrova	Bulgaria	x	13.72 (+0.1 m/s)	13.86 (±0.0 m/s)	13.86 m (±0.0 m/s)	
9	Erika Saraceni	Italy	13.82 (+1.0 m/s)	x	x	13.82 m (+1.0 m/s)	
10	Linda Suchá	Czech Republic	13.72 (+0.8 m/s)	x	13.34 (−0.1 m/s)	13.72 m (+0.7 m/s)	
11	Li Yi	China	13.57 (+0.4 m/s)	13.21 (+0.5 m/s)	13.68 (+0.8 m/s)	13.68 m (+0.8 m/s)	
12	Oxana Koreneva	Greece	13.50 (+0.3 m/s)	13.66 (+0.6 m/s)	13.61	13.66 m (+0.6 m/s)	
13	Diana Ana Maria Ion	Romania	13.64 (+0.3 m/s)	x	13.42 (±0.0 m/s)	13.64 m (+0.3 m/s)	
14	Desleigh Owusu	Australia	x	13.58 (+0.4 m/s)	x	13.58 m (+0.4 m/s)	
15	Janne Nielsen	Denmark	x	13.53 (+0.6 m/s)	x	13.53 m (+0.6 m/s)	
16	Anne-Suzanna Fosther-Katta	Cameroon	13.18 (+0.9 m/s)	13.45 (+0.2 m/s)	13.14 (+0.4 m/s)	13.45 m (+0.2 m/s)	
17	Mariko Morimoto	Japan	13.10 (+0.5 m/s)	x	13.02 (+0.7 m/s)	13.10 m (+0.5 m/s)	
	Regiclécia Cândido	Brazil	x	x	x	NM	

=== Final ===
Place	Athlete	Nation	Round						Mark	Notes
Place	Athlete	Nation	#1	#2	#3	#4	#5	#6	Mark	Notes
1st place, gold medalist(s)	Leyanis Pérez	Cuba	14.85 (−0.3 m/s)	x	14.90 (+0.3 m/s)	14.94 (−0.3 m/s)	x	14.94 (+0.4 m/s)	14.94 (+0.4 m/s)	WL
2nd place, silver medalist(s)	Thea LaFond	Dominica	14.52 (+1.1 m/s)	14.76 (+1.4 m/s)	14.40 (±0.0 m/s)	14.59 (−0.2 m/s)	x	14.89 (+1.0 m/s)	14.89 (+1.0 m/s)	SB
3rd place, bronze medalist(s)	Yulimar Rojas	Venezuela	14.76 (+0.3 m/s)	x	14.60 (−0.1 m/s)	14.46 (−0.4 m/s)	x	14.71 (+0.3 m/s)	14.76 (+0.3 m/s)	SB
4	Liadagmis Povea	Cuba	14.67 (+0.4 m/s)	14.62 (+0.4 m/s)	14.72 (+0.2 m/s)	14.66 (±0.0 m/s)	x	13.88 (+0.8 m/s)	14.72 (+0.2 m/s)	
5	Shanieka Ricketts	Jamaica	14.56 (−0.2 m/s)	x	x	x	14.43 (±0.0 m/s)	14.53 (+0.6 m/s)	14.56 (−0.2 m/s)	
6	Saly Sarr	Senegal	14.55 (−0.4 m/s)	x	x	14.42 (−0.3 m/s)	14.22 (−0.2 m/s)	14.27 (±0.0 m/s)	14.55 (−0.4 m/s)	PB
7	Jasmine Moore	United States	x	14.08 (+0.1 m/s)	14.51 (+1.2 m/s)	14.27 (+0.2 m/s)	14.40 (+0.3 m/s)		14.51 (+1.2 m/s)	
8	Ackelia Smith	Jamaica	14.31 (+0.1 m/s)	13.79 (−0.2 m/s)	13.71 (−0.7 m/s)	14.06 (−0.3 m/s)	14.37 (−0.1 m/s)		14.37 (−0.1 m/s)	
9	Neja Filipič	Slovenia	x	13.92 (+0.6 m/s)	14.03 (+0.1 m/s)	x			14.03 (+0.1 m/s)	
10	Caroline Joyeux	Germany	13.63 (+0.1 m/s)	13.72 (+0.3 m/s)	14.00 (+0.6 m/s)	13.62 (+0.6 m/s)			14.00 (+0.6 m/s)	
11	Maja Åskag	Sweden	13.77 (−0.4 m/s)	x	13.92 (−0.4 m/s)				13.92 (−0.4 m/s)	
12	Tuğba Danışmaz	Turkey	x	x	13.43 (+0.1 m/s)				13.43 (+0.1 m/s)	
