= 2026 European Athletics Championships – Women's triple jump =

Women's triple jump at the 2026 European Athletics Championships
- Venue: Alexander Stadium
- Location: Birmingham, United Kingdom
- Dates: 10 August 2026 (qualification); 13 August 2026 (final)
- Competitors: 30 (target)
- Winning distance: 14.60 m EL, PB

Medalists
| gold medal | Dariya Derkach | Italy |
| silver medal | Saliyya Guisse | Belgium |
| bronze medal | Aleksandra Nacheva | Bulgaria |

The women's triple jump at the 2026 European Athletics Championships took place over two rounds at the Alexander Stadium in Birmingham, United Kingdom, on 10 and 13 August 2026.

== Background ==
Records before the 2026 European Athletics Championships
| Record | Athlete (nation) | Distance | Location | Date |
|---|---|---|---|---|
| World record | Yulimar Rojas (VEN) | 15.74 m | Belgrade, Serbia | 20 March 2022 |
| European record | Inessa Kravets (UKR) | 15.50 m | Gothenburg, Sweden | 10 August 1995 |
| Championship record | Tatyana Lebedeva (RUS) | 15.15 m | Gothenburg, Sweden | 9 August 2006 |
| World leading | Thea LaFond (DMA) | 15.25 m | Zagreb, Croatia | 26 June 2026 |
| European leading | Diana Ana Maria Ion (ROU) | 14.56 m | Craiova, Romania | 4 July 2026 |

== Qualification ==
For the women's triple jump, the qualification period was from 27 July 2025 to 26 July 2026. Athletes qualified by achieving the entry standard of 14.20 m or better, by wildcard for the 2024 European Athletics Champion (not used since Ana Peleteiro-Compaoré will not participate), or by their position on the World Athletics Rankings for the event. The target number was 30 athletes.

Qualification standings per 31 July 2026
| QP | CP | Country | Athlete | PB | SB | Status | Details |
|---|---|---|---|---|---|---|---|
| 1 | 1 | Romania | Diana Ana Maria Ion | 14.56 | 14.56 | Qualified by Entry Standard | 14.56 - Stadionul de atletism "Nicolae Mărășescu", Craiova (ROU) - 04 JUL 2026 |
| 2 | 1 | Belgium | Ilona Masson | 14.52 | 14.52 | Qualified by Entry Standard | 14.52 - Stade de Vongy, Thonon-les-Bains (FRA) - 05 JUL 2026 |
| 3 | 1 | Italy | Dariya Derkach | 14.52 | 14.51 | Qualified by Entry Standard | 14.51 - Sports Park Mladost, Zagreb (CRO) - 26 JUN 2026 |
| 4 | 1 | Slovenia | Neja Filipič | 14.50 | 14.50 | Qualified by Entry Standard | 14.50 - Štadion Kladivar, Celje (SLO) - 10 JUN 2026 |
| 5 | 1 | Turkey | Tuğba Danışmaz | 14.57 | 14.03 | Qualified by Entry Standard | 14.42 - Atatürk Stadyumu, Izmir (TUR) - 02 SEP 2025 |
| 6 | 1 | Serbia | Ivana Španović | 14.41 | 14.41 | Qualified by Entry Standard | 14.41 - Atletska dvorana, Beograd (SRB) (i) - 28 JAN 2026 |
| 7 | 2 | Italy | Erika Giorgia Anoeta Saraceni | 14.41 | 14.41 | Qualified by Entry Standard | 14.41 - Stadio Luigi Ridolfi, Firenze (ITA) - 25 JUL 2026 |
| 8 | 1 | Bulgaria | Gabriela Petrova | 14.66 | 14.37 | Qualified by Entry Standard | 14.37 - Kennedyplatz, Essen (GER) - 21 JUN 2026 |
| 9 | 2 | Bulgaria | Aleksandra Nacheva | 14.35 | 14.35 | Qualified by Entry Standard | 14.35 - ENKA Atletizm Pisti, Istanbul (TUR) - 11 JUL 2026 |
| 10 | 2 | Romania | Elena Andreea Taloș | 14.47 | 14.33 | Qualified by Entry Standard | 14.33 - Stadionul de atletism "Nicolae Mărășescu", Craiova (ROU) - 25 JUL 2026 |
| 11 | 1 | Germany | Caroline Joyeux | 14.45 | 14.22 | Qualified by Entry Standard | 14.24 - Heinz-Steyer-Stadion, Dresden (GER) - 02 AUG 2025 |
| 12 | 1 | Sweden | Maja Åskag | 14.27 | 14.24 | Qualified by Entry Standard | 14.24 - Filothei Stadium, Athina (GRE) - 03 JUN 2026 |
| 13 | 1 | Azerbaijan | Yekaterina Sariyeva | 13.89 | 13.55 | Qualified by Universality Place | |
| 14 | 1 | France | Ilionis Guillaume | 14.59 | 14.14 | Qualified by World Rankings | 6th - 1195 points |
| 15 | 2 | Germany | Kira Wittmann | 14.14 | 14.14 | Qualified by World Rankings | 14th - 1161 points |
| 16 | 1 | Greece | Oxana Koreneva | 14.03 | 14.00 | Qualified by World Rankings | 15th - 1160 points |
| 17 | 1 | Czech Republic | Linda Suchá | 14.03 | 13.90 | Qualified by World Rankings | 17th - 1153 points |
| 18 | 1 | Lithuania | Dovilė Kilty | 14.28 | 13.85 | Qualified by World Rankings | 18th - 1153 points |
| 19 | 2 | Belgium | Saliyya Guisse | 13.97 | 13.97 | Qualified by World Rankings | 19th - 1147 points |
| 20 | 2 | Greece | Spyridoula Karydi | 14.19 | 14.09 | Qualified by World Rankings | 20th - 1142 points |
| 21 | 1 | Finland | Senni Salminen | 14.63 | 13.78 | Qualified by World Rankings | 22nd - 1134 points |
| 22 | 2 | Serbia | Aleksandrija Mitrović | 13.92 | 13.92 | Qualified by World Rankings | 23rd - 1134 points |
| 23 | 2 | Lithuania | Diana Zagainova | 14.43 | 13.90 | Qualified by World Rankings | 24th - 1128 points |
| 24 | 3 | Germany | Ruth Hildebrand | 13.92 | 13.92 | Qualified by World Rankings | 27th - 1125 points |
| 25 | 1 | Denmark | Janne Nielsen | 14.13 | 13.70 | Qualified by World Rankings | 28th - 1121 points |
| 26 | 2 | Sweden | Emilia Sjöstrand | 14.09 | 13.63 | Qualified by World Rankings | 31st - 1116 points |
| 27 | 1 | Croatia | Paola Borović | 13.66 | 13.66 | Qualified by World Rankings | 32nd - 1112 points |
| 28 | 1 | Moldova | Iuliana Dabija | 13.75 | 13.75 | Qualified by World Rankings | 38th - 1105 points |
| 29 | 2 | Turkey | Kadriye Dilek Durmuş | 13.59 | 13.59 | Qualified by World Rankings | 43rd - 1100 points |
| 30 | 2 | Croatia | Magdalena Perić | 13.70 | 13.70 | Qualified by World Rankings | 49th - 1094 points |
| reserve | 3 | Italy | Greta Brugnolo | 13.72 | 13.72 | Next best by World Rankings | 52nd - 1092 points |
| reserve | 3 | Sweden | Katharina Gråman | 13.88 | 13.88 | Next best by World Rankings | 64th - 1072 points |
| reserve | 3 | Bulgaria | Galina Nikolova | 13.42 | 13.42 | Next best by World Rankings | 69th - 1069 points |

| Bye to semi-finals | Reserve activated | Withdrawal / reserve unused |

== Schedule ==
| Date | Time | Round |
|---|---|---|
| 10 August 2026 | 19:54 | Qualification. |
| 13 August 2026 | 19:40 | Final |

All times are local times (UTC+1)

== Results ==
=== Qualification ===
The qualification round was held on 10 August 2026, at 19:54 in the evening. All athletes meeting the Qualification Standard (Q) of 14.15 m or at least 12 best performers (q) advanced to the final.

==== Group A ====
| Place | Athlete | Nation | Round | | | Result | Notes |
| Place | Athlete | Nation | #1 | #2 | #3 | Result | Notes |
|---|---|---|---|---|---|---|---|
| 1 | Erika Saraceni | Italy | 13.79 (+0.9 m/s) | 14.50 (+0.7 m/s) | | 14.50 m (+0.7 m/s) | Q, PB |
| 2 | Kira Wittmann | Germany | 13.74 (+1.3 m/s) | 14.26 (+0.9 m/s) | | 14.26 m (+0.9 m/s) | Q, PB |
| 3 | Maja Åskag | Sweden | 14.10 (+0.8 m/s) | x | 14.21 (+0.7 m/s) | 14.21 m (+0.7 m/s) | Q |
| 4 | Aleksandra Nacheva | Bulgaria | 14.13 (+1.6 m/s) | x | x | 14.13 m (+1.6 m/s) | q |
| 5 | Saliyya Guisse | Belgium | 14.07 (+0.9 m/s) | 14.07 (+1.2 m/s) | x | 14.07 m (+0.9 m/s) | q, PB |
| 6 | Neja Filipič | Slovenia | 13.84 (+1.3 m/s) | 14.05 (+1.1 m/s) | x | 14.05 m (+1.1 m/s) | q |
| 7 | Aleksandrija Mitrović | Serbia | 13.93 (+0.9 m/s) | 13.23 (+0.9 m/s) | 11.50 (+0.5 m/s) | 13.93 m (+0.9 m/s) | PB |
| 8 | Yekaterina Sariyeva | Azerbaijan | 13.73 (+0.3 m/s) | 13.91 (±0.0 m/s) | 13.76 (+0.7 m/s) | 13.91 m (±0.0 m/s) | NR |
| 9 | Ruth Hildebrand | Germany | 13.70 (+0.6 m/s) | 13.90 (+0.7 m/s) | 13.84 (+0.9 m/s) | 13.90 m (+0.7 m/s) | |
| 10 | Ilionis Guillaume | France | 13.67 (+0.8 m/s) | 13.38 (+0.6 m/s) | 13.20 (+1.2 m/s) | 13.67 m (+0.8 m/s) | |
| 11 | Dovilė Kilty | Lithuania | 13.55 (±0.0 m/s) | 13.56 (+1.7 m/s) | 13.38 (+1.0 m/s) | 13.56 m (+1.7 m/s) | |
| 12 | Magdalena Perić | Croatia | 12.83 (+1.1 m/s) | 13.44 (+2.7 m/s) | 13.14 (+0.4 m/s) | 13.44 m (+2.7 m/s) | |
| 13 | Janne Nielsen | Denmark | x | 13.23 (+1.9 m/s) | x | 13.23 m (+1.9 m/s) | |
| — | Kadriye Dilek Durmuş | Turkey | x | x | x | NM (+ m/s) | |
| — | Diana Ion | Romania | x | x | x | NM (+ m/s) | |

==== Group B ====
| Place | Athlete | Nation | Round | | | Result | Notes |
| Place | Athlete | Nation | #1 | #2 | #3 | Result | Notes |
|---|---|---|---|---|---|---|---|
| 1 | Dariya Derkach | Italy | 14.42 (+1.0 m/s) | | | 14.42 m (+1.0 m/s) | Q |
| 2 | Ilona Masson | Belgium | 14.35 (+1.7 m/s) | | | 14.35 m (+1.7 m/s) | Q |
| 3 | Tuğba Danışmaz | Turkey | x | 14.23 (+0.6 m/s) | | 14.23 m (+0.6 m/s) | Q, SB |
| 4 | Ivana Španović | Serbia | 14.21 (+1.2 m/s) | | | 14.21 m (+1.2 m/s) | Q |
| 5 | Gabriela Petrova | Bulgaria | 14.00 (+1.5 m/s) | 14.11 (+0.9 m/s) | − | 14.11 m (+0.9 m/s) | q |
| 6 | Elena Taloș | Romania | 13.94 (+1.3 m/s) | 14.03 (+1.0 m/s) | 13.58 (+0.9 m/s) | 14.03 m (+1.0 m/s) | q |
| 7 | Spyridoula Karydi | Greece | 14.03 (+1.6 m/s) | 13.54 (+0.8 m/s) | x | 14.03 m (+1.6 m/s) | |
| 8 | Caroline Joyeux | Germany | 13.98 (+1.9 m/s) | x | 13.25 (+1.1 m/s) | 13.98 m (+1.9 m/s) | |
| 9 | Linda Suchá | Czech Republic | 13.48 (+1.1 m/s) | 13.71 (+1.0 m/s) | 13.38 (+0.9 m/s) | 13.71 m (+1.0 m/s) | |
| 10 | Senni Salminen | Finland | 13.28 (+1.0 m/s) | 13.53 (+1.2 m/s) | 13.44 (+0.8 m/s) | 13.53 m (+1.2 m/s) | |
| 11 | Emilia Sjöstrand | Sweden | 13.25 (+1.0 m/s) | 13.46 (+1.4 m/s) | 13.41 (+0.5 m/s) | 13.46 m (+1.4 m/s) | |
| 12 | Paola Borović | Croatia | x | 12.91 (+1.1 m/s) | 13.23 (+0.9 m/s) | 13.23 m (+0.9 m/s) | |
| 13 | Iuliana Dabija | Moldova | 12.88 (+1.0 m/s) | 12.96 (+1.4 m/s) | 13.03 (+0.7 m/s) | 13.03 m (+0.7 m/s) | |
| 14 | Diana Zagainova | Lithuania | 12.67 (+0.6 m/s) | 12.54 (+1.2 m/s) | x | 12.67 m (+0.6 m/s) | |

=== Final ===
The final was held on 13 August 2026, at 19:40 in the evening.

| Place | Athlete | Nation | Round | | | | | | Result | Notes |
| Place | Athlete | Nation | #1 | #2 | #3 | #4 | #5 | #6 | Result | Notes |
|---|---|---|---|---|---|---|---|---|---|---|
| 1st place, gold medalist(s) | Dariya Derkach | Italy | 14.53 (+2.1 m/s) | 14.48 (+1.3 m/s) | x | 14.60 (+1.9 m/s) | 14.29 (+1.1 m/s) | x | 14.60 m (+1.9 m/s) | EL, PB |
| 2nd place, silver medalist(s) | Saliyya Guisse | Belgium | x | 14.04 (+3.4 m/s) | 14.37 (+2.5 m/s) | 14.46 (+2.4 m/s) | x | 13.92 (+1.7 m/s) | 14.46 m (+2.4 m/s) | |
| 3rd place, bronze medalist(s) | Aleksandra Nacheva | Bulgaria | x | 14.40 (+3.4 m/s) | x | x | x | x | 14.40 m (+3.4 m/s) | |
| 4 | Ilona Masson | Belgium | 14.15 (+1.9 m/s) | 13.98 (+1.6 m/s) | 14.37 (+1.2 m/s) | 14.22 (+2.1 m/s) | x | 13.99 (+0.8 m/s) | 14.37 m (+1.2 m/s) | |
| 5 | Tuğba Danışmaz | Turkey | x | x | 14.33 (+3.0 m/s) | x | 13.94 (+1.4 m/s) | 14.04 (+1.3 m/s) | 14.33 m (+3.0 m/s) | |
| 6 | Kira Wittmann | Germany | 14.21 (+1.4 m/s) | 14.12 (+2.0 m/s) | 14.32 (+3.0 m/s) | 14.32 (+2.3 m/s) | x | 14.07 (+ m/s) | 14.32 m (+2.3 m/s) | |
| 7 | Elena Taloș | Romania | 14.23 (+1.5 m/s) | x | 13.92 (+2.1 m/s) | x | 14.05 (+1.0 m/s) | 13.94 (+0.8 m/s) | 14.23 m (+1.5 m/s) | |
| 8 | Ivana Španović | Serbia | x | 14.06 (+2.4 m/s) | 13.95 (+1.0 m/s) | 14.04 (+3.3 m/s) | x | 13.55 (+1.2 m/s) | 14.06 m (+2.4 m/s) | |
| 9 | Maja Åskag | Sweden | x | 13.99 (+2.2 m/s) | 14.04 (+1.8 m/s) | | | | 14.04 m (+1.8 m/s) | |
| 10 | Neja Filipič | Slovenia | 13.87 (+3.7 m/s) | 13.66 (+1.3 m/s) | 13.49 (+1.8 m/s) | | | | 13.87 m (+3.7 m/s) | |
| 11 | Gabriela Petrova | Bulgaria | x | x | 13.75 (+2.3 m/s) | | | | 13.75 m (+2.3 m/s) | |
| 12 | Erika Saraceni | Italy | 13.43 (+2.2 m/s) | x | 13.48 (+2.2 m/s) | | | | 13.48 m (+2.2 m/s) | |
