= 2012 World Junior Championships in Athletics – Women's triple jump =

The women's triple jump at the 2012 World Junior Championships in Athletics was held at the Estadi Olímpic Lluís Companys on 12 and 13 July.

== Medalists ==
Gold	Silver	Bronze
Ana Peleteiro; Spain	Dovilė Dzindzaletaitė; Lithuania	Liuba Zaldívar; Cuba

== Records ==
Prior to the competition, the existing world junior and championship records were as follows.

World Junior Record	Tereza Marinova (BUL)	14.62 m	Sydney, Australia	25 August 1996
Championship Record	Tereza Marinova (BUL)	14.62 m	Sydney, Australia	25 August 1996
World Junior Leading	Liuba Zaldívar (CUB)	13.91 m	Havana, Cuba	27 May 2012
Broken records during the 2012 World Junior Championships in Athletics
World Junior Leading	Ana Peleteiro (ESP)	14.17	Barcelona, Spain	13 July 2012
World Junior Leading	Dovilė Dzindzaletaitė (LTU)	14.17	Barcelona, Spain	13 July 2012

== Results ==
=== Qualification ===
Qualification: Standard 13.30 m (Q) or at least best 12 qualified (q)

Rank	Group	Name	Nationality	#1	#2	#3	Result	Note
1	A	Dovilé Dzindzaletaité	Lithuania	13.25	13.85		13.85	Q
2	B	Liuba Zaldívar	Cuba	13.80			13.80	Q
3	A	Ana Peleteiro	Spain	13.63			13.63	Q, NJ
4	A	Francesca Lanciano	Italy	X	X	13.59	13.59	Q, NJ
5	B	Ekaterina Sariyeva	Azerbaijan	12.43	13.37		13.37	Q, NJ
6	A	Hanna Aleksandrova	Ukraine	13.12	13.19	13.32	13.32	Q
7	B	Ottavia Cestonaro	Italy	13.00	13.23	X	13.23	q
8	A	Darya Nelovko	Russia	X	12.65	13.18	13.18	q
9	B	Ciarra Brewer	United States	13.02	12.81	13.11	13.11	q
10	B	Dilyara Abuova	Kazakhstan	X	12.91	13.06	13.06	q
11	A	Mudan Chen	China	12.61	X	13.01	13.01	q
12	B	Victoria Leonova	Russia	12.96	X	12.92	12.96	q
13	B	Rabaa Rezgui	Tunisia	12.30	12.79	12.96	12.96	
14	A	Sabrina Mickenautsch	Germany	12.84	11.42	12.68	12.84	
15	A	Rouguy Diallo	France	12.53	12.69	12.81	12.81	
16	A	Jennifer Madu	United States	12.38	12.68	12.74	12.74	
17	B	Petra Koren	Slovenia	X	12.70	12.53	12.70	
18	A	Ivonne Rangel	Mexico	X	12.45	12.68	12.68	
19	A	Thea LaFond	Dominica	11.99	X	12.66	12.66	
20	B	Anna Krasutska	Ukraine	12.46	12.49	12.42	12.49	
21	B	Anastasiya Baykova	Uzbekistan	12.45	12.22	12.33	12.45	
22	A	Melika Kasumovic	Bosnia and Herzegovina	X	12.39	12.33	12.39	
23	A	Pei-Ning Hung	Chinese Taipei	X	12.21	12.35	12.35	
24	A	Josie Nichol	Australia	12.20	X	X	12.20	
25	B	Esra Emiroglu	Turkey	11.70	12.12	X	12.12	
26	B	Tatia Paikidze	Georgia	11.46	X	X	11.46	
-	B	Lynn Johnson	Sweden	X			NM	

=== Final ===
Rank	Name	Nationality	#1	#2	#3	#4	#5	#6	Result	Note
1st place, gold medalist(s)	Ana Peleteiro	Spain	13.64	13.96	14.17	13.80	X	X	14.17	WJL
2nd place, silver medalist(s)	Dovilé Dzindzaletaité	Lithuania	13.59	X	13.73	13.60	14.17	X	14.17	WJL, NR
3rd place, bronze medalist(s)	Liuba Zaldívar	Cuba	13.62	13.90	13.89	X	13.61	13.38	13.90	
4	Ganna Aleksandrova	Ukraine	13.27	13.48	13.21	13.42	13.42	13.39	13.48	
5	Mudan Chen	China	X	13.42	13.27	13.21	X	13.14	13.42	
6	Ciarra Brewer	United States	X	13.38	13.37	13.15	12.97	13.18	13.38	
7	Yekaterina Sariyeva	Azerbaijan	13.33	12.35	X	12.65	12.75	X	13.33	
8	Ottavia Cestonaro	Italy	13.14	13.29	13.29	13.17	X	12.76	13.29	
9	Dilyara Abuova	Kazakhstan	13.11	12.97	13.26				13.26	PB
10	Victoria Leonova	Russia	13.10	13.09	12.89				13.10	
11	Daria Nelovko	Russia	12.87	12.98	12.61				12.98	
12	Francesca Lanciano	Italy	12.86	12.95	12.87				12.95	

== Participation ==
According to an unofficial count, 27 athletes from 23 countries participated in the event.

- Australia (1)
- Azerbaijan (1)
- Bosnia and Herzegovina (1)
- China (1)
- Chinese Taipei (1)
- Cuba (1)
- Dominica (1)
- France (1)
- Georgia (1)
- Germany (1)
- Italy (2)
- Kazakhstan (1)
- Lithuania (1)
- Mexico (1)
- Russia (2)
- Slovenia (1)
- Spain (1)
- Sweden (1)
- Tunisia (1)
- Turkey (1)
- Ukraine (2)
- United States (2)
- Uzbekistan (1)
