= Caroline Joyeux =

German triple jumper (born 2001)

Personal information
- Born: 26 March 2001 (age 25)

Sport
- Sport: Athletics
- Event: Triple jump

Achievements and titles
- Personal bests: Triple jump: 14.45m (Essen, 2025)

Caroline Joyeux (born 26 March 2001) is a German triple jumper. She won the German Athletics Championships and European Team Championships First Division in 2025, and placed tenth representing Germany at the 2025 World Athletics Championships.

== Biography ==
From Berlin, she is a member of LG Nord Berlin having joined the club at the age of 8 years-old. In 2018, at the age of 17 years-old she became German U18 champion in the triple jump. The following year she won the German U20 Indoor Championships with a new personal best jump of 12.99 meters.

She transitioned to the senior ranks, placing sixth in the final of the German Indoor Championships in 2021. She placed fifth at the 2021 European Athletics U23 Championships in Tallinn.

She jumped a personal best of 14.45 metres in Essen in June 2025. Later that month, she jumped 14.42 metres to win the triple jump on her senior international debut for Germany at the 2025 European Athletics Team Championships First Division in Madrid. In August, she jumped 14.24 metres to win ahead of Kira Wittmann at the German Championships in August 2025 in Dresden. In September 2025, she competed at the 2025 World Championships in Tokyo, Japan, qualifying for the final and placing tenth overall.

Joyeaux was runner-up to Kira Wittmann at the German Indoor Championships on 28 February 2026. In August 2026, she competed at the 2026 European Athletics Championships in Birmingham, England.

== Personal life ==
In 2020 she met pole vaulter EJ Obiena at a training camp in Italy with the pair starting a relationship. She attended the 2024 Olympic Games to support him competing for the Philippines.
