= 2014 World Junior Championships in Athletics – Women's triple jump =

Key to notes
- WJR: World Junior Record
- CR: Championship Record
- WJL: World Junior Leading
- AJR: Area Junior Record
- NJR: National Junior Record
- PB: Personal Best
- SB: Season Best
- DNS: Did not start
- DNF: Did not finish
- NM: No mark

Key to results
- Q: Automatic qualification
- q: Qualified as best performer
- X: Fail

The women's triple jump events at the 2014 World Junior Championships in Athletics took place at Hayward Field in Eugene, Oregon, United States on 24 and 26 July 2014.

== Medalists ==
Gold	Silver	Bronze
Rouguy Diallo; France	Liadagmis Povea; Cuba	Li Xiaohong; China

== Records ==
Prior to the competition, the existing world junior and championship records were as follows.

World Junior Record	Tereza Marinova (BUL)	14.62 m	Sydney, Australia	25 August 1996
Championship Record	Tereza Marinova (BUL)	14.62 m	Sydney, Australia	25 August 1996
World Junior Leading	Ana Peleteiro (ESP)	14.07 m	Salamanca, Spain	12 June 2014
Broken records during the 2014 World Junior Championships in Athletics
World Junior Leading	Rouguy Diallo (FRA)	14.44 m	Eugene, United States	26 July 2014

== Results ==
=== Qualification ===
Qualification: Standard 13.30 m (Q) or at least 12 best performers (q).

Rank	Group	Name	Nation	Result	Note
1	B	Rouguy Diallo	France	13.77	Q, NJR
2	B	Liadagmis Povea	Cuba	13.55	Q
3	B	Keturah Orji	United States	13.46	Q, SB
4	A	Elena Panțuroiu	Romania	13.38	Q
5	B	Li Xiaohong	China	13.38	Q
6	B	Ana Peleteiro	Spain	13.30	Q
7	A	Núbia Soares	Brazil	13.27	q
8	B	Aliyah Johnson	Australia	13.26	q, PB
9	A	Valeriya Fedorova	Russia	13.21	q
10	A	Marshay Ryan	United States	13.21	q
11	B	Ottavia Cestonaro	Italy	13.16	q
12	A	Anna Krasutska	Ukraine	13.14	q
13	B	Gabriele dos Santos	Brazil	13.13	
14	B	Isabella Marten	Germany	13.11	
15	B	Andreea Lefcenco	Romania	13.10	
16	A	Paola Borović	Croatia	13.02	NJR
17	A	Yulimar Rojas	Venezuela	12.99	
18	B	Jhoanmy Luque	Venezuela	12.97	
19	B	Tamara Moncrieffe	Jamaica	12.92	
20	A	Wang Rong	China	12.92	
21	A	Eva Mustar	Slovenia	12.88	
22	A	Zinzi Chabangu	South Africa	12.84	
23	B	Monika Banovicová	Slovakia	12.81	
24	B	Nhayilla Rentería	Colombia	12.60	
25	A	Vidusha Lakshani Heenatimullage Dona	Sri Lanka	12.52	
26	B	Eszter Bajnok	Hungary	12.48	
27	A	Benedetta Cuneo	Italy	12.47	
28	A	Elza Norina	Latvia	12.39	
29	A	Kirthana Ramasamy	Malaysia	12.32	
30	B	Tina Božič	Slovenia	12.31	
—N/a	A	Cora Salas	Spain	NM	

=== Final ===
Summary:

Rank	Name	Nation	1	2	3	4	5	6	Result	Note
1st place, gold medalist(s)	Rouguy Diallo	France	14.24	X	14.44	14.20	X	13.98	14.44	PB, NJR (Note: Diallo's first and third attempts of 14.24 and 14.44 were not accepted as national junior records as there was too much tailwind when they were made. Her fourth attempt of 14.20 was officially accepted as a national junior record for France.)
2nd place, silver medalist(s)	Liadagmis Povea	Cuba	14.02	14.07	14.02	13.94	14.00	X	14.07	
3rd place, bronze medalist(s)	Li Xiaohong	China	X	13.75	13.79	14.01	14.03	13.93	14.03	
4	Valeriya Fedorova	Russia	X	13.71	13.96	13.14	13.58	13.53	13.46	
5	Elena Panțuroiu	Romania	13.61	X	13.49	13.73	13.69	12.19	13.73	
6	Ana Peleteiro	Spain	X	13.34	13.71	13.63	13.62	13.54	13.71	
7	Marshay Ryan	United States	13.28	13.53	13.36	13.21	X	13.60	13.60	PB
8	Núbia Soares	Brazil	X	13.42	13.25	13.53	X	X	13.53	
9	Keturah Orji	United States	13.29	13.23	12.93	—N/a			13.29	
10	Anna Krasutska	Ukraine	13.08	12.91	12.93	—N/a			13.08	
11	Ottavia Cestonaro	Italy	X	X	13.03	—N/a			13.03	
12	Aliyah Johnson	Australia	12.50	12.49	12.69	—N/a			12.69	
