= Neja Filipič =

Slovenian athlete (born 1995)

Personal information
- Born: 22 April 1995 (age 31) Ljubljana, Slovenia
- Height: 1.72 m (5 ft 8 in)
- Weight: 56 kg (123 lb)

Sport
- Sport: Athletics
- Events: Long jump, triple jump
- Club: AD Kronos Ljubljana; AD MASS Ljubljana
- Coached by: Maraž Saša

Neja Filipič (born 22 April 1995) is a Slovenian athlete specialising in the long jump and triple jump. She won a bronze medal in the latter at the 2019 Summer Universiade.

== International competitions ==
Year	Competition	Venue	Position	Event	Notes
Representing Slovenia
2016	Mediterranean U23 Championships	Tunis, Tunisia	2nd	Long jump	6.20 m
2016	European Championships	Amsterdam, Netherlands	21st (q)	Long jump	6.24 m
2017	European U23 Championships	Bydgoszcz, Poland	6th	Long jump	6.42 m
2018	European Championships	Berlin, Germany	–	Long jump	NM
2019	Universiade	Naples, Italy	13th (q)	Long jump	6.11 m
2019	Universiade	Naples, Italy	3rd	Triple jump	13.73 m
2021	European Indoor Championships	Toruń, Poland	8th	Triple jump	14.02 m
2022	World Indoor Championships	Belgrade, Serbia	10th	Triple jump	14.13 m
2022	Mediterranean Games	Oran, Algeria	4th	Long jump	6.45 m
2022	Mediterranean Games	Oran, Algeria	1st	Triple jump	14.16 m
2022	World Championships	Eugene, United States	16th (q)	Triple jump	14.05 m
2022	European Championships	Munich, Germany	–	Triple jump	NM
2023	European Indoor Championships	Istanbul, Turkey	5th	Triple jump	13.92 m
2023	World Championships	Budapest, Hungary	25th (q)	Triple jump	13.64 m
2024	World Indoor Championships	Glasgow, United Kingdom	11th	Triple jump	13.62 m
2024	European Championships	Rome, Italy	18th (q)	Long jump	6.53 m
2024	European Championships	Rome, Italy	7th	Triple jump	14.12 m
2024	Olympic Games	Paris, France	18th (q)	Triple jump	13.85 m
2025	European Indoor Championships	Apeldoorn, Netherlands	8th	Triple jump	13.39 m
2025	World Indoor Championships	Nanjing, China	6th	Triple jump	13.92 m
2025	World Championships	Tokyo, Japan	9th	Triple jump	14.03 m
2026	World Indoor Championships	Toruń, Poland	11th	Triple jump	13.35 m
2026	European Championships	Birmingham, United Kingdom	10th	Triple jump	13.87 m (w)

== Personal bests ==
Outdoor

- Long jump – 6.56 (+1.6 m/s, Slovenska Bistrica 2020)
- Triple jump – 14.22 (+0.5 m/s, Maribor 2020)

Indoor

- Long jump – 6.30 (Belgrade 2017)
- Triple jump – 13.49 (Novo Mesto 2020)
