= Athletics at the 2019 Summer Universiade – Women's triple jump =

The women's triple jump event at the 2019 Summer Universiade was held on 10 and 12 July at the Stadio San Paolo in Naples.

== Medalists ==
Gold	Silver	Bronze
Olha Korsun; Ukraine	Evelise Veiga; Portugal	Neja Filipič; Slovenia

== Results ==
=== Qualification ===
Qualification: 13.90 m (Q) or at least 12 best (q) qualified for the final.

Rank	Group	Name	Nationality	#1	#2	#3	Result	Notes
1	B	Olha Korsun	Ukraine	13.75	x	–	13.75	q, PB
2	A	Anna Krasutska	Ukraine	13.43	13.05	13.68	13.68	q
3	A	Li Ying	China	13.24	x	13.65w	13.65w	q
4	B	Neja Filipič	Slovenia	13.53	13.53	13.61	13.61	q
5	B	Evelise Veiga	Portugal	x	13.51	13.59	13.59	q
6	B	Ottavia Cestonaro	Italy	13.55	13.41	13.20	13.55	q
7	A	Mariya Ovchinnikova	Kazakhstan	13.41	13.17	13.28	13.41	q
8	A	Parinya Chuaimaroeng	Thailand	x	13.04	13.40	13.40	q
9	A	Ana Margarida Oliveira	Portugal	13.20	13.19	13.27	13.27	q, SB
10	A	Francesca Lanciano	Italy	13.24	13.15	13.16	13.24	q
11	B	Beyza Tilki	Turkey	13.14	13.24	13.03	13.24	q
12	A	Zinzi Chabangu	South Africa	12.88	12.93	13.19	13.19	q
13	A	Emma Pullola	Finland	13.10	13.16	x	13.16	
14	B	Kelly McKee	United States	13.15	11.92	12.48	13.15	
15	A	Renu	India	12.84	13.01	x	13.01	
16	B	Rebecka Abrahamsson	Sweden	x	x	12.93	12.93	SB
17	B	Dilyara Abuova	Kazakhstan	12.88	x	12.89	12.89	
18	B	Tahti Alver	Estonia	x	12.76	12.72	12.76	
19	B	Fu Luna	China	x	12.75	x	12.75	
20	B	Monika Benserud	Norway	12.69	x	12.46	12.69	
21	A	Andreea Simona Lefcenco	Romania	12.39	x	12.67	12.67	
22	B	Niharika Vashisht	India	12.44	12.58	12.59	12.59	
23	A	Annabel Luuk	Estonia	12.41	x	x	12.41	
24	B	Kaoutar Selmi	Algeria	12.33	x	11.60	12.33	
25	A	Hasini Probodha Balasooriya	Sri Lanka	12.25	12.22	x	12.25	

=== Final ===
Official Video

Rank	Name	Nationality	#1	#2	#3	#4	#5	#6	Result	Notes
1st place, gold medalist(s)	Olha Korsun	Ukraine	13.40	x	13.64	13.60	x	13.90	13.90	PB
2nd place, silver medalist(s)	Evelise Veiga	Portugal	13.62	x	13.81	11.37	13.79	x	13.81	
3rd place, bronze medalist(s)	Neja Filipič	Slovenia	13.21	13.42	11.13	13.08	13.73	13.14	13.73	
4	Li Ying	China	13.66	x	13.48	13.14	–	13.54	13.66	
5	Anna Krasutska	Ukraine	13.23	x	13.56	13.46	13.32	13.51	13.56	
6	Francesca Lanciano	Italy	13.43	13.46	13.40	13.30	13.34	13.18	13.46	
7	Zinzi Chabangu	South Africa	13.21	13.25	13.42	13.16	11.74	13.24	13.42	
8	Mariya Ovchinnikova	Kazakhstan	13.37	13.19	13.15	13.24	13.18	13.15	13.37	
9	Ottavia Cestonaro	Italy	13.32	x	11.69				13.32	
10	Beyza Tilki	Turkey	13.24	12.89	x				13.24	
11	Parinya Chuaimaroeng	Thailand	x	12.88	13.18				13.18	
12	Ana Margarida Oliveira	Portugal	12.63	12.98	13.02				13.02	
