= Kira Wittmann =

German triple jumper (born 2000)

Personal information
- Born: 13 July 2000 (age 26)

Sport
- Sport: Athletics
- Event: Triple jump

Achievements and titles
- Personal bests: Triple jump: 14.26m (Birmingham, 2026)

Kira Wittmann (born 13 July 2000) is a German triple jumper. She is a multiple-time German national champion, both outdoors and indoors.

== Biography ==
From Badbergen, Wittman became interested in athletics through the Federal Youth Games. As a 12-year-old she began training at SV Quitt Ankum and was initially a sprinter and long jumper before transitioning to the triple jump from the age of 15 years-old. She won the 2017 German Youth Championships in Ulm with a personal best 12.87 metres. She also placed third with 6.04 meters in the long jump at the championships. Wittmann won the German under-20 title in the triple jump in 2018. The following year, Wittmann achieved a new personal best of 13.20 metres to place securing a fourth place finish at the 2019 European Athletics U20 Championships.

A member of LG Göttingen from 2019 and based in Hanover, coached by Frank Reinhardt, Wittman had a seventh place finish at the 2021 European Athletics U23 Championships. She won the senior German Indoor Athletics Championships in February 2023, making a personal best jump of 14.08 metres, jumping over 14 metres for the first time. At the age of 22 years-old, she was the third youngest German woman to achieve that distinction. She subsequently represented Germany at the 2023 European Athletics Indoor Championships in Istanbul, reaching the final of the women’s triple jump, and placing seventh overall. Wittmann jumped 13.64 meters without advancing to the final at the 2023 World Athletics Championships in Budapest, Hungary.

Wittmann placed second to Jessie Maduka at the German Indor Championships in February 2024. She won the German Athletics Championships in June 2024 with a jump of 13.74 metres in Braunschweig.

Wittmann represented Germany at the 2025 European Athletics Indoor Championships in Apeldoorn, Netherlands in March 2025, without advancing to the final. Wittmann jumped 13.97 metres in finishing runner-up to Caroline Joyeux at the German Championships in August 2025 in Dresden. Wittmann won ahead of Joyeux at the German Indoor Championships on 28 February 2026, winning the title with a best jump of 13.94 metres. In August 2026, she competed at the 2026 European Athletics Championships in Birmingham, England, placing sixth overall, and jumping a new personal best of 14.26 metres in the qualifying round.
