= 2013 European Athletics U23 Championships – Women's triple jump =

The Women's triple jump event at the 2013 European Athletics U23 Championships was held in Tampere, Finland, at Ratina Stadium on 11 and 12 July.

== Medalists ==
| Gold | Gabriela Petrova; Bulgaria |
| Silver | Dariya Derkach; Italy |
| Bronze | Maja Bratkič; Slovenia |

== Results ==
=== Final ===
12 July 2013

| Rank | Name | Nationality | Attempts | | | | | | Result | Notes |
| Rank | Name | Nationality | 1 | 2 | 3 | 4 | 5 | 6 | Result | Notes |
|---|---|---|---|---|---|---|---|---|---|---|
| 1st place, gold medalist(s) | Gabriela Petrova | Bulgaria | x (w: +1.0 m/s) | 13.46 (w: +0.4 m/s) | x (w: +0.5 m/s) | 13.23 (w: -0.1 m/s) | 13.25 (w: 0.0 m/s) | 13.91 (w: +0.6 m/s) | 13.91 (w: +0.6 m/s) | PB |
| 2nd place, silver medalist(s) | Dariya Derkach | Italy | x (w: +0.4 m/s) | 13.28 (w: +1.5 m/s) | 13.56 (w: +1.5 m/s) | 11.83 (w: +0.1 m/s) | 13.54 (w: +1.7 m/s) | x (w: +0.9 m/s) | 13.56 (w: +1.5 m/s) | |
| 3rd place, bronze medalist(s) | Maja Bratkič | Slovenia | 12.10 (w: -0.5 m/s) | 12.44 (w: -0.7 m/s) | 13.33 (w: -0.1 m/s) | 12.89 (w: +0.3 m/s) | 13.52 (w: -0.2 m/s) | 12.75 (w: +1.2 m/s) | 13.52 (w: -0.2 m/s) | |
| 4 | Hanna Aleksandrova | Ukraine | 13.28 (w: 0.0 m/s) | 13.00 (w: -0.9 m/s) | 13.46 (w: +0.1 m/s) | 13.37 (w: +0.3 m/s) | 13.33 (w: -0.3 m/s) | 13.42 (w: +0.8 m/s) | 13.46 (w: +0.1 m/s) | =SB |
| 5 | Yana Borodina | Russia | 13.42 (w: -0.3 m/s) | 13.31 (w: -0.5 m/s) | 13.45 (w: +0.6 m/s) | 12.06 (w: -0.4 m/s) | x (w: +0.7 m/s) | x (w: +2.1 m/s) | 13.45 (w: +0.6 m/s) | |
| 6 | Iryna Vaskouskaya | Belarus | 13.07 (w: +0.3 m/s) | 13.33 (w: +0.9 m/s) | 13.35 (w: +1.1 m/s) | x (w: -0.4 m/s) | 13.10 (w: +0.2 m/s) | 13.31 (w: +1.4 m/s) | 13.35 (w: +1.1 m/s) | |
| 7 | Santa Matule | Latvia | x (w: +0.6 m/s) | 13.18 (w: -0.1 m/s) | x (w: +0.1 m/s) | x (w: +0.7 m/s) | 13.13 (w: +0.1 m/s) | 13.13 (w: +0.1 m/s) | 13.18 (w: -0.1 m/s) | |
| 8 | Neele Eckhardt | Germany | 13.04 (w: 0.0 m/s) | 12.75 (w: -0.1 m/s) | 13.16 (w: +0.1 m/s) | x (w: +0.3 m/s) | 12.68 (w: -0.3 m/s) | x (w: +1.1 m/s) | 13.16 (w: +0.1 m/s) | |
| 9 | Dovilė Dzindzaletaitė | Lithuania | 13.11 (w: 0.0 m/s) | x (w: -0.3 m/s) | 13.05 (w: +0.8 m/s) | | | | 13.11 (w: 0.0 m/s) | |
| 10 | Elina Sterzing | Germany | 13.08 (w: 0.0 m/s) | x (w: -0.2 m/s) | 12.90 (w: -0.1 m/s) | | | | 13.08 (w: 0.0 m/s) | |
| 11 | Tatiana Cicanci | Moldova | 12.93 (w: +1.1 m/s) | 12.93 (w: -0.4 m/s) | x (w: +0.4 m/s) | | | | 12.93 (w: +1.1 m/s) | |
| | Andrea Calleja | Spain | x (w: -0.5 m/s) | x (w: -0.1 m/s) | x (w: 0.0 m/s) | | | | NM | |

=== Qualifications ===
Qualified: qualifying perf. 13.45 (Q) or 12 best performers (q) advance to the Final

==== Summary ====
| Rank | Name | Nationality | Result | Notes |
|---|---|---|---|---|
| 1 | Gabriela Petrova | Bulgaria | 13.57 | Q |
| 2 | Maja Bratkič | Slovenia | 13.44 | q |
| 3 | Dariya Derkach | Italy | 13.37 | q |
| 4 | Hanna Aleksandrova | Ukraine | 13.35 | q |
| 5 | Iryna Vaskouskaya | Belarus | 13.34 | q |
| 6 | Dovilė Dzindzaletaitė | Lithuania | 13.33 | q |
| 7 | Yana Borodina | Russia | 13.26 | q |
| 8 | Santa Matule | Latvia | 13.24 | q SB |
| 9 | Tatiana Cicanci | Moldova | 13.21 | q SB |
| 10 | Neele Eckhardt | Germany | 13.18 | q |
| 11 | Elina Sterzing | Germany | 13.00 | q |
| 12 | Andrea Calleja | Spain | 12.98 | q |
| 13 | Maria Moro | Italy | 12.97 | |
| 14 | Shaina Anthony Mags | Portugal | 12.81 | |
| 15 | Saša Babšek | Slovenia | 12.80 | |
| 16 | Sabrina Mickenautsch | Germany | 12.80 | |
| 17 | Kateryna Kravchenko | Ukraine | 12.55 | |
| 18 | Petra Koren | Slovenia | 12.18 | SB |
| 19 | Daryia Kucharava | Belarus | 12.09 | |
| | Jeanine Assani Issouf | France | NM | |

==== Details ====
===== Group A =====
11 July 2013 / 19:30

| Rank | Name | Nationality | Attempts | | | Result | Notes |
| Rank | Name | Nationality | 1 | 2 | 3 | Result | Notes |
|---|---|---|---|---|---|---|---|
| 1 | Gabriela Petrova | Bulgaria | 13.18 (w: -1.1 m/s) | 13.57 (w: 0.0 m/s) | | 13.57 (w: 0.0 m/s) | Q |
| 2 | Dariya Derkach | Italy | 13.20 (w: -0.4 m/s) | x (w: -0.2 m/s) | 13.37 (w: -0.1 m/s) | 13.37 (w: -0.1 m/s) | q |
| 3 | Hanna Aleksandrova | Ukraine | 13.06 (w: -0.6 m/s) | 13.35 (w: 0.0 m/s) | 13.07 (w: +0.7 m/s) | 13.35 (w: 0.0 m/s) | q |
| 4 | Dovilė Dzindzaletaitė | Lithuania | 13.31 (w: +0.8 m/s) | 13.33 (w: -0.4 m/s) | x (w: -0.1 m/s) | 13.33 (w: -0.4 m/s) | q |
| 5 | Santa Matule | Latvia | 12.93 (w: +0.7 m/s) | 13.05 (w: -0.3 m/s) | 13.24 (w: +1.0 m/s) | 13.24 (w: +1.0 m/s) | q SB |
| 6 | Tatiana Cicanci | Moldova | 12.83 (w: +0.3 m/s) | 12.99 (w: +0.1 m/s) | 13.21 (w: -0.8 m/s) | 13.21 (w: -0.8 m/s) | q SB |
| 7 | Neele Eckhardt | Germany | 12.81 (w: 0.0 m/s) | 13.10 (w: -0.3 m/s) | 13.18 (w: +0.9 m/s) | 13.18 (w: +0.9 m/s) | q |
| 8 | Andrea Calleja | Spain | 12.55 (w: 0.0 m/s) | 12.86 (w: +0.6 m/s) | 12.98 (w: -0.6 m/s) | 12.98 (w: -0.6 m/s) | q |
| 9 | Saša Babšek | Slovenia | 12.52 (w: -0.5 m/s) | 12.80 (w: +0.6 m/s) | 12.36 (w: +0.5 m/s) | 12.80 (w: +0.6 m/s) | |
| 10 | Daryia Kucharava | Belarus | 12.09 (w: +0.9 m/s) | x (w: 0.0 m/s) | x (w: -0.2 m/s) | 12.09 (w: +0.9 m/s) | |

===== Group B =====
11 July 2013 / 19:30

| Rank | Name | Nationality | Attempts | | | Result | Notes |
| Rank | Name | Nationality | 1 | 2 | 3 | Result | Notes |
|---|---|---|---|---|---|---|---|
| 1 | Maja Bratkič | Slovenia | 13.08 (w: -0.4 m/s) | 13.07 (w: -0.3 m/s) | 13.44 (w: 0.0 m/s) | 13.44 (w: 0.0 m/s) | q |
| 2 | Iryna Vaskouskaya | Belarus | 13.34 (w: -0.4 m/s) | 13.33 (w: +0.9 m/s) | 12.93 (w: -0.7 m/s) | 13.34 (w: -0.4 m/s) | q |
| 3 | Yana Borodina | Russia | 13.26 (w: -0.5 m/s) | 13.26 (w: +0.9 m/s) | 11.91 (w: +0.1 m/s) | 13.26 (w: -0.5 m/s) | q |
| 4 | Elina Sterzing | Germany | 13.00 (w: +0.5 m/s) | x (w: 0.0 m/s) | 12.87 (w: -0.2 m/s) | 13.00 (w: +0.5 m/s) | q |
| 5 | Maria Moro | Italy | 12.72 (w: +0.6 m/s) | x (w: -0.6 m/s) | 12.97 (w: -0.1 m/s) | 12.97 (w: -0.1 m/s) | |
| 6 | Shaina Anthony Mags | Portugal | 12.40 (w: +0.2 m/s) | 12.81 (w: +1.1 m/s) | x (w: +0.4 m/s) | 12.81 (w: +1.1 m/s) | |
| 7 | Sabrina Mickenautsch | Germany | 12.80 (w: +0.7 m/s) | 11.51 (w: -0.1 m/s) | 12.17 (w: 0.0 m/s) | 12.80 (w: +0.7 m/s) | |
| 8 | Kateryna Kravchenko | Ukraine | 12.55 (w: -0.1 m/s) | 12.53 (w: +0.7 m/s) | 12.54 (w: +1.0 m/s) | 12.55 (w: -0.1 m/s) | |
| 9 | Petra Koren | Slovenia | 12.18 (w: -0.6 m/s) | x (w: -0.2 m/s) | x (w: +0.4 m/s) | 12.18 (w: -0.6 m/s) | SB |
| | Jeanine Assani Issouf | France | x (w: -1.2 m/s) | x (w: +0.7 m/s) | x (w: -1.3 m/s) | NM | |

== Participation ==
According to an unofficial count, 20 athletes from 13 countries participated in the event.

- Belarus (2)
- Bulgaria (1)
- France (1)
- Germany (3)
- Italy (2)
- Latvia (1)
- Lithuania (1)
- Moldova (1)
- Portugal (1)
- Russia (1)
- Slovenia (3)
- Spain (1)
- Ukraine (2)
