= Nadia Akpana Assa =

Norwegian long jumper

Personal information
- Born: 22 December 1995 (age 29)
- Height: 1.76 m (5 ft 9 in)
- Weight: 57 kg (126 lb)

Sport
- Sport: Athletics
- Event: Long jump
- Club: IL i BUL

Nadia Akpana Assa (born 22 December 1995 in Oslo) is a Norwegian athlete specialising in the long jump. She won the silver medal at the 2014 World Junior Championships. Her parents came to Norway from Togo in the mid-1980s.

Her personal bests in the event are 6.53 metres outdoors (+0.4 m/s, Copenhagen 2016) and 6.37 metres indoors (Bærum 2016).

== International competitions ==
Year	Competition	Venue	Position	Event	Notes
Representing Norway
2013	European Junior Championships	Rieti, Italy	19th (q)	Long jump	5.96 m
2014	World Junior Championships	Eugene, United States	2nd	Long jump	6.31 m
2015	European Indoor Championships	Prague, Czech Republic	19th (q)	Long jump	6.08 m
2015	European U23 Championships	Tallinn, Estonia	8th	Long jump	6.42 m
2016	European Championships	Amsterdam, Netherlands	8th	Long jump	6.51 m
2017	European U23 Championships	Bydgoszcz, Poland	8th	Long jump	6.29 m (w)
