= Tetyana Ptashkina =

Ukrainian triple jumper

Personal information
- Born: 10 January 1993 (age 33) Luhansk, Ukraine

Sport
- Sport: Track and field
- Event: Triple jump

Tetyana Ptashkina (Cyrillic: Тетяна Пташкіна; born 10 January 1993) is a Ukrainian athlete whose specialty is the triple jump. She competed at the 2015 World Championships in Beijing without qualifying for the final. Her personal bests in the event are 14.08 metres outdoors (+1.1 m/s, Tallinn 2015) and 13.67 metres indoors (Sumy 2015).

== Competition record ==
| Year | Competition | Venue | Position | Event | Notes |
Representing Ukraine
| 2015 | European Indoor Championships | Prague, Czech Republic | 20th (q) | Triple jump | 13.41 m |
| 2015 | European U23 Championships | Tallinn, Estonia | 3rd | Triple jump | 14.05 m |
| 2015 | World Championships | Beijing, China | 27th (q) | Triple jump | 13.05 m |
