= Elena Andreea Taloș =

Romanian triple jumper

Personal information
- Born: Elena Andreea Panțuroiu; 24 February 1995 (age 31) Câmpulung, Romania
- Height: .70 m (2 ft 4 in)

Sport
- Sport: Track and field
- Events: Triple jump, long jump
- Club: CS Onești

Elena Andreea Taloș (née Panțuroiu; born 24 February 1995) is a Romanian athlete whose specialty is the triple jump. She participated in the 2015 World Championships in Beijing without qualifying for the final. She also sometimes competes in the long jump and combined events.

Her personal bests in the triple jump are 14.33 metres outdoors (+1.0 m/s, Pitesti 2016) and 14.33 metres indoors (Bucharest 2017).

== Competition record ==
Year	Competition	Venue	Position	Event	Notes
Representing Romania
2011	World Youth Championships	Lille, France	24th (q)	Triple jump	12.19 m
2013	European Junior Championships	Rieti, Italy	2nd	Triple jump	13.36 m
2014	World Junior Championships	Eugene, United States	5th	Triple jump	13.73 m (w)
2015	European Indoor Championships	Prague, Czech Republic	17th (q)	Triple jump	13.59 m
2015	European U23 Championships	Tallinn, Estonia	19th (q)	Long jump	6.04 m
2015	European U23 Championships	Tallinn, Estonia	2nd	Triple jump	14.13 m
2015	World Championships	Beijing, China	18th (q)	Triple jump	13.58 m
2016	World Indoor Championships	Portland, United States	5th	Triple jump	14.11 m
2016	European Championships	Amsterdam, Netherlands	16th (q)	Triple jump	13.63 m
2016	Olympic Games	Rio de Janeiro, Brazil	16th (q)	Triple jump	14.00 m
2017	European Indoor Championships	Belgrade, Serbia	11th (q)	Triple jump	13.84 m
2017	European U23 Championships	Bydgoszcz, Poland	25th (q)	Long jump	5.98 m
2017	European U23 Championships	Bydgoszcz, Poland	1st	Triple jump	14.27 m
2017	World Championships	London, United Kingdom	14th (q)	Triple jump	14.02 m
2018	World Indoor Championships	Birmingham, United Kingdom	4th	Triple jump	14.33 m
2018	European Championships	Berlin, Germany	4th	Triple jump	14.38 m
2019	World Championships	Doha, Qatar	11th	Triple jump	14.07 m
2022	European Championships	Munich, Germany	8th	Triple jump	14.01 m
2023	European Indoor Championships	Istanbul, Turkey	13th (q)	Triple jump	13.39 m
2023	World Championships	Budapest, Hungary	15th (q)	Triple jump	14.06 m
2024	World Indoor Championships	Glasgow, United Kingdom	10th	Triple jump	13.65 m
2024	European Championships	Rome, Italy	20th (q)	Triple jump	13.59 m
2024	Olympic Games	Paris, France	10th	Triple jump	14.03 m
2025	European Indoor Championships	Apeldoorn, Netherlands	–	Triple jump	NM
2025	World Championships	Tokyo, Japan	15th (q)	Triple jump	13.85 m
2026	World Indoor Championships	Toruń, Poland	9th	Triple jump	13.98 m
2026	European Championships	Birmingham, United Kingdom	7th	Triple jump	14.23 m
