= Yanis David =

French triple jumper (born 1987)

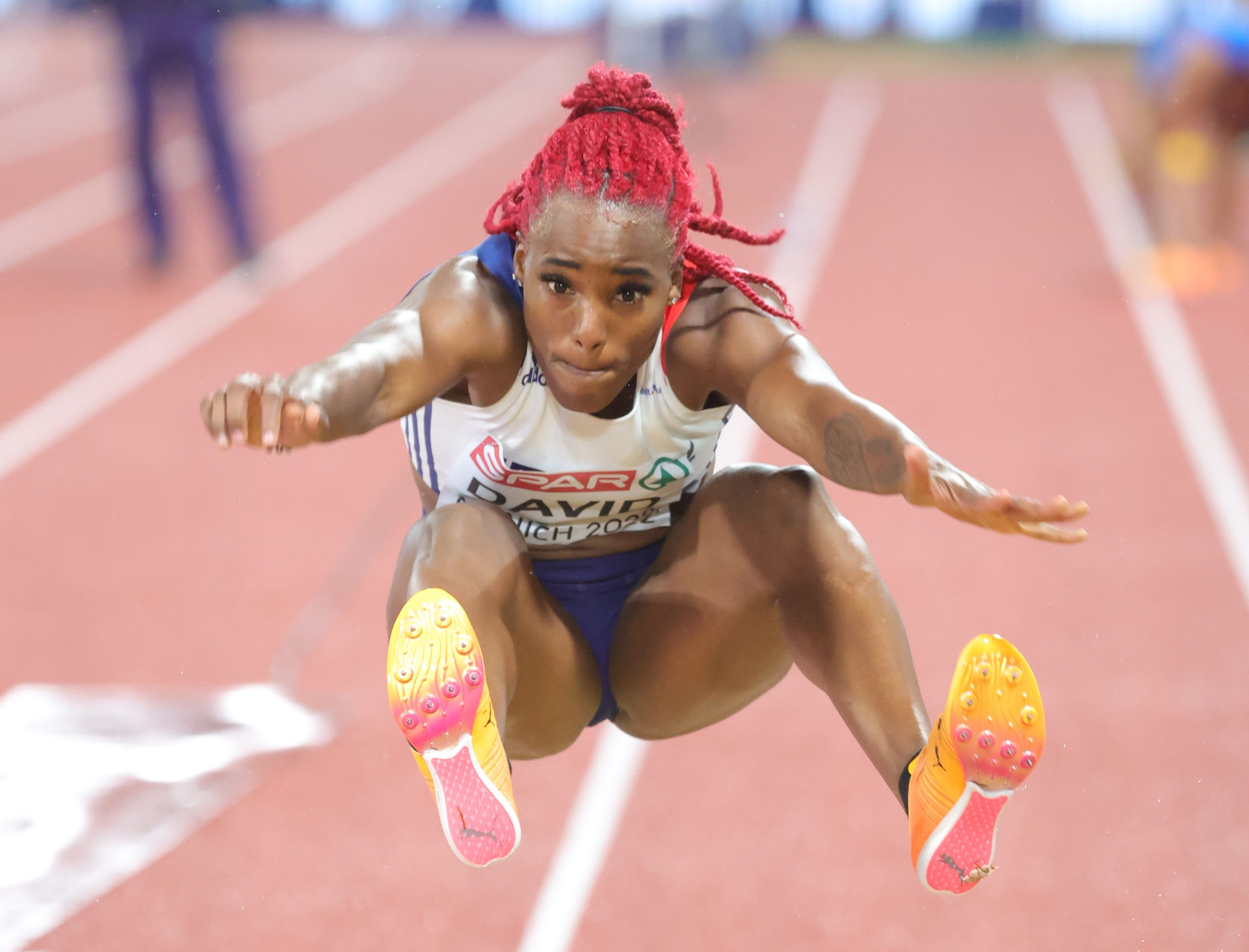
- David in 2022

Personal information
- Full name: Yanis Esmerelda David
- Nationality: French
- Born: 12 December 1997 (age 28) Les Abymes, Guadeloupe
- Height: 169 cm (5 ft 7 in)
- Weight: 66 kg (146 lb)

Sport
- Country: France
- Sport: Athletics
- Events: Triple jump, Long jump
- Club: Monster Club Athlé; CA Montreuil 93
- Coached by: Nic Petersen (2016–); Jorice Bassola (2023–)
Medal record
Women's athletics
Representing France
Mediterranean Games
| Gold medal – first place | 2018 Tarragona | Triple jump |
European U23 Championships
| Gold medal – first place | 2017 Bydgoszcz | Long jump |

Yanis Esmerelda David (born 12 December 1997) is a French athlete. Yanis is a specialist in the women's triple jump, representing France and its overseas department of Guadeloupe in international competition.

== Life ==
David was born in 1997 in Les Abymes. She attended the Cite Scolaire d'Excellence Sportive in Abymes, Guadeloupe and enrolled in 2015 at the University of Florida.

David won gold in the triple jump event at the Youth Olympic Games of 2014 at Nanjing, China. She qualified for the 2015 European Junior Championships long jump qualifying round, but did not start.

With a mark of 6.48 m Yanis reset the 27-year-old CARIFTA record for the women's Long Jump at the 2016 edition of the Games in St George's, Grenada.

At the IAAF World U20 Championships Bydgoszcz 2016, Yanis won the gold medal in the long jump event, clearing 6.42m.

== College ==
While at Florida, she won the Honda Sports Award as the nation's best female track and field competitor in 2019.

== Personal Bests ==
Personal Bests
| Event | | Mark | Place | Date |
|---|---|---|---|---|
| Long Jump | Outdoor | 6.67m | Knoxville | 12 May 2018 |
| Long Jump | Indoor | 6.49m | College Station | 24 February 2018 |
| Triple Jump | Outdoor | 14.15m | Tarragona | 29 June 2018 |
| Triple Jump | Indoor | 14.11m | College Station | 25 February 2018 |
