= Dovilė Kilty =

Lithuanian athletics competitor

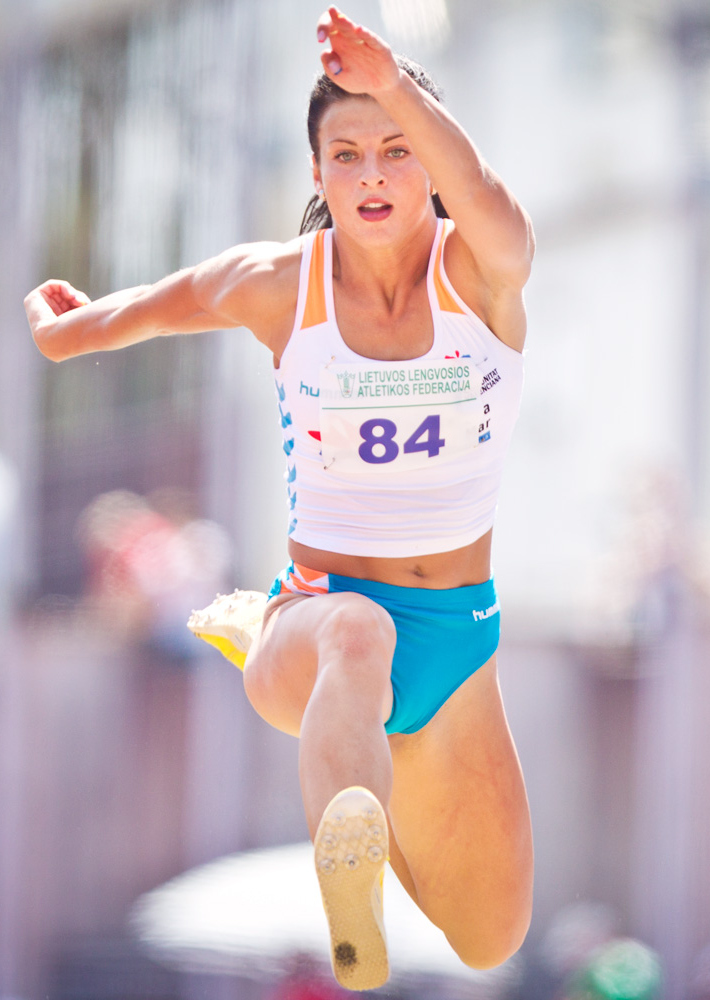
- Kilty at the 2014 Lithuanian Championships in Athletics

Personal information
- Born: 14 July 1993 (age 33) Šiauliai, Lithuania

Sport
- Country: Lithuania
- Sport: Athletics
Medal record
Representing Lithuania
Women's athletics
World Junior Championships
Silver medal – second place	2012 Barcelona	Triple jump
- Updated on 21 July 2016

Dovilė Kilty (née Dzindzaletaitė; born 14 July 1993) is a Lithuanian track and field athlete who competes primarily as a triple jumper. She has competed at multiple major championships, including the 2024 Olympic Games. She finished in fourth place at the 2025 European Athletics Indoor Championships and was a silver medalist at the 2012 World Junior Championships.

== Career ==
She represented Lithuania in the 2010 Summer Youth Olympics in Singapore. She won the silver medal at the 2012 World Athletics Junior Championships in Barcelona, Spain. In 2015 she won the gold medal at the European Athletics U23 Championships in Tampere, Finland. She went on to represent her country in Beijing at the 2015 World Athletics Championships and in London, England, at the 2017 World Athletics Championships.

At the 2023 European Athletics Indoor Championships in Istanbul, she finished in sixth place in the final of the triple jump with a best jump of 13.92 metres.

She competed in the triple jump at the 2024 Paris Olympics, jumping 13.65 metres but did not qualify for the final.

She was selected for the 2025 European Athletics Indoor Championships in Appeldoorn, finishing fourth in the final with a best jump of 13.80 metres. In September 2025, she competed at the 2025 World Championships in Tokyo, Japan, jumping 13.86 metres.

In August 2026, she competed at the 2026 European Athletics Championships in Birmingham, England.

== Personal life ==
Kilty was born in Šiauliai, as Dovilė Dzindzaletaitė. She has been married to British sprinter Richard Kilty since 2017, whom she met in London during the IAAF Diamond League meeting. Together they have a son, Richard Jr. Due to her pregnancy, Kilty had to miss the 2016 Olympic Games in Rio de Janeiro.

== International competitions ==
Year	Competition	Venue	Position	Event	Notes
2010	Youth Olympic Games	Bishan, Singapore	9th	Triple jump	12.40 m
2012	World Junior Championships	Barcelona, Spain	2nd	Triple jump	14.17 m NR
2013	European Indoor Championships	Gothenburg, Sweden	14th	Triple jump	13.52 m
2013	European U23 Championships	Tampere, Finland	9th	Triple jump	13.11 m (0.0 m/s)
2015	European U23 Championships	Tallinn, Estonia	1st	Triple jump	14.23 m (+1.9 m/s)
2015	World Championships	Beijing, China	19th (q)	Triple jump	13.58 m
2017	World Championships	London, United Kingdom	15th (q)	Triple jump	13.97 m
2018	World Indoor Championships	Birmingham, United Kingdom	12th	Triple jump	13.90 m
2019	World Championships	Doha, Qatar	14th (q)	Triple jump	14.09 m
2022	European Championships	Munich, Germany	12th	Triple jump	13.27 m
2023	European Indoor Championships	Istanbul, Turkey	6th	Triple jump	13.92 m
2023	World Championships	Budapest, Hungary	20th (q)	Triple jump	13.87 m
2024	World Indoor Championships	Glasgow, United Kingdom	13th	Triple jump	13.46 m
2024	European Championships	Rome, Italy	17th (q)	Triple jump	13.69 m
2024	Olympic Games	Paris, France	25th (q)	Triple jump	13.64 m
2025	European Indoor Championships	Apeldoorn, Netherlands	4th	Triple jump	13.80 m
2025	World Championships	Tokyo, Japan	13th (q)	Triple jump	13.86 m
2026	European Championships	Birmingham, United Kingdom	20th (q)	Triple jump	13.56 m

== National competitions ==
Year	Competition	Venue	Position	Event	Notes
2010	Lithuanian Championships	Kaunas, Lithuania	3rd	Triple jump	12.80 m
2011	Lithuanian Athletics Federation Cup	Kaunas, Lithuania	1st	Triple jump	13.35 m
2012	Lithuanian Indoor Championships	Kaunas, Lithuania	1st	Triple jump	13.60 m
2013	Lithuanian Indoor Championships	Šiauliai, Lithuania	1st	Triple jump	13.40 m
2013	Lithuanian Athletics Federation Cup	Kaunas, Lithuania	1st	Triple jump	13.72 m
2013	Lithuanian Championships	Šiauliai, Lithuania	1st	Triple jump	13.52 m
