= Olha Korsun =

Ukrainian athlete

Personal information
- Nationality: Ukrainian
- Born: 11 November 1996 (age 29)

Sport
- Sport: Athletics
- Event: Triple jump

Achievements and titles
- Personal bests: Triple jump: 14.20m (Lutsk, 2024)
Medal record
Representing Ukraine
Women's Triple jump
Universiade
| Gold medal – first place | 2019 Naples | Triple jump |

Olha Korsun (born 11 November 1996) is a Ukrainian triple jumper. In 2024, she became Ukrainian national champion.

== Career ==
She won the gold medal at the Athletics at the 2019 Summer Universiade in the women's triple jump.

In July 2023, she jumped a wind-assisted 14.03 metres in Oslo.

In May 2024, she became Ukrainian national champion in the triple jump. She competed in the triple jump at the 2024 Paris Olympics.

In September 2025, she competed at the 2025 World Championships in Tokyo, Japan, without advancing to the final.
