= Dariya Derkach =

Ukrainian-Italian athletics competitor (born 1993)

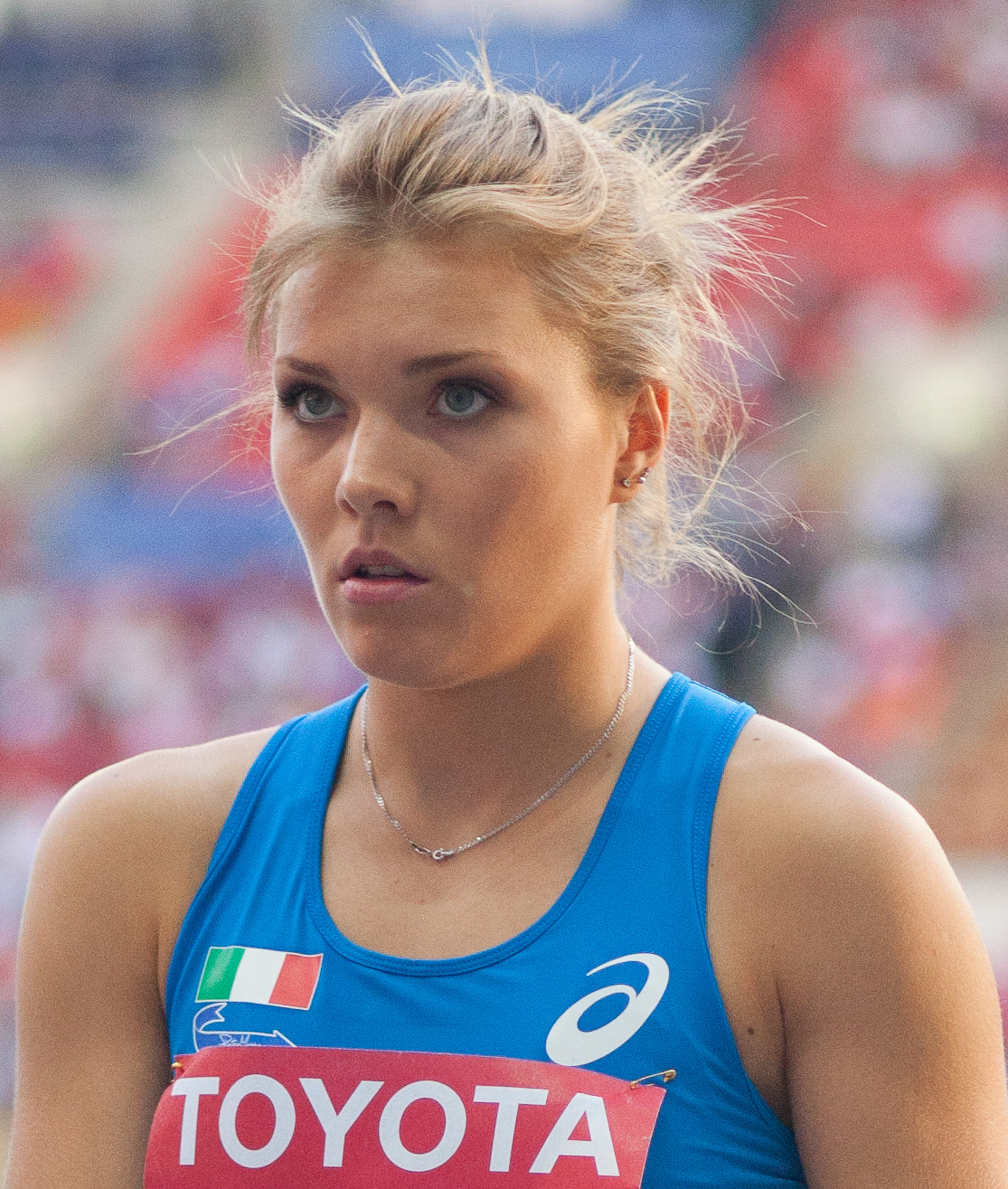
- Derkach at the 2013 World Championships

Personal information
- National team: Italy
- Born: 27 March 1993 (age 33) Vinnytsia, Ukraine
- Height: 1.70 m (5 ft 7 in)
- Weight: 50 kg (110 lb)

Sport
- Sport: Athletics
- Event: Triple jump
- Club: C.S. Aeronautica Militare
- Coached by: Serhiy Derkach

Achievements and titles
- Personal bests: Long jump: 6.67 m (2013); Triple jump: 14.60 m (2026)
Medal record
Women's athletics
Representing Italy
European Championships
Gold medal – first place	2026 Birmingham	Triple jump
European Indoor Championships
Silver medal – second place	2023 Istanbul	Triple jump
European U23 Championships
Silver medal – second place	2013 Tampere	Triple jump

Dariya Derkach (Ukrainian: Дар'я Деркач; born 27 March 1993) is a Ukrainian-Italian triple jumper. She won the women's triple jump gold medal at the 2026 European Championships and also competed at the 2020 and 2024 Summer Olympics.

== Personal life ==
Derkach was born in Ukraine but has been an Italian citizen since 27 May 2013. She has lived in the town of Pagani, in the Province of Salerno, in Italy with her parents since 2002. Her father, Serhiy (a former decathlete), is her coach. She trains in Formia where she has lived since the end of 2014. Her mother, Oksana Derkach, was a triple jumper.

== Career ==
Derkach competed at the 2020 and 2024 Summer Olympics.

She won the silver medal at the 2023 European Indoor Championships in Istanbul, Türkiye.

Derkach jumped a personal best of 14.60 metres to win the gold medal in the triple jump at the 2026 European Championships in Birmingham, England.

== National records ==
- Long jump (junior): 6.67 m ( (Italy) Rieti, 15 June 2013) - current holder

== Achievements ==
Year	Competition	Venue	Position	Event	Measure	Notes
2011	European Champion Clubs Cup jr.	(Spain) Castellon	1st	100 m hs	13.83	
2011	European Champion Clubs Cup jr.	(Spain) Castellon	1st	Long jump	6.21 m	
2011	European Champion Clubs Cup jr.	(Spain) Castellon	1st	4x100 m relay	47.37	
2013	European Team Championships	(United Kingdom) Gateshead	6th	Long jump	6.21 m	
2013	European U23 Championships	(Finland) Tampere	6th	Long jump	6.45 m	(w: +1.0 m/s)
2013	European U23 Championships	(Finland) Tampere	2nd	Triple jump	13.56 m	(w: +1.5 m/s)
2013	World Championships	(Russia) Moscow	28th Qual.	Long jump	6.16 m	
2014	Mediterranean U23 Championships	(France) Aubagne	3rd	Long jump	6.09 m	
2014	Mediterranean U23 Championships	(France) Aubagne	2nd	Triple jump	13.81 m	
2014	European Championships	(Switzerland) Zürich	21st Qual.	Triple jump	13.06 m	
2015	European Indoor Championships	(Czech Republic) Prague	21st Qual.	Triple jump	13.40 m	
2015	European U23 Championships	(Estonia) Tallinn	20th Qual.	Long jump	6.00 m	(w: 1.0 m/s)
2015	European U23 Championships	(Estonia) Tallinn	4th	Triple jump	13.88 m	(w: +2.6 m/s)
2016	European Championships	(Netherlands) Amsterdam	10th	Triple jump	13.89 m	
2016	Olympic Games	(Brazil) Rio de Janeiro	28th Qual.	Triple jump	13.56 m	
2017	European Indoor Championships	(Serbia) Belgrade	13th Qual.	Triple jump	13.69 m	
2018	Mediterranean Games	(Spain) Tarragona	8th	Triple jump	13.39 m	
2018	European Championships	(Germany) Berlin	NC Qual.	Triple jump	NM	
2023	European Indoor Championships	(Turkey) Istanbul	2nd	Triple jump	14.20 m	

== National titles ==
Dariya Derkach has won 13 times the individual senior national championship and 7 at junior level. She won her first senior national championship in 2014.

Senior (13)

- Italian Athletics Championships
  - Triple jump: 2014, 2016, 2017, 2020, 2021, 2022 (6)
- Italian Athletics Indoor Championships
  - Long jump: 2014 (1)
  - Triple jump: 2015, 2017, 2020, 2021, 2022, 2023 (6)

Junior (7)

- 4 wins in long jump (2010, 2011, 2012, 2013)
- 3 wins in triple jump (2011, 2012, 2013)

== See also ==
- Italian all-time top lists - Long jump
- Italian all-time lists - Triple jump
