= Maryna Bekh-Romanchuk =

Ukrainian long jumper (born 1995)

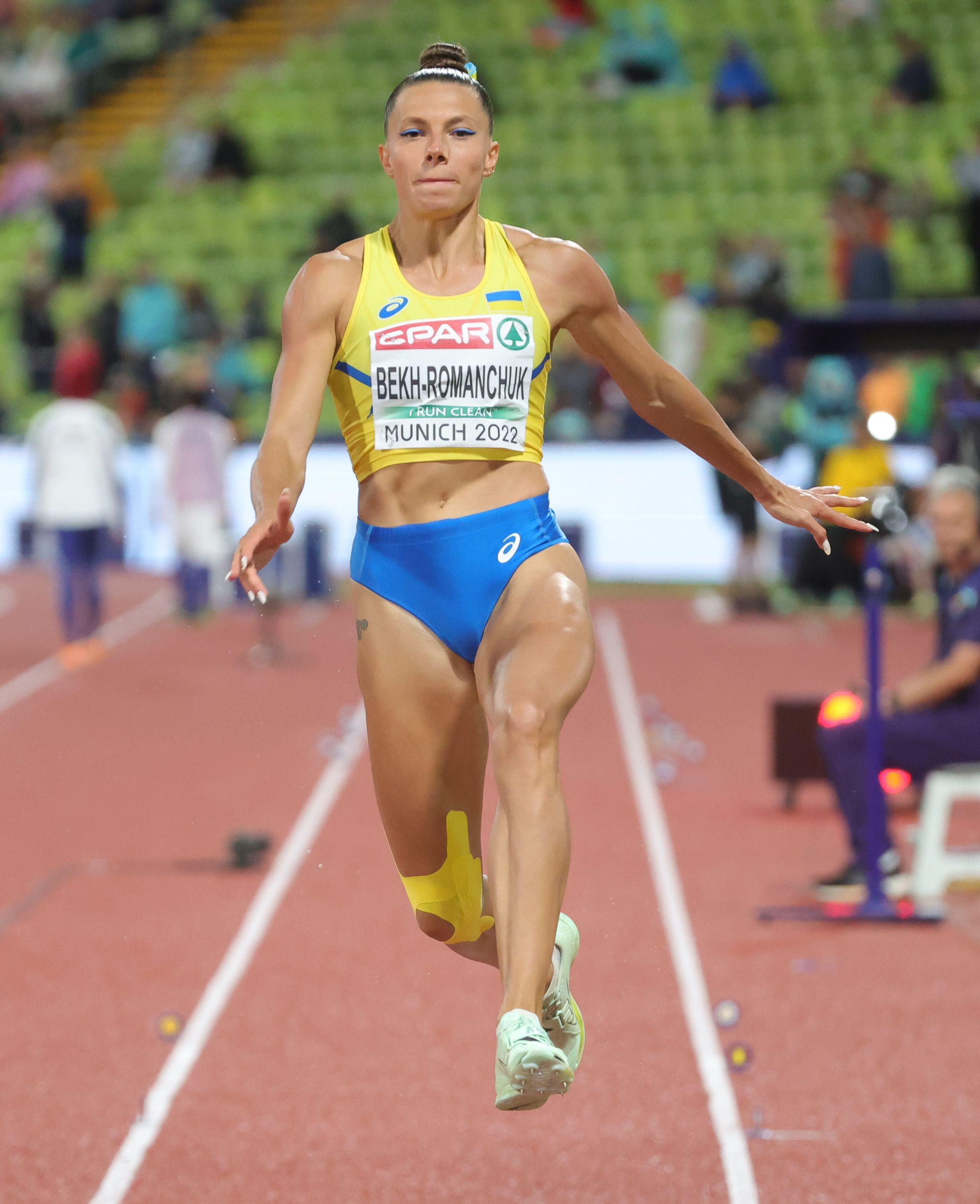
- Maryna Bekh at the 2022 European Championships

Personal information
- Nationality: Ukrainian
- Born: 18 July 1995 (age 31) Moroziv, Khmelnytskyi Oblast, Ukraine
- Height: 1.74 m (5 ft 9 in)
- Weight: 62 kg (137 lb)

Sport
- Country: Ukraine
- Sport: Athletics
- Events: Long jump, triple jump

Achievements and titles
- Personal bests: Long jump: 6.93m (Lutsk (2016); Triple jump: 15.02m (Munich 2022)
Medal record
Women's athletics
Representing Ukraine
World Championships
| Silver medal – second place | 2019 Doha | Long jump |
| Silver medal – second place | 2023 Budapest | Triple jump |
World Indoor Championships
| Silver medal – second place | 2022 Belgrade | Triple jump |
Diamond League
| Third place | 2021 | Long jump |
| Second place | 2022 | Triple jump |
European Games
| Gold medal – first place | 2019 Minsk | Team event |
| Gold medal – first place | 2023 Kraków-Małopolska | Triple jump |
| Bronze medal – third place | 2019 Minsk | Long jump |
European Championships
| Gold medal – first place | 2022 Munich | Triple jump |
| Silver medal – second place | 2018 Berlin | Long jump |
European Indoor Championships
| Gold medal – first place | 2021 Toruń | Long jump |
| Bronze medal – third place | 2019 Glasgow | Long jump |
World Athletics Indoor Tour
| First place | 2020 | Long jump |
European Team Championships
| Bronze medal – third place | 2017 Lille | Long jump |
European Athletics U23 Championships
| Bronze medal – third place | 2017 Bydgoszcz | Long jump |
European Athletics U20 Championships
| Bronze medal – third place | 2013 Rieti | Long jump |
European Youth Olympic Festival
| Gold medal – first place | 2011 Trabzon | Long jump |

Maryna Oleksandrivna Bekh-Romanchuk (Ukrainian: Мари́на Олександрівна Бех Романчу́к; born 18 July 1995) is a Ukrainian long jumper and triple jumper. She won the silver medal at the 2019 World Championships in the long jump and the silver medal at the 2023 World Championships in the triple jump.

Bekh-Romanchuk is currently serving a four-year ban set to expire in May 2029 for an anti-doping rule violation.

== Career ==
She finished fifth at the 2011 World Youth Championships, eighth at the 2012 World Junior Championships, won the bronze medal at the 2013 European Junior Championships and finished ninth at the 2014 World Junior Championships, and fifth at the 2020 Olympic Games in Tokyo. She competed at the 2013 World Championships without reaching the final.

Her personal best jump is 6.93 metres, achieved in Lutsk in 2016.

In August 2025, Bekh-Romanchuk was issued with a four-year ban by the Athletics Integrity Unit backdated to May 2025 for an anti-doping rule violation after testing positive for metabolites of testosterone at an out-of-competition test in December 2024.

== Competition record ==
Representing Ukraine
| Year | Competition | Venue | Position | Event | Result |
|---|---|---|---|---|---|
| 2012 | World Junior Championships | Barcelona, Spain | 8th | Long jump | 6.35 m |
| 2016 | European Championships | Amsterdam, Netherlands | 12th | Long jump | 6.29 m |
| 2016 | Olympic Games | Rio de Janeiro, Brazil | NM (10th q) | Long jump | NM (6.55 m q) |
| 2017 | European Indoor Championships | Belgrade, Serbia | 7th | Long jump | 6.59 m |
| 2017 | World Championships | London, United Kingdom | 18th (q) | Long jump | 6.36 m |
| 2018 | World Indoor Championships | Birmingham, United Kingdom | 10th | Long jump | 6.37 m |
| 2018 | European Championships | Berlin, Germany | 2nd | Long jump | 6.73 m |
| 2019 | European Indoor Championships | Glasgow, United Kingdom | 3rd | Long jump | 6.84 m |
| 2019 | Universiade | Naples, Italy | 1st | Long jump | 6.84 m |
| 2019 | World Championships | Doha, Qatar | 2nd | Long jump | 6.92 m |
| 2021 | European Indoor Championships | Toruń, Poland | 1st | Long jump | 6.92 m |
| 2021 | Olympic Games | Tokyo, Japan | 5th | Long jump | 6.88 m |
| 2022 | World Indoor Championships | Belgrade, Serbia | 6th | Long jump | 6.73 m |
| 2022 | World Indoor Championships | Belgrade, Serbia | 2nd | Triple jump | 14.76 m |
| 2022 | World Championships | Eugene, United States | 8th | Long jump | 6.82 m |
| 2022 | World Championships | Eugene, United States | 11th | Triple jump | 13.91 m |
| 2022 | European Championships | Munich, Germany | 4th | Long jump | 6.76 m |
| 2022 | European Championships | Munich, Germany | 1st | Triple jump | 15.02 m |
| 2023 | European Games | Chorzów, Poland | 1st | Triple jump | 14.58 m |
| 2023 | World Championships | Budapest, Hungary | – | Long jump | NM |
| 2023 | World Championships | Budapest, Hungary | 2nd | Triple jump | 15.00 m |
| 2024 | Olympic Games | Paris, France | 11th | Triple jump | 13.98 m |

== Personal life ==
In September 2018, she married Ukrainian Swimmer Mykhailo Romanchuk.
