= Yekaterina Sariyeva =

Azerbaijani athlete

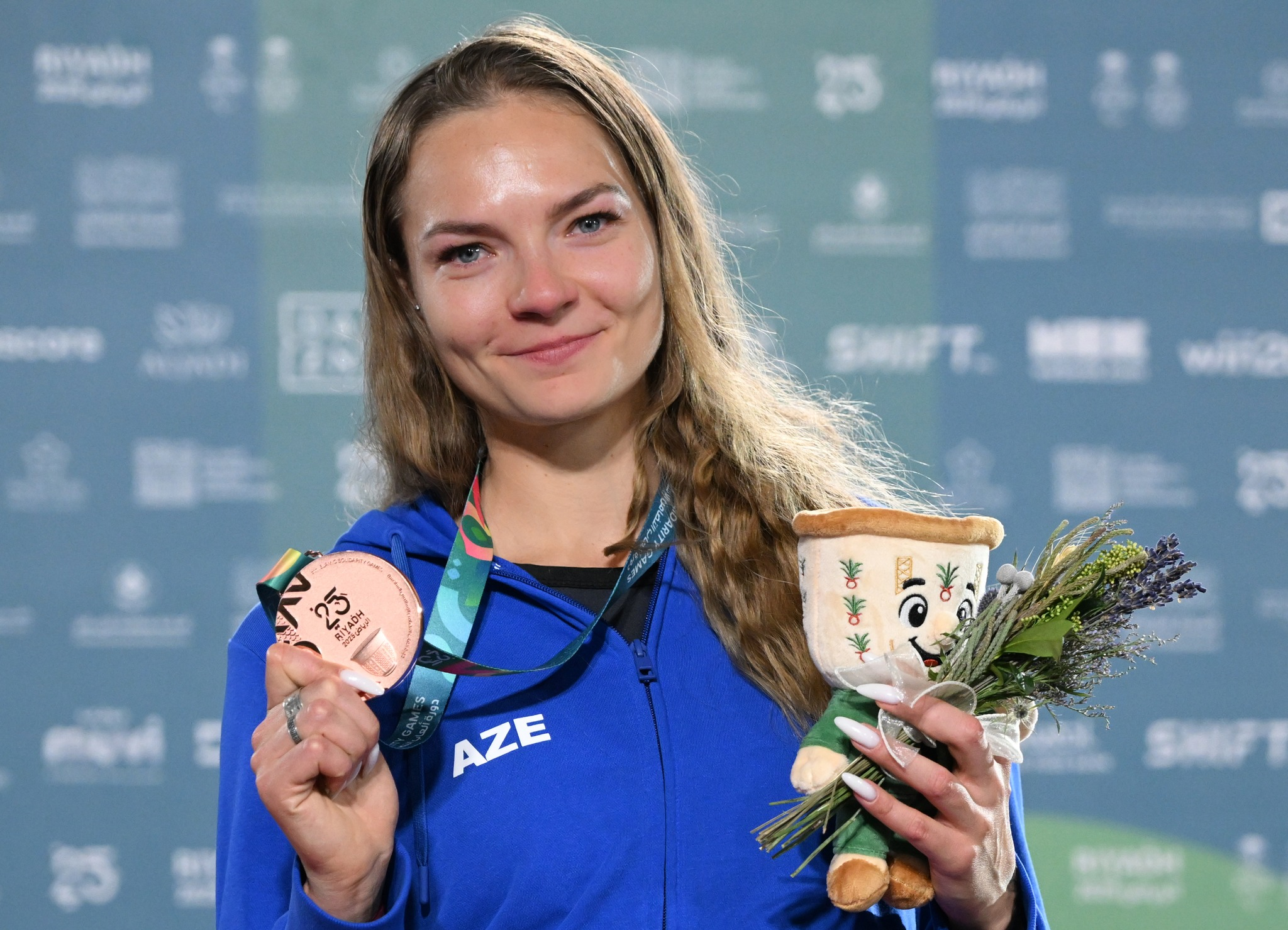
- Yekaterina Sariyeva in 2025

Personal information
- Nationality: Azerbaijan
- Born: 18 December 1995 (age 30) Baku, Azarbaijan

Sport
- Sport: Athletics
- Event: Triple Jump

Achievements and titles
- Personal bests: Triple Jump 13.91 (Birmingham, 2026) NR
Medal record
Women's athletics
Representing Azerbaijan
Islamic Solidarity Games
Gold medal – first place	2013 Palembang	Triple jump
Silver medal – second place	2021 Konya	Triple jump
Bronze medal – third place	2025 Riyadh	Triple jump

Yekaterina Sariyeva (born 18 December 1995) is a track and field athlete from Azerbaijan. A multiple-time national champion, she is the national record holder in the triple jump.

== Biography ==
Sariyeva was selected to compete at the 2023 European Athletics Indoor Championships – Women's triple jump. In June 2023, she won the triple jump at the European Team Championships third division competition in Chorzów, Silesia with a jump of 13.38m. The following month, Sariyeva won at the Gosanov Memorial competition held in Almaty, Kazakhstan. Her jump of 13.89m was a new personal best and new Azerbaijani national record. In July 2023, she also won the Charlottenburger Mittsommernacht competition in Berlin, part of the World Athletics Continental Tour, with a jump of 13.33m.

She competed at the 2024 European Athletics Championships in Rome in June 2024.

In August 2026, she competed at the 2026 European Athletics Championships in Birmingham, England, jumping a new national record of 13.91 metres.
