= Ottavia Cestonaro =

Italian athletics competitor

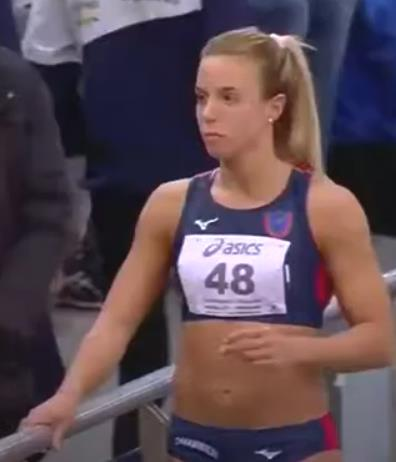
- Cestonaro at the 2018 Italian Athletics Indoor Championships

Personal information
- Born: 12 January 1995 (age 31) Vicenza, Italy
- Height: 1.76 m (5 ft 9 in)
- Weight: 66 kg (146 lb)

Sport
- Country: Italy
- Sport: Athletics
- Event(s): Triple jump Long jump
- Club: C.S. Carabinieri
- Coached by: Sergio Cestonaro

Achievements and titles
- Personal bests: Triple outdoor: 14.22 m (2022); Triple indoor: 14.11 m (2023); Long outdoor: 6.46 m (2022); Long indoor: 6.34 m (2017)
Medal record
Women's athletics
Representing Italy
European Games
Bronze medal – third place	2023 Kraków-Małopolska	Triple jump
Mediterranean Games
Silver medal – second place	2018 Tarragona	Triple jump
World Military Games
Silver medal – second place	2019 Wuhan	Triple jump
European Junior Championships
Gold medal – first place	2013 Rieti	Triple jump

Ottavia Cestonaro (born 12 January 1995) is an Italian long jumper and triple jumper.

== Career ==
She has won five times her country's senior national championship, and ranked in the top 60, at 33rd place, on the IAAF world leading list at the end of the 2017 indoor season. She also won an individual gold medal at junior level at the 2013 European Athletics Junior Championships held in Rieti.

== Personal life ==
She is currently engaged to the rugby union player Marco Zanon.

== Progression ==
Personal Best

Triple jump outdoor

Year (age)	Performance	Venue	Date	World Ranking
2022 (27)	14.22	(Spain) Madrid	18 June	
2021 (26)	14.09	(Italy) Rovereto	27 June	
2020 (25)	13.62	(Italy) Vicenza	7 August	
2019 (24)	14.18	(Poland) Bydgoszcz	10 August	28th
2018 (23)	14.05	(Spain) Tarragona	29 June	25th
2017 (22)	13.66	(Italy) Trieste	2 July	50th
2016 (21)	13.18	(Italy) Cinisello Balsamo	24 September	
2015 (20)	13.76	(Italy) Turin	26 July	64th
2014 (19)	13.64	(France) Aubagne	14 June	95th
2013 (18)	13.69	(Italy) Rieti	15 June	88th

Triple jump indoor

Year (age)	Performance	Venue	Date	World Ranking
2023 (28)	14.11	(Italy) Ancona	19 February	12th
2019 (24)	13.56	(Italy) Ancona	17 February	46th
2018 (23)	13.47	(Italy) Padua	21 January	47th
2017 (22)	13.57	(Italy) Ancona	19 February	33rd
2013 (18)	13.47	(Italy) Ancona	17 February	60th

== Achievements ==
Year	Competition	Venue	Position	Event	Measure	Notes
2012	World Junior Championships	(Spain) Barcelona	8th	Triple jump	13.29 m	
2013	European Junior Championships	(Italy) Rieti	1st	Triple jump	13.41 m	
2014	Mediterranean U23 Championships	(France) Aubagne	3rd	Triple jump	13.64 m	
2014	World Junior Championships	(United States) Eugene	11th	Triple jump	13.03 m	
2015	European Junior Championships	(Estonia) Tallinn	7th	Triple jump	13.34 m	SB
2016	Mediterranean U23 Championships	(Tunisia) Tunis	3rd	Long jump	6.08 m	
2016	Mediterranean U23 Championships	(Tunisia) Tunis	2nd	Triple jump	12.99 m	
2017	European U23 Championships	(Poland) Bydgoszcz	6th	Triple jump	13.54 m	
2017	Universiade	(Taiwan) Taipei	4th	Triple jump	13.51 m	
2018	Mediterranean Games	(Spain) Tarragona	2nd	Triple jump	14.05 m	PB
2019	Universiade	(Italy) Naples	9th	Triple jump	13.32 m	
2019	European Team Championships	(Poland) Bydgoszcz	3rd	Triple jump	14.18 m	PB
2019	World Championships	(Qatar) Doha	17th	Triple jump	13.97 m	
2019	Military World Games	(China) Wuhan	2nd	Triple jump	13.78 m	
2021	European Indoor Championships	(Poland) Toruń	9th	Long jump	13.90 m	PB
2023	European Indoor Championships	(Turkey) Istanbul	4th	Triple jump	14.08 m	

== National titles ==
She has won 8 times the individual national championship.

- Italian Athletics Championships
  - Long jump (2023)
  - Triple jump (2015, 2018, 2019, 2023)
- Italian Athletics Indoor Championships
  - Triple jump (2018)
  - Pentathlon (2016, 2017)

== See also ==
- Italian all-time lists - Triple jump
