= Athletics at the 2016 Summer Olympics – Women's triple jump =

Women's triple jump at the Games of the XXXI Olympiad
- Venue: Olympic Stadium
- Dates: 13 August 2016 (qualification); 14 August 2016 (final)
- Competitors: 37 from 25 nations
- Winning distance: 15.17 m

Medalists
1st place, gold medalist(s)		Caterine Ibargüen	Colombia
2nd place, silver medalist(s)		Yulimar Rojas	Venezuela
3rd place, bronze medalist(s)		Olga Rypakova	Kazakhstan

Official Video Highlights

The Women's triple jump competition at the 2016 Summer Olympics in Rio de Janeiro, Brazil. The event was held at the Olympic Stadium on 13–14 August.

== Summary ==
Before the competition, 2015 World Champion Caterine Ibargüen of Colombia had the longest jump of the season with 15.04 m. Kazakhstan's Olga Rypakova entered as the defending Olympic champion from 2012 and had been the first athlete to beat Ibargüen that year, ending her rival's 34-meet-long winning streak. Twenty-year-old Venezuelan Yulimar Rojas was the only other athlete over fifteen metres that season and had won the 2016 World Indoor Championships. The remaining top challengers formed the 2016 European Championships podium – Patrícia Mamona of Portugal, Greek jumper Paraskeví Papahrístou (third on the world rankings), and 2015 world medallist Hanna Knyazyeva-Minenko of Israel.

Ibargüen topped qualifying with her sole jump of 14.52 m. Papahrístou and Rypakova were the only other automatic qualifiers, both requiring two attempts. It took 14.08 m to make the final. All the main contenders progressed with Germany's Kristin Gierisch and Finn Kristiina Mäkelä posting the next best marks. A 2012 Olympic medallist and former world champion, Olha Saladuha of Ukraine, failed to progress.

In the final, on the third jump of the competition, Keturah Orji took the lead with an American record 14.71 m (48 ft 3 in). Four jumps later, defending champion Olga Rypakova edged ahead with 14.73 m. The final jumper in every round of the competition, Caterine Ibargüen moved into bronze medal position with 14.65 m. In the second round, Ibargüen took the lead she would never relinquish, with a 15.03 m. In the third round Yulimar Rojas jumped 14.87 m to take over the silver medal position she would not relinquish. Rojas jumped her best in the fourth round, 14.98 m (49 ft 1 3/4 in) and Ibargüen followed that with her best of 15.17 m (49 ft 9 in). In the fifth round, Rypakova jumped her best of 14.74 m but the tiny improvement was not enough to improve the color of her medal.

== Competition format ==
The competition consisted of two rounds, qualification and final. In qualification, each athlete jumped three times (stopping early if they made the qualifying distance). At least the top twelve athletes moved on to the final; if more than twelve reached the qualifying distance, all who did so advanced. Distances were reset for the final round. Finalists jumped three times, after which the eight best jumped three more times (with the best distance of the six jumps counted).

== Schedule ==
All times are Brasília Time (UTC−3)

Date	Time	Round
Saturday, 13 August 2016	09:40	Qualifications
Sunday, 14 August 2016	20:55	Finals

== Records ==
Prior to the competition, the existing world record, Olympic record, and world leading jump were as follows:

World record	Inessa Kravets (UKR)	15.50 m	Gothenburg, Sweden	10 August 1995
Olympic record	Françoise Mbango Etone (CMR)	15.39 m	Beijing, China	17 August 2008
World Leading	Caterine Ibargüen (COL)	15.04 m	Doha, Qatar	6 May 2016

The following national records were established during the competition:

Country	Athlete	Round	Distance	Notes
United States	Keturah Orji (USA)	Final	14.71 m	
Portugal	Patrícia Mamona (POR)	Final	14.65 m	

== Results ==
=== Qualifying round ===
Progression rules: Qualifying performance 14.30 (Q) or at least 12 best performers (q) advance to the Final

Rank	Group	Name	Nationality	#1	#2	#3	Result	Notes
1	B	Caterine Ibargüen	Colombia	14.52	—	—	14.52	Q
2	A	Paraskevi Papachristou	Greece	13.83	14.43	—	14.43	Q
3	B	Olga Rypakova	Kazakhstan	14.10	14.39	—	14.39	Q
4	B	Kristin Gierisch	Germany	13.97	13.81	14.26	14.26	q
5	A	Kristiina Mäkelä	Finland	13.73	14.01	14.24	14.24	q, PB
6	B	Kimberly Williams	Jamaica	14.19	14.03	14.22	14.22	q
7	A	Yulimar Rojas	Venezuela	14.21	13.79	12.89	14.21	q
8	A	Hanna Knyazyeva-Minenko	Israel	x	x	14.20	14.20	q
9	B	Patrícia Mamona	Portugal	13.80	14.07	14.18	14.18	q
10	B	Anna Jagaciak-Michalska	Poland	14.04	14.13	x	14.13	q
11	A	Susana Costa	Portugal	13.70	13.72	14.12	14.12	q
12	B	Keturah Orji	United States	x	14.08	x	14.08	q
13	A	Jenny Elbe	Germany	14.00	13.85	14.02	14.02	
14	A	Shanieka Thomas	Jamaica	13.95	13.95	14.02	14.02	
15	B	Christina Epps	United States	14.01	x	x	14.01	
16	A	Elena Panțuroiu	Romania	14.00	x	13.68	14.00	
17	B	Dana Velďáková	Slovakia	13.74	13.98	x	13.98	
18	B	Olha Saladuha	Ukraine	13.77	13.97	13.61	13.97	
19	A	Jeanine Assani Issouf	France	13.51	x	13.97	13.97	
20	A	Yosiris Urrutia	Colombia	13.67	13.95	x	13.95	
21	A	Andrea Geubelle	United States	13.67	x	13.93	13.93	
22	B	Gabriela Petrova	Bulgaria	x	13.50	13.92	13.92	
23	B	Núbia Soares	Brazil	x	13.81	13.85	13.85	
24	A	Keila Costa	Brazil	x	13.62	13.78	13.78	
25	A	Liadagmis Povea	Cuba	13.60	13.63	13.55	13.63	
26	A	Ruslana Tsykhotska	Ukraine	13.16	13.19	13.63	13.63	
27	B	Ana José Tima	Dominican Republic	13.61	13.59	13.28	13.61	
28	B	Dariya Derkach	Italy	13.19	13.55	13.56	13.56	
29	B	Yekaterina Ektova	Kazakhstan	13.38	13.31	13.51	13.51	
30	B	Cristina Bujin	Romania	x	x	13.38	13.38	
31	B	Iryna Vaskouskaya	Belarus	12.85	13.35	13.23	13.35	
32	A	Patricia Sarrapio	Spain	13.35	x	x	13.35	
33	A	Irina Ektova	Kazakhstan	x	13.17	13.33	13.33	
34	B	Li Xiaohong	China	13.30	x	13.25	13.30	SB
35	A	Natallia Viatkina	Belarus	x	13.14	13.25	13.25	
36	B	Joëlle Mbumi Nkouindjin	Cameroon	13.11	12.33	12.58	13.11	
37	A	Thea LaFond	Dominica	12.82	x	x	12.82	

=== Final ===
Rank	Name	Nationality	#1	#2	#3	#4	#5	#6	Result	Notes
1st place, gold medalist(s)	Caterine Ibargüen	Colombia	14.65	15.03	14.38	15.17	14.76	14.80	15.17	SB
2nd place, silver medalist(s)	Yulimar Rojas	Venezuela	14.32	x	14.87	14.98	14.66	14.95	14.98	
3rd place, bronze medalist(s)	Olga Rypakova	Kazakhstan	14.73	14.49	14.52	14.20	14.74	14.58	14.74	SB
4	Keturah Orji	United States	14.71	x	x	14.50	14.40	14.39	14.71	NR
5	Hanna Knyazyeva-Minenko	Israel	14.25	14.39	14.32	14.68	x	14.33	14.68	SB
6	Patrícia Mamona	Portugal	14.39	14.14	14.45	14.42	14.65	14.59	14.65	NR
7	Kimberly Williams	Jamaica	14.33	14.48	x	14.38	x	14.53	14.53	
8	Paraskevi Papachristou	Greece	14.26	14.19	x	14.04	13.99	13.81	14.26	
9	Susana Costa	Portugal	x	x	14.12	Did not advance			14.12	
10	Anna Jagaciak-Michalska	Poland	14.07	x	13.84	Did not advance			14.07	
11	Kristin Gierisch	Germany	13.65	13.96	x	Did not advance			13.96	
12	Kristiina Mäkelä	Finland	x	13.95	13.70	Did not advance			13.95	
