= 2018 European Athletics Championships – Women's triple jump =

Women's Athletes Champion Ship Held In Olympic Stadium

Women's triple jump at the 2018 European Athletics Championships
- Venue: Olympic Stadium
- Location: Berlin
- Dates: August 8 (qualification); August 10 (final)
- Competitors: 29 from 17 nations
- Winning result: 14.60

Medalists
gold medal	Paraskevi Papachristou	Greece
silver medal	Kristin Gierisch	Germany
bronze medal	Ana Peleteiro	Spain

The women's triple jump at the 2018 European Athletics Championships took place at the Olympic Stadium on 8 and 10 August.

== Records ==
Standing records prior to the 2018 European Athletics Championships
World record	Inessa Kravets (UKR)	15.50 m	Gothenburg, Sweden	10 August 1995
European record	Inessa Kravets (UKR)	15.50 m	Gothenburg, Sweden	10 August 1995
Championship record	Tatyana Lebedeva (RUS)	15.15 m	Gothenburg, Sweden	9 August 2006
World Leading	Caterine Ibargüen (COL)	14.96 m	Rabat, Morocco	13 July 2018
European Leading	Ekaterina Koneva (RUS)	14.66 m	Kazan, Russia	22 July 2018

== Schedule ==
Date	Time	Round
8 August 2018	12:05	Qualification
10 August 2018	21:07	Final

All times are local times (UTC+2)

== Results ==
=== Qualification ===
Qualification: 14.05 m (Q) or best 12 performers (q)

Rank	Group	Name	Nationality	#1	#2	#3	Result	Note
1	A	Paraskevi Papachristou	Greece	14.49			14.49	Q
2	A	Hanna Knyazyeva-Minenko	Israel	13.91	x	14.41	14.41	Q, SB
3	A	Neele Eckhardt	Germany	14.33			14.33	Q, SB
4	B	Rouguy Diallo	France	14.31			14.31	Q, PB
4	B	Kristin Gierisch	Germany	x	14.31		14.31	Q
6	A	Jeanine Assani Issouf	France	13.20	14.30		14.30	Q
7	A	Ana Peleteiro	Spain	14.27			14.27	Q
8	A	Kristiina Mäkelä	Finland	14.24			14.24	Q
9	B	Elena Panțuroiu	Romania	13.93	x	14.20	14.20	Q
10	A	Susana Costa	Portugal	13.80	14.17		14.17	Q, SB
11	B	Naomi Ogbeta	Great Britain	13.64	13.83	14.15	14.15	Q, NU23R
12	A	Gabriela Petrova	Bulgaria	14.05			14.05	Q
13	B	Olha Saladukha	Ukraine	13.85	x	14.04	14.04	
14	A	Anna Jagaciak-Michalska	Poland	11.34	13.87	14.01	14.01	
15	A	Jessie Maduka	Germany	x	x	13.94	13.94	
16	B	Patrícia Mamona	Portugal	12.64	13.81	13.92	13.92	
17	B	Iryna Vaskouskaya	Belarus	13.10	x	13.90	13.90	
18	A	Hanna Krasutska	Ukraine	13.88	13.74	13.41	13.88	
19	A	Lecabela Quaresma	Portugal	x	13.71	13.87	13.87	
20	B	Patricia Sarrapio	Spain	13.87	x	13.60	13.87	
21	A	Violetta Skvartsova	Belarus	13.82	x	13.36	13.82	
22	B	Tähti Alver	Estonia	13.09	13.66	13.76	13.76	
23	B	Dovilė Dzindzaletaitė	Lithuania	13.39	13.75	13.33	13.75	
24	A	Merilyn Uudmäe	Estonia	13.24	x	13.74	13.74	
25	B	María Vicente	Spain	x	x	13.50	13.50	
26	B	Aleksandra Nacheva	Bulgaria	13.39	13.33	13.34	13.39	
27	B	Anna Krylova	Authorised Neutral Athletes	13.05	12.86	13.05	13.05	
	A	Ottavia Cestonaro	Italy	x	x	x	NM	
	B	Dariya Derkach	Italy	x	x	x	NM	

=== Final ===
Rank	Athlete	Nationality	#1	#2	#3	#4	#5	#6	Result	Notes
1st place, gold medalist(s)	Paraskevi Papachristou	Greece	x	14.60	x	x	x	14.32	14.60	=SB
2nd place, silver medalist(s)	Kristin Gierisch	Germany	14.45	13.93	13.24	14.39	14.34	14.23	14.45	PB
3rd place, bronze medalist(s)	Ana Peleteiro	Spain	14.42	14.33	14.12	x	x	14.44	14.44	
4	Elena Panțuroiu	Romania	x	14.19	x	14.38	x	x	14.38	
5	Hanna Knyazyeva-Minenko	Israel	14.37	x	14.15	x	13.65	13.94	14.37	
6	Gabriela Petrova	Bulgaria	14.12	11.61	13.92	14.25	14.26	12.05	14.26	
7	Jeanine Assani Issouf	France	14.12	13.58	14.00	14.00	13.72	13.52	14.12	
8	Rouguy Diallo	France	14.08	x	13.72	13.65	x	13.87	14.08	
9	Kristiina Mäkelä	Finland	13.93	14.01	x				14.01	
10	Neele Eckhardt	Germany	14.01	13.83	12.31				14.01	
11	Susana Costa	Portugal	13.78	13.97	13.87				13.97	
12	Naomi Ogbeta	Great Britain	13.94	13.59	13.23				13.94	
