= 2019 European Athletics Indoor Championships – Women's triple jump =

2019 European Indoor Championship event

The women's triple jump event at the 2019 European Athletics Indoor Championships was held on 1 March at 12:00 (qualification) and 3 March at 10:00 (final) local time.

== Medalists ==
Gold	Silver	Bronze
Ana Peleteiro; Spain	Paraskevi Papahristou; Greece	Olha Saladukha; Ukraine

== Records ==
Standing records prior to the 2019 European Athletics Indoor Championships
World record	Tatyana Lebedeva (RUS)	15.36	Budapest, Hungary	6 March 2004
European record	Tatyana Lebedeva (RUS)	15.36	Budapest, Hungary	6 March 2004
Championship record	Ashia Hansen (GBR)	15.16	Valencia, Spain	28 February 1998
World Leading	Yulimar Rojas (VEN)	14.92	Madrid, Spain	8 February 2019
European Leading	Yekaterina Koneva (RUS)	14.81	Moscow, Russia	25 January 2019

== Results ==
=== Qualification ===
Qualification: Qualifying performance 14.20 (Q) or at least 8 best performers (q) advance to the Final

Rank	Athlete	Nationality	#1	#2	#3	Result	Note
1	Olha Saladukha	Ukraine	14.40			14.40	Q, SB
2	Susana Costa	Portugal	14.28			14.28	Q, PB
2	Paraskevi Papahristou	Greece	14.28			14.28	Q
4	Ana Peleteiro	Spain	14.15	13.99	14.03	14.15	q
5	Patrícia Mamona	Portugal	x	13.86	14.11	14.11	q
6	Rouguy Diallo	France	13.83	14.10	13.86	14.10	q
7	Kristiina Mäkelä	Finland	13.95	14.06	x	14.06	q
8	Anna Krasutska	Ukraine	13.82	x	13.70	13.82	q
9	Naomi Ogbeta	Great Britain	13.80	13.80	13.40	13.80	
10	Iryna Vaskouskaya	Belarus	13.79	x	x	13.79	
11	Jeanine Assani Issouf	France	x	13.60	13.74	13.74	
12	Patricia Sarrapio	Spain	13.67	x	13.63	13.67	
13	Merilyn Uudmäe	Estonia	13.30	12.49	13.40	13.40	SB
14	Tähti Alver	Estonia	13.01	12.87	13.39	13.39	
15	Diana Zagainova	Lithuania	x	13.10	13.36	13.36	
16	Olha Korsun	Ukraine	13.29	13.33	x	13.33	
17	Aleksandra Nacheva	Bulgaria	12.95	12.98	12.88	12.98	
	Dovilė Dzindzaletaitė	Lithuania	x	x	x	NM	

=== Final ===
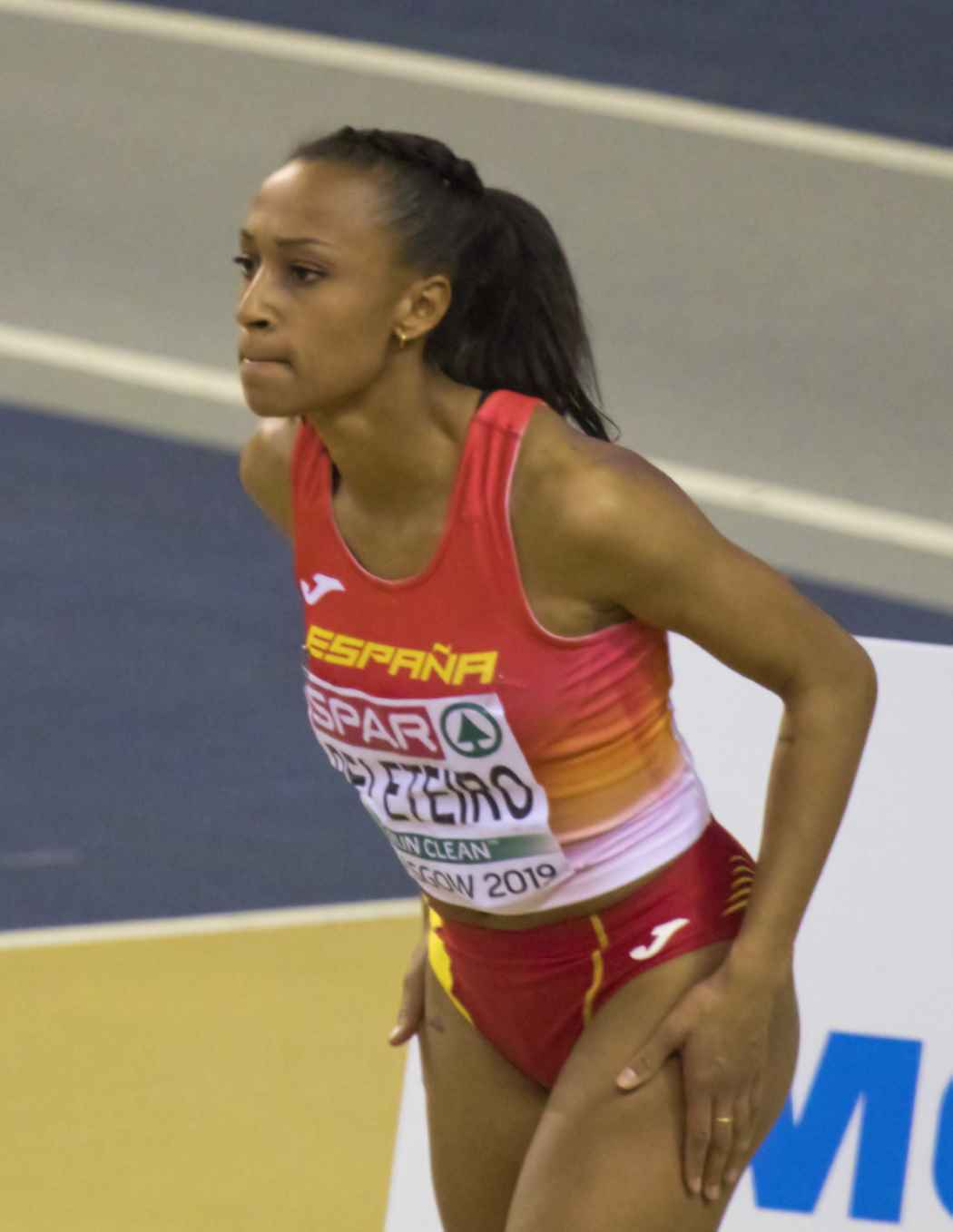
Gold medal winner, Ana Peleteiro

Rank	Athlete	Nationality	#1	#2	#3	#4	#5	#6	Result	Note
1st place, gold medalist(s)	Ana Peleteiro	Spain	x	x	14.56	14.73	x	x	14.73	NR
2nd place, silver medalist(s)	Paraskevi Papahristou	Greece	14.50	x	x	x	14.07	14.33	14.50	PB
3rd place, bronze medalist(s)	Olha Saladukha	Ukraine	x	14.47	13.19	14.47	14.47	x	14.47	SB
4	Patrícia Mamona	Portugal	14.43	x	x	14.29	14.39	14.21	14.43	
5	Susana Costa	Portugal	x	14.43	14.04	x	14.21	14.10	14.43	PB
6	Kristiina Mäkelä	Finland	13.76	14.29	14.12	x	x	x	14.29	
7	Rouguy Diallo	France	x	x	13.98	x	x	14.18	14.18	
8	Anna Krasutska	Ukraine	13.66	13.73	13.50	x	13.35	13.95	13.95	
