= 2016 European Athletics Championships – Women's triple jump =

Women's triple jump at the European Athletics Championships
- Venue: Olympic Stadium
- Location: Amsterdam
- Dates: 8 July (qualification); 10 July (final)
- Competitors: 22 from 17 nations
- Winning mark: 14.58 m NR

Medalists
| gold medal | Patrícia Mamona | Portugal |
| silver medal | Hanna Knyazyeva-Minenko | Israel |
| bronze medal | Paraskevi Papachristou | Greece |

The women's triple jump at the 2016 European Athletics Championships took place at the Olympic Stadium on 8th and 10 July.

== Records ==
Standing records prior to the 2016 European Athletics Championships
| World record | Inessa Kravets (UKR) | 15.50 m | Gothenburg, Sweden | 10 August 1995 |
| European record | Inessa Kravets (UKR) | 15.50 m | Gothenburg, Sweden | 10 August 1995 |
| Championship record | Tatyana Lebedeva (RUS) | 15.15 m | Gothenburg, Sweden | 9 August 2006 |
| World Leading | Caterine Ibargüen (COL) | 15.04 m | Doha, Qatar | 18 July 2014 |
| European Leading | Paraskeví Papahrístou (GRE) | 14.73 m | Athens, Greece | 8 June 2016 |

== Schedule ==
| Date | Time | Round |
|---|---|---|
| 8 July 2016 | 13:10 | Qualification |
| 10 July 2016 | 17:25 | Final |

All times are local times (UTC+2)

== Results ==
=== Qualification ===
Qualification: 14.00 m (Q) or best 12 performances (q)

| Rank | Group | Name | Nationality | #1 | #2 | #3 | Result | Note |
|---|---|---|---|---|---|---|---|---|
| 1 | B | Anna Jagaciak-Michalska | Poland | 13.98 | 14.33 | | 14.33 | Q, SB |
| 2 | A | Jenny Elbe | Germany | 13.51 | 13.53 | 14.24 | 14.24 | Q |
| 3 | A | Hanna Knyazyeva-Minenko | Israel | 13.90 | 14.23w | | 14.23w | Q |
| 4 | A | Dana Velďáková | Slovakia | 13.59 | x | 14.11 | 14.11 | Q, SB |
| 5 | B | Kristin Gierisch | Germany | 13.56 | 13.53w | 14.05 | 14.05 | Q |
| 6 | A | Paraskevi Papachristou | Greece | 14.00 | | | 14.00 | Q |
| 7 | B | Daria Derkach | Italy | x | 13.65 | 13.96w | 13.96w | q |
| 8 | B | Susana Costa | Portugal | 13.66 | 13.94 | 13.73 | 13.94 | q |
| 9 | A | Patrícia Mamona | Portugal | 13.72 | 13.87 | x | 13.87 | q |
| 10 | A | Olha Saladukha | Ukraine | 13.82w | 13.85w | 13.82 | 13.85w | q |
| 11 | B | Lucie Májková | Czech Republic | 13.56 | x | 13.81 | 13.81 | q |
| 12 | B | Kristiina Mäkelä | Finland | 13.62 | 13.80 | 13.77 | 13.80 | q |
| 13 | B | Jeanine Assani-Issouf | France | 13.21 | 13.45 | 13.80 | 13.80 | |
| 14 | B | Ruslana Tsyhotska | Ukraine | 13.78 | x | 13.58 | 13.78 | |
| 15 | B | Laura Samuel | Great Britain | 13.65 | x | x | 13.65 | |
| 16 | A | Elena Andreea Panțuroiu | Romania | 13.51 | 13.63 | 13.62 | 13.63 | |
| 17 | A | Iryna Vaskouskaya | Belarus | 13.61 | 13.35 | x | 13.61 | |
| 18 | A | Rouguy Diallo | France | x | 13.58 | 13.45 | 13.58 | |
| 19 | A | Patricia Sarrapio | Spain | 13.46 | 13.08 | 13.05 | 13.46 | |
| 20 | B | Gabriela Petrova | Bulgaria | x | x | 13.46 | 13.46 | |
| 21 | B | Natallia Viatkina | Belarus | 13.33 | 13.07 | 13.35 | 13.35 | |
| 22 | A | Petra Koren | Slovenia | 13.02 | x | 13.02 | 13.02 | |

=== Final ===
| Rank | Athlete | Nationality | #1 | #2 | #3 | #4 | #5 | #6 | Result | Notes |
|---|---|---|---|---|---|---|---|---|---|---|
| 1st place, gold medalist(s) | Patrícia Mamona | Portugal | x | 13.95 | 14.38w | x | x | 14.58 | 14.58 | NR |
| 2nd place, silver medalist(s) | Hanna Knyazyeva-Minenko | Israel | x | x | 14.51w | x | x | x | 14.51w | |
| 3rd place, bronze medalist(s) | Paraskevi Papachristou | Greece | 14.31 | 14.45 | 14.15 | 14.00 | 14.14 | 14.47 | 14.47 | |
| 4 | Anna Jagaciak-Michalska | Poland | 14.31 | x | 14.15 | x | 14.32 | 14.40w | 14.40w | |
| 5 | Susana Costa | Portugal | x | 14.25 | 13.58 | 14.23 | 14.34 | x | 14.34 | PB |
| 6 | Olha Saladukha | Ukraine | 14.00 | 14.23 | 14.05w | 12.80 | 14.16 | 14.12 | 14.23 | |
| 7 | Jenny Elbe | Germany | 14.08 | 14.08 | x | 13.60 | 13.82 | 13.86 | 14.08 | |
| 8 | Kristin Gierisch | Germany | x | 14.01 | 14.03 | x | 12.92 | 13.92 | 14.03 | |
| 9 | Kristiina Mäkelä | Finland | 13.79 | 13.94 | 13.95 | | | | 13.95 | SB |
| 10 | Daria Derkach | Italy | 13.89 | x | 13.56w | | | | 13.89 | |
| 11 | Dana Velďáková | Slovakia | x | x | 13.74 | | | | 13.74 | |
| 12 | Lucie Májková | Czech Republic | 13.36 | 13.16 | 13.70w | | | | 13.70w | |
