= 2018 IAAF World Indoor Championships – Women's triple jump =

Women's triple jump at the 2018 IAAF World Indoor Championships
- Venue: Arena Birmingham
- Dates: 3 March
- Competitors: 17 from 14 nations
- Winning distance: 14.63

Medalists
gold medal	Yulimar Rojas	Venezuela
silver medal	Kimberly Williams	Jamaica
bronze medal	Ana Peleteiro	Spain

The women's triple jump at the 2018 IAAF World Indoor Championships took place on 3 March 2018.

== Summary ==
With 17 finalists, a qualifying round was barely avoided. In the competition, defending champion Yulimar Rojas took the lead as the first jumper down the runway with a 14.24m. Near the end of the round, Keturah Orji jumped 14.13m to take over second. Then two jumps later, Kimberly Williams took over the lead with a 14.37m. Williams improved upon that in her next two attempts taking the lead out to 14.48m. Rojas also improved to 14.36m. In the third round, Andreea Panturoiu moved past Orji with a 14.16m. At the end of the round Ana Peleteiro moved past Panturoiu with a 14.18m. In the fourth round, Panturoiu jumped her best of the day, 14.33m to move back into silver position only until Peleteiro jumped 14.40m on the next jump. On the next jump, Rojas displaced Panturoiu with a 14.36m. On her fifth attempt, Rojas finally settled the competition with the winner 14.63 m (47 ft 11 3/4 in) to repeat as champion.

== Results ==
The final was started at 11:00.

Rank	Athlete	Nationality	#1	#2	#3	#4	#5	#6	Result	Notes
1st place, gold medalist(s)	Yulimar Rojas	Venezuela	14.24	14.07	14.36	14.27	14.63	x	14.63	WL
2nd place, silver medalist(s)	Kimberly Williams	Jamaica	14.37	14.41	14.48	14.31	x	14.32	14.48	PB
3rd place, bronze medalist(s)	Ana Peleteiro	Spain	13.18	13.82	14.18	14.40	x	x	14.40	PB
4	Andreea Panturoiu	Romania	14.05	x	14.16	14.33	x	x	14.33	=PB
5	Keturah Orji	United States	14.13	x	14.07	14.28	14.31		14.31	
6	Paraskevi Papahristou	Greece	14.05	11.73	14.01	13.36	x		14.05	
7	Viktoriya Prokopenko	Authorised Neutral Athletes	13.76	13.87	14.05	13.72	13.92		14.05	
8	Tori Franklin	United States	14.03	13.52	13.70	11.34	13.94		14.03	
9	Nubia Soares	Brazil	x	13.97	14.00				14.00	SB
10	Shanieka Ricketts	Jamaica	13.93	13.36	13.68				13.93	
11	Gabriela Petrova	Bulgaria	x	x	13.91				13.91	SB
12	Dovilė Dzindzaletaitė	Lithuania	13.90	13.74	13.64				13.90	
13	Neele Eckhardt	Germany	13.24	13.87	13.70				13.87	
14	Iryna Vaskouskaya	Belarus	x	13.81	13.37				13.81	
15	Anna Krylova	Authorised Neutral Athletes	13.75	13.66	13.49				13.75	
16	Kristiina Mäkelä	Finland	x	13.73	13.57				13.73	
17	Thea LaFond	Dominica	x	13.63	13.68				13.68	
