= 2021 European Athletics Indoor Championships – Women's triple jump =

The women's triple jump event at the 2021 European Athletics Indoor Championships was held on 6 March at 12:05 (qualification) and 7 March at 17:20 (final) local time.

== Medalists ==
Gold	Silver	Bronze
Patrícia Mamona; Portugal	Ana Peleteiro; Spain	Neele Eckhardt; Germany

== Records ==
Standing records prior to the 2021 European Athletics Indoor Championships
World record	Yulimar Rojas (VEN)	15.43	Madrid, Spain	21 February 2020
European record	Tatyana Lebedeva (RUS)	15.36	Budapest, Hungary	6 March 2004
Championship record	Ashia Hansen (GBR)	15.16	Valencia, Spain	28 February 1998
World Leading	Paraskevi Papachristou (GRE)	14.60	Toruń, Poland	17 February 2021
European Leading	Paraskevi Papachristou (GRE)	14.60	Toruń, Poland	17 February 2021

== Results ==
=== Qualification ===
Qualification: Qualifying performance 14.10 (Q) or at least 8 best performers (q) advance to the Final.

Rank	Athlete	Nationality	#1	#2	#3	Result	Note
1	Patrícia Mamona	Portugal	14.43			14.43	Q, SB
2	Paraskevi Papachristou	Greece	14.39			14.39	Q
3	Senni Salminen	Finland	13.92	14.22		14.22	Q, PB
4	Neele Eckhardt	Germany	14.12			14.12	Q, SB
5	Ana Peleteiro	Spain	13.82	14.10		14.10	Q
6	Neja Filipič	Slovenia	13.85	14.09	–	14.09	q, PB
7	Kristiina Mäkelä	Finland	14.09	x	–	14.09	q
8	Viyaleta Skvartsova	Belarus	13.67	13.99	13.97	13.99	q
9	Ottavia Cestonaro	Italy	x	13.90	x	13.90	PB
10	Hanna Minenko	Israel	13.37	13.73	13.69	13.73	
11	Spiridoula Karidi	Greece	13.69	x	11.81	13.69	
12	Florentina Iusco	Romania	13.65	x	13.20	13.65	
13	Tuğba Danışmaz	Turkey	13.44	13.56	13.35	13.56	
14	Diana Zagainova	Lithuania	13.45	13.55	13.06	13.55	
15	Jessie Maduka	Germany	x	x	13.50	13.50	
16	Iryna Vaskouskaya	Belarus	13.03	13.21	13.30	13.30	

=== Final ===
Rank	Athlete	Nationality	#1	#2	#3	#4	#5	#6	Result	Note
1st place, gold medalist(s)	Patrícia Mamona	Portugal	14.35	14.38	14.53	x	14.29	x	14.53	NR
2nd place, silver medalist(s)	Ana Peleteiro	Spain	13.98	x	x	14.34	14.19	14.52	14.52	SB
3rd place, bronze medalist(s)	Neele Eckhardt	Germany	14.08	14.18	14.52	x	x	x	14.52	PB
4	Viyaleta Skvartsova	Belarus	x	x	13.55	14.35	13.97	13.89	14.35	
5	Paraskevi Papahristou	Greece	14.27	14.31	14.20	13.91	x	x	14.31	
6	Kristiina Mäkelä	Finland	14.23	x	13.94	13.84	x	14.11	14.23	SB
7	Senni Salminen	Finland	14.06	14.14	x	x	14.12	x	14.14	
8	Neja Filipič	Slovenia	13.78	14.02	13.74	13.74	13.86	x	14.02	
