= 2017 European Athletics Indoor Championships – Women's triple jump =

The women's triple jump event at the 2017 European Athletics Indoor Championships was held on 3 March 2015 at 12:00 (qualification) and 4 March, 17:50 (final) local time.

== Medalists ==
Gold	Silver	Bronze
Kristin Gierisch; Germany	Patrícia Mamona; Portugal	Paraskevi Papachristou; Greece

== Records ==
Standing records prior to the 2017 European Athletics Indoor Championships
World record	Tatyana Lebedeva (RUS)	15.36	Budapest, Hungary	6 March 2004
European record	Tatyana Lebedeva (RUS)	15.36	Budapest, Hungary	6 March 2004
Championship record	Ashia Hansen (GBR)	15.16	Valencia, Spain	28 February 1998
World Leading	Yulimar Rojas (VEN)	14.79	Madrid, Spain	28 January 2017
European Leading	Elena Panțuroiu (ROU)	14.33	Bucharest, Romania	4 February 2017

== Results ==
=== Qualification ===
Qualification: Qualifying performance 14.05 (Q) or at least 8 best performers (q) advance to the Final.

Rank	Athlete	Nationality	#1	#2	#3	Result	Note
1	Jenny Elbe	Germany	13.88	14.27		14.27	Q, PB
2	Kristin Gierisch	Germany	x	14.26		14.26	Q, SB
3	Ana Peleteiro	Spain	x	13.90	14.20	14.20	Q, PB
4	Kristiina Mäkelä	Finland	14.01	14.18		14.18	Q, SB
5	Anna Jagaciak-Michalska	Poland	14.15			14.15	Q, PB
6	Paraskevi Papachristou	Greece	14.12			14.12	Q
7	Patrícia Mamona	Portugal	13.80	13.75	14.03	14.03	q
8	Susana Costa	Portugal	13.72	13.92	13.97	13.97	q, PB
9	Jeanine Assani-Issouf	France	13.93	13.94	13.83	13.94	
10	Iryna Vaskouskaya	Belarus	13.85	x	13.79	13.85	
11	Elena Panțuroiu	Romania	13.51	13.69	13.84	13.84	
12	Dana Velďáková	Slovakia	x	13.44	13.72	13.72	
13	Dariya Derkach	Italy	13.42	13.44	13.69	13.69	
14	Merilyn Uudmäe	Estonia	13.55	12.95	13.18	13.55	PB
15	Cristina Bujin	Romania	13.44	x	x	13.44	
16	Ruslana Tsykhotska	Ukraine	12.71	13.31	13.05	13.31	
17	Petra Koren	Slovenia	13.26	12.17	11.47	13.26	
18	Neele Eckhardt	Germany	13.22	x	11.84	13.22	

=== Final ===
Rank	Athlete	Nationality	#1	#2	#3	#4	#5	#6	Result	Note
1st place, gold medalist(s)	Kristin Gierisch	Germany	x	14.37	x	x	x	13.91	14.37	EL
2nd place, silver medalist(s)	Patrícia Mamona	Portugal	14.24	14.25	14.29	x	14.32	14.01	14.32	SB
3rd place, bronze medalist(s)	Paraskevi Papachristou	Greece	14.04	14.20	14.24	14.17	x	x	14.24	SB
4	Anna Jagaciak-Michalska	Poland	13.82	13.92	x	14.14	13.89	13.91	14.14	
5	Ana Peleteiro	Spain	14.13	x	x	13.72	13.65	x	14.13	
6	Jenny Elbe	Germany	14.12	x	11.99	13.91	13.02	x	14.12	
7	Susana Costa	Portugal	13.83	13.99	x	13.89	13.65	13.71	13.99	PB
8	Kristiina Mäkelä	Finland	13.56	13.70	x	13.73	13.57	13.68	13.73	
