= 2012 European Athletics Championships – Women's triple jump =

Women's triple jump at the European Athletics Championships

The women's triple jump at the 2012 European Athletics Championships was held at the Helsinki Olympic Stadium on 27 and 29 June.

== Medalists ==
Gold	Olha Saladukha; Ukraine
Silver	Patrícia Mamona; Portugal
Bronze	Yana Borodina; Russia

== Records ==
Standing records prior to the 2012 European Athletics Championships
World record	Inessa Kravets (UKR)	15.50	Gothenburg, Sweden	10 August 1995
European record	Inessa Kravets (UKR)	15.50	Gothenburg, Sweden	10 August 1995
Championship record	Tatyana Lebedeva (RUS)	15.15	Gothenburg, Sweden	9 August 2006
World Leading	Caterine Ibargüen (COL)	14.95	Medellín, Colombia	28 April 2012
European Leading	Kseniya Dziatsuk (BLR)	14.76	Brest, Belarus	26 May 2012
Broken records during the 2012 European Athletics Championships
European Leading	Olha Saladukha (UKR)	14.77	Helsinki, Finland	27 June 2012
World and European Leading	Olha Saladukha (UKR)	14.99	Helsinki, Finland	29 June 2012

== Schedule ==
Date	Time	Round
27 June 2012	12:25	Qualification
29 June 2012	21:00	Final

== Results ==
=== Qualification ===
Qualification: Qualification Performance 14.20 (Q) or at least 12 best performers advance to the final

Rank	Group	Athlete	Nationality	#1	#2	#3	Result	Notes
1	A	Olha Saladukha	Ukraine	14.77			14.77	Q, EL
2	B	Patrícia Mamona	Portugal	14.41			14.41	Q
3	B	Françoise Mbango Etone	France	x	x	14.38	14.38	Q
4	B	Dana Velďáková	Slovakia	13.92	14.36		14.36	Q, SB
5	B	Paraskevi Papahristou	Greece	14.35			14.35	Q
6	B	Yana Borodina	Russia	14.03	14.28		14.28	Q
7	A	Athanasia Perra	Greece	x	14.22		14.22	Q
8	B	Kseniya Dziatsuk	Belarus	13.83	14.20		14.20	Q
9	A	Marija Šestak	Slovenia	14.09	14.17	13.34	14.17	q
10	A	Simona La Mantia	Italy	13.85	14.14	13.90	14.14	q
11	B	Svetlana Bolshakova	Belgium	13.66	13.91	14.09	14.09	q
12	A	Níki Panéta	Greece	x	14.08	13.78	14.08	q
13	A	Susana Costa	Portugal	13.64	x	13.99	13.99	
14	B	Jenny Elbe	Germany	13.89	13.90	13.98	13.98	
15	B	Snežana Rodić	Slovenia	x	13.63	13.95	13.95	
16	A	Patricia Sarrapio	Spain	13.83	13.90	x	13.90	SB
17	B	Ruslana Tsykhotska	Ukraine	x	13.87	x	13.87	
18	A	Hanna Demydova	Ukraine	13.72	x	x	13.72	
19	A	Olesya Zabara	Russia	13.54	13.69	13.56	13.69	
20	A	Adelina Gavrilă	Romania	13.61	13.22	13.07	13.61	
21	B	Cristina Bujin	Romania	x	13.34	x	13.34	
22	A	Katja Demut	Germany	13.31	x	13.13	13.31	
	A	Petia Dacheva	Bulgaria	x	x	x	NM	
	B	Kristiina Mäkelä	Finland	x	x	x	NM	
	B	Andriana Bânova	Bulgaria	x	x	x	NM	

=== Final ===
Rank	Athlete	Nationality	#1	#2	#3	#4	#5	#6	Result	Notes
1st place, gold medalist(s)	Olha Saladukha	Ukraine	14.99	14.84	x	14.65	x	14.89	14.99	WL
2nd place, silver medalist(s)	Patrícia Mamona	Portugal	14.52	14.07	x	14.22	13.97	14.21	14.52	NR
3rd place, bronze medalist(s)	Yana Borodina	Russia	14.15	14.07	14.00	14.02	14.36	14.35	14.36	
4	Simona La Mantia	Italy	14.25	x	13.73	x	x	13.64	14.25	
5	Dana Velďáková	Slovakia	13.90	x	14.24	x	x	x	14.24	
6	Níki Panéta	Greece	x	14.23	14.15	x	x	x	14.23	
7	Athanasia Perra	Greece	x	14.00	14.23	x	x	x	14.23	
8	Françoise Mbango Etone	France	x	x	14.19	13.95	14.03	14.15	14.19	
9	Svetlana Bolshakova	Belgium	x	14.07	13.83				14.07	
10	Marija Šestak	Slovenia	x	x	14.01				14.01	
11	Paraskevi Papahristou	Greece	x	13.89	x				13.89	
12	Kseniya Dziatsuk	Belarus	x	13.87	13.55				13.87	
