= 2022 World Athletics Indoor Championships – Women's triple jump =

Women's triple jump at the 2022 World Athletics Indoor Championships
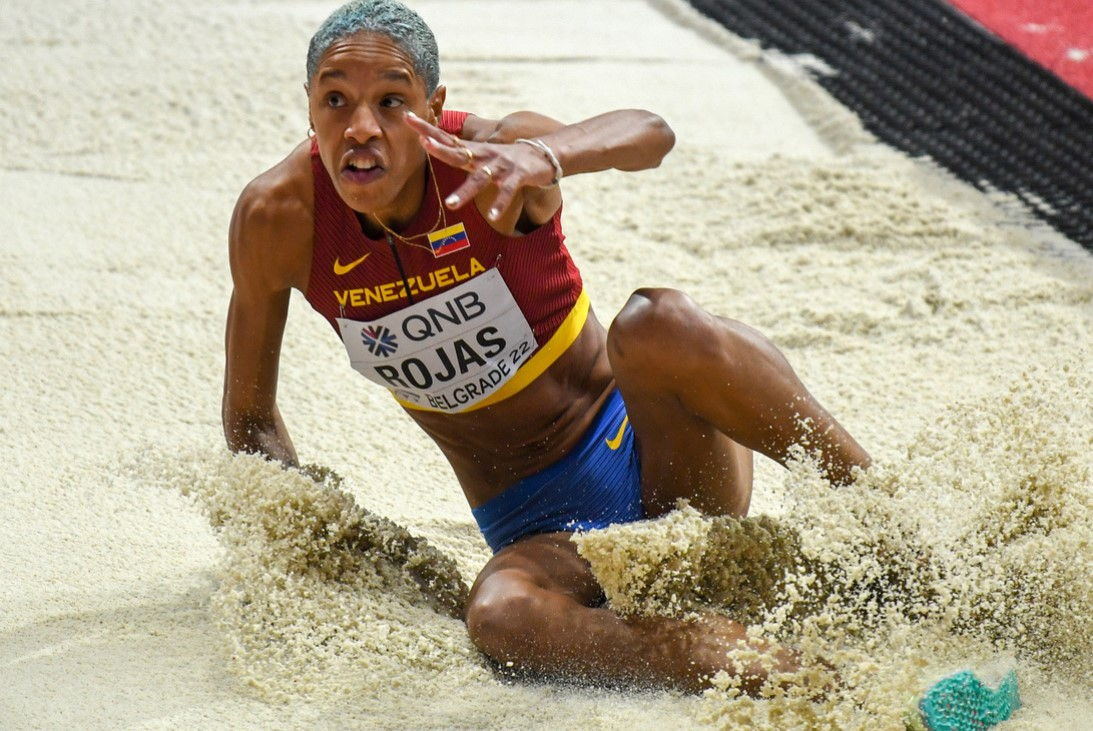
- Yulimar Rojas landing her final jump, which broke the world record.
- Venue: Štark Arena
- Dates: 20 March
- Competitors: 16 from 14 nations
- Winning distance: 15.74

Medalists
gold medal	Yulimar Rojas	Venezuela
silver medal	Maryna Bekh-Romanchuk	Ukraine
bronze medal	Kimberly Williams	Jamaica

The women's triple jump at the 2022 World Athletics Indoor Championships took place on 20 March 2022.

The winning margin was 1.00 metre which as of July 2024 remains the only time the women's triple jump was won by more than half a metre at these championships.

== Summary ==
Kimberly Williams opened the competition with a season best 14.59 metres. Three jumpers later, Thea LaFond came close with a 14.53 m. Then Yulimar Rojas made her first attempt, 15.19 m. Game over. Only one other competitor had ever gone over 15 m. The battle would be for the other medals.

Those three jumps, from the first 5 attempts in the competition, held the medal positions until the last jump of the fifth round, when Rojas improved her hold on the lead to 15.36m. Only the 9th best jump of her career, it was a distance only three other jumpers had ever achieved. The next jumper on the runway was Ukrainian Maryna Bekh-Romanchuk. After training through the first weeks of the 2022 Russian invasion of Ukraine, then being shuttled out of the country for these championships, she put together a massive personal best 14.74 m to rocket from eighth to second. While Williams was able to improve on her final attempt, 14.62m still left her in bronze medal position. Already confirmed as the winner, Rojas made one more attempt down the runway. It was 15.74 m (51 ft 7 1/2 in), a new world record to win the competition by exactly 1 metre, improving 7 cm over her previous record set in the Olympics.

== Results ==
The final was started at 11:00.

Rank	Athlete	Nationality	#1	#2	#3	#4	#5	#6	Result	Notes
1st place, gold medalist(s)	Yulimar Rojas	Venezuela	15.19	x	15.04	x	15.36	15.74	15.74	WR
2nd place, silver medalist(s)	Maryna Bekh-Romanchuk	Ukraine	14.28	14.07	x	x	x	14.74	14.74	PB
3rd place, bronze medalist(s)	Kimberly Williams	Jamaica	14.59	x	14.40	13.79	x	14.62	14.62	SB
4	Thea LaFond	Dominica	14.53	x	13.81	13.84	14.43	x	14.53	
5	Liadagmis Povea	Cuba	14.16	14.37	14.22	14.43	14.45	14.15	14.45	SB
6	Patrícia Mamona	Portugal	14.27	14.24	14.42	x	x	14.42	14.42	SB
7	Keturah Orji	United States	14.25	14.35	14.39	14.19	14.42	14.36	14.42	SB
8	Ana Peleteiro	Spain	14.30	14.08	x	14.25	x	13.60	14.30	SB
9	Kristiina Mäkelä	Finland	x	x	14.14				14.14	SB
10	Neja Filipič	Slovenia	14.13	x	13.83				14.13	SB
11	Leyanis Pérez	Cuba	13.76	x	13.99				13.99	
12	Neele Eckhardt-Noack	Germany	x	12.40	13.96				13.96	
13	Tori Franklin	United States	13.89	13.63	13.71				13.89	
14	Hanna Minenko	Israel	x	13.83	x				13.83	
15	Dariya Derkach	Italy	13.67	x	13.61				13.67	
16	Jovana Ilić	Serbia	13.09	13.36	13.00				13.36	
