= Neele Eckhardt =

German triple jumper

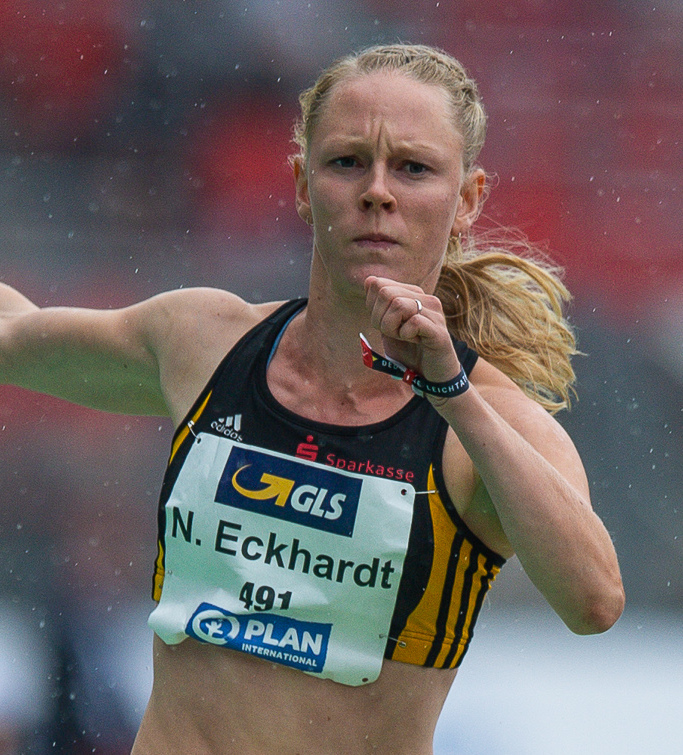
- Neele Eckhardt in 2018

Personal information
- Nationality: German
- Born: 2 July 1992 (age 34)

Sport
- Sport: Athletics
- Event: Triple jump
Medal record
Women's athletics
Representing Germany
European Indoor Championships
| Bronze medal – third place | 2021 Toruń | Triple jump |
Summer Universiade
| Gold medal – first place | 2017 Taipei | Triple jump |

Neele Eckhardt-Noack (born 2 July 1992) is a German triple jumper. She competed in the women's triple jump at the 2017 World Championships in Athletics.

== International competitions ==
| Year | Competition | Venue | Position | Event | Notes |
Representing Germany
| 2009 | World Youth Championships | Brixen, Italy | 12th | Long jump | 5.81 m |
| 2009 | World Youth Championships | Brixen, Italy | 10th | Triple jump | 12.61 m |
| 2010 | World Junior Championships | Moncton, Canada | 8th | Triple jump | 12.91 m (w) |
| 2013 | European U23 Championships | Tampere, Finland | 8th | Triple jump | 13.16 m |
| 2017 | European Indoor Championships | Belgrade, Serbia | 18th (q) | Triple jump | 13.22 m |
| 2017 | World Championships | London, United Kingdom | 12th | Triple jump | 13.97 m |
| 2017 | Universiade | Taipei, Taiwan | 1st | Triple jump | 13.91 m |
| 2018 | World Indoor Championships | Birmingham, United Kingdom | 13th | Triple jump | 13.87 m |
| 2018 | European Championships | Berlin, Germany | 10th | Triple jump | 14.01 m |
| 2021 | European Indoor Championships | Toruń, Poland | 3rd | Triple jump | 14.52 m |
| 2021 | Olympic Games | Tokyo, Japan | 13th (q) | Triple jump | 14.20 m |
| 2022 | World Indoor Championships | Belgrade, Serbia | 12th | Triple jump | 13.96 m |
| 2022 | World Championships | Eugene, United States | 20th (q) | Triple jump | 13.93 m |
| 2022 | European Championships | Munich, Germany | 4th | Triple jump | 14.43 m |
