= Jeanine Assani Issouf =

French triple jumper (born 1992)

Personal information
- Born: 17 August 1992 (age 34) Marseille, France
- Height: 170 cm (5 ft 7 in)
- Weight: 53 kg (117 lb)

Sport
- Country: France
- Sport: Athletics (track and field)
- Event: Triple jump
- Club: Limoges Athlé
- Coached by: Jean-Christophe Sautour

Jeanine Assani Issouf (born 17 August 1992) is a French athlete whose specialty is the triple jump. She competed at the 2015 World Championships in Beijing finishing ninth.

Her personal bests in the event are 14.40 metres outdoors (2016 French National Championships) and 14.13 metres indoors (Aubière 2015).

On 19 March 2016, Assani-Issouf finished 7th in the final of World Indoor Championships at Portland with a jump of 14.07m. On 6 May, she bettered her personal best to 14.26 m at the 2016 IAAF Diamond League in Doha where she finished 4th.

On 26 June 2016, she won her first French Outdoor Championship with a jump of 14.40 m, a personal best.

Assani-Issouf is originally from the island of Mayotte.

== Competition record ==
Year	Competition	Venue	Position	Event	Notes
Representing France
2011	European Junior Championships	Tallinn, Estonia	9th	Triple jump	12.80 m
2013	European U23 Championships	Tampere, Finland	–	Triple jump	NM
2015	European Indoor Championships	Prague, Czech Republic	15th (q)	Triple jump	13.71 m
2015	World Championships	Beijing, China	9th	Triple jump	14.12 m
2016	World Indoor Championships	Portland, United States	7th	Triple jump	14.07 m
2016	European Championships	Amsterdam, Netherlands	13th (q)	Triple jump	13.80 m
2016	Olympic Games	Rio de Janeiro, Brazil	19th (q)	Triple jump	13.97 m
2017	European Indoor Championships	Belgrade, Serbia	9th (q)	Triple jump	13.94 m
2017	World Championships	London, United Kingdom	18th (q)	Triple jump	13.87 m
2017	DécaNation	Angers, France	1st	Triple jump	13.62 m
2018	European Championships	Berlin, Germany	7th	Triple jump	14.12 m
2019	European Indoor Championships	Glasgow, United Kingdom	11th (q)	Triple jump	13.74 m
2022	Mediterranean Games	Oran, Algeria	4th	Triple jump	13.56 m
