= Athletics at the 2020 Summer Olympics – Women's triple jump =

Women's triple jump at the Games of the XXXII Olympiad
- Olympic Athletics
- Venue: Japan National Stadium
- Dates: 30 July 2021 (qualifying); 1 August 2021 (final)
- Competitors: 33 from 23 nations
- Winning distance: 15.67 m WR

Medalists
1st place, gold medalist(s)		Yulimar Rojas	Venezuela
2nd place, silver medalist(s)		Patrícia Mamona	Portugal
3rd place, bronze medalist(s)		Ana Peleteiro	Spain

The women's triple jump event at the 2020 Summer Olympics took place between 30 July and 1 August 2021 at the Japan National Stadium.

The event was won by Yulimar Rojas of Venezuela: Her winning jump of 15.67 meters also broke the 26-year-old world record.

== Summary ==
On the second jump of the competition, the overwhelming favorite, Yulimar Rojas opened equalling the third best jump of her career, 15.41 m, which was also the fourth best jump in history, and an Olympic record. Patrícia Mamona followed her with a personal best 14.91 m to move into silver position. Liadagmis Povea jumped 14.70 m to get into third position. In the second round, she was displaced by Ana Peleteiro who jumped 14.77 m. Rojas' third jump was spectacular, video estimation showed her landing close to a foot beyond the world record, the front of her feet crossing 16 metres, but it was a foul by 13.5 cm. With fouls on her first two attempts, Shanieka Ricketts barely made it into the next round, jumping 14.47 m on her third attempt. On her fourth attempt to start the round, she jumped 14.84 m to move into bronze medal position. Towards the end of the fourth round, Mamona made her second personal best, getting over 15 metres with a 15.01 m. Peleteiro jumped 14.87 m in the fifth round to take over the bronze position. The 2016 champion, Caterine Ibargüen, made it to the final but was eliminated after three jumps, finishing tenth.

On the final jump of the competition, with the gold medal already secured, Rojas jumped 15.67 m (51 ft 4 3/4 in), improving on Inessa Kravets' 26-year-old world record by 17 centimeters (6.7 inches).

== Background ==
This was the 7th appearance of the event, having appeared at every Summer Olympics since 1996.

== Qualification ==
Approximately 35 athletes were expected to compete; the exact number was dependent on how many nations use universality places to enter athletes in addition to the 32 qualifying through distance or ranking (1 universality place was used in 2016).

A National Olympic Committee (NOC) could enter up to 3 qualified athletes in the women's triple jump event if all athletes meet the entry standard or qualify by ranking during the qualifying period. (The limit of 3 has been in place since the 1930 Olympic Congress.) The qualifying standard is 14.32 metres. This standard was "set for the sole purpose of qualifying athletes with exceptional performances unable to qualify through the World Athletics Rankings pathway." The world rankings, based on the average of the best five results for the athlete over the qualifying period and weighted by the importance of the meet, will then be used to qualify athletes until the cap of 32 is reached.

The qualifying period was originally from 1 May 2019 to 29 June 2020. Due to the COVID-19 pandemic, the period was suspended from 6 April 2020 to 30 November 2020, with the end date extended to 29 June 2021. The world rankings period start date was also changed from 1 May 2019 to 30 June 2020; athletes who had met the qualifying standard during that time were still qualified, but those using world rankings would not be able to count performances during that time. The qualifying distance standards could be obtained in various meets during the given period that have the approval of World Athletics. Both outdoor and indoor meets are eligible. The most recent Area Championships may be counted in the ranking, even if not during the qualifying period.

NOCs can also use their universality place—each NOC can enter one female athlete regardless of time if they had no female athletes meeting the entry standard for an athletics event—in the triple jump.

== Competition format ==
The 2020 competition continued to use the two-round format with divided final introduced in 1936. The qualifying round gave each competitor three jumps to achieve the qualifying distance of 14.40 metres; if fewer than 12 women do so, the top 12 (including all those tied) will advance. The final provided each jumper with three jumps; the top eight jumpers received an additional three jumps for a total of six, with the best to count (qualifying round jumps are not considered for the final).

== Records ==
Prior to this competition, the existing global and area records were as follows.

World record	Inessa Kravets (UKR)	15.50	Gothenburg, Sweden	10 August 1995
Olympic record	Françoise Mbango Etone (CMR)	15.39	Beijing, China	17 August 2008
World Leading	Yulimar Rojas (VEN)	15.43	Andújar, Spain	22 May 2021

Area	Distance (m)	Wind	Athlete	Nation
Africa (records)	15.39	+0.5	Françoise Mbango Etone	Cameroon
Asia (records)	15.25	+1.7	Olga Rypakova	Kazakhstan
Europe (records)	15.50 WR	+0.9	Inessa Kravets	Ukraine
North, Central America and the Caribbean (records)	15.29	+0.3	Yamilé Aldama	Cuba
Oceania (records)	14.04	+1.8	Nicole Mladenis	Australia
South America (records)	15.41	+1.5	Yulimar Rojas	Venezuela

The following new world and Olympic records were set during this competition.

Date	Event	Athlete	Nation	Distance (m)	WR	OR
1 August	Final	Yulimar Rojas	Venezuela	15.67	WR	OR

The following national records were established during the competition:

Nation	Athlete	Round	Distance	Notes
Dominica	Thea LaFond	Qualifying	14.60 m	
Venezuela	Yulimar Rojas	Final	15.67 m	WR, OR, AR
Portugal	Patrícia Mamona	Final	15.01 m	
Spain	Ana Peleteiro	Final	14.87 m	

== Schedule ==
All times are Japan Standard Time (UTC+9)

The women's triple jump took place over two separate days.

Date	Time	Round
Friday, 30 July 2021	19:00	Qualifying
Sunday, 1 August 2021	19:00	Final

== Results ==
=== Qualifying round ===
Progression rules: Qualifying performance 14.40 (Q) or at least 12 best performers (q) advance to the Final.

Rank	Group	Athlete	Nation	1	2	3	Distance	Notes
1	A	Yulimar Rojas	Venezuela	14.77	—	—	14.77	Q
2	A	Ana Peleteiro	Spain	14.34	14.62	—	14.62	Q, SB
3	B	Thea Lafond	Dominica	14.60	—	—	14.60	Q, NR
4	B	Patrícia Mamona	Portugal	14.54	—	—	14.54	Q
5	B	Liadagmis Povea	Cuba	14.50	—	—	14.50	Q
6	B	Shanieka Ricketts	Jamaica	14.43	—	—	14.43	Q
7	A	Caterine Ibargüen	Colombia	14.02	14.08	14.37	14.37	q, SB
8	B	Hanna Minenko	Israel	14.27	14.35	14.36	14.36	q, =SB
9	A	Kimberly Williams	Jamaica	13.38	13.86	14.30	14.30	q
10	B	Rouguy Diallo	France	14.20	14.29	13.91	14.29	q
11	A	Keturah Orji	United States	14.26	13.91	14.17	14.26	q
12	B	Kristiina Mäkelä	Finland	14.21	14.06	14.08	14.21	q
13	A	Senni Salminen	Finland	14.20	13.68	14.07	14.20	
14	A	Neele Eckhardt-Noack	Germany	13.88	13.92	14.20	14.20	
15	B	Davisleydi Velazco	Cuba	14.14	x	x	14.14	
16	B	Ana José Tima	Dominican Republic	13.87	14.11	x	14.11	
17	B	Núbia Soares	Brazil	x	14.04	14.07	14.07	
18	B	Viyaleta Skvartsova	Belarus	13.93	x	14.05	14.05	
19	A	Evelise Veiga	Portugal	13.93	13.63	13.57	13.93	SB
20	A	Olha Saladukha	Ukraine	13.49	13.91	13.88	13.91	=SB
21	A	Dariya Derkach	Italy	13.69	13.73	13.90	13.90	
22	A	Gabriela Petrova	Bulgaria	x	13.79	x	13.79	
23	A	Jasmine Moore	United States	x	x	13.76	13.76	
24	B	Olga Rypakova	Kazakhstan	13.66	13.69	x	13.69	SB
25	B	Tori Franklin	United States	13.23	13.68	13.58	13.68	
26	A	Mariya Ovchinnikova	Kazakhstan	x	13.34	x	13.34	
27	B	Yosiris Urrutia	Colombia	x	x	13.16	13.16	SB
28	B	Diana Zagainova	Lithuania	x	13.10	x	13.10	
29	A	Roksana Khudoyarova	Uzbekistan	12.63	13.02	13.01	13.02	
30	B	Kristin Gierisch	Germany	x	13.02	r	13.02	
31	A	Irina Ektova	Kazakhstan	x	12.90	x	12.90	
32	B	Paraskevi Papachristou	Greece	x	12.23	x	12.23	
	A	Nadia Eke	Ghana	x	x	x	—	NM
	A	Leyanis Pérez	Cuba					DNS

=== Final ===
Rank	Athlete	Nation	1	2	3	4	5	6	Distance	Notes
1st place, gold medalist(s)	Yulimar Rojas	Venezuela	15.41	14.53	x	15.25	x	15.67	15.67	WR, OR
2nd place, silver medalist(s)	Patrícia Mamona	Portugal	14.91	12.30	x	15.01	14.66	14.97	15.01	NR
3rd place, bronze medalist(s)	Ana Peleteiro	Spain	14.55	14.77	x	14.63	14.87	14.65	14.87	NR
4	Shanieka Ricketts	Jamaica	x	x	14.47	14.84	14.62	14.76	14.84	
5	Liadagmis Povea	Cuba	14.70	14.70	14.52	14.31	14.38	14.50	14.70	
6	Hanna Minenko	Israel	14.52	14.60	14.27	14.29	x	x	14.60	SB
7	Keturah Orji	United States	14.59	14.10	13.82	14.12	14.43	x	14.59	
8	Kimberly Williams	Jamaica	13.77	x	14.51	14.12	14.47	14.28	14.51	
9	Rouguy Diallo	France	14.38	14.28	x	Did not advance			14.38	
10	Caterine Ibargüen	Colombia	14.25	14.01	14.19	Did not advance			14.25	
11	Kristiina Mäkelä	Finland	14.17	14.03	13.90	Did not advance			14.17	
12	Thea LaFond	Dominica	x	12.57	x	Did not advance			12.57	
