= Jessie Maduka =

German triple jumper

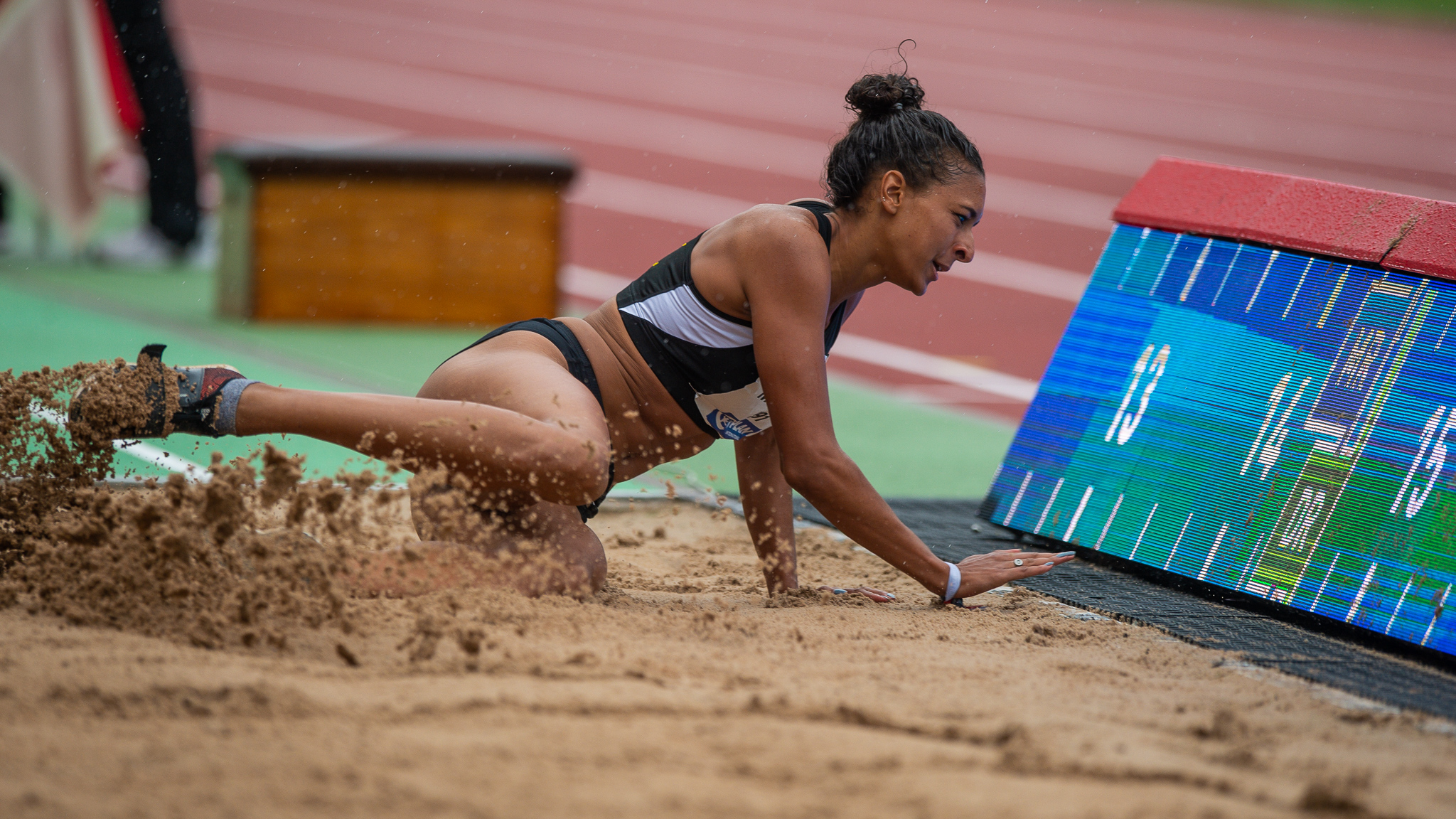
- Jessie Maduka in 2018

Personal information
- Born: 23 April 1996 (age 30) Düsseldorf, Germany
- Education: University of California, Los Angeles
- Height: 1.84 m (6 ft 0 in)
- Weight: 70 kg (154 lb)

Sport
- Sport: Athletics
- Event: Triple jump
- College team: UCLA Bruins
- Club: Cologne Athletics; ART Düsseldorf
- Coached by: Sven Timmermann; Ralf Jaros; Rob Jarvis

Jessie Maduka (born 23 April 1996) is a German athlete specialising in the triple jump. Earlier in her career she competed in the sprints and won a silver medal in the 4 × 100 metres relay at the 2012 World Junior Championships.

Her personal bests in the triple jump are 13.95 metres outdoors (-0.4 m/s, London 2018) and 13.81 metres indoors (Dortmund 2018).

Between 2014 and 2018 she studied at UCLA.

== International competitions ==
Year	Competition	Venue	Position	Event	Notes
Representing Germany
2012	World Junior Championships	Barcelona, Spain	2nd	4 × 100 m relay	44.24
2013	World Youth Championships	Donetsk, Ukraine	7th	Triple jump	11.84
2015	European Junior Championships	Eskilstuna, Sweden	4th	Long jump	6.31 m (w)
2017	European U23 Championships	Bydgoszcz, Poland	8th	Triple jump	13.43 m
2018	World Cup	London, United Kingdom	5th	Triple jump	13.95 m
2018	European Championships	Berlin, Germany	15th (q)	Triple jump	13.94 m
2021	European Indoor Championships	Toruń, Poland	15th (q)	Triple jump	13.50 m
2022	World Championships	Eugene, United States	27th (q)	Triple jump	13.30 m
2022	European Championships	Munich, Germany	22nd (q)	Triple jump	12.11 m
2025	European Indoor Championships	Apeldoorn, Netherlands	13th (q)	Triple jump	13.50 m
2025	World Indoor Championships	Nanjing, China	8th	Triple jump	13.82 m
2025	World Championships	Tokyo, Japan	30th (q)	Triple jump	13.47 m
