= 2016 IAAF World Indoor Championships – Women's triple jump =

Women's triple jump at the 2016 IAAF World Indoor Championships
- Venue: Oregon Convention Center
- Dates: March 19
- Competitors: 15 from 12 nations
- Winning distance: 14.41

Medalists
gold medal	Yulimar Rojas	Venezuela
silver medal	Kristin Gierisch	Germany
bronze medal	Paraskevi Papachristou	Greece

Video on YouTube Official Video

The women's triple jump at the 2016 IAAF World Indoor Championships took place on March 19, 2016.

The first round of jumps were mostly disappointments to these 14 meter jumpers as Keturah Orji was the only one to break that barrier with 14.13. Four more athletes broke 14 in the second round, with Paraskevi Papachristou barely taking the lead with 14.15 and doing a dance to celebrate. The lead lasted barely 2 minutes before newcomer Yulimar Rojas popped 14.41. That jump stood up as the winner of the competition, neither Rojas or Panturoiu could find the board for the rest of their attempts. Kristin Gierisch edged into second place with a fourth round 14.16, then confirmed her silver medal with a 14.30 in the fifth round. As the Olympics go to South America for the first time, Rojas joins Caterine Ibargüen as South American athletes at the top of world championships in this event.

== Results ==
The final was started at 11:37.

Rank	Athlete	Nationality	#1	#2	#3	#4	#5	#6	Result	Notes
1st place, gold medalist(s)	Yulimar Rojas	Venezuela	x	14.41	x	x	x	x	14.41	
2nd place, silver medalist(s)	Kristin Gierisch	Germany	13.73	14.07	13.92	14.16	14.30	14.08	14.30	SB
3rd place, bronze medalist(s)	Paraskeví Papahrístou	Greece	x	14.15	x	x	x	x	14.15	
4	Keturah Orji	United States	14.13	x	14.04	14.08	13.96	14.14	14.14	SB
5	Elena Panturoiu	Romania	13.96	x	14.02	14.11	14.11		14.11	
6	Kristiina Mäkelä	Finland	x	14.04	13.92	14.07	13.93		14.07	
7	Jeanine Assani Issouf	France	x	13.65	14.07	13.84	x		14.07	
8	Shanieka Thomas	Jamaica	13.73	13.46	13.95	13.85	13.94		13.95	SB
9	Keila Costa	Brazil	13.66	13.94	x				13.94	SB
10	Christina Epps	United States	13.68	x	x				13.68	
11	Ana Peleteiro	Spain	13.59	13.57	13.37				13.59	
12	Carmen Toma	Romania	13.31	x	13.31				13.31	
13	Iryna Vaskouskaya	Belarus	13.28	13.19	13.07				13.28	
14	Sanna Nygård	Finland	x	13.21	13.20				13.21	
	Ayanna Alexander	Trinidad and Tobago	x	x	x				NM	
