= Ana Peleteiro =

Spanish triple jumper (born 1995)

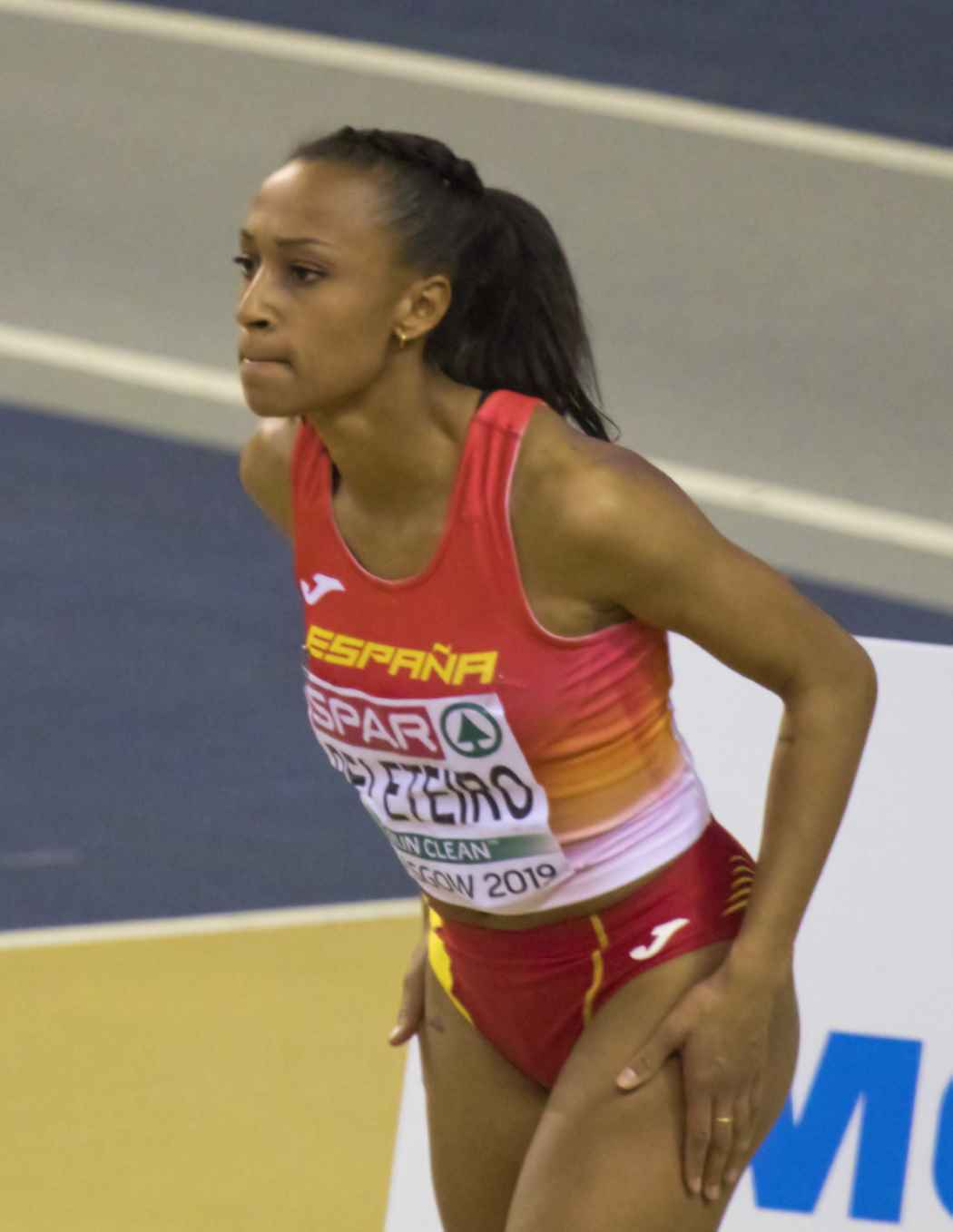
- Peleteiro in 2019

Personal information
- Full name: Ana Peleteiro-Compaoré Brión
- Nationality: Spanish
- Born: Ana Peleteiro Brión; 2 December 1995 (age 30) A Coruña, Spain
- Height: 1.71 m (5 ft 7 in)
- Weight: 52 kg (115 lb)

Sport
- Country: Spain
- Sport: Athletics
- Event: Triple jump

Achievements and titles
- Olympic finals: (bronze) with 14.87 m (48 ft 9 1/4 in) NR
- Personal bests: Triple jump (outdoor): 14.87 m (48 ft 9 1/4 in) NR; Triple jump (indoor): 14.74 m (48 ft 4 1/4 in); Long jump (outdoor): 5.99 m (19 ft 7 3/4 in); Long jump (indoor): 5.87 m (19 ft 3 in)
Medal record
Women's athletics
Representing Spain
Olympic Games
Bronze medal – third place	2020 Tokyo	Triple jump
World Indoor Championships
Bronze medal – third place	2018 Birmingham	Triple jump
Bronze medal – third place	2024 Glasgow	Triple jump
Bronze medal – third place	2025 Nanjing	Triple jump
European Championships
Gold medal – first place	2024 Rome	Triple jump
Bronze medal – third place	2018 Berlin	Triple jump
European Indoor Championships
Gold medal – first place	2019 Glasgow	Triple jump
Gold medal – first place	2025 Apeldoorn	Triple jump
Silver medal – second place	2021 Toruń	Triple jump

Ana Peleteiro-Compaoré Brión (née Peleteiro Brión; born 2 December 1995 in A Coruña, Spain) is a Spanish triple jumper and the current national record holder. She won the gold medal in the 2019 European Athletics Indoor Championships and at the 2024 European Championships. She had previously won bronze medals at the 2018 World Indoor Championships and 2018 European Championships. At the 2020 Summer Olympics, she won the bronze medal with a national record of 14.87 m.

She received the award for Best Young Athlete from the Royal Spanish Athletics Federation in 2011.

== Personal life ==
Peleteiro was born in the province of La Coruña, Spain, to an African father and Spanish mother, and adopted by a Spanish family as an only child. She is married to the French triple jumper Benjamin Compaoré, and had a daughter with him in December 2022.

== International competitions ==
Year	Competition	Venue	Position	Notes
2011	World Youth Championships	Lille, France	3rd	12.92 m
2011	European Youth Olympic Festival	Trabzon, Turkey	1st	13.17 m
2012	World Junior Championships	Barcelona, Spain	1st	14.17 m
2013	European Junior Championships	Rieti, Italy	3rd	13.29 m
2014	World Junior Championships	Eugene, United States	6th	13.71 m w (+3.2 m/s)
2016	World Indoor Championships	Portland, United States	11th	13.59 m
2017	European Indoor Championships	Belgrade, Serbia	5th	14.13 m
2017	European U23 Championships	Bydgoszcz, Poland	2nd	14.19 m
2017	World Championships	London, United Kingdom	7th	14.23 m
2018	World Indoor Championships	Birmingham, United Kingdom	3rd	14.40 m
2018	European Championships	Berlin, Germany	3rd	14.44 m
2019	European Indoor Championships	Glasgow, United Kingdom	1st	14.73 m
2019	World Championships	Doha, Qatar	6th	14.47 m
2021	European Indoor Championships	Toruń, Poland	2nd	14.52 m
2021	Olympic Games	Tokyo, Japan	3rd	14.87 m NR
2022	World Indoor Championships	Belgrade, Serbia	8th	14.30 m
2024	World Indoor Championships	Glasgow, United Kingdom	3rd	14.75 m
2024	European Championships	Rome, Italy	1st	14.85 m
2024	Olympic Games	Paris, France	6th	14.59 m
2025	European Indoor Championships	Apeldoorn, Netherlands	1st	14.37 m
2025	World Indoor Championships	Nanjing, China	3rd	14.29 m
