= Christina Epps =

American triple jumper

Personal information
- Born: June 20, 1991 (age 35) Bronx, New York, United States
- Height: 5 ft 9 in (175 cm)
- Weight: 140 lb (64 kg)

Sport
- Sport: Track and field
- Event: Triple jump
- College team: Coppin State University
- Turned pro: 2014

Achievements and titles
- Personal best: Triple jump: 14.17 m (46 ft 5 3/4 in)(Eugene 2016)

Christina Epps (born June 20, 1991) is an American track and field athlete who specializes in the triple jump. She competed at the 2015 World Championships in Beijing without qualifying for the final. Her personal bests in the event are 14.09 metres outdoors (+1.1 m/s, Eugene 2015) and 13.16 metres indoors (New York 2014).

Epps grew up in Morristown, New Jersey and graduated from Morristown High School in 2009. In college, she competed for the Coppin State Eagles track and field team.

Keturah Orji joined Team USA teammate Andrea Geubelle as the only two with 2016 Olympic Standard at 2016 United States Olympic Trials (track and field) and will represent the United States at Athletics at the 2016 Summer Olympics and in the fifth round the pair were joined by Christina Epps who jumped the 2016 Olympic Standard to form a trio for Rio.

== Competition record ==
| Year | Competition | Venue | Position | Event | Notes |
Representing the United States
| 2015 | Pan American Games | Toronto, Canada | 7th | Triple jump | 13.85 m |
| 2015 | NACAC Championships | San José, Costa Rica | 9th | Triple jump | 12.81 m (w) |
| 2015 | World Championships | Beijing, China | 24th (q) | Triple jump | 13.36 m |
| 2016 | World Indoor Championships | Portland, United States | 10th | Triple jump | 13.68 m |
| 2016 | Olympic Games | Rio de Janeiro, Brazil | 15th (q) | Triple jump | 14.01 m |
