= Patrícia Mamona =

Portuguese triple jumper (born 1988)

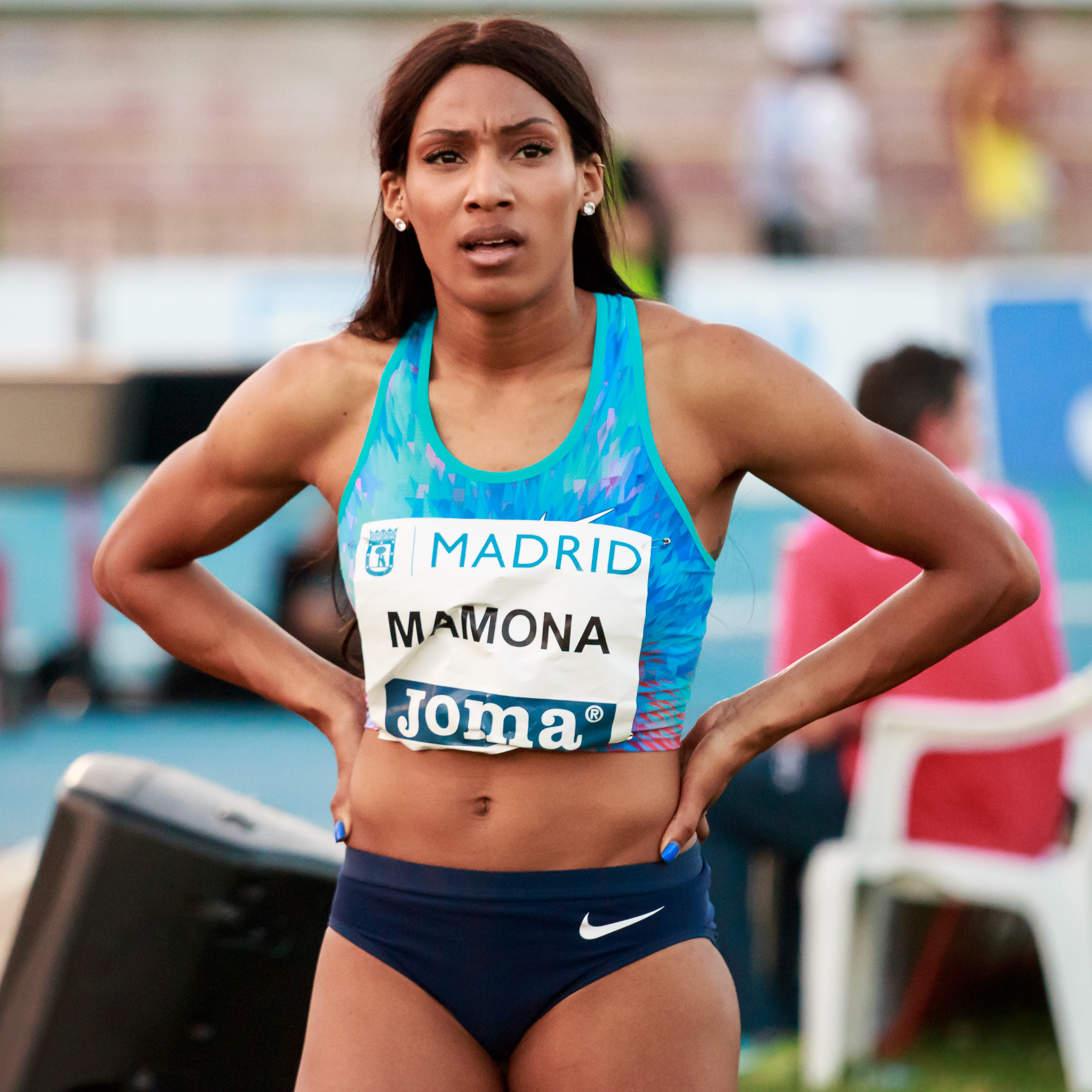
- Mamona in 2017

Personal information
- Born: 21 November 1988 (age 37) São Jorge de Arroios, Lisbon, Portugal
- Height: 1.66 m (5 ft 5 1/2 in)
- Weight: 61 kg (134 lb)

Sport
- Country: Portugal
- Sport: Athletics
- Event: Triple jump
- Club: Sporting CP

Achievements and titles
- Olympic finals: (silver) with 15.01 m (49 ft 2 3/4 in) NR
- Personal bests: Triple jump (outdoor): 15.01 m (49 ft 2 3/4 in) NR; Triple jump (indoor): 14.53 m (47 ft 8 in) NR
Medal record
Women's athletics
Representing Portugal
Olympic Games
Silver medal – second place	2020 Tokyo	Triple jump
European Championships
Gold medal – first place	2016 Amsterdam	Triple jump
Silver medal – second place	2012 Helsinki	Triple jump
European Indoor Championships
Gold medal – first place	2021 Toruń	Triple jump
Silver medal – second place	2017 Belgrade	Triple jump
Bronze medal – third place	2023 Istanbul	Triple jump
European Team Championships
Gold medal – first place	2014 Tallinn (FL)	Triple jump
Gold medal – first place	2017 Vaasa (FL)	Triple jump
Lusophony Games
Gold medal – first place	2009 Lisbon	Triple jump
Bronze medal – third place	2006 Macau	Triple jump
Bronze medal – third place	2006 Macau	Long jump

Patrícia Mbengani Bravo Mamona ComM (born 21 November 1988) is a Portuguese triple jumper of Angolan descent. She won the gold medal at the 2016 European Athletics Championships in Amsterdam, Netherlands. This was her first-ever major senior title and second European Championships medal, after a silver at the 2012 championships. In 2021, she won the gold medal at the European Indoor Championships in Toruń, Poland after recovering for 4 weeks from COVID-19. At the 2020 Tokyo Olympics, she won the silver medal with a national record of 15.01 m. At club level, she represents Sporting Clube de Portugal.

Mamona attended Clemson University and won two NCAA Championships in women's triple jump (2010, 2011).

== International competitions ==
Year	Competition	Venue	Position	Event	Notes
Representing Portugal
2006	World Junior Championships	Beijing, China	4th	Triple jump	13.37 m (+0.9 m/s)
2006	Lusophony Games	Macau, PR China	3rd	Triple jump	12.15 m
2006	Lusophony Games	Macau, PR China	3rd	Long jump	5.65 m
2007	European Junior Championships	Hengelo, Netherlands	15th (q)	Triple jump	12.76 m
2009	Lusophony Games	Lisbon, Portugal	4th	100 m hurdles	13.90 s
2009	Lusophony Games	Lisbon, Portugal	1st	Triple jump	13.79 m
2009	European U23 Championships	Kaunas, Lithuania	5th	Triple jump	13.71 m
2010	European Championships	Barcelona, Spain	8th	Triple jump	14.07 m
2011	Universiade	Shenzhen, China	2nd	Triple jump	14.23 m
2011	World Championships	Daegu, South Korea	27th (q)	Triple jump	13.59 m
2012	European Championships	Helsinki, Finland	2nd	Triple jump	14.52 m NR
2012	Olympic Games	London, United Kingdom	13th (q)	Triple jump	14.11 m
2013	European Indoor Championships	Gothenburg, Sweden	8th	Triple jump	13.72 m
2014	World Indoor Championships	Sopot, Poland	4th	Triple jump	14.26 m
2014	European Championships	Zürich, Switzerland	13th (q)	Triple jump	13.62 m
2015	European Indoor Championships	Prague, Czech Republic	5th	Triple jump	14.32 m
2015	World Championships	Beijing, China	16th (q)	Triple jump	13.74 m
2016	European Championships	Amsterdam, Netherlands	1st	Triple jump	14.58 m NR
2016	Olympic Games	Rio de Janeiro, Brazil	6th	Triple jump	14.65 m NR
2017	European Indoor Championships	Belgrade, Serbia	2nd	Triple jump	14.32 m
2017	World Championships	London, United Kingdom	9th	Triple jump	14.12 m
2018	Mediterranean Games	Tarragona, Spain	6th	Triple jump	13.79 m
2018	European Championships	Berlin, Germany	16th (q)	Triple jump	13.92 m
2019	European Indoor Championships	Glasgow, United Kingdom	4th	Triple jump	14.43 m
2019	World Championships	Doha, Qatar	8th	Triple jump	14.40 m
2021	European Indoor Championships	Toruń, Poland	1st	Triple jump	14.53 m
2021	Olympic Games	Tokyo, Japan	2nd	Triple jump	15.01 m NR
2022	World Indoor Championships	Belgrade, Serbia	6th	Triple jump	14.42 m
2022	World Championships	Eugene, United States	8th	Triple jump	14.29 m
2022	European Championships	Munich, Germany	5th	Triple jump	14.41 m
2023	European Indoor Championships	Istanbul, Turkey	3rd	Triple jump	14.16 m
