= Kristin Gierisch =

German triple jumper (born 1990)

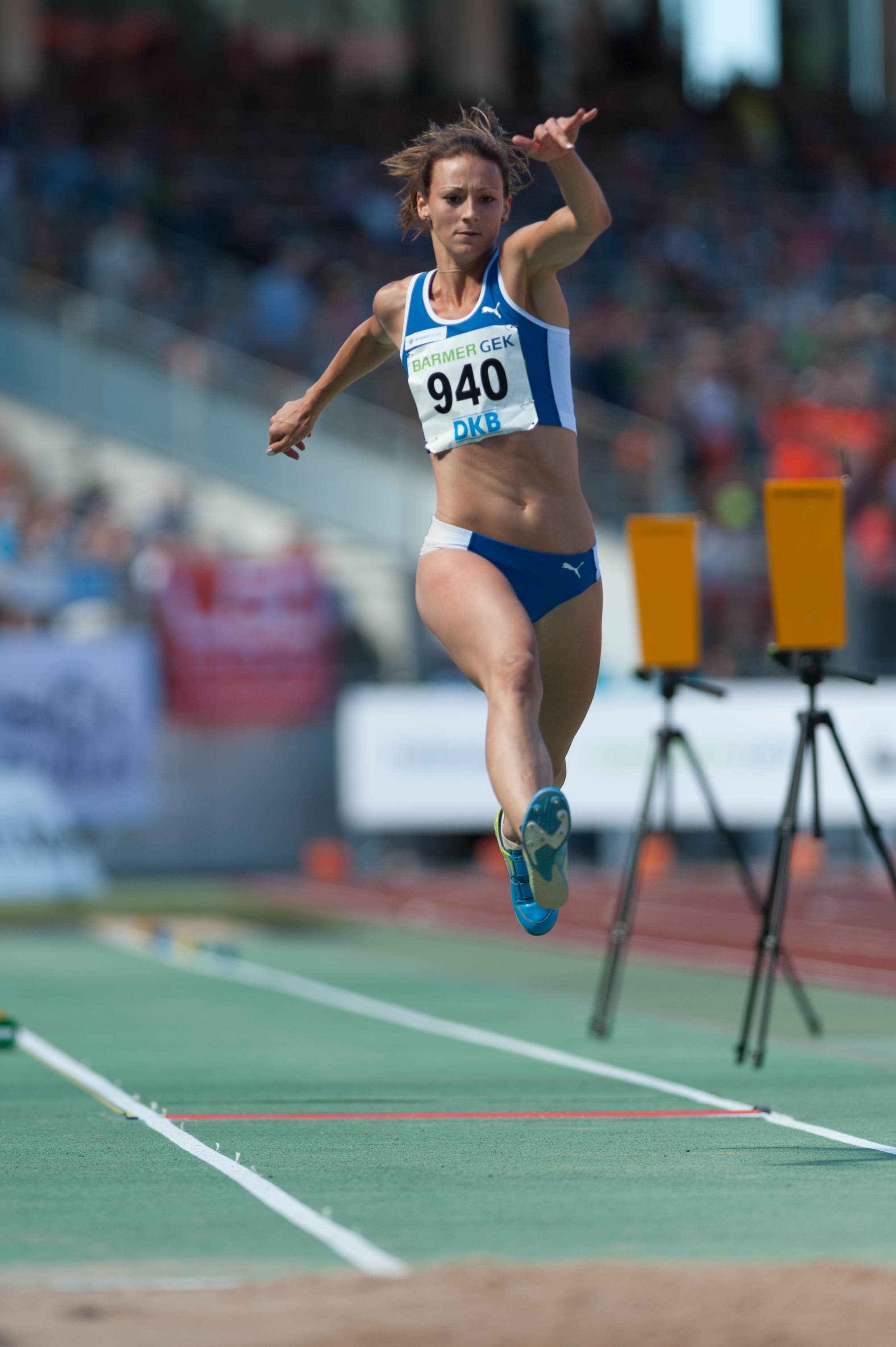

Personal information
- Born: 20 August 1990 (age 35) Zwickau, East Germany
- Height: 1.78 m (5 ft 10 in)
- Weight: 61 kg (134 lb)

Sport
- Country: Germany
- Sport: Athletics
- Event: Women's Triple Jump
Medal record
World Indoor Championships
Silver medal – second place	2016 Portland	Triple jump
European Championships
Silver medal – second place	2018 Berlin	Triple Jump
European Indoor Championships
Gold medal – first place	2017 Belgrade	Triple Jump

Kristin Gierisch (born 20 August 1990 in Zwickau) is a German athlete specialising in the triple jump. She won the silver medal at the 2016 World Indoor Championships, 2018 European Championships and gold at the 2017 European Indoor Championships . She also finished fourth at the 2015 European Indoor Championships and ninth at the 2014 European Championships.

Her personal bests in the event are 14.45 metres outdoors (-0,5 m/s; Berlin 2018) and 14.46 metres indoors (Prague 2015).

== Competition record ==
Year	Competition	Venue	Position	Event	Notes
Representing Germany
2007	World Youth Championships	Ostrava, Czech Republic	6th	Triple jump	12.70 m
2009	European Junior Championships	Novi Sad, Serbia	5th	Triple jump	13.42 m (w)
2011	European U23 Championships	Ostrava, Czech Republic	10th (q)	Triple jump	13.23 m^{1}
2012	World Indoor Championships	Istanbul, Turkey	17th (q)	Triple jump	13.67 m
2014	European Championships	Zürich, Switzerland	9th	Triple jump	13.76 m
2015	European Indoor Championships	Prague, Czech Republic	4th	Triple jump	14.46 m
2015	World Championships	Beijing, China	8th	Triple jump	14.25 m
2016	World Indoor Championships	Portland, United States	2nd	Triple jump	14.30 m
2016	European Championships	Amsterdam, Netherlands	8th	Triple jump	14.03 m
2016	Olympic Games	Rio de Janeiro, Brazil	11th	Triple jump	13.96 m
2017	European Indoor Championships	Belgrade, Serbia	1st	Triple jump	14.37 m
2017	World Championships	London, United Kingdom	5th	Triple jump	14.33 m
2018	European Championships	Berlin, Germany	2nd	Triple jump	14.45 m, PB
2021	Olympic Games	Tokyo, Japan	29th (q)	Triple jump	13.02 m
2022	European Championships	Munich, Germany	16th (q)	Triple jump	13.59 m
2024	European Championships	Rome, Italy	10th	Triple jump	13.74 m

^{1}Did not start in the final.
