= Susana Costa =

Portuguese triple jumper

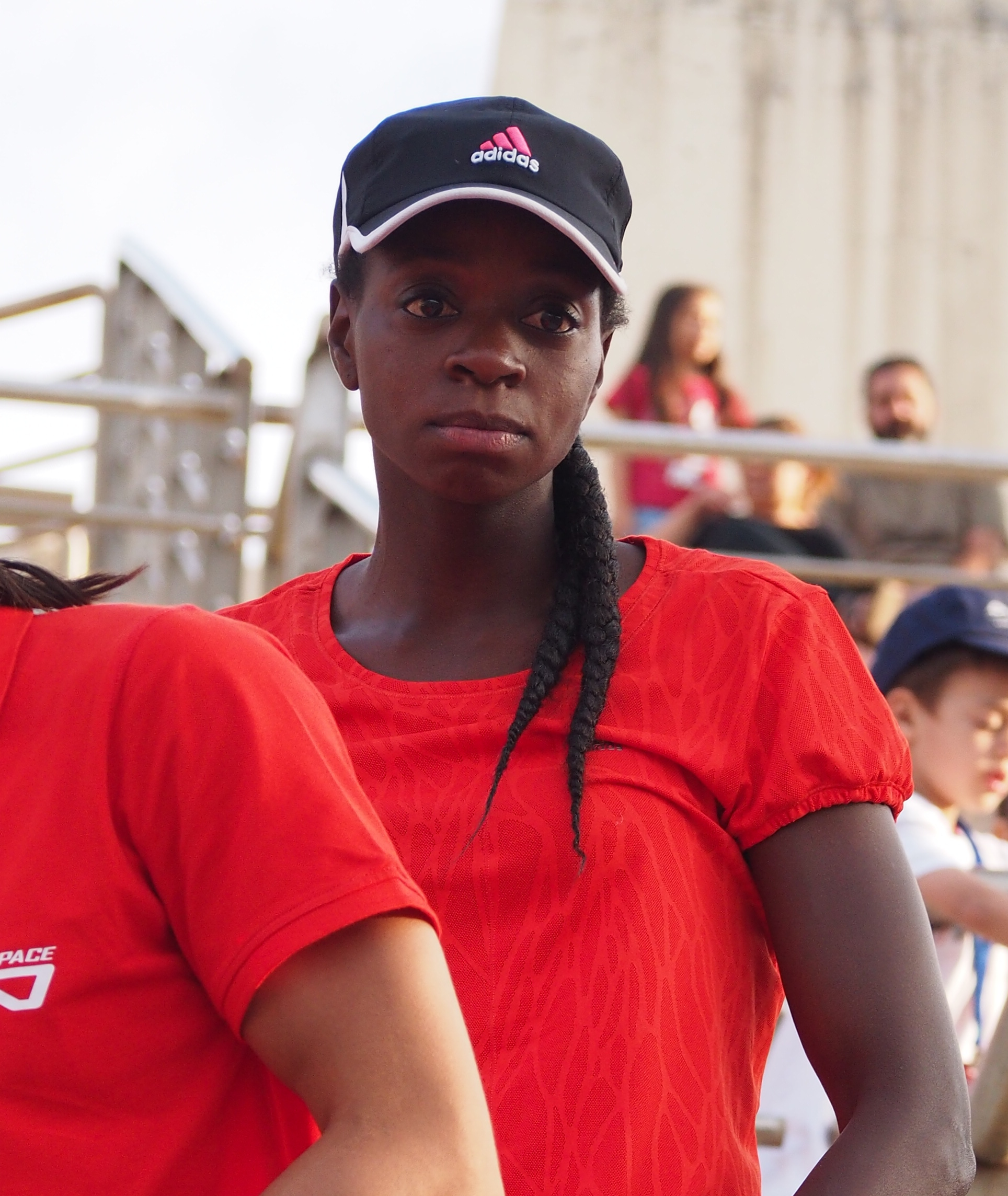
- Susana Costa at 2015 European Team Championships First League

Personal information
- Born: 22 September 1984 (age 41) Setúbal, Portugal
- Height: 1.78 m (5 ft 10 in)
- Weight: 64 kg (141 lb)

Sport
- Country: Portugal
- Sport: Athletics
- Event: Women's Triple Jump

Susana Cristina Saíde da Costa (born 22 September 1984) is a Portuguese athlete specialising in the triple jump. She finished eighth at the 2014 European Championships in Zürich. In addition, she won the gold medal at the 2012 Ibero-American Championships and the silver at the 2006 Lusophony Games.

Her personal bests in the event are 14.35 metres outdoors (London 2017) and 14.43 metres indoors (Glasgow 2019). At club level she represents S.L. Benfica.

== Competition record ==
Year	Competition	Venue	Position	Event	Notes
Representing Portugal
2004	Ibero-American Championships	Huelva, Spain	6th	Triple jump	12.91 m
2006	Lusophony Games	Macau, China	2nd	Triple jump	12.46 m
2007	European Indoor Championships	Birmingham, United Kingdom	12th (q)	Triple jump	13.43 m
2012	Ibero-American Championships	Barquisimeto, Venezuela	1st	Triple jump	13.78 m
2012	European Championships	Helsinki, Finland	13th (q)	Triple jump	13.99 m
2013	European Indoor Championships	Gothenburg, Sweden	12th (q)	Triple jump	13.74 m
2014	European Championships	Zürich, Switzerland	8th	Triple jump	13.78 m
2015	European Indoor Championships	Prague, Czech Republic	14th (q)	Triple jump	13.78 m
2015	World Championships	Beijing, China	—	Triple jump	NM
2016	European Championships	Amsterdam, Netherlands	5th	Triple jump	14.34
2016	Olympic Games	Rio de Janeiro, Brazil	9th	Triple jump	14.12 m
2017	European Indoor Championships	Belgrade, Serbia	7th	Triple jump	13.99 m
2017	World Championships	London, United Kingdom	11th	Triple jump	13.99 m
2018	Mediterranean Games	Tarragona, Spain	5th	Triple jump	13.81 m
2018	European Championships	Berlin, Germany	11th	Triple jump	13.97 m
2019	European Indoor Championships	Glasgow, United Kingdom	5th	Triple jump	14.43 m
2019	World Championships	Doha, Qatar	20th (q)	Triple jump	13.77 m
