= Paraskevi Papachristou =

Greek athlete (born 1989)

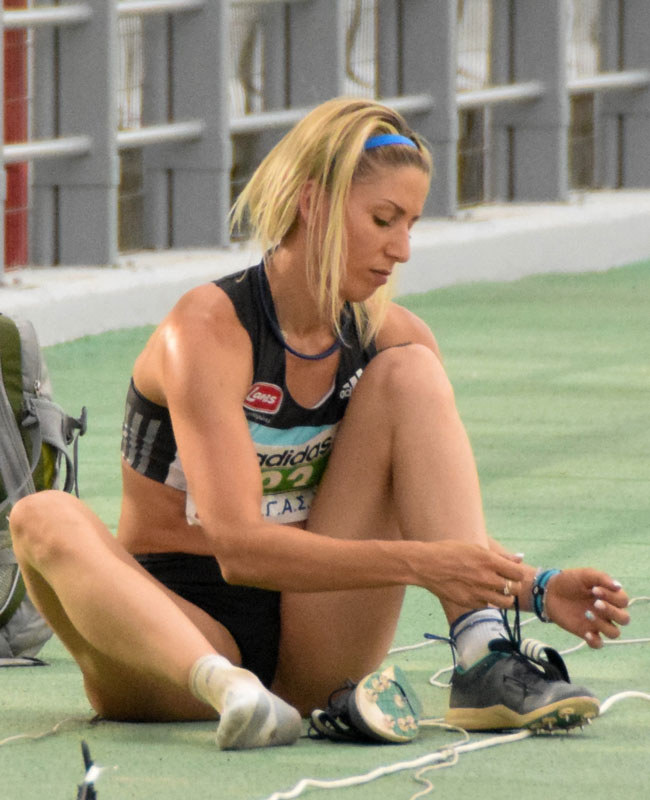

Personal information
- Native name: Παρασκευή Παπαχρήστου
- Nickname: Voula
- Nationality: Greek
- Born: 17 April 1989 (age 37) Athens, Greece
- Height: 1.70 m (5 ft 7 in)
- Weight: 53 kg (117 lb)

Sport
- Country: Greece
- Sport: Triple jump
- Club: A.O.Kallistos
- Coached by: George Pomaski

Achievements and titles
- Personal bests: 14.73 m 14.60 m (i)
Medal record
World Indoor Championships
Bronze medal – third place	2016 Portland	Triple jump
European Championships
Gold medal – first place	2018 Berlin	Triple jump
Bronze medal – third place	2016 Amsterdam	Triple jump
European Indoor Championships
Silver medal – second place	2019 Glasgow	Triple Jump
Bronze medal – third place	2017 Belgrade	Triple Jump
European U23 Championships
Gold medal – first place	2011 Ostrava	Triple Jump
Gold medal – first place	2009 Kaunas	Triple Jump
Mediterranean Games
Bronze medal – third place	Pescara 2009	Triple Jump
World Junior Championships
Bronze medal – third place	2008 Bydgoszcz	Triple Jump
Representing Europe
Continental Cup
Bronze medal – third place	2018 Ostrava	Triple jump

Paraskevi "Voula" Papachristou (Greek: Παρασκευή (Βούλα) Παπαχρήστου [parasceˈvi papaˈxristu]; born 17 April 1989) is a Greek triple jumper and long jumper. She won two gold medals at the European Athletics U23 Championships and took the third place at the 2016 World indoor Championships. She was removed from the Greek team for the 2012 London Olympics by the Greek Olympic Committee after making a racist comment online. At the 2016 Summer Olympics' final in Rio de Janeiro, she took the 8th place. In 2018 she was the European Champion in Berlin with a jump of 14,60 metres.

== Career ==
Born in Athens, Papachristou won the bronze medal at the 2008 World Junior Championships. She competed in the 2009 European Indoor Championships and went through the qualification round with a jump of 14.47 metres. However, in the final, she was injured and failed to register a valid jump. After taking the bronze medal at the 2009 Mediterranean Games, she competed at the 2009 World Championships without reaching the final round. She won the gold medal at the 2009 European U23 Championships that season. During the indoor season of 2011, she competed in the qualifying rounds of the 2011 European Athletics Indoor Championships without reaching the final. She achieved a personal best of 14.72 metres in June 2011 in Chania – a mark which ranks her third among Greek female triple jumpers, after Hrysopiyi Devetzi and Paraskevi Tsiamita. This jump was also the second best ever achieved by a European under-23 athlete after Anna Pyatykh's record of 14.79 m. She successfully defended her gold medal at the 2011 European U23 Championships in Ostrava, Czech Republic.

=== Expulsion from 2012 Olympics ===
Papachristou was to compete in the 2012 Summer Olympics, but was expelled from the Greek team on 25 July 2012 after she posted on her Twitter account a message which has been translated to: "With so many Africans in Greece... the West Nile mosquitoes will at least eat homemade food!!!" This was in reference to a small outbreak of West Nile virus in Greece that had sickened at least five and killed one person. The tweet, for which she later apologized for being an unfortunate and tasteless joke, was condemned by the Greek Olympic Committee as contrary to Olympic values and ideals.

=== 2013–2019 ===
In May 2013, the Greek athletics federation suspended her athletic benefits effective from 4 January 2013, stating that the athlete's benefits would be reinstated if she began training with an approved coach and resumed high-level competition. Papachristou took a break from track and returned in 2015 - after the birth of her daughter - with George Pomaski as a trainer.

She won the bronze medal at the 2016 World Indoor Championships in Portland, as well as at the European Championships in Amsterdam. At the Summer Olympics in Rio de Janeiro, she took eighth place. At the 2018 European Championships in Berlin she won the gold medal. The following year she took the second place at the European Indoor Championships in Glasgow.

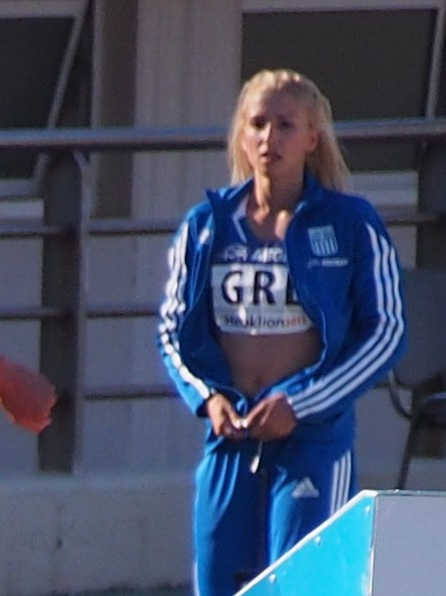
Paraskevi Papachristou at 2015 European Team Championships First League

== Competition record ==
Year	Competition	Venue	Position	Notes
Representing Greece
2008	World Junior Championships	Bydgoszcz, Poland	3rd	13.74 m (-0.8 m/s)
2009	European Indoor Championships	Turin, Italy	Final	NM
2009	European U23 Championships	Kaunas, Lithuania	1st	14.34 m (+0.3 m/s) (PB)
2009	Mediterranean Games	Pescara, Italy	3rd	14.12 m
2011	European U23 Championships	Ostrava, Czech Republic	1st	14.40 m (+1.2 m/s)
2011	World Championships	Daegu, South Korea	16th (sf)	14.05 m
2012	European Championships	Helsinki, Finland	11th	13.89 m
2016	World Indoor Championships	Portland, United States	3rd	14.15 m
2016	European Championships	Amsterdam, Netherlands	3rd	14.47 m
2016	Olympic Games	Rio de Janeiro, Brazil	8th	14.26 m
2017	European Indoor Championships	Belgrade, Serbia	3rd	14.24 m
2017	World Championships	London, United Kingdom	20th (sf)	13.75 m
2018	World Indoor Championships	Birmingham, United Kingdom	6th	14.05 m
2018	European Championships	Berlin, Germany	1st	14.60 m
2018	Continental Cup	Ostrava, Czech Republic	3rd	14.22 m
2019	European Indoor Championships	Glasgow, United Kingdom	2nd	14.50 m
2019	European Team Championships	Bydgoszcz, Poland	1st	14.48 m
2021	European Indoor Championships	Toruń, Poland	5th	14.31 m
2021	Olympic Games	Tokyo, Japan	32nd (q)	12.23 m

== Personal bests ==
Date	Event	Venue	Mark
8 June 2016	Triple jump	Filothei, Greece	14.73 m
3 March 2019	Triple jump (indoor)	Glasgow, United Kingdom	14.50 m
15 June 2012	Long jump	Athens, Greece	6.60 m
31 January 2016	Long jump (indoor)	Piraeus, Greece	6.51 m
