= Kristiina Mäkelä =

Finnish triple jumper (born 1992)

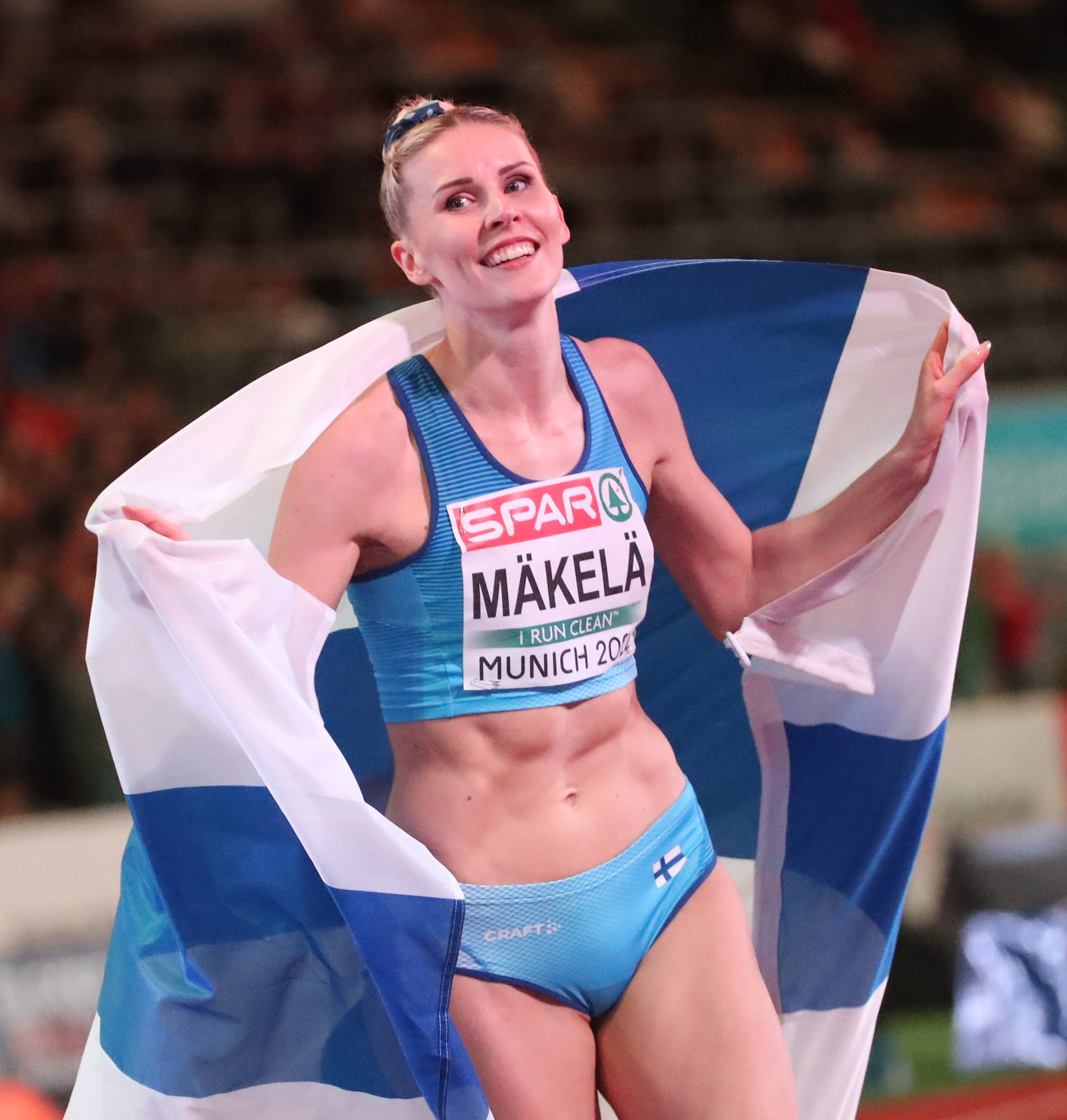
- Kristiina Mäkelä in 2022

Personal information
- Born: 20 November 1992 (age 33) Orimattila, Finland
- Height: 1.85 m (6 ft 1 in)
- Weight: 68 kg (150 lb)

Sport
- Sport: Track and field
- Event: Triple jump
- Club: Orimattilan Jymy
- Coached by: Jarkko Kumpulainen (-2014), Jarkko Kumpulainen & Markku Leppänen (2014-2015), Markku Leppänen (2015-2016), Suren Ghazaryan (2016-2018), Tuomas Sallinen (2018-)
Medal record
European Championships
Silver medal – second place	2022 Munich	Triple jump

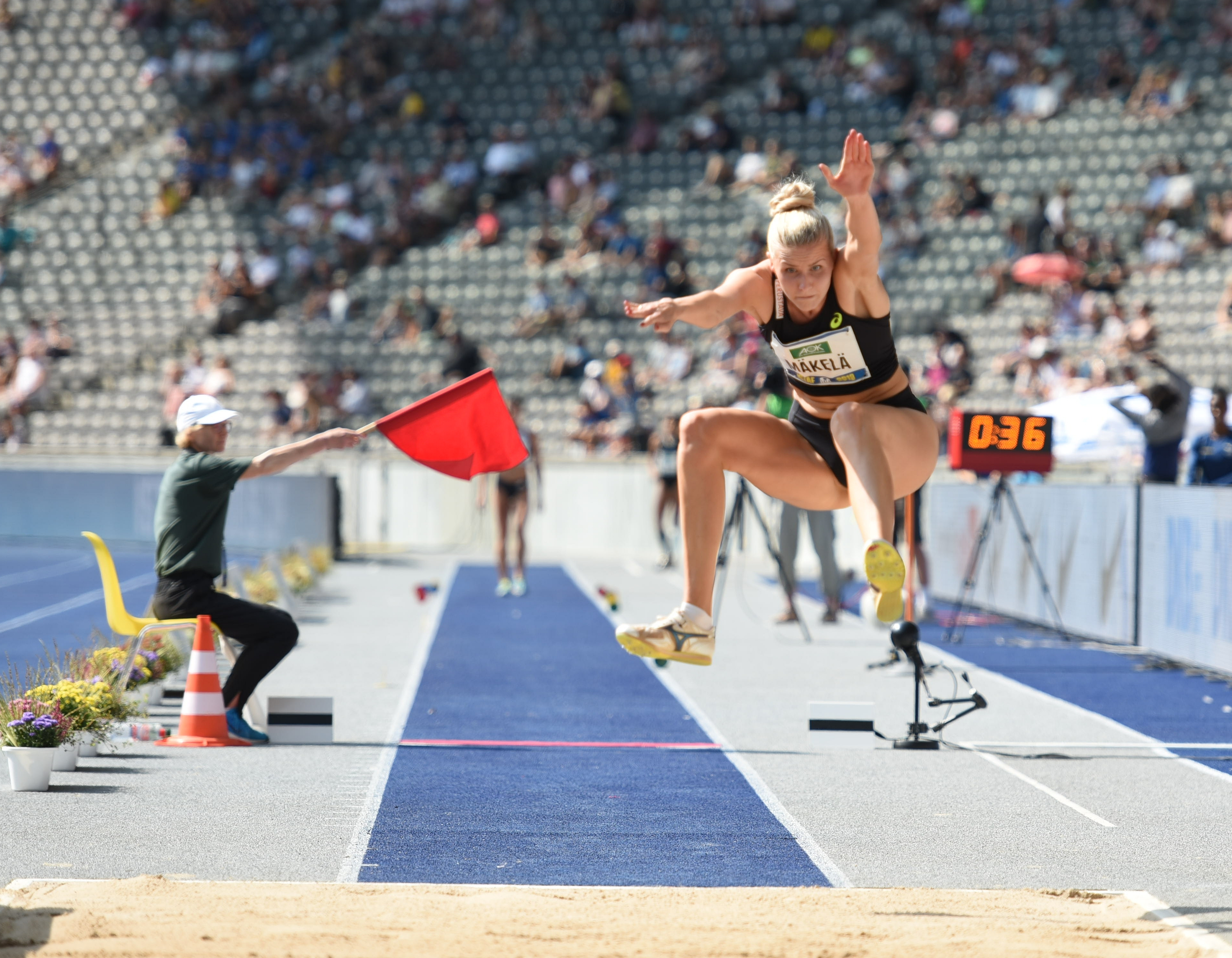
Mäkela in 2019

Meri Kristiina Mäkelä (born 20 November 1992) is a Finnish athlete whose specialty is the triple jump. She has competed in two Olympics and four World Athletics Championships, with the best result of 9th in 2022 . Her personal bests in the event are 14.64 m outdoors (achieved in 2022 in Munich, Germany) and 14.38 m indoors (2019, Gallur, Madrid, Spain).

== Competition record ==
Year	Competition	Venue	Position	Event	Notes
Representing Finland
2009	World Youth Championships	Brixen, Italy	6th	Triple jump	13.03 m
2009	European Youth Olympic Festival	Tampere, Finland	2nd	Triple jump	13.14 m
2010	World Junior Championships	Moncton, Canada	7th	Triple jump	13.26 m
2011	European Junior Championships	Tallinn, Estonia	2nd	Triple jump	13.67 m
2012	European Championships	Helsinki, Finland	–	Triple jump	NM
2015	European Indoor Championships	Prague, Czech Republic	8th	Triple jump	13.66 m
2015	World Championships	Beijing, China	13th (q)	Triple jump	13.83 m
2016	World Indoor Championships	Portland, United States	6th	Triple jump	14.07 m
2016	European Championships	Amsterdam, Netherlands	9th	Triple jump	13.95 m
2016	Olympic Games	Rio de Janeiro, Brazil	12th	Triple jump	13.95 m
2017	European Indoor Championships	Belgrade, Serbia	8th	Triple jump	13.73 m
2017	World Championships	London, United Kingdom	16th (q)	Triple jump	13.92 m
2018	World Indoor Championships	Birmingham, United Kingdom	16th	Triple jump	13.73 m
2018	European Championships	Berlin, Germany	9th	Triple jump	14.01 m
2019	European Indoor Championships	Glasgow, United Kingdom	6th	Triple jump	14.29 m
2019	World Championships	Doha, Qatar	12th	Triple jump	13.99 m
2021	European Indoor Championships	Toruń, Poland	6th	Triple jump	14.23 m
2021	Olympic Games	Tokyo, Japan	11th	Triple jump	14.17 m
2022	World Indoor Championships	Belgrade, Serbia	9th	Triple jump	14.14 m
2022	World Championships	Eugene, United States	9th	Triple jump	14.18 m
2022	European Championships	Munich, Germany	2nd	Triple jump	14.64 m
2023	World Championships	Budapest, Hungary	18th (q)	Triple jump	13.88 m
2024	World Indoor Championships	Glasgow, United Kingdom	12th	Triple jump	13.47 m
2024	European Championships	Rome, Italy	14th (q)	Triple jump	13.76 m
