= Tähti Alver =

Estonian athletics competitor

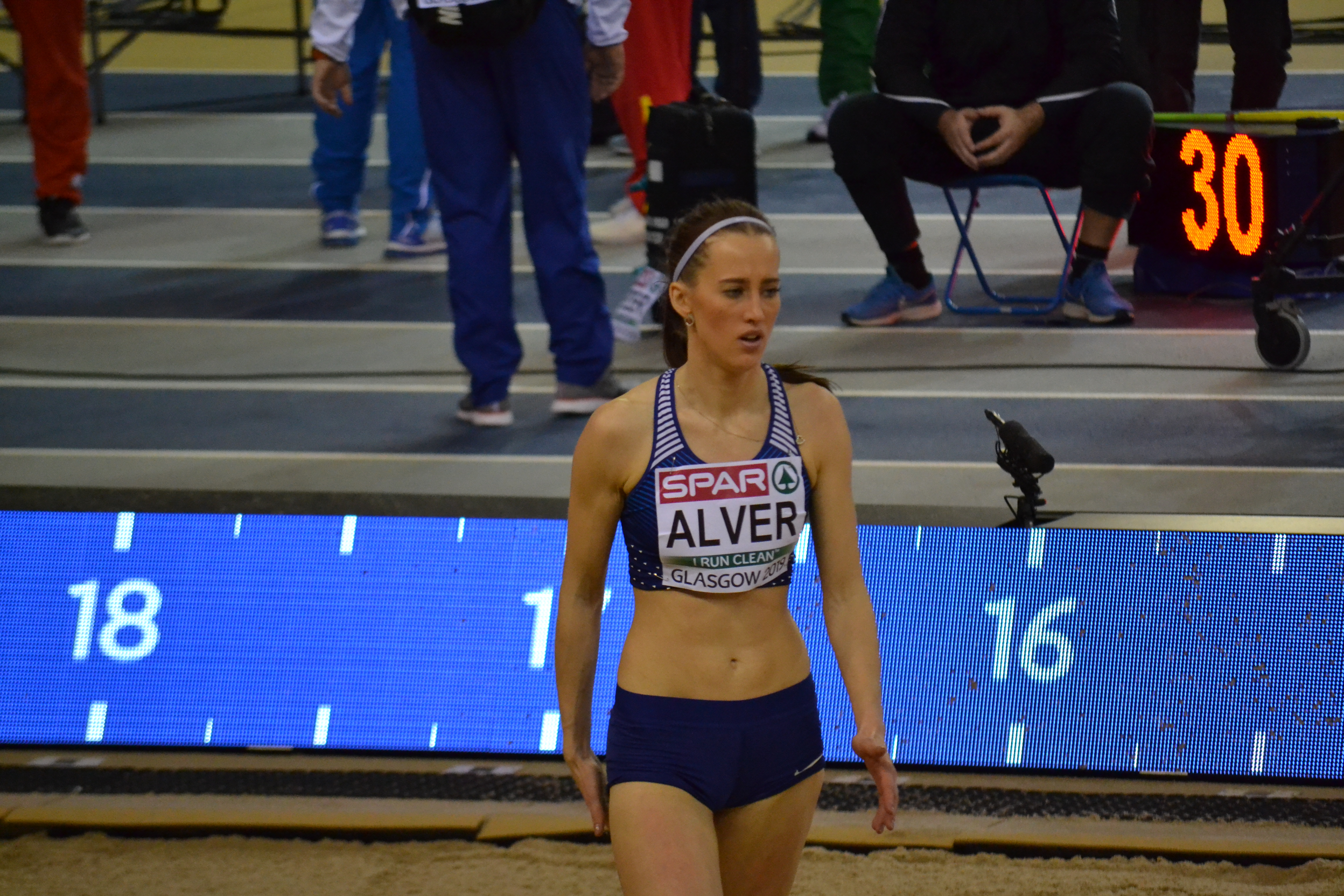
- Alver at the 2019 European Athletics Indoor Championships

Personal information
- Full name: Tähti Alver
- Born: 4 December 1994 (age 31) Tartu, Estonia
- Height: 1.77 m (5 ft 10 in)
- Weight: 59 kg (130 lb)

Sport
- Country: Estonia
- Sport: Track and field
- Event(s): Triple jump, Long jump
- Club: Nõmme SK
- Coached by: Epp Maasik

Achievements and titles
- Personal best(s): Triple jump: 14.05m, long jump: 6.54m

Tähti Alver (born 4 December 1994) is an Estonian triple jumper and long jumper.

Alver represented Estonia in the 2018 European Athletics Championships in Berlin where she finished 22nd with 13.76m. In the 2019 European Athletics Indoor Championships in Glasgow she finished 14th with 13.39m. Alver is a six-time Estonian champion - 4 times in triple jump and 2 times in long jump. She is holding all-time 4th place in triple jump and all-time 5th place in long jump in Estonia.

== Personal bests ==
- Triple jump: 14.05m (+0.9 m/s), 18 July 2018 (Tallinn)
- Triple jump (indoor): 13.75m, 10 February 2018 (Tallinn)
- Long jump: 6.54m (+1.9 m/s), 9 August 2020 (Tallinn)
- Long jump (indoor): 6.36m, 18 February 2018 (Tallinn)

== Major competition record ==
Year	Competition	Venue	Position	Event	Notes
Representing Estonia
2015	European Athletics U23 Championships	Tallinn, Estonia	26th (q)	Long jump	5.68 m
2015	European Athletics U23 Championships	Tallinn, Estonia	14th (q)	Triple jump	12.81 m
2018	European Championships	Berlin, Germany	22nd (q)	Triple jump	13.76 m
2019	European Indoor Championships	Glasgow, Scotland	14h (q)	Triple jump	13.39 m
