= Athletics at the 2015 Pan American Games – Women's triple jump =

Women's triple jump at the 2015 Pan American Games
- Venue: CIBC Pan Am and Parapan Am Athletics Stadium
- Dates: July 21
- Competitors: 16 from 11 nations
- Winning distance: 15.09

Medalists
Gold medal	Caterine Ibargüen	Colombia
Silver medal	Keila Costa	Brazil
Bronze medal	Yosiris Urrutia	Colombia

The women's triple jump competition of the athletics events at the 2015 Pan American Games took place on July 21 at the CIBC Pan Am and Parapan Am Athletics Stadium. The defending Pan American Games champion is Caterine Ibargüen of Colombia.

== Records ==
Prior to this competition, the existing world and Pan American Games records were as follows:

World record	Inessa Kravets (UKR)	15.50	Gothenburg, Sweden	August 10, 1995
Pan American Games record	Caterine Ibargüen (COL)	14.92	Guadalajara, Mexico	October 28, 2011

== Qualification ==
Each National Olympic Committee (NOC) was able to enter up to two entrants providing they had met the minimum standard (13.08) in the qualifying period (January 1, 2014 to June 28, 2015).

== Schedule ==
Date	Time	Round
July 21, 2015	18:05	Final

== Results ==
All results shown are in meters.

KEY:	q	Best non-qualifiers	Q	Qualified	NR	National record	PB	Personal best	SB	Seasonal best	DQ	Disqualified

=== Final ===
Rank	Name	Nationality	#1	#2	#3	#4	#5	#6	Mark	Wind	Notes
1st place, gold medalist(s)	Caterine Ibargüen	Colombia	14.37	14.38	14.74	14.59	14.88	15.08	15.08	+2.3	
2nd place, silver medalist(s)	Keila Costa	Brazil	13.59	14.08	14.19	14.21	14.50	x	14.50	+2.9	
3rd place, bronze medalist(s)	Yosiris Urrutia	Colombia	13.62	14.08	13.74	14.12	14.38	14.22	14.38	+3.3	SB
4	Yulimar Rojas	Venezuela	x	14.20 NR	x	14.10	14.35	14.37	14.37	+2.2	14.20 NR (+2.0)
5	Dailenys Alcántara	Cuba	14.04	x	13.98	14.02	13.94	x	14.04	+3.5	
6	Liadagmis Povea	Cuba	13.90	13.66	13.97	13.96	13.71	13.75	13.97	+2.6	
7	Christina Epps	United States	13.85	x	x	x	13.48	x	13.85	+1.5	
8	Ayanna Alexander	Trinidad and Tobago	13.55	x	13.83	13.00	12.14	13.52	13.83	+1.3	
9	Shanieka Thomas	Jamaica	11.62	13.74	13.55				13.74	+2.4	
10	Tamara Myers	Bahamas	13.57	12.84	13.22				13.57	+2.3	
11	Nubia Soares	Brazil	x	x	13.57				13.57	+3.1	
12	Thea LaFond	Dominica	13.35	13.05	12.14				13.35	+1.5	NR
13	April Sinkler	United States	13.11	12.97	13.16				13.16	+3.5	
14	Caroline Ehrhardt	Canada	13.08	x	x				13.08	+1.4	
15	Alicia Smith	Canada	12.28	12.71	11.21				12.71	+3.0	
16	Pascale Delaunay	Haiti	12.19	11.29	12.35				12.35	+3.0	
