= Caterine Ibargüen =

Colombian athlete competing in high jump, long jump and triple jump

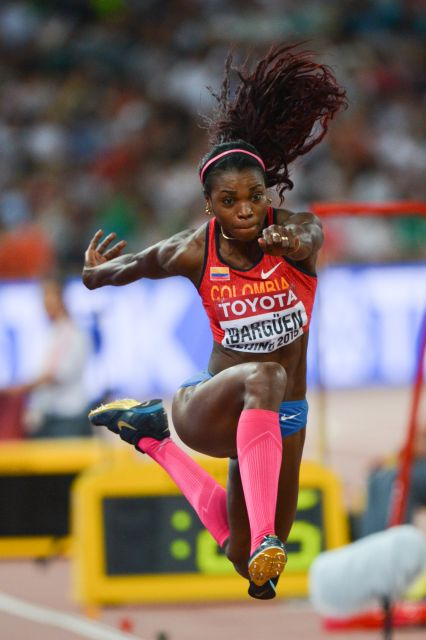
- Ibargüen at the 2015 World Championships

Personal information
- Full name: Caterine Ibargüen Mena
- Nationality: Colombian
- Born: 12 February 1984 (age 42) Apartadó, Antioquia, Colombia
- Height: 1.85 m (6 ft 1 in)
- Weight: 65 kg (143 lb)

Sport
- Country: Colombia
- Sport: Athletics
- Events: High jump; Long jump; Triple jump; Heptathlon
- Coached by: Ubaldo Duany
- Retired: 2021

Achievements and titles
- Personal bests: High jump: 1.93 (2005); Long jump: 6.93 (2018); Triple jump: 15.31 NR (2014); Heptathlon: 5742 (2009)
Medal record
Women's athletics
Representing Colombia
Event	1st	2nd	3rd
Olympic Games	1	1	0
World Championships	2	1	2
Continental Cup	3	0	0
Pan American Games	2	0	1
CAC Games	3	4	1
Bolivarian Games	5	2	0
Total	16	8	4
Olympic Games
Gold medal – first place	2016 Rio de Janeiro	Triple jump
Silver medal – second place	2012 London	Triple jump
World Championships
Gold medal – first place	2013 Moscow	Triple jump
Gold medal – first place	2015 Beijing	Triple jump
Silver medal – second place	2017 London	Triple jump
Bronze medal – third place	2011 Daegu	Triple jump
Bronze medal – third place	2019 Doha	Triple jump
Pan American Games
Gold medal – first place	2011 Guadalajara	Triple jump
Gold medal – first place	2015 Toronto	Triple jump
Bronze medal – third place	2011 Guadalajara	Long jump
Central American and Caribbean Games
Gold medal – first place	2014 Veracruz	Triple jump
Gold medal – first place	2018 Barranquilla	Long jump
Gold medal – first place	2018 Barranquilla	Triple jump
Silver medal – second place	2002 San Salvador	Triple jump
Silver medal – second place	2006 Cartagena	High jump
Silver medal – second place	2006 Cartagena	Long jump
Silver medal – second place	2010 Mayagüez	Triple jump
Bronze medal – third place	2002 San Salvador	High jump
Bolivarian Games
Gold medal – first place	2001 Ambato	High jump
Gold medal – first place	2005 Armenia-Pereira	High jump
Gold medal – first place	2005 Armenia-Pereira	Long jump
Gold medal – first place	2009 Sucre	High jump
Gold medal – first place	2009 Sucre	Long jump
Silver medal – second place	2005 Armenia-Pereira	Triple jump
Silver medal – second place	2009 Sucre	Triple jump
CAC Junior Championships (U20)
Silver medal – second place	2002 Bridgetown	High jump
Bronze medal – third place	2002 Bridgetown	Triple jump
Representing Americas
Continental Cup
Gold medal – first place	2014 Marrakesh	Triple jump
Gold medal – first place	2018 Ostrava	Long jump
Gold medal – first place	2018 Ostrava	Triple jump

Caterine Ibargüen Mena (Note: In this Spanish name, the first or paternal surname is Ibargüen and the second or maternal family name is Mena.) ODB (born 12 February 1984) is a retired Colombian athlete competing in high jump, long jump and triple jump. Her notable achievements include a gold medal at the 2016 Summer Olympics, silver medal in the 2012 Summer Olympics, two gold medals in the World Championships in Athletics, and two gold medals in the 2011 Pan American Games and 2015 Pan American Games.

== Biography ==
Caterine was born in the Urabá region of Antioquia, where she was raised by her grandmother after her parents separated because of the armed conflict in Colombia. Her father left for Venezuela and her mother moved to Turbo, Colombia. Caterine first played volleyball, and Wilder Zapata, her coach, noticed her skill and suggested she play in Medellín, which had the high-profile Atanasio Girardot Sports Complex as a venue for national and international games. There, she began her training in 1996 with the Cuban coach Jorge Luis Alfaro, specializing in the high jump.

Her personal best in the high jump is 1.93 metres, achieved on 22 July 2005 in Cali, which stands as the current Colombian record. She competed at the 2004 Olympic Games in Athens, where she jumped 1.85 m in the qualifying round. She held the South American record in the triple jump with 15.31 m from July 2014 until September 2019. That jump remained the best jump since the Olympics in August 2008 until Yulimar Rojas achieved a mark of 15.41 m at the Jaén Paraíso Interior Meeting. On 1 September 2011, she obtained the bronze medal at the IAAF World Championships in Daegu with a 14.84 m performance. Based in Puerto Rico. Coached by Ubaldo Duany, former Cuban Long Jumper (8.32 m PB from 1986). On 5 August, she won a silver medal at the London 2012 Olympics in the triple jump competition with a 14.80 m jump on her last attempt. On 15 August 2013, she won IAAF World Championships in Moscow in the triple jump competition with a 14.85 m jump on her second attempt.

Caterine Ibargüen announced her retirement in August 2021.

== Personal bests ==
Outdoor

- 200 m: 24.96 s (wind: -1.2 m/s) – San Germán, 4 December 2009
- 800 m: 2:35.35 min – San Germán, 4 December 2010
- 100 m hurdles: 14.09 s (wind: +0.0 m/s) – Mayagüez, 19 February 2011
- High jump: 1.93 m – Cali, 22 July 2005
- Long jump: 6.93 m (wind: +0.8 m/s) – Ostrava, 9 September 2018
- Triple jump: 15.31 m (wind: 0.0 m/s) – Monaco, 18 July 2014
- Shot put: 13.79 m – Carolina, 20 March 2010
- Javelin throw: 37.72 m – San Germán, 4 December 2010
- Heptathlon: 5742 pts – San Germán, 5 December 2009

Indoor

- High jump: 1.81 m – Moscow, 11 March 2006

== International competitions ==
Representing Colombia
Year	Competition	Venue	Position	Event	Notes
1999	South American Championships	Bogotá, Colombia	3rd	High jump	1.76 m A
1999	World Youth Championships	Bydgoszcz, Poland	15th (q)	High jump	1.65 m
1999	South American Junior Championships	Concepción, Chile	2nd	High jump	1.73 m
2001	South American Junior Championships	Santa Fe, Argentina	1st	High jump	1.77 m
2001	South American Junior Championships	Santa Fe, Argentina	2nd	Long jump	5.87 m
2001	South American Junior Championships	Santa Fe, Argentina	3rd	Triple jump	12.65 m
2001	South American Junior Championships	Santa Fe, Argentina	2nd	4 × 100 m	45.92 s
2001	Pan American Junior Championships	Santa Fe, Argentina	2nd	High jump	1.77 m
2001	Pan American Junior Championships	Santa Fe, Argentina	6th	Long jump	5.70 m
2001	Pan American Junior Championships	Santa Fe, Argentina	4th	Triple jump	12.90 m
2001	Pan American Junior Championships	Santa Fe, Argentina	3rd	4 × 100 m	46.89 s
2001	Bolivarian Games	Ambato, Ecuador	1st	High jump	1.79 m A
2002	World Junior Championships	Kingston, Jamaica	20th (q)	Triple jump	12.69 m (+0.6 m/s)
2002	Central American and Caribbean; Junior Championships (U-20)	Bridgetown, Barbados	2nd	High jump	1.79 m
2002	Central American and Caribbean; Junior Championships (U-20)	Bridgetown, Barbados	3rd	Triple jump	13.01 m (−1.3 m/s)
2002	Central American and Caribbean Games	San Salvador, El Salvador	3rd	High jump	1.79 m
2002	Central American and Caribbean Games	San Salvador, El Salvador	2nd	Triple jump	13.17 m (−1.4 m/s)
2003	South American Junior Championships	Guayaquil, Ecuador	1st	High jump	1.80 m
2003	South American Junior Championships	Guayaquil, Ecuador	1st	Triple jump	13.05 m (+2.0 m/s)
2003	South American Championships	Barquisimeto, Venezuela	4th	High jump	1.79 m
2003	South American Championships	Barquisimeto, Venezuela	2nd	Long jump	6.04 m (−0.4 m/s)
2003	South American Championships	Barquisimeto, Venezuela	3rd	Triple jump	13.07 m (−0.1 m/s)
2003	Pan American Junior Championships	Bridgetown, Barbados	4th	High jump	1.81 m
2003	Pan American Junior Championships	Bridgetown, Barbados	4th	Triple jump	12.64 m (−0.8 m/s)
2004	South American Under-23 Championships	Barquisimeto, Venezuela	1st	High jump	1.91 m
2004	South American Under-23 Championships	Barquisimeto, Venezuela	2nd	Long jump	6.05 m (+0.9 m/s)
2004	Ibero-American Championships	Huelva, Spain	3rd	High jump	1.88 m
2004	Olympic Games	Athens, Greece	16th (q)	High jump	1.85 m
2005	South American Championships	Cali, Colombia	1st	High jump	1.93 m
2005	South American Championships	Cali, Colombia	3rd	Long jump	6.30 m (−3.0 m/s)
2005	South American Championships	Cali, Colombia	3rd	Triple jump	13.59 m (+1.3 m/s)
2005	World Championships	Helsinki, Finland	23rd (q)	High jump	1.84 m
2005	Bolivarian Games	Armenia, Colombia	1st	High jump	1.91 m GR A
2005	Bolivarian Games	Armenia, Colombia	1st	Long jump	6.54 m (+0.7 m/s) GR A
2005	Bolivarian Games	Armenia, Colombia	2nd	Triple jump	13.64 m (+1.9 m/s) A
2006	World Indoor Championships	Moscow, Russia	17th (q)	High jump	1.81 m
2006	Central American and Caribbean Games	Cartagena, Colombia	2nd	High jump	1.88 m
2006	Central American and Caribbean Games	Cartagena, Colombia	2nd	Long jump	6.36 m (+0.5 m/s)
2006	South American Championships	Tunja, Colombia	1st	High jump	1.90 m
2006	South American Championships	Tunja, Colombia	2nd	Long jump	6.51 m A w (+3.8 m/s)
2006	South American Championships	Tunja, Colombia	2nd	Triple jump	13.91 m A (+0.9 m/s)
2006	South American Under-23 Championships / South American Games	Buenos Aires, Argentina	2nd	High jump	1.85 m
2006	South American Under-23 Championships / South American Games	Buenos Aires, Argentina	1st	Long jump	6.32 m (+1.1 m/s)
2006	South American Under-23 Championships / South American Games	Buenos Aires, Argentina	2nd	Triple jump	13.26 m w (+2.5 m/s)
2007	ALBA Games	Caracas, Venezuela	1st	High jump	1.85 m
2007	Pan American Games	Rio de Janeiro, Brazil	4th	High jump	1.87 m
2007	South American Championships	São Paulo, Brazil	1st	High jump	1.84 m
2007	South American Championships	São Paulo, Brazil	3rd	Long jump	6.18 m (+0.9 m/s)
2008	Ibero-American Championships	Iquique, Chile	2nd	High jump	1.85 m
2008	Central American and Caribbean Championships	Cali, Colombia	2nd	High jump	1.88 m
2008	Central American and Caribbean Championships	Cali, Colombia	6th	Triple jump	13.04 m (−2.0 m/s)
2009	South American Championships	Lima, Peru	1st	High jump	1.88 m A
2009	South American Championships	Lima, Peru	1st	Triple jump	13.93 m A (+0.5 m/s)
2009	World Championships	Berlin, Germany	28th (q)	High jump	1.85 m
2009	Bolivarian Games	Sucre, Bolivia	1st	High jump	1.80 m A
2009	Bolivarian Games	Sucre, Bolivia	1st	Long jump	6.32 m A (−0.4 m/s)
2009	Bolivarian Games	Sucre, Bolivia	2nd	Triple jump	13.96 m A (−0.3 m/s)
2010	Ibero-American Championships	San Fernando, Spain	2nd	Triple jump	14.29 m (+2.0 m/s)
2010	Central American and Caribbean Games	Mayagüez, Puerto Rico	4th	Long jump	6.29 m (−0.5 m/s)
2010	Central American and Caribbean Games	Mayagüez, Puerto Rico	2nd	Triple jump	14.10 m (+0.8 m/s)
2011	South American Championships	Buenos Aires, Argentina	3rd	Long jump	6.45 m (−0.5 m/s)
2011	South American Championships	Buenos Aires, Argentina	1st	Triple jump	14.59 m w (+2.2 m/s)
2011	World Championships	Daegu, South Korea	3rd	Triple jump	14.84 m (+0.4 m/s)
2011	Pan American Games	Guadalajara, Mexico	3rd	Long jump	6.63 m (+1.6 m/s) NR
2011	Pan American Games	Guadalajara, Mexico	1st	Triple jump	14.92 m (+0.1 m/s)
2012	Olympic Games	London, United Kingdom	2nd	Triple jump	14.80 m (+0.4 m/s)
2013	World Championships	Moscow, Russia	1st	Triple jump	14.85 m (+0.4 m/s)
2014	Continental Cup	Marrakesh, Morocco	1st	Triple jump	14.52 m (−0.5 m/s)
2014	Central American and Caribbean Games	Xalapa, Mexico	1st	Triple jump	14.57 m A (−0.4 m/s)
2015	Pan American Games	Toronto, Canada	1st	Triple jump	15.08 m (w)
2015	World Championships	Beijing, China	1st	Triple jump	14.90 m
2016	Olympic Games	Rio de Janeiro, Brazil	1st	Triple jump	15.17 m
2017	World Championships	London, United Kingdom	2nd	Triple jump	14.89 m
2018	Central American and Caribbean Games	Barranquilla, Colombia	1st	Long jump	6.83 m (w)
2018	Central American and Caribbean Games	Barranquilla, Colombia	1st	Triple jump	14.92 m
2018	Continental Cup	Ostrava, Czech Republic	1st	Long jump	6.93 m NR
2018	Continental Cup	Ostrava, Czech Republic	1st	Triple jump	14.76 m
2019	Pan American Games	Lima, Peru	5th	Long jump	6.54 m
2019	World Championships	Doha, Qatar	3rd	Triple jump	14.73 m
2021	Olympic Games	Tokyo, Japan	10th	Triple jump	14.25 m

== Honours ==
- Colombia:
  - Grand Cross of the National Order of Merit (12 December 2018)

== Awards ==
- 2018 IAAF Female athlete of the year award

== Notes ==
Olympic Games
Preceded by Pedro Causil	Flagbearer for Colombia; Tokyo 2020 with Yuberjen Martínez	Succeeded by Laura Gómez; Carlos Andres Quintana
