= Rouguy Diallo =

French athlete (born 1995)

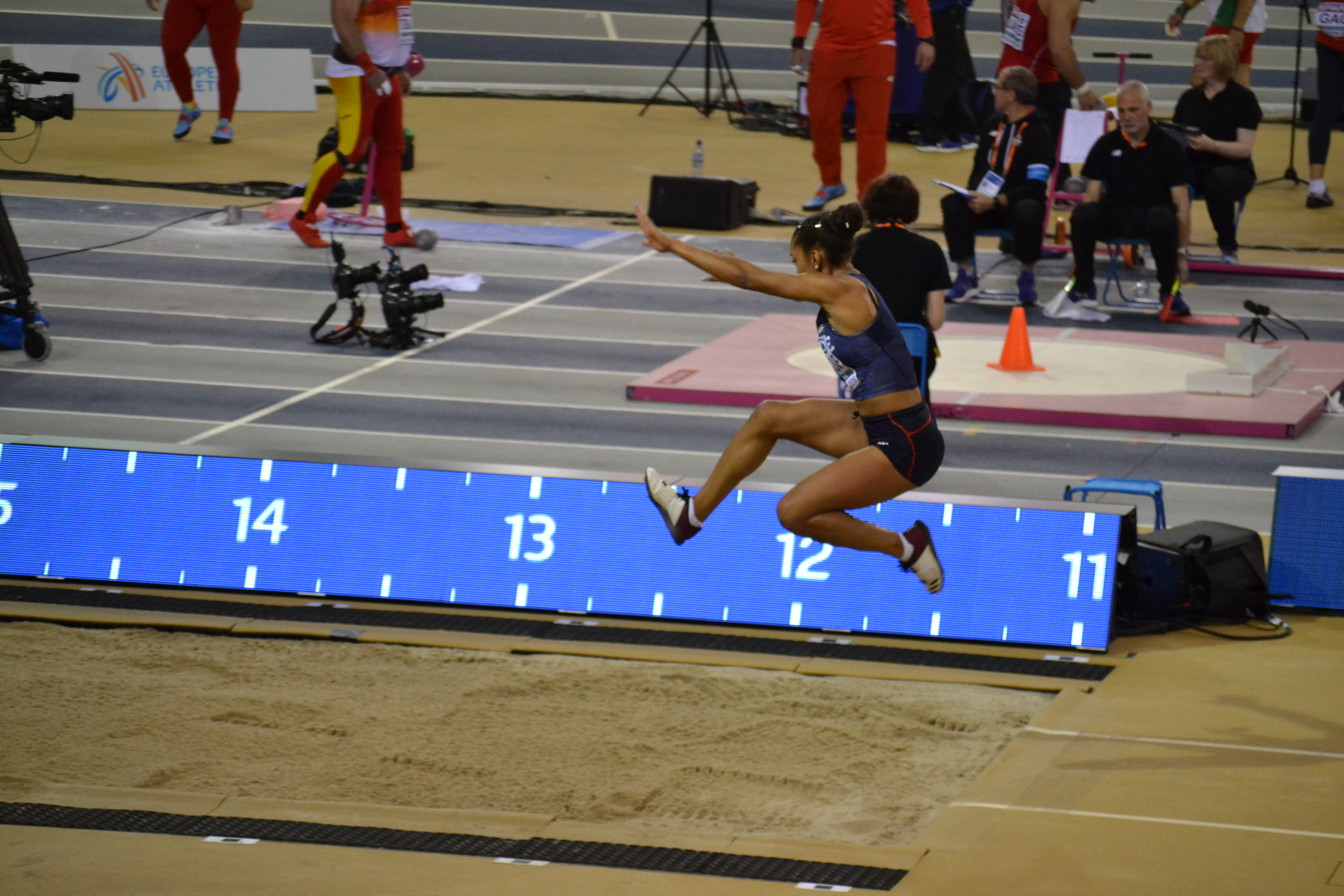
- Diallo at the 2019 European Indoor Championships

Personal information
- Born: 5 February 1995 (age 31) Nice, France
- Height: 168 cm (5 ft 6 in)
- Weight: 56 kg (123 lb)

Sport
- Country: France
- Sport: Athletics
- Events: Triple jump, long jump, 100 m hurdles
- Club: Nice Côte d'Azur Athlétisme

Achievements and titles
- Personal bests: Triple jump: 14.44 m (Eugene, 2014); 100 m hurdles: 13.98 s (Dijon, 2012)
Medal record
Women's athletics
Representing France
World Junior Championships
Gold medal – first place	2014 Oregon	Triple jump

Rouguy Diallo (French pronunciation: [ʁu.ɡi dja.lo]; born 5 February 1995) is a French athlete who specialises in the triple jump.

== Career ==
Diallo was born in Nice, and began triple jumping in 2006. She set a new French national junior record at an event in Argentan in 2014, with an attempt of 13.74 m.

Diallo won her first major medal at the 2014 World Junior Championships in Athletics in Eugene, Oregon. She broke her own national junior record twice during the event, landing a 14.24 m jump in her first attempt with a 3.2 m/s headwind. After a foul in the second round, she jumped 14.44 m with help from a 3.3 m/s headwind, an attempt that was enough to win her the gold medal. However, these two attempts were not accepted as national junior records as there was too much headwind when they were made. Her fourth attempt of 14.20 was accepted as a national junior record, and also became the 15th longest attempt of all time in the junior women's triple jump. She became the third French triple jumper to win a world junior title for France after Benjamin Compaoré in 2006 and Teddy Tamgho in 2008.

== Personal life ==
Diallo is mentored by fellow French triple jumper Teddy Tamgho, who is the current triple jump world indoor record holder at 17.92 m. She currently trains at the Nice Côte d'Azur Athlétisme club in Nice.
