= Iryna Vaskouskaya =

Belarusian triple jumper

Personal information
- Nationality: Belarusian
- Born: 2 April 1991 (age 34)
- Height: 1.79 m (5 ft 10 1/2 in)
- Weight: 65 kg (143 lb)

Sport
- Country: Belarus
- Sport: Track and field
- Event: Triple jump

Iryna Leanidauna Vaskouskaya (Belarusian: Ірына Леанідаўна Васькоўская; born 2 April 1991) is a Belarusian athlete who specialises in the triple jump. She has qualified for 2016 Summer Olympics.

== Personal bests ==
=== Outdoor ===
Event	Record	Wind	Venue	Date
Triple jump	14.19	+1.9	Grodno	25 June 2016

=== Indoor ===
Event	Record	Venue	Date
Triple jump	14.23	Mogilev	21 February 2016
