= Hanna Knyazyeva-Minenko =

Israeli-Ukrainian triple and long jumper

Hanna Minenko
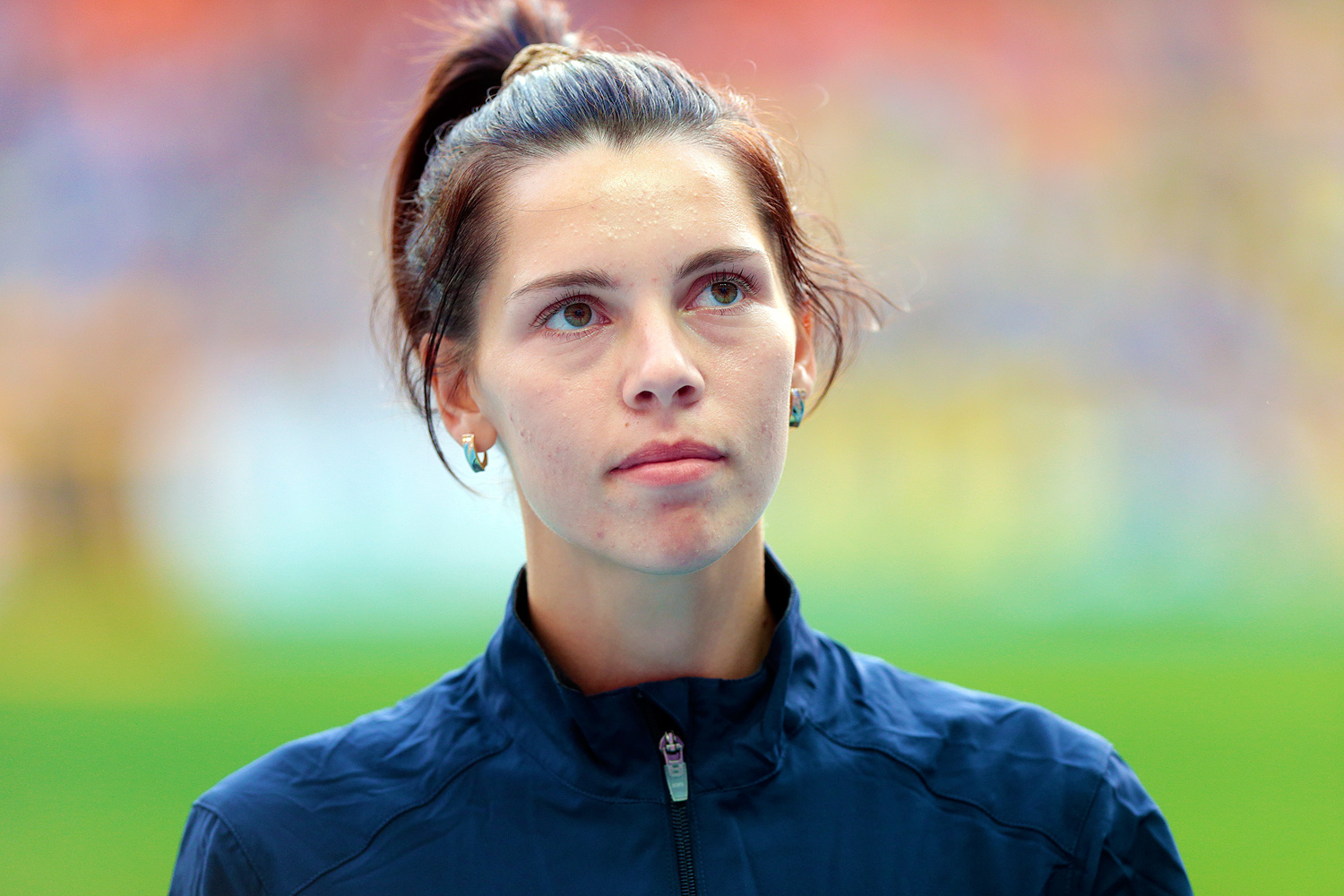
- Knyazyeva-Minenko won the bronze medal at the 2022 European Athletics Championships in Munich

Personal information
- Native name: Ганна Вікторівна Князєва-Міненко
- Full name: Hanna Viktorivna Kniazieva-Minenko
- Nationality: Israeli
- Born: Anna Viktorivna Kniazieva (Aнна Вікторівна Князєва); 25 September 1989 (age 37) Pereiaslav-Khmelnytskyi, Ukrainian SSR, Soviet Union
- Education: Master of Arts (MA) in Communication and Media Studies, [Reichman University], [2016-2018]
- Height: 1.79 m (5 ft 10 in)
- Weight: 63 kg (139 lb)
- Spouse: Anatoly Minenko (m. 2012)

Sport
- Country: Ukraine (2005–2012); Israel (2013–present)
- Sport: Track and Field
- Events: Triple jump, Long jump
- Club: Maccabi Haifa
- Coached by: Anatoliy Holubtsov, Yuriy Horbachenko, Alex Merman, Rogel Nachum

Achievements and titles
- Olympic finals: Triple Jump: 2012, 2016, 2020
- National finals: First Place and National Record Holder, Israel (triple jump and long jump)
- Personal bests: triple jump – 14.78 m (2015); triple jump indoor – 14.49 m (2015); long jump – 6.52 m (2014); long jump indoor – 6.26 m (2012)
Medal record
Representing Israel
World Championships
Silver medal – second place	2015 Beijing	Triple jump
European Championships
Silver medal – second place	2016 Amsterdam	Triple jump
Bronze medal – third place	2022 Munich	Triple jump
European Indoor Championships
Bronze medal – third place	2015 Praha	Triple jump
European Games
Bronze medal – third place	2015 Baku	Mixed Team
Representing Ukraine
European Youth Olympic Festival
Silver medal – second place	2005 Lignano Sabbiadoro	Triple jump

Hanna Viktorivna Knyazyeva-Minenko, née Knyazyeva, (Ukrainian: Ганна Вікторівна Князєва-Міненко; Hebrew: חנה קנייזבה-מיננקו; born 25 September 1989) is a former Ukrainian and a current Israeli triple jumper and long jumper.

She established a personal best in August 2015 of 14.78 meters (m) in the triple jump while winning the silver medal at the 2015 World Championships in Athletics. She competed for her native Ukraine at the 2012 Summer Olympics in the women's triple jump event, coming in fourth with a jump of 14.56 m.

She immigrated to Israel and became an Israeli citizen in early 2013 on account of marriage to an Israeli citizen, and has represented Israel since then. At the 77th Israeli Athletics Championships in early July 2013, Knyazyeva-Minenko established a new Israeli record in winning the women's triple jump with a distance of 14.50 m. At the Sainsbury's Anniversary Games Diamond League competition in London later that month, she won a bronze medal with a distance of 14.29 m in the triple jump. In September 2013 at the International Association of Athletics Federations (IAAF) World Challenge in Zagreb, Croatia, she jumped 14.38 m and won a silver medal in the triple jump.

At the 78th Israel national championships in 2014, Knyazyeva-Minenko won a gold medal in the long jump while setting a new Israeli record and personal best with a distance of 6.52 m. She won a bronze medal in the triple jump at the European Athletics Indoor Championships in Prague in March 2015, becoming the first Israeli woman to win a track and field medal at a major European championship. She jumped a distance of 14.49 m, setting a new Israeli national indoor record. Competing for Israel at the 2015 European Games in June 2015, she won the triple jump competition that formed part of the Athletics event at the 2015 European Games, though no individual medal was awarded to her as the competition was a team event only; she also won a bronze medal for the team event. Representing Israel at the 2015 World Championships in Athletics in Beijing, China, in August 2015, she won the silver medal in the triple jump, setting a new Israeli record of 14.78 meters. Knyazyeva-Minenko represented Israel at the 2016 Summer Olympics in the triple jump, coming in fifth.

== Early and personal life ==
Anna Victorivna Knyazyeva (Анна Вікторівна Князєва) was born in 1989 in Pereiaslav-Khmelnytskyi, Ukrainian SSR. She began training as an athlete when she was eight years old.

She married Soviet Kazakh-born Israeli former decathlon champion Anatoly Minenko. They reside in Israel.

== Athletic career ==
=== For Ukraine ===
Knyazyeva won the silver medal in the triple jump at the 2007 European Athletics Junior Championships. On 10 July 2008, she came in 4th in the triple jump at the 12th IAAF World Junior Championships in Athletics in Bydgoszcz, Poland, with a distance of 13.61 m. She established a personal best in June 2012 of 14.71 m in the triple jump, 79 centimeters short of the world record, when she was 22 years old.

Knyazyeva placed fourth for Ukraine in the women's triple jump event at the 2012 Summer Olympics, with a best jump of 14.56 meters. She trailed Olga Rypakova of Kazakhstan, Caterine Ibargüen of Colombia, and Olha Saladukha of Ukraine.

=== For Israel ===
Knyazyeva-Minenko immigrated to Israel and became an Israeli citizen, on account of marriage to an Israeli citizen. Her coach is Israeli Alex Merman, who formerly coached Israeli high jumper Konstantin Matusevich, and her club is Maccabi Haifa.

At the 77th Israeli Athletics Championships in early July 2013, she established a new Israeli record in winning the women's triple jump with a distance of 14.50 m. Knyazyeva-Minenko won a silver medal at the 2013 IAAF Diamond League competition in Paris, jumping 14.58 m in the triple jump. At the Sainsbury's Anniversary Games Diamond League competition in London on 26 July 2013, she won a bronze medal in the triple jump with a distance of 14.29 m, behind Jamaican Kimberly Williams and Russian Ekaterina Koneva.

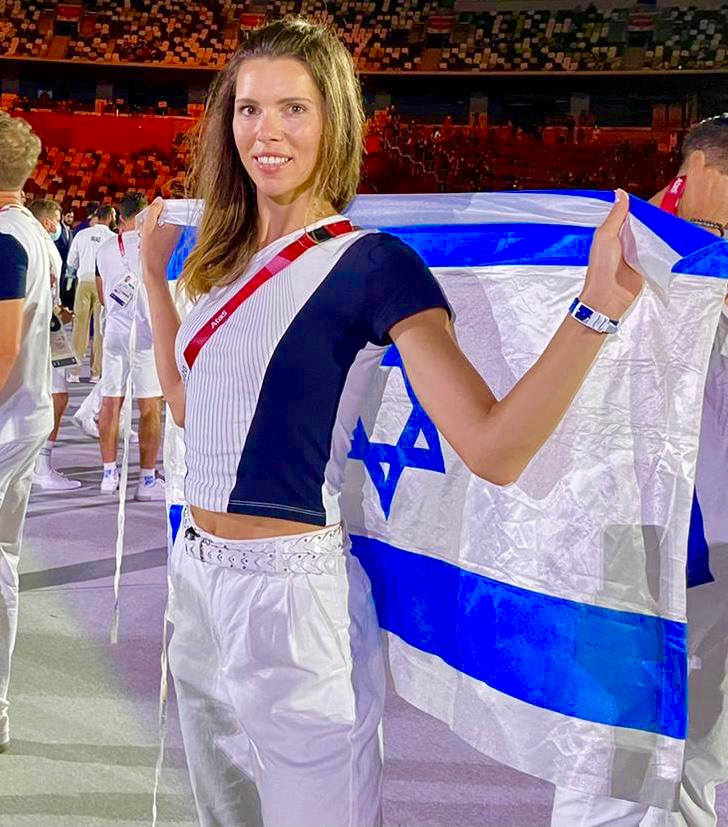
Tokyo Olympic Games, 2021

At the 14th IAAF World Championships in Athletics at Luzhniki Stadium in Moscow on 15 August 2013, at age 23 in her first major event representing Israel, Knyazyeva-Minenko came in 6th in the triple jump, with a distance of 14.33 m, after posting a 14.46 m and coming in third in the qualifying round. She was the first Israeli to reach a World Championships final since Israeli Alex Averbukh in the pole vault, in 2007. She observed: "I'm still young, and I’ve got many more years to represent [Israel] and bring it honor."

On 3 September 2013 at the International Association of Athletics Federations (IAAF) World Challenge in Zagreb, Croatia, she jumped 14.38 m in the triple jump and won a silver medal, behind winner Olha Saladuha of Ukraine. In 2013, she held a women's triple jump ranking of No. 4 in the Diamond League series.

In 2014 Knyazyeva-Minenko had an operation to repair an injured Achilles tendon, and missed competing for most of the year as a result. However, at the 78th Israel national championships at Hadar Yosef Stadium in Tel Aviv in 2014, she won a gold medal in the long jump while setting a new Israeli record with a distance of 6.52 m. The distance was a new personal best for the event, and eclipsed by six centimeters Sigal Gonen's previous Israeli record, which had stood for 28 years since 1986.

Knyazyeva-Minenko won a bronze medal at the European Athletics Indoor Championships in Prague in March 2015, competing for Israel in the triple jump. She jumped a distance of 14.49 meters (47.5 feet), setting a new Israeli national indoor record for the second day in a row, improving on her prior day's national record jump in the qualifiers by nine centimeters. In winning the medal, she became the first Israeli woman to win a track and field medal at a major European championship, and became the first Israeli to win a medal at the European Indoor Championships since Alex Averbukh won a gold medal in the pole vault at the 2000 European Indoor Championships. She noted: "My best jump (14.49 meters) would have won me the gold medal at the last World Championship." Russia's Ekaterina Koneva won the gold medal, and Bulgaria's Gabriela Petrova won the silver medal.

At the IAAF Diamond League Bislett Games in Oslo, Norway, on 11 June 2015 she came in fifth in the triple jump, at 14.22 m. Competing for Israel at the 2015 European Games on 21 June 2015, she won the triple jump portion of the Team Athletics event with a distance of 14.41 m; she also won a bronze medal for the team event.

She represented Israel at the 2015 World Championships in Athletics in Beijing, China, in August 2015. She won the silver medal in the triple jump, setting a new Israeli record of 14.78 meters.

Knyazyeva-Minenko represented Israel at the 2016 Summer Olympics in the triple jump, at the age of 26. She jumped 14.68 m in the final, for fifth place, six centimeters behind the bronze medalist. Her fifth-place finish matched the best-ever finish for an Israeli in an Olympic athletics competition, established first by high jumper Konstantin Matusevich, at the 2000 Olympics.

In December 2024, Knyazyeva-Minenko announced her retirement from competitive sports.

== Competition record ==
Year	Competition	Venue	Position	Event	Notes
Representing Ukraine
2007	European Junior Championships	Hengelo, Netherlands	2nd	Triple jump	13.85 m
2008	World Junior Championships	Bydgoszcz, Poland	4th	Triple jump	13.61 m (wind: -0.2 m/s)
2011	European U23 Championships	Ostrava, Czech Republic	20th (q)	Long jump	5.85 m (wind: -0.1 m/s)
2011	European U23 Championships	Ostrava, Czech Republic	5th	Triple jump	13.61 m (wind: +1.1 m/s)
2011	Universiade	Shenzhen, China	20th (q)	Long jump	5.94 m
2011	Universiade	Shenzhen, China	4th	Triple jump	14.15 m
2012	World Indoor Championships	Istanbul, Turkey	21st (q)	Triple jump	13.65 m
2012	Olympic Games	London, England	4th	Triple jump	14.56 m
Representing Israel
2013	London Grand Prix	London, England	3rd	Triple jump	14.29 m
2013	World Championships	Moscow, Russia	6th	Triple jump	14.33 m
2015	European Indoor Championships	Prague, Czech Republic	3rd	Triple jump	14.49 m
2015	European Games	Baku, Azerbaijan	1st	Triple jump	14.41 m
2015	World Championships	Beijing, China	2nd	Triple jump	14.78 m
2016	European Championships	Amsterdam, Netherlands	2nd	Triple jump	14.51 m
2016	Olympic Games	Rio de Janeiro, Brazil	5th	Triple jump	14.68 m
2017	World Championships	London, United Kingdom	4th	Triple jump	14.42 m
2018	European Championships	Berlin, Germany	5th	Triple jump	14.37 m
2021	European Indoor Championships	Toruń, Poland	10th (q)	Triple jump	13.73 m
2021	Olympic Games	Tokyo, Japan	6th	Triple jump	14.60 m
2022	World Indoor Championships	Belgrade, Serbia	14th	Triple jump	13.83 m
2022	World Championships	Eugene, United States	15th (q)	Triple jump	14.11 m
2022	European Championships	Munich, Germany	3rd	Triple jump	14.45 m
2024	European Championships	Rome, Italy	–	Triple jump	NM

== See also ==
- List of Israeli records in athletics

Olympic Games
Preceded by Neta Rivkin	Flagbearer for Israel (with Yakov Toumarkin); Tokyo 2020	Succeeded by Andrea Murez; Peter Paltchik; París 2024
