= Track and field at the 2015 Military World Games – Women's triple jump =

The women's triple jump event at the 2015 Military World Games was held on 6 October at the KAFAC Sports Complex.

== Records ==
Prior to this competition, the existing world and CISM record were as follows:

World Record	Inessa Kravets (UKR)	15.50	Gothenburg, Sweden	10 August 1995
CISM World Record	Simona La Mantia (ITA)	14.19	Rio de Janeiro, Brazil	21 July 2011

== Schedule ==
Date	Time	Round
6 October 2015	14:05	Final

== Medalists ==
Gold	Silver	Bronze
Ekaterina Koneva; Russia	Yulimar Rojas; Venezuela	Ana José; Dominican Republic

== Results ==
=== Final ===
Rank	Athlete	Nationality	#1	#2	#3	#4	#5	#6	Result	Notes
1st place, gold medalist(s)	Ekaterina Koneva	Russia	14.26 (+2.1 m/s)	x	14.28 (+1.0 m/s)	x	x	x	14.28 (+1.0 m/s)	CR
2nd place, silver medalist(s)	Yulimar Rojas	Venezuela	x	x	13.82 (+1.9 m/s)	x	x	x	13.82 (+1.9 m/s)	
3rd place, bronze medalist(s)	Ana José	Dominican Republic	13.38 (+2.6 m/s)	13.62 (+0.5 m/s)	13.80 (+1.5 m/s)	13.71 (+1.4 m/s)	x	13.57 (+0.8 m/s)	13.80	
4	Natallia Viatkina	Belarus	13.42 (+1.1 m/s)	x	13.14 (+0.9 m/s)	13.39 (+1.8 m/s)	13.25 (+0.9 m/s)	13.37 (-1.0 m/s)	13.42 (+1.1 m/s)	
5	Kseniya Dziatsuk	Belarus	13.02 (+0.5 m/s)	13.31 (+1.4 m/s)	x	13.19 (+1.8 m/s)	13.14 (+1.1 m/s)	13.01 (-0.7 m/s)	13.31 (+1.4 m/s)	
6	Petia Dacheva	Bulgaria	12.97 (+0.4 m/s)	x	x	13.27 (0.0 m/s)	x	x	13.27 (0.0 m/s)	
7	Jingyu Li	China	13.06 (+1.7 m/s)	13.17 (-0.3 m/s)	12.97 (0.0 m/s)	x	x	12.68 (-1.0 m/s)	13.17 (-0.3 m/s)	
8	Emiata Mary Otoaruoh	Bahrain	12.37 (+2.6 m/s)	x	12.68 (+2.7 m/s)	13.17 (+1.2 m/s)	x	12.93 (+1.4 m/s)	13.17 (+1.2 m/s)	
9	Kassie Gurnell	United States	x	x	12.17 (+2.0 m/s)				12.17 (+2.0 m/s)	
	Keila Costa	Brazil							DNS	
