= 2009 European Athletics Indoor Championships – Women's triple jump =

The Women's triple jump event at the 2009 European Athletics Indoor Championships was held on March 6–8.

== Medalists ==
Gold	Silver	Bronze
Anastasiya Taranova-Potapova; Russia	Marija Šestak; Slovenia	Dana Veldáková; Slovakia

== Results ==
=== Qualification ===
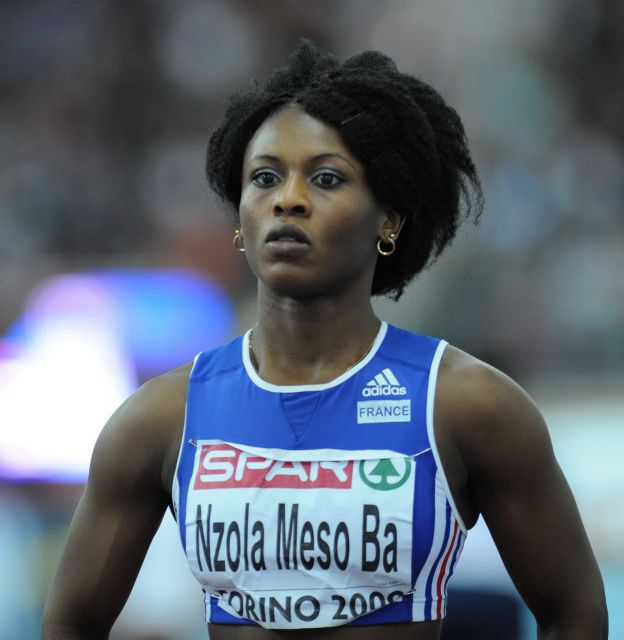
Teresa Nzola Meso Ba of France finished fifth in the final.

Qualifying perf. 14.15 (Q) or 8 best performers (q) advanced to the Final.

Rank	Athlete	Nationality	#1	#2	#3	Result	Note
1	Marija Šestak	Slovenia	14.52			14.52	Q
2	Paraskevi Papahristou	Greece	14.47			14.47	Q, PB
3	Teresa Nzola Meso Ba	France	x	13.95	14.14	14.14	q
4	Dana Veldáková	Slovakia	x	13.90	14.13	14.13	q
5	Biljana Topić	Serbia	14.08	x	x	14.08	q
6	Amy Zongo	France	13.51	14.07	13.98	14.07	q
7	Anastasiya Taranova-Potapova	Russia	14.03	14.06	13.87	14.06	q
8	Snežana Rodic	Slovenia	13.68	14.06	13.70	14.06	q
9	Kaire Leibak	Estonia	13.94	13.91	13.99	13.99	
10	Cristina Bujin	Romania	13.77	13.94	13.59	13.94	
11	Magdelín Martínez	Italy	13.91	13.74	13.88	13.91	
12	Carmen Toma	Romania	x	13.55	13.88	13.88	
13	Katja Demut	Germany	x	13.76	13.64	13.76	
14	Svitlana Mamyeyeva	Ukraine	13.73	x	13.49	13.73	
15	Patricia Sarrapio	Spain	13.73	x	13.40	13.73	SB
16	Joanna Skibińska	Poland	x	13.69	x	13.69	
16	Natallia Viatkina	Belarus	x	x	13.69	13.69	PB
18	Nastassia Mironchyk	Belarus	13.60	13.37	13.48	13.60	
19	Liane Pintsaar	Estonia	13.41	13.12	12.05	13.41	
20	Haykanush Beklaryan	Armenia	x	x	12.57	12.57	NR
	Martina Šestáková	Czech Republic	x	x	x	NM	

=== Final ===
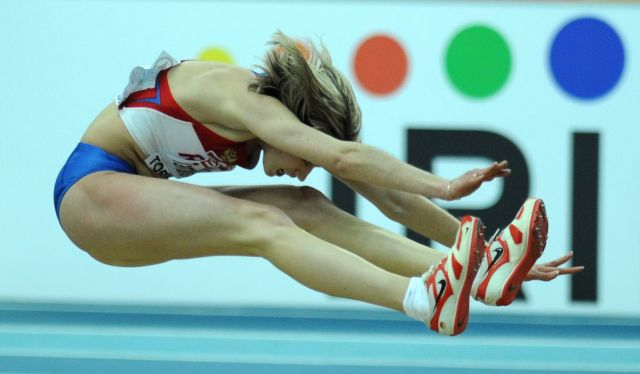
Anastasiya Taranova-Potapova won the gold medal for Russia.

Rank	Athlete	Nationality	#1	#2	#3	#4	#5	#6	Result	Note
1st place, gold medalist(s)	Anastasiya Taranova-Potapova	Russia	14.51	14.47	14.68	–	14.44	x	14.68	PB
2nd place, silver medalist(s)	Marija Šestak	Slovenia	14.46	13.23	14.20	14.34	14.60	14.49	14.60	SB
3rd place, bronze medalist(s)	Dana Veldáková	Slovakia	x	x	14.40	14.19	14.07	x	14.40	NR
4	Biljana Topić	Serbia	14.14	x	14.15	14.32	14.37	x	14.37	NR
5	Teresa Nzola Meso Ba	France	x	14.31	x	13.87	14.02	13.63	14.31	SB
6	Snežana Rodic	Slovenia	13.87	x	x	x	13.86	13.77	13.87	
7	Amy Zongo	France	13.86	x	x	x	13.26	13.69	13.86	
	Paraskevi Papahristou	Greece	x	x	x	x	x	–	NM	
