= 2014 European Athletics Championships – Women's triple jump =

Women's triple jump at the European Athletics Championships

The women's triple jump at the 2014 European Athletics Championships took place at the Letzigrund on 13 and 16 August.

== Medalists ==
Gold	Olha Saladukha; Ukraine
Silver	Yekaterina Koneva; Russia
Bronze	Irina Gumenyuk; Russia

== Records ==
Standing records prior to the 2014 European Athletics Championships
World record	Inessa Kravets (UKR)	15.50 m	Gothenburg, Sweden	10 August 1995
European record	Inessa Kravets (UKR)	15.50 m	Gothenburg, Sweden	10 August 1995
Championship record	Tatyana Lebedeva (RUS)	15.15 m	Gothenburg, Sweden	9 August 2006
World Leading	Caterine Ibargüen (COL)	15.31 m	Fontvieille, Monaco	18 July 2014
European Leading	Yekaterina Koneva (RUS)	14.89 m	Fontvieille, Monaco	18 July 2014

== Schedule ==
Date	Time	Round
13 August 2014	18:30	Qualification
16 August 2014	16:40	Final

All times are local times (UTC+2)

== Results ==
=== Qualification ===
14.20 m (Q) or at least 12 best performers (q) advance to the Final.

Rank	Group	Name	Nationality	#1	#2	#3	Mark	Note
1	A	Olha Saladukha	Ukraine	14.42			14.42	Q, SB
2	B	Yekaterina Koneva	Russia	13.62	14.21		14.21	Q
3	B	Irina Gumenyuk	Russia	x	14.18	–	14.18	q
4	A	Ruth Ndoumbe	Spain	13.64	13.86	14.01	14.01	q
5	B	Kristin Gierisch	Germany	x	13.91	13.85	13.91	q
6	A	Dana Velďáková	Slovakia	13.86	13.49	x	13.86	q
7	A	Jenny Elbe	Germany	13.83	x	–	13.83	q
8	B	Snežana Vukmirović	Slovenia	13.25	13.78	13.33	13.78	q
9	A	Alsu Murtazina	Russia	13.35	x	13.76	13.76	q
10	B	Susana Costa	Portugal	x	13.53	13.76	13.76	q
11	B	Gabriela Petrova	Bulgaria	13.54	13.72	13.69	13.72	q
12	B	Cristina Sandu	Romania	13.67	13.64	13.22	13.67	q
13	A	Patrícia Mamona	Portugal	x	13.54	13.62	13.62	
14	A	Cristina Bujin	Romania	13.61	x	13.61	13.61	
15	B	Anna Jagaciak	Poland	x	13.59	13.55	13.59	
16	A	Dovilė Dzindzaletaitė	Lithuania	11.98	13.12	13.44	13.44	
17	B	Patricia Sarrapio	Spain	x	13.08	13.41w	13.41w	
18	A	Katja Demut	Germany	13.27	11.73	13.39	13.39	
19	A	Andriana Bânova	Bulgaria	13.35	13.36	13.25	13.36	
20	B	Natallia Viatkina	Belarus	x	12.86	13.13	13.13	
21	A	Daria Derkach	Italy	12.52	13.06	12.98	13.06	
22	A	Sevim Sinmez Serbest	Turkey	12.38	x	x	12.38	
	B	Hanna Knyazyeva-Minenko	Israel				DNS	

=== Final ===
Rank	Name	Nationality	#1	#2	#3	#4	#5	#6	Result	Notes
1st place, gold medalist(s)	Olha Saladukha	Ukraine	14.12	14.73	14.68	x	14.59	14.63	14.73	SB
2nd place, silver medalist(s)	Yekaterina Koneva	Russia	14.40	14.69	14.01	14.16	14.54	14.31	14.69	
3rd place, bronze medalist(s)	Irina Gumenyuk	Russia	14.30	x	x	14.00	14.46	x	14.46	SB
4	Ruth Ndoumbe	Spain	14.11	13.94	13.90	13.69	14.14	x	14.14	
5	Gabriela Petrova	Bulgaria	14.13	x	–	x	–	–	14.13	PB
6	Dana Velďáková	Slovakia	x	13.87	x	13.67	x	x	13.87	
7	Snežana Vukmirović	Slovenia	13.77	x	13.74	13.51	13.82	13.40	13.82	
8	Susana Costa	Portugal	x	13.72	13.77	13.78	x	13.40	13.78	
9	Kristin Gierisch	Germany	13.76	13.67	13.58				13.76	
10	Alsu Murtazina	Russia	13.59	12.37	13.76				13.76	
11	Jenny Elbe	Germany	13.68	x	x				13.68	
12	Cristina Sandu	Romania	13.24	13.41	13.58				13.58	
