= 2004 World Junior Championships in Athletics – Women's triple jump =

The women's triple jump event at the 2004 World Junior Championships in Athletics was held in Grosseto, Italy, at Stadio Olimpico Carlo Zecchini on 13 and 15 July.

== Medalists ==
Gold	Anastasiya Taranova; Russia
Silver	Xie Limei; China
Bronze	Tatyana Yakovleva; Russia

== Results ==
=== Final ===
15 July

Rank	Name	Nationality	Attempts						Result	Notes
Rank	Name	Nationality	1	2	3	4	5	6	Result	Notes
1st place, gold medalist(s)	Anastasiya Taranova	Russia	13.94 (w: +0.5 m/s)	13.79 (w: +1.2 m/s)	13.54 (w: +1.1 m/s)	13.80 (w: +1.1 m/s)	13.92 (w: +0.7 m/s)	13.85 (w: +0.7 m/s)	13.94 (w: +0.5 m/s)	
2nd place, silver medalist(s)	Xie Limei	China	x	13.66 (w: -0.2 m/s)	13.38 (w: -0.1 m/s)	13.76 (w: +0.7 m/s)	13.77 (w: +1.3 m/s)	x	13.77 (w: +1.3 m/s)	
3rd place, bronze medalist(s)	Tatyana Yakovleva	Russia	13.40 (w: -0.4 m/s)	x	x	13.24 (w: +1.1 m/s)	13.67 (w: +1.0 m/s)	13.27 (w: +0.5 m/s)	13.67 (w: +1.0 m/s)	
4	Yudelkis Fernández	Cuba	x	13.65 (w: +0.4 m/s)	x	x	12.99 (w: +0.7 m/s)	13.40 (w: +0.3 m/s)	13.65 (w: +0.4 m/s)	
5	Qiu Huijing	China	13.53 (w: -0.7 m/s)	13.33 (w: +1.2 m/s)	x	13.51 (w: +0.4 m/s)	13.46 (w: +0.4 m/s)	13.50 (w: +0.2 m/s)	13.53 (w: -0.7 m/s)	
6	Tatyana Dyachenko	Ukraine	13.09 (w: +0.4 m/s)	11.16 (w: +0.6 m/s)	12.89 (w: 0.0 m/s)	13.47 (w: +1.0 m/s)	x	13.16 (w: +0.5 m/s)	13.47 (w: +1.0 m/s)	
7	Alina Popescu	Romania	12.92 (w: -0.3 m/s)	13.41 (w: +0.7 m/s)	13.33 (w: +1.5 m/s)	13.41 (w: +0.8 m/s)	x	13.44 (w: -0.2 m/s)	13.44 (w: -0.2 m/s)	
8	Margaryta Dobrobobova	Ukraine	13.09 (w: -0.3 m/s)	13.13 (w: -0.2 m/s)	13.11 (w: +0.4 m/s)	13.20 (w: +1.0 m/s)	13.11 (w: +0.7 m/s)	12.85 (w: 0.0 m/s)	13.20 (w: +1.0 m/s)	
9	Darinka Yotova	Bulgaria	12.93 (w: -0.6 m/s)	12.93 (w: +0.7 m/s)	13.04 (w: +1.6 m/s)				13.04 (w: +1.6 m/s)	
10	Cristina Bujin	Romania	12.83 (w: +0.6 m/s)	x	12.95 (w: +1.0 m/s)				12.95 (w: +1.0 m/s)	
11	Erica McLain	United States	12.09 (w: +0.2 m/s)	12.82 (w: +0.4 m/s)	12.89 (w: +0.1 m/s)				12.89 (w: +0.1 m/s)	
12	Vanessa Alesiani	Italy	12.52 (w: +0.4 m/s)	12.63 (w: +0.2 m/s)	12.87 (w: +0.8 m/s)				12.87 (w: +0.8 m/s)	

=== Qualifications ===
13 July

==== Group A ====
Rank	Name	Nationality	Attempts			Result	Notes
Rank	Name	Nationality	1	2	3	Result	Notes
1	Xie Limei	China	12.82 (w: -1.7 m/s)	13.68 (w: +0.3 m/s)	-	13.68 (w: +0.3 m/s)	Q
2	Cristina Bujin	Romania	12.70 (w: +0.4 m/s)	12.77 (w: -0.9 m/s)	13.46 (w: -0.1 m/s)	13.46 (w: -0.1 m/s)	Q
3	Anastasiya Taranova	Russia	13.46 (w: -0.3 m/s)	-	-	13.46 (w: -0.3 m/s)	Q
4	Tatyana Dyachenko	Ukraine	13.06 (w: -0.1 m/s)	13.14 (w: -0.6 m/s)	13.36 (w: -0.1 m/s)	13.36 (w: -0.1 m/s)	Q
5	Latifa Ezziraoui	Morocco	13.15 (w: -2.1 m/s)	13.07 (w: -1.2 m/s)	12.49 (w: -0.9 m/s)	13.15 (w: -2.1 m/s)	
6	Alysha House	Australia	12.93 (w: -1.7 m/s)	x	13.04 (w: 0.0 m/s)	13.04 (w: 0.0 m/s)	
7	Yvette Lewis	United States	12.78 (w: +1.3 m/s)	12.40 (w: -1.7 m/s)	12.96 (w: +0.2 m/s)	12.96 (w: +0.2 m/s)	
8	Olga Savenkova	Latvia	12.44 (w: +0.1 m/s)	12.51 (w: -0.7 m/s)	12.34 (w: -1.5 m/s)	12.51 (w: -0.7 m/s)	
9	Althea Duncan	Jamaica	12.25 (w: -0.7 m/s)	12.16 (w: +1.7 m/s)	11.75 (w: -1.5 m/s)	12.25 (w: -0.7 m/s)	
10	Elena Denkova	Bulgaria	12.13 (w: +0.7 m/s)	12.10 (w: +0.1 m/s)	12.15 (w: -0.2 m/s)	12.15 (w: -0.2 m/s)	
11	Elvira Shinibekova	Uzbekistan	x	12.00 (w: +1.7 m/s)	10.33 (w: -0.4 m/s)	12.00 (w: +1.7 m/s)	
12	Mfon Etim	Sweden	x	x	11.14 (w: -1.7 m/s)	11.14 (w: -1.7 m/s)	

==== Group B ====
Rank	Name	Nationality	Attempts			Result	Notes
Rank	Name	Nationality	1	2	3	Result	Notes
1	Tatyana Yakovleva	Russia	13.11 (w: +1.8 m/s)	13.45 (w: +0.6 m/s)	-	13.45 (w: +0.6 m/s)	Q
2	Yudelkis Fernández	Cuba	13.43 (w: -1.0 m/s)	-	-	13.43 (w: -1.0 m/s)	Q
3	Qiu Huijing	China	13.37 (w: +0.1 m/s)	-	-	13.37 (w: +0.1 m/s)	Q
4	Vanessa Alesiani	Italy	x	13.35 (w: +1.1 m/s)	-	13.35 (w: +1.1 m/s)	Q
5	Margaryta Dobrobobova	Ukraine	12.76 (w: -0.7 m/s)	13.33 (w: +1.4 m/s)	-	13.33 (w: +1.4 m/s)	Q
6	Alina Popescu	Romania	13.31 (w: +1.0 m/s)	-	-	13.31 (w: +1.0 m/s)	Q
7	Erica McLain	United States	12.77 (w: -0.7 m/s)	13.30 (w: -0.3 m/s)	-	13.30 (w: -0.3 m/s)	Q
8	Darinka Yotova	Bulgaria	12.97 (w: +1.8 m/s)	12.53 (w: -1.4 m/s)	13.27 w (w: +2.3 m/s)	13.27 w (w: +2.3 m/s)	Q
9	Tânia da Silva	Brazil	12.84 (w: +0.4 m/s)	x	12.82 (w: +0.3 m/s)	12.84 (w: +0.4 m/s)	
10	Diana Plumaki	Uzbekistan	11.29 (w: -1.6 m/s)	12.55 (w: -0.1 m/s)	12.49 (w: -0.9 m/s)	12.55 (w: -0.1 m/s)	
11	Rakhima Sardi	Kyrgyzstan	12.39 (w: -2.1 m/s)	12.06 (w: -0.9 m/s)	12.47 (w: 0.0 m/s)	12.47 (w: 0.0 m/s)	
	Laura Rossell Kauppinen	Andorra	x	x	x	NM	

== Participation ==
According to an unofficial count, 24 athletes from 17 countries participated in the event.

- Andorra (1)
- Australia (1)
- Brazil (1)
- Bulgaria (2)
- China (2)
- Cuba (1)
- Italy (1)
- Jamaica (1)
- Kyrgyzstan (1)
- Latvia (1)
- Morocco (1)
- Romania (2)
- Russia (2)
- Sweden (1)
- Ukraine (2)
- United States (2)
- Uzbekistan (2)
