= 2013 World Championships in Athletics – Women's triple jump =

Women's Triple Jump event at the 2013 World Championships in Luzhniki, Russia

Women's triple jump at the 2013 World Championships
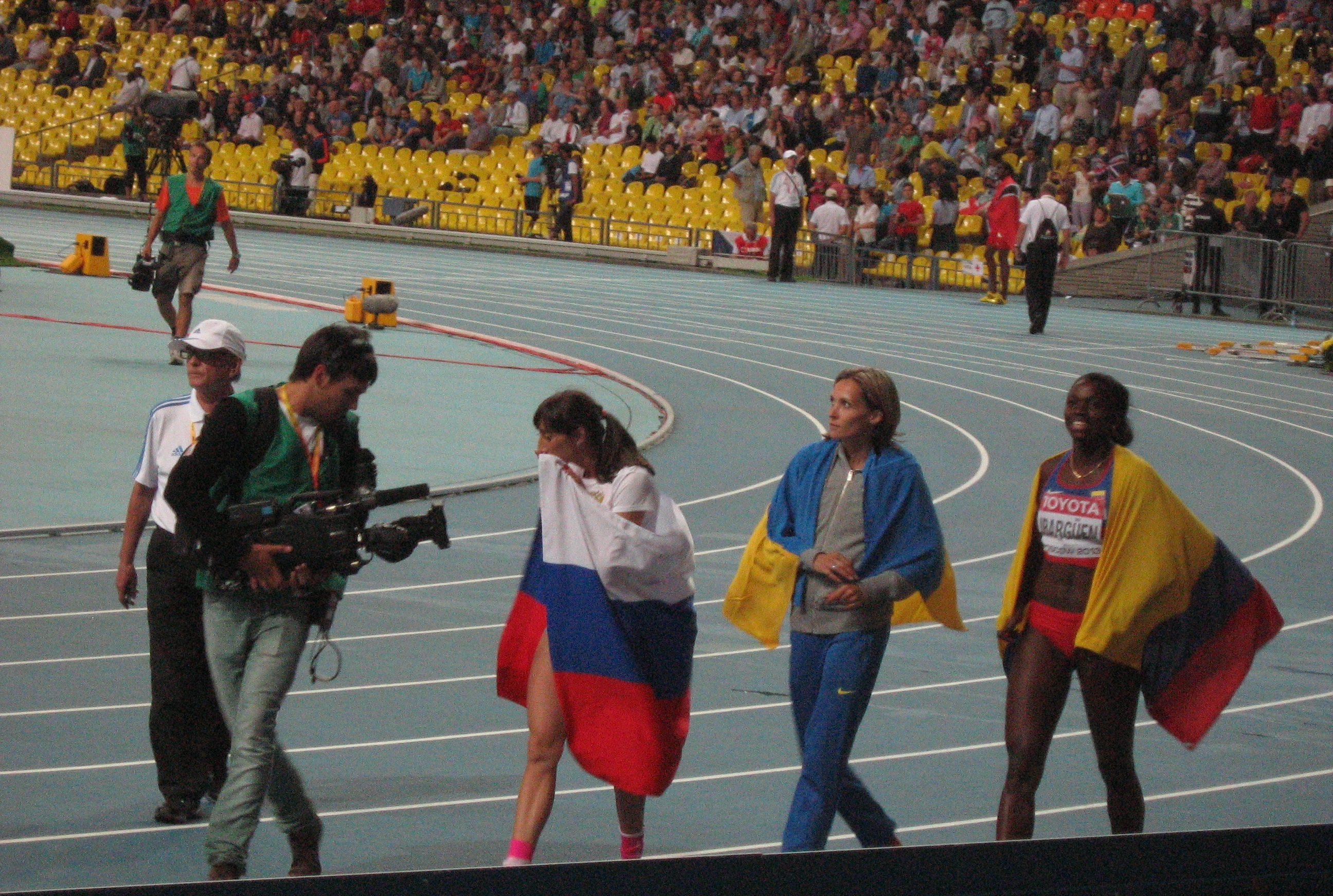
- Women's triple jump medalists
- Venue: Luzhniki Stadium
- Dates: 13 August (qualification); 15 August (final)
- Competitors: 21 from 17 nations
- Winning distance: 14.85 m (48 ft 8 1/2 in)

Medalists
| gold medal | Caterine Ibargüen; Colombia |
| silver medal | Ekaterina Koneva; Russia |
| bronze medal | Olha Saladukha; Ukraine |

The women's triple jump at the 2013 World Championships in Athletics was held at the Luzhniki Stadium on 13–15 August.

Defending champion Olha Saladuha was the leading qualifier, but it took her two attempts to get there. Irina Gumenyuk and world leader Caterine Ibargüen took care of business on their first attempts. Saladuha's former Ukrainian teammate Hanna Knyazyeva-Minenko, now competing for Israel, suffered through two fouls before popping the No. 3 qualifier on her last attempt.

In the final, Saladuha took the first round lead, with Knyazyeva-Minenko leading a crowd of four hovering around 14.30. In the second round, the event was decided. First the home team's Ekaterina Koneva put one out at 14.81 to take the lead. Two jumps later, Ibargüen improved on her world leading jump of the year by going 14.85, just 4 cm further. Two jumps after that, Saladuha improved out to 14.65. That turned out to be it, but nobody knew it. Ibargüen continued with a 14.83 in the fourth round, which turned out to be the second best of the competition and watched nervously as Koneva tickled her best with a 14.79 in the fifth. But the lead held up and Ibargüen took home Colombia's first World Championship gold medal to go along with the bronzes she and racewalker Luis Fernando López earned in Daegu.

== Records ==
Prior to the competition, the records were as follows:

| World record | Inessa Kravets (UKR) | 15.50 | Gothenburg, Sweden | 10 August 1995 |
| Championship record | Inessa Kravets (UKR) | 15.50 | Göteborg, Sweden | 10 August 1995 |
| World leading | Olha Saladuha (UKR) | 14.85 | Eugene, United States | 1 June 2013 |
| African record | Françoise Mbango Etone (CMR) | 15.39 | Beijing, People's Republic of China | 17 August 2008 |
| Asian record | Olga Rypakova (KAZ) | 15.25 | Split, Croatia | 4 September 2010 |
| North, Central American and Caribbean record | Yargelis Savigne (CUB) | 15.28 | Osaka, Japan | 31 August 2007 |
| South American record | Caterine Ibargüen (COL) | 14.99 | Bogotá, Colombia | 13 August 2011 |
| European record | Inessa Kravets (UKR) | 15.50 | Göteborg, Sweden | 10 August 1995 |
| Oceanian record | Nicole Mladenis (AUS) | 14.04 | Hobart, Australia | 9 March 2002 |
| Oceanian record | Nicole Mladenis (AUS) | 14.04 | Perth, Australia | 7 December 2003 |

== Schedule ==
| Date | Time | Round |
|---|---|---|
| 13 August 2013 | 11:25 | Qualification |
| 15 August 2013 | 19:40 | Final |

All times are local times (UTC+4)

== Results ==
| KEY: | Q | Qualified | q | 12 best performers | NR | National record | PB | Personal best | SB | Seasonal best |

=== Qualification ===
Qualification: Qualifying Performance 14.30 (Q) or at least 12 best performers (q) advance to the final.

| Rank | Group | Name | Nationality | No. 1 | No. 2 | No. 3 | Result | Notes |
|---|---|---|---|---|---|---|---|---|
| 1 | A | Olha Saladuha | Ukraine | 13.95 | 14.69 | | 14.69 | Q |
| 2 | B | Caterine Ibargüen | Colombia | 14.52 | | | 14.52 | Q |
| 3 | A | Hanna Knyazyeva-Minenko | Israel | x | x | 14.46 | 14.46 | Q |
| 4 | B | Anna Pyatykh | Russia | 13.80 | x | 14.34 | 14.34 | Q |
| 5 | A | Kimberly Williams | Jamaica | 14.25 | 14.36 | | 14.36 | Q |
| 6 | B | Ekaterina Koneva | Russia | 13.32 | 14.30 | | 14.30 | Q |
| 7 | A | Irina Gumenyuk | Russia | 14.30 | | | 14.30 | Q |
| 8 | A | Mabel Gay | Cuba | 13.99 | 13.95 | 14.17 | 14.17 | q |
| 9 | B | Snežana Rodić | Slovenia | 13.73 | x | 14.17 | 14.17 | q |
| 10 | B | Anna Jagaciak | Poland | x | 13.21 | 13.96 | 13.96 | q |
| 11 | B | Athanasia Perra | Greece | x | 13.85 | 13.92 | 13.92 | q |
| 12 | A | Dana Velďáková | Slovakia | x | 13.88 | 13.85 | 13.88 | q |
| 13 | A | Keila Costa | Brazil | 13.82 | 13.80 | 13.67 | 13.82 | |
| 14 | B | Simona La Mantia | Italy | 13.57 | x | 13.80 | 13.80 | |
| 15 | A | Niki Panetta | Greece | 13.04 | 13.69 | 13.52 | 13.69 | |
| 16 | B | Ruslana Tsykhotska | Ukraine | 13.51 | x | x | 13.51 | |
| 17 | B | Baya Rahouli | Algeria | x | 13.41 | x | 13.41 | |
| 18 | A | Irina Litvinenko Ektova | Kazakhstan | x | 13.09 | 13.37 | 13.37 | |
| 19 | A | Anastasiya Juravleva | Uzbekistan | 13.03 | 13.32 | x | 13.32 | |
| 20 | A | Sarah Nambawa | Uganda | x | x | 13.31 | 13.31 | |
| 21 | B | Natallia Viatkina | Belarus | 13.19 | x | 13.02 | 13.19 | |

=== Final ===
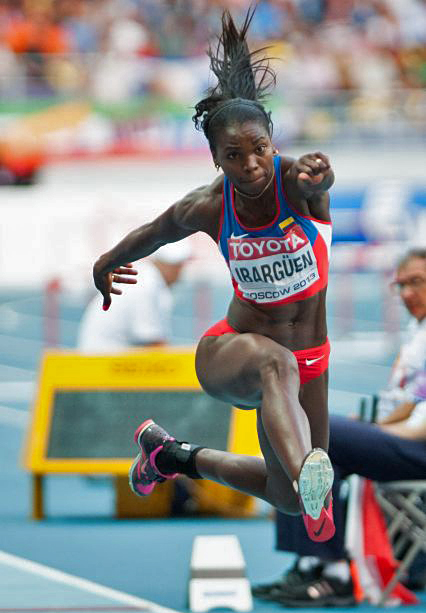
Gold medalist Caterine Ibargüen.

The final was started at 19:40.

| Rank | Name | Nationality | No. 1 | No. 2 | No. 3 | No. 4 | No. 5 | No. 6 | Result | Notes |
|---|---|---|---|---|---|---|---|---|---|---|
| 1st place, gold medalist(s) | Caterine Ibargüen | Colombia | x | 14.85 | 14.69 | 14.83 | x | x | 14.85 | WL |
| 2nd place, silver medalist(s) | Ekaterina Koneva | Russia | 14.29 | 14.81 | 14.59 | 14.33 | 14.79 | 12.18 | 14.81 | |
| 3rd place, bronze medalist(s) | Olha Saladuha | Ukraine | 14.42 | 14.65 | 14.33 | 14.51 | 14.60 | 14.49 | 14.65 | |
| 4 | Kimberly Williams | Jamaica | x | 13.98 | 14.17 | 14.62 | x | x | 14.62 | PB |
| 5 | Mabel Gay | Cuba | 14.28 | 14.38 | 13.83 | 14.45 | 14.29 | x | 14.45 | SB |
| 6 | Hanna Knyazyeva-Minenko | Israel | 14.33 | 14.19 | x | x | 14.14 | x | 14.33 | |
| 7 | Anna Pyatykh | Russia | 14.29 | 11.68 | 14.08 | 14.21 | 14.22 | 14.20 | 14.29 | |
| 8 | Irina Gumenyuk | Russia | x | x | 14.15 | x | 13.98 | x | 14.15 | |
| 9 | Snežana Rodić | Slovenia | 13.75 | x | 14.13 | | | | 14.13 | |
| 10 | Anna Jagaciak | Poland | 13.65 | 13.95 | 13.65 | | | | 13.95 | |
| 11 | Dana Velďáková | Slovakia | x | 13.84 | 13.60 | | | | 13.84 | |
| 12 | Athanasia Perra | Greece | x | 13.75 | 13.55 | | | | 13.75 | |
