= Track and field at the 2015 Military World Games – Women's long jump =

The women's long jump event at the 2015 Military World Games was held on 8 October at the KAFAC Sports Complex.

== Records ==
Prior to this competition, the existing world and CISM record were as follows:

World Record	Galina Chistyakova (URS)	7.52	Leningrad, Soviet Union	11 June 1988
CISM World Record	Olga Rublyova (RUS)	6.71	Rome, Italy	September 1995

== Schedule ==
Date	Time	Round
8 October 2015	13:30	Final

== Medalists ==
Gold	Silver	Bronze
Ekaterina Koneva; Russia	Volha Sudarava; Belarus	Alina Rotaru; Romania

== Results ==
=== Final ===
Rank	Athlete	Nationality	#1	#2	#3	#4	#5	#6	Result	Notes
1st place, gold medalist(s)	Ekaterina Koneva	Russia	6.29 (-2.0 m/s)	6.39 (-2.1 m/s)	6.24 (-3.3 m/s)	x	x	6.35 (-0.1 m/s)	6.39 (-2.1 m/s)	
2nd place, silver medalist(s)	Volha Sudarava	Belarus	6.20 (-2.6 m/s)	6.33 (-0.8 m/s)	6.36 (-0.6 m/s)	x	6.31 (-1.5 m/s)	5.91 (+1.7 m/s)	6.36 (-0.6 m/s)	
3rd place, bronze medalist(s)	Alina Rotaru	Romania	6.32 (+0.3 m/s)	6.15 (-0.4 m/s)	6.33 (-0.7 m/s)	6.28 (-1.1 m/s)	6.21 (-0.2 m/s)	x	6.33 (-1.1 m/s)	
4	Margaryta Tverdokhlib	Ukraine	x	6.12 (-1.5 m/s)	6.25 (-1.4 m/s)	6.05 (-1.0 m/s)	x	6.10 (0.0 m/s)	6.25 (-1.4 m/s)	
5	Jessica dos Reis	Brazil	x	6.06 (-0.9 m/s)	6.14 (-0.7 m/s)	6.13 (-1.0 m/s)	6.18 (0.0 m/s)	6.15 (-2.0 m/s)	6.18 (0.0 m/s)	
6	Linda Züblin	Switzerland	6.02 (-0.9 m/s)	6.13 (-2.7 m/s)	x	x	5.69 (-0.7 m/s)	6.17 (+0.9 m/s)	6.17 (+0.9 m/s)	
7	Marlyne Ngo Ngoa	Cameroon	x	5.99 (-1.5 m/s)	6.02 (-2.4 m/s)	6.14 (-2.5 m/s)	x	6.09 (+0.1 m/s)	6.14 (-2.5 m/s)	
8	Yulimar Rojas	Venezuela	5.98 (-2.2 m/s)	6.00 (-0.6 m/s)	6.02 (-0.3 m/s)	6.03 (-0.7 m/s)	x	6.12 (-0.7 m/s)	6.12 (-0.7 m/s)	
9	Chamali Dilrukshi Nawanage	Sri Lanka	x	x	5.91 (-0.9 m/s)				5.91 (-0.9 m/s)	
10	Ekaterina Poplavskaya	Belarus	5.89 (+2.9 m/s)	5.79 (-0.2 m/s)	5.59 (-1.6 m/s)				5.89 (+2.9 m/s)	
11	Emiata Mary Otoaruoh	Bahrain	5.63 (-1.5 m/s)	5.73 (-0.6 m/s)	5.61 (-0.7 m/s)				5.73 (-0.6 m/s)	
12	Priscilla Tabunda	Kenya	5.72 (0.0 m/s)	5.52 (-0.8 m/s)	5.44 (-1.9 m/s)				5.72 (0.0 m/s)	
13	Fitria Indah Wahyuni	Indonesia	5.51 (-3.4 m/s)	5.71 (-0.4 m/s)	5.63 (+0.8 m/s)				5.71 (-0.4 m/s)	
	Petia Dacheva	Bulgaria							DNS	
