= Cristina Bujin =

Romanian triple jumper

Personal information
- Born: 12 April 1988 (age 38) Constanța, Romania
- Height: 1.72 m (5 ft 7 1/2 in)
- Weight: 53 kg (117 lb)

Sport
- Country: Romania
- Sport: Athletics
- Event: Triple jump
- Updated on 15 August 2012

Cristina Ioana Bujin (born 12 April 1988) is a Romanian triple jumper.

== Life and career ==
She was born in Constanța. She was a prolific competitor at youth and junior events in her early career. She finished fifth in the long jump at the 2003 World Youth Championships. She then only reached triple jump finals, winning the bronze medal at the 2005 World Youth Championships, placing sixth at the 2006 World Junior Championships and third again at the 2007 European Junior Championships.

She competed at the 2007 European Indoor Championships, the 2008 World Indoor Championships and the 2009 European Indoor Championships without reaching the final, before finally succeeding at the 2009 World Championships where she finished seventh in the final. She also won the silver medal at the 2009 European U23 Championships.

Her personal best is 14.42 metres, achieved on 1 August 2009 in Bucharest. On the next day she managed 6.38 metres in the long jump, that too a personal best.

== Competition record ==
Year	Competition	Venue	Position	Event	Notes
Representing Romania
2003	World Youth Championships	Sherbrooke, Canada	5th	Long jump	6.03 m
2004	World Junior Championships	Grosseto, Italy	19th (q)	Long jump	5.47 m (-1.8 m/s)
2004	World Junior Championships	Grosseto, Italy	10th	Triple jump	12.95 m (+1.0 m/s)
2005	World Youth Championships	Marrakesh, Morocco	3rd	Triple jump	13.23 m
2005	European Junior Championships	Kaunas, Lithuania	19th (q)	Long jump	5.73 m
2005	European Junior Championships	Kaunas, Lithuania	2nd	Triple jump	13.72 m
2006	World Junior Championships	Beijing, China	6th	Triple jump	13.35 m (+0.7 m/s)
2007	European Indoor Championships	Birmingham, United Kingdom	13th (q)	Triple jump	13.31 m
2007	European Junior Championships	Hengelo, Netherlands	3rd	Triple jump	13.57 m
2008	World Indoor Championships	Valencia, Spain	14th (q)	Triple jump	13.78 m
2009	European Indoor Championships	Turin, Italy	10th (q)	Triple jump	13.94 m
2009	European U23 Championships	Kaunas, Lithuania	2nd	Triple jump	14.26 m
2009	World Championships	Berlin, Germany	7th	Triple jump	14.26 m
2011	European Indoor Championships	Paris, France	5th	Triple jump	14.19 m
2011	Universiade	Shenzhen, China	3rd	Triple jump	14.21 m
2012	World Indoor Championships	Istanbul, Turkey	15th (q)	Triple jump	13.80 m
2012	European Championships	Helsinki, Finland	21st (q)	Triple jump	13.34 m
2012	Olympic Games	London, United Kingdom	–	Triple jump	NM
2013	European Indoor Championships	Gothenburg, Sweden	15th (q)	Triple jump	13.47 m
2014	European Championships	Zurich, Switzerland	14th (q)	Triple jump	13.61 m
2015	European Indoor Championships	Prague, Czech Republic	6th	Triple jump	13.91 m
2015	World Championships	Beijing, China	25th (q)	Triple jump	13.21 m
2016	Olympic Games	Rio de Janeiro, Brazil	30th (q)	Triple jump	13.38 m
2017	European Indoor Championships	Belgrade, Serbia	15th (q)	Triple jump	13.44 m
2017	Jeux de la Francophonie	Abidjan, Ivory Coast	3rd	Triple jump	13.20 m
