= 2015 World Championships in Athletics – Women's triple jump =

Women's Triple Jump event at the 2015 World Championships in Beijing

Women's triple jump at the 2015 World Championships
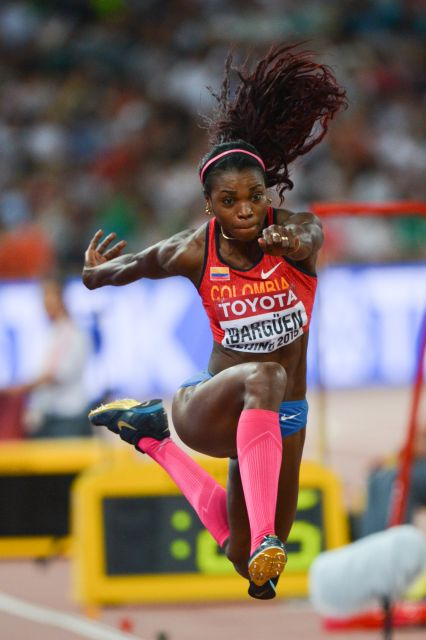
- Winner Caterine Ibargüen
- Venue: Beijing National Stadium
- Dates: 22 August (qualification); 24 August (final)
- Competitors: 28 from 19 nations
- Winning distance: 14.90

Medalists
gold medal	Caterine Ibargüen	Colombia
silver medal	Hanna Knyazyeva-Minenko	Israel
bronze medal	Olga Rypakova	Kazakhstan

The women's triple jump at the 2015 World Championships in Athletics was held at the Beijing National Stadium on 22 and 24 August.

The returning champion Caterine Ibargüen looked like the favorite, the most consistent jumper year round. The world leader was the returning silver medalist Ekaterina Koneva and even her world leading jump lost the competition to a wind aided jump by Ibargüen. The Olympic Champion Olga Rypakova had beaten Ibargüen both in the Olympics and at the 2011 World Championships, but not in the last three years.

Gabriela Petrova took the early lead with her first jump 14.52. Former Ukrainian Hanna Knyazyeva-Minenko made a big improvement to her own National Record of her new country Israel with a 14.78. Her lead lasted through two jumpers before Ibargüen took the lead with her second round 14.80. That wasn't even her best jump of the day, but it was enough to beat any other athlete in the competition. In the fourth round Ibargüen jumped 14.90 for the winner. Rypakova moved into third position with a 14.59 in the fourth round. Petrova answered with a 14.66 on her fifth attempt. Rypakova came back on her final attempt, her 14.77 tickled Knyazyeva-Minenko's second place mark but was a cm short putting her in the bronze medal after Petrova was unable to answer a second time. All of the first five performers had season bests. Knyazyeva-Minenko's medal was the first World Championship medal for an Israeli woman.

== Records ==
Prior to the competition, the records were as follows:

World record	Inessa Kravets (UKR)	15.50	Gothenburg, Sweden	10 August 1995
Championship record	Inessa Kravets (UKR)	15.50	Gothenburg, Sweden	10 August 1995
World leading	Ekaterina Koneva (RUS)	15.04	Eugene, OR, United States	30 May 2015
African record	Françoise Mbango Etone (CMR)	15.39	Beijing, China	17 August 2008
Asian record	Olga Rypakova (KAZ)	15.25	Split, Croatia	4 September 2010
North, Central American and Caribbean record	Yargelis Savigne (CUB)	15.28	Osaka, Japan	31 August 2007
South American record	Caterine Ibargüen (COL)	15.31	Fontvieille, Monaco	18 July 2014
European record	Inessa Kravets (UKR)	15.50	Göteborg, Sweden	10 August 1995
Oceanian record	Nicole Mladenis (AUS)	14.04	Hobart, Australia	9 March 2002
Oceanian record	Nicole Mladenis (AUS)	14.04	Perth, Australia	7 December 2003

== Qualification standards ==
Entry standards
14.20

== Schedule ==
Date	Time	Round
22 August 2015	19:10	Qualification
24 August 2015	19:30	Final

All times are local times (UTC+8)

== Results ==
KEY:	Q	Qualified	q	12 best performers	NR	National record	PB	Personal best	SB	Seasonal best

=== Qualification ===
Qualification: 14.25 m (Q) or at least best 12 performers (q)

Rank	Group	Name	Nationality	#1	#2	#3	Mark	Notes
1	B	Gabriela Petrova	Bulgaria	14.09	14.11	14.44	14.44	Q
2	B	Caterine Ibargüen	Colombia	14.42			14.42	Q
3	A	Olha Saladuha	Ukraine	14.34			14.34	Q
4	B	Olga Rypakova	Kazakhstan	14.33			14.33	Q
5	A	Hanna Knyazyeva-Minenko	Israel	14.27			14.27	Q
6	A	Kimberly Williams	Jamaica	x	14.23	13.92	14.23	q
7	A	Ekaterina Koneva	Russia	14.12	13.69	13.65	14.12	q
8	B	Shanieka Thomas	Jamaica	13.90	14.05	13.89	14.05	q
9	B	Jeanine Assani Issouf	France	x	13.77	14.04	14.04	q
10	B	Keila Costa	Brazil	13.60	13.86	14.03	14.03	q
11	B	Kristin Gierisch	Germany	13.71	x	13.95	13.95	q
12	A	Yosiris Urrutia	Colombia	x	13.84	13.17	13.84	q
13	B	Kristiina Mäkelä	Finland	x	x	13.83	13.83	
14	A	Simona La Mantia	Italy	x	13.49	13.77	13.77	
15	A	Dana Velďáková	Slovakia	x	13.76	13.74	13.76	
16	A	Patrícia Mamona	Portugal	13.61	13.74	13.58	13.74	
17	A	Irina Ektova	Kazakhstan	x	13.61	x	13.61	
18	A	Elena Panțuroiu	Romania	13.58	x	13.50	13.58	
19	A	Dovilė Dzindzaletaitė	Lithuania	13.58	12.51	x	13.58	
20	B	Li Yanmei	China	x	13.40	13.57	13.57	
21	A	Li Xiaohong	China	13.52	13.46	x	13.52	
22	A	Núbia Soares	Brazil	x	x	13.52	13.52	SB
23	A	Wang Wupin	China	12.93	12.94	13.48	13.48	
24	B	Christina Epps	United States	x	13.36	x	13.36	
25	B	Cristina Bujin	Romania	x	13.21	x	13.21	
26	B	Joëlle Mbumi Nkouindjin	Cameroon	x	x	13.06	13.06	
27	B	Tetyana Ptashkina	Ukraine	x	x	13.05	13.05	
	B	Susana Costa	Portugal	x	x	x	NM	

=== Final ===
The final was started at 19:30.

Rank	Name	Nationality	# 1	# 2	# 3	# 4	# 5	# 6	Result	Wind	Notes
1st place, gold medalist(s)	Caterine Ibargüen	Colombia	14.47	14.80	14.54	14.90	13.93	14.70	14.90	+0.1	SB
2nd place, silver medalist(s)	Hanna Knyazyeva-Minenko	Israel	x	14.78	14.53	x	x	x	14.78	-0.1	NR
3rd place, bronze medalist(s)	Olga Rypakova	Kazakhstan	14.23	x	x	14.59	x	14.77	14.77	+0.1	SB
4	Gabriela Petrova	Bulgaria	14.52	14.33	14.47	14.23	14.66	14.44	14.66	+0.4	PB
5	Kimberly Williams	Jamaica	13.97	14.26	14.16	14.06	14.45	x	14.45	+0.0	SB
6	Olha Saladuha	Ukraine	14.22	14.05	14.04	14.41	x	14.39	14.41	+0.4	
7	Ekaterina Koneva	Russia	14.03	14.37	14.05	14.36	14.25	14.35	14.37	+0.0	
8	Kristin Gierisch	Germany	x	13.63	14.25	14.18	14.25	12.87	14.25	+0.1	
9	Jeanine Assani Issouf	France	13.83	x	14.12				14.12	+0.0	
10	Yosiris Urrutia	Colombia	14.09	13.93	x				14.09	-0.3	
11	Shanieka Thomas	Jamaica	13.88	14.01	14.08				14.08	+0.2	
12	Keila Costa	Brazil	13.72	x	13.90				13.90	+0.2	
