= Athletics at the 2011 Summer Universiade – Women's triple jump =

The women's triple jump event at the 2011 Summer Universiade was held on 18–20 August.

== Medalists ==
Gold	Silver	Bronze
Ekaterina Koneva; Russia	Patrícia Mamona; Portugal	Cristina Bujin; Romania

== Results ==
=== Qualification ===
Qualification: 13.90 m (Q) or at least 12 best (q) qualified for the final.

Rank	Group	Athlete	Nationality	#1	#2	#3	Result	Notes
1	B	Cristina Bujin	Romania	x	13.76	14.30	14.30	Q, SB
2	A	Natalia Iastrebova	Ukraine	x	13.59	13.95	13.95	Q
3	B	Deng Lina	China	13.76	13.89	–	13.89	q, PB
4	B	Patrícia Mamona	Portugal	13.64	13.89	–	13.89	q
5	A	Ekaterina Koneva	Russia	x	13.87	13.73	13.87	q
6	B	Jenny Elbe	Germany	x	13.80	–	13.80	q
7	B	Hanna Knyazyeva	Ukraine	13.74	x	x	13.74	q
8	A	Wang Huiqin	China	x	13.67	13.61	13.67	q
9	B	Linda Allen	Australia	13.05	13.42	13.55	13.55	q
10	B	Natallia Viatkina	Belarus	13.53	13.50	x	13.53	q
11	B	Thitima Muangjan	Thailand	x	13.50	x	13.50	q
12	A	Carmen Toma	Romania	x	13.36	x	13.36	q
13	A	Irina Litvinenko	Kazakhstan	13.22	12.11	13.06	13.22	
14	A	Elina Torro	Finland	13.17	x	x	13.17	
15	A	Anna Jagaciak	Poland	x	13.15	x	13.15	
16	A	Eleonora D'Elicio	Italy	12.93	12.90	13.10	13.10	
17	B	Nkeiruka Domike	Nigeria	12.78	x	13.05	13.05	
18	A	Maitane Azpeitia	Spain	12.97	12.88	x	12.97	
19	B	Çağdaş Arslan	Turkey	12.86	x	x	12.86	
20	A	Sibongile Ntshingila	South Africa	12.50	x	12.82	12.82	
21	B	Triin Eerme	Estonia	12.41	12.70	12.61	12.70	PB
22	A	Māra Grīva	Latvia	12.49	x	x	12.49	
23	B	Anna Nazarova	Russia	12.48	x	–	12.48	
24	A	Mereena Joseph	India	x	11.96	x	11.96	
25	B	Katrine Kristensen	Denmark	x	11.61	11.95	11.95	
	A	Sarah Nambawa	Uganda				DNS	
	B	Jana Majed	Lebanon				DNS	

=== Final ===
Rank	Athlete	Nationality	#1	#2	#3	#4	#5	#6	Result	Notes
1st place, gold medalist(s)	Ekaterina Koneva	Russia	14.19	14.25	14.06	14.14	x	x	14.25	PB
2nd place, silver medalist(s)	Patrícia Mamona	Portugal	13.89	13.82	14.07	13.89	14.08	14.23	14.23	
3rd place, bronze medalist(s)	Cristina Bujin	Romania	13.88	x	14.21	14.03	x	13.78	14.21	
4	Hanna Knyazyeva	Ukraine	13.82	x	14.01	14.15	13.85	x	14.15	
5	Natalia Iastrebova	Ukraine	13.82	13.81	13.91	x	14.02	14.04	14.04	
6	Natallia Viatkina	Belarus	13.09	14.00	x	x	x	x	14.00	
7	Carmen Toma	Romania	13.82	x	x	13.75	x	13.70	13.82	
8	Jenny Elbe	Germany	13.73	13.67	13.30	13.20	13.55	13.52	13.73	
9	Wang Huiqin	China	x	12.50	13.72				13.72	
10	Deng Lina	China	x	13.64	13.54				13.64	
11	Thitima Muangjan	Thailand	x	13.52	13.51				13.52	
12	Linda Allen	Australia	12.68	x	13.45				13.45	
