= Patricia Sarrapio =

Spanish triple jumper

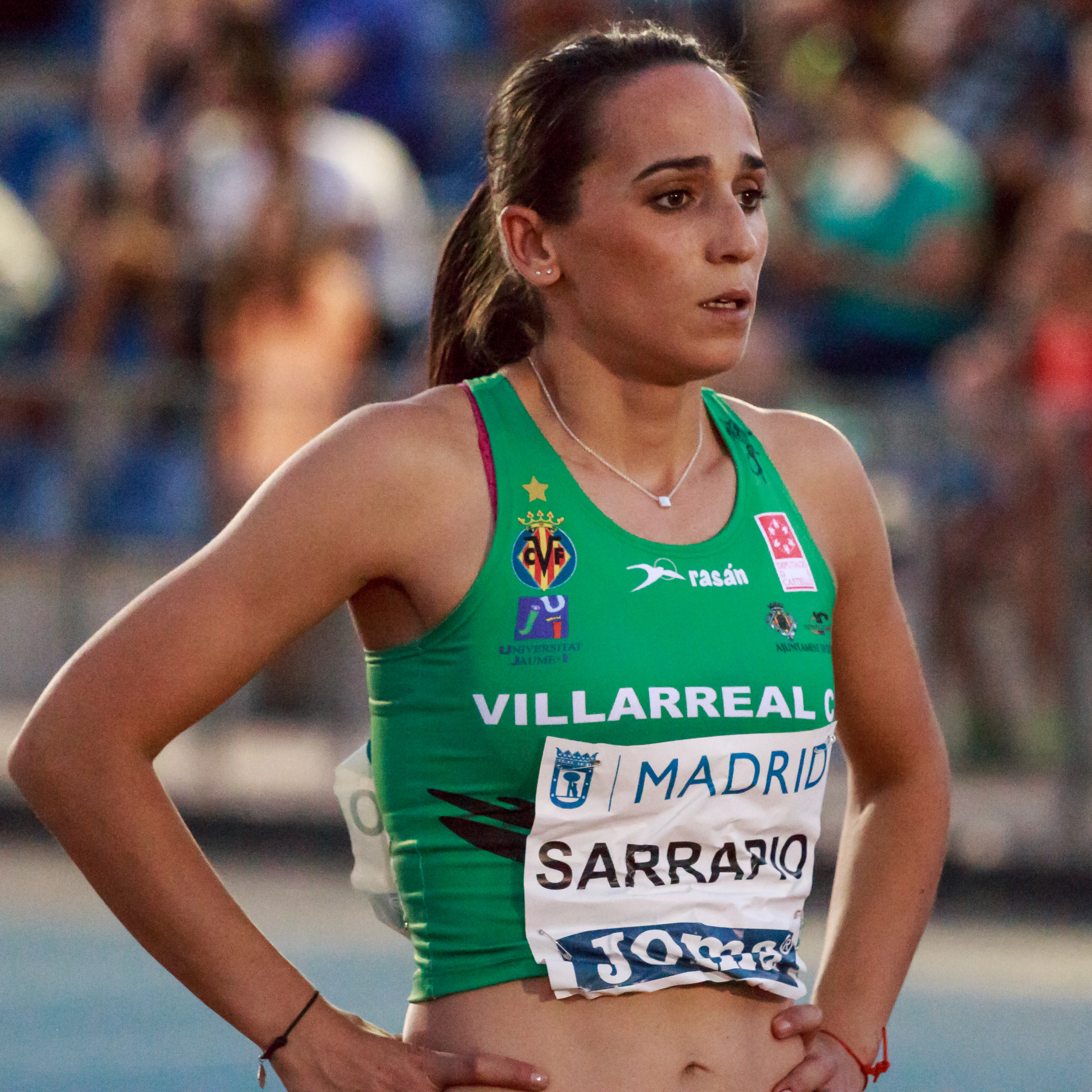
- Patricia Sarrapio in 2017

Personal information
- Born: 16 November 1982 (age 43) Madrid, Spain
- Height: 1.65 m (5 ft 5 in)
- Weight: 56 kg (123 lb)

Sport
- Country: Spain
- Sport: Athletics
- Event: Women's Triple Jump

Patricia Sarrapio Martín (born 16 November 1982) is a Spanish triple jumper. She competed in the triple jump event at the 2012 Summer Olympics.

== Competition record ==
Year	Competition	Venue	Position	Event	Notes
Representing Spain
2000	World Junior Championships	Santiago, Chile	17th (q)	Triple jump	12.66 m (-0.2 m/s)
2001	European Junior Championships	Grosseto, Italy	8th	Triple jump	13.15 m
2005	Mediterranean Games	Almería, Spain	8th	Triple jump	13.53 m
2006	Ibero-American Championships	Ponce, Puerto Rico	1st	Triple jump	13.82 m
2006	European Championships	Gothenburg, Sweden	18th (q)	Triple jump	13.57 m
2007	European Indoor Championships	Birmingham, United Kingdom	9th (q)	Triple jump	13.73 m
2007	Universiade	Bangkok, Thailand	6th	Triple jump	13.81 m
2007	World Championships	Osaka, Japan	22nd (q)	Triple jump	13.55 m
2008	World Indoor Championships	Valencia, Spain	13th (q)	Triple jump	13.86 m
2009	European Indoor Championships	Turin, Italy	15th (q)	Triple jump	13.73 m
2010	Ibero-American Championships	San Fernando, Spain	3rd	Triple jump	14.10 m
2010	European Championships	Barcelona, Spain	21st (q)	Triple jump	13.21 m
2011	European Indoor Championships	Paris, France	9th (q)	Triple jump	13.98 m
2011	World Championships	Daegu, South Korea	34th (q)	Triple jump	13.12 m
2012	World Indoor Championships	Istanbul, Turkey	–	Triple jump	NM
2012	European Championships	Helsinki, Finland	16th (q)	Triple jump	13.90 m
2012	Olympic Games	London, United Kingdom	26th (q)	Triple jump	13.64 m
2013	European Indoor Championships	Gothenburg, Sweden	5th	Triple jump	14.07 m
2014	European Championships	Zurich, Switzerland	17th (q)	Triple jump	13.41 m (w)
2015	European Indoor Championships	Prague, Czech Republic	18th (q)	Triple jump	13.47 m
2016	European Championships	Amsterdam, Netherlands	19th (q)	Triple jump	13.46 m
2016	Olympic Games	Rio de Janeiro, Brazil	32nd (q)	Triple jump	13.35 m
2018	Mediterranean Games	Tarragona, Spain	4th	Triple jump	13.85 m
2018	European Championships	Berlin, Germany	20th (q)	Triple jump	13.87 m
2019	European Indoor Championships	Glasgow, United Kingdom	12th (q)	Triple jump	13.67 m
2019	World Championships	Doha, Qatar	23rd (q)	Triple jump	13.58 m
2022	Ibero-American Championships	La Nucía, Spain	4th	Triple jump	13.71 m
