= Athletics at the 2007 Summer Universiade – Women's triple jump =

The women's triple jump event at the 2007 Summer Universiade was held on 13 August.

== Results ==
Rank	Athlete	Nationality	#1	#2	#3	#4	#5	$6	Result	Notes
1st place, gold medalist(s)	Olha Saladukha	Ukraine	14.25	14.79	14.36	x	14.63	14.73	14.79	PB
2nd place, silver medalist(s)	Dana Velďáková	Slovakia	13.77	14.41	x	13.96	x	x	14.41	PB
3rd place, bronze medalist(s)	Yarianna Martínez	Cuba	x	13.99	x	14.25	14.22	14.16	14.25	
4	Simona La Mantia	Italy	13.67	13.55	13.87	13.47	13.55	x	13.87	
5	Oleksandra Stadnyuk	Ukraine	13.64	13.39	13.64	13.84	x	x	13.84	
6	Patricia Sarrapio	Spain	x	13.61	x	x	x	13.81	13.81	
7	Thitima Muangjan	Thailand	13.58	x	13.62	x	x	13.57	13.62	
8	Anna Kuropatkina	Russia	x	13.00	13.00	13.57	13.49	13.45	13.59	
9	Elena-Alina Popescu	Romania	13.47	13.29	13.55				13.55	
10	Kseniya Pryiemka	Belarus	13.41	13.05	12.87				13.41	
11	Ekaterina Kayukova	Russia	13.38	x	13.30				13.38	
12	Tanja Prudic	Slovenia	12.79	13.25	x				13.25	
13	Irina Litvinenko	Kazakhstan	13.11	13.22	x				13.22	
14	Camélia Sahnoune	Algeria	x	13.07	13.12				13.12	
15	Anna Bondarenko	Kazakhstan	12.58	x	13.01				13.01	
16	Liu Xiao	China	x	12.97	x				12.97	
17	Elina Sorsa	Finland	12.65	12.61	12.91				12.91	
18	Mayookha Johny	India	12.62	12.72	12.32				12.72	
19	Laurice Cristina Félix	Brazil	x	12.69	x				12.69	
20	Wang Ying	China	x	12.57	12.39				12.57	
21	Ammarin Meesa	Thailand	12.24	12.06	x				12.24	
22	Odatte Rasolonirina	Madagascar	10.66	x	x				10.66	
	Lotte Thiesen	Denmark	x	x	x				NM	
	Yah Soucko Koïta	Mali							DNS	
