= 2014 IAAF World Indoor Championships – Women's triple jump =

The women's Triple Jump at the 2014 IAAF World Indoor Championships took place on 7–8 March 2014.

The winning margin was 1 cm which as of July 2024 remains the only time the women's triple jump was won by less than 2 cm at these championships.

== Medalists ==
Gold	Silver	Bronze
Ekaterina Koneva; Russia	Olha Saladuha; Ukraine	Kimberly Williams; Jamaica

== Records ==
Standing records prior to the 2014 IAAF World Indoor Championships
World record	Tatyana Lebedeva (RUS)	15.36	Budapest, Hungary	6 March 2004
Championship record	Tatyana Lebedeva (RUS)	15.36	Budapest, Hungary	6 March 2004
World Leading	Ekaterina Koneva (RUS)	14.65	Samara, Russia	30 January 2014
World Leading	Olha Saladuha (UKR)	14.65	Sumy, Ukraine	21 February 2014
African record	Yamilé Aldama (SUD)	14.90	Budapest, Hungary	6 March 2004
Asian record	Olga Rypakova (KAZ)	15.14	Doha, Qatar	13 March 2010
European record	Tatyana Lebedeva (RUS)	15.36	Budapest, Hungary	6 March 2004
North and Central American and Caribbean record	Yargelis Savigne (CUB)	15.05	Valencia, Spain	8 March 2008
Oceanian Record	Nicole Mladenis (AUS)	13.31	Budapest, Hungary	5 March 2004
South American record	Keila Costa (BRA)	14.11	Moscow, Russia	10 March 2006

== Qualification standards ==
Indoor	Outdoor
14.25

== Schedule ==
Date	Time	Round
7 March 2014	11:00	Qualification
8 March 2014	18:05	Final

== Results ==
=== Qualification ===
Qualification: 14.30 (Q) or at least 8 best performers (q) qualified for the final.

Rank	Athlete	Nationality	#1	#2	#3	Result	Notes
1	Kimberly Williams	Jamaica	14.35			14.35	Q, SB
2	Olha Saladuha	Ukraine	14.31			14.31	Q
3	Ekaterina Koneva	Russia	14.13	14.20	14.20	14.20	q
4	Dana Velďáková	Slovakia	x	14.10	x	14.10	q, SB
5	Yarianna Martínez	Cuba	13.78	14.03	14.04	14.04	q
6	Kseniya Dziatsuk	Belarus	13.47	13.97	13.83	13.97	q
7	Patrícia Mamona	Portugal	x	13.83	x	13.83	q
8	Li Yanmei	China	13.76	13.51	13.69	13.76	q
9	Veronika Mosina	Russia	13.57	13.35	13.68	13.68	
10	Keila Costa	Brazil	13.64	13.47	x	13.64	
11	Anna Jagaciak	Poland	x	13.57	13.41	13.57	

=== Final ===
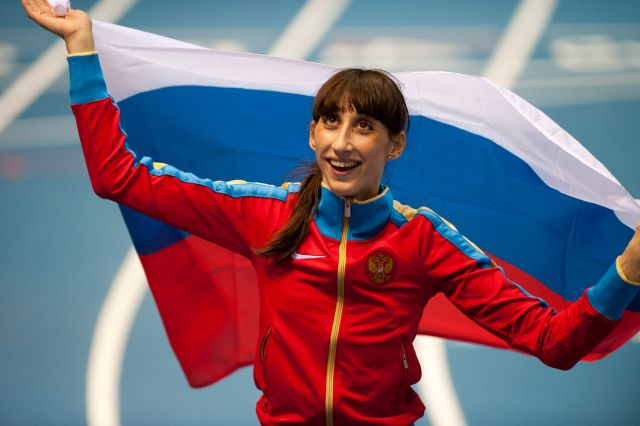
The gold medalist, Ekaterina Koneva of Russia.

Rank	Athlete	Nationality	#1	#2	#3	#4	#5	#6	Result	Notes
1st place, gold medalist(s)	Ekaterina Koneva	Russia	13.96	14.46	14.07	x	14.30	x	14.46	
2nd place, silver medalist(s)	Olha Saladuha	Ukraine	14.28	14.38	14.41	14.45	14.40	14.22	14.45	
3rd place, bronze medalist(s)	Kimberly Williams	Jamaica	14.27	14.34	x	14.23	x	14.39	14.39	SB
4	Patrícia Mamona	Portugal	x	14.26	14.22	x	x	14.25	14.26	
5	Li Yanmei	China	14.19	13.77	x	13.53	13.90	13.81	14.19	SB
6	Kseniya Dziatsuk	Belarus	14.02	x	13.66	14.13	13.73	13.83	14.13	
7	Yarianna Martínez	Cuba	13.90	13.88	13.90	13.99	x	13.66	13.99	
8	Dana Velďáková	Slovakia	x	x	13.63	12.23	x	13.75	13.75	
