= Dana Velďáková =

Slovak triple jumper

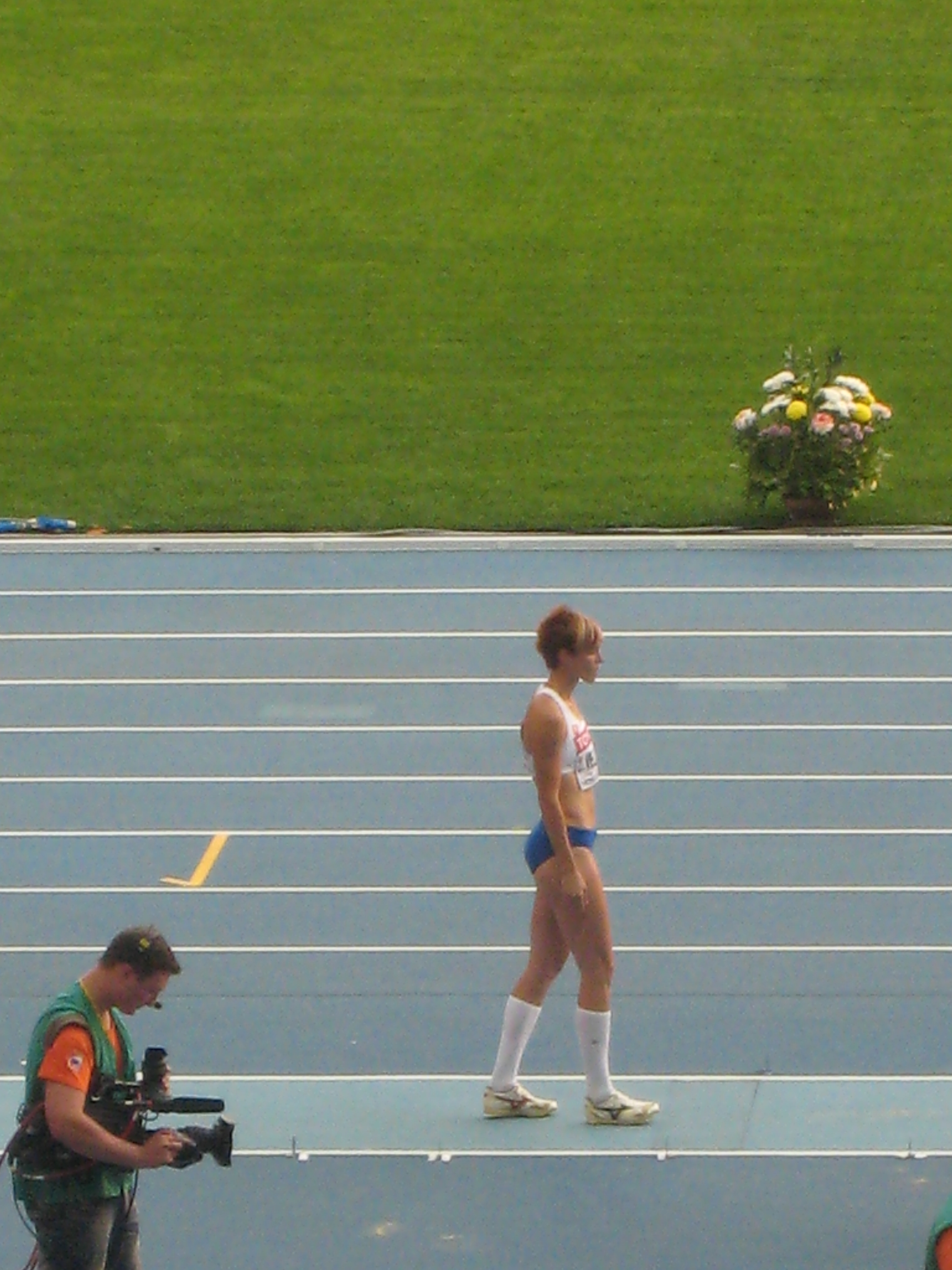
- Velďáková in Moscow 2013

Personal information
- Born: 3 June 1981 (age 45) Rožňava, Czechoslovakia
- Height: 1.79 m (5 ft 10 in)
- Weight: 60 kg (132 lb)

Sport
- Country: Slovakia
- Sport: Athletics
- Event: Triple jump
- Club: Akademik TU Košice
- Coached by: Radoslav Dubovský

Achievements and titles
- Personal best: 14.51
Medal record
Women's athletics
Representing Slovakia
European Indoor Championships
Bronze medal – third place	2009 Turin	Triple jump
Bronze medal – third place	2011 Paris	Triple jump
European Games
Gold medal – first place	2015 Baku	Mixed team
Universiade
Silver medal – second place	2007 Bangkok	Women's triple jump
World Junior Championships
Bronze medal – third place	2000 Santiago	Triple jump
World Youth Games
Bronze medal – third place	1998 Moscow	Triple jump
- Updated on 4 July 2021

Dana Velďáková (born 3 June 1981 in Rožňava, Czechoslovakia) is a former Slovak athlete specialising in the triple jump. A very regular jumper, qualifying for the final at almost every major competition, her biggest senior successes are two bronze medals at the European Athletics Indoor Championships, in 2009 and 2011, and the silver at the 2007 Summer Universiade.

Her personal bests in the event are 14.51 metres outdoors, achieved in May 2008 in Pavia, and 14.40 metres indoors achieved in March 2009 in Turin. Both are current national records.

She has a twin sister named Jana, who is a long jumper.

== International competition ==
Year	Competition	Venue	Position	Event	Notes
Representing Slovakia
1998	World Youth Games	Moscow, Russia	3rd	Triple jump	13.05 m
1998	World Junior Championships	Annecy, France	6th	Triple jump	13.12 m (wind: +0.9 m/s) (PB)
1999	European Junior Championships	Riga, Latvia	8th	Triple jump	13.08 m
2000	World Junior Championships	Santiago, Chile	4th	Long jump	6.35 m (wind: +0.7 m/s) (PB)
2000	World Junior Championships	Santiago, Chile	3rd	Triple jump	13.92 m (wind: +1.4 m/s) (PB)
2001	European U23 Championships	Amsterdam, Netherlands	5th	Triple jump	13.50 m (wind: 0.9 m/s)
2002	European Indoor Championships	Vienna, Austria	12th (q)	Triple jump	13.45 m
2002	European Championships	Munich, Germany	14th (q)	Triple jump	13.78 m
2003	European U23 Championships	Bydgoszcz, Poland	4th	Triple jump	14.02 m
2003	Universiade	Daegu, South Korea	5th	Triple jump	13.92 m
2005	European Indoor Championships	Madrid, Spain	13th (q)	Triple jump	13.69 m
2005	World Championships	Helsinki, Finland	17th (q)	Triple jump	13.84 m
2006	World Indoor Championships	Moscow, Russia	8th	Triple jump	13.76 m
2006	European Championships	Gothenburg, Sweden	24th (q)	Triple jump	11.44 m
2007	European Indoor Championships	Birmingham, United Kingdom	6th	Triple jump	14.13 m
2007	Universiade	Bangkok, Thailand	2nd	Triple jump	14.41 m (PB)
2007	World Championships	Osaka, Japan	10th	Triple jump	14.09 m
2007	World Athletics Final	Stuttgart, Germany	8th	Triple jump	13.81 m
2008	Olympic Games	Beijing, China	–	Triple jump	NM
2009	European Indoor Championships	Turin, Italy	3rd	Triple jump	14.40 m
2009	World Championships	Berlin, Germany	7th	Triple jump	14.25 m
2010	World Indoor Championships	Doha, Qatar	5th	Triple jump	14.18 m
2010	European Championships	Barcelona, Spain	7th	Triple jump	14.16 m
2011	European Indoor Championships	Paris, France	3rd	Triple jump	14.39 m
2011	World Championships	Daegu, South Korea	11th	Triple jump	13.96 m
2012	World Indoor Championships	Istanbul, Turkey	8th	Triple jump	13.97 m
2012	European Championships	Helsinki, Finland	5th	Triple jump	14.24 m
2012	Olympic Games	London, United Kingdom	11th	Triple jump	11.92 m
2013	European Indoor Championships	Gothenburg, Sweden	10th (q)	Triple jump	13.82 m
2013	World Championships	Moscow, Russia	11th	Triple jump	13.84 m
2014	World Indoor Championships	Sopot, Poland	8th	Triple jump	13.75 m
2014	European Championships	Zürich, Switzerland	6th	Triple jump	13.87 m
2015	European Indoor Championships	Prague, Czech Republic	10th (q)	Triple jump	13.89 m
2015	World Championships	Beijing, China	15th (q)	Triple jump	13.76 m
2016	European Championships	Amsterdam, Netherlands	11th	Triple jump	13.74 m
2016	Olympic Games	Rio de Janeiro, Brazil	17th (q)	Triple jump	13.98 m
2017	European Indoor Championships	Belgrade, Serbia	12th (q)	Triple jump	13.72 m
