= 2015 European Athletics Indoor Championships – Women's triple jump =

The women's triple jump event at the 2015 European Athletics Indoor Championships was held on 7 March at 10:05 (qualification) and on 8 March at 16:25 (final) local time.

== Medalists ==
Gold	Silver	Bronze
Yekaterina Koneva; Russia	Gabriela Petrova; Bulgaria	Hanna Knyazyeva-Minenko; Israel

== Results ==
=== Qualification ===
Qualification: Qualification Performance 14.15 (Q) or at least 8 best performers (q) qualified for the final.

Rank	Athlete	Nationality	#1	#2	#3	Result	Note
1	Hanna Knyazyeva-Minenko	Israel	14.40			14.40	Q, NR
2	Patrícia Mamona	Portugal	14.05	x	14.26	14.26	Q, SB
3	Natallia Viatkina	Belarus	13.96	13.80	14.21	14.21	Q, PB
4	Gabriela Petrova	Bulgaria	14.21			14.21	Q
5	Kristin Gierisch	Germany	14.20			14.20	Q
5	Yekaterina Koneva	Russia	14.20			14.20	Q
7	Kristiina Mäkelä	Finland	x	14.04	13.86	14.04	q
8	Cristina Bujin	Romania	14.02	13.65	13.99	14.02	q
9	Cristina Sandu	Romania	13.48	12.34	13.97	13.97	PB
10	Dana Velďáková	Slovakia	13.54	13.89	13.54	13.89	SB
11	Katja Demut	Germany	13.81	13.71	11.90	13.81	
12	Ruth Ndoumbe	Spain	x	13.80	x	13.80	
13	Lucie Májková	Czech Republic	13.79	13.78	13.50	13.79	PB
14	Susana Costa	Portugal	x	13.78	x	13.78	SB
15	Jeanine Assani Issouf	France	12.86	13.28	13.71	13.71	
16	Dovilė Dzindzaletaitė	Lithuania	13.67	x	13.38	13.67	
17	Elena Andreea Panturoiu	Romania	x	13.59	13.34	13.59	
18	Patricia Sarrapio	Spain	13.02	13.42	13.47	13.47	
19	Saša Babšek	Slovenia	x	13.41	13.46	13.46	
20	Tetyana Ptashkina	Ukraine	11.39	13.41	13.28	13.41	
21	Dariya Derkach	Italy	13.10	12.17	13.40	13.40	
22	Claudia Guri	Andorra	x	12.06	11.94	12.06	
	Andriana Bânova	Bulgaria				DNS	

=== Final ===
Rank	Athlete	Nationality	#1	#2	#3	#4	#5	#6	Result	Note
1st place, gold medalist(s)	Yekaterina Koneva	Russia	14.42	14.28	14.69	14.40	–	14.32	14.69	WL
2nd place, silver medalist(s)	Gabriela Petrova	Bulgaria	14.21	x	x	14.33	14.37	14.52	14.52	
3rd place, bronze medalist(s)	Hanna Knyazyeva-Minenko	Israel	14.49	14.48	14.46	14.20	14.18	13.93	14.49	NR
4	Kristin Gierisch	Germany	x	14.06	14.26	14.32	14.17	14.46	14.46	PB
5	Patrícia Mamona	Portugal	x	14.10	14.12	14.32	x	14.30	14.32	SB
6	Cristina Bujin	Romania	13.74	x	13.91	x	13.69	x	13.91	
7	Natallia Viatkina	Belarus	13.69	–	x	r	–	–	13.69	
8	Kristiina Mäkelä	Finland	x	x	13.40	13.66	x	x	13.66	
