= Snežana Rodić =

Slovenian triple jumper

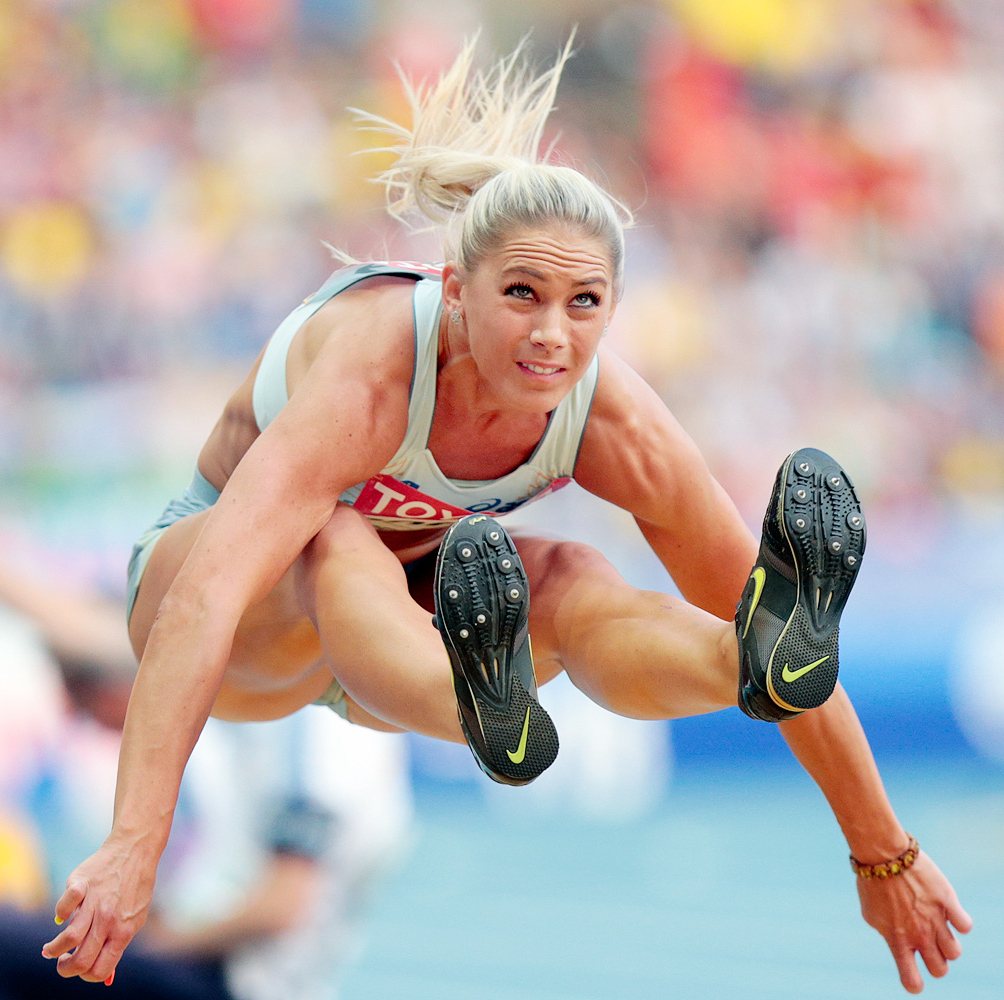
Snežana Rodić at 2013 World Championships in Athletics

Snežana Rodić (born 19 August 1982) is a Slovenian triple jumper.

She was born Snežana Vukmirović and married Aleksandar Rodić; she is variously referred to as Snežana Rodič, Snežana Rodić, Snežana Vukmirovič.

== Achievements ==
Year	Competition	Venue	Position	Event	Notes
Representing Slovenia
2003	European U23 Championships	Bydgoszcz, Poland	13th (q)	Long jump	6.25 m (wind: 0.0 m/s)
2003	European U23 Championships	Bydgoszcz, Poland	11th	Triple jump	12.89 m (wind: -0.8 m/s)
2005	Mediterranean Games	Almería, Spain	6th	Long jump	6.24
2005	Mediterranean Games	Almería, Spain	4th	Triple jump	14.08
2005	World Championships	Helsinki, Finland	16th	Triple jump	13.88
2009	World Championships	Berlin, Germany	19th	Triple jump	13.92
2010	World Indoor Championships	Doha, Qatar	9th	Triple jump	13.84
2010	European Championships	Barcelona, Spain	6th	Triple jump	14.32
2011	European Indoor Championships	Paris, France	4th	Triple jump	14.35
2012	World Indoor Championships	Istanbul, Turkey	–	Triple jump	NM
2012	European Championships	Helsinki, Finland	15th (q)	Triple jump	13.95
2013	Mediterranean Games	Mersin, Turkey	2nd	Triple jump	14.36
2013	World Championships	Moscow, Russia	9th	Triple jump	14.13
2014	European Championships	Zürich, Switzerland	7th	Triple jump	13.87
