= Natallia Viatkina =

Belarusian triple jumper

Personal information
- Born: 10 February 1987 (age 39)
- Height: 1.76 m (5 ft 9 1/2 in)
- Weight: 58 kg (128 lb)

Sport
- Country: Belarus
- Sport: Athletics
- Event: Women's Triple Jump

Natallia Viatkina (Belarusian: Натальля Вяткіна; born 10 February 1987) is a Belarusian triple jumper. She represented her country at the 2016 Summer Olympics without qualifying for the final.

== Achievements ==
Year	Competition	Venue	Position	Event	Notes
Representing Belarus
2006	World Junior Championships	Beijing, China	7th	Triple jump	13.35 m (+0.6 m/s)
2009	European Indoor Championships	Turin, Italy	16th (q)	Triple jump	13.69 m
2009	European U23 Championships	Kaunas, Lithuania	7th	Triple jump	13.70 m
2010	European Championships	Barcelona, Spain	9th	Triple jump	13.94 m
2011	Universiade	Shenzhen, China	6th	Triple jump	14.00 m
2013	World Championships	Moscow, Russia	21st (q)	Triple jump	13.19 m
2014	European Championships	Zürich, Switzerland	20th (q)	Triple jump	13.13 m
2015	European Indoor Championships	Prague, Czech Republic	7th	Triple jump	13.69 m
2016	European Championships	Amsterdam, Netherlands	21st (q)	Triple jump	13.35 m
2016	Olympic Games	Rio de Janeiro, Brazil	35th (q)	Triple jump	13.25 m
