= Kimberly Williams (triple jumper) =

Jamaican triple jumper

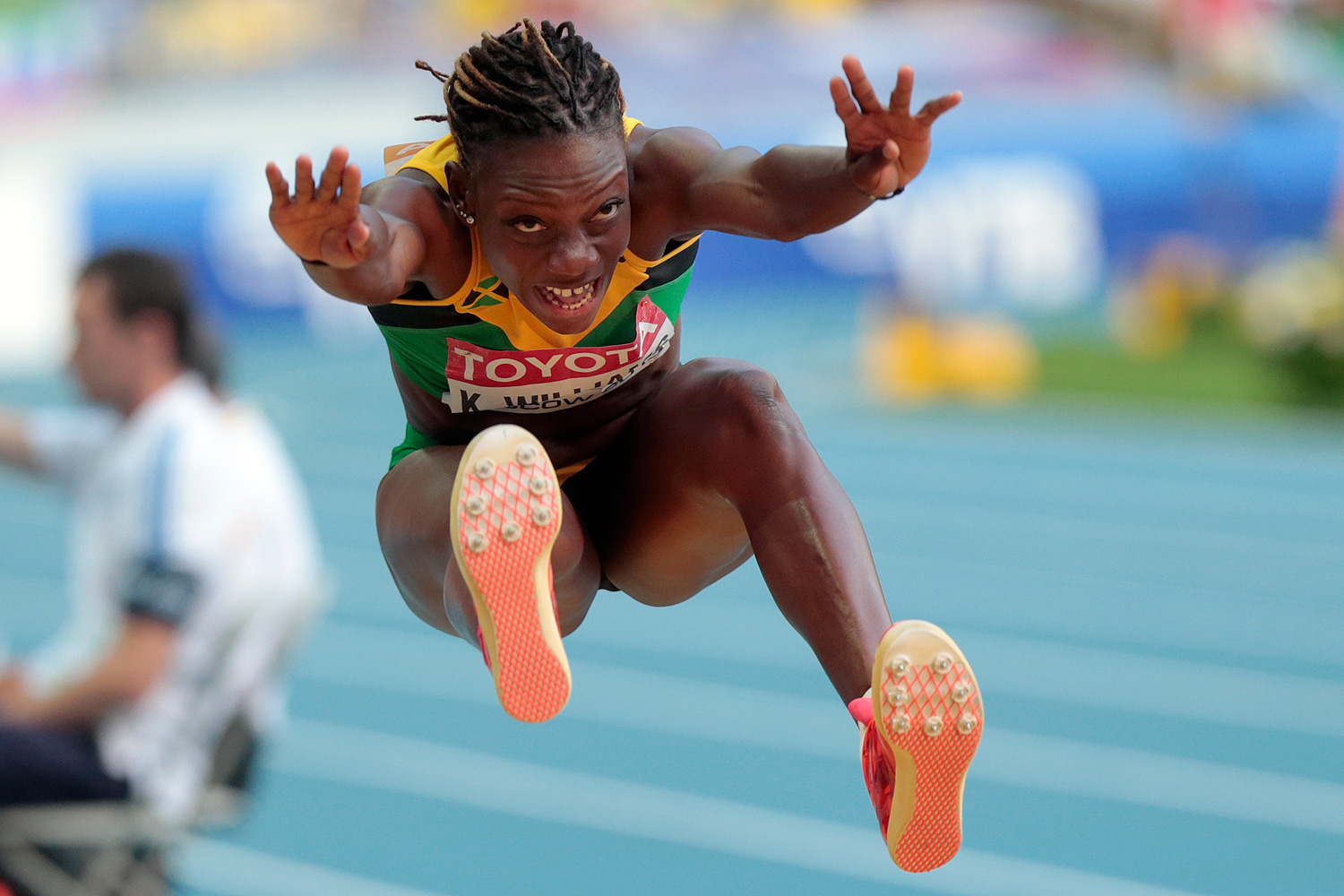
- Kimberly Williams at 2013 World Championships in Athletics

Personal information
- Born: 3 November 1988 (age 38) Saint Thomas, Jamaica
- Height: 1.70 m (5 ft 7 in)
- Weight: 61 kg (134 lb)

Sport
- Country: Jamaica
- Sport: Athletics
- Event: Triple jump
- College team: Florida State Seminoles
Medal record
World Indoor Championships
Silver medal – second place	2018 Birmingham	Triple jump]]
Bronze medal – third place	2014 Sopot	Triple jump]]
Bronze medal – third place	2022 Belgrade	Triple jump]]
Commonwealth Games
Gold medal – first place	2014 Glasgow	Triple jump]]
Gold medal – first place	2018 Gold Coast	Triple jump]]
Wanda Diamond League
Third place	2023 Eugene	Triple Jump
Third place	2021 Zurich	Triple Jump
Central American and Caribbean Games
Gold medal – first place	2010 Mayagüez	Triple jump
Bronze medal – third place	2009 Havana	Triple jump
Pan American Junior Championships
Silver medal – second place	2007 Sao Paulo	Triple jump
NACAC Under-23 Championships
Gold medal – first place	2010 Miramar	Triple jump
Central American and Caribbean Junior Championships
Silver medal – second place	2006 Port of Spain	Triple jump
Carifta Games
Gold medal – first place	2007 Providenciales	Triple jump
Gold medal – first place	2006 Les Abymes	Triple jump
Gold medal – first place	2004 Hamilton	Triple jump
Gold medal – first place	2003 Port of Spain	Triple jump
Silver medal – second place	2007 Providenciales	Long jump

Kimberly Williams (born 3 November 1988) is a Jamaican triple jumper. She is a multiple time Jamaican National Champion.

== Career ==
She was successful as a youth athlete, winning the 2003 CARIFTA Games (under 17 division) as a 14 year old. She was runner up at the 2007 Pan American Junior Athletics Championships.

Later, she jumped for Florida State University and was a four time NCAA Champion. By the time she graduated in 2012, she was "the most decorated women's track and field athlete in Florida State history. As a result, she was inducted into the college's hall of fame.

She is the 2014 Commonwealth Games champion in the triple jump. She was a finalist in the 2016 Olympics, ranking as high as 4th after two rounds of jumping, ultimately finishing seventh.

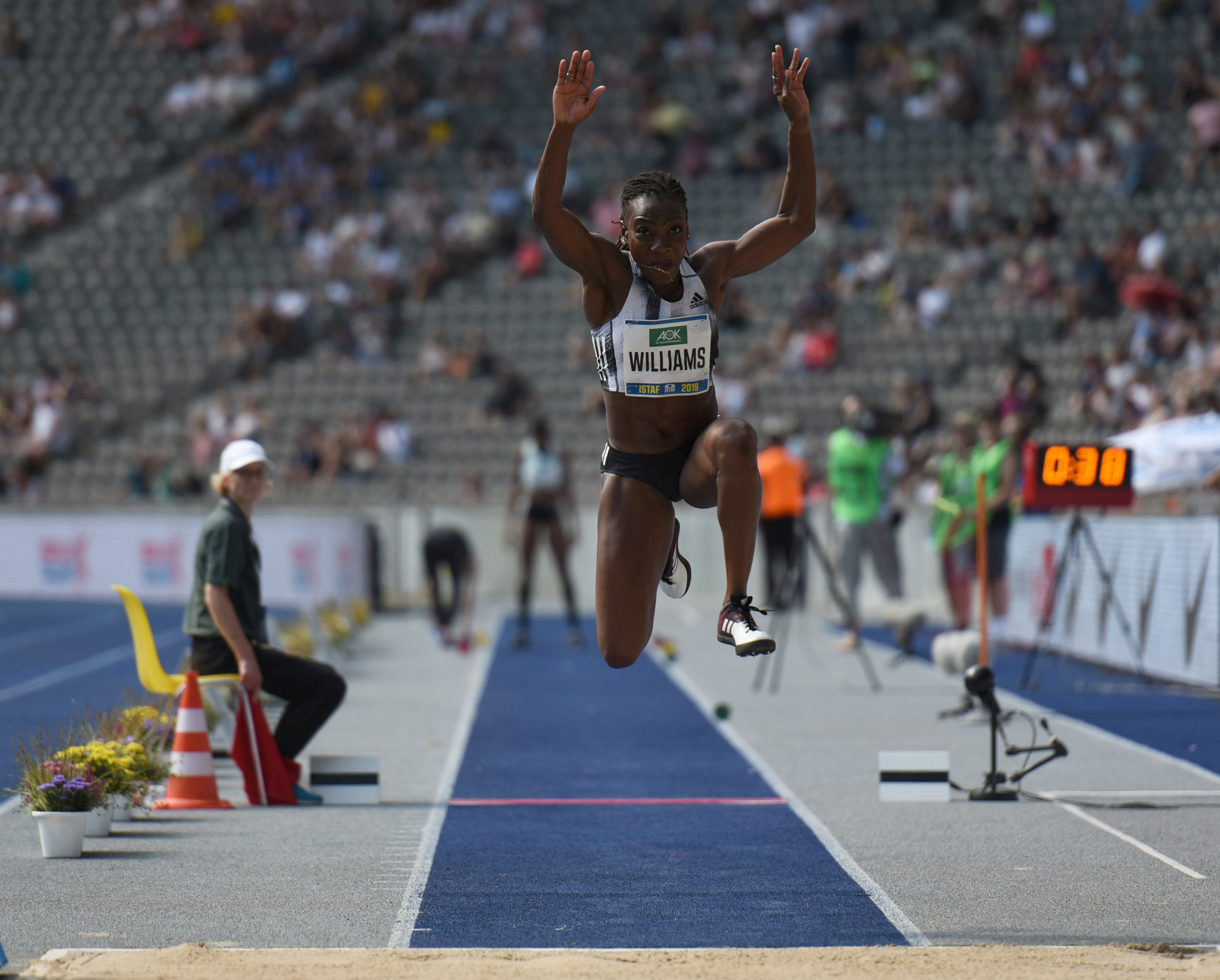
Williams in 2019

She represented Jamaica at the 2012 and 2020 Summer Olympics.

== International competitions ==
Year	Competition	Venue	Position	Event	Result
Representing Jamaica
2003	CARIFTA Games	Port of Spain, Trinidad	1st	Triple jump	12.18 m
2004	CARIFTA Games	Hamilton, Bermuda	1st	Triple jump	12.53 m
2006	CAC Juniors	Port of Spain, Trinidad	2nd	Triple jump	12.47 m
2006	CARIFTA Games	Les Abymes, Guadeloupe	1st	Triple jump	12.94 m
2006	World Junior Championships	Beijing, China	15th (q)	Triple jump	12.81 m
2007	Pan American Juniors	São Paulo, Brazil	2nd	Triple jump	13.38 m
2007	CARIFTA Games	Providenciales, Turks & Caicos	1st	Triple jump	12.85 m
2007	CARIFTA Games	Providenciales, Turks & Caicos	2nd	Long jump	6.15 m
2009	CAC Championships	Havana, Cuba	3rd	Triple jump	13.78 m
2009	World Championships	Berlin, Germany	15 (q)	Triple jump	14.08 m
2010	CAC Games	Mayagüez, Puerto Rico	1st	Triple jump	14.23 m
2010	NACAC Under-23	Miramar, United States	1st	Triple jump	14.14m
2011	World Championships	Daegu, South Korea	14th (q)	Triple jump	14.06 m
2012	World Indoor Championships	Istanbul, Turkey	5th	Triple jump	14.27 m
2013	World Championships	Moscow, Russia	4th	Triple jump	14.62 m
2014	World Indoor Championships	Sopot, Poland	3rd	Triple jump	14.39 m
2014	Commonwealth Games	Glasgow, United Kingdom	1st	Triple jump	14.21 m
2015	World Championships	Beijing, China	5th	Triple jump	14.45 m
2016	Olympic Games	Rio de Janeiro, Brazil	7th	Triple jump	14.53 m
2017	World Championships	London, United Kingdom	10th	Triple jump	14.01 m
2018	World Indoor Championships	Birmingham, United Kingdom	2nd	Triple jump	14.48 m
2018	Commonwealth Games	Gold Coast, Australia	1st	Triple jump	14.64 m
2019	Pan American Games	Lima, Peru	4th	Triple jump	14.15 m
2019	World Championships	Doha, Qatar	4th	Triple jump	14.64 m
2021	Olympic Games	Tokyo, Japan	8th	Triple jump	14.51 m
2022	World Indoor Championships	Belgrade, Serbia	3rd	Triple jump	14.62 m
2022	World Championships	Eugene, United States	7th	Triple jump	14.29 m
2023	World Championships	Budapest, Hungary	7th	Triple jump	14.38 m
2024	World Indoor Championships	Glasgow, United Kingdom	7th	Triple jump	14.07 m
2024	Olympic Games	Paris, France	20th (q)	Triple jump	13.77 m

== Personal bests ==
Outdoor

- Long jump – 6.42 (+1.1 m/s, Tallahassee 2009)
- Triple jump – 14.69 (+1.6 m/s, Doha 2021)

Indoor

- Long jump – 6.55 (Blacksburg 2011)
- Triple jump – 14.62 (Belgrade 2022)
