= Olha Saladukha =

Ukrainian triple jumper (born 1983)

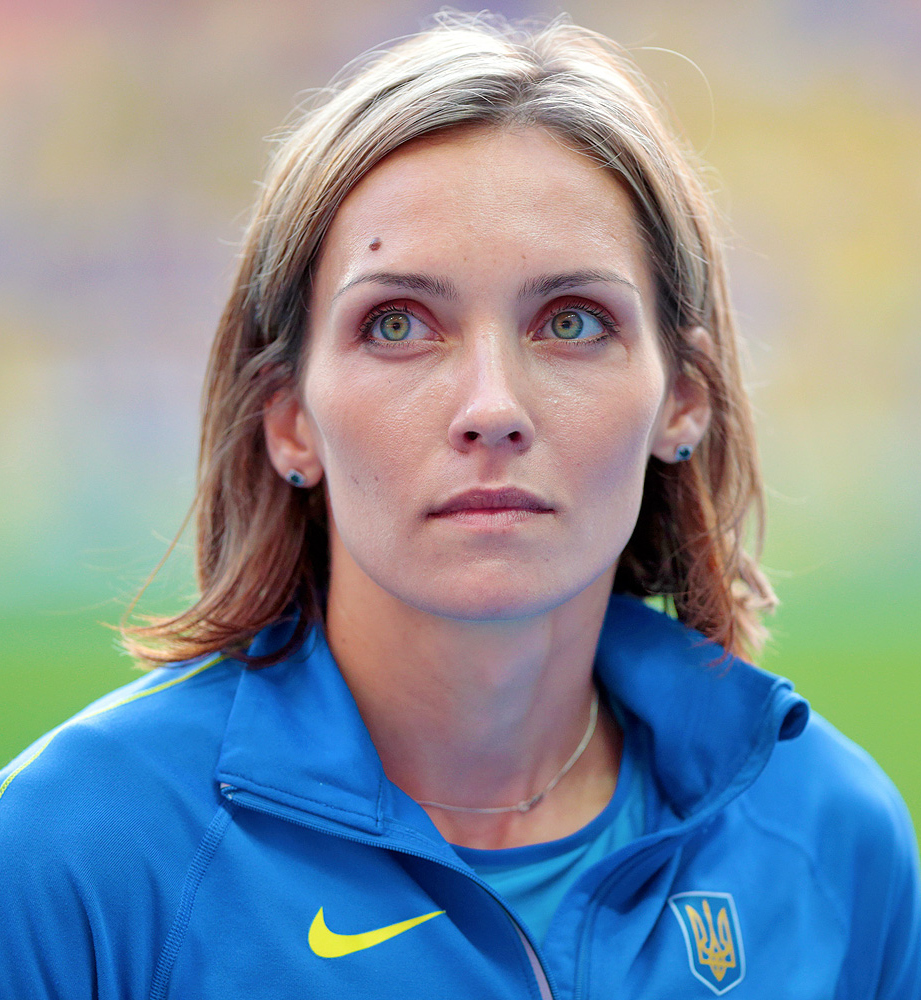
- Saladukha at the 2013 World Championships

Personal information
- Born: 4 June 1983 (age 43) Donetsk, Ukrainian SSR, Soviet Union
- Height: 1.76 m (5 ft 9 1/2 in)
- Weight: 58 kg (128 lb)

Sport
- Country: Ukraine
- Sport: Athletics
- Event: Triple jump
Medal record
Olympic Games
Bronze medal – third place	2012 London	Triple jump
World Championships
Gold medal – first place	2011 Daegu	Triple jump
Bronze medal – third place	2013 Moscow	Triple jump
World Indoor Championships
Silver medal – second place	2014 Sopot	Triple jump
Diamond League Final
Third place	2010	Triple jump
First place	2011	Triple jump
Second place	2012	Triple jump
Third place	2013	Triple jump
Second place	2014	Triple jump
European Championships
Gold medal – first place	2010 Barcelona	Triple jump
Gold medal – first place	2012 Helsinki	Triple jump
Gold medal – first place	2014 Zurich	Triple jump
European Indoor Championships
Gold medal – first place	2013 Gothenburg	Triple jump
Bronze medal – third place	2019 Glasgow	Triple jump
Universiade
Gold medal – first place	2007 Bangkok	Triple jump
Silver medal – second place	2005 İzmir	Triple jump
Continental Cup
Silver medal – second place	2010 Split	Triple jump
Bronze medal – third place	2014 Marrakesh	Triple jump
European Cup
Gold medal – first place	2006 Málaga	Triple jump
Gold medal – first place	2008 Annecy	Triple jump
European Athletics Team Championships
Gold medal – first place	2010 Bergen	Triple jump
Gold medal – first place	2011 Stockholm	Triple jump
Gold medal – first place	2013 Gateshead	Triple jump
Silver medal – second place	2014 Braunschweig	Triple jump

Olha Valeriivna Saladukha (Ukrainian: Ольга Валеріївна Саладуха, born 4 June 1983) is a Ukrainian former triple jumper. Since the 2019 Ukrainian parliamentary election she is a member of the Ukrainian parliament.

== Biography ==
Saladukha took up athletics at the same club as Sergey Bubka, originally as a sprint hurdler before switching to triple jumping. In 1998 she set a European age-group record of 13.32 meters. Subsequently, she finished fifth at the 2002 World Junior Championships in Athletics. After struggling with injuries for the next two years and briefly retiring from the sport, she made steady progress, finishing fourth at the 2006 European Athletics Championships and winning the gold at the 2007 Summer Universiade with a personal best of 14.79 meters.

At the end of 2008 Saladukha took a year out of competition to start a family, giving birth to a daughter, Diana. She subsequently returned to competition in 2010, winning gold at the European Championships in Barcelona. The following year she set a new personal best at the Diamond League meeting in Eugene, Oregon, where she jumped 14.98 meters, and she then went on to take the gold medal at the 2011 World Championships in Athletics in Daegu.

She won the bronze medal at the 2012 Olympic Games in London, and was European champion in the women's triple jump in 2010, 2012 and 2014.

Saladukha's personal best jump is 14.99 meters, achieved on 29 June 2012 in Helsinki at the European Championships. Her personal best in the long jump is 6.37 metres.

She is married to racing cyclist Denys Kostyuk.

Saladukha took part in the July 2019 Ukrainian parliamentary election with the party Servant of the People. She was elected to parliament.

== Achievements ==
Year	Competition	Venue	Position	Notes
Representing Ukraine
1999	World Youth Championships	Bydgoszcz, Poland	9th	12.76 m
2001	European Junior Championships	Grosseto, Italy	9th	13.07 m
2002	World Junior Championships	Kingston, Jamaica	5th	13.17 m (wind: +0.4 m/s)
2005	European U23 Championships	Erfurt, Germany	4th	13.93 m (wind: +0.2 m/s)
2005	Universiade	İzmir, Turkey	2nd	13.96 m
2006	European Championships	Gothenburg, Sweden	4th	14.38 m
2006	World Athletics Final	Stuttgart, Germany	6th	14.04 m
2006	World Cup	Athens, Greece	6th	14.16 m
2007	Universiade	Bangkok, Thailand	1st	14.79 m (PB)
2007	World Championships	Osaka, Japan	7th	14.60 m
2008	World Indoor Championships	Valencia, Spain	6th	14.32 m
2008	Olympic Games	Beijing, China	9th	14.70 m
2010	Continental Cup	Split, Croatia	2nd	14.70 m
2010	European Championships	Barcelona, Spain	1st	14.81 m (EL)
2011	World Championships	Daegu, South Korea	1st	14.94 m
2012	European Championships	Helsinki, Finland	1st	14.99 m (WL, PB)
2012	Olympic Games	London, United Kingdom	3rd	14.79 m
2013	European Indoor Championships	Gothenburg, Sweden	1st	14.88 m (WL, NR)
2013	World Championships	Moscow, Russia	3rd	14.65 m
2014	World Indoor Championships	Sopot, Poland	2nd	14.45 m
2014	European Championships	Zurich, Switzerland	1st	14.73 m
2014	Continental Cup	Marrakesh, Morocco	3rd	14.26 m
2015	World Championships	Beijing, China	6th	14.41 m
2016	European Championships	Amsterdam, Netherlands	6th	14.23 m
2016	Olympic Games	Rio de Janeiro, Brazil	18th (q)	13.97 m
2018	European Championships	Berlin, Germany	13th (q)	14.04 m
2019	European Indoor Championships	Glasgow, United Kingdom	3rd	14.47 m
2019	World Championships	Doha, Qatar	5th	14.52 m
2021	Olympic Games	Tokyo, Japan	20th (q)	13.91 m

== Personal bests ==
Type	Event	Time	Date	Place	Notes
Outdoor	Long Jump	6.37 m	14 May 2006	Rio de Janeiro, Brazil	
Outdoor	Triple Jump	14.99 m	29 June 2012	Helsinki, Finland	
Indoor	Long Jump	6.31 m	22 February 2006	Sumy, Ukraine	
Indoor	Triple Jump	14.88 m	29 June 2013	Gothenburg, Sweden	

- All information taken from IAAF profile.

== See also ==
- Triple jump - Women's seasons best
- List of members of the parliament of Ukraine, 2019–24
