= Keila Costa =

Brazilian athlete (born 1983)

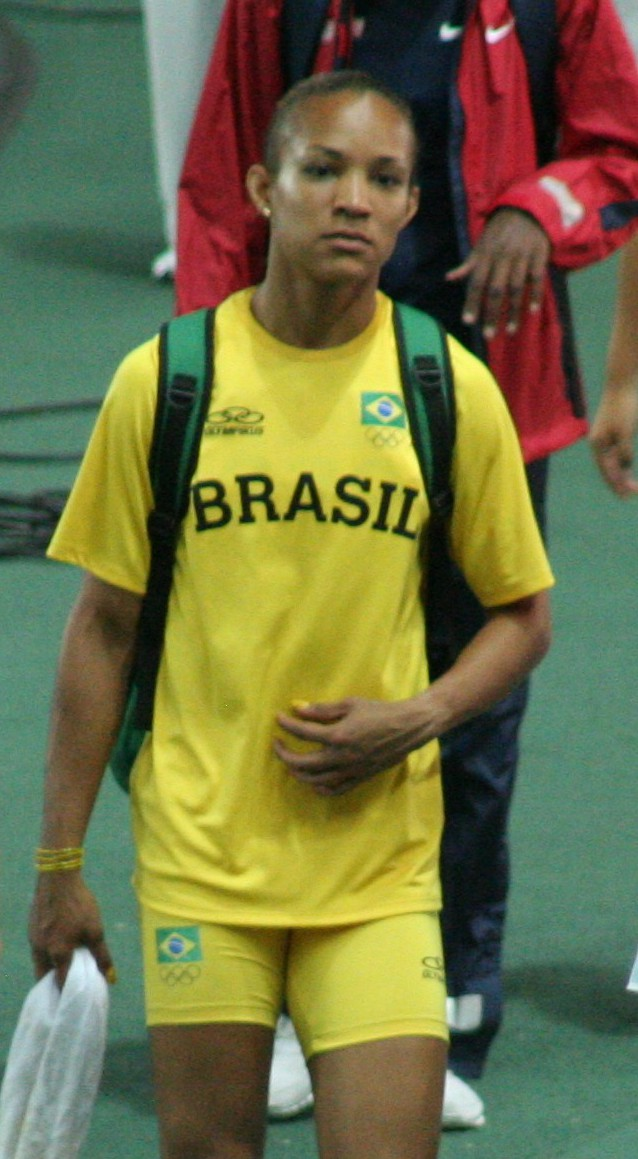
- Costa at the World Championships in 2007

Personal information
- Full name: Keila da Silva da Costa
- Born: 6 February 1983 (age 43) Abreu e Lima, Pernambuco, Brazil
- Height: 1.70 m (5 ft 7 in)
- Weight: 62 kg (137 lb)

Sport
- Country: Brazil
- Sport: Track and field
- Event: Triple jump
Medal record
Women's athletics
Representing Brazil
World Indoor Championships
Bronze medal – third place	2010 Doha	Long jump
Pan American Games
Silver medal – second place	2007 Rio de Janeiro	Long jump
Silver medal – second place	2007 Rio de Janeiro	Triple jump
Silver medal – second place	2015 Toronto	Triple jump
South American Games
Gold medal – first place	2002 Manaus	Long jump
Gold medal – first place	2002 Manaus	Triple jump
Gold medal – first place	2014 Santiago	Long jump
Gold medal – first place	2014 Santiago	Triple jump
Military World Games
Gold medal – first place	2011 Rio de Janeiro	Long jump
Silver medal – second place	2011 Rio de Janeiro	Triple jump
Lusophony Games
Silver medal – second place	2009 Lisbon	Long jump
Ibero-American Championships
Gold medal – first place	2006 Ponce	Long jump
Bronze medal – third place	2004 Huelva	Triple jump
South American Championships
Gold medal – first place	2001 Manaus	Triple jump
Gold medal – first place	2003 Barquisimeto	Long jump
Gold medal – first place	2003 Barquisimeto	Triple jump
Gold medal – first place	2007 São Paulo	Triple jump
Gold medal – first place	2009 Lima	Long jump
Gold medal – first place	2013 Cartagena	Triple jump
Silver medal – second place	2005 Cali	Long jump
Silver medal – second place	2005 Cali	Triple jump
Silver medal – second place	2007 São Paulo	Long jump
Silver medal – second place	2011 Buenos Aires	Long jump
Silver medal – second place	2011 Buenos Aires	Triple jump
Silver medal – second place	2013 Cartagena	Long jump
World Junior Championships
Bronze medal – third place	2002 Kingston	Triple jump
South American U-23 Championships
Gold medal – first place	2004 Barquisimeto	Long jump
Gold medal – first place	2004 Barquisimeto	Triple jump
Pan American Junior Championships
Silver medal – second place	2001 Santa Fé	Triple jump
Bronze medal – third place	2001 Santa Fé	Long jump
South American Junior Championships
Gold medal – first place	2000 São Leopoldo	Triple jump
Gold medal – first place	2001 Santa Fé	Long jump
Gold medal – first place	2001 Santa Fé	Triple jump
Bronze medal – third place	1999 Concepción	Triple jump
South American Youth Championships
Gold medal – first place	2000 Bogotá	Long jump
Gold medal – first place	2000 Bogotá	Triple jump
- Updated on 19 October 2015

Keila da Silva Costa (born 6 February 1983) is a Brazilian long jumper and triple jumper. She has competed in three Olympic Games, 2004, 2008 and 2012, and has reached the final round both there and in World Championships and World Indoor Championships. She is the South American record holder in triple jump with 14.58 metres, and has 6.88 metres in the long jump. Both results were achieved in 2007.

== Early career ==
She was born in Abreu e Lima near Recife, and took up athletics at the age of nine. It was not the easiest of things to become an international athlete, as the city of Abreu e Lima did not sport a rubber track; also she came from a "humble family".

As a junior athlete she competed in two World Junior Championships. At the 2000 edition in Santiago, Chile she finished eleventh in the triple jump. Her personal best at the time was 13.23 metres. In 2001, she broke the 14-metre barrier as she improved to 14.00 metres at a meet in São Caetano do Sul. This was a new South American junior record.^{[i]} In 2002 the World Junior Championships were held in Kingston, Jamaica. Here she finished ninth in the long jump and won the bronze medal in the triple jump. She was the first Brazilian to win a medal at the World Junior Championships. She had not improved in the latter event, but her personal best in the long jump was 6.46 metres, achieved in September 2002 in Rio de Janeiro.

In the following seasons, she rarely competed internationally, except for a participation at the 2004 Olympic Games where she failed to reach the final. She was injured for most of 2003. By June 2005 she had improved to 6.63 metres in the long jump, and in February 2006 she improved to 14.17 metres in the triple jump. In March 2006 she competed in triple jump at the World Indoor Championships and her first international triple jump event since the 2002 World Juniors—but even though she approached her maximum level with a jump of 14.11 metres, she again failed to reach the final. In late 2006, she represented the Americas (except for the United States) in long jump at the World Cup event, finishing sixth.

Maurren Higa Maggi later captured the South American triple jump record, and also dominated in national championships. Costa won her first Brazilian title in 2003. On the regional level, Costa won five medals at the South American Championships in 2001, 2003 and 2005.

== International breakthrough ==
Her definite international breakthrough came in 2007. She improved both her personal best jumps with good margins. In May in Belém she jumped 6.88 metres, and in São Paulo in June she jumped 14.57 metres for a continental and championship record at the 2007 South American Championships in Athletics. She also won the silver medal in the long jump behind Maggi. In May she had become the first South American woman to break the 15-metre-barrier. However, her 15.10 m jump in Uberlândia, Brazil had a tail wind of 2.7 m/second, and thus could not be accepted. When jumping 14.57, she established a new South American record. At the 2007 Pan American Games she won two silver medals, and at the 2007 World Championships in August she finished ninth in the triple and seventh in the long jump competition. At the World Athletics Final towards the end of the season, she finished sixth in the triple and fifth in the long jump.

In 2008, she did not compete in the triple jump at all. In the long jump, though, she finished seventh at the World Indoor Championships and eleventh at the Olympic Games. Her season's best was 6.79 metres, achieved in June in São Paulo. Her South American record still stands.

In the 2009 season, she won the Troféu Brasil Caixa de Atletismo with a season's best of 6.79 m, putting an end to rival Maurren Maggi's decade-long dominance of the championships. She became the continental long jump champion for a second time at the 2009 South American Championships in Athletics. The long jump at the 2009 Lusophony Games was a head-to-head with Portugal's Naide Gomes and Costa took the silver medal, three centimetres back with a mark of 6.71 m. Her focus turned to the 2009 World Championships in Athletics, but she failed to record a mark in her three attempts in the long jump final. She closed the season with a seventh-place finish at the 2009 IAAF World Athletics Final.

She opened 2010 with her first podium finish on the global stage: competing in the long jump at the 2010 IAAF World Indoor Championships, she twice jumped 6.63 m to secure the bronze medal behind Brittney Reese and Gomes. She became a double Brazilian champion later that year with victories in both the long jump and triple jump at the Troféu Brasil Caixa de Atletismo.

== Personal life ==
Costa has a relationship with Panamanian Olympic champion in the long jump, Irving Saladino. The two met at the 2004 Olympic Games.

Costa stands 1.70 m (5 ft 7 in) tall, and weighs approximately 137 pounds (62 kg).

== Notes ==
^i Note that this is sometimes given, wrongly, as being a South American record. The best South American result at the time belonged to Luciana dos Santos, who jumped 14.01 metres in 2000.

== Personal bests ==
Event	Result	Venue	Date
Outdoor
100 m	12.43 s (wind: +0.5 m/s)	Belém, Brazil	6 May 2005
Long jump	6.88 m (wind: -0.1 m/s)	Belém, Brazil	20 May 2007
Triple jump	14.58 m (wind: +2.0 m/s)	São Paulo, Brazil	7 June 2013
Indoor
Long jump	6.64 m	Paris, France	13 February 2009
Triple jump	14.11 m	Moscow, Russia	10 March 2006

== Achievements ==
Year	Competition	Venue	Position	Event	Notes
Representing Brazil
1999	South American Junior Championships	Concepción, Chile	3rd	Triple jump	12.62 m
2000	South American Junior Championships	São Leopoldo, Brazil	1st	Triple jump	13.65 m
2000	World Junior Championships	Santiago, Chile	11th	Triple jump	12.97 m (wind: +0.9 m/s)
2000	South American Youth Championships	Bogotá, Colombia	1st	Long jump	6.05 m A
2000	South American Youth Championships	Bogotá, Colombia	1st	Triple jump	13.04 m A
2001	South American Championships	Manaus, Brazil	1st	Triple jump	13.61 m
2001	South American Junior Championships	Santa Fe, Argentina	1st	Long jump	6.20 m
2001	South American Junior Championships	Santa Fe, Argentina	1st	Triple jump	13.66 m
2001	Pan American Junior Championships	Santa Fe, Argentina	3rd	Long jump	5.97m
2001	Pan American Junior Championships	Santa Fe, Argentina	2nd	Triple jump	13.55 m
2002	World Junior Championships	Kingston, Jamaica	17th (q)	Long jump	5.98 m (wind: +1.1 m/s)
2002	World Junior Championships	Kingston, Jamaica	3rd	Triple jump	13.70 m (wind: +0.5 m/s)
2002	South American Junior Championships / South American Games	Belém, Brazil	1st	Long jump	6.37 m (wind: +1.4 m/s)
2002	South American Junior Championships / South American Games	Belém, Brazil	1st	Triple jump	13.78 m (wind: -0.5 m/s)
2003	South American Championships	Barquisimeto, Venezuela	1st	Long jump	6.30 m
2003	South American Championships	Barquisimeto, Venezuela	1st	Triple jump	13.62 m
2004	South American U23 Championships	Barquisimeto, Venezuela	1st	Long jump	6.19 m (wind: +1.6 m/s)
2004	South American U23 Championships	Barquisimeto, Venezuela	1st	Triple jump	13.62 m (wind: +0.3 m/s)
2004	Ibero-American Championships	Huelva, Spain	6th	Long jump	6.27 m
2004	Ibero-American Championships	Huelva, Spain	3rd	Triple jump	13.80 m
2004	Olympic Games	Athens, Greece	31st (q)	Long jump	6.33 m
2005	South American Championships	Cali, Colombia	2nd	Long jump	6.32 m
2005	South American Championships	Cali, Colombia	2nd	Triple jump	13.75 m
2006	World Indoor Championships	Moscow, Russia	10th (q)	Triple jump	14.11 m
2006	Ibero-American Championships	Ponce, Puerto Rico	1st	Long jump	6.54 m
2006	World Cup	Athens, Greece	7th	Long jump	6.33 m (wind: +0.2 m/s)
2007	South American Championships	São Paulo, Brazil	2nd	Long jump	6.83 m
2007	South American Championships	São Paulo, Brazil	1st	Triple jump	14.57 m
2007	Pan American Games	Rio de Janeiro, Brazil	2nd	Long jump	6.73 m
2007	Pan American Games	Rio de Janeiro, Brazil	2nd	Triple jump	14.38 m
2007	World Championships	Osaka, Japan	7th	Long jump	6.69 m
2007	World Championships	Osaka, Japan	9th	Triple jump	14.40 m
2007	World Athletics Final	Stuttgart, Germany	5th	Long jump	6.46 m (wind: +0.4 m/s)
2007	World Athletics Final	Stuttgart, Germany	6th	Triple jump	14.13 m (wind: +0.5 m/s)
2008	World Indoor Championships	Valencia, Spain	7th	Long jump	6.48 m
2008	Olympic Games	Beijing, China	11th	Long jump	6.43 m
2009	South American Championships	Lima, Peru	1st	Long jump	6.62 m
2009	Lusophony Games	Lisbon, Portugal	2nd	Long jump	6.71 m (w)
2009	World Championships	Berlin, Germany	7th (q)	Long jump	6.66 m
2009	World Athletics Final	Thessaloniki, Greece	7th	Long jump	6.53 m w (wind: +3.1 m/s)
2010	World Indoor Championships	Doha, Qatar	3rd	Long jump	6.63 m
2011	South American Championships	Buenos Aires, Argentina	2nd	Long jump	6.45 m
2011	South American Championships	Buenos Aires, Argentina	2nd	Triple jump	13.96 m
2011	Military World Games	Rio de Janeiro, Brazil	1st	Long jump	6.41 m (wind: +0.1 m/s)
2011	Military World Games	Rio de Janeiro, Brazil	2nd	Triple jump	14.11 m (wind: +0.0 m/s)
2011	Universiade	Shenzhen, China	11th	Long jump	6.19 m
2011	World Championships	Daegu, South Korea	24th (q)	Long jump	6.26 m
2011	World Championships	Daegu, South Korea	12th	Triple jump	13.72 m
2011	Pan American Games	Guadalajara, Mexico	5th	Long jump	6.37 m
2011	Pan American Games	Guadalajara, Mexico	4th	Triple jump	14.01 m
2012	World Indoor Championships	Istanbul, Turkey	11th (q)	Long jump	6.45 m
2012	Olympic Games	London, United Kingdom	20th (q)	Triple jump	13.84 m
2013	South American Championships	Cartagena, Colombia	2nd	Long jump	6.49 m
2013	South American Championships	Cartagena, Colombia	1st	Triple jump	14.21 m (w)
2013	World Championships	Moscow, Russia	13th (q)	Triple jump	13.82 m
2014	World Indoor Championships	Sopot, Poland	10th (q)	Triple jump	13.64 m
2014	South American Games	Santiago, Chile	1st	Long jump	6.35 m
2014	South American Games	Santiago, Chile	1st	Triple jump	13.65 m
2014	Pan American Sports Festival	Mexico City, Mexico	4th	Triple jump	13.95m A (wind: +0.5 m/s)
2015	Pan American Games	Toronto, Canada	2nd	Triple jump	14.50 m (w)
2015	World Championships	Beijing, China	26th (q)	Long jump	6.32 m
2015	World Championships	Beijing, China	12th	Triple jump	13.90 m
2016	World Indoor Championships	Portland, United States	9th	Triple jump	13.94 m
2016	Ibero-American Championships	Rio de Janeiro, Brazil	2nd	Long jump	6.43 m
2016	Ibero-American Championships	Rio de Janeiro, Brazil	1st	Triple jump	14.01 m
2016	Olympic Games	Rio de Janeiro, Brazil	38th (q)	Long jump	5.86 m
2016	Olympic Games	Rio de Janeiro, Brazil	24th (q)	Triple jump	13.78 m
2019	South American Championships	Lima, Peru	2nd	Long jump	6.38 m
2021	South American Championships	Guayaquil, Ecuador	1st	Triple jump	13.67 m
