= Gabriela Petrova =

Bulgarian triple jumper (born 1992)

Personal information
- Nationality: Bulgarian
- Born: 29 June 1992 (age 34) Haskovo, Bulgaria
- Height: 1.68 m (5 ft 6 in)
- Weight: 62 kg (137 lb)

Sport
- Country: Bulgaria
- Sport: Track and field
- Event: Triple jump

Gabriela Petrova (Bulgarian: Габриела Петрова; born 29 June, 1992 in Haskovo) is a Bulgarian athlete specialising in the triple jump.

== Career ==
She won the silver medal at the 2015 European Indoor Championships in Prague. In addition, she finished fifth at the 2014 European Championships in Zürich.

Her personal bests in the triple jump are 14.66 metres outdoors (Beijing 2015) and 14.55 metres indoors (Dobrich 2015).

Petrova is the holder of a European title for the under 23 age group.

== Competition record ==
Year	Competition	Venue	Position	Event	Notes
Representing Bulgaria
2009	World Youth Championships	Brixen, Italy	18th (q)	Triple jump	12.46 m
2010	World Junior Championships	Moncton, Canada	16th (q)	Triple jump	12.74 m
2011	European Junior Championships	Tallinn, Estonia	5th	Triple jump	13.00 m
2013	European U23 Championships	Tampere, Finland	1st	Triple jump	13.91 m
2014	European Championships	Zürich, Switzerland	5th	Triple jump	14.13 m
2015	European Indoor Championships	Prague, Czech Republic	2nd	Triple jump	14.52 m
2015	World Championships	Beijing, China	4th	Triple jump	14.66 m
2016	European Championships	Amsterdam, Netherlands	20th (q)	Triple jump	13.46 m
2016	Olympic Games	Rio de Janeiro, Brazil	22nd (q)	Triple jump	13.92 m
2017	World Championships	London, United Kingdom	17th (q)	Triple jump	13.90 m
2018	World Indoor Championships	Birmingham, United Kingdom	11th	Triple jump	13.91 m
2018	European Championships	Berlin, Germany	6th	Triple jump	14.26 m
2019	World Championships	Doha, Qatar	16th (q)	Triple jump	13.98 m
2021	Olympic Games	Tokyo, Japan	22nd (q)	Triple jump	13.79 m
2024	European Championships	Rome, Italy	6th	Triple jump	14.16 m
2024	Olympic Games	Paris, France	21st (q)	Triple jump	13.77 m
2025	European Indoor Championships	Apeldoorn, Netherlands	7th	Triple jump	13.51 m
2025	World Championships	Tokyo, Japan	14th (q)	Triple jump	13.86 m
2026	European Championships	Birmingham, United Kingdom	11th	Triple jump	13.75 m (w)
