= Ekaterina Koneva =

Russian triple jumper

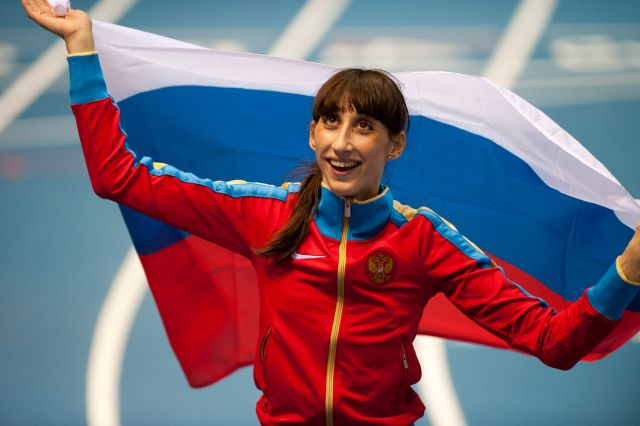
- Koneva at the 2014 IAAF World Indoor Championships.

Personal information
- Born: 25 September 1988 (age 37) Khabarovsk, Russian SFSR

Sport
- Country: Russia
- Sport: Women's athletics
Medal record
World Championships
Silver medal – second place	2013 Moscow	Triple jump
World Indoor Championships
Gold medal – first place	2014 Sopot	Triple jump
Military World Games
Gold medal – first place	2015 Mungyeong	Long jump
Gold medal – first place	2015 Mungyeong	Triple jump
European Championships
Silver medal – second place	2014 Zürich	Triple jump
European Indoor Championships
Gold medal – first place	2015 Praha	Triple Jump
Universiade
Gold medal – first place	2011 Shenzhen	Triple jump
Gold medal – first place	2013 Kazan	Triple jump
Gold medal – first place	2015 Gwangju	Triple jump

Ekaterina Koneva (Russian: Екатерина Конева; born 25 September 1988) is a Russian track and field athlete who competes in the triple jump. She is a triple-time gold medalist at the Summer Universiade. Her personal best for the event is 15.04 m (49 ft 4 in).

== Career ==
Born in Khabarovsk in the Russian SFSR, she started out as a sprint and long jump specialist. She failed an in-competition doping test in February 2007 for excess testosterone and was banned from competition for two years. She returned from the ban in 2009 and set personal bests of 11.76 seconds for the 100 metres and 23.89 seconds for the 200 metres. She switched to focus on the triple jump in 2010 and won the Russian under-23 title and came second at the under-23 Spartakiad.

Koneva cleared fourteen metres for the first time in 2011 setting an indoor best of 14.18 metres at the Russian Indoor Athletics Championships. Two personal bests came in Bryansk, where she had 6.70 m in the long jump and 14.46 m in the triple jump. She placed third at the Russian Athletics Championships before going on to take the gold medal at the Universiade. At the start of 2012 she cleared a personal best of 14.60 m – a mark which ranked her tenth in the world for the triple jump that year. She came third at the Russian indoor championships but fared less well outdoors, managing only tenth at the Russian Championships.

Further improvements came in 2013: she won at the Russian team championships with a best of 14.80 m and she was runner-up at the 2013 European Team Championships. She improved this by two centimetres to defend her triple jump title at the Universiade in Kazan, setting a Games record in the process. She was also victorious at the Brothers Znamensky Memorial – one of the top annual meets in Russia. She claimed her first win on the IAAF Diamond League circuit with a jump of 14.52 m at the London Grand Prix.

== International competitions ==
Representing Russia
Year	Competition	Venue	Position	Event	Result	Notes
2011	Universiade	Shenzhen, China	1st	Triple jump	14.25 m	
2013	Universiade	Kazan, Russia	1st	Triple jump	14.82 m	
2013	World Championships	Moscow, Russia	2nd	Triple jump	14.81 m	
2014	World Indoor Championships	Sopot, Poland	1st	Triple jump	14.46 m	
2014	European Championships	Zürich, Switzerland	2nd	Triple jump	14.69 m	
2015	European Indoor Championships	Prague, Czech Republic	1st	Triple jump	14.69 m	
2015	Universiade	Gwangju, South Korea	1st	Triple jump	14.60 m	
2015	World Championships	Beijing, China	7th	Triple jump	14.37 m	
2015	Military World Games	Mungyeong, South Korea	1st	Long jump	6.39 m	
2015	Military World Games	Mungyeong, South Korea	1st	Triple jump	14.28 m	

== See also ==
- List of doping cases in athletics
- List of World Athletics Championships medalists (women)
- List of European Athletics Championships medalists (women)
- List of European Athletics Indoor Championships medalists (women)
- List of IAAF World Indoor Championships medalists (women)
