= Anastasiya Taranova-Potapova =

Russian triple jumper (born 1985)

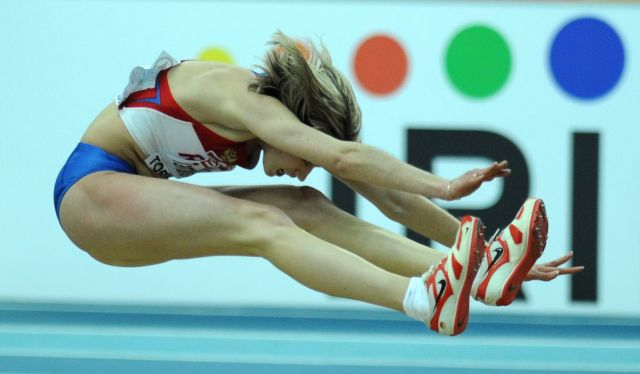
Anastasiya Taranova-Potapova (Turin 2009)

Anastasiya Taranova-Potapova (Russian: Анастасия Таранова-Потапова; born 6 September 1985) is a Russian triple jumper.

Taranova-Potapova won the gold medals at the 2003 European Athletics Junior Championships, the 2004 World Junior Championships and the 2009 European Athletics Indoor Championships.

Taranova-Potapova's personal best jump is 14.40 metres, achieved in June 2009 in Chania. She has 14.68 metres on the indoor track, achieved at the 2009 European Indoor Championships in Turin. She also has 6.71 metres in the long jump, achieved in February 2009 in Moscow.
