= 2005 World Youth Championships in Athletics =

- Host city: Marrakesh, Morocco
- Events: 39
- Dates: 13–17 July
- Main venue: Stade Sidi Youssef Ben Ali

The 2005 World Youth Championships in Athletics were held in Marrakesh, Morocco on July 13–July 17. The host stadium was Stade Sidi Youssef Ben Ali.

The boy's 400 metres hurdles event was initially won by Sudan's Abdulagadir Idriss in a time of 50.78 seconds, but this was later annulled due to Idriss failing a doping control.

== Results ==
=== Boys ===
Event	Gold		Silver		Bronze	
100 m	Harry Aikines-Aryeetey; Great Britain	10.35 PB	Alexander Nelson; Great Britain	10.36	Keston Bledman; Trinidad and Tobago	10.55
200 m	Harry Aikines-Aryeetey; Great Britain	20.91 WYL	Jorge Valcárcel; Cuba	21.08 PB	Matteo Galvan; Italy	21.14 PB
400 m	Adam El-Nour; Sudan	46.56 PB	Julius Kirwa; Kenya	46.70 PB	Bryshon Nellum; United States	46.81 PB
800 m	Gilbert Keter Kipkurui; Kenya	1:48.42 CR	Jackson Kivuva; Kenya	1:48.57 PB	Jan Masenamela; South Africa	1:49.73 NJR
1500 m	Belal Mansoor Ali; Bahrain	3:36.98	Bader Khalil Bader; Bahrain	3:43.70 PB	Abubaker Kaki Khamis; Sudan	3:45.06 PB
3000 m	Abreham Cherkos; Ethiopia	8:00.90	Ibrahim Jeilan; Ethiopia	8:04.21 PB	Saleh Bakheet Marzooq; Bahrain	8:04.78
2000 m St.	Abel Mutai Kiprop; Kenya	5:24.69 WYR	Bisluke Kiplagat; Kenya	5:24.87 PB	Abdelghani Aït Bahmad; Morocco	5:26.52 PB
110 m H 91.4 cm	Cordera Jenkins; United States	13.35 PB	Ryan Brathwaite; Barbados	13.44	Gianni Frankis; Great Britain	13.48 PB
400 m H 84.0 cm	Mohammed Daak; Saudi Arabia	50.90 PB	David Klech; United States	50.90 PB	Adel Jaber Asseri; Saudi Arabia	51.68
10,000 m track walk	Sergey Morozov; Russia	42:26.92	Vladimir Akhmetov; Russia	42:32.81	Yusuke Suzuki; Japan	42:43.22 PB
Medley relay	United States; Isaiah Green; Devin Mays; Zach Chandy; Bryshon Nellum	1:51.19 WYL	Trinidad and Tobago; Kieron Anthony; Keston Bledman; Ade Alleyne-Forte; Kervin Morgan	1:52.51 PB	Saudi Arabia; M. Hadi Hassan; Mohammed Ali Al-Beshi; M.H Ismail Al-Sabani; Jaber Adel Asseri	1:52.89 PB
High jump	Huang Haiqiang; China	2.27 CR	Oleksandr Nartov; Ukraine	2.18	Alex Soto; Spain	2.18 PB
Pole vault	Yang Yansheng; China	5.25 CR	Scott Roth; United States	5.25 CR	Albert Velez; Spain	5.20
Long jump	Chris Noffke; Australia	7.97w	Tiberiu Talnar; Romania	7.53w	Cleiton Sabino; Brazil	7.49 PB
Triple jump	Héctor Dairo Fuentes; Cuba	16.63 CR	Ilya Efremov; Russia	16.45 PB	Zhivko Petkov; Bulgaria	16.20
Shot put 5 kg	Jan Petrus Hoffman; South Africa	20.99 WYL	Vladislav Tuláček; Czech Republic	19.97	Rosen Karamfilov; Bulgaria	19.86
Discus 1.500 kg	Ali Shahrokhi; Iran	61.07 PB	Osmel Charlot; Cuba	60.17 PB	Antonio e Silva Vital; Portugal	59.30
Hammer 5 kg	Sandor Palhegyi; Hungary	81.89 CR	Artem Vynnyk; Ukraine	77.88	Alex Smith; Great Britain	73.77
Javelin 700g	Noël Meyer; South Africa	80.52 WYL	Roman Avramenko; Ukraine	79.22 PB	Víctor Fatecha; Paraguay	77.21 PB
Octathlon	Yordanis García; Cuba	6482 WYR	Matthias Prey; Germany	6282 PB	Cleiton Sabino; Brazil	6218 PB
WR world record | AR area record | CR championship record | GR games record | NR national record | OR Olympic record | PB personal best | SB season best | WL world leading (in a given season)

- Abdulagadir Idriss (Sudan) won the 400 metres hurdles final, but was later disqualified for doping.

=== Girls ===
Event	Gold		Silver		Bronze	
100 m	Bianca Knight; United States	11.38 WYL	Ebony Collins; United States	11.44 PB	Schillonie Calvert; Jamaica	11.44
200 m	Aymée Martínez; Cuba	22.99 CR	Bianca Knight; United States	23.33	LaToya King; Jamaica	23.57 PB
400 m	Nawal El Jack; Sudan	51.19 CR, NR	Danijela Grgic; Croatia	51.30 PB	Aymée Martínez; Cuba	52.04 PB
800 m	Teresa Flavious Kwamboka; Kenya	2:07.42	Winny Chebet; Kenya	2:08.15	Katherine Katsanevakis; Australia	2:08.35
1500 m	Sheila Kiprotich Chepkirui; Kenya	4:12.29 CR	Yuriko Kobayashi; Japan	4:13.96 PB	Bizunesh Mohammed Urgesa; Ethiopia	4:19.34 PB
3000 m	Veronica Wanjiru Nyaruai; Kenya	9:01.61 CR	Pauline Korikwiang Chemning; Kenya	9:05.42	Hitomi Niiya; Japan	9:10.34 PB
100 m H 76.2 cm	April Williams; United States	13.23 WYL	Natasha Ruddock; Jamaica	13.38	Theresa Lewis; United States	13.39
400 m H	Ebony Collins; United States	55.96 CR	Lauren Boden; Australia	58.30	Aya Miyahara; Japan	59.62
5000 m track walk	Tatyana Kalmykova; Russia	22:14.47 CR	Elmira Alembekova; Russia	22:27.17	Xue Chai; China	22:34.28 PB
Medley relay	United States; Khrystal Carter; Ebony Collins; Bianca Knight; Brandi Cross	2:03.93 WYL	Australia; Jessica Gulli; Olivia Tauro; Megan Hill; Jaimee-Lee Hoebergen	2:06.58 PB	Brazil; Tatiane Ferraz; Vanda Gomes; Franciela Krasucki; Josiane Valentim	2:06.60 PB
High jump	Gu Biwei; China	1.87	Sophia Begg; Australia	1.85	Yekaterina Yevseyeva; Kazakhstan	1.85
Pole vault	Ekaterini Stefanidi; Greece	4.30 CR	Keisa Monterola; Venezuela	4.30 CR	Shuo Yu; China	4.20 PB
Long jump	Arantxa King; Bermuda	6.39 PB	Eloyse Lesueur; France	6.28	Cornelia Deiac; Romania	6.25 PB
Triple jump	Li Sha; China	13.81	Kaire Leibak; Estonia	13.74 PB	Cristina Bujin; Romania	13.23
Shot put	Simone du Toit; South Africa	16.33 WYL	Bo Li; China	15.92 PB	Dani Samuels; Australia	15.53 PB
Discus	Dani Samuels; Australia	54.09	Simone du Toit; South Africa	52.10	Kamorean Hayes; United States	49.64 PB
Hammer	Bianca Perie; Romania	62.27	Anna Bulgakova; Russia	62.05	Dora Levai; Hungary	58.80 PB
Javelin	Zhang Li; China	56.66	Vira Rebryk; Ukraine	56.16	Yanet Cruz; Cuba	51.66
Heptathlon	Tatyana Chernova; Russia	5875 CR	Yana Panteleyeva; Russia	5611	Diana Rach; Germany	5481 PB
WR world record | AR area record | CR championship record | GR games record | NR national record | OR Olympic record | PB personal best | SB season best | WL world leading (in a given season)

== Medal table ==
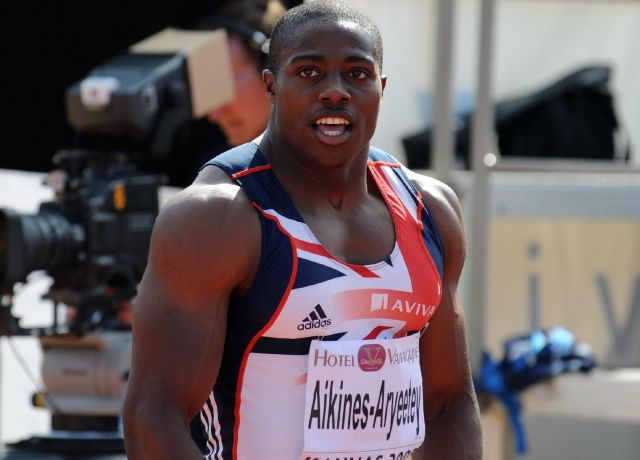
Harry Aikines-Aryeetey won a sprint double for Great Britain.

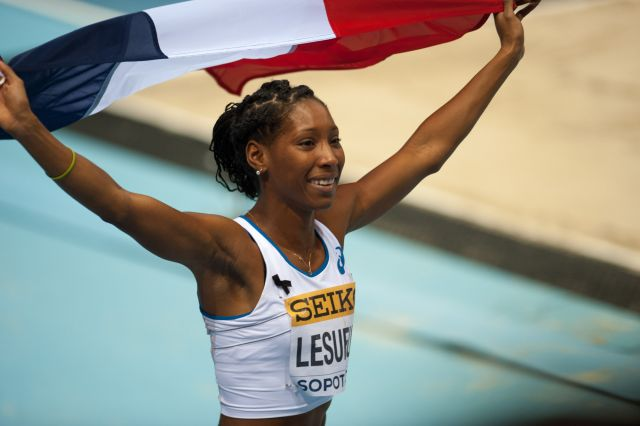
Éloyse Lesueur of France won her first major medal, a long jump silver, at these championships.

* Host nation (Morocco)

Rank	Nation	Gold	Silver	Bronze	Total
1	United States	6	3	4	13
2	Kenya	5	5	0	10
3	China	5	1	2	8
4	Russia	3	5	0	8
5	Cuba	3	2	2	7
6	South Africa	3	1	1	5
7	Sudan	3	0	1	4
8	Australia	2	3	2	7
9	Great Britain	2	1	2	5
10	Romania	1	1	2	4
11	Bahrain	1	1	1	3
11	Ethiopia	1	1	1	3
13	Hungary	1	0	1	2
14	Bermuda	1	0	0	1
14	Greece	1	0	0	1
14	Iran	1	0	0	1
17	Ukraine	0	4	0	4
18	Japan	0	1	3	4
19	Jamaica	0	1	2	3
20	Germany	0	1	1	2
20	Saudi Arabia	0	1	1	2
20	Trinidad and Tobago	0	1	1	2
23	Barbados	0	1	0	1
23	Croatia	0	1	0	1
23	Czech Republic	0	1	0	1
23	Estonia	0	1	0	1
23	France	0	1	0	1
23	Venezuela	0	1	0	1
29	Brazil	0	0	3	3
30	Bulgaria	0	0	2	2
30	Spain	0	0	2	2
32	Italy	0	0	1	1
32	Kazakhstan	0	0	1	1
32	Morocco*	0	0	1	1
32	Paraguay	0	0	1	1
32	Portugal	0	0	1	1
Totals (36 entries)		39	39	39	117

== See also ==
- 2005 in athletics (track and field)
