= 2007 European Athletics U23 Championships – Women's triple jump =

The women's triple jump event at the 2007 European Athletics U23 Championships was held in Debrecen, Hungary, at Gyulai István Atlétikai Stadion on 12 and 13 July.

== Medalists ==
Gold	Liliya Kulyk; Ukraine
Silver	Yekaterina Kayukova; Russia
Bronze	Anastasiya Taranova; Russia

== Results ==
=== Final ===
13 July

Rank	Name	Nationality	Attempts						Result	Notes
Rank	Name	Nationality	1	2	3	4	5	6	Result	Notes
1st place, gold medalist(s)	Liliya Kulyk	Ukraine	13.82 (w: 0.2 m/s)	x	x	13.16 (w: 0.8 m/s)	13.67 (w: 0.6 m/s)	14.39 (w: 0.4 m/s)	14.39 (w: 0.4 m/s)	
2nd place, silver medalist(s)	Yekaterina Kayukova	Russia	x	14.11 (w: 0.4 m/s)	13.70 (w: 1.1 m/s)	13.78 (w: 1.1 m/s)	13.84 (w: 0.6 m/s)	14.04 (w: 1.2 m/s)	14.11 (w: 0.4 m/s)	
3rd place, bronze medalist(s)	Anastasiya Taranova	Russia	13.74 (w: -0.1 m/s)	13.74 (w: -0.1 m/s)	13.99 w (w: 2.2 m/s)	13.89 (w: 0.9 m/s)	13.73 (w: 0.5 m/s)	13.96 (w: -0.4 m/s)	13.99 w (w: 2.2 m/s)	
4	Anna Kuropatkina	Russia	x	13.59 (w: 0.5 m/s)	13.64 (w: 1.2 m/s)	13.35 (w: 0.8 m/s)	13.35 (w: 0.8 m/s)	13.92 (w: 0.4 m/s)	13.92 (w: 0.4 m/s)	
5	Alina Elena Popescu	Romania	13.33 (w: 0.3 m/s)	13.68 (w: 1.7 m/s)	13.73 (w: 1.7 m/s)	13.57 (w: -0.3 m/s)	13.53 (w: 0.6 m/s)	13.47 (w: 0.5 m/s)	13.73 (w: 1.7 m/s)	
6	Niki Panetta	Greece	13.71 (w: 0.1 m/s)	x	13.67 (w: 1.9 m/s)	x	13.55 (w: 0.3 m/s)	13.47 (w: 0.0 m/s)	13.71 (w: 0.1 m/s)	
7	Kseniya Pryiemka	Belarus	x	x	13.47 (w: 0.5 m/s)	x	13.05 (w: 0.6 m/s)	13.04 (w: 0.0 m/s)	13.47 (w: 0.5 m/s)	
8	Aleksandra Zelenina	Moldova	12.85 (w: 1.1 m/s)	13.09 (w: 0.8 m/s)	13.36 (w: 1.6 m/s)	13.31 (w: 1.0 m/s)	13.46 (w: 1.0 m/s)	13.37 (w: 0.4 m/s)	13.46 (w: 1.0 m/s)	
9	Andriana Bânova	Bulgaria	x	12.98 (w: 0.1 m/s)	13.25 (w: 1.4 m/s)				13.25 (w: 1.4 m/s)	
10	Elina Sorsa	Finland	x	13.04 (w: -0.3 m/s)	x				13.04 (w: -0.3 m/s)	
11	Ruth Ndoumbe	Spain	x	12.86 (w: 0.9 m/s)	12.86 (w: 2.0 m/s)				12.86 (w: 0.9 m/s)	
	Nathalie Marie-Nelly	France	x	x	x				NM	

=== Qualifications ===
12 July
Qualifying 13.40 or 12 best to the Final

==== Group A ====
Rank	Name	Nationality	Result	Notes
1	Anna Kuropatkina	Russia	13.50 (w: 0.6 m/s)	Q
2	Anastasiya Taranova	Russia	13.49 (w: 1.2 m/s)	Q
3	Liliya Kulyk	Ukraine	13.42 (w: 0.8 m/s)	Q
4	Alina Elena Popescu	Romania	13.40 (w: 1.4 m/s)	Q
5	Elina Sorsa	Finland	13.22 (w: 0.8 m/s)	q
6	Ruth Ndoumbe	Spain	13.20 (w: 0.5 m/s)	q
7	Petia Dacheva	Bulgaria	13.01 (w: 0.4 m/s)	
8	Malika Soufi	France	12.67 (w: -0.3 m/s)	

==== Group B ====
Rank	Name	Nationality	Result	Notes
1	Niki Panetta	Greece	13.74 (w: 0.1 m/s)	Q
2	Yekaterina Kayukova	Russia	13.54 (w: 1.4 m/s)	Q
3	Nathalie Marie-Nelly	France	13.41 (w: 0.3 m/s)	Q
4	Aleksandra Zelenina	Moldova	13.26 (w: 0.0 m/s)	q
5	Kseniya Pryiemka	Belarus	13.24 (w: -0.4 m/s)	q
6	Andriana Bânova	Bulgaria	13.20 (w: 0.6 m/s)	q
7	Elena Denkova	Bulgaria	12.56 (w: 1.5 m/s)	
8	Sevim Sinmez	Turkey	12.14 (w: 0.0 m/s)	
	Karina Vnukova	Lithuania	NM	

== Participation ==
According to an unofficial count, 17 athletes from 12 countries participated in the event.

- Belarus (1)
- Bulgaria (3)
- Finland (1)
- France (2)
- Greece (1)
- Lithuania (1)
- Moldova (1)
- Romania (1)
- Russia (3)
- Spain (1)
- Turkey (1)
- Ukraine (1)
