= Vicenzino =

Vicenzino is a surname. Notable people with the surname include:

- Bill Vicenzino, Australian academic
- Tania Vicenzino (born 1986), Italian long jumper and bobsledder
