= Track and field at the 2011 Military World Games – Women's triple jump =

The women's triple jump event at the 2011 Military World Games was held on 21 July at the Estádio Olímpico João Havelange.

== Records ==
Prior to this competition, the existing world and CISM record were as follows:

World Record	Inessa Kravets (UKR)	15.50	Gothenburg, Sweden	10 August 1995
CISM World Record				

== Schedule ==
Date	Time	Round
21 July 2011	16:20	Final

== Medalists ==
Gold	Silver	Bronze
Simona La Mantia; Italy	Keila Costa; Brazil	Ruslana Tsykhotska; Ukraine

== Results ==
=== Final ===
Rank	Athlete	Nationality	#1	#2	#3	#4	#5	#6	Result	Notes
1st place, gold medalist(s)	Simona La Mantia	Italy	14.17 (+0.8 m/s)	14.19 (+0.2 m/s)	14.14 (0.0 m/s)	x	x	x	14.19 (+0.2 m/s)	
2nd place, silver medalist(s)	Keila Costa	Brazil	14.06 (+0.2 m/s)	13.77 (-0.2 m/s)	14.11 (0.0 m/s)	x	–	14.04 (+0.3 m/s)	14.11 (0.0 m/s)	
3rd place, bronze medalist(s)	Ruslana Tsykhotska	Ukraine	13.66 (+0.2 m/s)	13.36 (-0.2 m/s)	13.76 (+0.1 m/s)	13.94 (0.0 m/s)	x	14.05 (+0.3 m/s)	14.05 (+0.3 m/s)	
4	Natallia Viatkina	Belarus	13.70 (0.0 m/s)	x	13.73 (0.0 m/s)	x	x	x	13.73 (0.0 m/s)	
5	Jamaa Chnaik	Morocco	x	12.89 (0.0 m/s)	13.01 (+0.1 m/s)	13.22 (+0.2 m/s)	13.28 (0.0 m/s)	12.97 (+0.1 m/s)	13.28 (0.0 m/s)	
6	Kseniya Dziatsuk	Belarus	x	x	12.91 (+0.2 m/s)	–	–	–	12.91 (+0.2 m/s)	
7	Vanessa Seles	Brazil	x	12.81 (-0.1 m/s)	12.85 (+0.4 m/s)	x	12.73 (+0.2 m/s)	x	12.85 (+0.4 m/s)	
8	Anne Neubauer	Germany	12.67 (0.0 m/s)	x	12.48 (0.0 m/s)	12.65 (0.0 m/s)	x	12.70 (0.0 m/s)	12.70 (0.0 m/s)	
9	Munich Tovar	Venezuela	12.60 (+0.9 m/s)	x	x				12.60 (+0.9 m/s)	
10	Joelle Sandrine Mbumi Nkouindjin	Cameroon	12.31 (+0.8 m/s)	12.55 (0.0 m/s)	12.44 (+0.1 m/s)				12.55 (0.0 m/s)	
11	C. Priyadarshani	Sri Lanka	12.15 (+0.2 m/s)	12.45 (+0.2 m/s)	12.12 (+0.1 m/s)				12.45 (+0.2 m/s)	
12	Valerie Jintoena	Suriname	x	12.02 (0.0 m/s)	12.20 (+0.3 m/s)				12.20 (+0.3 m/s)	
	Svitlana Mamyeyeva	Ukraine	x	x	x				NM	
