= 2012 IAAF World Indoor Championships – Women's triple jump =

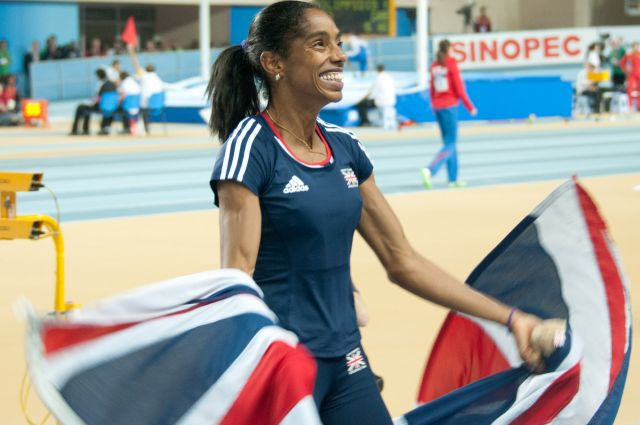
Gold medal winner Yamilé Aldama celebrating her win.

The women's triple jump at the 2012 IAAF World Indoor Championships took place March 9 and 10 at the Ataköy Athletics Arena.

Ageless wonder 39-year-old Yamilé Aldama improved upon her already pending W35 World Record in qualifying. In the second attempt of the finals, she exceeded the existing record by 31 cm, which also proved to good enough for the win. While this competition is indoors, since 2000 IAAF rules allow for indoor records to count for overall (outdoor) records.

== Medalists ==
Gold	Silver	Bronze
Yamilé Aldama; Great Britain	Olga Rypakova; Kazakhstan	Mabel Gay; Cuba

== Records ==
Standing records prior to the 2012 IAAF World Indoor Championships
World record	Tatyana Lebedeva (RUS)	15.36	Budapest, Hungary	6 March 2004
Championship record	Tatyana Lebedeva (RUS)	15.36	Budapest, Hungary	6 March 2004
World Leading	Olga Rypakova (KAZ)	14.84	Karaganda, Kazakhstan	27 January 2012
African record	Yamilé Aldama (SUD)	14.90	Budapest, Hungary	6 March 2004
Asian record	Olga Rypakova (KAZ)	15.14	Doha, Qatar	13 March 2010
European record	Tatyana Lebedeva (RUS)	15.36	Budapest, Hungary	6 March 2004
North and Central American and Caribbean record	Yargelis Savigne (CUB)	15.05	Valencia, Spain	8 March 2008
Oceanian record	Nicole Mladenis (AUS)	13.31	Budapest, Hungary	5 March 2004
South American record	Keila Costa (BRA)	14.11	Moscow, Russia	10 March 2006

== Qualification standards ==
Indoor
14.10

== Schedule ==
Date	Time	Round
March 9, 2012	9:30	Qualification
March 10, 2012	17:05	Final

== Results ==
=== Qualification ===
Qualification standard 14.30 m (Q) or at least best 8 qualified. 30 athletes from 20 countries participated. The qualification round started at 09:32 and ended at 10:20.

Rank	Group	Athlete	Nationality	#1	#2	#3	Result	Notes
1	A	Yamilé Aldama	Great Britain	14.62			14.62	Q, SB
2	A	Olga Rypakova	Kazakhstan	14.39			14.39	Q
3	B	Anna Krylova	Russia	14.01	14.27	x	14.27	q
4	B	Li Yanmei	China	14.23	x	—	14.23	q, SB
5	A	Mabel Gay	Cuba	x	x	14.22	q	
6	A	Dana Velďáková	Slovakia	x	14.21	x	14.21	q, SB
7	B	Kimberly Williams	Jamaica	14.09	14.15	13.88	14.15	q
8	B	Yargelis Savigne	Cuba	13.84	14.00	14.09	14.09	q
9	A	Marija Šestak	Slovenia	x	14.05	14.04	14.05	
10	A	Viktoriya Valyukevich	Russia	13.71	13.49	14.00	14.00	
11	A	Níki Panéta	Greece	13.45	13.98	13.81	13.98	
12	B	Mayookha Johny	India	13.74	13.95	x	13.95	NR
13	A	Aleksandra Kotlyarova	Uzbekistan	13.67	13.66	13.95	13.95	
14	A	Baya Rahouli	Algeria	13.83	x	x	13.83	
15	A	Cristina Bujin	Romania	13.75	x	13.80	13.80	
16	B	Irina Litvinenko Ektova	Kazakhstan	13.26	13.62	13.70	13.70	
17	B	Kristin Gierisch	Germany	13.67	13.67	—	13.67	
18	B	Kseniya Dziatsuk	Belarus	13.49	x	13.66	13.66	
19	B	Adelina Gavrilă	Romania	x	13.63	13.65	13.65	
20	A	Petia Dacheva	Bulgaria	13.65	13.60	x	13.65	SB
21	B	Hanna Knyazeva	Ukraine	13.65	13.51	13.28	13.65	
22	B	Gisele de Oliveira	Brazil	x	13.60	13.49	13.60	
23	A	Xie Limei	China	13.54	x	11.99	13.54	
24	B	Valeriya Kanatova	Uzbekistan	13.51	13.48	13.48	13.51	
25	B	Andriana Bânova	Bulgaria	13.50	13.50	12.86	13.50	
26	A	Amanda Smock	United States	x	12.99	13.25	13.25	
27	A	Ruslana Tsykhotska	Ukraine	13.21	x	x	13.21	
28	B	Sevim Sinmez	Turkey	x	13.13	12.64	13.13	
	A	Patricia Sarrapio	Spain	x	x	x	NM	
	B	Snežana Rodič	Slovenia	x	x	x	NM	

=== Final ===
8 athletes from 7 countries participated. The final started at 17:06 and ended at 18:10.

Rank	Athlete	Nationality	#1	#2	#3	#4	#5	#6	Result	Notes
1st place, gold medalist(s)	Yamilé Aldama	Great Britain	14.10	14.82	x	—	—	—	14.82	SB
2nd place, silver medalist(s)	Olga Rypakova	Kazakhstan	x	x	x	14.45	14.63	x	14.63	
3rd place, bronze medalist(s)	Mabel Gay	Cuba	14.08	14.05	14.19	x	14.29	14.13	14.29	
4	Yargelis Savigne	Cuba	14.28	14.18	14.12	13.68	14.11	13.90	14.28	
5	Kimberly Williams	Jamaica	14.05	13.41	14.22	13.72	13.76	14.27	14.27	
6	Anna Krylova	Russia	13.92	14.21	x	14.04	x	14.06	14.21	
7	Li Yanmei	China	13.82	x	x	x	14.02	x	14.02	
8	Dana Velďáková	Slovakia	x	x	13.97	x	x	x	13.97	
