= 2009 European Athletics U23 Championships – Women's triple jump =

The women's triple jump event at the 2009 European Athletics U23 Championships was held in Kaunas, Lithuania, at S. Dariaus ir S. Girėno stadionas (Darius and Girėnas Stadium) on 16 and 17 July.

== Medalists ==
Gold	Paraskevi Papahristou; Greece
Silver	Cristina Bujin; Romania
Bronze	Liliya Kulyk; Ukraine

== Results ==
=== Final ===
17 July

Rank	Name	Nationality	Attempts						Result	Notes
Rank	Name	Nationality	1	2	3	4	5	6	Result	Notes
1st place, gold medalist(s)	Paraskevi Papahristou	Greece	14.34 (w: 0.3 m/s)	13.82 (w: -1.4 m/s)	14.02 (w: -1.8 m/s)	13.94 (w: -1.2 m/s)	x	12.37 (w: -0.3 m/s)	14.34 (w: 0.3 m/s)	
2nd place, silver medalist(s)	Cristina Bujin	Romania	13.89 (w: -0.1 m/s)	14.13 (w: -0.6 m/s)	11.94 (w: -0.8 m/s)	13.99 (w: -0.9 m/s)	x	14.26 (w: -0.5 m/s)	14.26 (w: -0.5 m/s)	
3rd place, bronze medalist(s)	Liliya Kulyk	Ukraine	x	13.88 (w: -0.5 m/s)	13.50 (w: -0.3 m/s)	13.53 (w: -0.2 m/s)	x	13.85 (w: -0.9 m/s)	13.88 (w: -0.5 m/s)	
4	Kaire Leibak	Estonia	13.53 (w: -0.1 m/s)	13.72 (w: 0.2 m/s)	13.38 (w: -1.3 m/s)	13.63 (w: -0.7 m/s)	13.72 (w: -0.3 m/s)	x	13.72 (w: 0.2 m/s)	
5	Patrícia Mamona	Portugal	13.39 (w: -0.1 m/s)	x	13.47 (w: 0.0 m/s)	13.14 (w: -0.6 m/s)	x	13.71 (w: 0.0 m/s)	13.71 (w: 0.0 m/s)	
6	Alsu Murtazina	Russia	13.70 (w: 0.8 m/s)	13.40 (w: -1.0 m/s)	13.52 (w: 0.3 m/s)	13.65 (w: -0.1 m/s)	13.44 (w: -1.3 m/s)	x	13.70 (w: 0.8 m/s)	
7	Natallia Viatkina	Belarus	x	13.59 (w: -0.2 m/s)	12.75 (w: 0.0 m/s)	13.40 (w: -0.5 m/s)	13.70 (w: -0.7 m/s)	13.40 (w: -0.4 m/s)	13.70 (w: -0.7 m/s)	
8	Haoua Kessely	France	x	13.69 (w: -1.0 m/s)	11.97 (w: -1.2 m/s)	–	13.26 (w: -1.1 m/s)	13.36 (w: -0.6 m/s)	13.69 (w: -1.0 m/s)	
9	Andriana Bânova	Bulgaria	13.18 (w: 0.3 m/s)	x	13.20 (w: 1.4 m/s)				13.20 (w: 1.4 m/s)	
10	Ruth Ndoumbe	Spain	12.92 (w: -1.0 m/s)	12.94 (w: -0.3 m/s)	13.19 (w: -1.0 m/s)				13.19 (w: -1.0 m/s)	
11	Jolanta Verseckaitė	Lithuania	x	13.06 (w: -0.1 m/s)	13.03 (w: -1.4 m/s)				13.06 (w: -0.1 m/s)	
12	Ekaterina Menne	Germany	x	12.81 (w: -0.5 m/s)	12.83 (w: -1.3 m/s)				12.83 (w: -1.3 m/s)	

=== Qualifications ===
16 July
Qualifying 13.65 or 12 best to the Final

==== Group A ====
Rank	Name	Nationality	Result	Notes
1	Natallia Viatkina	Belarus	13.61 (w: 0.5 m/s)	q
2	Liliya Kulyk	Ukraine	13.59 (w: 0.3 m/s)	q
3	Ekaterina Menne	Germany	13.48 (w: 1.0 m/s)	q
4	Ruth Ndoumbe	Spain	13.43 (w: 0.7 m/s)	q
5	Andriana Bânova	Bulgaria	13.33 (w: 0.4 m/s)	q
6	Haoua Kessely	France	13.33 (w: 0.2 m/s)	q
7	Francesca Cortelazzo	Italy	12.79 (w: -0.3 m/s)	
8	Haykanush Beklaryan	Armenia	12.74 (w: 0.5 m/s)	
9	Asta Daukšaitė	Lithuania	12.67 (w: 0.2 m/s)	
	Carmen Toma	Romania	NM	

==== Group B ====
Rank	Name	Nationality	Result	Notes
1	Cristina Bujin	Romania	14.13 (w: 1.1 m/s)	Q
2	Paraskevi Papahristou	Greece	13.81 (w: -0.3 m/s)	Q
3	Kaire Leibak	Estonia	13.65 (w: -0.3 m/s)	Q
4	Patrícia Mamona	Portugal	13.51 (w: 0.8 m/s)	q
5	Alsu Murtazina	Russia	13.39 (w: 0.0 m/s)	q
6	Jolanta Verseckaitė	Lithuania	13.36 (w: 0.5 m/s)	q
7	Federica De Santis	Italy	13.17 (w: 0.5 m/s)	
8	Antoaneta Petkova	Bulgaria	13.09 (w: 0.2 m/s)	
9	Eleonora D'Elicio	Italy	13.08 (w: 0.2 m/s)	
10	Inger Anne Frøysedal	Norway	13.06 (w: 0.2 m/s)	

== Participation ==
According to an unofficial count, 20 athletes from 15 countries participated in the event.

- Armenia (1)
- Belarus (1)
- Bulgaria (2)
- Estonia (1)
- France (1)
- Germany (1)
- Greece (1)
- Italy (3)
- Lithuania (2)
- Norway (1)
- Portugal (1)
- Romania (2)
- Russia (1)
- Spain (1)
- Ukraine (1)
