= Irina Gumenyuk =

Russian triple jumper (born 1988)

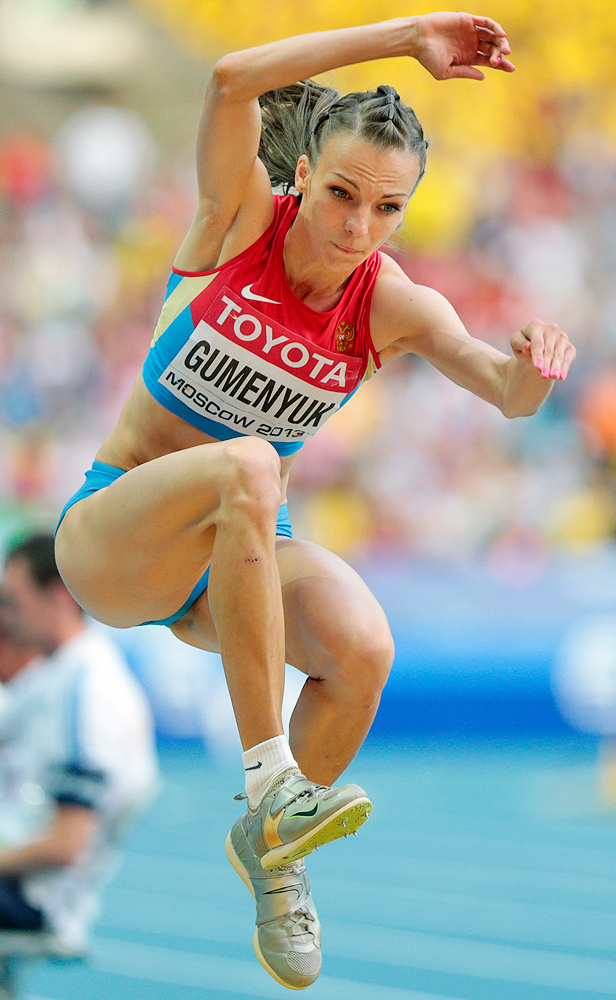
- Irina Gumenyuk at 2013 World Championships in Athletics

Personal information
- Born: 6 January 1988 (age 38) Leningrad, Russian SFSR, Soviet Union

Sport
- Country: Russia
- Sport: Women's athletics
Medal record
European Championships
Bronze medal – third place	2014 Zürich	Triple jump
European Indoor Championships
Silver medal – second place	2013 Gothenburg	Triple jump

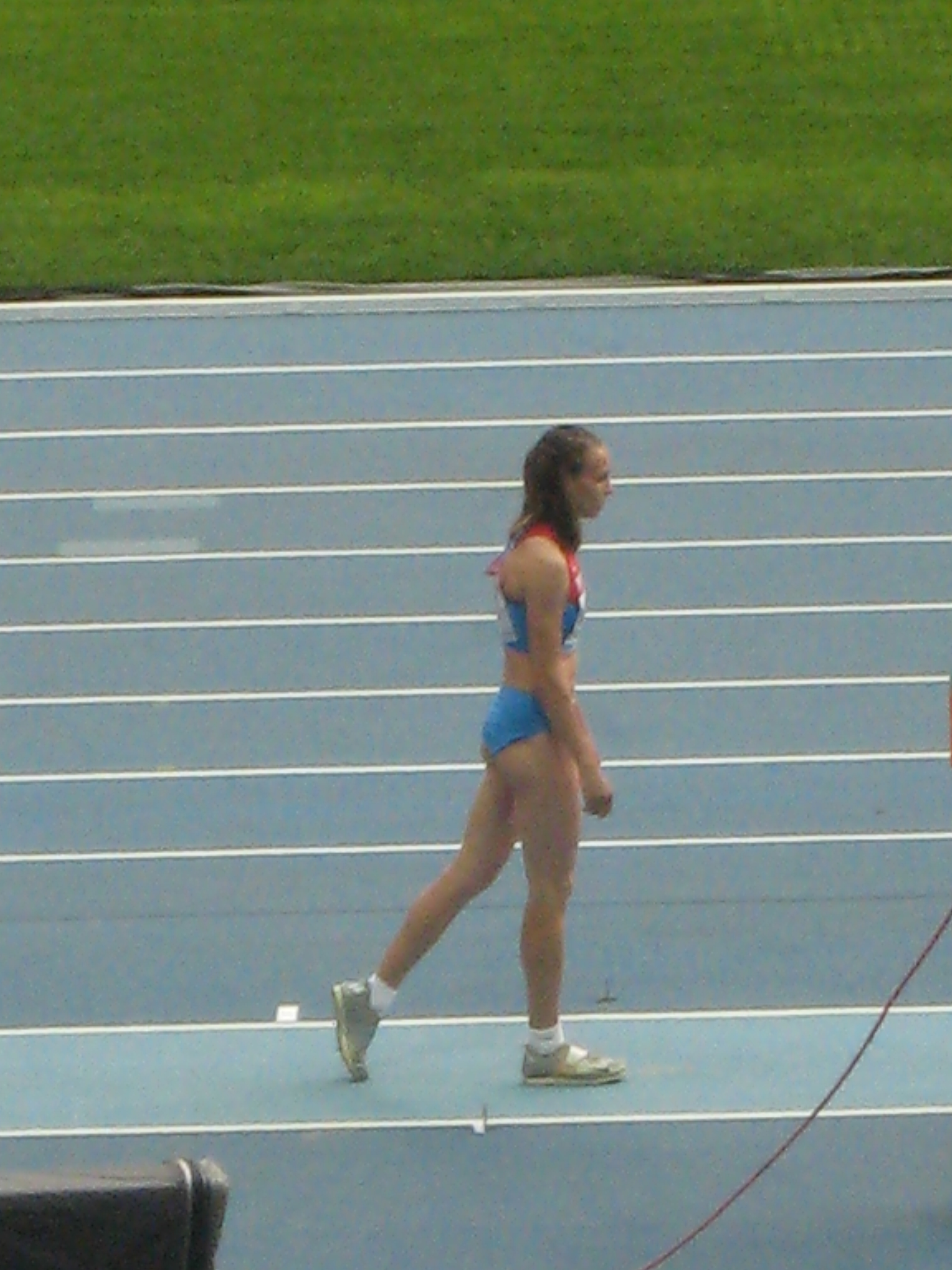
Irina Gumenyuk in Moscow 2013.

Irina Borisovna Gumenyuk (Russian: Ирина Борисовна Гуменюк; born 6 January 1988) is a Russian track and field athlete who competes in the triple jump. She was the silver medallist in the event at the 2013 European Athletics Indoor Championships. Her triple jump personal best is 14.48 metres, set in 2013.

Gumenyuk started out in the long jump. In 2005, she cleared six metres for the first time and placed fifth at the European Youth Olympic Festival. The teenage athlete began to focus on the triple jump in her competitions the following year. In 2007, she had a personal best of 13.55 metres in the event, won the Russian junior title and placed in the top ten at the 2007 European Athletics Junior Championships.

She triple jumped 13.65 m in 2008, but did not improve upon this performance for three years. The 2011 season saw her set a long jump best of 6.38 m and clear fourteen metres in the triple jump both indoors and out. Her first success as a senior came that year as she was runner-up at the European Champion Clubs Cup, taking second behind Patricia Sarrapio. She had a strong start to the 2013 indoor season with multiple clearances over fourteen metres, including a best of 14.48 m in Saint Petersburg. She then beat Viktoriya Dolgacheva to take the Russian indoor title with a clearance of 14.41 m.

In her first senior international competition for Russia she won the triple jump silver medal at the 2013 European Athletics Indoor Championships, her mark of 14.30 m only beaten by Olha Saladuha (the reigning world and European champion).

== International competitions ==
Representing Russia
Year	Competition	Venue	Position	Event	Result	Notes
2007	European Junior Championships	Hengelo, Netherlands	9th	Triple jump	12.86 m	
2013	European Indoor Championships	Gothenburg, Sweden	2nd	Triple jump	14.30 m	
2013	World Championships	Moscow, Russia	8th	Triple jump	14.15 m	
2014	European Championships	Zürich, Switzerland	3rd	Triple jump	14.46 m	

== National titles ==
- Russian Athletics Championships
  - Triple jump: 2013

== See also ==
- List of European Athletics Championships medalists (women)
- List of European Athletics Indoor Championships medalists (women)
