= 2011 World Youth Championships in Athletics – Boys' hammer throw =

Boys' hammer throw at the 2011 World Youth Championships in Athletics
- Venue: Stadium Lille Métropole
- Dates: 7 July (qualification); 8 July (final)
- Competitors: 41
- Winning distance: 82.60 CR

Medalists
gold medal	Bence Pásztor	Hungary
silver medal	Özkan Baltacı	Turkey
bronze medal	Serhiy Reheda	Ukraine

The boys' hammer throw at the 2011 World Youth Championships in Athletics was held at the Stadium Lille Métropole on 7 and 8 July.

== Medalists ==
Gold	Silver	Bronze
Bence Pásztor; Hungary	Özkan Baltacı; Turkey	Serhiy Reheda; Ukraine

== Records ==
Prior to the competition, the following records were as follows.

World Youth Best	Bence Pásztor (HUN)	83.92	Veszprém, Hungary	11 June 2011
Championship Record	Sandor Palhegyi (HUN)	81.89	Marrakesh, Morocco	15 July 2005
World Youth Leading	Bence Pásztor (HUN)	83.92	Veszprém, Hungary	11 June 2011

== Qualification ==
Qualification rule: qualification standard 70.00 m or at least best 12 qualified.

=== Group A ===
Rank	Name	Nationality	#1	#2	#3	Result	Notes
1	Özkan Baltacı	Turkey	x	76.32		76.32	Q
2	Marco Bortolato	Italy	71.49			71.49	Q
3	Diego del Real	Mexico	x	69.70	70.29	70.29	Q
4	Serhiy Reheda	Ukraine	70.10			70.10	Q
5	Mihail Anastasakis	Greece	66.57	70.02		70.02	Q
6	Viktor Postniy	Russia	66.87	68.72	66.51	68.72	q
7	Sebastian Nowicki	Poland	67.67	67.27	x	67.67	
8	Andrei Maslau	Belarus	66.44	67.63	x	67.63	
9	Risto Kauppinen	Finland	67.28	66.49	67.43	67.43	
10	Peter Millman	Canada	60.92	66.93	x	66.93	PB
11	Hevertt Álvarez	Chile	66.45	x	66.17	66.45	
12	Zhang Shiwei	China	7.08	65.09	63.18	65.09	
13	Bálint Horváth	Hungary	62.56	x	63.58	63.58	
14	Hisham El-Sayed	Hungary	x	x	63.19	63.19	
15	Pablo Estévez	Argentina	62.25	62.78	61.62	62.78	PB
16	Abdulrahman Al-Rashoud	Kuwait	59.28	x	x	59.28	
17	Vladimir Torlopov	Kazakhstan	56.37	58.39	x	58.39	
	Pablo González	Spain	x	x	x	NM	
	Basile Rolnin	France	x	x	x	NM	
	Stevan Veselinović	Serbia	x	x	x	NM	

=== Group B ===
Rank	Name	Nationality	#1	#2	#3	Result	Notes
1	Bence Pásztor	Hungary	x	79.36		79.36	Q
2	Eslam Ahmed Ibrahim	Egypt	72.76			72.76	Q, SB
3	Tolgahan Yavuz	Turkey	71.21			71.21	Q, PB
4	Anders Eriksson	Sweden	70.32			70.32	Q, PB
5	Rudy Winkler	United States	69.09	67.00	68.59	69.09	q
6	Athanasios Manolopoulos	Greece	64.66	68.68	x	68.68	q
7	Yury Vasilchanka	Belarus	66.41	67.95	68.39	68.39	
8	Callum Brown	Great Britain	67.01	x	67.90	67.90	
9	Valeriy Pronkin	Russia	65.85	66.06	x	66.06	
10	Simon Lang	Germany	64.30	65.37	4.41	65.37	
11	Francesco Neri	Italy	64.52	x	63.86	64.52	
12	Abdul Rahman Ali	Kuwait	59.58	64.03	x	64.03	
13	Damien Bruxelle	France	x	62.68	x	62.68	
14	Aitor Llevot	Spain	x	61.60	x	61.60	
15	Timur Beshirov	Kazakhstan	61.49	x	x	61.49	
16	Abraham Parra	Mexico	x	60.89	x	60.89	
17	Marco Morales	Chile	59.36	x	60.51	60.51	
18	Ahamad Ali	India	x	x	57.71	57.71	
19	Charles Nguyen	Canada	x	x	55.88	55.88	
	Stylianos Kazakeos	Cyprus	x	x	x	NM	
	Waltteri Lahtinen	Finland	x	x	x	NM	

== Final ==
Rank	Name	Nationality	#1	#2	#3	#4	#5	#6	Result	Notes
1st place, gold medalist(s)	Bence Pásztor	Hungary	82.13	82.47	82.01	x	x	82.60	82.60	CR
2nd place, silver medalist(s)	Özkan Baltacı	Turkey	75.02	x	77.53	x	74.70	78.63	78.63	PB
3rd place, bronze medalist(s)	Serhiy Reheda	Ukraine	74.06	73.73	x	x	x	x	74.06	
4	Eslam Ahmed Ibrahim	Egypt	72.35	70.23	70.96	70.70	x	x	72.35	
5	Tolgahan Yavuz	Turkey	71.04	70.19	69.14	72.23	70.66	67.76	72.23	PB
6	Diego del Real	Mexico	71.50	x	72.21	x	x	68.89	72.21	PB
7	Marco Bortolato	Italy	x	x	70.50	70.31	x	68.78	70.50	
8	Mihail Anastasakis	Greece	x	63.42	69.64	x	65.60	63.81	69.64	
9	Rudy Winkler	United States	x	x	68.14				68.14	
10	Anders Eriksson	Sweden	61.65	68.01	67.20				68.01	
11	Viktor Postniy	Russia	66.20	67.08	66.92				67.08	
12	Athanasios Manolopoulos	Greece	x	67.08	x				67.08	
