= Track and field at the 2011 Military World Games – Women's long jump =

The women's long jump event at the 2011 Military World Games was held on 23 July at the Estádio Olímpico João Havelange.

== Records ==
Prior to this competition, the existing world and CISM record were as follows:

| World Record | Galina Chistyakova (URS) | 7.52 | Leningrad, Soviet Union | 11 June 1988 |
| CISM World Record | Olga Rublyova (RUS) | 6.71 | Rome, Italy | September 1995 |

== Schedule ==
| Date | Time | Round |
|---|---|---|
| 23 July 2011 | 10:10 | Final |

== Medalists ==
| Gold | Silver | Bronze |
|---|---|---|
| Keila Costa; Brazil | Vanessa Seles; Brazil | Ruslana Tsykhotska; Ukraine |

== Results ==
=== Final ===
| Rank | Athlete | Nationality | #1 | #2 | #3 | #4 | #5 | #6 | Mark | Notes |
|---|---|---|---|---|---|---|---|---|---|---|
| 1st place, gold medalist(s) | Keila Costa | Brazil | x | 6.28 (+0.5 m/s) | 6.41 (+0.1 m/s) | 6.37 (-0.1 m/s) | 6.13 (-0.1 m/s) | – | 6.41 (+0.1 m/s) | |
| 2nd place, silver medalist(s) | Vanessa Seles | Brazil | 6.07 (-0.6 m/s) | x | 5.87 (-1.2 m/s) | x | 5.95 (-0.5 m/s) | 6.28 (-0.4 m/s) | 6.28 (-0.4 m/s) | |
| 3rd place, bronze medalist(s) | Ruslana Tsykhotska | Ukraine | 6.21 (-2.0 m/s) | 6.21 (+0.2 m/s) | 6.23 (-0.4 m/s) | x | 6.20 (-0.3 m/s) | x | 6.23 (-0.4 m/s) | |
| 4 | Viktoria Molchanova | Ukraine | x | 6.06 (-0.3 m/s) | 5.79 (-1.1 m/s) | 6.09 (-0.1 m/s) | 6.15 (-0.8 m/s) | 6.19 (0.0 m/s) | 6.19 (0.0 m/s) | |
| 5 | Anika Leipold | Germany | x | 6.08 (-0.6 m/s) | 6.13 (-0.3 m/s) | x | x | x | 6.13 (-0.3 m/s) | |
| 6 | Jamaa Chnaik | Morocco | 5.98 (-1.1 m/s) | x | 5.90 (-0.7 m/s) | 5.90 (-0.1 m/s) | 6.09 (-0.9 m/s) | 6.05 (+0.3 m/s) | 6.09 (-0.9 m/s) | |
| 7 | Munich Tovar | Venezuela | x | 6.01 (+0.6 m/s) | x | 5.84 (-0.3 m/s) | 5.82 (-0.5 m/s) | x | 6.01 (+0.6 m/s) | |
| 8 | C. Priyadarshani | Sri Lanka | 5.64 (-1.4 m/s) | 5.82 (-0.5 m/s) | 5.86 (-0.4 m/s) | x | 5.74 (-0.3 m/s) | – | 5.86 (-0.4 m/s) | |
| 9 | Joelle Sandrine Mbumi Nkouindjin | Cameroon | 5.77 (-1.0 m/s) | x | 5.86 (-0.1 m/s) | | | | 5.86 (-0.1 m/s) | |
| 10 | Valerie Jintoena | Suriname | 5.32 (-0.4 m/s) | 4.85 (0.0 m/s) | 5.36 (-0.7 m/s) | | | | 5.36 (-0.7 m/s) | |
| 11 | Kasandra Clark | United States | 4.90 (-1.1 m/s) | 4.79 (+0.1 m/s) | x | | | | 4.90 (-1.1 m/s) | |
