= 2013 European Athletics Indoor Championships – Women's triple jump =

The Women's triple jump event at the 2013 European Athletics Indoor Championships was held on March 1, 2013, at 18:40 (qualification) and March 3, 11:05 (final) local time.

== Records ==
Standing records prior to the 2013 European Athletics Indoor Championships
World record	Tatyana Lebedeva (RUS)	15.36	Budapest, Hungary	6 March 2004
European record	Tatyana Lebedeva (RUS)	15.36	Budapest, Hungary	6 March 2004
Championship record	Ashia Hansen (GBR)	15.16	Valencia, Spain	28 February 1998
World Leading	Olha Saladuha (UKR)	14.61	Birmingham, Great Britain	16 February 2013
European Leading	Olha Saladuha (UKR)	14.61	Birmingham, Great Britain	16 February 2013

== Results ==
=== Qualification ===
Qualification: Qualification Performance 14.10 (Q) or at least 8 best performers advanced to the final.

Rank	Athlete	Nationality	#1	#2	#3	Result	Notes
1	Olha Saladuha	Ukraine	14.47			14.47	Q
2	Irina Gumenyuk	Russia	14.30			14.30	Q
3	Simona La Mantia	Italy	14.24			14.24	Q
4	Veronika Mosina	Russia	13.78	14.17		14.17	Q
5	Patrícia Mamona	Portugal	13.90	x	13.99	13.90	q
6	Yamilé Aldama	Great Britain	13.92	x	x	13.92	q
7	Jenny Elbe	Germany	13.43	13.88	13.45	13.88	q
8	Patricia Sarrapio	Spain	x	13.62	13.85	13.85	q
9	Viktoriya Dolgacheva	Russia	13.83	x	x	13.83	
10	Dana Velďáková	Slovakia	x	13.82	13.76	13.82	
11	Gita Dodova	Bulgaria	13.62	13.75	13.50	13.75	
12	Susana Costa	Portugal	13.65	13.74	x	13.74	
13	Níki Panéta	Greece	x	13.36	13.55	13.55	
14	Dovilė Dzindzaletaitė	Lithuania	x	13.22	13.53	13.53	
15	Cristina Bujin	Romania	13.47	x	13.40	13.47	
16	Kseniya Dziatsuk	Belarus	x	13.46	x	13.46	
17	Santa Matule	Latvia	x	13.33	13.15	13.33	
18	Ruslana Tsyhotska	Ukraine	13.10	x	12.76	13.10	
19	Maja Bratkič	Slovenia	11.49	12.99	12.99	12.99	
	Nina Serbezova	Cyprus	x	–	–	NM	
	Sevim Sinmez Serbest	Turkey	x	x	x	NM	

=== Final ===
The final was held at 11:05.

Rank	Athlete	Nationality	#1	#2	#3	#4	#5	#6	Result	Notes
1st place, gold medalist(s)	Olha Saladuha	Ukraine	14.88	x	x	14.68	x	x	14.88	WL, NR
2nd place, silver medalist(s)	Irina Gumenyuk	Russia	14.25	x	x	14.30	13.74	14.05	14.30	
3rd place, bronze medalist(s)	Simona La Mantia	Italy	14.24	14.04	14.26	x	x	14.04	14.26	SB
4	Veronika Mosina	Russia	14.21	14.08	13.35	13.80	14.01	14.09	14.21	
5	Patricia Sarrapio	Spain	x	x	14.07	x	x	13.45	14.07	PB
6	Yamilé Aldama	Great Britain	x	13.91	13.95	x	x	13.95	13.95	SB
7	Jenny Elbe	Germany	13.64	x	13.66	13.47	13.81	13.54	13.81	
8	Patrícia Mamona	Portugal	13.72	x	x	13.51	13.59	13.57	13.72	
