= Cordera =

Cordera is both a given name and a surname. Notable people with the name include:

- Cordera Eason (born 1987), American football player, trainer, and coach
- Cordera Jenkins (born 1988), American hurdler
- Gustavo Cordera (born 1961), Argentine musician
