= 2007 European Athletics U23 Championships – Women's long jump =

The women's long jump event at the 2007 European Athletics U23 Championships was held in Debrecen, Hungary, at Gyulai István Atlétikai Stadion on 14 and 15 July.

== Medalists ==
| Gold | Anna Nazarova; Russia |
| Silver | Denisa Ščerbová; Czech Republic |
| Bronze | Yelena Sokolova; Russia |

== Results ==
=== Final ===
15 July

| Rank | Name | Nationality | Attempts | | | | | | Result | Notes |
| Rank | Name | Nationality | 1 | 2 | 3 | 4 | 5 | 6 | Result | Notes |
|---|---|---|---|---|---|---|---|---|---|---|
| 1st place, gold medalist(s) | Anna Nazarova | Russia | 6.61 (w: -1.0 m/s) | x | 6.81 (w: 0.0 m/s) | 6.78 (w: 1.5 m/s) | x | x | 6.81 (w: 0.0 m/s) | |
| 2nd place, silver medalist(s) | Denisa Ščerbová | Czech Republic | 6.51 (w: -0.1 m/s) | 6.52 (w: 0.8 m/s) | 6.80 w (w: 2.1 m/s) | 6.41 (w: -0.7 m/s) | 6.59 (w: 0.0 m/s) | 6.53 (w: 0.0 m/s) | 6.80 w (w: 2.1 m/s) | |
| 3rd place, bronze medalist(s) | Yelena Sokolova | Russia | x | 4.53 (w: 1.2 m/s) | 6.58 (w: 1.6 m/s) | 6.57 (w: 0.1 m/s) | x | 6.71 (w: 0.0 m/s) | 6.71 (w: 0.0 m/s) | |
| 4 | Joanna Skibińska | Poland | 5.73 (w: 0.0 m/s) | 6.37 (w: 1.6 m/s) | 6.52 (w: 1.3 m/s) | x | x | 6.38 (w: -0.6 m/s) | 6.52 (w: 1.3 m/s) | |
| 5 | Tania Vicenzino | Italy | 6.50 (w: 0.1 m/s) | 6.46 w (w: 2.1 m/s) | x | 6.33 w (w: 2.1 m/s) | 6.38 (w: 0.6 m/s) | 6.28 (w: -0.1 m/s) | 6.50 (w: 0.1 m/s) | |
| 6 | Veranika Shutkova | Belarus | 6.16 (w: -1.1 m/s) | x | 6.49 (w: 0.4 m/s) | x | 6.40 (w: 0.2 m/s) | x | 6.49 (w: 0.4 m/s) | |
| 7 | Natacha Vouaux | France | 5.89 (w: 0.5 m/s) | 6.45 (w: -0.1 m/s) | 5.99 (w: 0.2 m/s) | 6.08 (w: 0.9 m/s) | x | x | 6.45 (w: -0.1 m/s) | |
| 8 | Nina Kolarič | Slovenia | x | 6.37 (w: 1.4 m/s) | 6.27 (w: 0.9 m/s) | 2.61 (w: 0.2 m/s) | 6.35 (w: 0.1 m/s) | 6.34 (w: 0.8 m/s) | 6.37 (w: 1.4 m/s) | |
| 9 | Euzhan Varlin | France | 6.03 (w: 0.0 m/s) | 6.02 (w: 1.0 m/s) | 6.29 (w: 0.4 m/s) | | | | 6.29 (w: 0.4 m/s) | |
| 10 | Amy Harris | United Kingdom | 6.27 (w: 0.6 m/s) | 6.19 (w: 0.8 m/s) | 6.22 (w: 0.4 m/s) | | | | 6.27 (w: 0.6 m/s) | |
| 11 | Margrethe Renstrøm | Norway | x | x | 6.10 (w: 0.3 m/s) | | | | 6.10 (w: 0.3 m/s) | |
| 12 | Olga Kucherenko | Russia | 6.09 (w: -1.3 m/s) | x | x | | | | 6.09 (w: -1.3 m/s) | |

=== Qualifications ===
14 July
Qualifying 6.25 or 12 best to the Final

==== Group A ====
| Rank | Name | Nationality | Result | Notes |
|---|---|---|---|---|
| 1 | Denisa Ščerbová | Czech Republic | 6.62 (w: 0.0 m/s) | Q |
| 2 | Amy Harris | United Kingdom | 6.37 (w: 1.0 m/s) | Q |
| 3 | Veranika Shutkova | Belarus | 6.36 (w: 1.5 m/s) | Q |
| 4 | Tania Vicenzino | Italy | 6.32 (w: 0.7 m/s) | Q |
| 5 | Olga Kucherenko | Russia | 6.24 (w: 0.8 m/s) | q |
| 6 | Euzhan Varlin | France | 6.16 (w: 1.3 m/s) | q |
| 7 | Vanya Stoyanova | Bulgaria | 6.09 (w: 0.5 m/s) | |
| 8 | Elina Sorsa | Finland | 6.09 (w: 0.1 m/s) | |
| 9 | Liliya Kulyk | Ukraine | 6.05 (w: 0.0 m/s) | |
| 10 | Stéphanie Vaucher | Switzerland | 5.95 (w: 0.2 m/s) | |
| 11 | Juliet Itoya | Spain | 5.86 (w: -0.3 m/s) | |

==== Group B ====
| Rank | Name | Nationality | Result | Notes |
|---|---|---|---|---|
| 1 | Yelena Sokolova | Russia | 6.48 (w: -0.1 m/s) | Q |
| 1 | Joanna Skibińska | Poland | 6.42 (w: 0.5 m/s) | Q |
| 3 | Natacha Vouaux | France | 6.36 (w: -0.1 m/s) | Q |
| 4 | Anna Nazarova | Russia | 6.32 (w: 0.0 m/s) | Q |
| 5 | Margrethe Renstrøm | Norway | 6.27 (w: 0.0 m/s) | Q |
| 6 | Nina Kolarič | Slovenia | 6.21 (w: 0.1 m/s) | q |
| 7 | Lauranne Osse | France | 6.13 (w: 0.0 m/s) | |
| 8 | Niki Panetta | Greece | 6.04 (w: 0.0 m/s) | |
| 9 | Erica Jarder | Sweden | 5.97 (w: 0.5 m/s) | |
| 10 | Rotem Battat | Israel | 5.68 (w: 0.1 m/s) | |
| 11 | Andriana Bânova | Bulgaria | 5.56 (w: 0.0 m/s) | |

== Participation ==
According to an unofficial count, 22 athletes from 17 countries participated in the event.

- Belarus (1)
- Bulgaria (2)
- Czech Republic (1)
- Finland (1)
- France (3)
- Greece (1)
- Israel (1)
- Italy (1)
- Norway (1)
- Poland (1)
- Russia (3)
- Slovenia (1)
- Spain (1)
- Sweden (1)
- Switzerland (1)
- Ukraine (1)
- United Kingdom (1)
