= 2006 World Junior Championships in Athletics – Women's triple jump =

The women's triple jump event at the 2006 World Junior Championships in Athletics was held in Beijing, China, at Chaoyang Sports Centre on 15 and 17 August.

== Medalists ==
Gold	Kaire Leibak; Estonia
Silver	Sha Li; China
Bronze	Liliya Kulyk; Ukraine

== Results ==
=== Final ===
17 August

Rank	Name	Nationality	Attempts						Result	Notes
Rank	Name	Nationality	1	2	3	4	5	6	Result	Notes
1st place, gold medalist(s)	Kaire Leibak	Estonia	13.84 (w: +0.3 m/s)	13.94 (w: +1.1 m/s)	13.58 (w: +0.1 m/s)	14.05 (w: +0.5 m/s)	13.61 (w: +0.9 m/s)	14.43 (w: +0.6 m/s)	14.43 (w: +0.6 m/s)	
2nd place, silver medalist(s)	Sha Li	China	13.66 (w: +0.4 m/s)	x	13.87 (w: +0.2 m/s)	13.84 (w: +1.5 m/s)	14.01 (w: +0.8 m/s)	x	14.01 (w: +0.8 m/s)	
3rd place, bronze medalist(s)	Liliya Kulyk	Ukraine	13.41 (w: +0.6 m/s)	13.75 (w: +0.2 m/s)	13.55 (w: +0.7 m/s)	13.78 (w: +0.4 m/s)	14.01 (w: +0.6 m/s)	12.55 (w: 0.0 m/s)	14.01 (w: +0.6 m/s)	
4	Patrícia Mamona	Portugal	x	13.37 (w: +0.9 m/s)	11.77 (w: +0.5 m/s)	12.93 (w: +0.2 m/s)	12.97 (w: +0.9 m/s)	x	13.37 (w: +0.9 m/s)	
5	Haoua Kessely	France	12.97 (w: +0.4 m/s)	13.16 (w: +0.5 m/s)	13.35 (w: +0.6 m/s)	13.21 (w: +0.5 m/s)	13.25 (w: +0.2 m/s)	13.34 (w: +1.1 m/s)	13.35 (w: +0.6 m/s)	
6	Cristina Bujin	Romania	13.25 (w: +0.7 m/s)	12.58 (w: +0.6 m/s)	x	12.94 (w: +0.5 m/s)	13.35 (w: +0.7 m/s)	13.16 (w: +0.5 m/s)	13.35 (w: +0.7 m/s)	
7	Natallia Viatkina	Belarus	13.15 (w: +0.7 m/s)	12.79 (w: +0.6 m/s)	12.89 (w: +0.2 m/s)	12.77 (w: +0.6 m/s)	13.35 (w: +0.6 m/s)	x	13.35 (w: +0.6 m/s)	
8	Ruth Ndoumbe	Spain	11.93 (w: +0.7 m/s)	12.85 (w: +0.3 m/s)	13.23 (w: +0.3 m/s)	-	12.63 (w: +0.5 m/s)	x	13.23 (w: +0.3 m/s)	
9	Linda Allen	Australia	x	12.94 (w: +0.6 m/s)	12.84 (w: +0.4 m/s)				12.94 (w: +0.6 m/s)	
10	Yuliya Semenyuk	Ukraine	12.87 (w: +0.4 m/s)	x	12.87 (w: +0.4 m/s)				12.87 (w: +0.4 m/s)	
11	Carmen Toma	Romania	x	x	12.79 (w: +0.3 m/s)				12.79 (w: +0.3 m/s)	
12	Darya Safronova	Russia	x	x	12.28 (w: +0.7 m/s)				12.28 (w: +0.7 m/s)	

=== Qualifications ===
15 August

==== Group A ====
Rank	Name	Nationality	Attempts			Result	Notes
Rank	Name	Nationality	1	2	3	Result	Notes
1	Sha Li	China	13.97 (w: +0.2 m/s)	-	-	13.97 (w: +0.2 m/s)	Q
2	Kaire Leibak	Estonia	13.40 (w: +0.4 m/s)	-	-	13.40 (w: +0.4 m/s)	Q
3	Carmen Toma	Romania	x	13.27 (w: -0.4 m/s)	-	13.27 (w: -0.4 m/s)	Q
4	Natallia Viatkina	Belarus	12.93 (w: +0.1 m/s)	13.17 (w: -0.2 m/s)	x	13.17 (w: -0.2 m/s)	q
5	Linda Allen	Australia	12.93 (w: +0.1 m/s)	12.99 (w: -0.5 m/s)	12.91 (w: -0.3 m/s)	12.99 (w: -0.5 m/s)	q
6	Yuliya Semenyuk	Ukraine	12.97 (w: 0.0 m/s)	12.64 (w: -0.4 m/s)	12.90 (w: -0.3 m/s)	12.97 (w: 0.0 m/s)	q
7	Ke'nyia Richardson	United States	12.97 (w: +0.3 m/s)	12.57 (w: -0.3 m/s)	12.59 (w: -0.3 m/s)	12.97 (w: +0.3 m/s)	
8	Irina Litvinenko	Kazakhstan	12.80 (w: +0.2 m/s)	12.83 (w: -0.4 m/s)	12.94 (w: -0.2 m/s)	12.94 (w: -0.2 m/s)	
9	Haykanush Beklaryan	Armenia	12.78 (w: 0.0 m/s)	12.55 (w: -0.4 m/s)	11.79 (w: -0.2 m/s)	12.78 (w: 0.0 m/s)	
10	Celine Hanenberger	Germany	12.46 (w: +0.3 m/s)	12.62 (w: -0.3 m/s)	12.34 (w: -0.2 m/s)	12.62 (w: -0.3 m/s)	
11	Mia Haave	Norway	12.56 (w: +0.2 m/s)	12.51 (w: -0.4 m/s)	11.27 (w: -0.1 m/s)	12.56 (w: +0.2 m/s)	
12	Sevim Sinmez	Turkey	12.33 (w: +0.1 m/s)	x	12.36 (w: -0.1 m/s)	12.36 (w: -0.1 m/s)	
13	Andriana Banova	Bulgaria	12.07 (w: +0.2 m/s)	12.08 (w: -0.4 m/s)	x	12.08 (w: -0.4 m/s)	

==== Group B ====
Rank	Name	Nationality	Attempts			Result	Notes
Rank	Name	Nationality	1	2	3	Result	Notes
1	Darya Safronova	Russia	13.17 (w: -0.4 m/s)	13.37 (w: -0.4 m/s)	-	13.37 (w: -0.4 m/s)	Q
2	Patrícia Mamona	Portugal	x	12.95 (w: -0.4 m/s)	13.34 (w: -0.5 m/s)	13.34 (w: -0.5 m/s)	Q
3	Liliya Kulyk	Ukraine	13.03 (w: -0.1 m/s)	13.20 (w: -0.2 m/s)	-	13.20 (w: -0.2 m/s)	Q
4	Ruth Ndoumbe	Spain	x	13.14 (w: 0.0 m/s)	13.13 (w: -0.1 m/s)	13.14 (w: 0.0 m/s)	q
5	Cristina Bujin	Romania	12.95 (w: +0.1 m/s)	12.89 (w: -0.6 m/s)	13.07 (w: -0.4 m/s)	13.07 (w: -0.4 m/s)	q
6	Haoua Kessely	France	12.93 (w: -0.1 m/s)	13.05 (w: -0.5 m/s)	12.92 (w: -0.4 m/s)	13.05 (w: -0.5 m/s)	q
7	Kimberly Williams	Jamaica	12.81 (w: -0.2 m/s)	12.69 (w: -0.7 m/s)	x	12.81 (w: -0.2 m/s)	
8	Blessing Okagbare	Nigeria	12.81 (w: +0.3 m/s)	x	12.61 (w: -0.4 m/s)	12.81 (w: +0.3 m/s)	
9	Sandra Chukwu	Poland	12.69 (w: +0.1 m/s)	12.46 (w: -0.6 m/s)	12.76 (w: -0.4 m/s)	12.76 (w: -0.4 m/s)	
10	Anna Bondarenko	Kazakhstan	12.55 (w: -0.4 m/s)	x	x	12.55 (w: -0.4 m/s)	
11	Mersiha Kazic	Slovenia	x	12.02 (w: -0.5 m/s)	12.21 (w: -0.4 m/s)	12.21 (w: -0.4 m/s)	
12	Namatirai Maugara	Zimbabwe	11.41 (w: +0.4 m/s)	11.43 (w: -0.7 m/s)	11.50 (w: -0.3 m/s)	11.50 (w: -0.3 m/s)	
	Tao Yujia	China	x	-	-	NM	

== Participation ==
According to an unofficial count, 26 athletes from 22 countries participated in the event.

- Armenia (1)
- Australia (1)
- Belarus (1)
- Bulgaria (1)
- China (2)
- Estonia (1)
- France (1)
- Germany (1)
- Jamaica (1)
- Kazakhstan (2)
- Nigeria (1)
- Norway (1)
- Poland (1)
- Portugal (1)
- Romania (2)
- Russia (1)
- Slovenia (1)
- Spain (1)
- Turkey (1)
- Ukraine (2)
- United States (1)
- Zimbabwe (1)
