= Irina Ektova =

Kazakhstani triple jumper (born 1987)

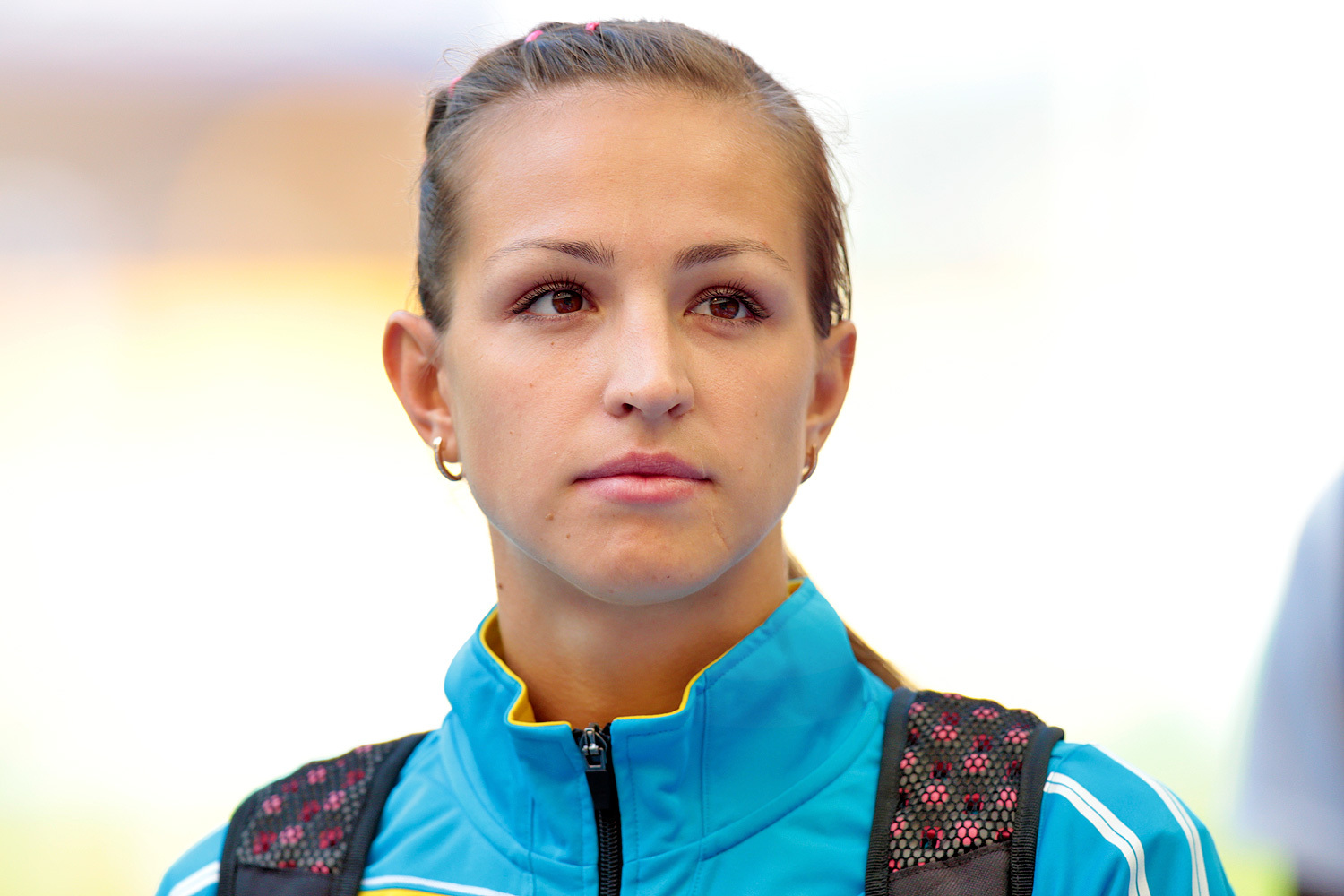
- Ektova at 2013 World Championships in Athletics

Personal information
- Native name: Ирина Андреевна Эктова
- Born: 8 January 1987 (age 39) Petropavl, Kazakh SSR, Soviet Union
- Height: 173 cm (5 ft 8 in)
- Weight: 60 kg (132 lb)

Sport
- Country: Kazakhstan
- Sport: Athletics
- Event: Triple jump
Medal record
Women's athletics
Representing Kazakhstan
Asian Championships
Bronze medal – third place	2007 Amman	Triple jump
Asian Indoor Championships
Gold medal – first place	2018 Tehran	Triple jump
Bronze medal – third place	2016 Doha	Triple jump

Irina Andreyevna Ektova (Russian: Ирина Андреевна Эктова, née Litvinenko; (Note: Russian: Литвиненко.) born 8 January 1987) is a Kazakhstani triple jumper. She is married to Yevgeniy Ektov.

She competed at the 2008, 2012, and 2016 Summer Olympics without reaching the final.

Her personal best jump is 14.48 metres, achieved in June 2011 in Almaty.

== Competition record ==
Year	Competition	Venue	Position	Event	Notes
Representing Kazakhstan
2006	World Junior Championships	Beijing, China	14th (q)	Triple jump	12.94 m (-0.2 m/s)
2007	Asian Championships	Amman, Jordan	3rd	Triple jump	13.80 m (w)
2007	Universiade	Bangkok, Thailand	13th	Triple jump	13.22 m
2007	Asian Indoor Games	Macau	1st	Triple jump	13.56 m
2008	Olympic Games	Beijing, China	32nd (q)	Triple jump	12.92 m
2009	Universiade	Belgrade, Serbia	4th	Triple jump	13.85 m
2009	World Championships	Berlin, Germany	23rd (q)	Triple jump	13.82 m
2009	Asian Indoor Games	Hanoi, Vietnam	2nd	Triple jump	13.87 m
2009	Asian Championships	Guangzhou, China	3rd	Triple jump	13.99 m
2011	Asian Championships	Kobe, Japan	6th	Triple jump	13.88 m
2011	Universiade	Shenzhen, China	13th (q)	Triple jump	13.22 m
2011	World Championships	Daegu, South Korea	17th (q)	Triple jump	14.01 m
2012	World Indoor Championships	Istanbul, Turkey	16th (q)	Triple jump	13.70 m
2012	Olympic Games	London, United Kingdom	31st (q)	Triple jump	13.39 m
2013	Universiade	Kazan, Russia	4th	Triple jump	14.13 m
2013	Asian Championships	Pune, India	3rd	Triple jump	13.75 m
2013	World Championships	Moscow, Russia	18th (q)	Triple jump	13.37 m
2014	Asian Indoor Championships	Hangzhou, China	6th	Triple jump	13.09 m
2014	Asian Games	Incheon, South Korea	3rd	Triple jump	13.77 m
2015	Asian Championships	Wuhan, China	5th	Triple jump	13.27 m
2015	Universiade	Gwangju, South Korea	6th	Triple jump	13.45 m
2015	World Championships	Beijing, China	17th (q)	Triple jump	13.61 m
2016	Asian Indoor Championships	Doha, Qatar	3rd	Triple jump	13.48 m
2016	Olympic Games	Rio de Janeiro, Brazil	33rd (q)	Triple jump	13.33 m
2017	Asian Championships	Bhubaneswar, India	2nd	Triple jump	13.62 m
2017	Asian Indoor and Martial Arts Games	Ashgabat, Turkmenistan	–	Long jump	NM
2018	Asian Indoor Championships	Tehran, Iran	4th	Long jump	5.95 m
2018	Asian Indoor Championships	Tehran, Iran	1st	Triple jump	13.79 m
2018	Asian Games	Jakarta, Indonesia	6th	Triple jump	13.58 m
2019	Asian Championships	Doha, Qatar	4th	Triple jump	13.40 m
2021	Olympic Games	Tokyo, Japan	31st (q)	Triple jump	12.90 m
