= Kaire Leibak =

Estonian triple jumper

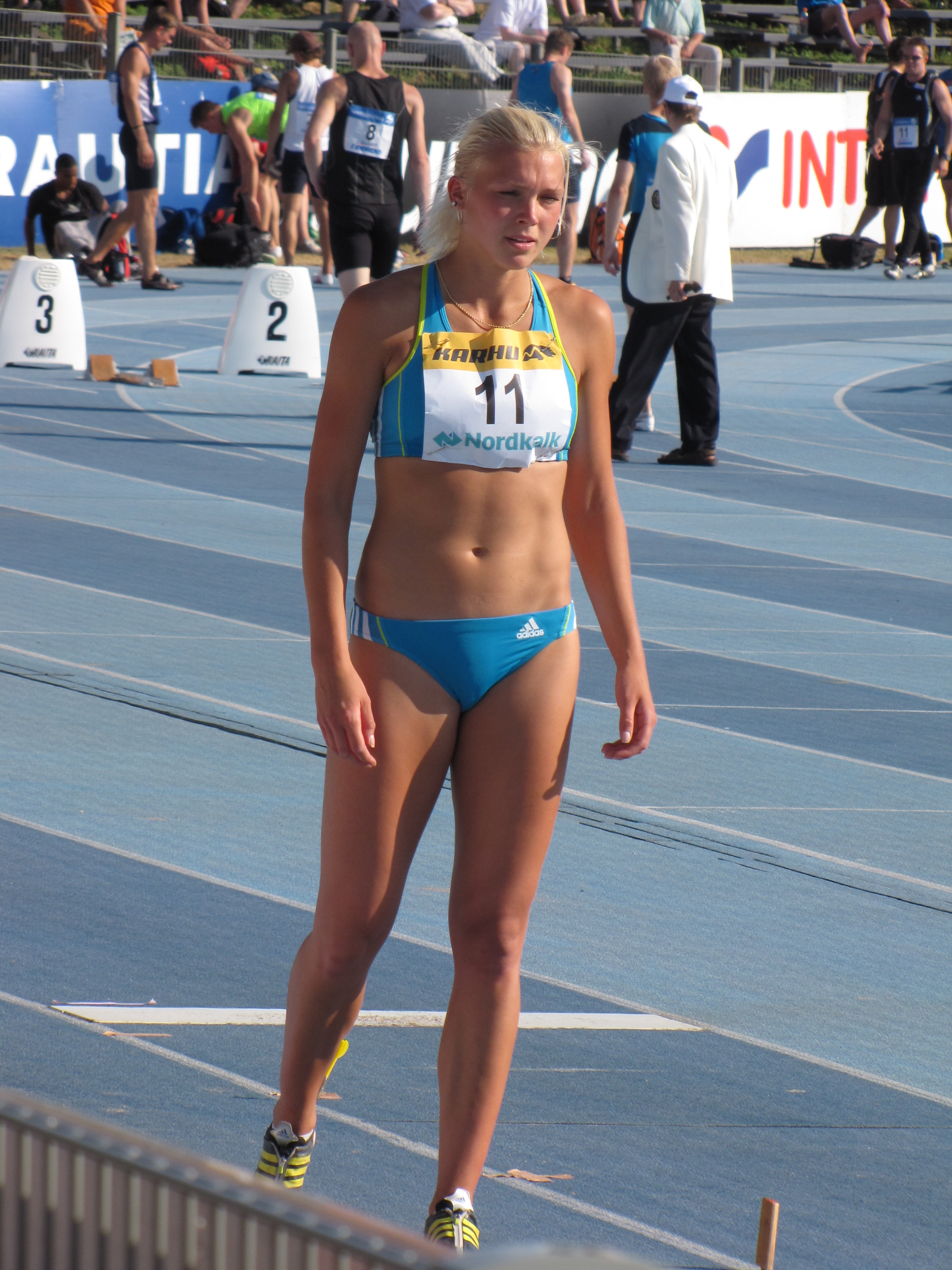
- Leibak in 2010

Personal information
- Born: 21 May 1988 (age 38) Tartu, then part of Estonian SSR, Soviet Union

Kaire Leibak (born 21 May 1988) is an Estonian retired triple jumper. Her personal best jump of 14.43 metres is the Estonian record.

She won a silver medal in the triple jump at the 2005 World Youth Championships in Athletics, where she was also seventh in the long jump. She focused solely on the triple jump from 2006 onwards and went on to win gold medals in the event at the 2006 World Junior Championships in Beijing (where she broke the national record) and the 2007 European Athletics Junior Championships.

Leibak made her senior debut in 2008 and represented Estonia at the 2008 IAAF World Indoor Championships and the 2008 Beijing Olympics. She was declared Estonian Sportspersonality of the year for her efforts. The following year she was ninth at the 2009 European Athletics Indoor Championships, but did not start the competition at the 2009 World Championships in Athletics in spite of her being selected.

She ruptured an Achilles tendon in 2010, missing the outdoor season, and later suffered a second rupture that left her unable to compete for an 18-month period. She moved to the United States and began working with an American coach, Rana Reider, who also coaches Dwight Phillips.

== Achievements ==
Year	Competition	Venue	Position	Event	Result
Representing Estonia
2005	World Youth Championships	Marrakesh, Morocco	2nd	Triple jump	13.74 PB
2005	World Youth Championships	Marrakesh, Morocco	7th	Long jump	6.11
2006	World Junior Championships	Beijing, China	1st	Triple jump	14.43 m (wind: +0.6 m/s) NR
2007	European Junior Championships	Hengelo, Netherlands	1st	Triple jump	14.02
2008	World Indoor Championships	Valencia, Spain	17th	Triple jump	13.32 m
2008	Olympic Games	Beijing, China	8th	Triple jump	14.13 m
2009	European Indoor Championships	Turin, Italy	9th	Triple jump	13.99 m
2009	European U23 Championships	Kaunas, Lithuania	4th	Triple jump	13.72 m (wind: 0.2 m/s)

Awards
Preceded by Deniss Karpak	Estonian Young Sports Personality of the Year; 2008	Succeeded by Liane Pintsaar
