= Hanna Demydova =

Ukrainian triple jumper

Medal record
Women's athletics
Representing Ukraine
World Youth Championships
Bronze medal – third place	2003 Sherbrooke	Long jump
European Youth Olympic Festival
Bronze medal – third place	2003 Paris	Long jump

Anna Demydova-Bråttvik (née Ganna/Hanna Demydova) (born 8 April 1987) is a Ukrainian triple jumper. She competed in the triple jump event at the 2012 Summer Olympics.

She was born to Valentin Demydov and Iryna Demydova in Sumy. She attended university in Mykolaiv, before going on to do a master's degree in sport management at the University of Southern Mississippi in the United States. She also competed collegiately for the Southern Miss Golden Eagles and won the Conference USA indoor and outdoor titles, as well as having a fourth-place finish at the NCAA Indoor Championships and a third-place finish at the NCAA Outdoor Championships in 2011, as well as winning the Nationals (NCAA Women's Division I Outdoor Track and Field Championships) at the end of her collegiate career in 2012. She finished her time at the institution having broken the school, conference (Conference USA) and NCAA (Women's Division I) records for the triple jump both indoors and outdoors.

== Competition record ==
Year	Competition	Venue	Position	Event	Notes
Representing Ukraine
2003	World Youth Championships	Sherbrooke, Canada	3rd	Long jump	6.15 m
2004	World Junior Championships	Grosseto, Italy	9th	Long jump	5.99 m (wind: -0.4 m/s)
2005	European Junior Championships	Kaunas, Lithuania	10th	Long jump	5.94 m
2012	European Championships	Helsinki, Finland	18th (q)	Triple jump	13.72 m
2012	Olympic Games	London, United Kingdom	15th (q)	Triple jump	13.97 m
