= Ruslana Tsykhotska =

Ukrainian triple jumper

Personal information
- Born: 23 March 1986 (age 40)
- Height: 1.65 m (5 ft 5 in)
- Weight: 56 kg (123 lb)

Sport
- Sport: Athletics
- Event: Triple jump

Ruslana Tsykhotska (Ukrainian: Руслана Цихоцька; born 23 March 1986) is a Ukrainian athlete specialising in the triple jump. She represented her country at the 2016 Summer Olympics as well as the 2011 and 2013 World Championships.

== International competitions ==
Year	Competition	Venue	Position	Event	Notes
Representing Ukraine
2011	World Championships	Daegu, South Korea	32nd (q)	Triple jump	13.28 m
2011	Military World Games	Rio de Janeiro, Brazil	3rd	Long jump	6.23 m
2011	Military World Games	Rio de Janeiro, Brazil	3rd	Triple jump	14.05 m
2012	World Indoor Championships	Istanbul, Turkey	27th (q)	Triple jump	13.21 m
2012	European Championships	Helsinki, Finland	17th (q)	Triple jump	13.87 m
2013	World Championships	Moscow, Russia	16th (q)	Triple jump	13.51 m
2016	Olympic Games	Rio de Janeiro, Brazil	26th (q)	Triple jump	13.63 m
2017	European Indoor Championships	Belgrade, Serbia	16th (q)	Triple jump	13.31 m

== Personal bests ==
Outdoor

- Long jump – 6.44 (-0.6 m/s, Yalta 2011)
- Triple jump – 14.53 (+1.0 m/s, Yalta 2012)

Indoor

- Long jump – 6.40 (Sumy 2012)
- Triple jump – 14.00 (Kiev 2012)
