= Ruth Ndoumbe =

Spanish triple jumper (born 1987)

Personal information
- Nationality: Spanish
- Born: Ruth Marie Ndoumbe Nvumba; 1 January 1987 (age 38) Madrid, Spain

Sport
- Sport: Track and field
- Event(s): Triple jump, high jump

Ruth Marie Ndoumbe Nvumba (born 1 January 1987) is a Spanish former track and field athlete specializing in the triple jump and high jump.

== Early life ==
Ndoumbe was born in Madrid to a Cameroonian father and an Equatorial Guinean mother.

== Competition record ==
Year	Competition	Venue	Position	Event	Notes
Representing Spain
2003	World Youth Championships	Sherbrooke, Canada	25th (q)	High jump	1.70 m
2006	World Junior Championships	Beijing, China	8th	Triple jump	13.23 m (wind: +0.3 m/s)
2007	European U23 Championships	Debrecen, Hungary	11th	Triple jump	12.86 m
2009	European U23 Championships	Kaunas, Lithuania	23rd (q)	High jump	1.72 m
2009	European U23 Championships	Kaunas, Lithuania	10th	Triple jump	13.19 m
2014	European Championships	Zürich, Switzerland	4th	Triple jump	14.14 m
2015	European Indoor Championships	Prague, Czech Republic	12th (q)	Triple jump	13.80 m

== Personal bests ==
Outdoor

- High jump – 1.85 (Córdoba 2003)
- Triple jump – 14.15 (Alcobendas 2014)

Indoor

- Triple jump – 13.62 (Sabadell 2014)
