= Aleksandra Zelenina =

Moldovan athletics competitor

Aleksandra Zelenina (born 21 November 1986) is a Moldovan retired athlete who specialized in the long and triple jump events.

She was born in Bendery. She finished twelfth in the triple jump at the 2005 Summer Universiade. She competed in both long and triple jump at the 2006 European Championships, but failed to qualify for the final round.

Her personal best long jump was 6.51 metres, achieved in June 2005 in Chişinău. In the triple jump she had 13.91 metres, achieved in July 2006 in Minsk.

== Competition record ==
Year	Competition	Venue	Position	Event	Notes
Representing Moldova
2003	World Youth Championships	Sherbrooke, Canada	32nd (q)	Long jump	5.45 m
2003	World Youth Championships	Sherbrooke, Canada	6th	Triple jump	12.79 m
2005	European Junior Championships	Kaunas, Lithuania	18th (q)	Long jump	5.77 m
2005	European Junior Championships	Kaunas, Lithuania	6th	Triple jump	12.99 m
2005	Universiade	İzmir, Turkey	27th (q)	Long jump	5.79 m
2005	Universiade	İzmir, Turkey	12th	Triple jump	12.82 m
2006	European Championships	Gothenburg, Sweden	28th (q)	Long jump	5.59 m
2006	European Championships	Gothenburg, Sweden	21st (q)	Triple jump	13.12 m
2007	European U23 Championships	Debrecen, Hungary	8th	Triple jump	13.46 m (wind: 1.0 m/s)
