= Niki Panetta =

Greek triple jumper

Personal information
- Born: 21 April 1986 (age 40)
- Height: 1.72 m (5 ft 7 1/2 in)
- Weight: 53 kg (117 lb)

Sport
- Country: Greece
- Sport: Athletics
- Event: Triple jump

Achievements and titles
- Personal bests: 14.55 m (2011); 14.47 m (2012)
- Updated on 15 August 2012

Niki Panetta (Greek: Νίκη Πανέτα); born 21 April 1986 in Ilion, Athens is a Greek triple jumper.

She finished sixth at the 2012 European Championships. Her personal best is 14.55 metres achieved in Athens on 7 July 2011. At the indoor truck she has jumped 14.47 metres on 22 February 2012 in Piraeus.

== Competition record ==
Year	Competition	Venue	Position	Event	Notes
Representing Greece
2007	European U23 Championships	Debrecen, Hungary	17th (q)	Long jump	6.04 m (wind: 0.0 m/s)
2007	European U23 Championships	Debrecen, Hungary	6th	Triple jump	13.71 m (wind: 0.1 m/s)
2011	World Championships	Daegu, South Korea	20th (q)	Triple jump	13.97 m
2012	World Indoor Championships	Istanbul, Turkey	11th (q)	Triple jump	13.98 m
2012	European Championships	Helsinki, Finland	6th	Triple jump	14.23 m
2012	Olympic Games	London, United Kingdom	24th (q)	Triple jump	13.66 m
2013	European Indoor Championships	Gothenburg, Sweden	13th (q)	Triple jump	13.55 m
2013	Mediterranean Games	Mersin, Turkey	6th	Triple jump	13.69 m
2013	World Championships	Moscow, Russia	15th (q)	Triple jump	13.69 m
