= Veronika Mosina =

Russian triple jumper

Veronika Mosina (born 17 October 1990 in Saint Petersburg) is a Russian triple jumper. She competed in the triple jump event at the 2012 Summer Olympics.

== Competition record ==
Year	Competition	Venue	Position	Event	Notes
Representing Russia
2012	Olympic Games	London, United Kingdom	17th (q)	Triple jump	13.96 m
2013	European Indoor Championships	Gothenburg, Sweden	4th	Triple jump	14.21 m
2014	World Indoor Championships	Sopot, Poland	9th (q)	Triple jump	13.68 m
