= Andriana Bânova =

Bulgarian triple jumper

Andriana Banova (Bulgarian: Андриана Бънова) (born 1 May 1987 in Pleven) is a Bulgarian triple jumper. She competed in the triple jump event at the 2012 Summer Olympics.

== Competition record ==
Year	Competition	Venue	Position	Event	Notes
Representing Bulgaria
2005	European Junior Championships	Kaunas, Lithuania	21st (q)	Long jump	5.23 m
2005	European Junior Championships	Kaunas, Lithuania	8th	Triple jump	12.75 m
2006	World Junior Championships	Beijing, China	23rd (q)	Triple jump	12.08 m (wind: -0.4 m/s)
2007	European U23 Championships	Debrecen, Hungary	22nd (q)	Long jump	5.56 m
2007	European U23 Championships	Debrecen, Hungary	9th	Triple jump	13.25 m
2009	European U23 Championships	Kaunas, Lithuania	9th	Triple jump	13.20 m
2010	European Championships	Barcelona, Spain	18th (q)	Triple jump	13.95 m
2011	European Indoor Championships	Paris, France	20th (q)	Triple jump	13.05 m
2011	World Championships	Daegu, South Korea	26th (q)	Triple jump	13.66 m
2012	World Indoor Championships	Istanbul, Turkey	25th (q)	Triple jump	13.50 m
2012	European Championships	Helsinki, Finland	–	Triple jump	NM
2012	Olympic Games	London, United Kingdom	32nd (q)	Triple jump	13.33 m
2014	European Championships	Zürich, Switzerland	19th (q)	Triple jump	13.36 m
