= Sha Li =

Chinese triple jumper (born 1988)

Medal record

Women's athletics

Representing China

Asian Championships
Silver medal – second place	2007 Amman	Triple jump

Sha Li (born 14 August 1988) is a Chinese triple jumper.

== Achievements ==
Year	Competition	Venue	Position	Event	Notes
Representing China
2004	Asian Junior Championships	Ipoh, Malaysia	2nd	Triple jump	13.21 m
2005	World Youth Championships	Marrakesh, Morocco	18th (q)	Long jump	5.91 m (w)
2005	World Youth Championships	Marrakesh, Morocco	1st	Triple jump	13.81 m
2006	World Junior Championships	Beijing, China	2nd	Triple jump	14.01 m (wind: +0.8 m/s) (PB)
2007	Asian Championships	Amman, Jordan	2nd	Triple jump	14.03 m (w)

=== Personal bests ===
- Long jump – 6.31 m (2007)
- Triple jump – 14.01 m (2006)
