= Sevim Sinmez Serbest =

Turkish athletics competitor

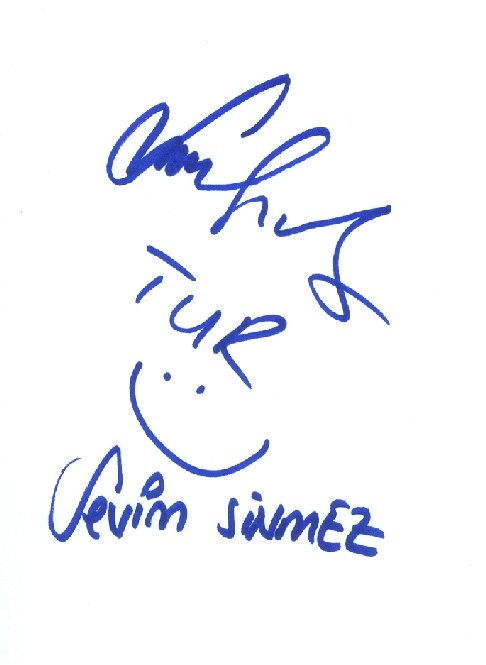
- Signature of athlete

Personal information
- Born: 20 April 1987 (age 39) Mersin, Turkey
Medal record
Representing Turkey
Balkan Athletics Indoor Championships
Bronze medal – third place	2012 Istanbul	Triple jump
Bronze medal – third place	2013 Istanbul	Long jump
Bronze medal – third place	2013 Istanbul	Triple jump
Islamic Solidarity Games
Silver medal – second place	2013 Palembang	High jump

Sevim Sinmez Serbest (born 20 April 1987 in Mersin) is a Turkish track and field athlete competing in high jump, long jump and triple jump.

== International competitions ==
Year	Competition	Venue	Position	Event	Notes
Representing Turkey
2006	World Junior Championships	Beijing, China	22nd (q)	Triple jump	12.36 m
2007	European U23 Championships	Debrecen, Hungary	16th (q)	Triple jump	12.14 m
2012	Balkan Indoor Championships	Istanbul, Turkey	3rd	Triple jump	13.48 m
2012	World Indoor Championships	Istanbul, Turkey	28th (q)	Triple jump	13.13 m
2012	Balkan Games	Eskişehir, Turkey	6th	Triple jump	11.34 m
2013	Balkan Indoor Championships	Istanbul, Turkey	3rd	Long jump	6,34 m
2013	Balkan Indoor Championships	Istanbul, Turkey	3rd	Triple jump	13,37 m
2013	European Indoor Championships	Gothenburg, Sweden	18th (q)	Long jump	5.97 m
2013	European Indoor Championships	Gothenburg, Sweden	x	Triple jump	NM
2013	European Team Championships	Gateshead, United Kingdom	11th	Long jump	5.94 m
2013	European Team Championships	Gateshead, United Kingdom	11th	Triple jump	12,78 m
2013	Mediterranean Games	Mersin, Turkey	10th	Long jump	5.61 m
2013	Mediterranean Games	Mersin, Turkey	5th	Triple jump	13,75 m
2013	Universiade	Kazan, Russia	18th (q)	Long jump	5.90 m
2013	Universiade	Kazan, Russia	9th	Triple jump	13,31 m
2013	Balkan Games	Stara Zagora, Bulgaria	6th	Long jump	5.71 m
2013	Balkan Games	Stara Zagora, Bulgaria	4th	Triple jump	13,29 m
2013	Islamic Solidarity Games	Palembang, Indonesia	2nd	High jump	1.65 m
2013	Islamic Solidarity Games	Palembang, Indonesia	4th	Triple jump	12,81 m
2014	European Team Championships	Braunschweig, Germany	11th	Triple jump	12.86 m
2014	Balkan Games	Pitești, Romania	7th	Long jump	5.90 m
2014	Balkan Games	Pitești, Romania	5th	Triple jump	13,08 m
2014	European Championships	Zürich, Switzerland	22nd (q)	Triple jump	12.38 m
2015	Balkan Indoor Championships	Istanbul, Turkey	6th	Triple jump	12.62 m

== Personal bests ==
Event	Best	Wind	Venue	Date
Long jump (outdoor)	6.36 m	1.8 ms	Eskişehir, Turkey	9 June 2013
Long jump (indoor)	6.37 m	NA	Istanbul, Turkey	3 February 2013
Triple jump (outdoor)	13.95 m	1.1 ms	Istanbul, Turkey	15 June 2013
Triple jump (indoor)	13.64 m	NA	Istanbul, Turkey	9 February 2013

Last updated 28 July 2015.

== General references ==
- Sevim Sinmez Serbest at World Athletics
