= Anna Krylova =

Russian triple jumper

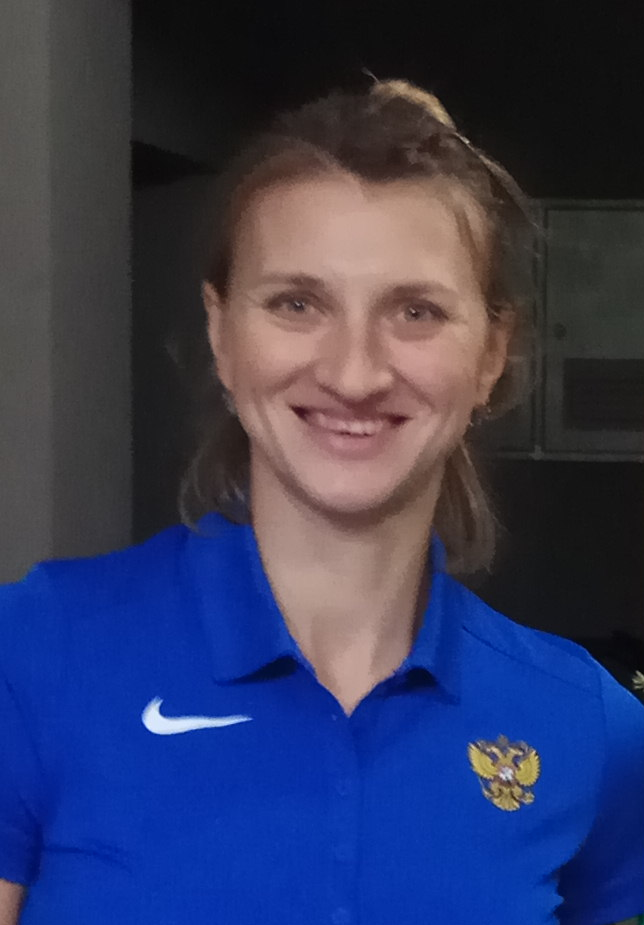

Personal information
- Full name: Anna Anatolyevna Kuropatkina
- Nationality: Russian
- Born: 3 October 1985 (age 40) Kamensk-Shakhtinsky, Rostov Oblast, RSFSR, USSR

Sport
- Country: Russia
- Sport: Athletics
- Event: Triple Jump

Anna Anatolyevna Krylova (née Kuropatkina) (Russian: Анна Анатольевна Крылова; born 3 October 1985) is a Russian triple jumper.

== Achievements ==
Year	Competition	Venue	Position	Event	Notes
Representing Russia
2007	European U23 Championships	Debrecen, Hungary	4th	Triple jump	13.92 m (+0.4 m/s)
2007	Universiade	Bangkok, Thailand	8th	Triple jump	13.59 m
2011	World Championships	Daegu, South Korea	7th	Triple jump	14.23 m
2012	World Indoor Championships	Istanbul, Turkey	6th	Triple jump	14.21 m
Competing as neutral
2018	World Indoor Championships	Birmingham, United Kingdom	15th	Triple jump	13.75 m
2018	European Championships	Berlin, Germany	27th (q)	Triple jump	13.05 m
