= 2004 World Junior Championships in Athletics – Women's long jump =

The women's long jump event at the 2004 World Junior Championships in Athletics was held in Grosseto, Italy, at Stadio Olimpico Carlo Zecchini on 16 and 17 July.

== Medalists ==
| Gold | Denisa Ščerbová; Czech Republic |
| Silver | Sophie Krauel; Germany |
| Bronze | Veronika Shutkova; Belarus |

== Results ==
=== Final ===
17 July

| Rank | Name | Nationality | Attempts | | | | | | Result | Notes |
| Rank | Name | Nationality | 1 | 2 | 3 | 4 | 5 | 6 | Result | Notes |
|---|---|---|---|---|---|---|---|---|---|---|
| 1st place, gold medalist(s) | Denisa Ščerbová | Czech Republic | 6.61 (w: -0.3 m/s) | x | 6.21 (w: -0.4 m/s) | x | x | 6.34 (w: -0.2 m/s) | 6.61 (w: -0.3 m/s) | |
| 2nd place, silver medalist(s) | Sophie Krauel | Germany | x | 6.47 (w: +0.2 m/s) | 6.44 (w: -0.1 m/s) | 6.45 (w: +0.4 m/s) | x | x | 6.47 (w: +0.2 m/s) | |
| 3rd place, bronze medalist(s) | Veronika Shutkova | Belarus | 6.08 (w: +0.2 m/s) | x | x | 6.04 (w: -0.2 m/s) | x | 6.22 (w: 0.0 m/s) | 6.22 (w: 0.0 m/s) | |
| 4 | Jacinta Boyd | Australia | 6.02 (w: +0.1 m/s) | x | 5.95 (w: -0.1 m/s) | 5.91 (w: +0.3 m/s) | 6.20 (w: +0.4 m/s) | x | 6.20 (w: +0.4 m/s) | |
| 5 | Yudelkis Fernández | Cuba | 5.48 (w: -0.2 m/s) | 5.81 (w: 0.0 m/s) | 6.16 (w: +0.1 m/s) | 5.67 (w: -0.1 m/s) | 5.73 (w: 0.0 m/s) | 6.18 (w: -0.4 m/s) | 6.18 (w: -0.4 m/s) | |
| 6 | Amy Menlove | United States | 6.08 (w: +0.2 m/s) | x | 4.49 (w: -0.4 m/s) | 5.83 (w: +0.2 m/s) | 6.11 (w: 0.0 m/s) | 6.16 (w: +0.8 m/s) | 6.16 (w: +0.8 m/s) | |
| 7 | Naomi Bligh | Australia | 6.03 (w: -0.1 m/s) | 5.99 (w: -0.1 m/s) | 6.04 (w: -0.2 m/s) | x | 6.06 (w: +0.1 m/s) | 5.95 (w: +0.5 m/s) | 6.06 (w: +0.1 m/s) | |
| 8 | Tania Vicenzino | Italy | 6.05 (w: +0.2 m/s) | 5.83 (w: -0.7 m/s) | 5.91 (w: -0.2 m/s) | 5.80 (w: +0.1 m/s) | 5.99 (w: +0.3 m/s) | 5.83 (w: +0.3 m/s) | 6.05 (w: +0.2 m/s) | |
| 9 | Zhanna Demydova | Ukraine | 5.90 (w: 0.0 m/s) | 5.99 (w: -0.4 m/s) | x | | | | 5.99 (w: -0.4 m/s) | |
| 10 | Anika Leipold | Germany | 5.88 (w: +0.5 m/s) | 5.98 (w: +0.7 m/s) | 5.93 (w: +0.2 m/s) | | | | 5.98 (w: +0.7 m/s) | |
| 11 | Michelle Sanford | United States | 5.66 (w: -0.1 m/s) | 5.71 (w: +0.1 m/s) | 5.90 (w: -0.3 m/s) | | | | 5.90 (w: -0.3 m/s) | |
| 12 | Inna Kazantseva | Russia | 4.83 (w: +0.4 m/s) | 5.86 (w: +0.2 m/s) | 5.87 (w: +0.3 m/s) | | | | 5.87 (w: +0.3 m/s) | |

=== Qualifications ===
16 July

==== Group A ====
| Rank | Name | Nationality | Attempts | | | Result | Notes |
| Rank | Name | Nationality | 1 | 2 | 3 | Result | Notes |
|---|---|---|---|---|---|---|---|
| 1 | Sophie Krauel | Germany | x | 6.59 (w: +0.8 m/s) | - | 6.59 (w: +0.8 m/s) | Q |
| 2 | Zhanna Demydova | Ukraine | 5.97 (w: -0.1 m/s) | 6.12 (w: -1.5 m/s) | 6.09 (w: -0.9 m/s) | 6.12 (w: -1.5 m/s) | q |
| 3 | Jacinta Boyd | Australia | 5.80 (w: 0.0 m/s) | 6.07 (w: -0.3 m/s) | 6.01 (w: -0.7 m/s) | 6.07 (w: -0.3 m/s) | q |
| 4 | Yudelkis Fernández | Cuba | 5.63 (w: -0.8 m/s) | 5.95 (w: -0.8 m/s) | 6.04 (w: -0.9 m/s) | 6.04 (w: -0.9 m/s) | q |
| 5 | Michelle Sanford | United States | 5.98 (w: -0.6 m/s) | x | 5.87 (w: 0.0 m/s) | 5.98 (w: -0.6 m/s) | q |
| 6 | Peta-Gaye Beckford | Jamaica | 3.10 (w: -0.8 m/s) | 5.81 (w: -0.4 m/s) | 5.91 (w: -0.8 m/s) | 5.91 (w: -0.8 m/s) | |
| 7 | Eléni-María Kafoúrou | Greece | 5.89 (w: -0.8 m/s) | 5.64 (w: 0.0 m/s) | 5.85 (w: -0.5 m/s) | 5.89 (w: -0.8 m/s) | |
| 8 | Qi Ling | China | 5.64 (w: -0.6 m/s) | 5.64 (w: -1.6 m/s) | x | 5.64 (w: -0.6 m/s) | |
| 9 | Cristina Bujin | Romania | x | x | 5.47 (w: -1.8 m/s) | 5.47 (w: -1.8 m/s) | |
| 10 | Anna Nazarova | Russia | x | x | 5.45 (w: -0.4 m/s) | 5.45 (w: -0.4 m/s) | |
| 11 | Silvienne Krosendijk | Aruba | 5.23 (w: +0.8 m/s) | 5.20 (w: +0.6 m/s) | 5.36 (w: +0.1 m/s) | 5.36 (w: +0.1 m/s) | |

==== Group B ====
| Rank | Name | Nationality | Attempts | | | Result | Notes |
| Rank | Name | Nationality | 1 | 2 | 3 | Result | Notes |
|---|---|---|---|---|---|---|---|
| 1 | Denisa Ščerbová | Czech Republic | 6.16 (w: -1.2 m/s) | 6.34 (w: -0.6 m/s) | - | 6.34 (w: -0.6 m/s) | q |
| 2 | Inna Kazantseva | Russia | 5.92 (w: -0.7 m/s) | 6.21 (w: -0.8 m/s) | 5.81 (w: -0.7 m/s) | 6.21 (w: -0.8 m/s) | q |
| 3 | Tania Vicenzino | Italy | 6.18 (w: -0.4 m/s) | 6.00 (w: -0.6 m/s) | 6.05 (w: -1.2 m/s) | 6.18 (w: -0.4 m/s) | q |
| 4 | Anika Leipold | Germany | x | 6.09 (w: +0.3 m/s) | x | 6.09 (w: +0.3 m/s) | q |
| 5 | Amy Menlove | United States | 6.06 (w: -1.0 m/s) | 5.81 (w: -1.0 m/s) | 5.83 (w: -1.3 m/s) | 6.06 (w: -1.0 m/s) | q |
| 6 | Naomi Bligh | Australia | 6.01 (w: +0.8 m/s) | x | 6.03 (w: -1.2 m/s) | 6.03 (w: -1.2 m/s) | q |
| 7 | Veronika Shutkova | Belarus | x | 6.03 (w: -0.8 m/s) | 3.94 (w: -0.5 m/s) | 6.03 (w: -0.8 m/s) | q |
| 8 | Latifa Ezziraoui | Morocco | 5.94 (w: 0.0 m/s) | x | 5.88 (w: -1.7 m/s) | 5.94 (w: 0.0 m/s) | |
| 9 | Darinka Yotova | Bulgaria | 5.54 (w: -1.2 m/s) | 5.93 (w: -0.3 m/s) | 5.87 (w: -0.5 m/s) | 5.93 (w: -0.3 m/s) | |
| 10 | Rhonda Watkins | Trinidad and Tobago | 5.82 (w: -0.2 m/s) | 5.62 (w: -1.0 m/s) | 5.92 (w: -0.2 m/s) | 5.92 (w: -0.2 m/s) | |
| 11 | Cornelia Deiac | Romania | 4.85 (w: -0.7 m/s) | 5.37 (w: -1.1 m/s) | x | 5.37 (w: -1.1 m/s) | |

== Participation ==
According to an unofficial count, 22 athletes from 17 countries participated in the event.

- Aruba (1)
- Australia (2)
- Belarus (1)
- Bulgaria (1)
- China (1)
- Cuba (1)
- Czech Republic (1)
- Germany (2)
- Greece (1)
- Italy (1)
- Jamaica (1)
- Morocco (1)
- Romania (2)
- Russia (2)
- Trinidad and Tobago (1)
- Ukraine (1)
- United States (2)
