= Athletics at the 2005 Summer Universiade – Women's triple jump =

The women's triple jump event at the 2005 Summer Universiade was held on 19 August in İzmir, Turkey.

== Results ==
Rank	Athlete	Nationality	#1	#2	#3	#4	#5	#6	Result	Notes
1st place, gold medalist(s)	Wang Ying	China	13.37	x	x	13.64	13.85	14.12	14.12	PB
2nd place, silver medalist(s)	Olha Saladuha	Ukraine	13.40	13.93	13.87	13.80	13.83	13.96	13.96	
3rd place, bronze medalist(s)	Nadezhda Bazhenova	Russia	13.90	13.86	13.75	x	13.71	13.87	13.90	
4	Teija Hannila	Finland	12.98	x	13.36	13.19	13.64	x	13.64	
5	Veera Baranova	Estonia	13.21	13.36	13.17	13.22	13.46	13.60	13.60	
6	Lyudmila Kolchanova	Russia	13.29	13.38	13.26	x	13.24	–	13.38	SB
7	Dominike Nkiruka	Nigeria	13.18	12.93	13.34	13.06	x	12.91	13.34	
8	Dimitra Markou	Greece	12.86	13.08	13.19	x	x	13.02	13.19	
9	Thitima Muangjan	Thailand	x	13.10	12.98				13.10	
10	Duan Hongjie	China	x	12.96	12.68				12.96	SB
11	Chinonye Ohadugha	Nigeria	12.85	12.91	x				12.91	
12	Alexandra Zelenina	Moldova	12.57	12.82	12.74				12.82	
13	Silvia Otto	Germany	x	12.58	x				12.58	
14	Yang Ya-Wen	Chinese Taipei	x	12.32	x				12.32	
15	Çağdaş Arslan	Turkey	11.66	12.21	11.89				12.21	
	Nana Blakime	Togo	x	x	x				NM	
	Wang Kuo-Huei	Chinese Taipei	x	x	x				NM	
