= 2007 Asian Athletics Championships – Women's triple jump =

The women's triple jump event at the 2007 Asian Athletics Championships was held in Amman, Jordan on July 28.

== Results ==
Rank	Name	Nationality	Result	Notes
1st place, gold medalist(s)	Olga Rypakova	Kazakhstan	14.69	CR
2nd place, silver medalist(s)	Sha Li	China	14.03w	
3rd place, bronze medalist(s)	Irina Litvinenko	Kazakhstan	13.80w	
4	Fumiyo Yoshida	Japan	13.31w	
5	Fadwa Al-Bouza	Syria	12.79	
6	Rahima Sardi	Kyrgyzstan	12.75	
	Shifa Anabtawi	Jordan	NM	
