= Tania Vicenzino =

Italian long jumper

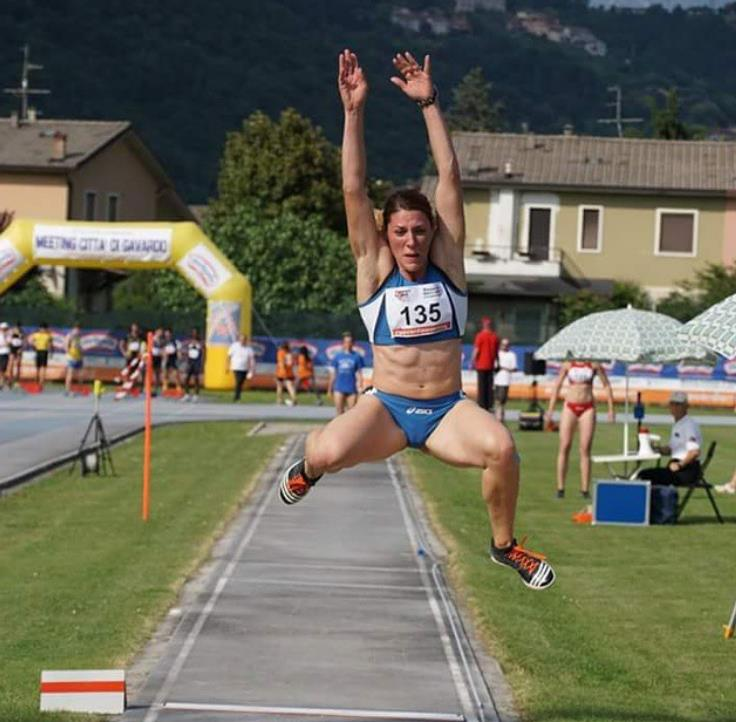
- Tania Vicenzino in 2015

Personal information
- Nationality: Italian
- Born: 1 April 1986 (age 40) Palmanova, Italy
- Height: 1.67 m (5 ft 6 in)
- Weight: 61 kg (134 lb)

Sport
- Country: Italy
- Sport: Athletics; Bobsleigh
- Event: Long jump
- Club: C.S. Esercito
- Coached by: Davide Di Chiara

Achievements and titles
- Personal bests: Long jump outdoor: 6.65 m (2014); Long jump indoor: 6.68 m (2019)
Medal record
Athletics
Mediterranean Games
Gold medal – first place	2009 Pescara	Long jump
Bronze medal – third place	2013 Mersin	Long jump

Tania Vicenzino (born 1 April 1986, in Palmanova) is an Italian long jumper. In the season 2018-2019 and 2019-2020 she also competed as bobsledder also at the IBSF World Championships 2020.

== Biography ==
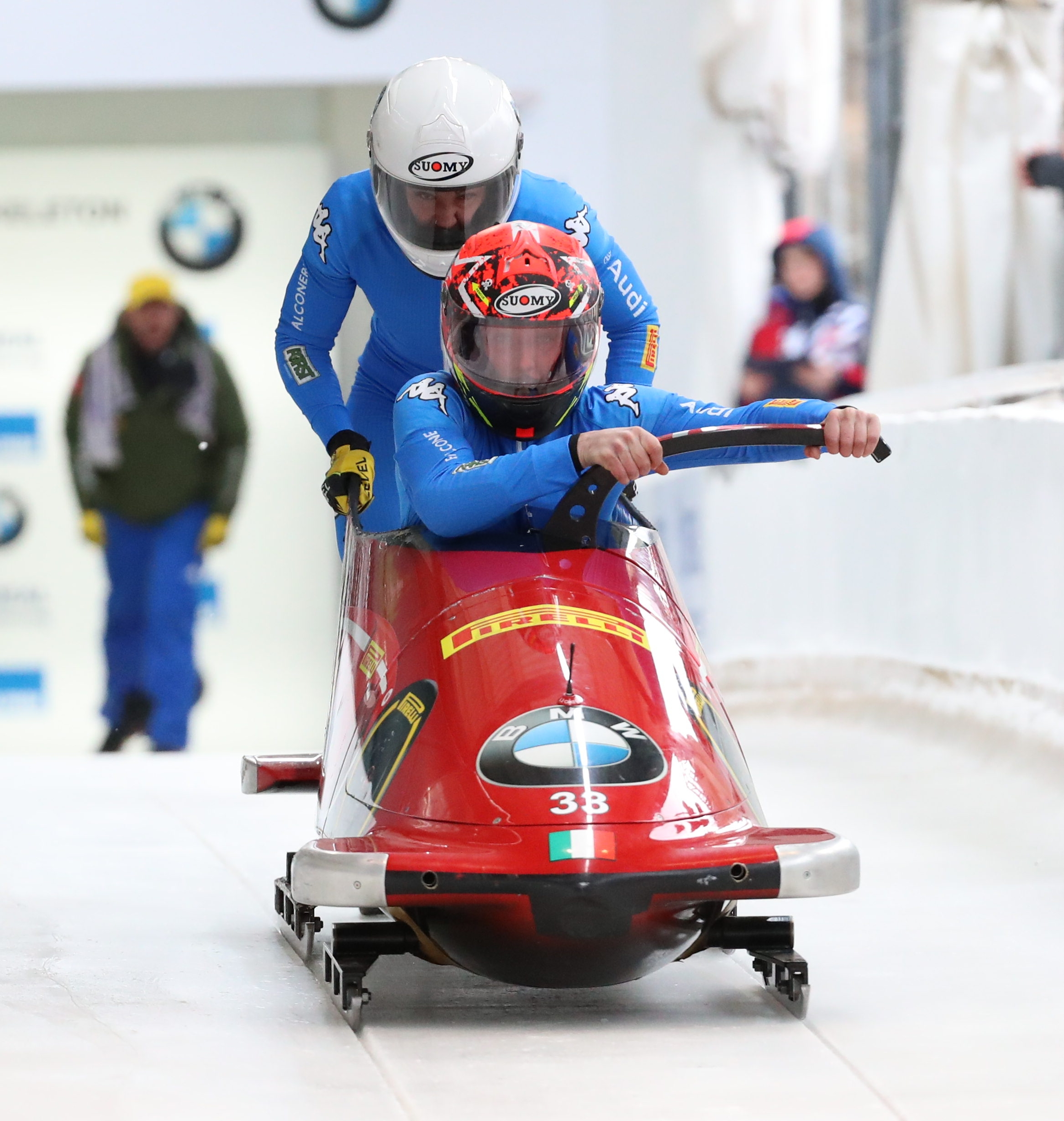
Vicenzino (red helmet) driving her bobsled at the IBSF World Championships 2020.

In her career she won the national championships twelve times. She is engaged to the discus thrower Hannes Kirchler.

== Progression ==
Personal best

Year	Age	Measure	Venue	Date	World Rank	Notes
2019	33	6.68 m	(United Kingdom) Glasgow	2 March	6th	
2018	32	6.52 m	(Italy) Ancona	17 February		
2017	31	6.47 m	(Italy) Ancona	18 February		
2016	30	6.40 m	(Italy) Gavardo	29 May		
2015	29	6.59 m	(Germany) Weinheim	30 May		
2014	28	6.65 m	(Italy) Gavardo	18 May		
2013	27	6.50 m	(Italy) Nembro	3 July		
2012	26	6.57 m	(Italy) Chiasso	20 June		
2011	25	6.54 m	(Italy) Brugnera	3 September		
2010	24	6.36 m	(Italy) Grosseto	1 July		
2009	23	6.54 m	(Italy) Pescara	1 July		
2008	22	6.52 m	(France) Annecy	22 June		
2007	21	6.50 m	(Italy) Padoa	28 July		
2006	20	6.06 m	(Italy) Rome	18 June		
2005	19	6.11 m	(Italy) Palmanova	1 May		
2004	18	6.18 m	(Italy) Grosseto	16 July		
2003	17	6.08 m	(Italy) Borgo Valsugana	15 June		

== Achievements ==
Year	Competition	Venue	Position	Event	Performance	Notes
Athletics
2004	World Junior Championships	(Italy) Grosseto	8th	Long jump	6.05 m	(wind: +0.2 m/s)
2007	European U23 Championships	(Hungary) Debrecen	5th	Long jump	6.50 m	(wind: 0.1 m/s)
2009	Mediterranean Games	(Italy) Pescara	1st	Long jump	6.54 m	PB
2013	Mediterranean Games	(Turkey) Mersin	3rd	Long jump	6.38 m	
2014	European Championships	(Switzerland) Zürich	20th	Long jump	6.22 m	Qual
2018	Mediterranean Games	(Spain) Tarragona	10th	Long jump	6.28 m	
2019	European Indoor Championships	(United Kingdom) Glasgow	6th	Long jump	6.58 m	
Bobsleigh
2020	World Championships	(Germany) Altenberg	Ret	Two	1:01.28	1st run

== Crash ==
2020 Altenberg Germany

== National titles ==
Vicenzino won 12 national titles at senior level.

- Italian Athletics Championships
  - Long jump: 2007, 2008, 2009, 2010, 2011, 2012, 2013, 2014, 2019 (9 wins)
- Italian Athletics Indoor Championships
  - Long jump: 2009, 2018, 2019 (3 wins)

== See also ==
- Italian all-time lists - Long jump
- List of multi-sport athletes
