= Bill Vicenzino =

Australian academic

Bill Vicenzino is a physiotherapy scholar who holds a chair in sports physiotherapy at the University of Queensland's School of Health and Rehabilitation Sciences, where he also directs the Sports Injuries Rehabilitation and Prevention for Health research unit. Vicenzino's research focus is in the fields of lower limb musculoskeletal pain and injury, in particular tendinopathy of the elbow, hip, knee, and heel, and knee cap problems or pain (patellofemoral pain). His publications include works on the effectiveness of cortisone shots for tennis elbow, and diagnostics for gluteal tendinopathy, a type of hip tendon injury caused by overuse.

Vicenzino did his undergraduate education at University of Queensland, where he also has a master's degree; he has graduate diplomas in sports physiotherapy and manipulative therapy from the Curtin University, and a PhD in physiotherapy from the University of Queensland.

Vicenzino is a coauthor, with Wayne Hing, Toby Hall, and Darren Rivett, of the book Mobilisation with Movement: The Art and the Science (Elsevier, 2011).
