= Jan Petrus Hoffman =

South African shot putter

Personal information
- Born: 1 May 1988 (age 38)

Sport
- Country: South Africa
- Sport: Athletics
- Event: Shot put

Achievements and titles
- Personal best: Shot put: 17.83 m (2007)

Jan Petrus Hoffman (born 1 May 1988) is a South African male shot putter who won two individual gold medal at the Youth World Championships.
