= Ali Shahrokhi =

Iranian discus thrower

Personal information
- Born: 11 March 1988 (age 38)

Sport
- Country: Iran
- Sport: Athletics
- Event: Discus throw

Achievements and titles
- Personal best: Discus throw: 41.07 m (2005)

Ali Shahrokhi (born 11 March 1988) is an Iranian male discus thrower, who won an individual gold medal at the Youth World Championships.
