= Cordera Jenkins =

American hurdler

Personal information
- Nationality: United States
- Born: January 17, 1988 (age 38) Dickinson, Texas
- Height: 6 ft 0 in (1.83 m)
- Weight: 180 lb (82 kg)

Sport
- Sport: Running
- Event: 110m hurdles

Achievements and titles
- Personal best: 110 m h: 13.44 (Indianapolis 2006)
Medal record
Men's athletics
Representing the United States
World Youth Championships
Gold medal – first place	2005 Marrakesh	110 m hurdles

Cordera Jenkins (born January 17, 1988) is an American professional 110m hurdler. He was recruited by Coach Vince Anderson for Texas A&M University and Coach Leroy Burrell of University of Houston as an All American hurdler. Cordera Jenkins chose to attend Texas A&M.

A native of Dickinson, Texas, Cordera Jenkins won the Texas HS 4A State 110m Hurdle title in 2005 with a time of 13.63. He is the holder of all but one USATF Gulf Association sprint hurdle records. Jenkins won a gold medal in the 110m hurdles at the 2005 World Youth Championships in Athletics in Marrakesh, Morocco, by defeating Ryan Brathwaite with a time of 13.35. Cordera Jenkins became the seventh U.S. Nike Indoor National hurdle champion in 2006, defeating both Darius Reed and Johnny Dutch and running the fifth fastest Nike Indoor hurdle time ever. In 2006, he tested positive for marijuana following his win at the U.S. Junior Outdoor Track & Field Championships in Indianapolis and accepted a deferred three-month suspension. Along with the suspension, Cordera Jenkins (CJ) was stripped of his win and position on the U.S National Junior Team in the 110-meter hurdles. He is coached and trained by his longtime coach and manager JohnAllen Magee of Houston and currently resides outside of Houston in nearby Texas City..

== See also ==
- List of doping cases in athletics
