= Viktoriya Prokopenko =

Russian triple jumper

Personal information
- Nationality: Russian
- Born: 17 April 1989 (age 37) Saint Petersburg

Sport
- Sport: Athletics
- Event(s): Triple jump, long jump

Achievements and titles
- Personal bests: TJ: 14.44m i (2018); LJ: 6.41m (+2.0) (2012)

Viktoriya Prokopenko (Russian: Виктория Георгиевна Прокопенко, née Dolgacheva; born 17 April 1989) is a Russian triple jumper. She is a two-time national champion in that event, and she finished 7th at the 2018 World Athletics Indoor Championships.

== Biography ==
Prokopenko was born in Saint Petersburg. Her first major international championship was at the 2013 European Athletics Indoor Championships, where she was the first athlete to not qualify for the finals of the triple jump, missing the qualifying mark by two centimetres.

From July 2013 to July 2015, Prokopenko was disqualified from all competitions for doping. She tested positive for the banned metabolite ostarine at the Russian Youth Athletics Championships in June 2013.

After her return to the sport, Prokopenko won her first Russian Athletics Championship individual title in 2016. She would later go on to win an indoor national title in 2018 as well. At the 2018 World Indoor Championships triple jump, Propenko jumped 14.05 metres in the third round, initially placing her tied for 2nd place, but she was surpassed in the following rounds and finished 7th overall.

== Statistics ==
=== Personal bests ===
Event	Mark	Competition	Venue	Date
Long jump	6.41 m (+2.0 m/s)		Yerino, Russia	22 July 2012
Triple jump	14.44 m i	Russian Winter Meeting	Moscow, Russia	3 February 2018
