= Sandor Palhegyi =

Hungarian hammer thrower

Personal information
- Born: 4 November 1988 (age 37)

Sport
- Country: Hungary
- Sport: Athletics
- Event: Hammer throw

Achievements and titles
- Personal best: Hammer throw: 65.22 m (2006)

Sandor Palhegyi (born 4 November 1988) is a Hungarian male hammer thrower, who won an individual gold medal at the Youth World Championships.
