= Track and field at the 2011 Military World Games =

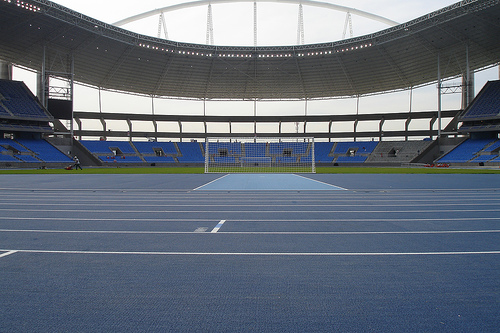
- The track at the host stadium
- Dates: 17–23 July
- Host city: Rio de Janeiro, Brazil
- Venue: Estádio Olímpico João Havelange
- Events: 35

The track and field competition at the 2011 Military World Games was held from 17–23 July 2011 at the Estádio Olímpico João Havelange in Rio de Janeiro. The programme contained 35 athletics events, 20 for men and 15 for women. The marathon races (held in conjunction with the annual Rio de Janeiro Marathon) took place on 17 July while the track and field events were held in the stadium from 19–23 July.

The host nation Brazil topped the medal table with eight gold medals and fourteen in total. Kenya was a close runner-up, with six golds and a total of fifteen medals after strong performances in the middle to long distance running events. Poland, Qatar and Ukraine were other countries which performed well. Twenty-six nations had a medal-winning athlete in the track and field competition.

The marathon competition returned, after a break at the 2007 edition, but the racewalk and decathlon were dropped. Despite the increased number of women's track events, only three field events were contested by female athletes.

Qatar's Femi Ogunode was the only athlete to win two individual events, taking the 100 metres and 200 metres titles in Games records. Ana Cláudia Silva of Brazil won the women's 200 m and the 4×100 metres relay, as well as the 100 m silver, while her compatriot Geisa Coutinho won the 400 m and featured in both of Brazil's winning relay teams. Keila Costa came close to a long jump/triple jump double, but was narrowly beaten by Simona La Mantia in the latter event.

A total of ten Games records were broken during the five-day competition. Chinese Olympic medallist Zhang Wenxiu won the women's hammer throw in a Games record – a feat also achieved by Poland's Paweł Wojciechowski in the men's pole vault. The men's 400 metres was won by Sajjad Hashemi in an Iranian national record time.

== Records ==
Name	Event	Country	Record	Type
Femi Seun Ogunode	Men's 100 metres	Qatar	10.07 s	GR
Femi Seun Ogunode	Men's 200 metres	Qatar	20.46 s	GR
Sajjad Hashemi	Men's 400 metres	Iran	45.81 s	NR
Girmay Hadgu	Men's 800 metres	Eritrea	1:47.20 min	NR
Mark Kiptoo	Men's 5000 metres	Kenya	13:06.17 min	GR
Agus Prayogo	Men's 5000 metres	Indonesia	14:02.12 min	NR
Mutaz Barshim	Men's high jump	Qatar	2.29 m	GR
Paweł Wojciechowski	Men's pole vault	Poland	5.81 m	GR
Ana Cláudia Silva	Women's 400 metres	Brazil	23.01 s	GR
Geisa Coutinho	Women's 400 metres	Brazil	51.08 s	GR
Alina Talay	Women's 100 m hurdles	Belarus	12.95 s	GR
Zhang Wenxiu	Women's hammer throw	China	74.29 s	GR
Geisa Coutinho; Vanda Gomes; Ana Cláudia Silva; Franciela Krasucki	Women's 4 × 100 m relay	Brazil	43.73 s	GR
Key:WR — World record • AR — Area record • GR — Games record • NR — National record

== Medal summary ==
=== Men ===
Event	Gold		Silver		Bronze	
100 metres	Femi Seun Ogunode (QAT)	10.07 GR	Aziz Ouhadi (MAR)	10.17 SB	Nilson André (BRA)	10.34
200 metres	Femi Seun Ogunode (QAT)	20.46 GR	Aziz Ouhadi (MAR)	20.62	Yoel Tapia (DOM)	20.88 SB
400 metres	Sajjad Hashemi (IRI)	45.81 NR	Mark Mutai (KEN)	45.91 SB	Arismendy Peguero (DOM)	45.95 SB
800 metres	Marcin Lewandowski (POL)	1:45.77	Jackson Kivuva (KEN)	1:45.93	Geoffrey Matum (KEN)	1:45.94 SB
1500 metres	Gideon Gathimba (KEN)	3:40.62	Mohamed Moustaoui (MAR)	3:41.04	Imad Touil (ALG)	3:41.24
5000 metres	Mark Kiptoo (KEN)	13:06.17 GR	Vincent Kiprop (KEN)	13:06.31	Bilisuma Gelassa (BHR)	13:06.73
10,000 metres	Josphat Kiprono Menjo (KEN)	28:36.92	Ali Hasan Mahboob (BHR)	28:37.08	Kiplimo Kimutai (KEN)	28:45.27
Marathon	Patrick Tambwe Ngoie (FRA)	2:18:17	Rachid Ghanmouni (FRA)	2:18:43	Paul Kosgei (KEN)	2:20:43
110 metres hurdles	Dominik Bochenek (POL)	13.74	Ji Wei (CHN)	13.81	Mariusz Kubaszewski (POL)	13.87
400 metres hurdles	Raphael Fernandes (BRA)	50.50 SB	Víctor Solarte (VEN)	50.60 SB	Leonardo Capotosti (ITA)	50.86
3000 metres steeplechase	Simon Ayeko (UGA)	8:29.39	Abdelkader Hachlaf (MAR)	8:29.43	Abubaker Ali Kamal (QAT)	8:30.71
High jump	Mutaz Barshim (QAT)	2.29 GR	Yuriy Krymarenko (UKR)	2.23	Dmytro Dem'yanyuk (UKR)	2.20
Pole vault	Paweł Wojciechowski (POL)	5.81 GR	Łukasz Michalski (POL)	5.65	Fábio Gomes da Silva (BRA)	5.60
Long jump	Yu Zhenwei (CHN)	8.05 SB	Zhang Xiaoyi (CHN)	7.90	Víctor Castillo (VEN)	7.81 SB
Triple jump	Jefferson Sabino (BRA)	16.89 SB	Issam Nima (ALG)	16.49	Dzmitry Dziatsuk (BLR)	16.38
Shot put	Andriy Semenov (UKR)	20.02	Candy Arnd Bauer (GER)	19.14	Andrei Siniakou (BLR)	18.10
Discus throw	Mahmoud Samimi (IRI)	61.36	Rashid Al-Dosari (QAT)	61.21	Musab Momani (JOR)	60.97
Javelin throw	Ari Mannio (FIN)	82.48	Spyridon Lempessis (GRE)	76.35	Matija Kranjc (SLO)	74.71
4×100 metres relay	Brazil; Vicente de Lima; Ailson Feitosa; Basílio de Moraes; Nilson André	39.53	Poland; Grzegorz Zimniewicz; Kamil Masztak; Robert Kubaczyk; Marcin Marciniszyn	39.63	Sri Lanka; Shareef Safran; Ranil Jayawaradena; Gihan Chamara; Shehan Ambepitiya	40.02
4×400 metres relay	Poland; Piotr Klimczak; Daniel Dąbrowski; Kacper Kozłowski; Marcin Marciniszyn	3:04.55	Kenya; Kipkemboi Soi; Jonathan Kibet; Geoffrey Matum; Mark Mutai	3:07.87	India; Riju Kallammarukunnal; Premanand Jayakumar; Mortaja Shake; Kunhu Puthenpurakkal	3:08.31

=== Women ===
Event	Gold		Silver		Bronze	
100 metres	Mariya Ryemyen (UKR)	11.34	Ana Cláudia Silva (BRA)	11.37	Olesya Povh (UKR)	11.49
200 metres	Ana Cláudia Silva (BRA)	23.01 GR	Mariya Ryemyen (UKR)	23.27	Olesya Povh (UKR)	23.40
400 metres	Geisa Coutinho (BRA)	51.08 GR	Olga Tereshkova (KAZ)	51.27	Jailma de Lima (BRA)	51.77 SB
800 metres	Maryna Arzamasava (BLR)	2:01.39	Margarita Matsko (KAZ)	2:01.83 SB	Hellen Obiri (KEN)	2:01.86
1500 metres	Nancy Langat (KEN)	4:15.42	Denise Krebs (GER)	4:15.87	Geneb Regasa (BHR)	4:16.31
5000 metres	Shitaye Habtegebrel (BHR)	15:52.84	Tejitu Chalchissa (BHR)	15:54.51	Rebecca Cheptegei (UGA)	16:00.26
10,000 metres	Doris Changeywo (KEN)	33:38.93	Lineth Chepkurui (KEN)	33:39.13	Kareema Saleh Jasim (BHR)	33:45.34
Marathon	Kim Kum-Ok (PRK)	2:35:22	Wei Yanan (CHN)	2:36:19	Helalia Johannes (NAM)	2:37:15
100 metres hurdles	Alina Talay (BLR)	12.95 GR	Veronica Borsi (ITA)	13.08 PB	Ekaterina Poplavskaya (BLR)	13.12 SB
3000 metres steeplechase	Mercy Njoroge (KEN)	9:36.92	Irini Kokkinariou (GRE)	9:39.53 SB	Salima El Ouali Alami (MAR)	9:42.51 PB
Long jump	Keila Costa (BRA)	6.41 SB	Vanessa Seles (BRA)	6.28 SB	Ruslana Tsykhotska (UKR)	6.23
Triple jump	Simona La Mantia (ITA)	14.19	Keila Costa (BRA)	14.11 SB	Ruslana Tsykhotska (UKR)	14.05
Hammer throw	Zhang Wenxiu (CHN)	74.29 GR	Nataliya Zolotukhina (UKR)	67.93	Rosa Rodríguez (VEN)	67.16
4×100 metres relay	Brazil; Geisa Coutinho; Vanda Gomes; Ana Cláudia Silva; Franciela Krasucki	43.73 GR	Poland; Marika Popowicz; Daria Korczyńska; Marta Jeschke; Ewelina Ptak	44.35	Ukraine; Yevgeniya Snihur; Olena Chebanu; Mariya Ryemyen; Olesya Povh	45.00
4×400 metres relay	Brazil; Vanda Gomes; Christiane dos Santos; Geisa Coutinho; Jailma de Lima	3:32.42	Dominican Republic; Raysa Sánchez; Margarita Manzueta; Marleny Mejía; Yolanda Osana	3:38.75	Sri Lanka; Menaka Wickramasinghe; Champika Dilrukshi; Sva Kusumawathi; Chandrika Subashini	3:44.32

=== Medal table ===
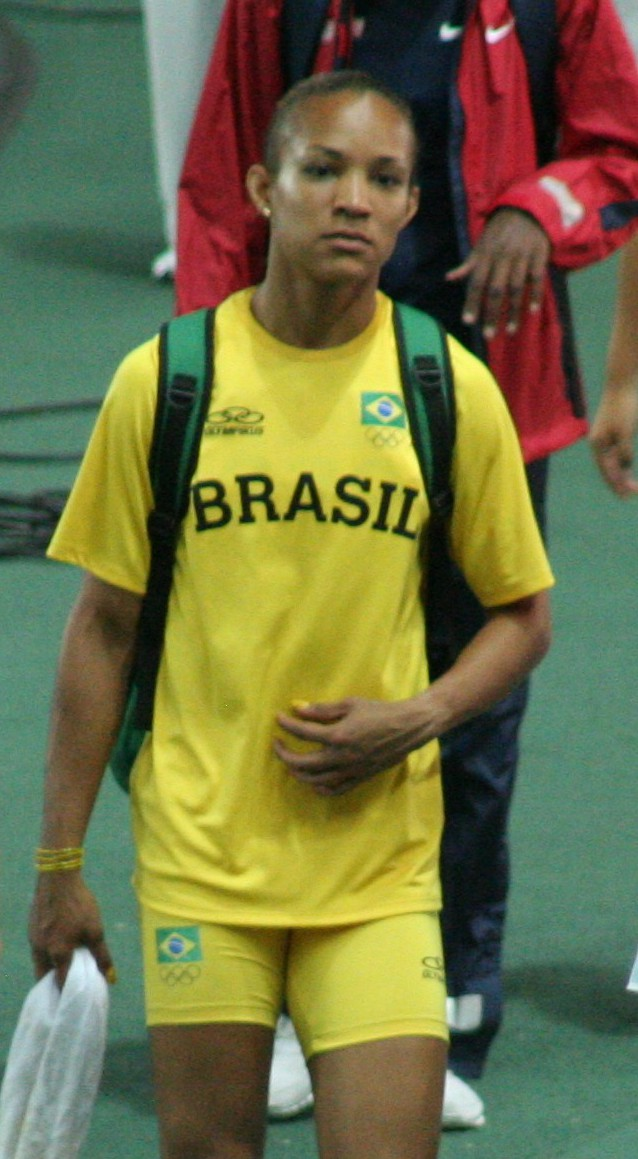
Keila Costa won medals in the long jump and triple jump for Brazil.

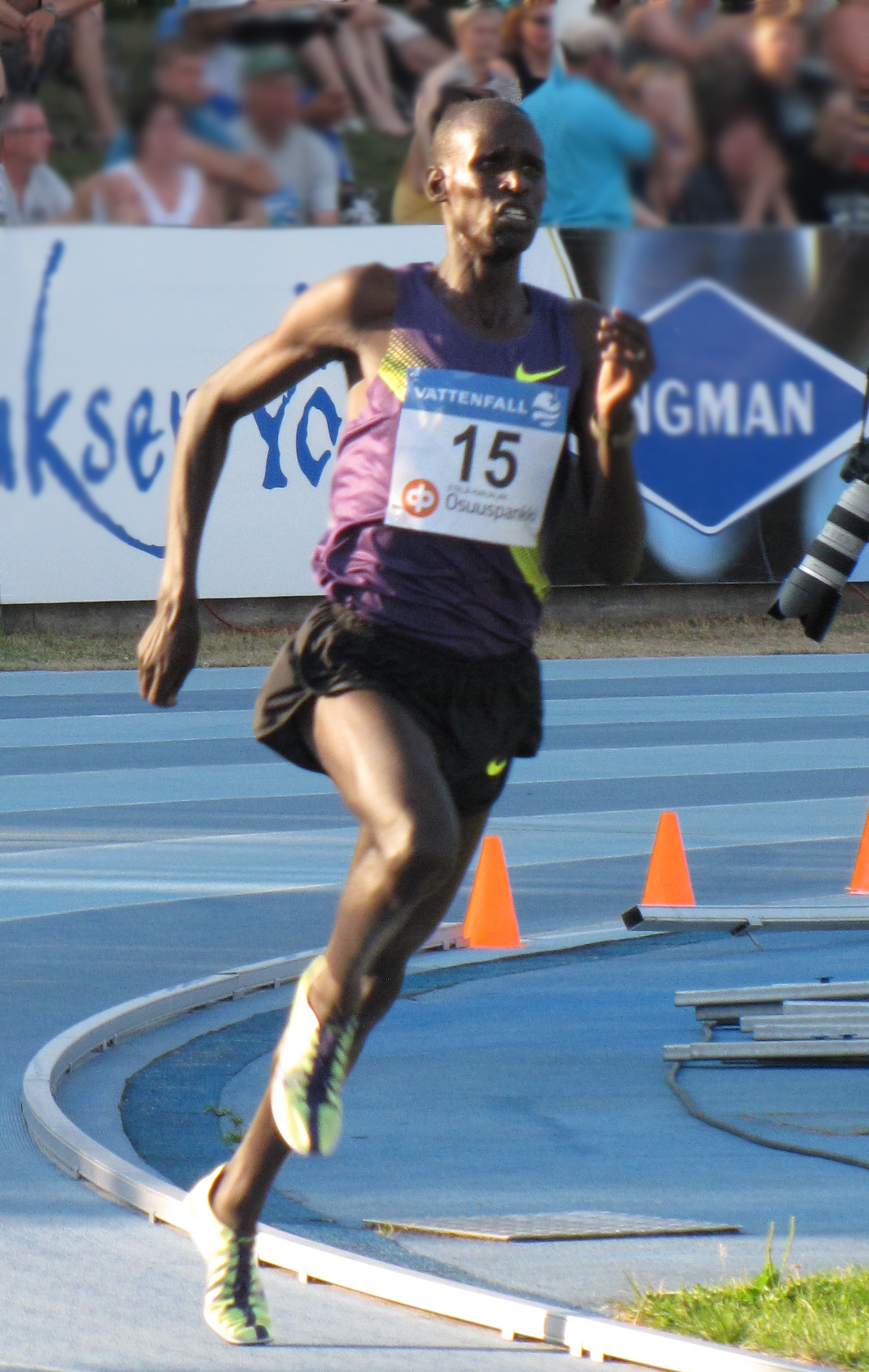
Josphat Kiprono Menjo was one of many Kenyan long-distance medallists.

* Host nation (Brazil)

Rank	Nation	Gold	Silver	Bronze	Total
1	Brazil (BRA)*	8	3	3	14
2	Kenya (KEN)	6	5	4	15
3	Poland (POL)	4	3	1	8
4	Qatar (QAT)	3	1	1	5
5	Ukraine (UKR)	2	3	6	11
6	China (CHN)	2	3	0	5
7	Belarus (BLR)	2	0	3	5
8	Iran (IRI)	2	0	0	2
9	Bahrain (BHR)	1	2	3	6
10	Italy (ITA)	1	1	1	3
11	France (FRA)	1	1	0	2
12	Uganda (UGA)	1	0	1	2
13	Finland (FIN)	1	0	0	1
13	North Korea (PRK)	1	0	0	1
15	Morocco (MAR)	0	4	1	5
16	Germany (GER)	0	2	0	2
16	Greece (GRE)	0	2	0	2
16	Kazakhstan (KAZ)	0	2	0	2
19	Dominican Republic (DOM)	0	1	2	3
19	Venezuela (VEN)	0	1	2	3
21	Algeria (ALG)	0	1	1	2
22	Sri Lanka (SRI)	0	0	2	2
23	India (IND)	0	0	1	1
23	Jordan (JOR)	0	0	1	1
23	Namibia (NAM)	0	0	1	1
23	Slovenia (SLO)	0	0	1	1
Totals (26 entries)		35	35	35	105
