= Liliya Kulyk =

Ukrainian triple jumper

Medal record
Women's athletics
Representing Ukraine
World Junior Championships
Bronze medal – third place	2006 Beijing	Triple jump
European Athletics U23 Championships
Gold medal – first place	2007 Debrecen	Triple jump
Bronze medal – third place	2009 Kaunas	Triple jump
European Junior Championships
Bronze medal – third place	2005 Kaunas	Triple jump

Liliya Kulyk (born 27 January 1987) is a Ukrainian triple jumper.

She won the bronze medal at the 2006 World Junior Championships. This was the first time she broke the 14-metre barrier, with a 14.01 jump. She improved further to 14.39 metres when she won the 2007 European U23 Championships. At the 2009 European U23 Championships she took the bronze medal. She also competed at the 2008 Olympic Games, the 2009 World Championships and the 2010 World Indoor Championships without reaching the final.

Her personal best jump is still 14.39 metres, achieved in July 2007 in Debrecen.
