= Kseniya Dziatsuk =

Belarusian triple jumper

Personal information
- Born: April 23, 1986 (age 40)
- Height: 1.79 m (5 ft 10 1/2 in)
- Weight: 58 kg (128 lb)

Sport
- Country: Belarus
- Sport: Athletics
- Event: Triple jump
- Updated on 15 August 2012

Kseniya Dziatsuk (Belarusian: Ксенія Дзяцук; born 23 April 1986 in Homiel) is a Belarusian triple jumper.

She competed at the 2008 Olympic Games without reaching the final and the 2012 Summer Olympics.

Her personal best jump is 14.76 metres, achieved in May 2012 in Brest.
