= Lesotho at the 2018 Commonwealth Games =

- Flag of Lesotho
- CG code: LES
- CGA: Lesotho National Olympic Committee
- Website: lnoc.tripod.com

in Gold Coast, Australia 4 April 2018 – 15 April 2018
- Competitors: 20 in 4 sports
- Medals: Gold 0 Silver 0 Bronze 0 Total 0

Commonwealth Games appearances (overview)
- 1974; 1978; 1982; 1986; 1990; 1994; 1998; 2002; 2006; 2010; 2014; 2018; 2022; 2026; 2030

Lesotho competed at the 2018 Commonwealth Games in the Gold Coast, Australia from April 4 to April 15, 2018.

== Competitors ==
The following is the list of number of competitors participating at the Games per sport/discipline.

Sport	Men	Women	Total
Athletics	4	5	9
Boxing	5	1	6
Cycling	3	1	4
Weightlifting	1	0	1
Total	13	7	20

== Athletics ==
Men
Track & road events

Athlete	Event	Heat		Semifinal		Final	
Athlete	Event	Result	Rank	Result	Rank	Result	Rank
Mosito Lehata	100 m	10.50	2 Q	DNF		Did not advance	
Mosito Lehata	200 m	DNS		Did not advance			
Toka Badboy	5000 m	—N/a				DSQ	
Toka Badboy	10000 m	—N/a				31:22.38	13
Tsepo Mathibelle	Marathon	—N/a				DNF	
Ramolefi Motsieloa	Marathon	—N/a				2:30:16	13

Women
Track & road events

Athlete	Event	Heat		Final	
Athlete	Event	Result	Rank	Result	Rank
Tsepang Sello	800 m	2:06.54	8	Did not advance	
Mokulubete Malatisi	1500 m	4:41.19	10	Did not advance	
Lineo Chaka	5000 m	—N/a		18:35.38	18
Mokulubete Malatisi	5000 m	—N/a		17:35.72	17
Lineo Chaka	10000 m	—N/a		36:55.77	19
Neheng Khatala	Marathon	—N/a		2:51:04	13

Field events

Athlete	Event	Final	
Athlete	Event	Distance	Rank
Lerato Sechele	Triple jump	13.57	4

== Boxing ==
Lesotho participated with a team of 6 athletes (5 men and 1 woman)

Men

Athlete	Event	Round of 32	Round of 16	Quarterfinals	Semifinals	Final	Rank
Athlete	Event	Opposition Result	Opposition Result	Opposition Result	Opposition Result	Opposition Result	Rank
Thabo Molefe	−52 kg	—N/a	Kalai (VAN); W 5 - 0	Bandara (SRI); L 1 - 4	Did not advance		
Moroke Mokhotho	−56 kg	—N/a	Vadamootoo (MRI); W 3 - 2	Walker (NIR); L 1 - 4	Did not advance		
Qhobosheane Mohlerepe	−60 kg	Bye	McDonagh (WAL); L 0 - 5	Did not advance			
Mokhachane Moshoeshoe	−69 kg	Bye	Hindley (NZL); L 1 - 4	Did not advance			
Kokole Paneng	−75 kg	Tyrell (SAM); L RSC	Did not advance				

Women

Athlete	Event	Round of 16	Quarterfinals	Semifinals	Final	Rank
Athlete	Event	Opposition Result	Opposition Result	Opposition Result	Opposition Result	Rank
Mantoa Ranone	−57 kg	Alexis Pritchard (NZL); L RSC	Did not advance			

== Cycling ==
Lesotho participated with 4 athletes (3 men and 1 woman).

=== Road ===
Athlete	Event	Time	Rank
Malefetsane Lesofe	Men's road race	DNF	

=== Mountain bike ===
Athlete	Event	Time	Rank
Tumelo Makae	Men's cross-country	-2LAP	19
Phetetso Monese	Men's cross-country	-2LAP	18
Likeleli Masitise	Women's cross-country	-4LAP	12

== Weightlifting ==
Lesotho competed in weightlifting.

Athlete	Event	Snatch		Clean & jerk		Total	Rank
Athlete	Event	Result	Rank	Result	Rank	Total	Rank
Bafokeng Moeti	Men's −69 kg	95	14	115	11	210	11

== See also ==
- Lesotho at the 2018 Summer Youth Olympics
