= Lesotho at the 2022 Commonwealth Games =

- Flag of Lesotho
- CG code: LES
- CGA: Lesotho National Olympic Committee
- Website: lnoc.org.ls

in Birmingham, England 28 July 2022 – 8 August 2022
- Competitors: 21 (15 men and 6 women) in 4 sports
- Flag bearers (opening): Lerato Sechele; Tumelo Makae
- Flag bearer (closing): Moroke Mokhotho
- Medals: Gold 0 Silver 0 Bronze 0 Total 0

Commonwealth Games appearances (overview)
- 1974; 1978; 1982; 1986; 1990; 1994; 1998; 2002; 2006; 2010; 2014; 2018; 2022; 2026; 2030

Lesotho competed at the 2022 Commonwealth Games in Birmingham, England from 28 July to 8 August 2022. This was Lesotho's 12th appearance at the Commonwealth Games.

Lesotho's team consisted of 21 athletes (15 men and six women) competing in four sports. Lerato Sechele and Tumelo Makae were the country's flagbearers during the opening ceremony, while Moroke Mokhotho was the closing ceremony flagbearer.

== Competitors ==
The Lesotho team consisted of 21 athletes.

The following is the list of number of competitors that participated at the Games per sport/discipline.

Sport	Men	Women	Total
Athletics	5	6	11
Boxing	5	0	5
Cycling	4	0	4
Weightlifting	1	0	1
Total	15	6	21

== Athletics ==
Men
Track and road events

Athlete	Event	Heat		Semifinal		Final	
Athlete	Event	Result	Rank	Result	Rank	Result	Rank
Mojela Koneshe	100 m	10.46	4	did not advance			
Tebello Ramakongoana	5000 m	—N/a				14:54.62	17
Tsepo Mathibelle	Marathon	—N/a				2:38:52	17
Motlokoa Nkhabutlane	Marathon	—N/a				did not finish	
Lebenya Nkoka	Marathon	—N/a				2:32:52	15

Women
Track and road events

Athlete	Event	Heat		Final	
Athlete	Event	Result	Rank	Result	Rank
Manqabang Tsibela	800 m	2:13.34	6	did not advance	
Manqabang Tsibela	1500 m	4:40.01	7	did not advance	
Mathakane Letsie	5000 m	—N/a		17:25.32	21
Neheng Khatala	10,000 m	—N/a		33:27.35	12
Mathakane Letsie	10,000 m	—N/a		36:50.62	13
Mokulubete Makatisi	Marathon	—N/a		2:36:05	8

Field events

Athlete	Event	Final	
Athlete	Event	Distance	Rank
Lerato Sechele	Triple jump	12.57	12
Litsitso Khotlele	Discus throw F44/64	24.07	9

== Boxing ==
Men

Athlete	Event	Round of 32	Round of 16	Quarterfinals	Semifinals	Final	
Athlete	Event	Opposition Result	Opposition Result	Opposition Result	Opposition Result	Opposition Result	Rank
Retselisitsoe Kolobe	Flyweight	—N/a	Dodd (WAL); L RSC	did not advance			
Phomolo Lengola	Bantamweight	—N/a	H-Allan (WAL); L 1 - 4	did not advance			
Moroke Mokhotho	Featherweight	Hussain (PAK); L RSC	did not advance				
Qhobosheane Mohlerepe	Light welterweight	Atmatzidis (CYP); W 5 - 0	Sanford (CAN); L 0 - 5	did not advance			
Arena Pakela	Light middleweight	Ssenyange (UGA); W 4 - 1	Walsh (NIR); L 0 - 5	did not advance			

== Cycling ==
=== Road ===
Men

Athlete	Event	Time	Rank
Teboho Khantsi	Road race	DNF	
Kabelo Makatile	Road race	DNF	

=== Mountain Biking ===
Athlete	Event	Time	Rank
Tumelo Makae	Men’s cross-country	LAP	
Phetetso Monese	Men’s cross-country	LAP	

== Weightlifting ==
Athlete	Event	Weight Lifted		Total	Rank
Athlete	Event	Snatch	Clean & jerk	Total	Rank
Nkhahle Sebota	Men's -61 kg	80	106	186	8
