= Lesotho at the Commonwealth Games =

- CG code: LES
- CGA: Lesotho National Olympic Committee
- Website: lnoc.org.ls
- Medals Ranked 45th: Gold 1 Silver 1 Bronze 3 Total 5

Commonwealth Games appearances (overview)
- 1974; 1978; 1982; 1986; 1990; 1994; 1998; 2002; 2006; 2010; 2014; 2018; 2022; 2026; 2030

Lesotho have competed in eleven Commonwealth Games, beginning in 1974 and missing only the 1982 Games. Their first medal was a gold medal in the men's marathon, won by Thabiso Moqhali in 1998.

== Medals ==
Games	Gold	Silver	Bronze	Total
1974 Christchurch	0	0	0	0
1978 Edmonton	0	0	0	0
1982 Brisbane	did not attend			
1986 Edinburgh	0	0	0	0
1990 Auckland	0	0	0	0
1994 Victoria	0	0	0	0
1998 Kuala Lumpur	1	0	0	1
2002 Manchester	0	0	1	1
2006 Melbourne	0	1	0	1
2010 Delhi	0	0	0	0
2014 Glasgow	0	0	0	0
2018 Gold Coast	0	0	0	0
2022 Birmingam	0	0	0	0
2026 Glasgow	0	0	2	2
Total	1	1	3	5

== Medalists ==
Medal	Year	Name	Sport	Event	Refs
Gold	1998	Thabiso Moqhali	Athletics	Men's marathon	
Silver	2006	Moses Kopo	Boxing	Men's 64kg	
Bronze	2002	Ezekiel Letuka	Boxing	Men's 54kg	
Bronze	2026	Pooana Khoahli	Boxing	Men's 65 kg	
Bronze	2026	Rapelang Maselela	Boxing	Women's 57 kg	
