= Lesotho at the 2014 Commonwealth Games =

- CG code: LES
- CGA: Lesotho National Olympic Committee
- Website: lnoc.tripod.com

in Glasgow, Scotland
- Competitors: 27 in 6 sports
- Flag bearer: Mokhotho Moroke
- Medals: Gold 0 Silver 0 Bronze 0 Total 0

Commonwealth Games appearances (overview)
- 1974; 1978; 1982; 1986; 1990; 1994; 1998; 2002; 2006; 2010; 2014; 2018; 2022; 2026; 2030

Lesotho competed in the 2014 Commonwealth Games in Glasgow, Scotland from 23 July – 3 August 2014.

== Athletics ==
Men
Track & road events

Athlete	Event	Heat		Semifinal		Final	
Athlete	Event	Result	Rank	Result	Rank	Result	Rank
Mosito Lehata	200 m	20.68 Q	7	20.54 Q	=7	20.36 NR	4
Kabelo Lesia	5000 m	—N/a				15:08.91	23
Mothimokholo Hatasi	5000 m	—N/a				14:44.93	21
Mothimokholo Hatasi	10000 m	—N/a				30:03.17 PB	23
Thabo Ntlaloe	5000 m	—N/a				14:47.01	22
Thabo Ntlaloe	10000 m	—N/a				29:15.91	21
Rethabile Molefi	10000 m	—N/a				30:48.36	24
Ramolefi Motsieloa	Marathon	—N/a				2:17:12	15
Tsepo Ramonene	Marathon	—N/a				2:16:21	12

Women
Track & road events

Athlete	Event	Final	
Athlete	Event	Result	Rank
Moleboheng Mafata	Marathon	2:52:30	17
Ntahleng Masaile	Marathon	2:51:30	16

Field events

Athlete	Event	Qualification		Final	
Athlete	Event	Distance	Position	Distance	Position
Lerato Schele	Long jump	DNS		did not advance	
Lerato Schele	Triple jump	12.33	16	did not advance	
Selloane Tsoaeli	Triple jump	12.53	15	did not advance	
Selloane Tsoaeli	High jump	DNS		did not advance	

Key

- Note–Ranks given for track events are within the athlete's heat only
- Q = Qualified for the next round
- q = Qualified for the next round as a fastest loser or, in field events, by position without achieving the qualifying target
- NR = National record
- N/A = Round not applicable for the event

== Boxing ==
Men

Athlete	Event	Round of 32	Round of 16	Quarterfinals	Semifinals	Final	
Athlete	Event	Opposition Result	Opposition Result	Opposition Result	Opposition Result	Opposition Result	Rank
Inkululeko Suntele	Light flyweight	Redzuan (MAS); L 0 - 3	did not advance				
Moroke Mokhotho	Flyweight	Bye	Nzioki (KEN); W w/o	Waseem (PAK); L 0 - 3	did not advance		
Neo Thamahane	Bantamweight	Bye	Ashfaq (ENG); L 0 - 3	did not advance			
Qhobosheane Mohlerepe	Lightweight	Saparamadu (SRI); W 3 - 0	FitzPatrick (NIR); L 1 - 2	did not advance			
Mokhachane Moshoeshoe	Light welterweight	Kumar (IND); L 0 - 3	did not advance				
Kokole Paneng	Welterweight	Tswiige (BOT); L 0 - 3	did not advance				
Lungile Dyamdeki	Middleweight	Coyle (NIR); L 0 - 3	did not advance				

Women

Athlete	Event	Round of 16	Quarterfinals	Semifinals	Final	Rank
Athlete	Event	Opposition Result	Opposition Result	Opposition Result	Opposition Result	Rank
Nthabeleng Mathaha	Lightweight	Machongua (MOZ); L 0 - 3	did not advance			
Keabetsoe Mothibeli	Middleweight	Weerarathna (SRI); L TKO	did not advance			

== Cycling ==
=== Mountain biking ===
Athlete	Event	Time	Rank
Teboho Khantsi	Men's cross-country	LAP	
Phetetso Monese	Men's cross-country	LAP	

=== Road ===
Men

Athlete	Event	Time	Rank
Teboho Khantsi	Road race	DNF	
Phetetso Monese	Road race	DNF	

== Squash ==
Individual

Athlete	Event	Round of 128	Round of 64	Round of 32	Round of 16	Quarterfinals	Semifinals	Final	Rank
Athlete	Event	Opposition Score	Opposition Score	Opposition Score	Opposition Score	Opposition Score	Opposition Score	Opposition Score	Rank
Ntholeng Lechesa	Men's Singles	Bye	C Binnie (JAM); L 0-3	did not advance					

== Swimming ==
Men

Athlete	Event	Heat		Final	
Athlete	Event	Time	Rank	Time	Rank
Ntseke Setho	200 m breaststroke	3:05.18	21	did not advance	

== Table Tennis ==
Singles

Athlete	Event	Group Stage			Round of 64	Round of 32	Round of 16	Quarterfinals	Semifinals	Final	Rank
Athlete	Event	Opposition Result	Opposition Result	Rank	Opposition Result	Opposition Result	Opposition Result	Opposition Result	Opposition Result	Opposition Result	Rank
Khethang Mothibi	Men's Singles	McCreery (NIR); L 0 - 4	Tun (BIZ); W 4 - 0	2	did not advance						
Nthabeleng Mokeki	Women's Singles	Whitaker (SCO); L 0 - 4	Morgan (GUE); L 0 - 4	3	did not advance						

Doubles

Athlete	Event	Round of 128	Round of 64	Round of 32	Round of 16	Quarterfinals	Semifinals	Final	Rank
Athlete	Event	Opposition Result	Opposition Result	Opposition Result	Opposition Result	Opposition Result	Opposition Result	Opposition Result	Rank
Nthabeleng Mokeki; Khethang Mothibi	Mixed Doubles	Kenya; L 0 - 3	did not advance						
