= List of Ivorian records in athletics =

The following are the national records in athletics in Ivory Coast maintained by its national athletics federation, the Fédération Ivoirienne d'Athlétisme (FIA).

== Outdoor ==
Key: Awaiting ratification Record not kept by the FIA Not ratified or later rescinded by the FIA

=== Men ===
Event	Record	Athlete	Date	Meet	Place	Ref.
100 m	9.93 (+1.9 m/s)	Arthur Cissé	24 July 2019	Bayer Classics	Leverkusen, Germany	
100 m	9.91 A (+0.1 m/s) (Note: All time results during the first three days of competition have been cancelled because of wrong chronometre.)	Arthur Cissé	9 August 2022	Islamic Solidarity Games	Konya, Turkey	
100 m	9.89 A (+1.7 m/s) (Note: All time results during the first three days of competition have been cancelled because of wrong chronometre.)	Arthur Cissé	9 August 2022	Islamic Solidarity Games	Konya, Turkey	
150 m	15.15 (+0.5 m/s)	Arthur Cissé	8 September 2020	Golden Spike Ostrava	Ostrava, Czech Republic	
200 m	19.93 (−0.1 m/s)	Cheickna Traore	23 May 2024	NCAA Division I East First Round	Lexington, United States	
300 m	31.74	Gabriel Tiacoh	6 August 1986		A Coruña, Spain	
400 m	44.30	Gabriel Tiacoh	7 June 1986		Indianapolis, United States	
800 m	1:47.09	Siahka Bamba	6 August 2003		Castres, France	
1500 m	3:39.60	Siahka Bamba	23 August 2001		Nantes, France	
3000 m	8:31.08	Alain Kra Kouadio	8 April 1994		Bouaké, Ivory Coast	
5000 m	14:28.6	Pierre Kouabénan	23 April 1988		Abidjan, Ivory Coast	
5 km (road)	15:16+	Jonathan Atse Herrera	27 October 2024	Valencia Half Marathon	Valencia, Spain	
10,000 m	30:17.64	Jonathan Atse Herrera	29 August 2020	French 10000m Championships	Pacé, France	
10 km (road)	30:29	Jonathan Atse Herrera	5 January 2020		Nice, France	
15 km (road)	46:33+	Jonathan Atse Herrera	27 October 2024	Valencia Half Marathon	Valencia, Spain	
20 km (road)	1:01:58	Jonathan Atse Herrera	12 October 2025	Vredestein 20 km de Paris	Paris, France	
Half marathon	1:05:26	Jonathan Atse Herrera	22 October 2023	Valencia Half Marathon	Valencia, Spain	
25 km (road)	1:21:00+	Jonathan Atse Herrera	3 December 2023	Valencia Marathon	Valencia, Spain	
30 km (road)	1:37:22+	Jonathan Atse Herrera	3 December 2023	Valencia Marathon	Valencia, Spain	
Marathon	2:19:21	Jonathan Atse Herrera	3 December 2023	Valencia Marathon	Valencia, Spain	
Marathon	2:18:32 (Note: downhill (drop of 654m))	Bassirima Soro	3 December 2000		Tucson, United States	
110 m hurdles	13.86 (+1.7 m/s)	Marcelin Dally	8 July 1992		Argentan, France	
400 m hurdles	48.94	René Djédjémel Mélédjé	13 August 1986	Weltklasse Zürich	Zürich, Switzerland	
3000 m steeplechase	9:29.6 h	Lassina Konaté	8 April 1972		Abidjan, Ivory Coast	
High jump	2.08 m	Moustapha N'Dir	28 May 1970		Dakar, Senegal	
High jump	2.08 m	Kouami N’Dri	5 May 1979		Abidjan, Ivory Coast	
Pole vault	5.10 m	Alain Andji	21 June 1992		Yerres, France	
Long jump	7.74 m	Brou Kouakou	3 July 1976		Viry-Châtillon, France	
Triple jump	15.78 m	Patrice Bohoury	16 April 1981		Yamoussoukro, Ivory Coast	
Shot put	17.89 m	Martin Mélagne	9 August 1987	All-Africa Games	Nairobi, Kenya	
Discus throw	58.16 m	Denis Ségui Kragbé	25 September 1968		Barcelona, Spain	
Hammer throw	41.88 m	Tiékité Somet	25 March 1972		Abidjan, Ivory Coast	
Javelin throw	71.56 m	Leonard Koffi Kouadio	14 July 1987		Tours, France	
Decathlon	7028 pts	Yves N'Dabian	9–10 June 2001		Arles, France	
Decathlon	100m / Long jump / Shot put / High jump / 400m / 110m H / Discus / Pole vault / Javelin / 1500m; 10.80 / 7.04 m / 10.34 m / 1.87 m / 49.32 / 15.00 / 31.49 m / 4.45 m / 42.92 m / 4:39.21					
20 km walk (road)						
50 km walk (road)						
4 × 100 m relay	38.60	Ivory Coast; Jean-Marie Irie; Ahmed Douhou; Yves Sonan; Eric Pacome N'Dri	12 August 2001	World Championships	Edmonton, Canada	
4 × 200 m relay	1:25.2 h	A. Meite; P. Oure; B. Oulasse; Georges Kablan Degnan	18 June 1977		Bourges, France	
4 × 400 m relay	3:03.50	Ivory Coast; Georges Kablan Degnan; Avognan Nogboum; René Djédjémel Mélédjé; Gabriel Tiacoh	10 August 1984	Olympic Games	Los Angeles, United States	

=== Women ===
Event	Record	Athlete	Date	Meet	Place	Ref.
100 m	10.72 (+0.4 m/s)	Marie Josée Ta Lou	10 August 2022	Herculis	Fontvieille, Monaco	
150 m (straight)	16.60 (+1.6 m/s)	Marie Josée Ta Lou	18 May 2018	Great CityGames Manchester	Manchester, United Kingdom	
150 m (bend)	16.99 (+0.6 m/s)	Marie Josée Ta Lou	8 September 2020	Golden Spike Ostrava	Ostrava, Czech Republic	
200 m	22.08 (+0.8 m/s)	Marie-Josée Ta Lou	11 August 2017	World Championships	London, United Kingdom	
400 m	52.04	Célestine N'Drin	24 September 1988	Olympic Games	Seoul, South Korea	
800 m	2:02.99	Célestine N'Drin	31 May 1990		Durham, United States	
1500 m	4:38.3 h	Caroline Aba	17 May 1991		Kumasi, Ghana	
3000 m	10:09.1	Caroline Aba	24 May 1989		Bouaké, Ivory Coast	
5000 m	17:51.8	Maférima Traoré	3 June 1995		Bouaké, Ivory Coast	
10,000 m	38:27.14	Maférima Traoré	22 July 1995		Bouaké, Ivory Coast	
Marathon						
100 m hurdles	13.14 (+1.4 m/s)	Rosvitha Okou	12 July 2014		Reims, France	
100 m hurdles	13.13 (+0.1 m/s) (Note: as a French citizen)	Rosvitha Okou	10 August 2011		La Roche-sur-Yon, France	
400 m hurdles	56.39	Marie Womplou	12 July 1994	Jeux de la Francophonie	Bondoufle, France	
3000 m steeplechase						
High jump	1.95 m	Lucienne N'Da	28 June 1992		Belle Vue Maurel, Mauritius	
Pole vault	3.80 m	Alima Ouattara	9 July 2014		Aulnay-sous-Bois, France	
Long jump	6.38 m (+2.0 m/s)	Patricia Soman	26 April 2003		Des Moines, United States	
Triple jump	13.03 m (+1.5 m/s)	Eleonore Bailly	26 June 2016	African Championships	Durban, South Africa	
Shot put	14.74 m	Angeline Gbahy	12 July 1998		Évreux, France	
Discus throw	57.98 m	Kazai Suzanne Kragbé	15 July 2010		Kyiv, Ukraine	
Hammer throw	52.85 m	Andrea Vahoua	18 March 2016	Wake Forest Open	Winston-Salem, United States	
Javelin throw	48.38 m	Gabriela Kouassi	22 May 2011	Championnats Nationaux Interclubs Elite Finale	Bondoufle, France	
Heptathlon	5766 pts	Gabriella Kouassi	13–14 April 2012	African Combined Events Championships	Bambous, Mauritius	
Heptathlon	100m H / High jump / Shot put / 200m / Long jump / Javelin / 800m; 13.96 (+1.8 m/s) / 1.68 m / 13.45 m / 25.77 (−0.5 m/s) / 5.83 m (+1.7 m/s) / 47.57 m / 2:24.25					
20 km walk (road)						
4 × 100 m relay	41.90	Ivory Coast; Murielle Ahouré-Demps; Marie-Josée Ta Lou; Jessika Gbai; Maboundou Koné	25 August 2023	World Championships	Budapest, Hungary	
4 × 400 m relay	3:37.58	Ivory Coast; Alimata Koné; L. Kore; Marie Womplou; Célestine N'Drin	18 July 1989	Jeux de la Francophonie	Casablanca, Morocco	

== Indoor ==
=== Men ===
Event	Record	Athlete	Date	Meet	Place	Ref.
60 m	6.53	Arthur Cissé	1 February 2019	ISTAF Indoor	Berlin, Germany	
60 m	6.53	Arthur Cissé	5 February 2021	ISTAF Indoor	Berlin, Germany	
60 m	6.53	Arthur Cissé	12 February 2022	Meeting Metz Moselle Athlelor	Metz, France	
200 m	20.30	Cheickna Traore	9 March 2024	NCAA Division I Championships	Boston, United States	
400 m	46.50	Cheickna Traore	13 January 2024	Nittany Lion Challenge	State College, United States	
400 m	46.15 OT	1 February 1986		Moscow, United States		
800 m	1:49.40	Siahka Bamba	16 February 2001		Liévin, France	
1500 m	3:51.08	Siahka Bamba	7 February 2004		Eaubonne, France	
3000 m	8:38.82	Jonathan Atse Herrera	30 January 2021		Vittel, France	
60 m hurdles	7.98	Marcellin Dally	12 February 1994		Nogent-sur-Oise, France	
High jump	2.06 m	Francois Aboua	17 January 1999		Vittel, France	
Pole vault	4.80 m	Alain Andji	16 February 1992		Bordeaux, France	
Long jump	7.55 m	Leslie Djhone	20 December 1997		Eaubonne, France	
Triple jump	15.00 m	Patrick Kopoin	4 January 1987		Paris, France	
Shot put	14.24 m	Serge Doh	12 January 1995		Liévin, France	
Heptathlon	5381 pts	Yves N'Dabian	9–10 February 2001		Eaubonne, France	
Heptathlon	60m / Long jump / Shot put / High jump / 60m H / Pole vault / 1000m; 6.93 / 6.92 m / 10.07 m / 1.89 m / 8.55 / 4.60 m / 2:42.53					
5000 m walk	26:34.0	Siriki Diarrassouba	15 December 2002		Paris, France	
4 × 400 m relay						

=== Women ===
Event	Record	Athlete	Date	Meet	Place	Ref.
60 m	6.97	Murielle Ahouré	2 March 2018	World Championships	Birmingham, United Kingdom	
200 m	22.80	Murielle Ahouré	13 March 2009	NCAA Division I Championships	College Station, United States	
400 m	54.08	Louise Ayétotché	6 March 1999		Indianapolis, United States	
800 m	2:07.96	Célestine NʼDrin	6 March 1987	World Championships	Indianapolis, United States	
1500 m						
3000 m						
60 m hurdles	8.17	Rosvitha Okou	1 February 2014	Meeting National	Mondeville, France	
High jump	1.95 m	Lucienne N'Da	1992	African Championships	Belle Vue Maurel, Mauritius	
Pole vault	3.65 m	Alima Ouattara	25 February 2011		Aulnay-sous-Bois, France	
Long jump	6.44 m (Note: outdoor mark ratified as absolute record)	Patricia Soman	21 February 2003		Muncie, United States	
Triple jump	13.20 m	Patricia Soman	15 March 2003	NCAA Division I Championships	Fayetteville, United States	
Shot put	13.78 m	Gabriella Kouassi	8 January 2011		Paris, France	
Weight throw	17.61 m	Andrea Vahoua	29 January 2016	Camel City Invitational	Winston-Salem, United States	
Pentathlon	4073 pts	Gabriella Kouassi	8 January 2011	Départementaux Epr. Combinées du 75,77,93,94,91	Paris, France	
Pentathlon	60m H / High jump / Shot put / Long jump / 800m; 8.86 / 1.69 m / 13.78 m / 5.61 m / 2:23.20					
3000 m walk						
4 × 400 m relay						
