= Athletics at the 2015 African Games – Women's long jump =

The women's long jump event at the 2015 African Games was held on 16 September.

== Results ==
| Rank | Name | Nationality | #1 | #2 | #3 | #4 | #5 | #6 | Result | Notes |
|---|---|---|---|---|---|---|---|---|---|---|
| ~~1~~ | Chinazom Amadi | Nigeria | ~~6.24~~ | ~~6.24~~ | ~~6.26~~ | ~~6.31~~ | ~~6.09~~ | ~~6.31~~ | ~~6.31~~ | DQ (doping) |
| 1st place, gold medalist(s) | Joëlle Mbumi Nkouindjin | Cameroon | 5.79 | 5.89 | 6.16 | 6.31 | 6.12 | x | 6.31 | |
| 2nd place, silver medalist(s) | Roumeissa Belabiod | Algeria | 6.30 | x | x | 6.07 | 6.18 | 5.94 | 6.30 | |
| 3rd place, bronze medalist(s) | Lissa Labiche | Seychelles | x | x | 6.01 | 6.13 | 6.18 | 6.25 | 6.25 | SB |
| 4 | Eze Brume | Nigeria | 6.23 | 5.94 | 6.07 | 6.12 | 6.21 | 5.99 | 6.23 | |
| 5 | Lynique Prinsloo | South Africa | x | 6.09 | x | 6.13 | 6.12 | x | 6.13 | |
| 6 | Marlyne Ngo Ngoa | Cameroon | 6.06 | 6.11 | 5.91 | 5.95 | 6.00 | 5.96 | 6.11 | |
| 7 | Zinzi Chabangu | South Africa | 5.65 | x | 5.96 | x | 5.52 | 6.08 | 6.08 | |
| 8 | Lucienne Mbelu | Republic of the Congo | 5.85 | x | 5.73 | | | | 5.85 | |
| 9 | Ibrahim Blessing | Nigeria | 5.84 | 5.70 | 5.57 | | | | 5.84 | |
| 10 | Sokhna Safietou Kante | Senegal | 5.55 | x | 5.46 | | | | 5.55 | |
| 11 | Fatou Mpangi | DR Congo | x | 5.38 | x | | | | 5.38 | |
| 12 | Nyebolo Uguda | Ethiopia | 5.21 | x | 5.24 | | | | 5.24 | |
| | Elizabeth Dadzie | Ghana | | | | | | | DNS | |
| | Caroline Waiganjo | Kenya | | | | | | | DNS | |
| | Leruto Sechele | Lesotho | | | | | | | DNS | |
