= Lesotho at the 1978 Commonwealth Games =

- CGF code: LES
- CGA: Lesotho National Olympic Committee
- Website: lnoc.tripod.com

in Edmonton, Alberta, Canada
- Competitors: 8 in 1 sport
- Medals: Gold 0 Silver 0 Bronze 0 Total 0

Commonwealth Games appearances (overview)
- 1974; 1978; 1982; 1986; 1990; 1994; 1998; 2002; 2006; 2010; 2014; 2018; 2022; 2026; 2030

Lesotho competed in the 1978 Commonwealth Games in Edmonton, Alberta, Canada from August 3 to August 12, 1978. Their team consisted of eight athletes competing in track events.

Men

== Athletics ==
Men

Track & road events

Athlete	Event	Heat		Semifinal		Final	
Athlete	Event	Result	Rank	Result	Rank	Result	Rank
Mohari Molapi Bambatha	100 m	11.27	6	did not advance			
Letseka Nchee	100 m	11.46	7	did not advance			
Letseka Nchee	200 m	22.17	6	did not advance			
Mohari Molapi Bambatha	200 m	22.80	8	did not advance			
Molapo Mopeli	1500 m	4:00.27	–	did not advance			
Mohapi Mphafi	5000 m	15:25.55	10	did not advance			
Gabashane Vincent Rakabele	10,000 m	—N/a				32:08.43	16
Motlalepula Thabana	10,000 m	—N/a				35:32.24	19
Kenneth Hlasa	marathon	—N/a				2-52:35	26
Frances Moholomanyane	marathon	—N/a				2-52:58	27
