= Lesotho at the 2026 Commonwealth Games =

- Flag of Lesotho
- CG code: LES
- CGA: Lesotho National Olympic Committee
- Website: lnoc.org.ls

in Glasgow, Scotland 23 July 2026 – 2 August 2026
- Competitors: 14 in 2 sports
- Flag bearer: Rapelang Maselela
- Baton bearer: Mathealira Seholohohlo
- Medals Ranked =33rd: Gold 0 Silver 0 Bronze 2 Total 2

Commonwealth Games appearances (overview)
- 1974; 1978; 1982; 1986; 1990; 1994; 1998; 2002; 2006; 2010; 2014; 2018; 2022; 2026; 2030

Lesotho competed at the 2026 Commonwealth Games in Glasgow, Scotland. This marked Lesotho's 13th participation at the games, after making its debut at the 1974 Commonwealth Games.

Lesotho team consisted of 14 athletes (eight men and six women), competing in two sports. The team was officially named in May 2026.

The King's Baton relay stopped in Lesotho in October 2025. Mamots’abi Lekhabunyane served as the country's chef de mission.

Boxer Rapelang Maselela was the country's flagbearer during the opening ceremony. Meanwhile, fellow boxer Mathealira Seholohohlo was the baton bearer during the opening ceremony.

Lesotho finished the games with two bronze medals, both won in boxing. This marked the country's first medals in 20 years.

== Competitors ==
The following is the list of number of competitors participating at the Games per sport/discipline.

Sport	Men	Women	Total
Athletics	4	4	8
Boxing	4	2	6
Total	8	6	14

== Medallists ==
The following Basotho competitors won medals at the games. In the by discipline sections below, medallists' names are bolded.

Medal	Name	Sport	Event	Date	Ref.
Bronze	Pooana Khoahli	Boxing	Men's 65 kg	31 July	
Bronze	Rapelang Maselela	Boxing	Women's 57 kg	31 July	

== Athletics ==
Lesotho entered eight track and field athletes (four per gender).

Key

Ranks given for track events are within the athlete's heat only.

- **Q** = Qualified for the next round
- **q** = Qualified for the next round as a fastest loser or, in field events, by position without achieving the qualifying target

Track events
Men

Athlete	Event	Heat		Semifinal		Final	
Athlete	Event	Result	Rank	Result	Rank	Result	Rank
Mojela Koneshe	100 m	10.07 **NR**	1 **q**	10.19	7	Did not advance	
Mojela Koneshe	200 m	21.76	3	Did not advance			
Neo Ntelele	200 m	21.70	5	Did not advance			
Neo Ntelele	400 m	51.20	7	Did not advance			
Kente Mokheseng	200 m	22.42	6	Did not advance			
Kente Mokheseng	400 m	50.24	7	Did not advance			
Kamohelo Mofolo	5000 m	—N/a				13:34.02 **PB**	13
Kamohelo Mofolo	10,000 m	—N/a				28:01.00 **NR**	9

Women

Athlete	Event	Heat		Semifinal		Final	
Athlete	Event	Result	Rank	Result	Rank	Result	Rank
Malia Nalane	100 m	DNF		Did not advance			
Malia Nalane	200 m	DNS		Did not advance			
Mamakoli Senauoana	200 m	24.04	3	Did not advance			
Mamakoli Senauoana	400 m	53.45	5 **q**	53.91	6	Did not advance	
Manqabang Tsibela	800 m	2:03.64	5 **q**	2:03.93	8	Did not advance	
Manqabang Tsibela	Mile	4:45.44	9	—N/a		Did not advance	
Nthabiseng Lekotoko	5000 m	—N/a				DNS	
Nthabiseng Lekotoko	10,000 m	—N/a				34:52.00	14

== Boxing ==
Lesotho entered six boxers (four men and two women). Rapelang Maselela became the first women from Lesotho to win a Commonwealth Games medal across all sports.

Athlete	Event	Round of 32	Round of 16	Quarterfinals	Semifinals	Final	
Athlete	Event	Opposition Result	Opposition Result	Opposition Result	Opposition Result	Opposition Result	Rank
Mathealira Seholohohlo	Men's 55 kg	Rooney (NIR); **W** KO	Dixon (AUS); **L** 0–5	Did not advance			
Toka Litabe	Men's 60 kg	Bye	Moremi (BOT); **L** 2–3	Did not advance			
**Pooana Khoahli**	Men's 65 kg	Pao (NIU); **W** 5–0	Cope (JAM); **W** 5–0	Agathe (MRI); **W** 5–0	Cassar (AUS); **L** 0–5	Did not advance	3rd place, bronze medalist(s)
Refiloe Thai	Men's 70 kg	Foly (NGR); **W** 4–0	Bonne (SEY); **W** 5–0	Holley-Sotomi (WAL); **L** KO	Did not advance		
**Rapelang Maselela**	Women's 57 kg	—N/a	Bye	Kutaka (TAN); **W** 4–1	Lamboria (IND); **L** RSC	Did not advance	3rd place, bronze medalist(s)
Realeboha Segoete	Women's 60 kg	—N/a	Zahra (PAK); **L** RSC	Did not advance			
