= 2012 African Championships in Athletics – Women's long jump =

The women's long jump at the 2012 African Championships in Athletics was held at the Stade Charles de Gaulle on 28 and 29 June.

== Medalists ==
Gold	Blessing Okagbare; Nigeria
Silver	Janice Josephs; South Africa
Bronze	Lynique Prinsloo; South Africa

== Records ==
Standing records prior to the 2012 African Championships in Athletics
World record	Galina Chistyakova (URS)	7.52	Leningrad, Soviet Union	11 June 1988
African record	Chioma Ajunwa (NGR)	7.12	Atlanta, United States	2 August 1996
Championship record	Karen Botha (RSA)	6.78	Belle Vue Harel, Mauritius	25 June 1992
Championship record	Chioma Ajunwa (NGR)	6.78	Dakar, Senegal	20 August 1998
Broken records during the 2012 African Championships in Athletics
Championship record	Blessing Okagbare (NGR)	6.96	Porto-Novo, Benin	29 June 2012

== Schedule ==
Date	Time	Round
28 June 2012	13:30	Qualification
29 June 2012	16:40	Final

== Results ==
=== Qualification ===
Qualifying perf. 6.25 (Q) or 12 best performers (q) advanced to the Final.

Rank	Group	Athlete	Nationality	#1	#2	#3	Result	Notes
1	A	Lynique Prinsloo	South Africa	6.34			6.34	Q
2	A	Blessing Okagbare	Nigeria	6.29			6.29	Q
3	A	Janice Josephs	South Africa	5.80	5.91	6.15	6.15	q
4	B	Chinaza Amadi	Nigeria	6.01	6.04	–	6.04	q
5	A	Jamaa Chnaik	Morocco	5.90	5.88	5.96	5.96	q
6	B	Lissa Labiche	Seychelles	5.10	5.77	5.89	5.89	q
7	A	Janet Boniface	Seychelles	5.70	5.89	x	5.89	q
8	A	Yamina Hjaji	Morocco	5.74	5.82	5.68	5.82	q
9	A	Sarah Ngongoa	Cameroon	5.58	5.40	5.79	5.79	q
10	B	Enas Mansour	Egypt	5.75	5.59	5.77	5.77	q
11	A	Deborah Amoah	Ghana	5.74	5.61	5.67	5.74	q
12	B	Linda Simon	Ghana	5.38	5.72	5.51	5.72	q
13	B	Sandrine Mbummin	Cameroon	5.66	5.69	5.56	5.69	
14	B	Patience Ntshingila	South Africa	x	x	5.59	5.59	
15	A	Sangone Kandji	Senegal	5.24	5.53	5.55	5.55	
16	B	Konan Akissi Issifou	Ivory Coast	x	5.35	5.13	5.35	
17	B	Mariam Issofou	Benin	5.01	4.80	4.97	5.01	
18	A	Ghada Ali	Libya	4.52	4.43	4.54	4.54	
	B	Roumeissa Belabiod	Algeria				DNS	
	A	Mariette Mien	Burkina Faso				DNS	

=== Final ===
Rank	Athlete	Nationality	#1	#2	#3	#5	#5	#6	Result	Notes
1st place, gold medalist(s)	Blessing Okagbare	Nigeria	6.26	6.96	6.43	6.29	–	–	6.96	CR
2nd place, silver medalist(s)	Janice Josephs	South Africa	6.13w	6.05	6.09	6.29	6.23	6.27	6.29	
3rd place, bronze medalist(s)	Lynique Prinsloo	South Africa	6.09	x	6.15	5.98	6.22	x	6.22	
4	Jamaa Chnaik	Morocco	6.07	6.21w	x	x	5.96	x	6.21w	
5	Chinaza Amadi	Nigeria	6.04w	x	6.12	6.17	x	x	6.17	
6	Enas Mansour	Egypt	6.08	5.94	5.92	5.93	6.13	6.01	6.13	
7	Yamina Hjaji	Morocco	5.99w	6.00	x	x	5.71	5.81	6.00	
8	Sarah Ngongoa	Cameroon	5.04	5.82w	x	5.64	5.82	5.95	5.95	
9	Janet Boniface	Seychelles	5.45	5.74	5.75				5.75	
10	Deborah Amoah	Ghana	x	5.74w	5.65				5.74w	
11	Linda Simon	Ghana	5.55	5.63	5.74				5.74	
	Lissa Labiche	Seychelles	x	x	x				NM	
