= Athletics at the 2019 African Games – Women's long jump =

The women's long jump event at the 2019 African Games was held on 29 August in Rabat.

== Results ==
Rank	Name	Nationality	#1	#2	#3	#4	#5	#6	Result	Notes
1st place, gold medalist(s)	Ese Brume	Nigeria	6.68	6.53	6.66	6.51	–	6.69	6.69	
2nd place, silver medalist(s)	Deborah Acquah	Ghana	6.27	6.37	6.12	6.05	x	x	6.37	
3rd place, bronze medalist(s)	Lynique Beneke	South Africa	6.13	6.21	5.97	6.18	x	6.30	6.30	
4	Maxmila Imali	Kenya	6.14	5.92	6.15	x	6.19	6.27	6.27	
5	Zinzi Chabangu	South Africa	6.00	x	6.15	6.10	x	x	6.15	
6	Esraa Owis	Egypt	5.90	5.95	5.99	6.03	6.07	6.00	6.07	
7	Agate de Sousa	São Tomé and Príncipe	6.05	x	x	5.70	5.88	x	6.05	
8	Joëlle Mbumi Nkouindjin	Cameroon	x	6.01	5.88	6.03	6.02	5.92	6.03	
9	Yousra Lajdoud	Morocco	x	5.94	x				5.94	
10	Fayza Issaka	Togo	5.74	5.90	5.92				5.92	
11	Milcent Ndoro	Kenya	x	5.57	5.82				5.82	
12	Sangoné Kandji	Senegal	5.80	x	5.73				5.80	
13	Grace Chinonyelum Anigbata	Nigeria	5.60	5.73	5.77				5.77	
14	Prissy Mpofu	Zimbabwe	5.68	5.72	5.69				5.72	
15	Jamaa Chnaik	Morocco	x	5.69	x				5.69	
16	Hadel Aboud	Libya	5.42	5.20	5.23				5.42	
17	Gloria Mbaika Mulei	Kenya	5.38	5.33	x				5.38	
18	Kiru Oman	Ethiopia	5.17	5.22	5.34				5.34	
	Ajuda Oumde	Ethiopia							DNS	
	Lerato Sechele	Lesotho							DNS	
