= Lesotho at the 2006 Commonwealth Games =

- CGF code: LES
- CGA: Lesotho National Olympic Committee
- Website: lnoc.tripod.com

in Melbourne, Australia
- Medals: Gold 0 Silver 1 Bronze 0 Total 1

Commonwealth Games appearances (overview)
- 1974; 1978; 1982; 1986; 1990; 1994; 1998; 2002; 2006; 2010; 2014; 2018; 2022; 2026; 2030

Lesotho competed in the 2006 Commonwealth Games in Melbourne, Australia from 15 March – 26 March 2006.

== Medals ==
| | (gold) | (silver) | (bronze) | Total |
|---|---|---|---|---|
| Lesotho | 0 | 1 | 0 | 1 |

=== Silver ===
- Moses Kopo, Boxing, Light Welterweight 64 kg.
