= 2022 African Championships in Athletics – Women's triple jump =

The women's triple jump event at the 2022 African Championships in Athletics was held on 12 June in Port Louis, Mauritius.

== Results ==
Rank	Athlete	Nationality	#1	#2	#3	#4	#5	#6	Result	Notes
1st place, gold medalist(s)	Sangoné Kandji	Senegal	x	13.39	13.76	13.27	13.15	13.61	13.76	
2nd place, silver medalist(s)	Saly Sarr	Senegal	x	13.22	13.02	13.42	13.11	13.19	13.42	
3rd place, bronze medalist(s)	Véronique Kossenda Rey	Cameroon	13.18	12.78	13.04	13.13	13.35	13.12	13.35	
4	Liliane Potiron	Mauritius	x	13.04	13.18	13.17	13.21	x	13.21	
5	Esraa Samir	Egypt	12.55	12.95	12.84	12.92	x	x	12.95	
6	Lerato Sechele	Lesotho	x	12.83	12.55	12.83w	11.64	x	12.83w	
7	Pauline Raissa Ngouopou	Cameroon	x	12.54	12.28	12.75	12.35	11.64	12.75	
8	Fayza Issaka-Abdoukerim	Togo	11.84	11.87	12.34	12.21	12.28	12.27	12.34	
	Fatimata Zoungrana	Burkina Faso							DNS	
	Grace Anigbata	Nigeria							DNS	
	Mercy Honest Peter	Nigeria							DNS	
	Onaara Obamuwagun	Nigeria							DNS	
