= Athletics at the 2019 African Games – Women's triple jump =

The women's triple jump event at the 2019 African Games was held on 27 August in Rabat.

== Results ==
Rank	Name	Nationality	#1	#2	#3	#4	#5	#6	Result	Notes
1st place, gold medalist(s)	Grace Anigbata	Nigeria	13.75	13.24	12.93	12.92	13.21	13.03	13.75	
2nd place, silver medalist(s)	Jamaa Chnaik	Morocco	13.33	13.37	13.21	13.22	x	13.69	13.69	
3rd place, bronze medalist(s)	Zinzi Chabangu	South Africa	13.05	13.18	x	13.59	x	13.48	13.59	
4	Patience Ntshingila	South Africa	x	13.25	13.07	13.47	x	x	13.47	
5	Lerato Sechele	Lesotho	13.18	13.24	13.10	12.92	12.75	x	13.24	
6	Gloria Mbaika Mulei	Kenya	x	12.45	12.72	12.58	13.00	12.68	13.00	
7	Sangoné Kandji	Senegal	12.32	12.77	12.62	12.44	x	12.35	12.77	
8	Joëlle Mbumi Nkouindjin	Cameroon	12.11	12.72	12.29	x	x	11.81	12.72	
9	Esraa Owis	Egypt	12.56	12.49	12.62				12.62	
10	Liliane Potiron	Mauritius	12.44	12.53	12.30				12.53	
11	Ajuda Oumde	Ethiopia	12.21	12.38	12.26				12.38	
12	Amaru Otow	Ethiopia	12.29	x	12.18				12.29	
13	Maryam Ellouke	Morocco	11.56	12.12	11.66				12.12	
14	Dorothy Kavhumbura	Zimbabwe	11.51	12.11	11.95				12.11	
