= 2008 World Junior Championships in Athletics – Women's triple jump =

Championships in Athletics

The women's triple jump event at the 2008 World Junior Championships in Athletics was held in Bydgoszcz, Poland, at Zawisza Stadium on 8 and 10 July.

== Medalists ==
Gold	Dailenis Alcántara; Cuba
Silver	Yosleidis Rivalta; Cuba
Bronze	Paraskeví Papahrístou; Greece

== Results ==
=== Final ===
10 July

Rank	Name	Nationality	Attempts						Result	Notes
Rank	Name	Nationality	1	2	3	4	5	6	Result	Notes
1st place, gold medalist(s)	Dailenis Alcántara	Cuba	14.25 (w: -0.5 m/s)	14.06 (w: -0.4 m/s)	14.20 (w: -0.8 m/s)	13.50 (w: -0.5 m/s)	14.06 (w: -0.6 m/s)	14.18 (w: 0.0 m/s)	14.25 (w: -0.5 m/s)	
2nd place, silver medalist(s)	Yosleidis Rivalta	Cuba	13.64 (w: -0.1 m/s)	x	13.42 (w: -0.8 m/s)	13.66 (w: -0.2 m/s)	13.82 (w: -0.8 m/s)	13.85 (w: 0.0 m/s)	13.85 (w: 0.0 m/s)	
3rd place, bronze medalist(s)	Paraskeví Papahrístou	Greece	13.74 (w: -0.8 m/s)	13.73 (w: -0.2 m/s)	13.56 (w: -0.7 m/s)	x	13.60 (w: -1.1 m/s)	13.70 (w: -0.2 m/s)	13.74 (w: -0.8 m/s)	
4	Hanna Knyazheva	Ukraine	13.53 (w: -1.1 m/s)	13.36 (w: -0.9 m/s)	13.29 (w: -0.6 m/s)	13.61 (w: -0.2 m/s)	13.53 (w: -0.1 m/s)	13.06 (w: -0.2 m/s)	13.61 (w: -0.2 m/s)	
5	Carmen Toma	Romania	13.34 (w: -0.5 m/s)	13.05 (w: -0.3 m/s)	13.40 (w: -0.9 m/s)	x	13.31 (w: -0.2 m/s)	13.27 (w: -0.2 m/s)	13.40 (w: -0.9 m/s)	
6	Li Yanmei	China	13.23 (w: -0.1 m/s)	12.81 (w: -0.7 m/s)	12.96 (w: -0.2 m/s)	13.10 (w: -1.8 m/s)	12.51 (w: -0.3 m/s)	12.97 (w: -0.5 m/s)	13.23 (w: -0.1 m/s)	
7	Keshia Willix	France	x	12.99 (w: -1.2 m/s)	13.22 (w: -1.1 m/s)	x	x	x	13.22 (w: -1.1 m/s)	
8	Mathilde Boateng	France	12.31 (w: -1.2 m/s)	12.87 (w: 0.0 m/s)	13.15 (w: -0.9 m/s)	12.92 (w: -1.2 m/s)	x	11.75 (w: -0.2 m/s)	13.15 (w: -0.9 m/s)	
9	Maja Bratkic	Slovenia	12.61 (w: -0.2 m/s)	12.70 (w: -0.5 m/s)	13.09 (w: -0.1 m/s)				13.09 (w: -0.1 m/s)	
10	Jenny Elbe	Germany	12.80 (w: -0.1 m/s)	13.01 (w: -0.8 m/s)	x				13.01 (w: -0.8 m/s)	
11	Maike Nieklauson	Germany	12.66 (w: 0.0 m/s)	x	12.76 (w: 0.0 m/s)				12.76 (w: 0.0 m/s)	
12	Alisa Vlasova	Russia	x	12.58 (w: -0.5 m/s)	12.59 (w: -0.3 m/s)				12.59 (w: -0.3 m/s)	

=== Qualifications ===
8 July

==== Group A ====
Rank	Name	Nationality	Attempts			Result	Notes
Rank	Name	Nationality	1	2	3	Result	Notes
1	Yosleidis Rivalta	Cuba	13.61 (w: -0.4 m/s)	-	-	13.61 (w: -0.4 m/s)	Q
2	Paraskeví Papahrístou	Greece	13.31 (w: -0.7 m/s)	13.22 (w: -0.9 m/s)	13.30 (w: -0.5 m/s)	13.31 (w: -0.7 m/s)	q
3	Alisa Vlasova	Russia	12.36 (w: -0.6 m/s)	x	13.19 (w: -1.4 m/s)	13.19 (w: -1.4 m/s)	q
4	Maja Bratkic	Slovenia	12.68 (w: -0.3 m/s)	13.16 (w: -0.8 m/s)	12.81 (w: -0.3 m/s)	13.16 (w: -0.8 m/s)	q
5	Keshia Willix	France	x	13.16 (w: -0.6 m/s)	12.56 (w: -1.5 m/s)	13.16 (w: -0.6 m/s)	q
6	Maike Nieklauson	Germany	12.76 (w: -0.3 m/s)	12.29 (w: -0.5 m/s)	13.10 (w: -0.7 m/s)	13.10 (w: -0.7 m/s)	q
7	Federica De Santis	Italy	12.73 (w: -0.6 m/s)	12.97 (w: -0.1 m/s)	12.93 (w: 0.0 m/s)	12.97 (w: -0.1 m/s)	
8	Anna Jagaciak	Poland	12.42 (w: -0.1 m/s)	12.97 (w: 0.0 m/s)	12.36 (w: -0.7 m/s)	12.97 (w: 0.0 m/s)	
9	Liane Pintsaar	Estonia	12.69 (w: -0.6 m/s)	x	12.82 (w: -0.6 m/s)	12.82 (w: -0.6 m/s)	
10	Anelia Angelova	Bulgaria	12.61 (w: -0.6 m/s)	12.79 (w: -0.3 m/s)	12.45 (w: 0.0 m/s)	12.79 (w: -0.3 m/s)	
11	Mia Haave	Norway	12.49 (w: -0.8 m/s)	12.72 (w: -1.2 m/s)	12.54 (w: 0.0 m/s)	12.72 (w: -1.2 m/s)	
12	Hu Qian	China	12.46 (w: -0.1 m/s)	12.66 (w: -0.7 m/s)	x	12.66 (w: -0.7 m/s)	
13	Madara Apine	Latvia	12.34 (w: 0.0 m/s)	12.02 (w: 0.0 m/s)	12.40 (w: -0.3 m/s)	12.40 (w: -0.3 m/s)	
14	Cristina Sandu	Romania	12.30 (w: -0.1 m/s)	12.10 (w: -0.3 m/s)	12.29 (w: -0.5 m/s)	12.30 (w: -0.1 m/s)	
15	Ti'ara Walpool	United States	12.11 (w: -0.2 m/s)	12.03 (w: -0.3 m/s)	11.84 (w: -0.9 m/s)	12.11 (w: -0.2 m/s)	

==== Group B ====
Rank	Name	Nationality	Attempts			Result	Notes
Rank	Name	Nationality	1	2	3	Result	Notes
1	Dailenis Alcántara	Cuba	13.60 (w: -1.3 m/s)	-	-	13.60 (w: -1.3 m/s)	Q
2	Carmen Toma	Romania	12.93 (w: -0.4 m/s)	13.41 (w: -0.1 m/s)	-	13.41 (w: -0.1 m/s)	Q
3	Hanna Knyazheva	Ukraine	13.02 (w: -1.2 m/s)	13.32 (w: -0.2 m/s)	13.15 (w: -1.1 m/s)	13.32 (w: -0.2 m/s)	q
4	Li Yanmei	China	x	x	13.25 (w: -0.1 m/s)	13.25 (w: -0.1 m/s)	q
5	Jenny Elbe	Germany	13.16 (w: -0.3 m/s)	12.94 (w: -1.2 m/s)	12.96 (w: -0.5 m/s)	13.16 (w: -0.3 m/s)	q
6	Mathilde Boateng	France	x	13.12 (w: -0.4 m/s)	13.04 (w: 0.0 m/s)	13.12 (w: -0.4 m/s)	q
7	Lyudmila Grankovskaya	Kazakhstan	12.44 (w: -0.3 m/s)	12.53 (w: -0.3 m/s)	12.85 (w: -0.6 m/s)	12.85 (w: -0.6 m/s)	
8	Eleonora D'Elicio	Italy	12.79 (w: -0.3 m/s)	x	12.80 (w: -0.2 m/s)	12.80 (w: -0.2 m/s)	
9	Antoaneta Petkova	Bulgaria	12.45 (w: -0.6 m/s)	12.47 (w: -0.3 m/s)	12.79 (w: -0.5 m/s)	12.79 (w: -0.5 m/s)	
10	Yana Borodina	Russia	12.51 (w: -0.3 m/s)	x	12.40 (w: -0.4 m/s)	12.51 (w: -0.3 m/s)	
11	Valeriya Kanatova	Uzbekistan	12.37 (w: -0.6 m/s)	12.27 (w: -0.8 m/s)	12.37 (w: -0.1 m/s)	12.37 (w: -0.6 m/s)	
12	Ecaterina Malîhina	Moldova	12.36 (w: -0.4 m/s)	12.35 (w: -0.1 m/s)	12.09 (w: -0.6 m/s)	12.36 (w: -0.4 m/s)	
13	Vashti Thomas	United States	x	12.09 (w: -0.6 m/s)	12.10 (w: -0.2 m/s)	12.10 (w: -0.2 m/s)	
	Inger Anne Frøysedal	Norway	x	x	x	NM	

== Participation ==
According to an unofficial count, 29 athletes from 19 countries participated in the event.

- Bulgaria (2)
- China (2)
- Cuba (2)
- Estonia (1)
- France (2)
- Germany (2)
- Greece (1)
- Italy (2)
- Kazakhstan (1)
- Latvia (1)
- Moldova (1)
- Norway (2)
- Poland (1)
- Romania (2)
- Russia (2)
- Slovenia (1)
- Ukraine (1)
- United States (2)
- Uzbekistan (1)
