= Ball State Cardinals track and field =

American college track and field team

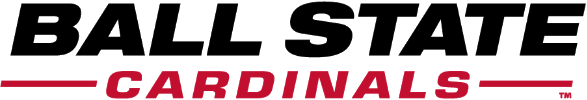
- University: Ball State University
- Head coach: Adrian Wheatley
- Conference: MAC
- Location: Muncie, Indiana
- Outdoor track: Briner Sports Complex
- Nickname: Cardinals
- Colors: Cardinal and white

The Ball State Cardinals track and field team is the track and field program that represents Ball State University. The Cardinals compete in NCAA Division I as a member of the Mid-American Conference. The team is based in Muncie, Indiana, at the Briner Sports Complex.

The program is coached by Adrian Wheatley. The track and field program officially encompasses four teams because the NCAA considers men's and women's indoor track and field and outdoor track and field as separate sports.

The men's teams were eliminated following the 2003 season for budgetary reasons.

High jumper Charity Hufnagel is the school's most recent national champion after winning the 2023 NCAA Division I Outdoor Track and Field Championships. The school's first national championship was by men's high jumper Darrell Jones in 1931.

== Postseason ==
=== AIAW ===
The Cardinals have had one AIAW All-American finishing in the top six at the AIAW indoor or outdoor championships.

AIAW All-Americans
Championships	Name	Event	Place
1975 Outdoor	Judy Sheets	High jump	3rd

=== NCAA ===
As of August 2025, a total of 10 men and 5 women have achieved individual first-team All-American status for the team at the Division I men's outdoor, women's outdoor, men's indoor, or women's indoor national championships (using the modern criteria of top-8 placing regardless of athlete nationality).

First team NCAA All-Americans
Team	Championships	Name	Event	Place	Ref.
Men's	1930 Outdoor	Darrell Jones	High jump	2nd	
Men's	1931 Outdoor	Darrell Jones	High jump	1st	
Men's	1936 Outdoor	Ben Stout	400 meters hurdles	5th	
Men's	1969 Indoor	John Kerr	Mile run	4th	
Men's	1969 Outdoor	Dave Kerr	Mile run	8th	
Men's	1972 Outdoor	Al Myers	3000 meters steeplechase	8th	
Men's	1977 Indoor	Kelley Marsh	1000 meters	1st	
Women's	1983 Outdoor	Bonnie Harrington	High jump	4th	
Women's	1984 Outdoor	Bonnie Harrington	High jump	4th	
Men's	1987 Indoor	Scott Sanders	Long jump	8th	
Men's	1989 Indoor	Scott Sanders	Long jump	6th	
Men's	1989 Outdoor	Scott Sanders	Long jump	8th	
Women's	1998 Outdoor	LaTasha Jenkins	200 meters	2nd	
Women's	1999 Indoor	LaTasha Jenkins	200 meters	6th	
Women's	1999 Outdoor	LaTasha Jenkins	100 meters	5th	
Women's	1999 Outdoor	LaTasha Jenkins	200 meters	1st	
Men's	2000 Outdoor	Adam Shunk	High jump	5th	
Men's	2002 Outdoor	Zach Riley	Hammer throw	7th	
Women's	2003 Indoor	Patricia Soman	Long jump	8th	
Women's	2003 Indoor	Patricia Soman	Triple jump	8th	
Men's	2003 Outdoor	Paul Panning	Pole vault	8th	
Women's	2022 Outdoor	Charity Hufnagel	High jump	5th	
Women's	2023 Indoor	Charity Hufnagel	High jump	5th	
Women's	2023 Outdoor	Charity Hufnagel	High jump	1st	
Women's	2023 Outdoor	Jenelle Rogers	Heptathlon	5th	
Women's	2024 Indoor	Jenelle Rogers	Pentathlon	2nd	
Women's	2024 Outdoor	Jenelle Rogers	Heptathlon	4th	
Women's	2025 Indoor	Jenelle Rogers	Pentathlon	7th	

== See also ==
- Category:Ball State Cardinals men's track and field athletes (2)
- Category:Ball State Cardinals women's track and field athletes (3)
