= Laura Samuel =

British triple jumper

Personal information
- Nationality: British (English)
- Born: 19 February 1991 (age 35) Leicester, England

Sport
- Sport: Athletics
- Event: triple jump
- Club: Leicester Coritanian AC
Medal record
Representing England
Women's Athletics
Commonwealth Games
Silver medal – second place	2014 Glasgow	Triple jump

Laura Samuel (born 19 February 1991) is a British track and field athlete who competes in the triple jump. She has a personal best of 14.09 m (46 ft 2 1/2 in) for the event, which ranks her third among British women. She was the silver medallist at the 2014 Commonwealth Games and also the 2010 World Junior Championships in Athletics.

== Career ==
Born in Leicester, she became involved in athletics while at primary school becoming interested after local coaches visited the pupils there. She joined the Leicester Coritanian Athletics Club and later joined Loughborough University's athletics team, when she began studying there.

Initially Samuel focused on short sprinting events, but by 2007 she had begun to focus more on long jump. She won in that discipline at the 2007 English Schools Championships and was runner-up the following year. In 2009, she switched to the triple jump and this immediately brought her higher up the national rankings: she won the English schools title, came fourth at the senior British Athletics Championships, and set a personal best of 12.98 m (42 ft 7 in). She won the senior national title in the triple jump in 2010. She went on to compete at her first international competition soon after and was the silver medallist at the 2010 World Junior Championships in Athletics, setting a British junior record of 13.75 m (45 ft 1 1/4 in) to place second behind the favourite Dailenys Alcántara.

Samuel won the British triple jump title indoors and outdoors in 2011, and also made her debut on the IAAF Diamond League circuit, placing seventh at the London Grand Prix. She equalled her personal best in 2012 and repeated as the outdoor UK champion in both 2012 and 2013. She began working with coach Aston Moore of Birchfield Harriers – one of the country's top jumping coaches.

She went unbeaten indoors in 2014, having wins at the London Indoor Games and Botnia Games before taking the British indoor title. At the British Championships outdoors she was beaten into second by Yamilé Aldama, bringing an end to Samuel's four-year streak at the national event. Both were selected to represent England at the 2014 Commonwealth Games. Samuel outdid her older compatriot in the final as Aldama failed to start the competition in Glasgow. Samuel jumped a personal best mark of 14.09 m (46 ft 2 1/2 in) – adding over thirty centimetres to her four-year-old personal best. This resulted in her taking a surprise silver medal behind Kimberly Williams of Jamaica. This performance moved her up to third on the all-time British triple jump lists after Ashia Hansen and Aldama.

== International competition record ==
Year	Competition	Venue	Position	Event	Notes
2010	World Junior Championships	Moncton, New Brunswick, Canada	2nd	Triple jump	13.75 m (+0.9 m/s)
2014	Commonwealth Games	Glasgow, Scotland	2nd	Triple jump	14.09 m
2016	European Championships	Amsterdam, Netherlands	15th (q)	Triple jump	13.65 m
