= Sangoné Kandji =

Senegalese athletics competitor

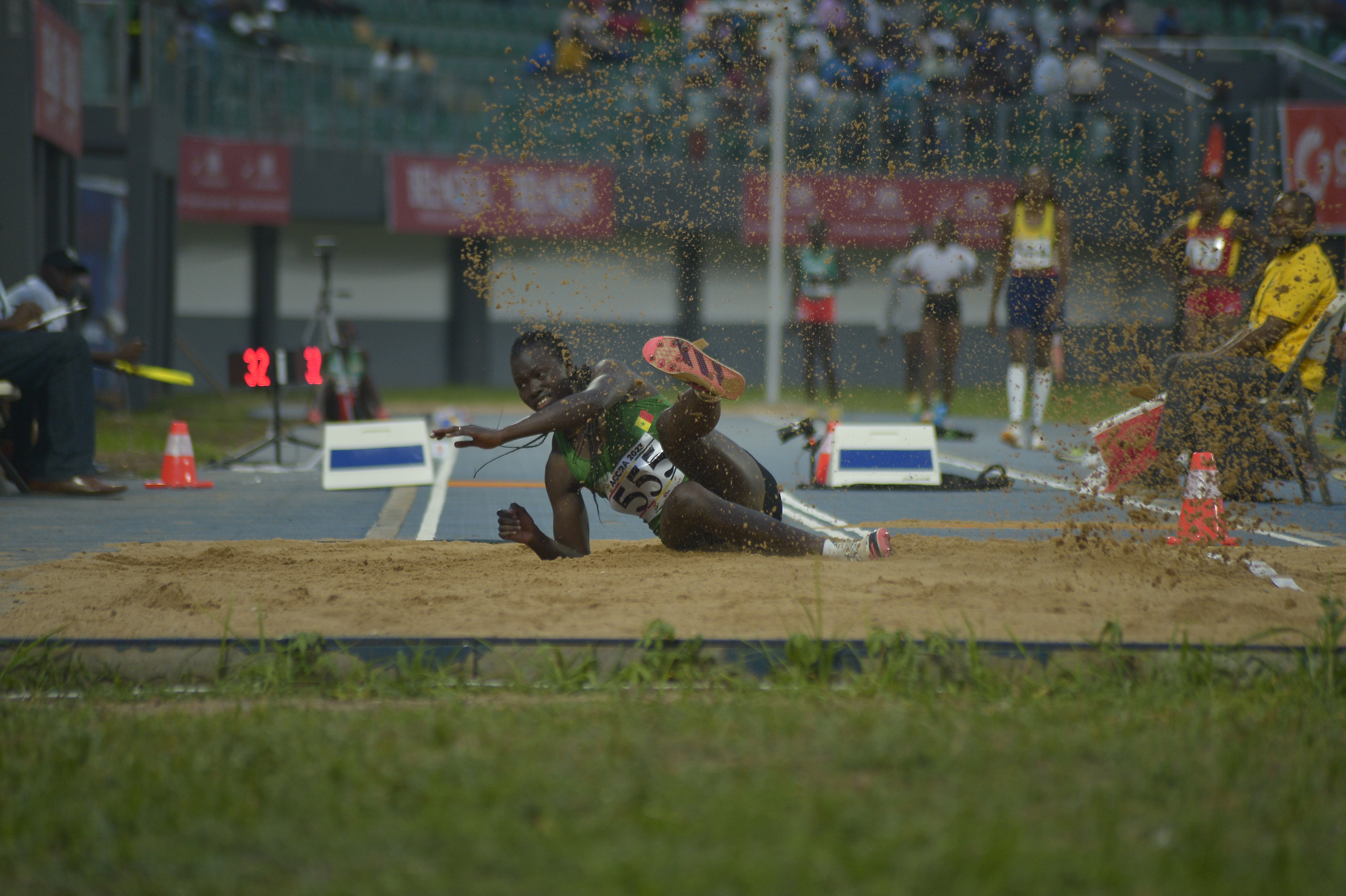
Sangoné Kandji at the 2023 African Games.

Sangoné Kandji (born 9 June 1992) is a Senegalese triple jumper and former long jumper. A mainstay in African continental competitions, she won the 2022 African Championships as well as the 2017 Islamic Solidarity Games.

== Long jump ==
In the age-specific categories, Kandji won the gold medal at the 2009 African Junior Championships and the bronze medal at the 2011 African Junior Championships. She finished ninth at the 2012 African Championships, sixth at the 2016 African Championships, fourth at the 2017 Islamic Solidarity Games, tenth at the 2017 Jeux de la Francophonie, sixth at the 2018 African Championships and twelfth at the 2019 African Games.

Her personal best jump is 6.14 metres, achieved in April 2012 in Dakar.

== Triple jump ==
She finished tenth at the 2012 African Championships, sixth at the 2016 African Championships, gold medal at the 2017 Islamic Solidarity Games, fifth at the 2017 Jeux de la Francophonie, sixth at the 2017 Summer Universiade, fifth at the 2018 African Championships, gold medal at the 2019 West African Championships, seventh at the 2019 African Games, seventh at the 2021 Islamic Solidarity Games (held in 2022), won the gold medal at the 2022 African Championships, finished fifth at the 2023 Jeux de la Francophonie, seventh at the 2023 African Games (held in 2024). Her first competition on global level finally came at the 2023 World Championships, where she competed without reaching the final round.

When becoming African champion in 2022, she was the first Senegalese medalist at this competition since 2016, together with Saly Sarr who took the silver behind her, and male long jumper Amath Faye. Kandji represented the club Jaraaf. In order to reach the 2023 World Championships and the 2024 Olympic Games, she trained in France under Christophe Limet in A3 Tours, then under Alain Doré in Amiens Université Club. She was the only Senegalese woman to qualify for the 2023 World Championships.

Her personal best jump is 13.76 metres, achieved at the 2022 African Championships in St Pierre, Mauritius.
