= 2018 African Championships in Athletics – Women's long jump =

The women's long jump event at the 2018 African Championships in Athletics was held on 3 August in Asaba, Nigeria.

== Results ==
Rank	Athlete	Nationality	#1	#2	#3	#4	#5	#6	Result	Notes
1st place, gold medalist(s)	Ese Brume	Nigeria	6.50	6.74	6.46	6.83	–	6.80	6.83	
2nd place, silver medalist(s)	Marthe Koala	Burkina Faso	6.22	6.23	x	6.54w	x	6.18	6.54w	
3rd place, bronze medalist(s)	Lynique Beneke	South Africa	6.32	x	6.38	x	x	x	6.38	
4	Zinzi Chabangu	South Africa	x	6.14	x	x	x	3.31	6.14	
5	Precious Okoronkwor	Nigeria	6.09	5.94	6.04	6.00w	5.94	x	6.09	
6	Sangone Kandji	Senegal	5.89w	6.01	5.91	5.91	6.06	5.98	6.06	
7	Priscillah Tabunda	Kenya	5.98	6.00w	5.92	x	x	x	6.00w	
8	Eleonore Bailly	Ivory Coast	5.60	5.93	x	5.80	x	5.90	5.93	
9	Esraa Owis	Egypt	5.54	5.86	x				5.86	
10	Aryat Dibow	Ethiopia	5.36	x	5.49				5.49	
11	Fatuma Lukundula	Democratic Republic of the Congo	3.60	4.58	4.73w				4.73w	
	Lerato Sechele	Lesotho							DNS	
