= Athletics at the 2014 Commonwealth Games – Women's long jump =

Women's long jump at the Commonwealth Games

The Women's long jump at the 2014 Commonwealth Games, as part of the athletics programme, was a two-day event held at Hampden Park on 30 and 31 July 2014.

== Records ==
World Record	7.52	Galina Chistyakova	URS	Leningrad, Soviet Union	11 June 1988
Games Record	6.97	Bronwyn Thompson	AUS	Melbourne, Australia	2006

== Qualifying round ==
Rank	Group	Name	#1	#2	#3	Result	Notes
3	A	Marlyne Ngo Ngoa (CMR)	5.99	6.00	6.52	6.52	Q, PB
4	A	Shara Proctor (ENG)	6.36	6.30	6.51	6.51	Q
8	A	Margaret Gayen (AUS)	6.13	6.10	–	6.34	q
9	A	Rebecca Camilleri (MLT)	x	6.31	6.13	6.31	q
12	A	Ese Brume (NGR)	6.29	6.20	6.22	6.29	q
15	A	Sarah Warnock (SCO)	x	x	6.22	6.22	SB
17	A	Tamara Myers (BAH)	5.90	5.94	6.14	6.14	
18	A	Mayoooka M Devassya Johny (IND)	6.00	6.20	5.89	6.11	
20	A	Gladys Musyoki (KEN)	x	6.04	x	6.04	
22	A	Eleftheria Christofi (CYP)	x	x	5.87	5.87	
24	A	Rechelle Meade (AIA)	5.54	x	5.75	5.75	=PB
1	B	Bianca Stuart (BAH)	6.67			6.67	Q, SB
2	B	Chantel Malone (IVB)	6.16	6.49	6.55	6.55	Q
5	B	Christabel Nettey (CAN)	6.42	6.47	–	6.47	q
6	B	Jazmin Sawyers (ENG)	6.39	x	6.23	6.39	q
7	B	Nektaria Panayi (CYP)	6.14	x	6.36	6.36	q
10	B	Joëlle Mbumi Nkouindjin (CMR)	6.08	x	6.30	6.30	q
11	B	Lorraine Ugen (ENG)	6.30	x	x	6.30	q
13	B	Jovanee Jarrett (JAM)	6.24	x	6.12	6.24	
14	B	Jade Nimmo (SCO)	6.12	6.20	6.23	6.23	
16	B	Jessica Penney (AUS)	6.03	x	6.14	6.14	
19	B	Elizabeth Dadzie (GHA)	5.86	6.12	6.11	6.11	PB
21	B	Arantxa King (BER)	x	6.02	x	6.02	
23	B	Ayanna Alexander (TRI)	x	5.77	5.69	5.77	
—N/a	A	Amy Harris (ANT)	x	x	x	NM	
—N/a	A	Marie Ngona Zibi (CMR)	x	x	x	DNS	
—N/a	A	Chanice Porter (JAM)	x	x	x	DNS	
—N/a	B	Lerato Sechele (LES)	x	x	x	DNS	

== Final round ==
Rank	Name	#1	#2	#3	#4	#5	#6	Result	Notes
1st place, gold medalist(s)	Ese Brume (NGR)	6.43	6.39	6.56	6.50	–	x	6.56	
2nd place, silver medalist(s)	Jazmin Sawyers (ENG)	6.30	6.10	6.47	5.83	6.40	6.54	6.54	SB
3rd place, bronze medalist(s)	Christabel Nettey (CAN)	6.47	6.49	6.39	6.39	6.27	6.49	6.49	
4	Chantel Malone (IVB)	6.41	x	x	x	6.12	6.26	6.41	
5	Lorraine Ugen (ENG)	6.29	6.36	6.29	x	x	6.39	6.39	SB
6	Margaret Gayen (AUS)	5.80	6.34	x	6.25	6.00	6.05	6.34	
7	Nektaria Panayi (CYP)	6.29	6.28	6.33	x	x	6.08	6.33	
8	Bianca Stuart (BAH)	6.20	x	6.31	6.14	x	6.06	6.31	
9	Rebecca Camilleri (MLT)	x	6.23	x				6.23	
10	Marlyne Ngo Ngoa (CMR)	x	6.20	6.11				6.20	
11	Joelle Mbumi Nkouindjin (CMR)	6.16	6.11	6.18				6.18	
—N/a	Shara Proctor (ENG)	x	r	–				NM	
