= Ese Brume =

Nigerian long jumper (born 1996)

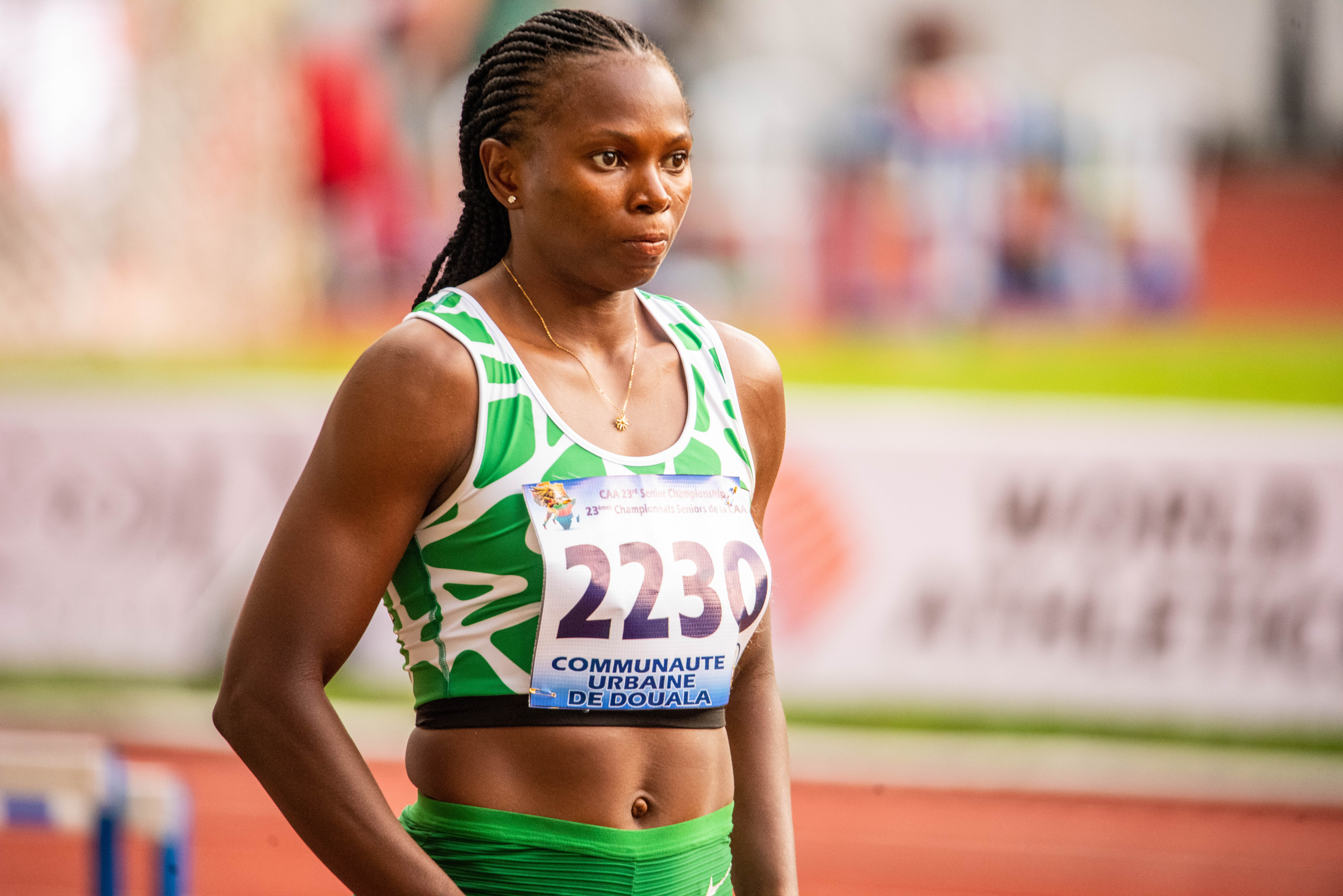
- Brume at the 2024 African Championships in Athletics

Personal information
- Born: 20 January 1996 (age 30) Ughelli, Delta State, Nigeria
- Years active: 2008–present.
- Height: 1.67 m (5 ft 6 in)
- Weight: 58 kg (128 lb)

Sport
- Country: Nigeria
- Sport: Athletics
- Event: Long jump
- Coached by: Kayode Yaya; Hasan Maydon

Achievements and titles
- Highest world ranking: 3
- Personal best: 7.17 m (Chula Vista 2021)
Medal record
Women's athletics
Representing Nigeria
Olympic Games
Bronze medal – third place	2020 Tokyo	Long jump
World Championships
Silver medal – second place	2022 Eugene	Long jump
Bronze medal – third place	2019 Doha	Long jump
World Indoor Championships
Silver medal – second place	2022 Belgrade	Long jump
Commonwealth Games
Gold medal – first place	2014 Glasgow	Long jump
Gold medal – first place	2022 Birmingham	Long jump
African Games
Gold medal – first place	2019 Rabat	Long jump
Gold medal – first place	2023 Accra	Long jump
African Championships
Gold medal – first place	2014 Marrakesh	Long jump
Gold medal – first place	2016 Durban	Long jump
Gold medal – first place	2018 Asaba	Long jump
Gold medal – first place	2024 Douala	Long jump
African Junior Championships
Gold medal – first place	2013 Bambous	Long jump
Silver medal – second place	2013 Bambous	Triple jump
Gold medal – first place	2013 Bambous	4×100 m relay
Gold medal – first place	2015 Addis Ababa	Long jump
Gold medal – first place	2015 Addis Ababa	Triple jump
Bronze medal – third place	2015 Addis Ababa	100 m
Gold medal – first place	2015 Addis Ababa	4×100 m relay

Ese Brume MON (born 20 January 1996) is a Nigerian athlete who specializes in the long jump. She is the current Commonwealth champion and a three-time African senior champion and holds a personal best of 7.17 m (23 ft 6 1/4 in) She currently holds the Commonwealth Games record, African junior record and African record in the event. She is a two-time medalist at the world athletics championship, an Olympic bronze medalist and a five-time African junior champion in athletics.

She is the only athlete to win three consecutive long jump titles at the African Championships in Athletics as well as the first African to win two long jump medals at the World Athletics Championships

Brume was the long jump gold medalist at the 2013 African Junior Athletics Championships, 2014 Commonwealth Games, 2014 African Senior Athletics Championships and 2015 African Junior Athletics Championships. She also represented Nigeria at the World Junior Championships in Athletics in 2014.

Brume represented Nigeria at the 2016 Olympic Games, where she placed 5th in the long jump final with a leap of 6.81m

Brume won the bronze medal in the long jump event at the 2019 World Athletics Championships in Doha, Qatar, with a jump of 6.91 m and at the 2020 Summer Olympics in Tokyo, with a jump of 6.97 m.

In 2022, she became the first African woman in history to jump four legal marks over 7.00m

== Career ==
Born in Ughelli, Delta State, Brume first emerged at the national level at the 2012 Nigerian Athletics Championships with former junior athletes Dakolo Emmanuel and Fabian Edoki. She placed sixth in the long jump, clearing over six meters. She also won the 18th National Sports Festival in Lagos. The following year she set a personal best of 6.53 m (21 ft 5 in) to place second nationally, behind Blessing Okagbare. She was one of the most successful athletes at the 2013 African Junior Athletics Championships: she won the long jump title, took silver in the triple jump, and was part of Nigeria's winning 4×100 meters relay team. She also placed fourth individually in the 100 meters. Brume successfully defended her long jump title at the next edition of the African Junior Athletics Championships in Addis Ababa. This time, she was even more successful as she added the triple jump and 4 × 100 m relay title, and a bronze medal in the individual 100 meters to her collection.

In May 2014, she ran a 100 m best of 11.84 seconds, then followed this with a long jump best and new African junior record of 6.60 m (21 ft 7 3/4 in) to win at the Warri Relays. She improved to 6.68 m (21 ft 10 3/4 in) at the Nigerian Championships to win her first national title. She was chosen for the discipline at the 2014 World Junior Championships in Athletics but, having flown to Eugene, Oregon just a day before competing, she performed poorly and was bottom of the qualifying. The Nigerian junior women's relay team also did not fare well, being eliminated in qualifying.

Just five days later, she represented Nigeria at the 2014 Commonwealth Games. Blessing Okagbare opted to compete in the sprints, so Brume was Nigeria's sole entrant for the event. The 18-year-old excelled in the Commonwealth Games long jump, clearing 6.56 m (21 ft 6 1/4 in) in the final to win the gold medal. Brume dedicated her victory to Emmanuel Uduaghan, Delta State's governor who invested in track and field infrastructure and support in the region. Okagbare, who won a Commonwealth sprint double, was also a product of the system, and Brume stated that she was inspired by the older athlete's achievements. As a result of her own medal feats, Brume was given an athletic scholarship to study in the United States, with local government support.

== 2016 ==
Having already secured the qualification standard for the Rio Olympics with her personal record jump in June 2016 at the Akure Golden League, Brume headed to Durban for the African Athletics Championships as the African leader in her event. She successfully defended her title from the previous championships.

Brume qualified for the Rio Olympics long jump final as the third-best athlete in her pool. This placed her in sixth position going into the final of the event. She eventually ended the competition in fifth place, leaping a distance of 6.81 meters which was just 2 centimeters shy of her personal record, which she had set earlier in the year.

== 2018 ==
Brume became a double Turkish Universities champion at the Turkey Koç Fest Universities Sports Games, representing her university, Eastern Mediterranean University. She set a meeting record, and African lead of 6.82 m at the first leg of the 2018 World Challenge series in Kingston, Jamaica. This mark remained the best jump by an African athlete until the 2018 African Championships in Athletics in Asaba. There, she increased her African lean by a centimeter to win her third consecutive African senior title. She then represented Africa at the Ostrava Continental Cup, where she placed fourth. 2018 also saw Brume defend her title at the 19th Nigerian National Sports Festival in Abuja, in a new festival record of 6.62 meters.

== 2019 ==
Brume was shortlisted as a nominee in the StarQt Award in the Africa Sportswoman of the Year category. She was the only Nigerian athlete nominated in any category. The event was held in October in Johannesburg.

She became the African Games champion in the Long Jump on 29 August 2019. This was her first African games title. On 24 July 2019, in Erzurum, she improved her personal best to 6.96m despite a very strong headwind (−2.1 m/s). At the Turkish championships in Bursa on 4 August, she broke the 7-meter barrier for the first time in her career surpassing that mark twice in the competition. Her jump of 7.05 m (+ 0.9 m/s) was the second-best African performance in history. On 6 October, she won the bronze medal in the World Championships with a jump of 6.91m. Her medal was Nigeria's only medal at the competition and a first since 2013.

== 2021 ==
She broke the African Record in the long jump set by Chioma Ajunwa.

At the 2020 Summer Olympics, she won a bronze medal in the long jump event. Her medal was Nigeria's only medal in Athletics at the event and the first Athletics medal at the Olympics since 2008.

== 2022 ==
At the 2022 World Athletics Indoor Championships, she won a silver medal in the long jump event, Nigeria's only medal in the competition. She also won another silver medal at the 2022 World Athletics Championships, becoming the first African to win two Long Jump medals at the World Athletics Championships At the 2022 Commonwealth Games, she won gold at the women long jump event and also broke the game record in the event with her 7.00m jump. She holds the new game record after breaking the record of Australia's Bronwyn Thompson, who previously held the record with her 6.97m jump.

== Personal life ==
In 2021, her younger brother Godson Okeoghene Brume broke the African u-18 100-meter record with 10.13 s.

== National titles ==
- Long Jump: 2014, 2016, 2017

== Personal bests ==
- 100 metres – 11.41 sec (Bursa 2019)
- Long jump – 7.17 m (23 ft 6 1/4 in) (Chula Vista, 2021)
- Triple jump – 13.16 m (43 ft 2 in) (Addis Ababa 2015)

== International competition record ==
Year	Competition	Venue	Position	Event	Result
2013	African Junior Championships	Bambous, Mauritius	1st	4 × 100 m relay	46.28
2013	African Junior Championships	Bambous, Mauritius	1st	Long jump	6.33 m (w)
2013	African Junior Championships	Bambous, Mauritius	2nd	Triple jump	12.52 m (w)
2014	World Junior Championships	Eugene, United States	11th (h)	4 × 100 m relay	45.93
2014	World Junior Championships	Eugene, United States	33rd (q)	Long jump	5.18 m (wind: -0.3 m/s)
2014	Commonwealth Games	Glasgow, United Kingdom	1st	Long jump	6.56 m
2015	African Junior Championships	Addis Ababa, Ethiopia	3rd	100 m	11.86
2015	African Junior Championships	Addis Ababa, Ethiopia	1st	4 × 100 m relay	44.83
2015	African Junior Championships	Addis Ababa, Ethiopia	1st	Long jump	6.33 m
2015	African Junior Championships	Addis Ababa, Ethiopia	1st	Triple jump	13.16 m
2015	African Games	Brazzaville, Republic of the Congo	4th	Long jump	6.23 m
2016	Olympic Games	Rio de Janeiro, Brazil	5th	Long jump	6.81 m
2017	World Championships	London, United Kingdom	17th (q)	Long jump	6.38 m
2018	African Championships	Asaba, Nigeria	1st	Long jump	6.83 m
2019	African Games	Rabat, Morocco	1st	Long jump	6.69 m
2019	World Championships	Doha, Qatar	3rd	Long jump	6.91 m
2021	Olympic Games	Tokyo, Japan	3rd	Long jump	6.97 m
2021	Olympic Games	Tokyo, Japan	12th (h)	4 × 100 m relay	43.25
2022	World Indoor Championships	Belgrade, Serbia	2nd	Long jump	6.85 m
2022	World Championships	Eugene, United Kingdom	2nd	Long jump	7.02 m
2022	Commonwealth Games	Birmingham, United Kingdom	1st	Long jump	7.00 m
2023	World Championships	Budapest, Hungary	4th	Long jump	6.84 m
2024	African Games	Accra, Ghana	1st	Long jump	6.92 m (w)
2024	African Championships	Douala, Cameroon	1st	Long jump	6.73 m
2024	Olympic Games	Paris, France	5th	Long jump	6.70 m
2025	World Championships	Tokyo, Japan	19th (q)	Long jump	6.46 m

Alma Matar She attended Delta State University
