= Li Yanmei =

Chinese triple jumper (born 1990)

Personal information
- Born: February 6, 1990 (age 36)
- Height: 1.72 m (5 ft 7 1/2 in)
- Weight: 56 kg (123 lb)

Sport
- Country: China
- Sport: Athletics
- Event: Triple jump
Medal record
Women's athletics
Representing China
Asian Indoor Championships
Silver medal – second place	2012 Hangzhou	Triple jump

Li Yanmei (Chinese: 李艳梅; born February 6, 1990, in Chaozhou) is a Chinese triple jumper. She placed 30th overall in the women's triple jump event at the 2012 Summer Olympics with a jump of 13.43 metres.

== International competitions ==
Year	Competition	Venue	Position	Event	Notes
Representing China
2008	Asian Junior Championships	Jakarta, Indonesia	2nd	Long jump	6.28 m
2008	Asian Junior Championships	Jakarta, Indonesia	1st	Triple jump	13.60 m
2008	World Junior Championships	Bydgoszcz, Poland	6th	Triple jump	13.23 m (wind: -0.1 m/s)
2009	Asian Indoor Games	Hanoi, Vietnam	4th	Triple jump	13.68 m
2011	Asian Championships	Kobe, Japan	4th	Triple jump	13.97 m
2011	World Championships	Daegu, South Korea	29th (q)	Triple jump	13.52 m
2012	Asian Indoor Championships	Hangzhou, China	2nd	Triple jump	13.73 m
2012	World Indoor Championships	Istanbul, Turkey	7th	Triple jump	14.02 m
2012	Olympic Games	London, United Kingdom	30th (q)	Triple jump	13.43 m
2014	World Indoor Championships	Sopot, Poland	5th	Triple jump	14.19 m
2014	Asian Games	Incheon, South Korea	4th	Triple jump	13.71 m
2015	Asian Championships	Wuhan, China	2nd	Triple jump	13.57 m
2015	World Championships	Beijing, China	20th (q)	Triple jump	13.57 m
