= Boxing at the 2018 Commonwealth Games – Men's lightweight =

Boxing competitions

Boxing – Men's lightweight at the 2018 Commonwealth Games
- Venue: Oxenford Studios
- Dates: 5 – 14 April 2018
- Competitors: 20 from 20 nations

Medalists
gold medal	Harry Garside	Australia
silver medal	Manish Kaushik	India
bronze medal	James McGivern	Northern Ireland
bronze medal	Mickey McDonagh	Wales

The men's lightweight boxing competitions at the 2018 Commonwealth Games in Gold Coast, Australia took place between 5 and 14 April at Oxenford Studios. Lightweights were limited to those boxers weighing less than 60 kilograms.

Like all Commonwealth boxing events, the competition was a straight single-elimination tournament. Both semifinal losers were awarded bronze medals, so no boxers competed again after their first loss. Bouts consisted of three rounds of three minutes each, with one-minute breaks between rounds. Beginning this year, the competition was scored using the "must-ten" scoring system.

== Schedule ==
The schedule is as follows:

All times are Australian Eastern Standard Time (UTC+10)

Date	Time	Round
Thursday 5 April 2018	12:02 & 18:32	Round of 32
Monday 9 April 2018	12:47 & 19:17	Round of 16
Wednesday 11 April 2018	18:32	Quarter-finals
Friday 13 April 2018	13:02	Semi-finals
Saturday 14 April 2018	12:32	Final

== Results ==
The draw is as follows:

Round of 32
Nicholas Okoth (KEN)	0
Michael Alexander (TTO)	5
Emmaniel Ngoma (ZAM)	5
Tevii Steven (KIR)	0
Harry Garside (AUS)	5
Abdul Omar (GHA)	0
Thadius Katua (PNG)	3
Adeola Soyoye (NGR)	1

Round of 16
Manish Kaushik (IND)	4
Michael Alexander (TTO)	0
Ali Ahmad (PAK)	0
Calum French (ENG)	5
Tuihalangingie Vea (TGA)	0
Jean Colin (MRI)	4
Emmaniel Ngoma (ZAM)
James McGivern (NIR)	RSC
Tryagain Ndevelo (NAM)	0
Harry Garside (AUS)	5
Nathaniel Collins (SCO)	3
Colan Caleb (NRU)	2
Mickey McDonagh (WAL)	5
Qhobosheane Mohlerepe (LES)	0
Thadius Katua (PNG)	RSC
Henry Kia (SOL)

Quarterfinals
Manish Kaushik (IND)	5
Calum French (ENG)	0
Jean Colin (MRI)	0
James McGivern (NIR)	5
Harry Garside (AUS)	5
Nathaniel Collins (SCO)	0
Mickey McDonagh (WAL)	5
Thadius Katua (PNG)	0

Semifinals
Manish Kaushik (IND)	4
James McGivern (NIR)	1
Harry Garside (AUS)	3
Mickey McDonagh (WAL)	2

Final
Manish Kaushik (IND)	2
Harry Garside (AUS)	3
