= 2010 World Junior Championships in Athletics – Women's triple jump =

The women's triple jump event at the 2010 World Junior Championships in Athletics was held in Moncton, New Brunswick, Canada, at Moncton Stadium on 21 and 22 July.

== Medalists ==
Gold	Dailenis Alcántara; Cuba
Silver	Laura Samuel; United Kingdom
Bronze	Deng Linuo; China

== Results ==
=== Final ===
22 July

Rank	Name	Nationality	Attempts						Result	Notes
Rank	Name	Nationality	1	2	3	4	5	6	Result	Notes
1st place, gold medalist(s)	Dailenis Alcántara	Cuba	13.76 w (w: +2.7 m/s)	13.81 (w: +0.8 m/s)	14.09 (w: +2.0 m/s)	13.73 (w: +1.1 m/s)	13.82 (w: +0.7 m/s)	13.77 (w: +1.2 m/s)	14.09 (w: +2.0 m/s)	
2nd place, silver medalist(s)	Laura Samuel	United Kingdom	x	13.49 (w: +1.7 m/s)	13.57 (w: +1.4 m/s)	13.75 (w: +0.9 m/s)	13.66 (w: +0.8 m/s)	x	13.75 (w: +0.9 m/s)	
3rd place, bronze medalist(s)	Deng Linuo	China	13.31 (w: +1.5 m/s)	13.72 (w: +1.8 m/s)	13.51 (w: +1.7 m/s)	13.20 (w: +0.9 m/s)	13.58 (w: +1.1 m/s)	13.16 (w: +1.3 m/s)	13.72 (w: +1.8 m/s)	
4	Valeriya Kanatova	Uzbekistan	13.44 (w: +1.7 m/s)	13.43 (w: +1.7 m/s)	13.24 (w: +0.8 m/s)	13.22 (w: +1.2 m/s)	13.33 (w: +0.7 m/s)	13.68 (w: +1.2 m/s)	13.68 (w: +1.2 m/s)	
5	Maja Bratkic	Slovenia	13.32 w (w: +2.4 m/s)	13.54 (w: +1.3 m/s)	13.42 w (w: +2.1 m/s)	13.65 (w: +1.3 m/s)	13.35 (w: +1.3 m/s)	13.38 (w: +0.5 m/s)	13.65 (w: +1.3 m/s)	
6	Gayathri Govindharaj	India	12.56 w (w: +2.4 m/s)	13.29 w (w: +3.6 m/s)	13.02 (w: +1.8 m/s)	13.07 (w: +0.9 m/s)	x	-	13.29 w (w: +3.6 m/s)	
7	Kristiina Mäkelä	Finland	13.13 w (w: +3.4 m/s)	13.01 w (w: +2.5 m/s)	13.26 (w: +1.4 m/s)	x	x	12.84 (w: +1.3 m/s)	13.26 (w: +1.4 m/s)	
8	Neele Eckhardt	Germany	x	12.91 w (w: +2.1 m/s)	x	12.22 (w: +1.6 m/s)	12.56 (w: +0.9 m/s)	12.50 (w: +1.5 m/s)	12.91 w (w: +2.1 m/s)	
9	Andrea Geubelle	United States	12.71 (w: +2.0 m/s)	12.87 (w: +1.3 m/s)	11.33 (w: +1.7 m/s)				12.87 (w: +1.3 m/s)	
10	Kateryna Kravchenko	Ukraine	x	12.66 (w: +2.0 m/s)	12.58 (w: +0.9 m/s)				12.66 (w: +2.0 m/s)	
11	Tatiana Cicanci	Moldova	12.31 (w: +1.4 m/s)	12.65 (w: +1.2 m/s)	12.40 w (w: +2.4 m/s)				12.65 (w: +1.2 m/s)	
	Mégane Beaufour	France	x	-	-				NM	

=== Qualifications ===
21 July

==== Group A ====
Rank	Name	Nationality	Attempts			Result	Notes
Rank	Name	Nationality	1	2	3	Result	Notes
1	Maja Bratkic	Slovenia	13.45 (w: +1.3 m/s)	-	-	13.45 (w: +1.3 m/s)	Q
2	Valeriya Kanatova	Uzbekistan	13.36 (w: +1.3 m/s)	-	-	13.36 (w: +1.3 m/s)	Q
3	Neele Eckhardt	Germany	12.92 (w: +0.3 m/s)	13.13 (w: +0.4 m/s)	x	13.13 (w: +0.4 m/s)	q
4	Kristiina Mäkelä	Finland	x	13.02 (w: +1.2 m/s)	13.07 (w: +1.1 m/s)	13.07 (w: +1.1 m/s)	q
5	Laura Samuel	United Kingdom	x	12.98 (w: +0.1 m/s)	x	12.98 (w: +0.1 m/s)	q
5	Gayathri Govindharaj	India	x	x	12.98 (w: +1.3 m/s)	12.98 (w: +1.3 m/s)	q
7	Olga Salomatina	Russia	12.69 (w: +0.6 m/s)	12.75 (w: -1.1 m/s)	12.78 (w: +0.3 m/s)	12.78 (w: +0.3 m/s)	
8	Andreea Todereanu	Romania	12.65 (w: +0.2 m/s)	11.13 (w: +0.4 m/s)	x	12.65 (w: +0.2 m/s)	
9	Aleksandra Holub	Ukraine	12.57 (w: NWI)	12.07 (w: -0.7 m/s)	x	12.57 (w: NWI)	
10	Bianca dos Santos	Brazil	12.52 (w: +0.1 m/s)	x	12.30 (w: -0.8 m/s)	12.52 (w: +0.1 m/s)	
11	Anastasía Foutsitzídou	Greece	11.62 (w: -1.2 m/s)	11.89 (w: +0.2 m/s)	12.47 (w: +1.5 m/s)	12.47 (w: +1.5 m/s)	
12	Bae Chan-Mi	South Korea	12.45 (w: +1.3 m/s)	x	x	12.45 (w: +1.3 m/s)	
13	Giselly Landázury	Colombia	11.48 (w: 0.0 m/s)	12.07 (w: -1.8 m/s)	12.05 (w: -0.6 m/s)	12.07 (w: -1.8 m/s)	
14	Bojana Vukovic	Serbia	12.05 (w: +0.2 m/s)	12.04 (w: -0.7 m/s)	11.95 (w: +0.2 m/s)	12.05 (w: +0.2 m/s)	

==== Group B ====
Rank	Name	Nationality	Attempts			Result	Notes
Rank	Name	Nationality	1	2	3	Result	Notes
1	Dailenis Alcántara	Cuba	13.58 (w: +1.6 m/s)	-	-	13.58 (w: +1.6 m/s)	Q
2	Deng Linuo	China	13.35 (w: NWI)	-	-	13.35 (w: NWI)	Q
3	Andrea Geubelle	United States	13.02 (w: +0.9 m/s)	12.58 (w: -0.2 m/s)	12.46 (w: 0.0 m/s)	13.02 (w: +0.9 m/s)	q
4	Mégane Beaufour	France	12.48 (w: NWI)	13.00 (w: +0.2 m/s)	12.81 (w: 0.0 m/s)	13.00 (w: +0.2 m/s)	q
5	Tatiana Cicanci	Moldova	12.86 (w: +0.7 m/s)	12.72 (w: -0.5 m/s)	12.97 (w: -0.5 m/s)	12.97 (w: -0.5 m/s)	q
6	Kateryna Kravchenko	Ukraine	12.85 (w: +0.7 m/s)	12.77 (w: +0.3 m/s)	12.48 (w: +0.4 m/s)	12.85 (w: +0.7 m/s)	q
7	Yana Borodina	Russia	12.74 (w: +0.1 m/s)	12.85 (w: -0.7 m/s)	12.75 (w: +0.1 m/s)	12.85 (w: -0.7 m/s)	
8	Kristin Franke-Björkman	Sweden	x	12.76 (w: -1.5 m/s)	12.64 (w: -0.4 m/s)	12.76 (w: -1.5 m/s)	
9	Gabriela Petrova	Bulgaria	12.45 (w: +0.1 m/s)	12.71 (w: +0.4 m/s)	12.74 (w: +0.4 m/s)	12.74 (w: +0.4 m/s)	
10	Yekaterina Ektova	Kazakhstan	12.74 (w: -0.1 m/s)	12.42 (w: +1.1 m/s)	12.62 (w: +0.8 m/s)	12.74 (w: -0.1 m/s)	
11	Santa Matule	Latvia	12.57 (w: -0.3 m/s)	x	12.65 (w: +0.2 m/s)	12.65 (w: +0.2 m/s)	
12	Caroline Ehrhardt	Canada	x	12.47 (w: +0.4 m/s)	12.50 (w: -0.2 m/s)	12.50 (w: -0.2 m/s)	
13	Fenja Hublitz	Germany	x	12.11 (w: -0.8 m/s)	12.35 (w: -1.0 m/s)	12.35 (w: -1.0 m/s)	
14	Yudelsy González	Venezuela	x	12.27 (w: -0.4 m/s)	12.07 (w: -0.2 m/s)	12.27 (w: -0.4 m/s)	

== Participation ==
According to an unofficial count, 28 athletes from 25 countries participated in the event.

- Brazil (1)
- Bulgaria (1)
- Canada (1)
- China (1)
- Colombia (1)
- Cuba (1)
- Finland (1)
- France (1)
- Germany (2)
- Greece (1)
- India (1)
- Kazakhstan (1)
- Latvia (1)
- Moldova (1)
- Romania (1)
- Russia (2)
- Serbia (1)
- Slovenia (1)
- South Korea (1)
- Sweden (1)
- Ukraine (2)
- United Kingdom (1)
- United States (1)
- Uzbekistan (1)
- Venezuela (1)
