= Margaret Gayen =

Australian long jumper and sprinter

Margaret Gayen (born 10 July 1994) is an Australian long jumper and engineer.

In her main event she finished sixth at the 2014 Commonwealth Games and eighth at the 2014 Continental Cup. She also competed at the 2012 World Junior Championships without reaching the final.

In the 4 × 100 metres relay she finished fifth at the 2014 Commonwealth Games. She also competed at the 2014 World Relays without reaching the final.

She also competed in the 2011 Commonwealth Youth Games where she won two bronze medals, in the Long Jump and 4×100 metres relay.

Her personal best long jump is 6.62 metres, achieved in January 2014 in Adelaide.
