= Matlohang Moiloa-Ramoqopo =

Intl Olympic committee member from Lesotho

- Born: 1 November 1967 (age 58)
- Known for: Olympic Committee member

Matlohang Moiloa-Ramoqopo (born November 1, 1967) is an International Olympic Committee member from Lesotho. She was a table-tennis player before she took an interest in sports administration. She was the first woman to lead a national olympic committee when she was first elected in 2009.

== Life ==
Moiloa-Ramoqopo was born in 1967. In 1994 she graduated with a science degree from the University of Lesotho and went to work lecturing in Science and Engineering at the Lerotholi Polytechnic in Maseru. She left there in 1997 to teach at her alma mater and in 1999 she went to compete at table tennis at the All-Africa Games in Johannesburg.

She went to France to obtain her master's degree in Sports Organisation Management from the University of Lyon in 2007. In 2013 she took another first degree at the University of South Africa. In 2017 she became a deputy head teacher.

She was the first woman to lead a national olympic committee when she was elected to be the President of the Lesotho National Olympic Committee in 2009. She served for the four-year term and she was then reelected. In 2015 she hosted a meeting of 50 African countries as part of the African National Olympic Committee Association’s (ANOCA) "seminar of secretaries general".

In 2017 she was elected for the third time. During her presidency Lesotho won no Olympic medals which continued a trend that began in 1972 when Lesotho first competed at the games.

The country's first gold medal was at a Commonwealth Games Marathon in 1998.

She became a member of the International Olympic Committee in 2019. In 2021 she was elected to be the second vice-president of ANOCA having previously been the third V-P. ANOCA's president was Mustapha Berraf of Algeria. In the same year she was succeeded as President of Lesotho National Olympic Committee after twelve years by former vice-president Tlali Rampoona.
