= Yana Borodina =

Russian athlete

Personal information
- Full name: Yana Borodina
- Born: 21 April 1992 (age 34)

Sport
- Country: Russia
- Sport: Athletics
- Event: Triple Jump

Achievements and titles
- Regional finals: 3rd at the 2012 European Championships

Yana Borodina (born 21 April 1992) is a Russian athlete who competes in the triple jump with a personal best result of 14.41 metres. She won the bronze medal at the 2012 European Athletics Championships in Helsinki.

== Competition record ==
Year	Competition	Venue	Position	Event	Notes
Representing Russia
2008	World Junior Championships	Bydgoszcz, Poland	22nd (q)	Triple jump	12.51 m (wind: -0.3 m/s)
2009	World Youth Championships	Brixen, Italy	1st	Triple jump	13.63 m
2010	World Junior Championships	Moncton, New Brunswick, Canada	13th (q)	Triple jump	12.85 m (wind: -0.7 m/s)
2011	European Junior Championships	Tallinn, Estonia	1st	Triple jump	14.00 m
2012	European Championships	Helsinki, Finland	3rd	Triple jump	14.36 m
2013	European U23 Championships	Tampere, Finland	5th	Triple jump	13.45 m (wind: +0.6 m/s)
