= James McGivern =

Irish boxer (born 1998)

Personal information
- Nationality: Irish
- Born: 6 January 1998 (age 28) Belfast, Northern Ireland
- Height: 177 cm (5 ft 9 1/2 in)
- Weight: lightweight

Boxing career
- Stance: southpaw
Medal record
Representing Ireland
European Schoolboys Championships
Gold medal – first place	2012 Anapa	48kg
European Youth Championships
Silver medal – second place	2015 Kołobrzeg	lightweight
Representing Northern Ireland
Commonwealth Youth Games
Gold medal – first place	2015 Apia	bantamweight
Commonwealth Games
Bronze medal – third place	2018 Gold Coast	lightweight

James McGivern (born 6 January 1998) is a boxer from Belfast Northern Ireland. He trains at St. George's ABC, Belfast.

In 2015, he won gold at bantamweight at the Commonwealth Youth Games. A few months later, competing above his natural class, McGivern claimed silver at the European Youth Championships. Both medals came when McGivern was in his first year at Youth level.

In 2016, he was controversially beaten in the opening round of the European Youths. At lightweight, he won bronze at the 2018 Commonwealth Games.
