= 2018 African Championships in Athletics – Women's triple jump =

The women's triple jump event at the 2018 African Championships in Athletics was held on 5 August in Asaba, Nigeria.

== Results ==
Rank	Athlete	Nationality	#1	#2	#3	#4	#5	#6	Result	Notes
1st place, gold medalist(s)	Grace Anigbata	Nigeria	13.30	14.02	13.13	13.33	13.76	13.72	14.02	
2nd place, silver medalist(s)	Zinzi Chabangu	South Africa	13.04	x	13.59	x	x	x	13.59	
3rd place, bronze medalist(s)	Lerato Sechele	Lesotho	13.30	13.31	x	x	x	13.25	13.31	
4	Patience Ntshingila	South Africa	12.74	x	13.15	x	x	?	13.15	
5	Sangoné Kandji	Senegal	12.75	13.01	x	x	12.54	x	13.01	
6	Blessing Ibrahim	Nigeria	11.64	x	12.71	x	12.48	12.97	12.97	
7	Liliane Potiron	Mauritius	12.43	12.49	x	12.26	12.45	12.58	12.58	
8	Esraa Owis	Egypt	12.22	12.01	12.13	12.22	x	12.06	12.22	
9	Fatoumata Koala	Burkina Faso	x	11.96	x				11.96	
	Joan Cherono	Kenya							DNS	
	Aryat Dibow	Ethiopia							DNS	
