= 2016 African Championships in Athletics – Women's triple jump =

The women's triple jump event at the 2016 African Championships in Athletics was held on 26 June in Kings Park Stadium.

== Results ==
Rank	Athlete	Nationality	Result	Notes
1st place, gold medalist(s)	Nadia Eke	Ghana	13.42w	
2nd place, silver medalist(s)	Joëlle Mbumi Nkouindjin	Cameroon	13.37	
3rd place, bronze medalist(s)	Patience Ntshingila	South Africa	13.24	
4	Eleonore Bailly	Ivory Coast	13.03	NR
5	Sokhna Safietou Kante	Senegal	13.00	
6	Sangone Kandji	Senegal	12.98	
7	Deborah Acquah	Ghana	12.70	
8	Cathrine Makaya	Zimbabwe	12.62	
9	Asmaa Hawala	Egypt	12.34	
10	Nyebolo Uguda	Ethiopia	12.28	
11	Sandra Tavares	Cape Verde	11.62	
	Zinzi Chabangu	South Africa	DNS	
