= 2014 African Championships in Athletics – Women's long jump =

The women's long jump event at the 2014 African Championships in Athletics was held on August 12 on Stade de Marrakech.

== Results ==
Rank	Athlete	Nationality	#1	#2	#3	#4	#5	#6	Result	Notes
1st place, gold medalist(s)	Ese Brume	Nigeria	6.34	6.50	6.44	–	6.36	–	6.50	
2nd place, silver medalist(s)	Chinazom Amadi	Nigeria	6.17	6.14	6.08	6.40w	6.19	6.18	6.40w	
3rd place, bronze medalist(s)	Joelle Mbumi Nkouindjin	Cameroon	6.20	6.25	x	6.18	6.10	6.18	6.25	
4	Marlyne Ngo Ngoa	Cameroon	6.07	5.88	x	6.23	6.24	6.24	6.24	
5	Roumeissa Belabiod	Algeria	x	6.17w	x	x	x	x	6.17w	
6	Elizabeth Dadzie	Ghana	5.93	6.14	–	–	5.92	5.69	6.14	
7	Carla Marais	South Africa	6.10	6.11	4.71	x	6.00	x	6.11	
8	Gladys Musyoki	Kenya	6.03	6.09	x	5.81	5.95	x	6.09	
9	Jihad Bakhechi	Morocco	5.65	5.94	5.79				5.94	
10	Jamaa Chnaik	Morocco	5.85	x	x				5.85	
11	Cecilia Bouele Bondo	Republic of the Congo	5.64	x	5.64				5.64	
12	Mariam Issifou	Benin	5.50	5.15	x				5.50	
13	Worokia Sanou	Burkina Faso	x	x	5.24				5.24	
14	Zeiba Zeine	Ethiopia	x	5.20	x				5.20	
