= 2008 African Championships in Athletics – Women's long jump =

The women's long jump event at the 2008 African Championships in Athletics was held at the Addis Ababa Stadium on May 2.

== Results ==
Rank	Athlete	Nationality	#1	#2	#3	#4	#5	#6	Result	Notes
1st place, gold medalist(s)	Janice Josephs	South Africa	6.44	6.61	6.39w	6.38	6.64	6.39	6.64	
2nd place, silver medalist(s)	Chinaza Amadi	Nigeria	5.98	6.08	6.23	6.21	6.17	6.31w	6.31w	
3rd place, bronze medalist(s)	Patricia Soman	Ivory Coast	6.08w	x	5.49	6.04	6.13	6.02	6.13	
4	Yah Soucko Koïta	Mali	5.91	5.98	6.06	6.08	5.90w	5.98	6.08	
5	Estelle Brou	Ivory Coast	6.06	x	5.69	5.73	5.82	5.87w	6.06	
6	Fatima Zahra Dkouk	Morocco	x	5.97	–	x	x	5.95	5.97	
7	Maty Salame	Senegal	x	5.63	5.96	–	5.80	5.85	5.96	
8	Yamina Hjaji	Morocco	x	5.95	5.78	x	5.95w	x	5.95	
9	Enas Gharib	Egypt	x	5.75	5.94				5.94	
10	Pamela Mouele-Mboussi	Republic of the Congo	x	x	5.88				5.88	NR
11	Otonye Iworima	Nigeria	5.45	5.83w	5.67				5.83w	
12	Kadidia Soura	Burkina Faso	5.42	x	5.78				5.78	
13	Fatou Tiyana	Gambia	5.15	5.18	5.68				5.68	
14	Nana Blakime	Togo	5.59	5.65	5.62				5.65	
15	Fetiya Kedir	Ethiopia	4.90	5.29	5.33				5.33	
16	Zeyba Zeyeni	Ethiopia	5.20	5.14	5.14				5.20	
17	Emebet Tilahun	Ethiopia	x	4.80	–				4.80	
	Céline Laporte	Seychelles							DNS	
