= Athletics at the 2017 Summer Universiade – Women's triple jump =

The women's triple jump event at the 2017 Summer Universiade was held on 25 and 27 August at the Taipei Municipal Stadium.

== Medalists ==
Gold	Silver	Bronze
Neele Eckhardt; Germany	Fu Luna; China	Māra Grīva; Latvia

== Results ==
=== Qualification ===
Qualification: 13.90 m (Q) or at least 12 best (q) qualified for the final.

Rank	Group	Athlete	Nationality	#1	#2	#3	Result	Notes
1	B	Neele Eckhardt	Germany	13.52	11.89	–	13.52	q
2	B	Mariya Ovchinnikova	Kazakhstan	13.35	x	12.96	13.35	q
3	A	Sibongile Ntshingila	South Africa	13.26	x	x	13.26	q
4	A	Ottavia Cestonaro	Italy	13.23	13.17	13.15	13.23	q
5	A	Fu Luna	China	13.21	12.74	13.21	13.21	q
6	B	Tähti Alver	Estonia	13.08	x	x	13.08	q
7	A	Santa Matule	Latvia	12.99	x	12.89	12.99	q
8	B	Nhayilla Rentería	Colombia	x	x	12.99	12.99	q
9	A	Tonyecia Burks	United States	12.63	12.94	12.42	12.94	q
10	A	Sangone Kandji	Senegal	12.87	12.76	x	12.87	q
11	B	Māra Grīva	Latvia	12.83	12.78	12.80	12.83	q
12	A	Cemre Bitgin	Turkey	12.48	12.73	12.10	12.73	q
13	B	Angela Mercurio	Canada	x	12.64	12.62	12.64	
14	B	Titose Chilume	Botswana	12.38	12.58	12.47	12.58	PB
15	A	Diana Zagainova	Lithuania	x	12.50	12.56	12.56	
16	B	Hung Pei-ning	Chinese Taipei	x	12.20	12.53	12.53	SB
17	B	Saša Babšek	Slovenia	x	x	12.43	12.43	
18	B	Kelly Kingwill	South Africa	x	12.35	x	12.35	
19	B	Felyn Dolloso	Philippines	x	x	12.25	12.25	
20	A	Siva Vijayakuma	India	12.20	x	x	12.20	
21	A	Daria OKonnel-Bronin	Estonia	12.20	x	x	12.14	
22	A	Thelma Fuentes	Guatemala	x	12.05	x	12.05	
23	A	Ketalakumbure Gedara	Sri Lanka	x	10.70	10.11	10.70	

=== Final ===
Official Video

Rank	Name	Nationality	#1	#2	#3	#4	#5	#6	Result	Notes
1st place, gold medalist(s)	Neele Eckhardt	Germany	13.62	x	13.40	12.56	13.91	13.57	13.91	
2nd place, silver medalist(s)	Fu Luna	China	13.53	13.21	12.87	13.50	13.59	13.58	13.59	PB
3rd place, bronze medalist(s)	Māra Grīva	Latvia	13.47	13.58	13.05	13.15	12.77	13.00	13.58	SB
4	Ottavia Cestonaro	Italy	x	12.94	13.15	x	13.51	13.16	13.51	
5	Mariya Ovchinnikova	Kazakhstan	13.34	13.05	12.83	13.39	13.28	12.86	13.39	
6	Sangone Kandji	Senegal	12.92	12.70	12.65	12.89	12.49	12.74	12.92	
7	Santa Matule	Latvia	12.82	12.87	x	x	12.91	x	12.91	
8	Tähti Alver	Estonia	12.49	12.87	x	12.34	x	12.81	12.87	
9	Nhayilla Rentería	Colombia	12.78	12.83	12.34				12.83	
10	Sibongile Ntshingila	South Africa	x	x	12.80				12.80	
11	Cemre Bitgin	Turkey	12.75	12.36	12.25				12.75	
12	Tonyecia Burks	United States	12.19	12.31	12.51				12.51	
