= Athletics at the 2014 Commonwealth Games – Women's triple jump =

Women's triple jump at the Commonwealth Games

The Women's triple jump at the 2014 Commonwealth Games, as part of the athletics programme, took place at Hampden Park on 28 and 29 July 2014.

== Records ==
World Record	15.50 m	Inessa Kravets	UKR	Gothenburg, Sweden	10 August 1995
Games Record	14.86 m	Ashia Hansen	ENG	Manchester, England	31 July 2002

== Results ==
=== Qualifying round ===
Rank	Group	Name	#1	#2	#3	Result	Notes
1	A	Kimberly Williams (JAM)	13.94			13.94	Q
2	A	Ayanna Alexander (TRI)	13.78			13.78	Q
3	A	Laura Samuel (ENG)	13.54			13.54	Q
4	B	Linda Leverton (AUS)	13.10	13.48		13.48	Q
5	A	Joelle Mbumi Nkouindjin (CMR)	13.29	13.40		13.40	Q/PB
6	A	Ellen Pettitt (AUS)	13.34	12.74	13.05	13.34	q
7	B	Yamilé Aldama (ENG)	13.29	x	–	13.29	q
8	B	Shanieka Thomas (JAM)	13.27	13.20	13.22	13.27	q
9	B	Thea LaFond (DMA)	x	13.13	13.15	13.15	q
10	B	Chioma Matthews (ENG)	12.90	13.14	13.04	13.14	q
11	B	Nadia Eke (GHA)	x	12.67	13.14	13.14	q/NR
12	A	Mathilde Boateng (GHA)	12.90	13.04	13.07	13.07	q
13	A	Tamara Myers (BAH)	x	12.25	12.87	12.87	
14	B	Eleftheria Christofi (CYP)	x	12.84	12.74	12.84	
15	A	Selloane Tsoaeli (LES)	12.53	12.50	12.23	12.53	
16	B	Lerato Sechele (LES)	x	12.18	12.33	12.33	
17	A	Rebecca Sare (MLT)	11.83	12.06	12.26	12.26	NR
18	B	Marie Ngono Zibi (CMR)	12.23	x	x	12.23	

=== Final ===
Rank	Name	#1	#2	#3	#4	#5	#6	Result	Notes
1st place, gold medalist(s)	Kimberly Williams (JAM)	14.11	x	13.86	x	x	14.21	14.21	
2nd place, silver medalist(s)	Laura Samuel (ENG)	13.73	14.09	x	x	x	13.98	14.09	PB
3rd place, bronze medalist(s)	Ayanna Alexander (TRI)	13.54	13.75	13.99	13.53	14.01	13.77	14.01	
4	Shanieka Thomas (JAM)	13.29	13.57	13.45	13.43	13.85	13.28	13.85	
5	Linda Leverton (AUS)	x	13.53	13.57	13.69	13.56	13.55	13.69	
6	Ellen Pettitt (AUS)	x	13.54	12.89	12.11	12.93	12.88	13.54	PB
7	Joelle Mbumi Nkouindjin (CMR)	13.39	13.48	12.78	x	13.22	12.75	13.48	PB
8	Chioma Matthews (ENG)	x	13.34	13.26	13.39	13.26	13.46	13.46	
9	Mathilde Boateng (GHA)	13.00	12.95	x				13.00	
10	Nadia Eke (GHA)	12.98	12.70	12.92				12.98	
11	Thea LaFond (DMA)	12.26	12.64	12.58				12.64	
	Yamile Aldama (ENG)							DNS	
