= Joëlle Mbumi Nkouindjin =

Cameroonian athlete

Personal information
- Born: 25 May 1986 (age 40) Yaoundé, Cameroon
- Height: 1.70 m (5 ft 7 in)
- Weight: 70 kg (154 lb)

Sport
- Sport: Track and field
- Events: Triple jump, long jump
Medal record
Women's athletics
Representing Cameroon
African Games
Gold medal – first place	2015 Brazzaville	Long jump
Gold medal – first place	2015 Brazzaville	Triple jump
African Championships
Gold medal – first place	2014 Marrakesh	Triple jump
Silver medal – second place	2016 Durban	Long jump
Silver medal – second place	2016 Durban	Triple jump
Bronze medal – third place	2014 Marrakesh	Long jump

Joëlle Sandrine Mbumi Nkouindjin (born 25 May 1986) is a Cameroonian athlete whose specialty is the triple jump. She competed at the 2015 World Championships in Beijing without qualifying for the final. She has personal bests of 14.16 metres in the triple jump (Yaoundé 2015) and 6.35 metres in the long jump (Yaoundé 2014).

== Competition record ==
Year	Competition	Venue	Position	Event	Notes
Representing Cameroon
2014	Commonwealth Games	Glasgow, United Kingdom	11th	Long jump	6.18 m
2014	Commonwealth Games	Glasgow, United Kingdom	7th	Triple jump	13.48 m
2014	African Championships	Marrakesh, Morocco	3rd	Long jump	6.25 m
2014	African Championships	Marrakesh, Morocco	1st	Triple jump	14.02 m
2015	World Championships	Beijing, China	26th (q)	Triple jump	13.06 m
2015	African Games	Brazzaville, Republic of the Congo	1st	Long jump	6.31 m
2015	African Games	Brazzaville, Republic of the Congo	1st	Triple jump	13.75 m
2016	African Championships	Durban, South Africa	2nd	Long jump	6.39 m (w)
2016	African Championships	Durban, South Africa	2nd	Triple jump	13.37 m
2016	Olympic Games	Rio de Janeiro, Brazil	36th (q)	Triple jump	13.11 m
2017	Islamic Solidarity Games	Baku, Azerbaijan	6th	Long jump	5.88 m
2017	Islamic Solidarity Games	Baku, Azerbaijan	2nd	Triple jump	12.84 m
2017	Jeux de la Francophonie	Abidjan, Ivory Coast	2nd	Long jump	6.34 m (w)
2017	Jeux de la Francophonie	Abidjan, Ivory Coast	2nd	Triple jump	13.58 m
2018	Commonwealth Games	Gold Coast, Australia	7th	Triple jump	13.45 m
2019	African Games	Rabat, Morocco	8th	Long jump	6.03 m
2019	African Games	Rabat, Morocco	8th	Triple jump	12.72 m
