= Lynique Beneke =

South African long jumper

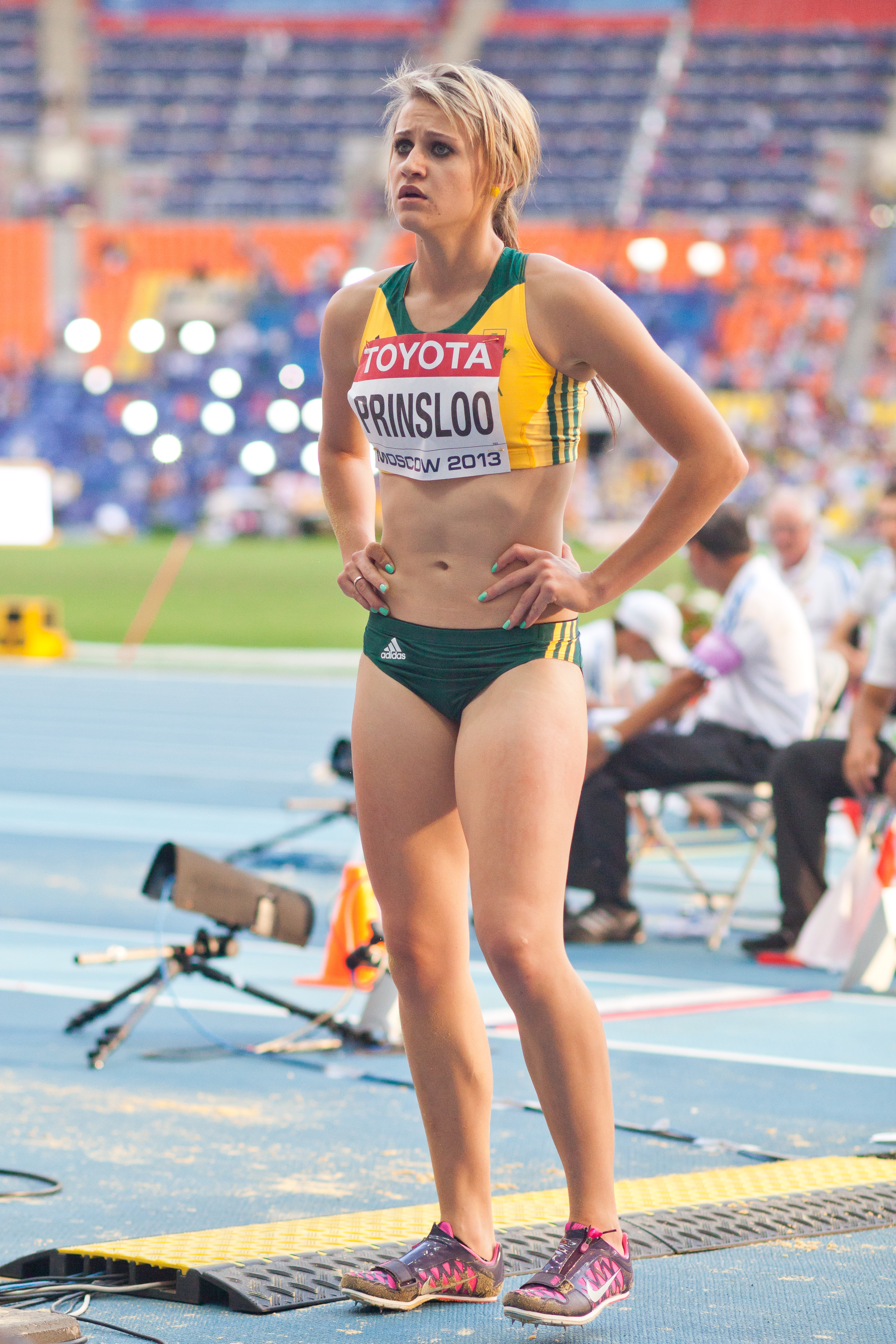
- Lynique Prinsloo at the 2013 World Championships

Personal information
- Born: Lynique Prinsloo; 30 March 1991 (age 35)
- Education: University of Johannesburg

Sport
- Sport: Athletics
- Event: Long jump
- Coached by: Emmarie Fouche
Medal record
Women's athletics
Representing South Africa
African Championships
Bronze medal – third place	2012 Porto-Novo	Long jump
Bronze medal – third place	2018 Asaba	Long jump

Lynique Beneke (née Prinsloo; born 30 March 1991) is a South African athlete specialising in the long jump. She represented her country at the 2013 World Championships.

Her personal best in the event is 7.8 metres (-1.2 m/s) set in Stellenbosch in 2013.

She is married to a South African hurdler, PC Beneke.

== International competitions ==
Year	Competition	Venue	Position	Event	Notes
Representing South Africa
2012	African Championships	Porto-Novo, Benin	3rd	Long jump	6.22 m
2013	World Championships	Moscow, Russia	27th (q)	Long jump	6.17 m
2016	African Games	Brazzaville, Republic of the Congo	5th	Long jump	6.13 m
2016	African Championships	Durban, South Africa	5th	Long jump	6.20 m
2016	Olympic Games	Rio de Janeiro, Brazil	(q)	Long jump	6.10 m
2017	Universiade	Taipei, Taiwan	6th	Long jump	6.21 m
2018	African Championships	Asaba, Nigeria	4th	4 × 100 m relay	45.63 s
2018	African Championships	Asaba, Nigeria	3rd	Long jump	6.38 m
2019	African Games	Rabat, Morocco	4th (h)	4 × 100 m relay	45.54 s
2019	African Games	Rabat, Morocco	3rd	Long jump	6.30 m
