= Josleidy Ribalta =

Cuban track and field athlete (born 1990)

Personal information
- Born: May 2, 1990 (age 36)

Sport
- Country: Cuba
- Sport: Athletics
- Event: Triple jump
- Updated on 15 August 2012

Josleidy Ribalta Alfonso (Spanish pronunciation: [xosˈlejði riˈβalta]; born 2 May 1990) is a Cuban track and field athlete who specialises in the triple jump. She has a personal best of 14.61 m for the event.

Born in Havana, she competed in the triple jump as a teenager, jumping 13.51 m in 2006 and improving to 13.72 m the following year. In her first international competition, she took the silver medal behind fellow Cuban Dailenys Alcántara at the 2007 World Youth Championships in Athletics. In the next season she set a new best of 13.87 m and was again runner-up to Alcántara on the world stage, this time at the 2008 World Junior Championships in Athletics. In her final year as a junior (under-19) athlete, she came fifth at the 2009 ALBA Games and cleared fourteen metres for the first time (reaching 14.10 m in Havana).

Ribalta came third at the 2010 Barrientos Memorial and was the runner-up at the Olimpiada del Deporte Cubano with a personal best clearance of 14.14 m. She also won a long jump bronze at the competition with a mark of 5.75 m. Her jump of 14.61 m in February 2011 ranked her eighth in the world that year and gained her qualification for the 2011 World Championships in Athletics, although she was replaced by Yarianna Martínez at the event. She had her first win at the Barrientos Memorial that year.

At the 2012 IAAF Centenary meet in Havana she cleared 14.30 m to finish second, ahead of two-time world champion Yargelis Savigne. She placed sixth at the New York Diamond League meet and was later selected for the Cuban Olympic team.
