= Patricia Soman =

Ivorian long jumper

Medal record

Women's athletics

Representing Ivory Coast

African Championships
Bronze medal – third place	2008 Addis Ababa	Long jump

Patricia Soman (born 12 August 1981) is a Côte d'Ivoire long jumper.

Soman was an All-American jumper for the Ball State Cardinals track and field team, finishing 8th in the long jump and triple jump at the 2003 NCAA Division I Indoor Track and Field Championships. She also won Mid-American Conference titles in both events despite undergoing major knee surgery earlier in her career.

On 16 February 2006, Soman married Ball State high jumper Adam Shunk.

== Achievements ==
Year	Competition	Venue	Position	Event	Notes
Representing Ivory Coast
2008	African Championships	Addis Ababa, Ethiopia	3rd	Long jump	6.13 m
2008	African Championships	Addis Ababa, Ethiopia	5th	4 × 100 m relay	46.64

=== Personal bests ===
- Long jump - 6.38 m (2003)
- Triple jump - 13.02 m (2003)
