= Boxing at the 2026 Commonwealth Games – Women's 57 kg =

Boxing competitions

Boxing – Women's 57 kg at the 2026 Commonwealth Games
- Venue: SEC Centre
- Dates: July 26 – 1 August 2026
- Competitors: 9 from 9 nations

Medalists
| gold medal | Jaismine Lamboria | India |
| silver medal | Michaela Walsh | Northern Ireland |
| bronze medal | Jasmine Daunakamakama | Fiji |
| bronze medal | Rapelang Maselele | Lesotho |

The Women's 57 kg boxing competitions at the 2026 Commonwealth Games in Glasgow, Scotland took place between July 26 and August 1 at the SEC Centre.

Like all Commonwealth boxing events, the competition was a straight single-elimination tournament. Both semifinal losers were awarded bronze medals, so no boxers competed again after their first loss. Bouts consisted of three rounds of three minutes each, with one-minute breaks between rounds.

== Schedule ==
The schedule was as follows:

| Date | Round |
|---|---|
| Sunday 26 July | Preliminaries |
| Wednesday 29 July | Quarter-finals |
| Friday 31 July | Semi-finals |
| Saturday 1 August | Final |

== Results ==
The draw was as follows:

=== Bracket ===
Round of 16
26 July
Jasmine Daunakamakama (FIJ) | 5
Adelaide Djabatey (GHA) | 0

Quarterfinals
29 July
Keshani Hansika (SRI) | 1
Jasmine Daunakamakama (FIJ) | 4
29 July
Lara Brown (SCO) | 0
Michaela Walsh (NIR) | 5
29 July
Elise Glynn (ENG) | 1
Jaismine Lamboria (IND) | 4
29 July
Zawadi Kutaka (TAN) | 1
Rapelang Maselele (LES) | 4

Semifinal
31 July
Jasmine Daunakamakama (FIJ) | 0
Michaela Walsh (NIR) | 5
31 July
Jaismine Lamboria (IND) | RSC
Rapelang Maselele (LES)

Gold medal match
1 August
Michaela Walsh (NIR) | 0
Jaismine Lamboria (IND) | 5
