= Boxing at the 2026 Commonwealth Games – Men's 65 kg =

Boxing competitions

Boxing – Men's 65 kg at the 2026 Commonwealth Games
- Venue: SEC Centre
- Dates: July 24 – 1 August 2026
- Competitors: 26 from 26 nations

Medalists
gold medal	Patris Mughalzai	England
silver medal	Jacob Cassar	Australia
bronze medal	Pooana Khoahli	Lesotho
bronze medal	Emmanuel Katema	Zambia

The men's 65 kg boxing competitions at the 2026 Commonwealth Games in Glasgow, Scotland took place between July 24 and August 1 at the SEC Centre.

Like all Commonwealth boxing events, the competition was a straight single-elimination tournament. Both semifinal losers were awarded bronze medals, so no boxers competed again after their first loss. Bouts consisted of three rounds of three minutes each, with one-minute breaks between rounds.

== Schedule ==
The schedule was as follows:

Date	Round
Friday 24 July	Preliminaries
Sunday 26 July	Preliminaries
Tuesday 28 July	Quarter-finals
Friday 31 July	Semi-finals
Saturday 1 August	Final

== Results ==
The draw was as follows:

=== Bracket ===
Preliminaries
Pooana Khoahli (LES)	5
De Niro Pao (NIU)	0
Ziggy Agathe (MRI)	RSC
Simamkele Damesi (RSA)
Rashield Williams (BAH)	2
James Paul (PNG)	3
Jovanie Bouzin (SEY)	0
Afzal Khan (PAK)	5
Connor Campbell (NZL)	RSC
Ben Maukakala (FIJ)
Abdulramon Abdulwahab (NGR)	0
Nuhu Batte (UGA)	5
Abdul Wahib Omar (GHA)	0
Patris Mughalzai (ENG)	5
Leo Church (SCO)	5
Vi-J Tebouwa (NRU)	0
Emmanuel Katema (ZAM)	KO
Chamil Pathmasiri (SRI)
Alston Ryan (ANT)
Elias Bonzo (MAW)	RSC

Preliminaries
Martez Cope (JAM)	0
Pooana Khoahli (LES)	5
Ziggy Agathe (MRI)	5
James Paul (PNG)	0
Gabriel Labrie (CAN)	5
Afzal Khan (PAK)	0
Connor Campbell (NZL)	0
Jacob Cassar (AUS)	5
Aditya Pratap Yadav (IND)	2
Nuhu Batte (UGA)	3
Patris Mughalzai (ENG)	5
John Paul Hale (NIR)	0
Leo Church (SCO)	0
Emmanuel Katema (ZAM)	4
Elias Bonzo (MAW)	5
Ewan Gracia (GIB)	0

Quarterfinals
Pooana Khoahli (LES)	5
Ziggy Agathe (MRI)	0
Gabriel Labrie (CAN)	2
Jacob Cassar (AUS)	3
Nuhu Batte (UGA)	0
Patris Mughalzai (ENG)	3
Emmanuel Katema (ZAM)	RSC
Elias Bonzo (MAW)

Semifinals
Pooana Khoahli (LES)	0
Jacob Cassar (AUS)	5
Patris Mughalzai (ENG)	4
Emmanuel Katema (ZAM)	1

Final
Jacob Cassar (AUS)	0
Patris Mughalzai (ENG)	5
