= Mickey McDonagh =

Welsh boxer (born 1998)

Personal information
- Born: 18 August 1998 (age 27) Swansea, Wales
- Height: 1.77 m (5 ft 9 1/2 in)
- Weight: 63 kg (139 lb; 9.9 st)

Boxing career
Medal record
Men's amateur boxing
Representing Wales
Commonwealth Games
Bronze medal – third place	2018 Gold Coast	Lightweight

Michael "Mickey" McDonagh (born 18 August 1998) is a British amateur boxer who is affiliated with Merlin's Bridge ABC. He won lightweight bronze in the 2018 Commonwealth Games.

McDonagh was selected to compete at the 2019 World Championships in Yekaterinburg, Russia, where he lost by split decision (4:0) to Thomas Blumenfeld in the first round.
