= Marlyne Sarah Ngongoa =

Cameroonian long jumper (born 1983)

Personal information
- Born: 7 July 1983 (age 42)

Sport
- Country: Cameroon
Medal record
Women's athletics
Representing Cameroon
African Championships
Bronze medal – third place	2016 Durban	Long jump

Marlyne Sarah Ngongoa (also written Ngo Ngoa, born 7 July 1983) is a Cameroonian long jumper.

She finished eighth at the 2012 African Championships, fourth at the 2014 African Championships, tenth at the 2014 Commonwealth Games, seventh at the 2015 Military World Games, sixth at the 2015 African Games, won the bronze medal at the 2016 African Championships. and finished sixth at the 2017 Jeux de la Francophonie. At the 2017 Islamic Solidarity Games she won bronze medals in both long jump and 4 x 100 metres relay.

Her personal best jump is 6.52 metres, achieved in the qualifying round at the 2014 Commonwealth Games in Glasgow.
