= Dailenys Alcántara =

Cuban track and field athlete (born 1991)

Personal information
- Full name: Dailenys Alcántara Pacheco
- Born: 10 August 1991 (age 34) Santiago de Cuba, Cuba
- Height: 1.63 m (5 ft 4 in)
- Weight: 56 kg (123 lb)

Sport
- Country: Cuba
- Sport: Athletics
- Event: Triple jump
Medal record
Representing Cuba
World Youth Championships
Gold medal – first place	2007 Ostrava	Triple jump
World Junior Championships
Gold medal – first place	2008 Bydgoszcz	Triple jump
Gold medal – first place	2010 Moncton	Triple jump
Bronze medal – third place	2008 Bydgoszcz	Long jump
Central American and Caribbean Games
Silver medal – second place	2014 Veracruz	Triple jump
- Updated on 8 January 2015

Dailenys Alcántara Pacheco (born 10 August 1991) is a Cuban track and field athlete who competes in the triple jump and occasionally the long jump. She was the 2007 World Youth champion then became the first person to win two straight triple jump title at the World Junior Championships in Athletics (2008 and 2010). She represented Cuba at the 2011 World Championships in Athletics.

== Career ==
Born in Santiago de Cuba, Alcántara's talent for track and field was identified at a young age. She competed in sprinting events and the high jump, but found most success in the triple jump, taking victories at the Cuban schools games in 2002 and 2004. A triple jump/long jump double followed at the 2006 ESPA high school championships. Her international debut came at the age of fifteen at the 2007 World Youth Championships in Athletics. She entered the competition as the world's leading youth athlete with her personal best of 14.21 m and claimed the triple jump title ahead of fellow Cuban Josleidy Ribalta. She also placed seventh in the long jump.

Despite being one of the younger entrants, Alcántara improved two personal bests at the 2008 World Junior Championships in Athletics, jumping 14.25 m to take the triple jump gold medal and 6.41 m to earn herself the long jump bronze medal. She began to establish herself nationally in 2009 by winning the long jump at the Barrientos Memorial and placing third in the triple jump with a Central American and Caribbean junior record of 14.36 m (beating Mabel Gay's former mark). That year she entered senior international events, winning the long jump at the 2009 ALBA Games and placing sixth at the 2009 Central American and Caribbean Championships in Athletics. She also won the triple jump at the 2009 Pan American Junior Athletics Championships.

She focused just on the triple jump from 2010 onwards. She won the Barrientos Memorial that year, setting a best of 14.34 m there. At the 2010 World Junior Championships in Athletics she became the first athlete to win back-to-back triple jump titles and was over 30 cm ahead of the competition. The following year she set a personal best of 14.56 m in Havana, then had podium finishes on the Brazilian Athletics Tour. She was one of four Cuban women to compete in the triple jump at the 2011 World Championships in Athletics, but on her major debut her mark of 13.78 m was not enough to reach the final. She defeated two-time world champion Yargelis Savigne at the 2012 IAAF Centenary meet in Havana with a personal best jump of 14.58 m. She came third at the adidas Grand Prix Diamond League meet in New York City in June and made her first Cuban Olympic team a month later.

== Personal bests ==
Outdoor

- Long jump: 6.41 m (wind: +1.9 m/s) – Bydgoszcz, Poland, 12 July 2008
- Triple jump: 14.58 m (wind: -1.4 m/s) – Havana, Cuba, 27 May 2012

Indoor

- Triple jump: 13.91 m – Madrid, Spain, 18 February 2012

== International competitions ==
Year	Competition	Venue	Position	Event	Notes
2007	World Youth Championships	Ostrava, Czech Republic	7th	Long jump	6.09 m (wind: +1.7 m/s)
2007	World Youth Championships	Ostrava, Czech Republic	1st	Triple jump	13.63 m (wind: +1.0 m/s)
2008	World Junior Championships	Bydgoszcz, Poland	3rd	Long jump	6.41 m (wind: -1.9 m/s)
2008	World Junior Championships	Bydgoszcz, Poland	1st	Triple jump	14.25 m (wind: -0.5 m/s)
2009	ALBA Games	Havana, Cuba	1st	Long jump	6.33 m (wind: +0.5 m/s)
2009	Central American and Caribbean Championships	Havana, Cuba	6th	Long jump	6.07 m (wind: +0.0 m/s)
2009	Pan American Junior Championships	Port of Spain, Trinidad and Tobago	1st	Triple jump	13.17 m (wind: +0.8 m/s)
2010	World Junior Championships	Moncton, Canada	1st	Triple jump	14.09 m (wind: +2.0 m/s)
2011	World Championships	Daegu, South Korea	23rd (q)	Triple jump	13.78 m (wind: -0.8 m/s)
2012	Olympic Games	London, United Kingdom	16th (q)	Triple jump	13.97 m (wind: +1.6 m/s)
2014	Pan American Sports Festival	Mexico City, Mexico	3rd	Triple jump	14.29 m A (wind: 0.8 m/s)
2014	Central American and Caribbean Games	Xalapa, Mexico	2nd	Triple jump	14.09 m A (wind: -0.3 m/s)
2015	Pan American Games	Toronto, Canada	5th	Triple jump	14.04 m (w)
2015	NACAC Championships	San José, Costa Rica	8th	Triple jump	13.45 m (w)
