= Athletics at the 2015 African Games – Women's triple jump =

The women's triple jump event at the 2015 African Games was held on 13 September.

== Results ==
Rank	Name	Nationality	#1	#2	#3	#4	#5	#6	Result	Notes
1st place, gold medalist(s)	Joëlle Mbumi Nkouindjin	Cameroon	13.54	12.71	13.11	13.36	13.46	13.75	13.75	
2nd place, silver medalist(s)	Ibrahim Blessing Ibukun	Nigeria	13.52	13.39	13.46	13.44	13.22	13.46	13.52	
3rd place, bronze medalist(s)	Nadia Eke	Ghana	13.16	13.40	13.35	13.28	13.08	13.03	13.40	NR
4	Matilde Boateng	Ghana	12.72	12.50	12.70	12.84	13.09	13.11	13.11	
5	Zinzi Chabangu	South Africa	12.64	11.97	12.77	13.00	12.24	12.85	13.00	
6	Hope Idhe	Nigeria	12.90	12.77	11.86	12.11	12.54	12.42	12.90	
7	Sokhna Safietou Kante	Senegal	12.70	12.44	12.47	12.76	12.80	12.80	12.80	
8	Patience Ntshingila	South Africa	x	12.37	12.59	x	12.77	12.71	12.77	
9	Leruto Sechele	Lesotho	x	12.54	12.42				12.54	
10	Nyebolo Uguda	Ethiopia	12.24	x	12.32				12.32	
	Priscillah Tabunda	Kenya							DNS	
