= Zinzi Chabangu =

South African triple jumper

Personal information
- Born: 28 September 1996 (age 29)

Sport
- Sport: Athletics
- Event: Triple jump
- Coached by: Neil Cornelius
Medal record
Women's athletics
Representing South Africa
African Championships
Silver medal – second place	2018 Asaba	Triple jump

Zinzi Elna Chabangu (born 28 September 1996) is a South African athlete specialising in the triple jump. She won a silver medal at the 2018 African Championships in Asaba with 13.59 metres and a bronze medal at the 2019 African Games with the same result. She's the South African record holder with a jump of 14.02m, this feet happened at Tuks Sports Athletics track March 2020.

== Competition record ==
Year	Competition	Venue	Position	Event	Notes
Representing South Africa
2013	World Youth Championships	Donetsk, Ukraine	–	Long jump	NM
2013	World Youth Championships	Donetsk, Ukraine	16th (q)	Triple jump	12.36 m
2014	World Junior Championships	Eugene, United States	19th (q)	Long jump	5.95 m
2014	World Junior Championships	Eugene, United States	22nd (q)	Triple jump	12.84 m
2015	African Junior Championships	Addis Ababa, Ethiopia	12th	Long jump	4.95 m
2015	African Junior Championships	Addis Ababa, Ethiopia	3rd	Triple jump	13.03 m
2015	Universiade	Gwangju, South Korea	17th (q)	Long jump	5.87 m
2015	Universiade	Gwangju, South Korea	20th (q)	Triple jump	12.78 m
2015	African Games	Brazzaville, Republic of the Congo	7th	Long jump	6.08 m
2015	African Games	Brazzaville, Republic of the Congo	5th	Triple jump	13.00 m
2018	African Championships	Asaba, Nigeria	4th	Long jump	6.14 m
2018	African Championships	Asaba, Nigeria	2nd	Triple jump	13.59 m
2019	Universiade	Naples, Italy	20th (q)	Long jump	5.97 m
2019	Universiade	Naples, Italy	7th	Triple jump	13.42 m
2019	African Games	Rabat, Morocco	4th	Long jump	6.15 m
2019	African Games	Rabat, Morocco	3rd	Triple jump	13.42 m
