= Adam Shunk =

American high jumper (born 1979)

Personal information
- Born: August 29, 1979 (age 46) Muncie, Indiana, United States

Sport
- Sport: Track and field
- Club: North Carolina Tar Heels; Ball State Cardinals
Medal record
Men's athletics
Representing the United States
NACAC Championships
Gold medal – first place	2007 San Salvador	High jump

Adam Shunk (born August 29, 1979) is an American high jumper.

Shunk earned a BA in psychology from the University of North Carolina in 2003 and attained a PhD in Educational Psychology/Neuropsychology at Ball State University. At the 2003 NCAA Division I Indoor Track and Field Championships, Shunk finished runner-up in the high jump behind Cal State Northridge's Jerrick Holmes. However, Holmes was later determined ineligible, making Shunk the NCAA champion.

He competed for the NIKE Indiana Invaders Track Team, before becoming a NIKE athlete. He finished sixth at the 2007 Pan American Games. He also competed at the 2006 World Indoor Championships without reaching the final. Shunk is also the 2006 USA Indoor Champion. He also went to Delta High School in Muncie, Indiana.

His personal best jump is 2.30 metres, achieved in May 2005 in Santo Domingo.

On February 16, 2006, Shunk married Ball State teammate and long jumper Patricia Soman.

Shunk now works as a neuropsychologist and sports psychologist in Duluth, Georgia.
