= 2016 African Championships in Athletics – Women's long jump =

The women's long jump event at the 2016 African Championships in Athletics was held on 24 June in Kings Park Stadium.

== Results ==
Rank	Athlete	Nationality	Result	Notes
1st place, gold medalist(s)	Ese Brume	Nigeria	6.57w	
2nd place, silver medalist(s)	Joëlle Mbumi Nkouindjin	Cameroon	6.39w	
3rd place, bronze medalist(s)	Sarah Ngongoa	Cameroon	6.34w	
4	Samantha Pretorius	South Africa	6.33	
5	Lynique Prinsloo	South Africa	6.20	
6	Maryke Brits	South Africa	6.12w	
7	Sangone Kandji	Senegal	6.00	
8	Priscilla Tabunda	Kenya	5.81	
9	Nyebolo Uguda	Ethiopia	5.57	
10	Asmaa Hawala	Egypt	5.51	
