= Chinaza Amadi =

Nigerian long jumper

Personal information
- Nationality: Nigeria
- Born: 12 September 1987 (age 38)

Sport
- Sport: Athletics
- Event: Long jump
Medal record
Women's athletics
Representing Nigeria
African Championships
Silver medal – second place	2008 Addis Ababa	Long jump
Silver medal – second place	2014 Marrakesh	Long jump
Bronze medal – third place	2006 Bambous	Long jump
- Updated on 27 August 2016

Chinazom Doris Amadi (born 12 September 1987) is a Nigerian long jumper.

She won the bronze medal at the 2006 African Championships. At the 2007 All-Africa Games she finished fourth, missing the bronze medal by a two centimetre margin. At the 2008 African Championships she won the silver medal.

Her personal best jump is 6.43 metres (21 feet 1 inch), achieved in May 2007 in Lagos.

She was the gold medallist in the long jump at the 2015 African Games, but was stripped of this title after failing a drug test for methenolone. She was banned for four years, until 15 September 2019.
