= Grace Anigbata =

Nigerian triple jumper (born 1998)

Personal information
- Nationality: Nigerian
- Born: 16 September 1998 (age 27)
- Height: 1.80 m (5 ft 11 in)
- Weight: 59 kg (130 lb)

Sport
- Country: Nigeria
- Sport: Athletics
- Event: Triple Jump

Achievements and titles
- Personal best: 14.02 m (Asaba 2018)
Medal record
Women's athletics
Representing Nigeria
African Championships
Gold medal – first place	2018 Asaba	Triple jump

Grace Chinonyelum Anigbata (born 16 September 1998) is a Nigerian track and field athlete who specialises in the triple jump. She competed at the 2019 African Games in the triple jump winning a gold medal. In 2016, Grace Anigbata became Nigeria's high jump champion at age 18, with a jump of 1.70 m.

In 2018, she won the triple-jump event of the African championships in Asaba.
