= Lesotho National Olympic Committee =

National Olympic Committee

- Country: Lesotho
- Code: LES
- Created: 1971
- Recognized: 1972
- Continental Association: ANOCA
- Headquarters: Maseru
- President: Ms Matlohang Moiloa-Ramoqopo
- Secretary General: Mr Morake Raleaka
- Website: lnoc.org.ls

The Lesotho National Olympic Committee (IOC code: LES) is the National Olympic Committee representing Lesotho. It was created in 1971 and officially recognised by the International Olympic Committee in 1972.

== Presidents of Committee ==
- 2009–present – Matlohang Moiloa-Ramoqopo

== See also ==
- Lesotho at the Olympics
- Lesotho at the Commonwealth Games
