= Lesotho at the 2002 Commonwealth Games =

Sporting event delegation

The flag used by Lesotho in 2002.

Lesotho competed in the 2002 Commonwealth games, marking the country's seventh time competing in the event. The nation did not repeat their performance in Kuala Lumpur 1998 where they won their first medal, a gold, but did win a shared bronze with England in boxing.

== Medals ==
	Gold	Silver	Bronze	Total
Lesotho	0	0	1	1

== Bronze ==
Boxing:

(bronze) Ezekiel Letuka Men's bantamweight division (54kg)
