= Lerato Sechele =

Lesotho triple jumper

Medal record

Women's athletics

Representing Lesotho

African Championships
Bronze medal – third place	2018 Asaba	Triple jump

Lerato Lydia Sechele (born 10 March 1994) is a Lesotho triple jumper.

== Career ==
As a junior Sechele won the silver medal at the 2011 African Junior Championships and the gold medal at the 2013 African Junior Championships. She also finished tenth at the 2011 All-Africa Games.

Sechele competed at the 2014 Commonwealth Games without reaching the final, and finished fourth at the 2018 Commonwealth Games.

Her personal best jump is 13.57 metres, achieved at the 2018 Commonwealth Games in Gold Coast. This is the current Lesotho record.
