= Disappearance of Tiffany Whitton =

Unsolved 2013 disappearance of 26-year-old American woman

Coordinates: 33.9464°N 84.5218°W

Tiffany Whitton
- Photo Whitton posted on her Facebook page shortly before her disappearance
- Born: Tiffany Michelle Whitton; January 30, 1987
- Disappeared: September 13, 2013 (aged 26); Marietta, Georgia, U.S.
- Status: Missing for 13 years, 2 months and 7 days
- Height: 5 ft 3 in (160 cm)
- Criminal charges: Use of drug-related items, theft by taking
- Criminal penalty: 4 1/2 months in prison
- Criminal status: On parole
- Children: 2
- Mother: Lisa Daniels

Early on the morning of September 13, 2013, Tiffany Whitton (born January 30, 1987) of Powder Springs, Georgia, United States, was observed apparently shoplifting by loss prevention officers at a Walmart in nearby Marietta. They gathered to confront her at the store's exit, but after a brief struggle, she broke free and fled. She has not been seen since.

At the time, Whitton, who had a criminal record, was jobless, addicted to heroin and crystal methamphetamine, and in a difficult relationship with her boyfriend, Ashley Caudle, who was at the Walmart with her. Caudle noted her failure to return that night, going to a nearby restaurant where she had previously worked to look for her, but did not contact the police or her family. Whitton's mother, who was used to her frequent and sometimes lengthy unexplained absences, went to the police in January 2014.

The investigation is continuing, but while police say new leads come regularly, none of them have proven useful. Due to Caudle's criminal history, false statements about events that night he made later, and his failure to inform authorities or Whitton's family when he was unable to locate her, he is considered a person of interest. Currently serving a lengthy prison sentence for drug and gun charges, he denies any involvement in Whitton's disappearance or knowledge of her whereabouts.

In 2016, journalist Tom Junod wrote an article about Whitton's disappearance in Esquire, seeing the media silence on the case as an exception to what is called missing white woman syndrome. While Whitton is white, her troubled past and criminal record made her a less attractive subject to report on, he noted; her mother complained that some television shows that devote airtime to these cases had told her they were not interested in her daughter's disappearance. Junod also reported that Whitton's half-brother Blake said he received a phone call from her in January 2014, almost four months after she was last seen.

== Background ==
Tiffany Whitton was born to Lisa Daniels in 1987; she and Whitton's father divorced soon afterwards. Daniels recalls her as "happy-go-lucky" and "rambunctious" during her early childhood in Kennesaw, Georgia, a western suburb of Atlanta, but she also saw signs of her daughter's later issues. When Whitton was two, Daniels told Esquire in 2016, "I'd find things in her toy box that didn't belong to her." Her daughter said that someone at day care had given her the toys; Daniels stated her daughter became a more accomplished liar as she got older.

As she reached adulthood, Whitton grew more rebellious. She dropped out of high school during her sophomore year, putting an end to early ambitions of becoming a veterinarian. Whitton relinquished for adoption a child from a teenage pregnancy and would later say that she was permanently affected by the experience. By 2008, she had had another child, a daughter, and started using drugs. She became addicted first to OxyContin and was caught shoplifting a pair of flip-flops from a local Walmart. Intermittently, she worked as a waitress or bartender; on Facebook she described herself as a Hooters waitress living in Kennesaw.

In March 2011, Whitton, then living in the North Georgia town of Dalton, along with several others, was arrested and charged after a home invasion. She told police that the victim had stolen $60 from her earlier that evening and she was merely trying to get it back; investigators, however, suspected it had been payment for drugs that the victim purportedly failed to deliver. Whitton was sentenced to a short prison term in late 2012. Daniels practiced tough love, raising her granddaughter and telling Whitton she could not talk to her again until she overcame her addictions and turned her life around. Whitton's grandmother, Anita Boyette, remained in touch, picking her up when she was released. Whitton entered a drug rehabilitation facility shortly afterwards.

After her release, Whitton was able to stay off drugs and get a job waiting tables at an International House of Pancakes (IHOP) restaurant in Marietta. After one relationship ended due to her infidelity, and a roommate, Sheila Fuller, kicked her out for stealing, Whitton met Ashley "Red" Caudle, who was raising a young daughter on his own. The two began using crystal methamphetamine together; Whitton, however, also became addicted to heroin. Caudle, who told Esquire he does not use heroin, was unaware she had been using it until one morning when she told him while suffering withdrawal.

Caudle and Whitton's relationship was, their friends said, characterized by frequent arguments. Police were called to one particularly loud dispute when the couple lived at a motel; no arrests were made. When they moved to a trailer park, their fights continued, and were so frequent and so loud that they were evicted.

Whitton's addictions seriously hampered her job performance. She often showed up for her shifts at the restaurant high; sometimes fresh needle marks were apparent on her arms and she was sent home. In early August, after security camera footage showed that Whitton had been stealing items, IHOP let her go. Daniels, as a result, ceased all contact with her daughter. Boyette stayed in touch, and on September 8, let Whitton, Caudle and his daughter come over to her house to do laundry. She was the only member of Whitton's family ever to meet her boyfriend, and the last one who saw Whitton before her disappearance.

== Disappearance ==
By the end of August 2013, Whitton and Caudle were living with his daughter in a house in Powder Springs. On the night of September 12, they went to the house of a friend, Stephen Weinstein, and took drugs. Shortly after midnight on September 13, they took a borrowed truck and went to the Walmart store on U.S. Route 41 in Marietta, near her former employer. They arrived at 1 a.m. and began shopping.

Loss prevention officers in the store watched on security cameras as Whitton and Caudle walked around the store with a cart for most of the next hour. Whitton, who was in nearly continuous motion even when she was not looking at merchandise, seemed to them to be high. She continually took clothes off the shelves and replaced them, following a few steps behind Caudle, who eventually picked out some clothes for his daughter and a portable speaker. At the same time, the observers came to believe that Whitton was concealing some clothes she meant to shoplift, something she did often at that Walmart.

At 2 a.m., Whitton wanted to continue the trip, but Caudle, in his account, told her he needed to be somewhere else, after which she angrily began heading for the cash registers while verbally acquiescing. After Caudle paid for his items with some bills from a large roll of cash he was carrying, she abandoned the cart and the two began to leave the store. At the exit, loss prevention officers confronted Whitton on suspicion of carrying $20 worth of stolen clothing; one grabbed the strap of her handbag to detain her. Caudle stopped at the door, facing forward; on video footage from the store's cameras she appears to call to Caudle but without a response.

Whitton let go of her handbag, kicked off the flip-flops she was wearing, and ran out the exit. Neither Caudle nor the Walmart employees pursued her. She has not been seen since.

== Aftermath ==
The video of the incident shows the loss prevention officers waiting at the door, expecting Whitton to return, as she had left her footwear and bag behind. Caudle, who had watched Whitton's apprehension passively from the door, is seen talking to her. Later, however, he told people he had gone to the truck, where he was charging his phone, gotten a weapon—a gun or a knife, in different accounts—and confronted the loss prevention officers, who let her go, whereupon she escaped out the door. He explained in 2016 that he had told those stories only to impress the people he was telling them to, Weinstein and a woman who visited him in prison.

Caudle says that shortly after Whitton fled the store, he went out into the parking lot to look for her. He did not enter the truck, since he knew it had drugs in it and was afraid of arrest if he went in. He looked around the nearby stores, and sometime later, ended up at the IHOP where Whitton had worked until a month earlier. Sheila Fuller, Whitton's former roommate, recalls encountering Caudle sitting on a bench outside the restaurant sometime after 2 a.m.

Fuller had not seen Whitton either and told Caudle to call her phone and find her. He said he had been charging her phone and showed it to Fuller. She questioned how he was looking for her by just sitting in front of IHOP; he answered that some friends were coming to pick him up shortly. An hour and a half later, Weinstein, accompanied by two women, pulled up and Caudle left with him.

Weinstein says that Caudle, whom he describes as "full of shit and a piece of shit", but nonetheless pleasant company, told him about Whitton's absence, including how he had threatened the security guards at Walmart with a gun to get them to free her, which he doubted. However, he believed Caudle when he said he did not want to go back to his truck because of the drugs in it, and that he genuinely did not know where Whitton was. After returning to Weinstein's house, the two and another friend, he says, drove around the area looking for Whitton, who Caudle believed would eventually return to Weinstein's house. "I felt that he was telling the truth, other than the lying part", Weinstein said.

The next morning Caudle drove back to the Powder Springs house where he, Whitton and his daughter lived. He spent the next several days trying to find her—calling old boyfriends of hers, hospitals and jails in the area, calls verified by phone records. Two weeks later, he told his own probation officer that he had not been able to locate Whitton since that night, which records of the meeting confirm. Caudle also cleaned the truck, which later investigators took note of, but he insists he did that regularly due to the drug-related waste, such as used and discarded paraphernalia, left in it.

== Investigation ==
Caudle, and later Whitton's mother, made some efforts to locate Whitton on their own in the months after September 13, believing she was alive and might eventually return, as she had after dropping out of sight in the past. In January 2014, after Whitton had not made any contact with Lisa Daniels or anyone else in the family, to her knowledge, she informed the police.

=== By Caudle and Daniels ===
Caudle did not inform Whitton's family of her disappearance, nor did he report it to the police. Lisa Daniels, who had not heard from her daughter since breaking off communications in August, was used to Whitton's long absences and expected she would hear from her eventually. In November a demand letter from a lawyer for Walmart seeking $150 in restitution for the items Whitton had apparently stolen the night of her disappearance arrived at her grandmother's house, which Whitton used as her mailing address since she moved so frequently. It was not the first time such a letter had been sent to her, but Boyette believed something might be amiss this time.

Boyette knew too that Whitton often went on long drug binges, and that since she had been apprehended for shoplifting while still on parole from the 2011 charges, she was probably also trying to lower her profile for a time. Nevertheless, she called Caudle and learned not only of the September 13 incident that had prompted the letter but that he, too, had not seen Whitton since then.

Boyette informed Daniels, who looked at her daughter's Facebook page for clues as to her whereabouts and possible activity. Normally very active on social media, Whitton had abruptly stopped posting on September 1. Messages from other friends and acquaintances since then indicated that they, too, had not heard from her and expressed concern. "Before she could become a body, Tiffany became a ghost," Esquire's Tom Junod wrote, alluding to her family's fears she might end up dead.

Daniels called Caudle before Thanksgiving; he told her of his calls to jails and hospitals in the days after Whitton disappeared. Daniels believed that perhaps, with the approaching winter holidays, her daughter would at least call her family. However, she did not, and in January 2014, Daniels and Boyette reported Whitton missing to the Marietta police.

=== By police ===
The initial detective who handled the case, according to Daniels, appeared not to take much interest in it. As she had feared, he cited Whitton's troubled past, telling Daniels that the case would likely be closed when her daughter either returned of her own volition or got arrested somewhere else. At the end of the month, it was reassigned to another detective, Jonnie Moeller, who said later that she understood from her first conversation with Daniels that Whitton's case was not so typical.

Moeller believed Whitton was probably dead, but the delay in reporting the case to police had made it difficult to mount an effective investigation. "It was already a cold case when it came to us" she told Esquire. After talking to Walmart, which had preserved the video as evidence in a possible prosecution or civil suit, and to Caudle, she came to believe he had been involved in Whitton's disappearance.

In March, as a result of Moeller's investigation, a multi-jurisdictional drug-enforcement task force raided the Powder Springs house that had been Whitton's last known residence. The officers found marijuana, meth, and guns, amid an interior filled with dog feces and used needles. Eight people, including Caudle, were arrested on charges stemming from possessing those items; his daughter and another child were placed in the temporary custody of the local social services agency.

Many of the other residents of the house besides Caudle had known Tiffany; Moeller believed that if Caudle did not know or would not tell police anything, others might. As a result of information developed from that raid, the same group of officers executed a search warrant in July 2014 on Caudle's mother's house in Marietta. Despite extensive excavation and searches with cadaver dogs, they found nothing that provided them with any leads.

In 2015, Caudle pleaded guilty in Cherokee County to charges of possession of methamphetamine with intent to distribute and possessing a firearm while a convicted felon. He was sentenced to 10–20 years in prison, a minimum he was told by the judge resulted from a belief that he was not cooperating fully in the Whitton investigation. As of July 2022 he is serving his sentence at the Muscogee County Correctional Institute in Columbus, Georgia.

== Later developments ==
In mid-2015, the case was transferred to a third detective when Moeller, distressed over her inability to close the case, left the detective bureau to teach at the city's police academy. Her replacement, Mike Freer, managed to get what seemed to be a major break in the case later in the year when the Cobb County district attorney said a meth trafficker he had been prosecuting had heard from some of his friends that sometime after Tiffany disappeared, Caudle and some friends had driven up to Lake Allatoona north of the Atlanta area and thrown a concrete-filled barrel off the Bethany Bridge. The informant described damage to the bridge that matched what Freer found when he visited it.

The Georgia Department of Natural Resources brought in sonar and found a large object under 40 feet (12 m) of water below the bridge damage. When state patrol divers went down to look, however, the object turned out to be a large chunk of concrete from the bridge's construction. This is to date the last official attempt to find Whitton, and in 2016, Marietta turned the case over to the county's new cold case squad.

=== Esquire story ===
In April 2016, Esquire magazine published an article about Whitton's disappearance. Reporter Tom Junod was interested in the cases of women who do not trigger what has sometimes been called "missing white woman syndrome", where the media devotes excessive coverage to their cases. Even though the women are white, Junod believes they are ignored due to their troubled backgrounds. "[M]edia outlets ... tend to prefer women who are white, pretty, and, above all, innocent", Junod wrote.

He chose Whitton's case from 13 stories of similar women he was aware of, all of whom had gone missing over a three-year period with only three of them found—and all of those dead. Daniels told him she had tried to interest the producers of some shows that devoted segments to missing persons cases in covering her daughter's disappearance, and they told her they were not interested. She likened the process to an audition.

In addition to Daniels, Junod interviewed Boyette, Caudle, Fuller, Weinstein, and all the detectives who had investigated the case. He not only noted Caudle's lies about pulling a weapon when Tiffany was confronted by the loss prevention officers but caught him in another one: he said he called Tiffany's phone shortly after she disappeared, yet according to his first account he had it on his person, since it had been left behind in her handbag when she fled the Walmart. Fuller corroborated the claim as he had shown it to her after she suggested he call Whitton when they met outside the IHOP; Caudle's phone records do not show a call to Whitton's phone either.

The phone led to another revelation, however. According to Whitton's half-brother Blake, she wished him a happy birthday on Facebook five days after he had celebrated the occasion, which Daniels dismisses as proof that Caudle was using Whitton's phone to create the impression she was still alive. But Blake told Junod she called him as well.

Blake recalled that it came via an app "with a weird return number". He had almost let it go unanswered. He was positive it was his half-sister since she even called him by a childhood nickname. While Junod believed that Blake was not lying, he was not sure that Blake was accurate in his recollection, possibly confusing the time of the Facebook message with an earlier phone conversation. The Cobb County district attorney said it would try to obtain Blake's phone records.

== Theories ==
Daniels has long believed Whitton is dead and Caudle is responsible, due to his failure to let her or the police know of her disappearance. "He knows what happened to her and he knows where she is", she told The Atlanta Journal–Constitution in 2017. "Of that I have no doubt."

Daniels was further convinced when she viewed a recording of a prison videophone conversation Caudle had with a female visitor. In it he waves around a copy of Whitton's missing-person flyer that Moeller had brought to him and holds it up to the camera, all the while speaking confidently, unlike the way Junod recalled him. "They think I killed that bitch for real!" he says, and then laughs. After her prison interview, Moeller told Junod that she, too, had no doubt that he had. Investigators consider him a suspect.

In Daniels' theory, Whitton would have gone straight for Caudle's truck, after which "[e]ither they had a fight and he killed her, or she overdosed and he did nothing." However, the district attorney's office says the case does not fit the typical pattern of a death by drug overdose, since most victims do not disappear afterwards.

Attempts to fix blame on Caudle are complicated, however, by the short time between when he left Walmart shortly after Whitton did, and when Fuller saw him on the bench outside the IHOP. For him to have killed Whitton, either deliberately or accidentally, and then hidden her body so well in that brief span of time that no sign of it has ever turned up, would require "sadistic efficiency and nearly miraculous competence", Junod wrote. Daniels also believes her daughter would have vigorously resisted had someone attempted to kill her. While Caudle says cameras at several stores in the area would have recorded his passage across US 41 to the restaurant, no footage showing it has been found.

"She just ran. I don't know what happened to her", Caudle told Junod, who notes the irony that the person widely suspected of killing Whitton is the only one who believes she is still alive. He admitted that the couple argued, often vehemently, but that those arguments never became violent. If he is guilty of anything, Caudle said, it is not a crime but failure to look after Whitton properly.

If foul play did befall Whitton, Caudle has a suspect of his own: a former boyfriend of hers who also was a heavy meth user. He notes that after he and Weinstein returned to the latter's house in the morning after they had looked for Whitton and taken more drugs, the friend stayed out in the parking lot. In December 2013, the man, having an apparent psychotic episode, kicked down the door of a neighboring house at 4 a.m., insisting that he was being chased by armed men bent on exacting revenge on him for something they believed he had done to a woman, until he was taken away by the police.

== See also ==
- Disappearance of Brian Shaffer – 2006 disappearance of 27-year-old medical student
- Disappearance of Steven Koecher – Unsolved 2009 missing person case
- Disappearance of Rebecca Coriam – 2011 disappearance from cruise ship
- Disappearance of Andrew Gosden, British teenager last seen leaving a train station on surveillance footage
- Disappearance of Lars Mittank, German man also last seen on security camera footage running out of a building
- Disappearance of Sneha Anne Philip, officially a victim of the September 11 attacks last seen on department-store security camera footage shopping the night before.
- List of people who disappeared mysteriously: post-1970
