= List of Ghanaian records in athletics =

The following are the national records in athletics in Ghana maintained by Ghana's national athletics federation: Ghana Athletics Association (GAA).

== Outdoor ==
Key to tables: Awaiting ratification Record not kept by GAA Not ratified or later rescinded by GAA

=== Men ===
| Event | Record | Athlete | Date | Meet | Place | Ref. |
|---|---|---|---|---|---|---|
| 100 y | 9.40 NWI | Kofi Okyir | 12 April 1974 | | Austin, United States | |
| 100 m | 9.84 (+1.5 m/s) | Abdul-Rasheed Saminu | 19 July 2025 | Last Chance Qualifier | Powder Springs | |
| 200 m | 19.79 (+1.3 m/s) | James Dadzie | 29 April 2023 | Corky/Crofoot Shootout | Lubbock, United States | |
| 400 m | 45.13 | Ibrahim Hassan | 21 April 1996 | Mt. SAC Relays | Walnut, United States | |
| 600 m | 1:15.88 | Alex Amankwah | 30 April 2022 | Penn Relays | Philadelphia, United States | |
| 800 m | 1:44.71 | Alex Amankwah | 12 August 2024 | DMV Summer Invite | Fairfax, United States | |
| 1500 m | 3:40.23 | Sampson Laari | 2 June 2018 | | Nashville, United States | |
| Mile | 4:00.34 | Sampson Laari | 22 May 2018 | | Atlanta, United States | |
| 3000 m | 8:26.68 | Prosper Goku | 6 July 2012 | | Kumasi, Ghana | |
| 5000 m | 13:30.99 | William Amponsah | 27 March 2025 | Raleigh Relays | Raleigh, United States | |
| 5 km (road) | 14:25+ | William Amponsah | 11 September 2022 | Great North Run | Newcastle, United Kingdom | |
| 10,000 m | 29:53.78 | William Amponsah | 10 January 2020 | | Accra, Ghana | |
| 10,000 m | 29:50.99 | William Amponsah | 19 March 2024 | African Games | Accra, Ghana | |
| 10,000 m | 29:07.39 | Godwin Adukpo | 11 June 2016 | National Circuit Championships | Cape Coast, Ghana | |
| 10 km (road) | 18:31+ | William Amponsah | 11 September 2022 | Great North Run | Newcastle, United Kingdom | |
| 15 km (road) | 44:40+ | William Amponsah | 11 September 2022 | Great North Run | Newcastle, United Kingdom | |
| 10 miles (road) | 48:01+ | William Amponsah | 11 September 2022 | Great North Run | Newcastle, United Kingdom | |
| Half marathon | 1:03:15 | William Amponsah | 11 September 2022 | Great North Run | Newcastle, United Kingdom | |
| Marathon | 2:18:43 | Emanuel Amoo | 11 November 1990 | | Lagos, Nigeria | |
| 110 m hurdles | 13.59 (+2.0 m/s) | Yakubu Ibrahim | 27 June 2021 | | Jacksonville, United States | |
| 400 m hurdles | 50.40 | Keith Nkrumah | 5 May 2012 | MEAC Championships | Greensboro, United States | |
| 3000 m steeplechase | 8:57.54 | Robert Hackman | 1 September 1972 | Olympic Games | Munich, West Germany | |
| High jump | 2.24 m | Kwaku Boateng | 8 August 1996 | | Kitchener, Canada | |
| Pole vault | 5.40 m | Jordan Yamoah | 25 May 2013 | NCAA Division II Championships | Pueblo, United States | |
| Pole vault | 5.40 m | Jordan Yamoah | 9 April 2016 | ASU David Noble Relays | San Angelo, United States | |
| Long jump | 8.43 m (−0.2 m/s) | Ignisious Gaisah | 14 July 2006 | Golden Gala | Rome, Italy | |
| Triple jump | 17.23 m (−0.5 m/s) | Andrew Owusu | 19 August 1998 | African Championships | Dakar, Senegal | |
| Shot put | 17.97 m | Kwabena Keene | 20 April 2012 | ACC Championships | Charlottesville, United States | |
| Discus throw | 52.98 m | Kwabena Keene | 15 April 2010 | ACC Championships | Clemson, United States | |
| Discus throw | 55.22 m | Bugase Rexford | 18 May 2023 | Ghanaian Open Championships | Kumasi, Ghana | |
| Hammer throw | 50.56 m | David Dadzie | 20 May 2016 | Great Lakes Elite Meet | Ohio, United States | |
| Javelin throw | 83.09 m | John Ampomah | 8 July 2016 | Soga-Nana Memorial | Cape Coast, Ghana | |
| Decathlon | 7811 pts | Atsu Nyamadi | 21–22 April 2017 | Virginia Challenge | Charlottesville, United States | |
| Decathlon | 100m (wind) / Long jump (wind) / Shot put / High jump / 400m / 110m H (wind) / Discus / Pole vault / Javelin / 1500m; 11.24 (+1.2 m/s) / 7.62 m (+1.7 m/s) / 13.71 m / 1.93 m / 50.49 / 14.71 (+1.9 m/s) / 45.76 m / 4.40 m / 59.54 m / 4:42.51 | | | | | |
| 20 km walk (road) | 1:32:54 (Note: doubtful distance) | Ahmed Tijani Sanni | 29 April 2006 | | Cape Coast, Ghana | |
| 50 km walk (road) | 4:42:15 (Note: doubtful distance) | Kofi Ali | 29 April 2006 | | Cape Coast, Ghana | |
| 4 × 100 m relay | 37.79 | Ghana; Ibrahim Fuseini; Benjamin Azamati; Joseph Amoah; Abdul-Rasheed Saminu | 20 September 2025 | World Championships | Tokyo, Japan | |
| 4 × 400 m relay | 3:04.76 | Ghana; George Effah; Daniel Gyasi; Kwadwo Acheampong; Emmanuel Dasor | 24 July 2015 | Warri Relays | Warri, Nigeria | |

=== Women ===
| Event | Record | Athlete | Date | Meet | Place | Ref. |
|---|---|---|---|---|---|---|
| 100 m | 11.14 (±0.0 m/s) | Vida Anim | 20 August 2004 | Olympic Games | Athens, Greece | |
| 200 m | 22.67 (+0.9 m/s) | Janet Amponsah | 21 April 2018 | War Eagle Invitational | Auburn, United States | |
| 400 m | 51.82 | Akua Obeng-Akrofi | 25 May 2018 | NCAA East Preliminary Round | Tampa, United States | |
| 800 m | 1:59.60 | Akosua Serwaa | 2 July 2004 | Golden Gala | Rome, Italy | |
| 1500 m | 4:17.75 | Agnes Abu | 21 April 2017 | War Eagle Invitational | Auburn, United States | |
| 3000 m | 9:31.97 | Lydia Mato | 9 May 2015 | Nebraska Invitational | Lincoln, United States | |
| 5000 m | 16:31.8 h | Millicent Boadi | 30 July 1999 | | Kumasi, Ghana | |
| 10,000 m | 35:27.23 | Lydia Mato | 14 May 2015 | National Junior College Championships | Hutchinson, United States | |
| Half marathon | 1:16:30 | Millicent Boadi | 19 November 2005 | | Lagos, Nigeria | |
| Marathon | 2:42:12 | Sakat Lariba | 21 September 2015 | Accra Milo Marathon | Accra, Ghana | |
| 100 m hurdles | 13.02 (+1.8 m/s) | Vida Nsiah | 27 April 2001 | Penn Relays | Philadelphia, United States | |
| 100 m hurdles | 13.02 (−1.6 m/s) | Vida Nsiah | 28 April 2001 | Penn Relays | Philadelphia, United States | |
| 400 m hurdles | 59.13 | Ruky Abdulai | 4 June 2006 | | Abbotsford, ? | |
| 3000 m steeplechase | | | | | | |
| High jump | 1.97 m | Rose Yeboah | 8 June 2024 | NCAA Division I Championships | Eugene, United States | |
| Pole vault | 2.50 m (Note: record set during decathlon competition) | Margaret Simpson | 19 April 2007 | | Réduit, Mauritius | |
| Long jump | 6.89 m (+0.7 m/s) | Deborah Acquah | 2 April 2022 | Texas A&M vs Texas Dual | College Station, United States | |
| Long jump | 6.94 m (+1.8 m/s) | Deborah Acquah | 7 August 2022 | Commonwealth Games | Birmingham, United Kingdom | |
| Triple jump | 14.33 m (+0.8 m/s) | Nadia Eke | 8 June 2019 | | Kingston, Jamaica | |
| Shot put | 16.01 m | Claudia Ababio | 24 May 2018 | NCAA Division 1 East Preliminary Round | Tampa, United States | |
| Discus throw | 55.08 m | Claudia Ababio | 8 April 2017 | Virginia Quad | Charlottesville, United States | |
| Hammer throw | 61.95 m | Claudia Ababio | 20 April 2018 | Virginia Challenge | Charlottesville, United States | |
| Javelin throw | 56.36 m | Margaret Simpson | 7 August 2005 | World Championships | Helsinki, Finland | |
| Heptathlon | 6423 pts | Margaret Simpson | 28–29 May 2005 | Hypo-Meeting | Götzis, Austria | |
| Heptathlon | 100m H (wind) / High jump / Shot put / 200m (wind) / Long jump (wind) / Javelin / 800m; 13.41 (−0.8 m/s) / 1.85 m / 13.01 m / 24.55 (+1.0 m/s) / 6.32 m (+0.7 m/s) / 52.71 m / 2:21.71 | | | | | |
| Decathlon | 7014 pts h | Margaret Simpson | 18–19 April 2007 | | Réduit, Mauritius | |
| Decathlon | 100m (wind) / Long jump (wind) / Shot put / High jump / 400m / 100m H (wind) / Discus / Pole vault / Javelin / 1500m; 12.3h (NWI) / 5.73 m (NWI) / 12.42 m / 1.72 m / 1:02.2h / 14.0h (NWI) / 32.17 m / 2.50 m / 47.67 m / 5:41.7h | | | | | |
| 20 km walk (road) | 1:55:42 (Note: doubtful distance) | Jacqueline Ado Bludo | 29 April 2006 | | Cape Coast, Ghana | |
| 50 km walk (road) | | | | | | |
| 4 × 100 m relay | 42.67 | Ghana; Flings Owusu-Agyapong; Gemma Acheampong; Beatrice Gyaman; Janet Amponsah | 8 July 2016 | Soga-Nana Memorial | Cape Coast, Ghana | |
| 4 × 400 m relay | 3:35.55 | Ghana; Helena Opoku; Grace Bakari; Georgina Aidoo; Hannah Afriyie | 27 July 1978 | All-Africa Games | Algiers, Algeria | |

=== Mixed ===
| Event | Record | Athlete | Date | Meet | Place | Ref. |
|---|---|---|---|---|---|---|
| 4 × 400 m relay | 3:32.87 | Ghana | 21 May 2022 | | Ghana, South Africa | |
| 4 × 400 m relay | 3:23.36 | Ghana; Solomon Diafo; Grace Aduntira; Daniel Otibo; Bridget Annan | 19 March 2024 | African Games | Accra, Ghana | |

== Indoor ==
=== Men ===
| Event | Record | Athlete | Date | Meet | Place | Ref. |
|---|---|---|---|---|---|---|
| 50 m | 5.62+ | Eric Nkansah | 21 February 1999 | Meeting Pas de Calais | Liévin, France | |
| 55 m | 6.02 A | Leonard Myles-Mills | 22 February 1997 | | Colorado Springs, United States | |
| 60 m | 6.45 A | Leonard Myles-Mills | 20 February 1999 | | Colorado Springs, United States | |
| 200 m | 20.75 | Joseph Amoah | 1 February 2020 | Bruce Lehane Scarlet and White Invitational | Boston, United States | |
| 200 m | 20.57 | Joseph Amoah | 5 February 2022 | Bruce Lehane Scarlet & White Invitational | Boston, United States | |
| 200 m | 20.61 A OT | Leonard Myles-Mills | 20 February 1999 | | Colorado Springs, United States | |
| 400 m | 46.21 | Emmanuel Dasor | 25 February 2016 | Conference USA Championships | Birmingham, United States | |
| 500 m | 1:02.28 | Alex Amankwah | 12 January 2018 | Blazer Invite | Birmingham, United States | |
| 600 m | 1:14.90 | Alex Amankwah | 31 January 2025 | Penn State National Open | State College, United States | |
| 800 m | 1:45.82 | Alex Amankwah | 8 February 2025 | Millrose Games | New York City, United States | |
| 1500 m | 3:58.65 y (Note: by World Athletics source; 3:58.75 by other sources) | Sampson Laari | 26 February 2017 | BU Last Chance Meet | Boston, United States | |
| Mile | 3:58.65 (Note: by World Athletics source; 3:58.75 by other sources) | Sampson Laari | 26 February 2017 | BU Last Chance Meet | Boston, United States | |
| 3000 m | 8:22.23 | Sampson Laari | 19 February 2017 | | Birmingham, United States | |
| 3000 m | 8:05.88 OT | Sampson Laari | 13 January 2017 | Vanderbilt Commodore Invite | Nashville, United States | |
| 55 m hurdles | 7.48 | Yakubu Ibrahim | 11 December 2015 | | New Haven, United States | |
| 55 m hurdles | 7.48 | Yakubu Ibrahim | 22 January 2022 | | New Haven, United States | |
| 60 m hurdles | 7.85 | Keith Nkruma | 25 January 2013 | | Blacksburg, United States | |
| High jump | 2.08 m | Kingsley Adams | 3 March 1973 | | Kansas City, United States | |
| High jump | 2.20 m | Cadman Evans Yamoah | 11 February 2023 | Gorilla Classic | Pittsburg, United States | |
| Pole vault | 5.41 m (Note: outdoor mark ratified as absolute record) | Jordan Yamoah | 12 March 2016 | NCAA Division II Championships | Pittsburg, United States | |
| Long jump | 8.36 m | Ignisious Gaisah | 2 February 2006 | GE Galan | Stockholm, Sweden | |
| Triple jump | 16.91 m | Andrew Owusu | 24 January 1998 | | Lincoln, United States | |
| Shot put | 17.81 m | Kwabena Keene | 27 February 2010 | ACC Championships | Blacksburg, United States | |
| Heptathlon | 5567 pts | Atsu Nyamadi | 17–18 January 2019 | | Birmingham, United States | |
| Heptathlon | 60m / Long jump / Shot put / High jump / 60m H / Pole vault / 1000m; 7.28 / 7.18 m / 14.64 m / 1.93 m / 8.46 / 4.50 m / 2:47.85 | | | | | |
| 5000 m walk | | | | | | |
| 4 × 400 m relay | | | | | | |

=== Women ===
| Event | Record | Athlete | Date | Meet | Place | Ref. |
|---|---|---|---|---|---|---|
| 55 m | 7.03 | Gemma Acheampong | 5 February 2016 | Crimson Elite | Cambridge, United States | |
| 60 m | 7.18 | Vida Anim | 27 February 2004 | | Chemnitz, Germany | |
| 60 m | 7.18 | Flings Owusu-Agyapong | 16 January 2015 | Gotham Cup | New York City, United States | |
| 60 m | 7.18 | Gemma Acheampong | 22 February 2015 | Patriot League Championships | Annapolis, United States | |
| 60 m | 6.9 h | Alice Annum | 17 June 1975 | | Mainz, West Germany | |
| 200 m | 23.34 | Flings Owusu-Agyapong | 12 February 2016 | David Hemery Invitatonal | Boston, United States | |
| 300 m | 39.50 | Gemma Acheampong | 6 December 2014 | Boston University Opener | Boston, United States | |
| 400 m | 52.56 | Pearl Awanya | 9 February 2024 | Tyson Invitational | Fayetteville, United States | |
| 500 m | 1:11.48 | Akua Obeng-Akrofi | 2 February 2018 | Metropolitan Indoor Championships | New York City, United States | |
| 800 m | 2:02.30 | Agnes Abu | 25 February 2018 | Boston University Last Chance Qualifier | Boston, United States | |
| 1000 m | 2:58.42 A | Lydia Mato | 7 March 2015 | NJCAA Championships | Albuquerque, United States | |
| 1500 m | 4:43.34 y | Martha Bissah | 16 February 2019 | JDL DMR Invitational | Winston-Salem, United States | |
| Mile | 4:43.34 | Martha Bissah | 16 February 2019 | JDL DMR Invitational | Winston-Salem, United States | |
| 3000 m | 9:48.53 | Martha Bissah | 8 December 2019 | CNU Holiday Open | Newport News, United States | |
| 5000 m | 17:14.40 | Lydia Mato | 16 January 2015 | Holiday Inn Invite | Lincoln, United States | |
| 60 m hurdles | 8.03 | Vida Nsiah | 8 March 1997 | World Championships | Paris, France | |
| High jump | 1.83 m | Abigail Kwarteng | 14 January 2022 | Commodore Meet | Nashville, United States | |
| High jump | 1.85 m | Rose Amoanimaa Yeboah | 6 January 2024 | Illini Open | Campaign, United States | |
| High jump | 1.88 m | Rose Amoanimaa Yeboah | 26 January 2024 | Illini Challenge | Campaign, United States | |
| Pole vault | | | | | | |
| Long jump | 6.65 m | Deborah Acquah | 23 January 2021 | Aggie Invitational | College Station, United States | |
| Triple jump | 14.27 m | Deborah Acquah | 13 March 2021 | NCAA Division I Championships | Fayetteville, United States | |
| Shot put | 16.00 m | Claudia Ababio | 23 February 2018 | | Geneva, United States | |
| Weight throw | 19.59 m | Emelda Malm-Annan | 11 December 2015 | University of Wyoming Power Meet | Laramine, United States | |
| Pentathlon | 3758 pts | Elizabeth Dadzie | 17 February 2018 | Conference USA Championships | Birmingham, United States | |
| Pentathlon | 60m H / High jump / Shot put / Long jump / 800m; 8.80 / 1.59 m / 11.13 m / 5.65 m / 2:26.77 | | | | | |
| 3000 m walk | | | | | | |
| 4 × 400 m relay | | | | | | |
