= Disappearance of Brian Shaffer =

2006 disappearance of 27-year-old medical student

Coordinates: 39.99382°N 83.00657°W

Brian Shaffer
- (L) Shaffer before his disappearance; (R) age‑progressed image showing him at age 42.
- Born: Brian Randall Shaffer; February 11, 1979; Pickerington, Ohio, U.S.
- Disappeared: April 1, 2006 (aged 27); Columbus, Ohio, U.S.
- Status: Missing for 20 years, 6 months and 13 days
- Education: Ohio State University (BS)
- Occupation: Medical student
- Height: 6 ft 2 in (188 cm)
- Parents: Randy Shaffer (father); Renee Shaffer (mother)
- Relatives: Derek Shaffer (brother)

In the early hours of April 1, 2006, Brian Randall Shaffer, a 27‑year‑old medical student at the Ohio State University College of Medicine, disappeared in Columbus, Ohio, United States. He had spent the previous night, March 31, having drinks with friends at a campus‑area bar to mark the start of spring break. He later became separated from them, and they assumed he had gone home.

Security footage from outside the second‑floor entrance recorded Shaffer briefly speaking with two women just before 2 a.m. before walking out of frame. No video shows him exiting the building, and he has not been seen or heard from since. The case received national media attention.

Shaffer's disappearance has been especially puzzling to investigators because the bar had no other publicly accessible exits at the time, aside from a nearby service door. Columbus police have explored several theories. Some scrutiny has focused on a friend who was with Shaffer that night, although he was advised not to take polygraph tests. Other speculation has included a possible connection to the purported Smiley Face serial killer, but police rejected any link to the alleged killer, consistent with the FBI and other agencies. It has also been suggested that Shaffer might be alive and living elsewhere under a new identity.

== Background ==
Brian Randall Shaffer was born on February 11, 1979, and grew up in Pickerington, Ohio, a suburb of Columbus. He is the elder of Randy and Renee Shaffer's two sons. He graduated from the local high school in 1997 and later attended Ohio State University (OSU), completing a degree in microbiology six years later. In 2004, Shaffer began studies at the OSU College of Medicine. During his second year, in March 2006, his mother died of myelodysplasia. Friends said that although he appeared to cope, her death was difficult for him.

While in medical school, Shaffer became romantically involved with another student, Alexis Waggoner. Their families and friends believed he would likely propose to her later in 2006, possibly during a spring break trip to Miami the couple had planned for early April. He was drawn to tropical locations and their relaxed lifestyles. Despite pursuing medicine, he told friends that his real ambition was to start a band playing music in the style of Jimmy Buffett.

== Disappearance ==
On March 31, 2006, classes at OSU ended for spring break, which began on a Friday night. Shaffer and his father, Randy, marked the occasion with a steak dinner earlier in the evening. Randy later said that Shaffer seemed exhausted after studying through the night earlier in the week while preparing for critical upcoming exams. He did not think Shaffer should go out with his friend, William "Clint" Florence, later that night as planned, but he did not share his concerns with his son.

At 9 p.m., Shaffer met Florence at the Ugly Tuna Saloona, a bar in the South Campus Gateway complex on High Street in Columbus. An hour later, Shaffer called Waggoner, who had returned to Toledo to visit her family before the couple's planned trip to Miami. Shaffer and Florence continued bar-hopping, visiting several other establishments and working their way down to the Arena District. According to Florence, they had one shot of hard liquor at each stop.

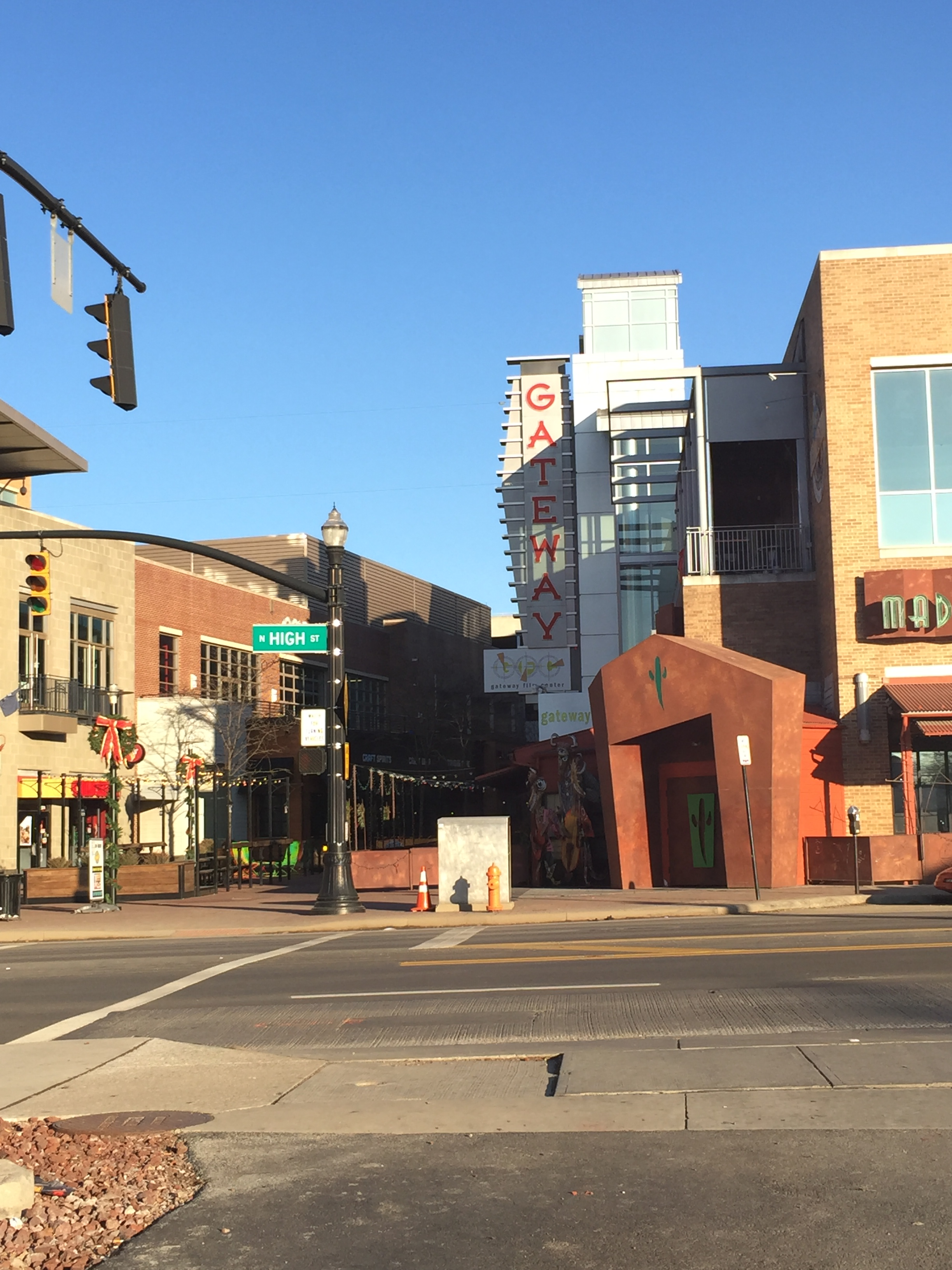
South Campus Gateway in 2015. The Ugly Tuna Saloona was located in the upper story of the building on the right.

After midnight, Shaffer and Florence met Meredith Reed, a friend of Florence, in The Short North. Reed drove them back to the Ugly Tuna Saloona, where they had started the night, and joined them for a final round. While they were there, Shaffer separated from the group. He was last seen on a security camera outside the bar just before 2 a.m.

Florence and Reed tried to find him, repeatedly calling his phone. They left with other patrons when the bar closed at 2 a.m., waiting outside for Shaffer. When he did not appear among the departing crowd, they assumed he had returned to his apartment without telling them. Waggoner and Shaffer's father tried calling him later that weekend, but he did not answer. On Monday morning, he missed the long‑scheduled flight to Miami. He was then reported missing to Columbus police.

== Investigation ==
Police began their search for Shaffer at the Ugly Tuna Saloona, the bar where he had last been seen. Since the area around South Campus Gateway had a high crime rate, the Gateway building, which housed the bar and other businesses, had installed security cameras. Footage showed Shaffer, Florence, and Reed going up an escalator to the bar's main entrance at 1:15 a.m. Shaffer was seen outside the bar around 1:55 a.m., talking briefly with two young women and saying goodbye before moving off-camera. The camera did not record him leaving when the bar closed shortly afterward. This was the last known time Shaffer was seen.

Investigators noted that Shaffer could have changed clothes inside the bar or put on a hat and kept his head down, avoiding the camera. He might also have left the building by another route. A service door, not generally used by the public, was a short distance from where he was last seen. It led to a first-floor hallway that, at the time, provided access to a construction area with its own exterior exit. Some officers believed it would have been difficult to walk through while sober, much less intoxicated, as Shaffer likely was. However, cameras in that area might also have missed him; one panned across the space constantly, and the other was operated manually.

Officers reviewed footage from cameras at other nearby bars to see if they could explain how Shaffer had left the Ugly Tuna Saloona. Footage from three establishments showed no trace of him.

The search expanded outward from the bar. Officers, sometimes accompanied by police dogs, looked closely along the street, inspected dumpsters and other waste containers, and asked residents if they had seen Shaffer. Flyers bearing his picture, showing a tattoo on his upper right arm of a stick-figure logo from the cover artwork for the single of "Alive" by Pearl Jam, one of his favorite bands, and noting a distinctive fleck in one of his irises, were posted widely. Police persuaded the city of Columbus to let them enter the sewer system and search there. No useful information was found. At Shaffer's apartment on King Avenue, six blocks from the bar, his car was still parked outside. Inside, nothing appeared amiss.

After searching miles in every direction from the Ugly Tuna Saloona, police began considering possibilities other than an accident or foul play. Since Shaffer's mother had recently died, some speculated he had gone away temporarily to grieve in solitude, but his disappearance proved permanent. No evident reasons appeared for him voluntarily disappearing.

Those who had seen Shaffer that evening, including his father, were asked to take polygraph tests. He and Reed passed theirs, as did all the others, while Florence refused. The two women Shaffer had last been seen talking to were later identified; in 2009 they said they had never been asked to take a test.

Waggoner called Shaffer's phone every evening before going to bed for a long time after the disappearance. Usually it went straight to voicemail, but one night in September 2006 it rang three times. "I kept calling it to hear it purely because it was one of the best sounds I have ever heard, even if no one picked up", she wrote on her MySpace page. Cingular, Shaffer's wireless provider, said the ringing may have been due to a computer glitch. However, a ping from the phone was detected at a cell tower in Hilliard, 14 miles (23 km) northwest of Columbus.

Police received many tips, none of which led to breakthroughs. At a Pearl Jam concert later that year in Cincinnati, lead singer Eddie Vedder asked the audience for information about Shaffer's disappearance, but no useful tips emerged. Possible sightings in Michigan, Texas, and Sweden were investigated.

Randy continued searching for his son on his own. A psychic he consulted told him Shaffer's body was in the water near a bridge pier. He and Derek, Shaffer's younger brother, along with other citizens interested in the case, bought waders and spent much of their free time along the shores of the Olentangy River, which flows through Columbus adjacent to the OSU campus, searching in vain near bridges. This possibility also led police to briefly consider the heavily disputed smiley face murder theory. Columbus police eventually rejected any connection to the alleged killer in Shaffer's case, following the lead of most law enforcement agencies, including the FBI, that had looked into it.

=== Death of Randy Shaffer ===
In September 2008, during a heavy windstorm, Randy was clearing debris in the yard of his home in Baltimore, Ohio. A branch blew off a nearby tree and fatally struck him. Neighbors found his body the next day and called police.

After his obituary ran online, a condolence book was posted. One of the signatures read, "To Dad, love Brian (U.S. Virgin Islands)". This suggested Shaffer might have left Columbus for a new life elsewhere. Further investigation showed the note had been posted from a publicly accessible computer in Franklin County. It was determined to be a hoax.

== Subsequent developments ==
Shortly after Randy's death, Neil Rosenberg, attorney for Florence, wrote to Don Corbett, a private investigator who had volunteered his time to help the Shaffer family, regarding his client's continued refusal to take a polygraph test. Rosenberg suggested that he had learned the Columbus police believed Shaffer was alive. "If Brian is alive, which is what I'm led to believe after speaking with the detective involved, then it is Brian, and not Clint [Florence], who is causing his family pain and hardship," he wrote. "Brian should come forward and end this." Rosenberg said his client had nothing to hide, had shared everything he knew from the beginning, and he did not see value in Florence doing so again.

Despite Rosenberg's assertions, many of those close to Shaffer have criticized Florence for not being forthcoming. "As soon as the detective started getting involved, that's when he pretty much had no contact with anybody," Derek recalled. "I've always thought he definitely knows something— just won't come forward with it." He believes it is still possible that Shaffer is alive and that Florence knows where he might have gone. "If Brian did take off somewhere, if that is the case, we just always had a strong feeling that Clint would possibly know that," he said. Waggoner also believes Florence is withholding information, but thinks it is likely her former boyfriend is dead and did not run off. "I can't imagine he would have just done that," she said.

In 2014, Columbus police said they were still receiving at least two tips a month on the case through the local Crime Stoppers hotline, though none had proven useful. Evidence in the case filled four boxes of files. One of the original investigators, Andre Edwards, told Columbus Monthly that after an extensive review of the camera footage at the Ugly Tuna Saloona from the night Shaffer disappeared, intended to rule out the idea that he could have left in disguise, he could "say with 100-percent certainty" that Shaffer did not leave via the escalator. Police said they had three theories about the case but declined to discuss them even generally with the magazine.

In 2019, an image of an alleged American homeless man in Tijuana, Mexico, who resembled Shaffer began circulating online. Columbus news station 10TV forwarded the image to the detective in charge the case in 2020. The detective sent it to the FBI for facial recognition analysis, which ruled Shaffer out as the man's identity.

In March 2021, the Ohio Bureau of Criminal Investigation released an age-progressed photo of what Shaffer might look like at age 42, nearly 15 years after his disappearance.

== Legacy ==
Between Shaffer's disappearance and his own death, Randy joined families of other missing adults in Ohio in lobbying the state legislature to pass a bill establishing a statewide protocol for such cases. At the time Shaffer disappeared, individual departments determined how to handle investigations, and some families felt their relatives' cases had suffered as a result. By the time Randy died, the bill had become law.

== See also ==
- List of Ohio State University people
- List of people who disappeared mysteriously (2000–present)

Other missing people who were last seen alone by security cameras

- Rebecca Coriam
- Andrew Gosden
- Steven Koecher
- Claudia Lawrence
- Lars Mittank
- Sneha Anne Philip
- Tiffany Whitton
