= Luke Homan =

American basketball player (1985–2006)

Luke Homan

Lucas Homan (January 22, 1985 – September 29, 2006) was a former Milwaukee basketball player.

The son of Jerry and Patti Homan, his father played basketball at Marquette University. As a senior at Brookfield Central High School, Lucas averaged 18.6 points, 5.3 rebounds and four assists per game. Homan served as the quarterback for the Lancers' 2002 state final football team. He walked on to the basketball team at Milwaukee, but transferred to UW-La Crosse after Bruce Pearl left to coach at Tennessee. As a junior, he played in all 28 games and helped the team win 20 games.

== Death ==
On September 29, 2006, Homan disappeared from downtown La Crosse after celebrating Oktoberfest with a group of friends. He was found dead on October 2 in the Mississippi River, in La Crosse, Wisconsin, aged 21. The autopsy revealed acute alcohol intoxication as a major contributing factor to his death as well as cold water drowning. Drug tests were run on Homan; all toxicology tests turned out to be negative. His phone was found under his bed but it was confirmed that he had his phone with him at Oktoberfest. His death is suspicious

== Aftermath ==
Another UW La Crosse student was charged with obstruction in Homan's investigation. He is believed to be the last person to see Homan alive. He had told police Homan had gotten into an altercation with another bar patron and fled; he told a different story to Homan's friends and other UW students, saying he had been cut when he was punched by a man that was fighting with Homan and that three men were involved in the altercation. The young man appeared "upset and nervous" upon being questioned by the police during the search for Homan. He said three men had gotten into an altercation with Homan and then followed him out of the Vibe; these three men then returned without Homan and struck him with a beer bottle, cutting him. He immediately left the bar and headed home. Authorities stressed he was not involved in Homan's death, but was charged with giving conflicting accounts to police.

== See also ==
- Smiley Face Killers: The Hunt for Justice
- Smiley face murder theory
