= Disappearance of Steven Koecher =

Unsolved 2009 missing person case

Coordinates: 35.9439°N 115.1017°W

Steven Koecher
- Born: November 1, 1979; Amarillo, Texas, U.S.
- Disappeared: December 13, 2009 (aged 30); Henderson, Nevada, U.S.
- Status: Missing for 16 years, 10 months and 13 days
- Education: Amarillo High School, Brigham Young University–Idaho
- Alma mater: University of Utah
- Occupations: Journalist, advertising sales
- Years active: 2005–2009
- Height: 5 ft 11 in (180 cm)

At midday on December 13, 2009, Steven Koecher (born November 1, 1979) got out of his car, parked at the end of a cul-de-sac in the Anthem neighborhood of Henderson, Nevada, United States, an action recorded on a nearby home's security camera. After returning shortly afterwards, he retrieved something from the vehicle and walked away, with another security camera capturing his reflection in a car window. Koecher has not been seen since, although some activity was recorded on his cell phone over the next two days.

Koecher's absence from his home, work and church activities in St. George, Utah, was not noted for several days. Eventually the homeowners' association of Anthem contacted Koecher's employer and family about his abandoned car, at which time he was reported missing. Police initially had few leads, since it appeared he had intended to return to Utah and did not appear to be involved in any criminal activity. The reason for his trip to the Las Vegas area that day has never been determined, though his family believes Koecher was looking for work. Searches in the area around where he was last seen yielded no evidence.

Further investigation found credit card and cell phone receipts and witness statements showing that in the week prior to his disappearance, Koecher had been driving great distances around Utah and Nevada, including almost 1,100 miles (1,800 km) in one day. The purpose of most of these trips is also unknown; however, on one trip, he stopped to visit a former girlfriend's parents and had lunch at their house.

Koecher disappeared a week after Utah woman Susan Powell vanished. Family members of Joshua Powell, Susan's husband who had come under suspicion in her case, alleged Susan might have suddenly eloped with Koecher. Police found no evidence to support such claims, and Susan's family and Koecher's have both dismissed that theory. The Koecher case has been the subject of an episode of Investigation Discovery's documentary series Disappeared.

== Background ==
Steven Koecher was born on November 1, 1979, in Amarillo, Texas, one of four children of Rolf and Deanne Koecher. He was a devout member of the Church of Jesus Christ of Latter-day Saints (LDS Church). Koecher was active in the Boy Scouts of America, eventually making Eagle Scout. After graduating from Amarillo High School in 1998, Koecher attended Ricks College (now Brigham Young University–Idaho) and later transferred to the University of Utah, where he received a degree in communications. He performed missionary work in Brazil and learned to speak Portuguese.

After college, Koecher interned in the office of the governor of Utah for nine months. A year and a half later, he went to work as a stringer for the Davis County Clipper, a Bountiful-based bi-weekly newspaper edited by his father. Koecher remained at the Clipper for another year and a half, with some articles he worked on receiving awards from the Utah Press Association.

In 2007, Koecher began working for the Salt Lake Tribune's digital advertising division. According to his mother, he liked the work but disliked the overnight shift. The many temperature inversions in the Salt Lake City area that winter also bothered Koecher, so after a year he decided to leave his job at the Tribune and relocate to St. George, in the warmer southwestern portion of Utah. He rented a room in a duplex from a landlord whose primary residence was in Utah County, some 300 miles (480 km) to the north.

Koecher initially worked with another online advertising firm, Matchbin, but that employment ended soon after he relocated. With the Great Recession underway, it was difficult for Koecher to find a new job. He was able to find part-time work distributing flyers for a local window-washing firm, but the income was inadequate to meet his expenses. By November 2009, Koecher was several months behind on his rent and was actively seeking another job, using connections from the local ward (LDS congregation) where he volunteered.

=== December 10–12, 2009 ===
On December 10, 2009, Koecher apparently left St. George in the early morning hours and drove his Chevrolet Cavalier 300 miles (480 km) north on Interstate 15 to Salt Lake City, where he bought some gas with a debit card. He then traveled west on Interstate 80 another 125 miles (201 km) to West Wendover, Nevada, where he again pulled off the highway to refuel. After that, he continued another 100 miles (160 km) to the Ruby Valley ranch of the Neff family.

Koecher had previously dated Annemarie Neff and had visited the ranch in the past, and was hoping to see her again when he made an unannounced stop at the Neff home. She was not there, but the Neffs served Koecher lunch. He told them he was on his way to visit family in Sacramento, California, but was not certain whether he could continue in that direction due to bad weather. After two hours, he left and decided to return to St. George the way he had come, stopping to buy gas again in Salt Lake City and Springville, followed by dinner at a Taco Time in Nephi. By the time Koecher returned home, he had driven nearly 1,100 miles (1,800 km).

During the day, Koecher talked with his mother on the phone. The two discussed his plans for returning to the family's home in Bountiful for Christmas. Koecher's mother said he seemed upbeat about the upcoming holiday and his job prospects, despite his financial difficulties. He did not tell her of his road trip that day.

The next day, while handing out flyers for his employer, Koecher assisted two young girls who had accidentally been locked out of their home by helping find a nearby resident to care for the girls until their mother could be located. That same day, Koecher spoke with his ward's bishop, who also described Koecher's mood as positive and optimistic about the bishop's offer to help find a job.

On December 12, Koecher embarked on another road trip. That morning his phone pinged a cell tower near Overton, Nevada, at the north end of Lake Mead. In the evening, he bought gas and snacks at a convenience store in Mesquite, along Interstate 15 near the Arizona state line. Why Koecher went to Nevada that day is unknown. Three hours after his Mesquite purchase, he visited a Kmart store outside St. George. He purchased a baby's bib and cookies, believed to be Christmas gifts for family members.

== Disappearance ==
A neighbor of Koecher's recalled seeing him return to his apartment around 10 p.m. on December 12, and departing about 30 minutes later. The next morning, Sunday, December 13, Koecher spoke by telephone with two friends who called him about scheduled church meetings later that day. Koecher told both callers he was in Las Vegas about 120 miles away and might not arrive home in time to attend church, but was willing to come home if necessary to help officiate services. Neither of Koecher's friends asked why Koecher was in Las Vegas, and neither reported anything unusual about their conversations with him.

External videos
- Security camera footage of Koecher in Anthem

At 11:54 a.m., on December 13, a home security camera in a retirement community in the Anthem development in southern Henderson recorded Koecher's car driving into the cul-de-sac where it was later found. Six minutes later, a figure dressed in a white shirt and slacks, believed by his family to be Koecher, walked in the opposite direction down the sidewalk in front, carrying something in one hand that appeared to be a file folder or portfolio. Shortly afterwards, another security camera in a garage on an adjacent street caught his reflection as he walked north. Koecher has not been seen since.

Koecher's phone remained active. Around 5 p.m. that day it pinged a tower at the intersection of Arroyo Grande Boulevard and American Pacific Drive, more than 10 miles (16 km) northeast of where he had parked. Two hours after that, it pinged another tower near Henderson's Whitney Ranch subdivision, two miles (3.2 km) north of the previous ping. Early the next morning, the phone pinged a tower at the interchange between Interstate 515/U.S. Route 93 and Russell Road, two more miles to the north. Koecher's landlord sent a text, and then an hour later the phone was used to check Koecher's voicemail. The phone remained in that tower's vicinity for the next two days, suggesting that its battery had died. There has been no activity since.

Locations
1 Savannah Springs, Henderson

A day after that last ping, Anthem's homeowners' association took note of the car at the end of the Savannah Springs cul-de-sac and tried to find its owner. After looking in his car they saw flyers Koecher had been distributing for the window-washing company in St. George and called a phone number on the flyer. Anthem staff spoke with the company's owner, left a voicemail for Koecher, and later contacted Koecher's mother. She returned their call on December 17, and, realizing no one else in the family had talked to him in a week and that they were unable to locate him, reported him missing. Koecher's brother and sister drove to St. George from the Salt Lake City area to start searching. A search of Koecher's apartment found nothing unusual or out of place, and he had not seemed to pack personal items for a lengthy journey.

== Investigations ==
Koecher's family went to jails, morgues and hospitals in the Las Vegas area in their search. At one point, when employees at an International House of Pancakes said a man matching Koecher's description had eaten there every day for three weeks, Koecher's family members themselves ate there for four nights. Another employee eventually gave them a more detailed description of the man and his eating habits, which led the family to conclude he was not Koecher. Koecher's family and close friends said they knew of no substance abuse problem, large debts, mental health issues or other reasons he might voluntarily drop out of contact.

The Las Vegas Metropolitan Police (LVMPD) canvassed the houses in the neighborhood where Koecher's car had been parked. With the help of volunteers, they used helicopters, all terrain vehicles and sniffer dogs. By Christmas, the media in Salt Lake City and Las Vegas had begun reporting the story. A local dairy put Koecher's picture on a milk carton, and the LVMPD put a video with information on the case on its YouTube channel, adding there was no evidence of foul play. Another vehicle seen on the security camera footage driving up and down the street around the time Koecher parked and walked away from his car was investigated, and turned out to be a local real estate agent showing a house in the area.

In April 2010, another party of searchers scoured the open desert south of the Henderson Executive Airport to the west of where Koecher had parked in response to a tip passed along to a former LVMPD officer working as a private investigator for the family. A group of 70 covered about a half-mile (0.80 km) stretch in two hours. Bone fragments were found, but they were not human.

Koecher's father Rolf died in February 2011 after a brief illness that may have been toxic shock syndrome. Rolf had, with his wife and family, recently finished filming an episode of the Investigation Discovery cable channel's documentary series Disappeared about Steven's case. It aired two months later.

A cousin of the Koechers started a Facebook page devoted to the case. It generated not only some tips but suggestions for how to investigate further. Members of the WebSleuths Internet forum also took up the case; they assembled a timeline of events based on newspaper accounts and social media posts by Koecher's family and friends.

In 2015, a local search and rescue group organized another effort, this time going high up the hills south of Anthem, on a different theory of what Koecher might have been doing. They did not find anything.

As of 2026, Koecher remained missing, with his brother saying, "We think that unwittingly or knowingly he got himself into a bad situation and is now gone." His case was discussed by Kara Robinson Chamberlain in her show Somebody Knows Something.

== Theories ==
Koecher's father Rolf stated: "We've considered every possibility. But each possibility has a contradiction. Is it plausible that someone is walking down the street and then suddenly they've vanished? All clues are consistent with that, but that's not possible.

Koecher's family believes he went to Henderson that morning for a job opportunity. Despite the odd location where he parked his car, on the security video Koecher is neatly dressed and walking purposefully, which his family believes was an indication he was at the scene intentionally. "He doesn't look confused or dazed", Steven's brother Dallin said in 2018.

Beyond that, however, police said in 2018 there is no further information. "We know about as much now as we did the second we realized he was gone," the St. George police detective in charge of the case said in 2018. Koecher's financial difficulties notwithstanding, his family does not believe he chose to voluntarily disappear or take his own life. His mother said that in her last conversation with him, on December 10, he was optimistic about his ability to find another job and the two were making plans for his Christmas visit home.

It has been argued Koecher's car and its contents also suggest he was not planning on lengthy travel away from him. His father said that the car was in working order and the gas tank was half full when he found it on December 17, after his wife was contacted by the Anthem homeowners' association. In Koecher's car were the Christmas presents Steven had bought for his family at Kmart the previous day, as well as job applications and the flyers from the window washing service. At Koecher's apartment, his clothing and possessions remained where he stored them and had not been disturbed or packed.

Koecher's extensive travel in the days leading up to his disappearance has led to suppositions he may have turned to some sort of illicit activity for income. A drug dog was taken to sniff over his car but did not alert on anything. The family does not consider Koecher's travel to be particularly unusual. One of his reasons for moving to St. George was his hobby of doing genealogy research in that area; he often went on tours of cemeteries looking for ancestors' graves. Koecher's mother believes the road trips were his way of keeping himself busy despite his underemployment.

Checks of Koecher's financial history and phone records turned up nothing unusual aside from the trips, though it was later revealed he never deposited money given to him by family to help pay his late rent. A single charge to his credit card since the disappearance was just an automatic charge made to webhosting company GoDaddy ensuing from his days at Matchbin. One unknown phone number turned out to be the family of the two girls Koecher had been helping on the day before he went to Las Vegas.

A search of Koecher's computer and Internet browsing history found nothing unusual. Investigators also checked his borrowing history at the St. George library and found nothing which suggested any unexplored leads. Koecher kept a diary, but recorded no problems in his life at the time of his disappearance beyond his monetary issues and his ongoing bachelorhood, neither of which he believed would last much longer.

While there is no evidence that would suggest Koecher was murdered or kidnapped, neither the St. George nor Henderson police have found any evidence to eliminate that possibility. "There's nothing that makes us suspicious," Detective Adam Olmstead of the St. George police told the Las Vegas Review-Journal. "But at the same time, it's a strange situation."

In 2022, private investigators Kevin Wyatt and Jim Berk (who worked with the Koecher family) said their research centered on people living at the Anthem community who may have been involved in Koecher's disappearance and death. They found information that police interviewed an Anthem resident who was described as excessively nervous when questioned about Koecher. They also found "photos of a room [at Anthem] that was destroyed at about the same time" Koecher disappeared. They believe the room's damage was possibly due to an assault, kidnapping or murder involving Koecher.

In 2024, Wyatt and Berk said that due to financial desperation, Koecher "might have got hooked up in something that may not have been in his best interest", possibly related to illegal drugs. Wyatt and Berk said that while the motives for Koecher's actions around the time of his disappearance were "uncertain", they also believed "he was definitely doing something for somebody else."

In their podcast devoted to the case, Wyatt and Berk stated their hypothesis that Koecher had agreed to perform deliveries or act as a courier for his landlord, who had a long history of arrests on a variety of criminal charges, most of which had been plea-bargained to misdemeanors with probation sentences. The investigators note the landlord's wife made public comments about an agreement with Koecher to settle his overdue rent. However, Wyatt and Berk stress they do not believe the landlord was directly responsible for Koecher's disappearance or death, but they do believe the landlord probably has important information he has not shared with the police or themselves.

=== Theorized connection to Susan Powell disappearance ===
Koecher disappeared a week after Susan Powell disappeared from her home in the Salt Lake City suburb of West Valley City, Utah. The Powell case received much more media attention than Koecher, as suspicion centered on Susan's husband Joshua and their troubled marriage. The circumstances of Susan's disappearance were also more clearly ominous.

There was early speculation the disappearances of Susan Powell and Steven Koecher might be somehow connected. In 2010, Joshua's family began making those allegations publicly, claiming on a website that Susan had framed her husband for murder and eloped with Koecher. Steven Powell, Joshua's father, outlined the theory in a February letter to police and FBI agents investigating his daughter-in-law's case.

Police investigated but found no corroborating evidence to support any connections between the Powell and Koecher disappearances. A Koecher family friend called the allegations "nonsense".

Joshua moved to Washington, where he killed his sons in a 2012 murder-suicide.

== See also ==
- List of people who disappeared mysteriously (2000–present)
- List of Disappeared episodes

Other missing people who were last seen alone by security cameras

- Disappearance of Rebecca Coriam
- Disappearance of Andrew Gosden
- Disappearance of Lars Mittank
- Disappearance of Sneha Anne Philip
- Disappearance of Brian Shaffer
