= Athletics at the 2023 African Games – Men's half marathon =

Men's half marathon at the 2023 African Games
- Location: Accra, Ghana
- Dates: 22 March
- Competitors: 20 from 12 nations
- Winning time: 1:05:04

Medalists
gold medal	Samsom Amare	Eritrea
silver medal	William Amponsah	Ghana
bronze medal	Isaac Mpofu	Zimbabwe

The men's half marathon event at the 2023 African Games was held on 22 March 2024 in Accra, Ghana.

== Results ==
Rank	Name	Nationality	Time	Notes
1st place, gold medalist(s)	Samsom Amare	Eritrea	1:05:04	
2nd place, silver medalist(s)	William Amponsah	Ghana	1:05:13	
3rd place, bronze medalist(s)	Isaac Mpofu	Zimbabwe	1:05:37	
4	Namakoe Nkhasi	Lesotho	1:05:58	
5	Haftamu Abadi	Ethiopia	1:06:13	
6	Panuel Mkungo	Kenya	1:06:30	
7	Josephat Gisemo	Tanzania	1:06:34	
8	Mao Ako	Tanzania	1:06:39	
9	Mumin Gala	Djibouti	1:07:37	
10	Kibrom Ghebrezgiabhier	Eritrea	1:07:53	
11	Mikael Tesfatsion	Eritrea	1:09:49	
12	Tsepo Ramashamole	Lesotho	1:10:54	
13	Shehu Muazu	Nigeria	1:11:03	
14	Jeremias Kandumbo	Angola	1:11:40	
15	Atia Koogo	Ghana	1:12:14	
16	Nelson Biyoko	Republic of the Congo	1:17:57	
17	Aniceto Oyono Ndong	Equatorial Guinea	1:19:40	
	Manuel Mba Nzeng Nangal	Equatorial Guinea	DNF	
	Masresha Bire	Ethiopia	DNF	
	Ashagre Tesema	Ethiopia	DNF	
	Peter Mwaniki	Kenya	DNS	
