= Smiley Face Killers: The Hunt for Justice =

TV series produced by Oxygen TV

- Created by: Alison Dammann
- Country of origin: United States
- Original language: English
- No. of seasons: 1
- No. of episodes: 6

Production
- Executive producers: Jason Blum; Alison Dammann
- Production companies: Blumhouse Television; 44 Blue Productions

Original release
- Network: Oxygen
- Release: January 19 – February 23, 2019

Smiley Face Killers: The Hunt for Justice is an American television docuseries that originally aired from January 19 to February 23, 2019 on Oxygen. It examines possible victims of the smiley-face murder theory. Produced by Alison Dammann, the six episodes focus on cases of young men who have disappeared and whose bodies are found in a body of water some time later.

Smiley-face graffiti has been found at most of the crime scenes, which is how the cases are connected. All deaths have been ruled as an undetermined or accidental drowning. The show seeks to look at these cases and find a connection to the smiley-face murder theory in hopes of reopening the cases and redefining the causes of death.

== Summary ==
The six episodes each focus on one victim, including information on the case prior to investigation, how the smiley face murder theory may apply to the case and the outcome of the investigation. All cases covered share some common factors: all victims were college-aged males who had disappeared after a night out with friends, whose bodies are found later in a body of water and whose deaths are ruled as accidental or undetermined drownings.

Retired police officials Kevin Gannon, Anthony Duarte and Dr. Lee Gilbertson lead the investigation with help from their team and locals in the victims' communities. Each episode typically includes an introduction to the case, interviews with the victim's family, the discovery of discrepancies in the case that may tie to the smiley-face murder theory and determination of a way to reopen the case or find additional answers. Most of the episodes do not conclude with a closed case, but rather expose the audience and investigators to new information that may support a new case or conclusion.

== Investigators involved in the series ==
The series' main investigators are Anthony Duarte and Kevin Gannon. Gannon is a retired New York Police Department sergeant and has received nearly 100 medals for bravery, being named one of the most highly valued members of the Special Investigation Division of the Detective Bureau and NYPD sergeants before he retired in 2001. Duarte is a retired U.S. Department of Homeland Security TSA security manager and NYPD second-grade detective. Duarte has been awarded ten Excellence in Police Duty awards and five commendations.

In addition to Gannon and Duarte, Mikey Donovan and D. Lee "Doc" Gilbertson are featured in some episodes. Donovan is a retired NYPD detective who was a first responder at the World Trade Center on 9/11 and specializes in interrogation. Gilbertson has a doctorate in sociology and a master's degree in criminal justice. Gilbertson is also employed at the National Gang Crime Research Center and is an executive editor for the Journal of Gang Research.

== Episodes ==
No.	Title	Original release date
1	"Dakota James"	January 19, 2019
During a night out with friends on January 25, 2017, 23-year-old Dakota James left his friends at a bar on Liberty Avenue in downtown Pittsburgh. James was presumably going home to the north side of Pittsburgh. Surveillance camera footage from the Cultural District caught James walking through Katz Plaza as well as down an alley toward Fort Duquesne Boulevard. This footage seems to be the last known footage of him alive. The main theory is that he used the alley to cross Fort Duquesne Boulevard to Clemente Bridge to urinate in the Allegheny River. According to his friends, James had been possibly drugged and attempted to be abducted six weeks before his disappearance. Kevin Gannon thinks that James was also drugged on the night he disappeared. Gannon believes that James was then abducted, held for some time, killed and dumped in a body of water. Forty days after Dakota's disappearance, his body was found in the Ohio River near Interstate 79 bridge over Neville Island. His death was ruled as an accidental drowning by the medical examiner. Dr. Cyril Wecht found that the level of decomposition did not fit that of a person who had been in the water for seven winter weeks. Pam James, the mother of the victim, mentioned that her son had no marks on his body, as would normally be found on a body that had traveled down a river for 10 miles and supposedly through a dam. From these findings, the detectives and Dr. Wecht believed that the body was placed in the river beyond the Emsworth Dam on the back channel of the river. Robinson Township volunteer swift-water rescuers Kenny Kisow and Scott Grahn also corroborated these findings and agreed that the body would not have looked as pristine as it did if he had traveled that far and gone through a dam. The district attorney allowed the family and investigators access to the autopsy report, including the pictures. Dr. Wecht and the detectives focused heavily on a picture that shows the back of the victim's neck with ligature marks. Wecht believes that these marks are evidence of a ligature around the neck, though such findings were not reported in the original autopsy report. Because there was no internal damage to the neck reported in the autopsy report, Wecht cannot determine that James was strangled to death, but the marks are evidence that something was around his neck. In addition, pooled blood was found in the fingers, which Wecht indicates could be the result of trying to pull a ligature away from the neck during a struggle. The investigators and the James family go back to the district attorney because Pam believes that they could look into this finding and possibly reopen Dakota's case. When the D.A. sent a homicide detective to the medical examiner's office, it was concluded that there were no ligature marks. Stephen Zappala states that the neck marks were just dried blood that was washed off during the autopsy. However, if the victim's body had been in the water for 40 days, the dried blood would have already been washed off, as Pam believes. Zappala explains that there were two sets of pictures, the first where blood is seen by the nose, mouth and pooled around the neck, and the second where the neck is clean and without no ligature marks. Wecht states that the death should be listed as undetermined instead of accidental. Pam, the D.A. and Wecht all doubt that serial killers are involved, but Wecht and Pam believe that foul play occurred. Gannon states that there are enough unanswered questions for police to take a second look, urging them to reopen the case. Pam James still believes that her son did not drown as a result of being reckless and drunk and says that her family will never give up until they know what happened.
2	"Lucas Homan"	January 26, 2019
In the fall of 2006, after celebrating with friends at Oktoberfest in downtown La Crosse, Wisconsin, 21-year-old Lucas Homan disappeared. After three days, his body was found on the shore of the Mississippi River. Homan's family was wary because seven young men had drowned in the river, but he had assured his parents that he would be alright. Law enforcement ruled the death as an accidental drowning. The autopsy report indicated acute alcohol intoxication as a major factor in the death. The victim's parents, Jerry and Patti Homan, and best friend Sam Donaldson, who was with Luke the night he disappeared, do not agree with the official cause of death, as anyone going to La Crosse would know that the river was the wrong way from the bars frequented by university students a half-mile away. When Homan left with his friend after barhopping, the two became separated and the friend ended in the hospital with a head injury later that night. This friend later stated that he had no idea of what had happened the night before. During the investigation, a K9 unit alerted to a van that had been used by one of the bands playing at a bar where Lucas and his friends went, but the finding was later ruled inconclusive. Gannon, his team and Homan's parents work with underwater forensic expert Bobby Chacon, forensic tool-mark analyst William Moore and forensic footwear specialist Marty Ludas to take another look at the autopsy report. Bobby Chacon concludes that the victim had only been in the water for 3–12 hours, far fewer than the 50 hours that the police had stated. Moore and Ludas find that the injuries on Homan's forehead resulted from the action of someone holding him down with a boot. The new evidence leads the investigators and the Homan family to conclude that Luke Homan didn't accidentally drown, but was murdered. Gannon and Patti Homan take their evidence to the La Crosse Police Department to convince them to reopen the case. As of the air date of the episode, the family is still waiting on a response.
3	"William Hurley"	February 2, 2019
On October 14, 2009, the body of 24-year-old William Hurley was found in the Charles River near the TD Garden stadium. William Hurley had been attending a Bruin's game at the stadium when he left halfway through the game and contacted his fiancée, Claire Lebeau, for a ride. When Claire arrived at the spot agreed upon, William was nowhere to be found. With the discovery of his body, it was found that William had received blunt-force trauma to his head, an eye socket and leg. Alcohol and the date-rape drug GHB, was also found in William's system. The theory in this case by the police was that William stumbled through the stadium parking lot towards the river and had fallen in. The surveillance footage from the stadium shows William stumbling through the parking lot and struggling to keep himself upright. William's death was ruled as an undetermined drowning and was later found that he was one of more than 10 young men who had drowned in the Charles River under mysterious circumstances. Lynn Martin, the mother of William Hurley, had originally disregarded the smiley face murder theory, but eventually came around once she spoke with Kevin Gannon. Gannon and Dr. Lee Gilbertson meet with forensic toxicologist Sabra-Botch Jones to find more information on the GHB that was found in Will's system. Jones states that humans will always have a normal level of GHB in their systems but the 18 micrograms found in William's system suggest that it was administered and was able to impair William. The investigators then meet with forensic pathologist Dr. Elizabeth Laposata and underwater forensic investigator Rhonda Moniz to discuss William's injuries and the area in which his body was found. Laposata concludes that the injuries found on William's body would not have resulted from falling into the river and would not have happened post-mortem. Rhonda Moniz and the investigators discuss how it was odd that William had supposedly entered the water near Nashua Street but his body was found farther upstream than there. Moniz states that there is no way William's body or any body for that matter could travel against the current. This would suggest that William had either entered the water farther upstream or he had been dumped minutes before his body was discovered. Dr. Laposata also concludes that there would have had to have been some other human interaction contributing to William's death besides him falling into the river. The Boston Police Department received a request to look at William's case again during the time in which the episode was being filmed, who then passed it along to the Massachusetts State Police. From there, a detective contacted Lynn Martin and is currently reviewing this new evidence.
4	"Brian Welzien"	February 9, 2019
During the early morning hours of New Year's Day 2000, 21-year-old college student Brian Welzien went missing. Brian had been celebrating New Years at a Y2K celebration in Chicago, Illinois before his disappearance. Brian's body was not found until 77 days later on a beach in Gary, Indiana. The theory that came from the police indicates that Brian must've been intoxicated and fallen into Lake Michigan, drowned, and his body then traveled around 30 miles from there over the two and a half months he was missing. Brian's death was ruled as an undetermined drowning. However, despite his body supposedly being in the water for 77 days, his autopsy report only indicated slight decomposition. Detective Sgt. William Fazekas, the original detective on Brian's case, was reportedly surprised by the minimal decomposition, even stating that he thought the body had only been in the water for around a week upon his initial viewing of the body. Gannon, Dr. Gilbertson and Fazekas meet with forensic pathologist Dr. Cyril Wecht to take another look at the original case files and pictures. With the minimal decomposition and the fact that Welzien's organs were mostly intact, Wecht found it very hard to believe that Brian had been in the water for 77 days. Wecht further states that there was no fluid in the lungs and no sand found in the stomach of Brian Welzien, as indicated by the medical examiner. This evidence shows that Brian did not drown and was most likely dead upon entering the water. Dr. Gilbertson estimates that Brian had only been dead 36 hours before his body was discovered. After presenting the findings to Brian's mother, Stephany Welzien, Fazekas agrees to contact the medical examiner to possibly reopen the case. Currently, Fazekas is pursuing new leads in Brian Welzien's case.
5	"Tommy Booth"	February 16, 2019
On January 19, 2008, 24-year-old Tommy Booth disappeared from a bar in Woodlyn, Pennsylvania. Booth had been celebrating a friend's 21st birthday with a group of his friends. The security camera footage from the night only shows Tommy entering the bar but never leaving. However, two weeks after his disappearance, Tommy's body was found face down in a creek located behind the same bar in which he was last seen despite the area being searched multiple times during the time in which Tommy was missing. When Tommy's body was found, it was found that his body was in full rigor mortis, but this is usually only characteristic of a person who has been dead 24–36 hours. Kevin Gannon and Dr. Gilbertson agree that this evidence goes against the idea that Tommy drowned the night he disappeared. Gannon and Gilbertson also found that it was almost as if Tommy's body was staged, with sticks placed around his body and footprints and marks in the soil around the discovery site. Tommy's death was ultimately ruled as a probable drowning by the medical examiner. Gannon and Dr. Gilbertson meet with Scott Roder, a crime scene reconstruction specialist who built a CGI model of the site where Tommy's body was found. Roder states that he took his findings to Captain Scott Willoughby, who originally found no evidence of foul play but was wary once he found smiley face graffiti near the bar Tommy was last seen. Roder also concluded that Tommy's feet were placed in a way that suggested that he was dragged through the sand by his legs. Willoughby, however, disregards this information and states that it could just be formed by the flow of the water. Roder also believed that the condition of Booth's body would have looked a lot different if he had actually been in the water for the two weeks he had been missing. Roder then supports the idea that if Booth had been dead since the night he disappeared, his body would not be in rigor mortis. With this information, Willoughby suggested that Dr. Cyril Wecht look at Tommy's autopsy report, who agreed with Roder's findings and said that Tommy's death was "highly suspicious of foul play". Willoughby has since contacted the Delaware County Medical Examiner to look at the new evidence. Currently, the family and the investigators are waiting on a response.
6	"Todd Geib"	February 23, 2019
22-year-old Todd Geib was attending an orchard party in Muskegon, Michigan on June 25, 2005. Todd's body was found 22 days later upright in a private lake near the location of the orchard party he had been at. The theory from the police was that Todd had left the party and ended up at the lake and drowned. Todd's death was ruled as an undetermined drowning. Todd's body was found with his head and shoulders out of the water, almost as if he was swimming, and his body had minimal decomposition, suggesting that he had not been in the water or even dead for 22 days. Alcohol and antidepressants were found in Geib's system, despite him not reportedly suffering from depression at the time of his disappearance. It was later found that Geib had made a lot of calls from his phone the night he disappeared, including one to a friend who heard Todd say, "I'm in a field" before the call ended. Gannon and Dr. Lee Gilbertson meet with pharmacist David McDiarmid to find out more information regarding the medication found in Todd's system. McDiarmid states that the medications found in Todd's system would not normally be given together because when given together, they are known to cause side effects such as confusion, agitation, and risk of hallucinations. McDiarmid adds that these drugs could easily be slipped into a drink and could cause an overdose. Gannon, Gilbertson, and McDiarmid all agree that the level of drugs in Todd's system would leave him completely incapacitated and unable to get to the lake himself. Kathy Geib, mother of Todd, and Kevin Gannon take these findings to the Michigan State Police and they are able to get a meeting with the Muskegon County Prosecutor to look at the new evidence. Kathy is currently awaiting a response from the prosecutor as to whether her son's case will be reopened or not.
