= Samsom Amare =

Eritrean long-distance runner

Personal information
- Nationality: Eritrean
- Born: 1 January 1994 (age 32) Eritrea

Sport
- Sport: Athletics
- Event: Long-distance running

Samsom Amare is an Eritrean long-distance runner.

== Career ==
Samsom Amare won the Shanghai Marathon in 2024 in a time of 2:06:26.

== Notable results ==
Notable results by Samsom Amare
Year	Competition	Event	Result	Time
2023	Abu Dhabi Marathon	Marathon	1st	2:07:10
2024	African Games	Half-marathon	1st	1:05:04
2024	Paris Olympic Games	Marathon	10th	2:08:56
2024	Shanghai Marathon	Marathon	1st	2:06:26
