= Manchester Pusher =

Supposed killer in England

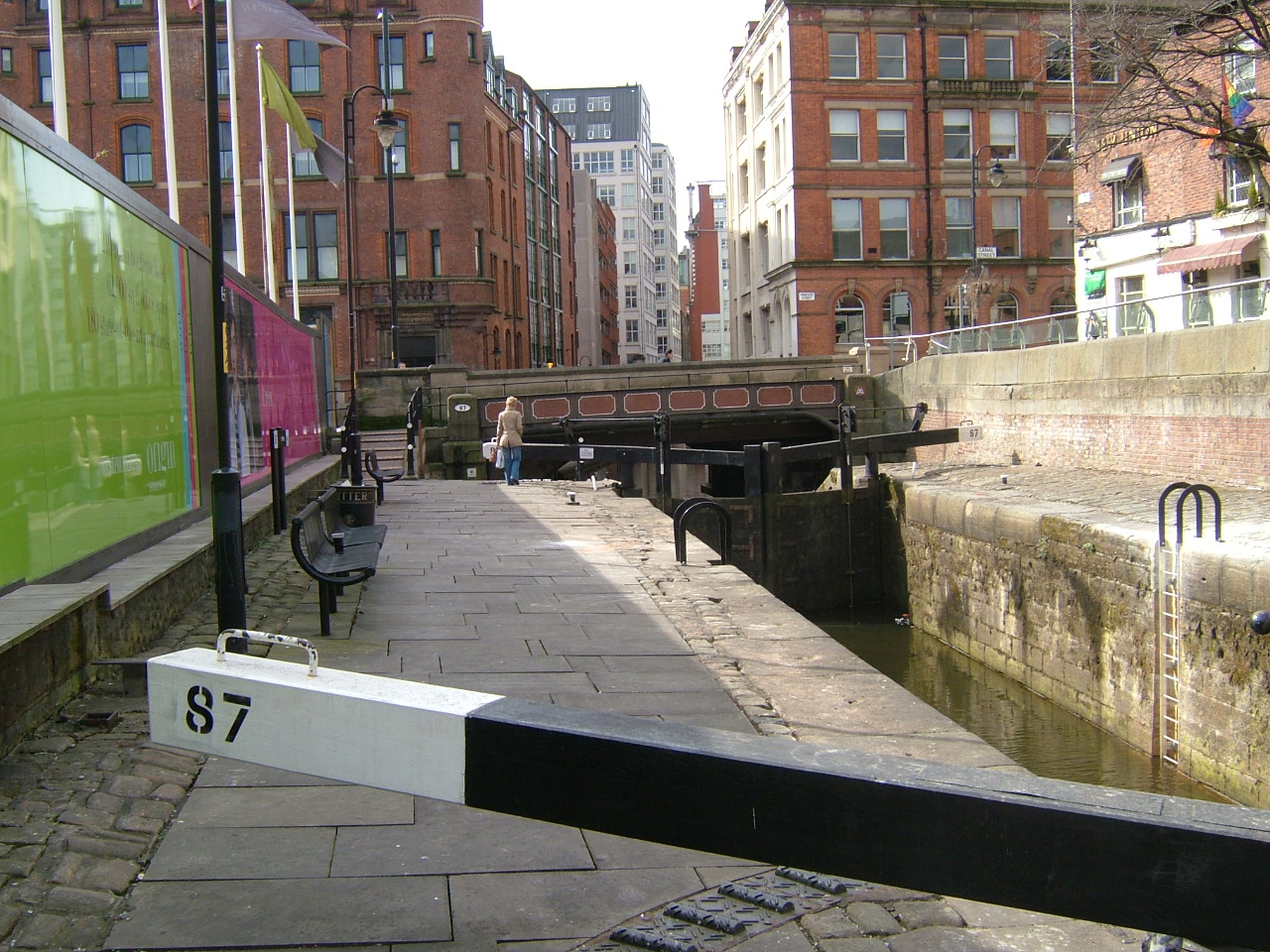
- A canal in Manchester city centre
- Date: 2004 / 2007 to date
- Location: Greater Manchester, including surrounding towns such as Bolton, Rochdale and Wigan
- Cause: Unknown
- Deaths: 86+

The Manchester Pusher is the name given to a hypothetical serial killer alleged to be responsible for the deaths of a number of people whose bodies have been retrieved from the waterways (principally the canals) of Greater Manchester, England, since at least 2007. Proponents of the theory claim that the "alarming" number of deaths that have occurred in the Rochdale, Ashton and Bridgewater Canals since the early 2000s cannot all have occurred as the result of accidents or suicides, and must have involved some element of foul play. Between 2008 and 2016 alone, 85 deaths were recorded in Greater Manchester's canals.

Greater Manchester Police have for years attempted to dispel the myth of the "Manchester pusher", and offered alternative explanations for the numbers of deaths, but the theory of the pusher "often returns". In 2018, Councillor Pat Karney, Manchester's city centre spokesman, dismissed the theory of a "Manchester pusher" as an urban myth, adding "It [...] will never die, and any time there's an incident or accident it comes up again. I think it causes distress to the families that have lost their loved ones".

== History ==
According to a BBC News article in 2018, the origins of the Manchester Pusher story can be traced back to a Daily Star Sunday article from January 2015, in which Professor Craig Jackson, head of psychology at Birmingham City University, concluded that it was "extremely unlikely that such an alarming number of bodies found in the canals [could be] the result of accidents or suicides", and that it was "entirely possible" that a canal killer or "gay slayer" was the cause for at least some of the deaths. By the time of the article's publication in 2015, Twitter users had already given the alleged canal killer the hashtag #thepusher.

Several commentators have agreed that if such an individual exists, they may be purposefully targeting young men, gay men, or men they believe to be gay, noting that certain towpaths along Manchester's canals have traditionally been used as gay cruising areas. Greater Manchester Police have refuted these claims, stating that there is nothing linking the deaths. In 2016, Detective Chief Inspector Pete Marsh was instructed to re-investigate all the deaths, searching for possible linkages amongst them. Marsh reported that he "did not believe young men or those that were gay made up the majority of the deaths", adding that he believed many of the individuals may have simply been drunk and fallen in accidentally.

=== Cyclist attack ===
On 10 April 2018, a 34-year-old cyclist was knocked into the Bridgewater Canal at 10:00 p.m. by an unknown assailant near Old Trafford football stadium, who proceeded to kick the cyclist back into the water as he attempted to get out. The assailant subsequently sprinted away from the scene, and the cyclist was able to get back onto land. The incident revived rumours of the "pusher", and Greater Manchester police stated they were looking for the suspect, said to be "a white male aged between 20 and 40". Andy Sutcliffe, Greater Manchester Police's Chief Inspector, stressed at the time that there was "... no evidence to suggest that this is linked to any other incidents and we've had no further reports." The story made the news as far away as New Zealand.

== Possible explanations ==
David Wilson, the chair of the Manchester Water Safety Partnership, was quoted in 2018 as saying that he suspected that a significant number of the canal deaths were alcohol-related. Other commentators have noted the fact that many bar owners in the city are keen to capitalise on the attractive waterside setting that the city's canals present, which poses a dangerous combination in the dark after people have consumed too many drinks. Barriers have been installed at certain points along the canal edge to prevent people from accidentally falling in.

== Documentary ==
In 2016, Channel 4 released a documentary investigating the myth entitled Manchester's Serial Killer?, by filmmaker Darren Lovell. In 2018, before the documentary was aired on Channel 4, Greater Manchester Police released their own video response on their YouTube channel, in which a senior detective again rebutted the claims that the "pusher" was at large.

== See also ==
- Colin Ireland (1954–2012), a British serial killer known as the "Gay Slayer"
- Smiley face murder theory, a similar alleged serial killer in the United States
