= William Amponsah =

Ghanaian runner (born 1999)

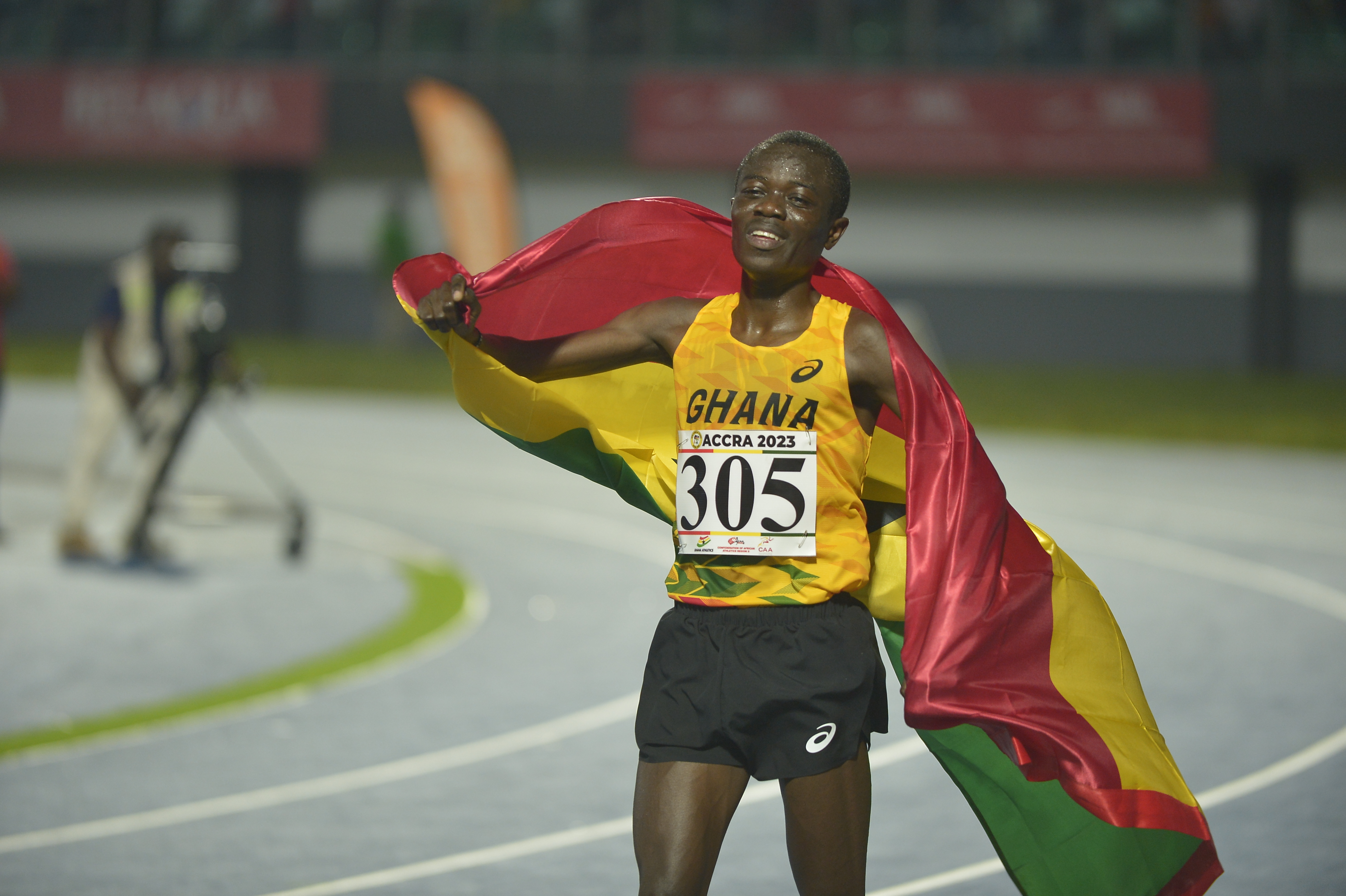
- Amponsah at the 2023 African Games

Personal information
- Born: 11 December 1999 (age 26) Agona Swedru, Ghana

Sport
- Country: Ghana
- Sport: Track and field
- Events: 3000 metres, 5000 m, 10,000 m, Half marathon
- College team: West Texas A&M Buffaloes
Medal record
Men's athletics
Representing Ghana
African Games
Silver medal – second place	2023 Accra	Half marathon

William Amponsah (born 11 December 1999) is a Ghanaian long-distance runner. He won a silver medal in the half marathon at the 2023 African Games. Amponsah also competes for the West Texas A&M Buffaloes, winning the 2023 and 2024 NCAA Division II men's cross country championships, as well as the 10,000 meters at the 2024 and 2025 outdoor track and field championships and the 5000 meters in 2025. He is also the Ghanaian national record holder in the indoor 3000 meters and the outdoor 10,000 meters, as well as the NCAA Division II record holder in the 10,000 meters.

== Personal bests ==
- 3000 metres indoor – 7:52.54 (Indianapolis 2025) NR
- 5000 metres – 13:30.99 (Raleigh 2025)
  - Indoor – 13:33.75 (Boston 2025)
- 10,000 metres – 27:47.93 (Azusa 2025) NR
