= Deborah Acquah =

Ghanaian long jumper

Personal information
- Born: 23 May 1996 (age 30) Ghana

Sport
- Country: Ghana
- Sport: Athletics
- Events: Long jump; Triple jump

Achievements and titles
- Personal bests: Long jump: 6.94 (2022); Triple jump: 14.27 (2021)
Medal record
Representing Ghana
Women's athletics
Commonwealth Games
Bronze medal – third place	2022 Birmingham	Long jump
African Games
Silver medal – second place	2019 Rabat	Long jump

Deborah Acquah (born May 23, 1996) is a Ghanaian Long jumper. She has competed at world championships, most recently at the 2019 African Games in Rabat, Morocco. She is the current holder of Ghana's indoor long and triple jump records.

== Early life and education ==
Acquah had her secondary school education at Fiaseman Senior High School. She was a student of Western Texas College but is now currently having her college education at Texas A&M University.

== Career ==
In August 2019, she competed at the 2019 African Games in Rabat and won a silver medal for Ghana with a jump of 6.37 m in the Women's Long Jump. She also competed in the NCAA Division 1 Championships in Austin, Texas and won a bronze in the women's long jump. In January 2020, her 21-foot six inch long jump broke a 22-year school record by four inches at the Ted Nelson Invitational. In February 2020, she broke the Texas A&M triple jump record to win first place at the Charlie Thomas Invitational.

On 4 April 2022, Acquah jumped 6.89 m in the long jump event during the Texas Dual Meet to set a new Ghanaian national record. With that jump she ranked at the number two in the Texas A&M history and makes her the seventh-best collegian of all time. Her jump was also the world-leading mark and placed her on the world number one in the women's long jump event. Based on that time she qualified for 2022 World Athletics Championships, 2022 Commonwealth Games, Africa Games and World University Games.

== Personal bests ==
- Long jump: 6.63 m, NCAA Championships in Texas
- Triple jump:13.77m, Charlie Thomas Invitational meet in College Station, Texas.
- Long jump:6.57m, Ted Nelson Invitational in Texas.
