= Lydia Mato =

Ghanaian middle-distance runner

Lydia Mato is a Ghanaian middle- and long-distance runner who specializes in the 1000, 3000 and 5000 meters. She holds the national record in the 3000 meters with 9:31.97 minutes after winning the 2015 Nebraska Invitational, in May 2015. She became the first Ghanaian ever to win a US Cross County Championship at any level in US school system, during the US Cross Country Championship in 2014.

== Competition Record ==
Year	Competition	Venue	Position	Event	Notes
Representing Ghana
2014	2014 US Cross Country Championship	, United States	1st		
2015	NJCAA Region 6 (Regional) Championships	Ghana	2nd	800 m	
			1st	5000m	
			1st	3000m	
			1st	1000m	
1988	2015 Nebraska Invitational	,	1st	3000m	
