= Smiley face murder theory =

Alleged serial killings

The smiley face murder theory (also known as the smiley face murders, smiley face killings, and smiley face gang) is a theory advanced by retired New York City detectives Kevin Gannon and Anthony Duarte, as well as Dr. Lee Gilbertson, a criminal justice professor and gang expert at St. Cloud State University. It alleges that 45 young men found dead in bodies of water across several Midwestern American states from the late 1990s to the 2010s did not accidentally drown, as concluded by law enforcement agencies, but were victims of one or multiple serial killers.

The term "smiley face" became connected to the alleged murders when it was made public that the police had discovered graffiti depicting a smiley face near locations where they think the killer dumped the bodies in at least a dozen of the cases. Gannon wrote a textbook case study on the subject titled "Case Studies in Drowning Forensics." The response of law enforcement investigators and other experts has been largely skeptical.

== Gannon and Duarte's investigation ==
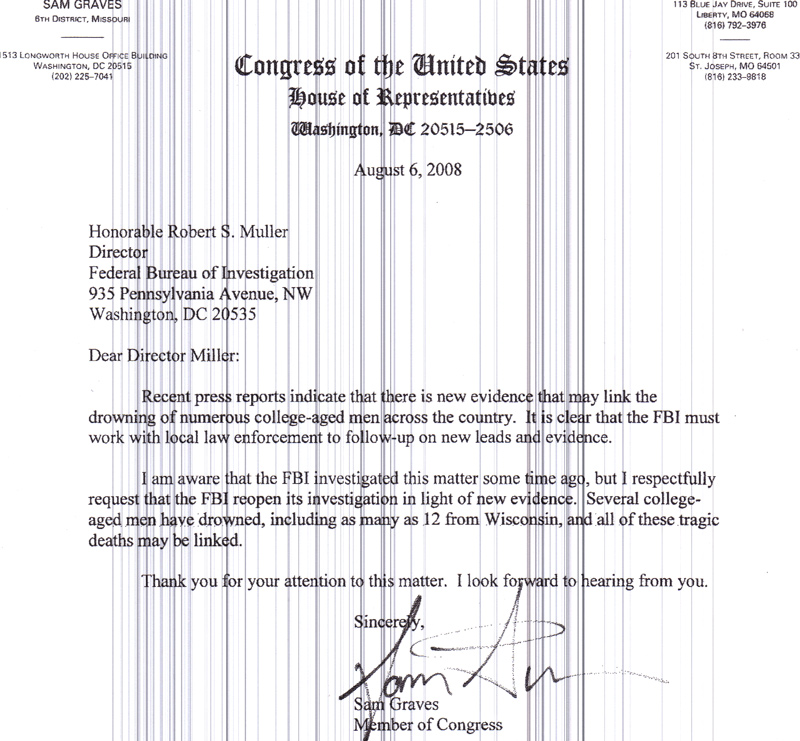
Letter from Congressman Sam Graves to FBI director Robert Mueller requesting the reopening of the case

As recently as 2017, Gannon and Duarte were examining evidence going back to the late 1990s that they believe connects the deaths of 45 college-age males whose dead bodies were found in water in 11 states, often after leaving parties or bars where they had been drinking. The men, according to the former detectives, often fit a profile of being popular, athletic, and successful students and most were white.

Gannon and Duarte have theorized that the young men were all murdered, either by an individual or by an organized group of killers. The term "smiley face" became connected to the alleged murders when it was made public that Gannon and Duarte had discovered graffiti depicting a smiley face near locations where they think the killer had dumped the bodies in at least a dozen of the cases. Furthermore, Gannon and Gilbertson claim to have found other types of graffiti symbols associated with the suspicious deaths, but have not disseminated these other images outside a few trusted law enforcement contacts for fear of inspiring copycat graffiti or alerting suspects.

== Reception of the theory ==
Other police forces that have investigated the deaths dispute the conclusion that the cases are linked. Police departments that are involved do not currently view the deaths associated with smiley faces present at the scenes as serial-killer activity. The La Crosse, Wisconsin, police department, which was in charge of eight of the investigations, concluded that the deaths were accidental drownings of inebriated men and stated that no smiley-face symbols were found in connection with any of the cases. The Center for Homicide Research published a research brief that also attempted to scientifically refute the theory. In March 2009, Lee Gilbertson, a criminal justice faculty member at St. Cloud State University, voiced his support for the theory on an episode of Larry King Live in which the alleged murders were discussed.

Criminal profiler Pat Brown calls the serial-killer theory "ludicrous," arguing that the evidence does not fit what is known about serial killers. Brown also believes that the smiley-face images found in some of the cases are likely nothing more than coincidences based upon guesses as to where the bodies entered the water, with smiley-face graffiti only found after a wide-area search. "It's not an unusual symbol," she told Minneapolis-based newspaper City Pages. "If you look in any area five miles square, I bet you could find a smiley face." Gilbertson and Gannon have disputed the idea that smiley-face graffiti is commonplace, saying they examined many areas nationwide that were and were not associated with suspicious deaths and rarely found smiley-face images.

The Federal Bureau of Investigation (FBI) issued the following statement:

The FBI has reviewed the information about the victims provided by two retired police detectives, who have dubbed these incidents the "Smiley Face Murders," and interviewed an individual who provided information to the detectives. To date, we have not developed any evidence to support links between these tragic deaths or any evidence substantiating the theory that these deaths are the work of a serial killer or killers. The vast majority of these instances appear to be alcohol-related drownings. The FBI will continue to work with the local police in the affected areas to provide support as requested.

— FBI National Press Office, FBI Statement Regarding Midwest River Deaths (April 29, 2008)

Ruben Rosario of the St. Paul Pioneer Press has questioned Gannon's motives, stating that Gannon has failed to provide any factual evidence that a group of killers exists. Rosario noted that Kristi Piehl, the original reporter on the theory, and some of the parents of the deceased have since expressed skepticism despite initially supporting the idea. Another parent, Kathy Geib, is working with Piehl and others, but their main goal is to convince police to take a second look at cases of alcohol-related drownings.

== In popular culture ==
- Gannon and Duarte's investigation is the subject of a 2019 docuseries, Smiley Face Killers: The Hunt for Justice, which aired on the Oxygen television network. Produced by Alison Dammann, the six episodes focus on cases of young men who have disappeared and whose bodies are found in a body of water some time later.
- British detective show Scott & Bailey had a series of episodes based on the deaths and ensuing theory.
- The 2017 novel Ill Will by Dan Chaon features a series of mysterious deaths involving drunk young white men whose bodies are found at the bottom of creeks and rivers.
- An episode of documentary series Breaking Homicide referenced the theory.
- The 2020 film Smiley Face Killers, directed by Tim Hunter and written by Bret Easton Ellis, is loosely inspired by the theory.

== See also ==
- Brian Shaffer; considered a possible victim of the killers.
- Luke Helder; the "Midwest Pipe Bomber" who planted pipe bombs across the United States in the shape of a gigantic smiley face.
- Manchester Pusher, similar alleged serial killer in the United Kingdom

General:

- List of fugitives from justice who disappeared
- List of serial killers in the United States
