= Powder Springs, Georgia =

- City
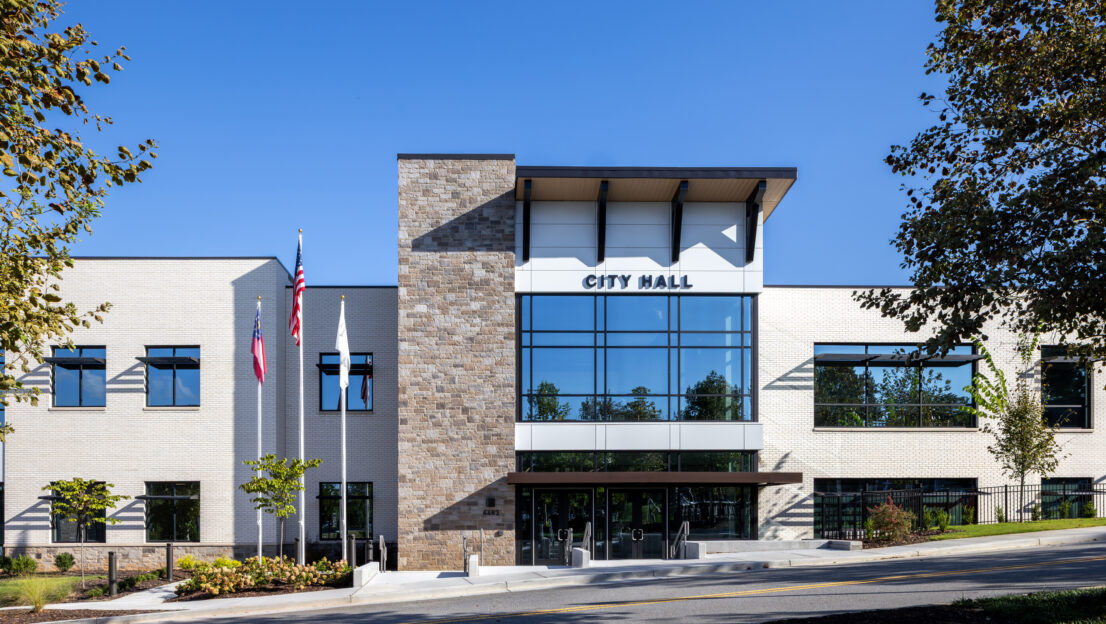
- Powder Springs City Hall
- Motto: "Small enough to know you...Large enough to serve you"
- Location in Cobb County and the state of Georgia
- Coordinates: 33°51′57″N 84°40′49″W
- Country: United States
- State: Georgia
- County: Cobb

Government
  - Mayor: Al Thurman

Area
  - Total: 7.44 sq mi (19.26 km^{2})
  - Land: 7.42 sq mi (19.23 km^{2})
  - Water: 0.012 sq mi (0.03 km^{2})
- Elevation: 945 ft (288 m)

Population (2020)
  - Total: 16,887
  - Density: 2,274.1/sq mi (878.03/km^{2})
- Time zone: UTC-5 (Eastern (EST))
  - Summer (DST): UTC-4 (EDT)
- ZIP code: 30127
- Area codes: 770/678/470
- FIPS code: 13-62524
- GNIS feature ID: 0356480
- Website: www.powderspringsga.gov

Powder Springs is a city in Cobb County, Georgia, United States. The population was 13,940 at the 2010 census, and 16,887 at the 2020 census. The 12,000-capacity Walter H. Cantrell Stadium is located in Powder Springs. It is used mostly for football and soccer matches.

== History ==
The town of Powder Springs was incorporated as Springville in 1838 in the lands of two Cherokee leaders. Gold had been discovered in Georgia 10 years earlier, and the first European-American settlers came to find gold. The settlers found little gold in the mines at Lost Mountain and off Brownsville Road. It was at about this time that the Cherokee people were forced off their land and removed to Indian Territory west of the Mississippi River on the Trail of Tears.

Springville was renamed Powder Springs in 1859. The name was derived from the seven springs in the city limits. The water in these springs contains some 26 minerals that turn the surrounding sand black like gunpowder – hence the earlier name of Gunpowder Springs.

Civil War history includes a skirmish at Lattermore's Mills on June 20, 1864, which was a part of the Battle of Kennesaw Mountain and General Sherman's Atlanta campaign. Many slaves escaped the plantations in this area to join Sherman's forces and gain freedom.

In 2015, the city elected its first black mayor, Al Thurman. He was the first African-American to be elected as a mayor in Cobb County, but was one of several elected in small towns in Georgia in 2015.

== Geography ==
Powder Springs is located in southwestern Cobb County at 33°51′57″N 84°40′49″W (33.865933, -84.680349). U.S. Route 278 (C. H. James Parkway) passes through the city west of its center, leading 5 miles (8 km) southeast to Austell and 11 miles (18 km) northwest to Dallas. Downtown Atlanta is 22 miles (35 km) to the east via US 278 and Interstate 20.

According to the United States Census Bureau, Powder Springs has a total area of 7.2 square miles (18.6 km^{2}), of which 0.01 square miles (0.03 km^{2}), or 0.17%, is water.

City of Powder Springs sign at Richard D Sailors Pkwy

== Demographics ==
Historical population
Census	Pop.	Note	%±
1890	262		—
1900	280		6.9%
1910	315		12.5%
1920	336		6.7%
1930	342		1.8%
1940	431		26.0%
1950	619		43.6%
1960	746		20.5%
1970	2,559		243.0%
1980	3,381		32.1%
1990	6,893		103.9%
2000	12,481		81.1%
2010	13,940		11.7%
2020	16,887		21.1%
2025 (est.)	21,004	▲	24.4%
U.S. Decennial Census; 1850-1870 1870-1880; 1890-1910 1920-1930; 1940 1950 1960; 1970 1980 1990; 2000 2010; 2025

=== 2020 census ===
As of the 2020 census, Powder Springs had a population of 16,887. The median age was 37.8 years. 24.6% of residents were under the age of 18 and 13.6% of residents were 65 years of age or older. For every 100 females there were 85.9 males, and for every 100 females age 18 and over there were 80.6 males age 18 and over.

100.0% of residents lived in urban areas, while 0.0% lived in rural areas.

There were 5,755 households in Powder Springs, of which 39.5% had children under the age of 18 living in them. Of all households, 46.8% were married-couple households, 13.7% were households with a male householder and no spouse or partner present, and 34.2% were households with a female householder and no spouse or partner present. About 20.4% of all households were made up of individuals and 9.0% had someone living alone who was 65 years of age or older. As of the 2020 census, there were 3,899 families residing in the city.

There were 5,998 housing units, of which 4.1% were vacant. The homeowner vacancy rate was 1.3% and the rental vacancy rate was 7.6%.

Powder Springs racial composition
Race	Num.	Perc.
White (non-Hispanic)	4,287	25.39%
Black or African American (non-Hispanic)	9,180	54.36%
Native American	38	0.23%
Asian	268	1.59%
Pacific Islander	6	0.04%
Other/Mixed	773	4.58%
Hispanic or Latino	2,335	13.83%

=== 2000 census ===
As of the census of 2000, there were 12,481 people, 4,004 households, and 3,267 families residing in the city. The population density was 1,969.2 inhabitants per square mile (760.3/km^{2}). There were 4,101 housing units at an average density of 647.0 units per square mile (249.8 units/km^{2}) The racial makeup of the city was 57.89% African American, 37.38% Caucasian, 0.20% Native American, 1.08% Asian, 0.06% Pacific Islander, 1.72% from other races, and 1.67% from two or more races. Hispanic or Latino of any race were 4.32% of the population.

There were 4,004 households, out of which 50.7% had children under the age of 18 living with them, 60.2% were married couples living together, 16.9% had a female householder with no husband present, and 18.4% were non-families. 14.7% of all households were made up of individuals. The average household size was 3.06 and the average family size was 3.39.

In the city, the population was spread out, with 33.8% under the age of 18, 6.6% from 18 to 24, 36.9% from 25 to 44, 16.3% from 45 to 64, and 6.3% who were 65 years of age or older. The median age was 32 years. For every 100 females, there were 90.0 males. For every 100 females age 18 and over, there were 82.3 males.

The median income for a household in the city was $56,486, and the median income for a family was $59,392. Males had a median income of $41,345 versus $31,774 for females. The per capita income for the city was $19,776. About 5.8% of families and 8.5% of the population were below the poverty line, including 11.8% of those under age 18 and 6.2% of those age 65 or over.

== Education ==
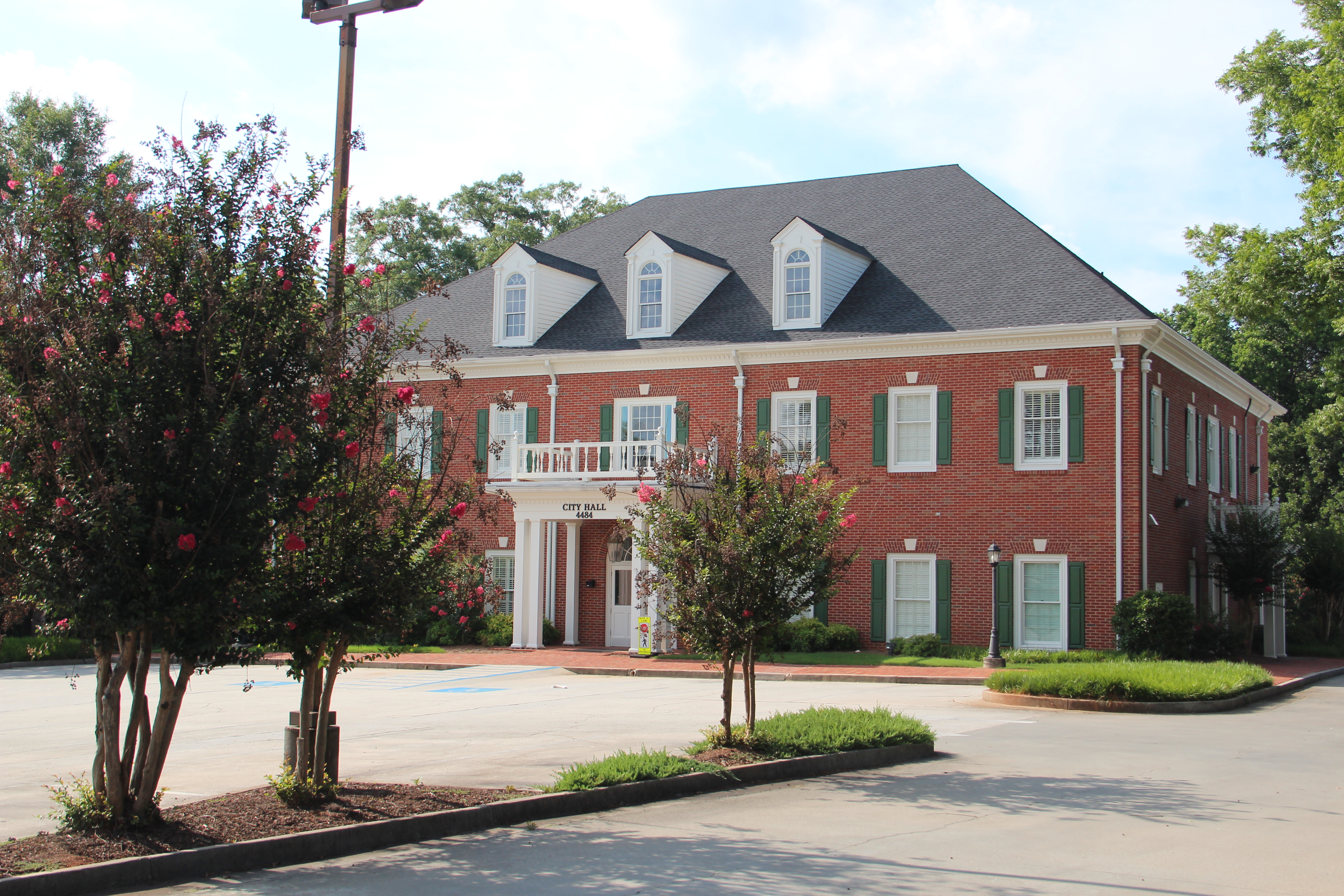
Powder Springs city hall

Powder Springs Public Schools are part of the Cobb County School District, including McEachern High School, located on the site of the former Native American burial ground and the former Seventh District Agricultural and Mechanical (A&M) School.

The late Georgia Senator Richard B. Russell attended the Seventh District A&M School. The administrative building of McEachern High School is named for Senator Russell.

Other schools in Powder Springs include Hillgrove High School, McEachern High School, Tapp Middle School, Dobbins Middle School, Powder Springs Elementary School, Lovinggood Middle School, Varner Elementary, Compton Elementary, Kemp Elementary, Still Elementary, and Vaughan Elementary.

== Media ==
The Bright Side is a newspaper serving Powder Springs and several other small cities.

== Notable people ==
- Rory Anderson (born 1992), former NFL tight end, selected in seventh round of 2015 NFL draft; played college football at South Carolina
- Gregg Bishop, film director, screenwriter and producer; born in Powder Springs
- Pat Cannon (1904–1966), United States Representative from Florida; born in Powder Springs
- Andrew Carleton (born 2000), soccer player
- Kenyan Drake (born 1994), running back in the National Football League, selected in third round of 2016 NFL draft; played college football at Alabama, where he was a three-time SEC champion (2012, 2014, 2015), a BCS national champion (2012), and CFP national champion (2015).
- Chuma Edoga (born 1997), offensive tackle for the Atlanta Falcons
- Evan Engram (born 1994), tight end for the Denver Broncos, selected in first round of 2017 NFL draft; played college football at Ole Miss
- Mark Lee (born 1973), guitarist for Christian rock band Third Day, born in Powder Springs
- Jason Lively (born 1967), actor, born in Powder Springs
- Robyn Lively (born 1972), actress; born in Powder Springs
- Shaquell Moore (born 1996), professional soccer player for FC Dallas, and the United States Men's National Team.
- Nimay Ndolo (born 1994), media personality and software developer
- Myles Rowe (born 2000), professional racing driver competing in the USF Pro 2000 Championship, the 2023 USF Pro 2000 Champion
- Taylor Trammell (born 1997), outfielder for Seattle Mariners
- Tiffany Whitton (born 1987), woman who lived in Powder Springs at the time of her 2013 disappearance
- Chig Okonkwo (born 1999), Tight End for the Tennessee Titans, selected 143rd overall in the fourth round of the 2022 NFL draft, played college football at the University of Maryland
