= Disappearance of Lars Mittank =

2014 incident in Varna, Bulgaria

Lars Joachim Mittank
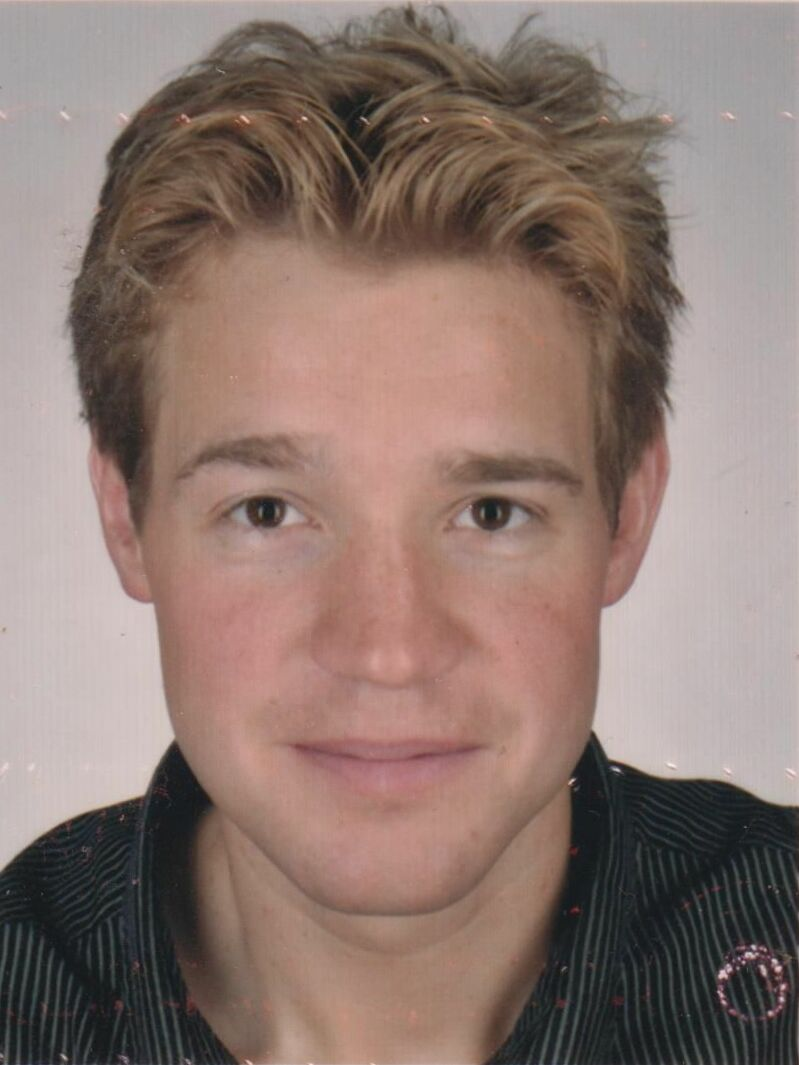
- Lars Mittank in 2013
- Born: 9 February 1986; Berlin, West Germany
- Disappeared: 8 July 2014 (aged 28); Varna, Bulgaria
- Status: Missing for 12 years, 4 months and 8 days
- Known for: Disappearing under mysterious circumstances

Lars Joachim Mittank (born 9 February 1986) is a German man who disappeared on 8 July 2014, near Varna Airport in Varna, Bulgaria. Mittank was on holiday at the Golden Sands resort, where he was supposedly involved in a fight, and was unable to fly home with his friends for health reasons. Mittank was documented acting strangely while alone in Bulgaria. He called home to his mother claiming that people were trying to kill him. On the day when he was supposed to fly home, Mittank went to the Varna Airport to consult a doctor. He was later seen on airport security footage running out of the airport and towards an adjacent forest. There have been no confirmed sightings since. The case has generated intense interest, and the frequency with which people viewed the footage of him fleeing the airport has led to him being named "the most famous missing person on YouTube".

== Background of Lars Mittank ==
Lars Mittank was born on 9 February 1986, in Berlin, Germany. He grew up in Itzehoe, Schleswig-Holstein, and lived there for his entire life. He worked at a power plant, had friends and a girlfriend. He visited his parents frequently. After his father suffered a stroke, he often helped at his parents' home after work. He was described as a normal person.

== Unusual behaviour and disappearance ==
Varna Airport, Bulgaria - The location that Lars Mittank disappeared from.

External videos
- CCTV footage from Varna Airport. Mittank's last confirmed sighting.

On 30 June 2014, 28-year-old Mittank travelled with five of his friends to Varna, Bulgaria. It was his first journey outside of Germany. The group was on holiday at the Golden Sands, a popular seaside resort just outside of the city of Varna. "The week went by really fast", said Paul Rohmann, one of Mittank's friends, on German television in 2016. "We relaxed on the beach, swam in the pool, played football, went clubbing. He was relaxed. He was in a good mood." Another friend, Tim Schuldt, said that Mittank did not eat much, and that he would have only a small bowl of soup or a small salad at a time. His friends reported no additional abnormal behaviour by Mittank until the final part of the trip.

On 6 July 2014, the day before they were supposed to return home, Mittank and his companions were at a bar in town, and Mittank got into a disagreement with some other German nationals over football. Mittank, a fan of the football club SV Werder Bremen, had differences with fans of FC Bayern Munich. He then parted from his friends outside a restaurant after leaving the bar, and disappeared for the rest of the night. Mittank turned up at the resort the following morning and told his friends he was beaten up by four men hired by the group in the bar whom he disagreed with the night before. The fight resulted in Mittank suffering an injured jaw and a ruptured eardrum. He went and saw a doctor who advised him not to fly due to his injury, and prescribed the antibiotic Cefprozil (500 mg). Mittank's friends wanted to stay with him, but he insisted he was fine on his own, and told them to follow the original travel plan and fly home on 7 July, which they did.

Mittank checked out of the resort the same time as his friends, and checked into the Hotel Color Varna for one night. The hotel was cheap and close to the airport. However, a day after his friends left, he began to act paranoid. While at the hotel, Mittank called his mother, Sandra Mittank. In a whisper, he told her that people were trying to kill or rob him and that she should cancel his credit cards. The closed-circuit television cameras in the hotel recorded him pacing up and down the halls, looking out windows, and hiding in an elevator. At 1:00 a.m., he left the hotel before returning about an hour later. It is not known what he did in the intervening period. In the morning, he once again called his mother, telling her that the people pursuing him were getting closer.

Mittank was last seen at Varna Airport on 8 July 2014, the day that he was hoping to fly home to Germany. He texted his mother that he had arrived at the airport. Mittank went to consult with the airport doctor, Kosta Kostov. Kostov later described his behaviour as "nervous and erratic". According to Kostov, he told Mittank that he was fine and could return home. However, Mittank did not leave his office, expressing doubt about the medication that he was taking. At that time, a construction worker entered the office. The airport was undergoing renovation at the time. Kostov said that Mittank then began to tremble. He yelled: "I don't want to die here! I have to get out of here!" Mittank then got up and fled the office. He left behind all of his luggage, which included his wallet, mobile phone, and passport. Mittank was captured by airport security cameras fleeing the terminal. Once outside, he can be seen on the footage jogging away from the airport, climbing a fence, running into a meadow, and sprinting off camera in the direction of an adjacent forest. That is his last confirmed location.

== Speculation and subsequent developments ==
There is no definitive agreement among experts and family members as to the causes of Mittank's behaviour and to what extent his paranoia was rooted in reality. Mittank's mother, alongside Bulgarian and German doctors, have suspected that Mittank's unusual behaviour was the result of a rare side effect from the antibiotic that he was prescribed, Cefprozil. A cephalosporin, it has been known to induce psychotic side effects, including hallucinations and paranoia. However, according to Kostov, Mittank had not been taking his medication. "He didn't take those antibiotics. He didn't even fill out his prescription", Kostov said. "So his behaviour couldn't have been a result of that. I can't think of a single reason why he left my office in such a panic. I'm still confused." His mother said that he had no history of mental illness. However, a psychological breakdown caused by an undiagnosed mental illness has been discussed as a possible explanation for his conduct.

It is also unknown what happened to Mittank after he fled the airport. With the police unable to determine Lars Mittank's fate, Sandra Mittank hired a private investigator, Andreas Gütig. He checked hospital records for patients without identification, but found nothing. Mittank had experience in hunting, fishing, and trapping, but there is skepticism about whether he would have been able to survive for long outdoors due to intense heat in the summers and lack of food. His mother has expressed belief that he is still alive, possibly having lost his memory. About a year after his disappearance, a truck driver thought he saw him hitchhiking in Varna. There have been multiple reported sightings of him in several other countries, but none have been confirmed. In 2019, a German truck driver gave a hitchhiker a ride from Dresden to Schildow in Oberhavel, Brandenburg. The driver became aware of the Mittank case later, and said that the man with him resembled an older version of Mittank. The driver said that the man had long hair and a beard. He said that his eyes seemed tired and his cheekbones were prominent.

Mittank has been described as "the most famous missing person on YouTube". By May 2018, less than four years after his disappearance, the security footage of him in the airport had been viewed more than 16 million times. The mysterious nature of the case has led to frequent discussions and the growth of numerous theories. The case remains unsolved.

Mittank is listed as 180 centimetres (5 ft 11 in) tall with dark blond hair. He has a scar on his left forearm.

== See also ==
- Disappearance of Stoyan Kostov – another high-profile disappearance of a man in Bulgaria, which has led to an international search. It was later discovered that his partner at the time of his disappearance was British murderer Dena Thompson.
- List of people who disappeared mysteriously (2000–present)
