= Disappearance of Rebecca Coriam =

2011 disappearance from cruise ship

Rebecca Coriam
- Coriam in an undated photo
- Born: 11 March 1987; Chester, England
- Disappeared: 22 March 2011 (aged 24); Disney Wonder
- Status: Missing for 15 years, 6 months and 17 days
- Occupation: Cruise ship crew

On 22 March 2011, Rebecca Coriam, a 24-year-old British crew member, disappeared while serving aboard the Disney Wonder, a cruise ship operated by Disney Cruise Line. She was last seen on CCTV in the crew lounge that morning, appearing distressed during a phone call. Several hours later, she failed to report for duty and could not be located on board. Her disappearance was the first such incident in the history of Disney Cruise Line.

Coriam's whereabouts remain unknown, and the case is still under investigation. Her parents have criticised Disney's handling of the inquiry, alleging that the company prioritised reputation management over transparency and cooperation. In 2016, the family settled a civil claim against Disney out of court.

The Coriam family have received support from British government officials advocating for improved investigative protocols in cases of missing persons at sea, and from campaigners representing the families of other crew and passengers reported missing from cruise ships.

== Life ==
Rebecca Coriam was born on 11 March 1987 at the Countess of Chester Hospital in Chester. She grew up in Chester with her parents Annmaria and Mike, sister Rachael, and two foster brothers. She graduated from Chester Catholic High School. In her youth, she also worked at Chester Zoo, where other relatives had worked; a memorial bench to her grandparents, Kevin and Dolores, is on the zoo grounds. She joined the Air Cadets at 610 City of Chester Squadron in her teens and attended Plymouth University, where she studied sports science. She later got a Staff Volunteer position within the cadets and participated in some outdoor events.

Coriam undertook youth studies at Liverpool Hope University, then moved to the U.S. for four months to teach sports at Camp America in Maine. In June 2010, she went to London for a Disney Cruise job interview, then received training at the company's theme parks in Florida after being hired. After four months on cruises to the Bahamas, where the ships are registered, she went back to England for two months off. When she returned to work, it was on the Disney Wonder, based in the Port of Los Angeles. She visited all its ports of call on the Mexican Riviera and went through the Panama Canal. She returned to Chester for two weeks during this period when her grandfather died, which was the last time her family saw her in person.

== Disappearance ==
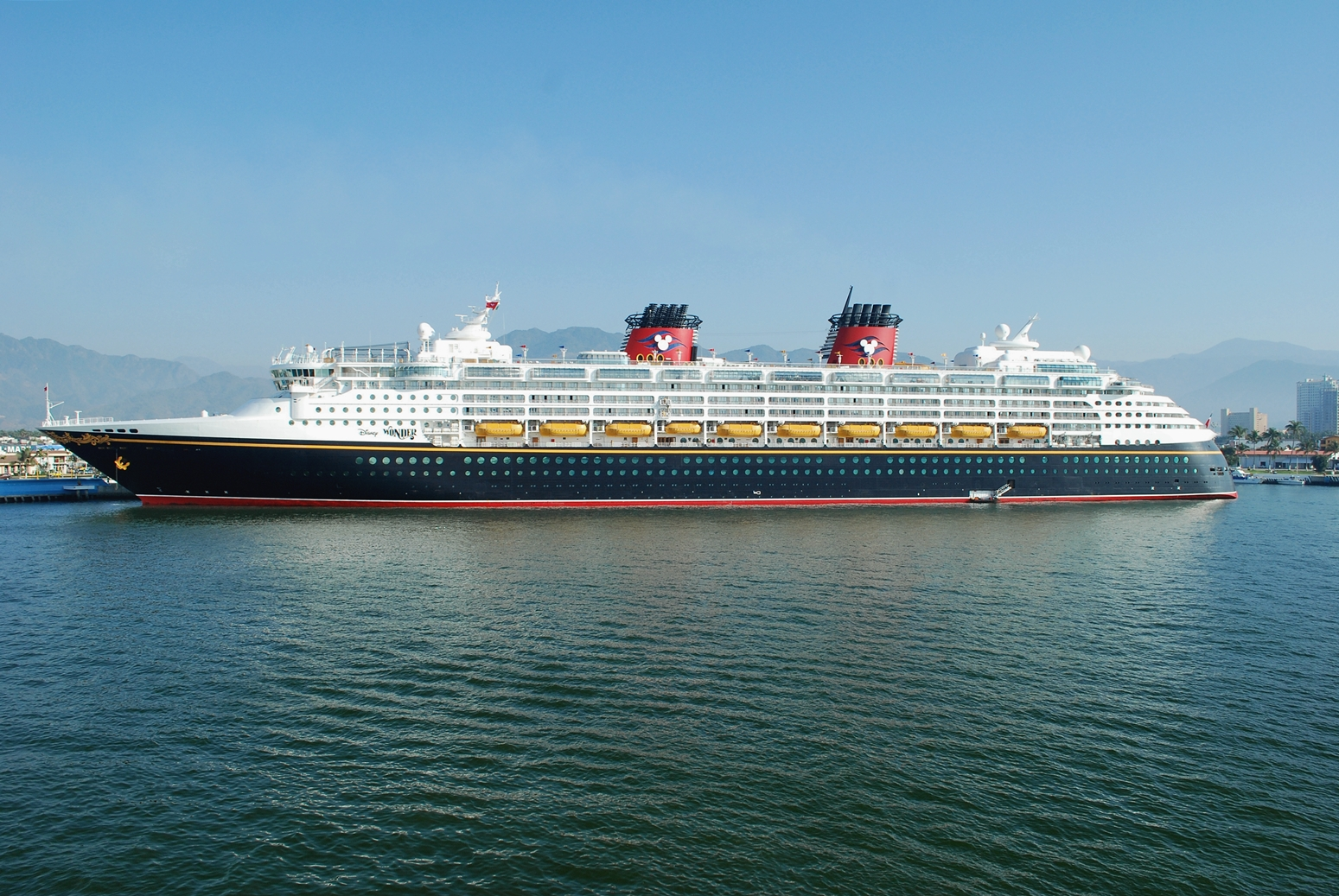
Disney Wonder in February 2011

Coriam returned to the Wonder and her duties as a youth worker, maintaining contact with her family via Facebook and Skype. On the day the ship left Los Angeles six weeks later, 21 March 2011, she sent what would be her last message to her parents via Facebook to tell them she would call them the next day. Her mother became concerned when, following her reply, 12 hours went by without a response.

At 9 am Pacific Daylight Time on 22 March, while the Wonder was off the coast of Mexico en route to Puerto Vallarta and Cabo San Lucas, Coriam failed to report for the start of her shift. She was not in her cabin or anywhere else on the ship, and did not respond to being paged over the ship's PA system. A review of CCTV footage found one appearance of her at 5:45 am. An early but unverified account, purportedly from another crew member, claimed she had gone overboard at 3 am. In the video, Coriam is talking on one of the ship's internal phones in a crew area and appears distraught. A young man walks up to her and appears to ask if everything is all right, and her mouth can clearly be read saying, "Yeah, fine." She then hangs up the phone and walks away, pushing her hair back and putting her hands in her back pockets, mannerisms her parents say were common for her. There has been no record of her presence anywhere since then.

== Investigations ==
The crew searched the Wonder for Coriam while ships from both the U.S. Coast Guard and Mexican Navy unsuccessfully searched the international waters through which the Wonder had been sailing during the hours when she could have potentially gone overboard.

Since the Wonder is registered in the Bahamas, a detective from the Royal Bahamas Police Force (RBPF) flew to the ship to investigate once it had returned to Los Angeles three days after the disappearance. He was reported to have undertaken "several days of onboard investigations". Coriam's parents were flown out from England to meet the ship when it returned. They met the Bahamian detective and said he told them he had spent only one day on board investigating before flying back home. The detective also told them that he had interviewed only a few crew members and none of the passengers. They claimed Disney kept them in a car with blacked-out windows and brought them on board via a rarely-used side entrance after all the passengers had disembarked. The Wonder's captain gave his condolences and expressed his theory that Coriam had been washed overboard by a wave while at the crew pool, a theory her parents doubted due to the high walls around it. After that, they were taken to a meeting with Disney executives and the woman Coriam had been speaking to on the phone.

On the day before the first anniversary of her disappearance, Coriam's father received an email from a woman who claimed she had seen Coriam with a dark-haired man on the street in Venice the previous August. The woman said she was "85% sure" it was Coriam and that seeing the family's website had jogged her memory. Coriam's uncle said, "It was just an email but it seemed legitimate. It was very upsetting for everyone to think she could be out there somewhere after all this time." He wondered how she could have gotten there without her passport, which had been among the belongings her parents recovered from her quarters.

=== The Guardian article ===
In October 2011, Welsh-American journalist and author Jon Ronson took the Wonder along the same route and made discreet inquiries while aboard. With the Coriams' permission, he wrote about his experience in The Guardian. Several crew members who had been on the ship at the time of Coriam's disappearance, none of whom wanted their names used, spoke to him and suggested that more was known about her fate than Disney or the Bahamanian police were publicly admitting. Many were circumspect, with one bartender telling Ronson, "It didn't happen. You know that's the answer I have to give." After touring the areas of the ship open to passengers, Ronson decided that Coriam had probably slipped and fallen while jogging on the Deck 4 jogging track. The railings there were low enough for such an accident to happen, and she regularly kept herself in shape by jogging. However, the track was well covered by disguised security cameras. Ronson shared this theory with a deck worker, who told him he was mistaken and that Coriam had actually gone overboard from the crew pool on Deck 5. The worker told him, "I was on the ship that day. Everyone knows." He cited a flip-flop found in the area as proof. Ronson returned home to find that a woman the Coriams had told to contact him had done so using the false name "Melissa" and told him that flowers were placed on the wall near the pool, apparently by the company, the day after Coriam's disappearance. The woman said, "It really stirred things up. Why were they putting them there? Nothing was clear."

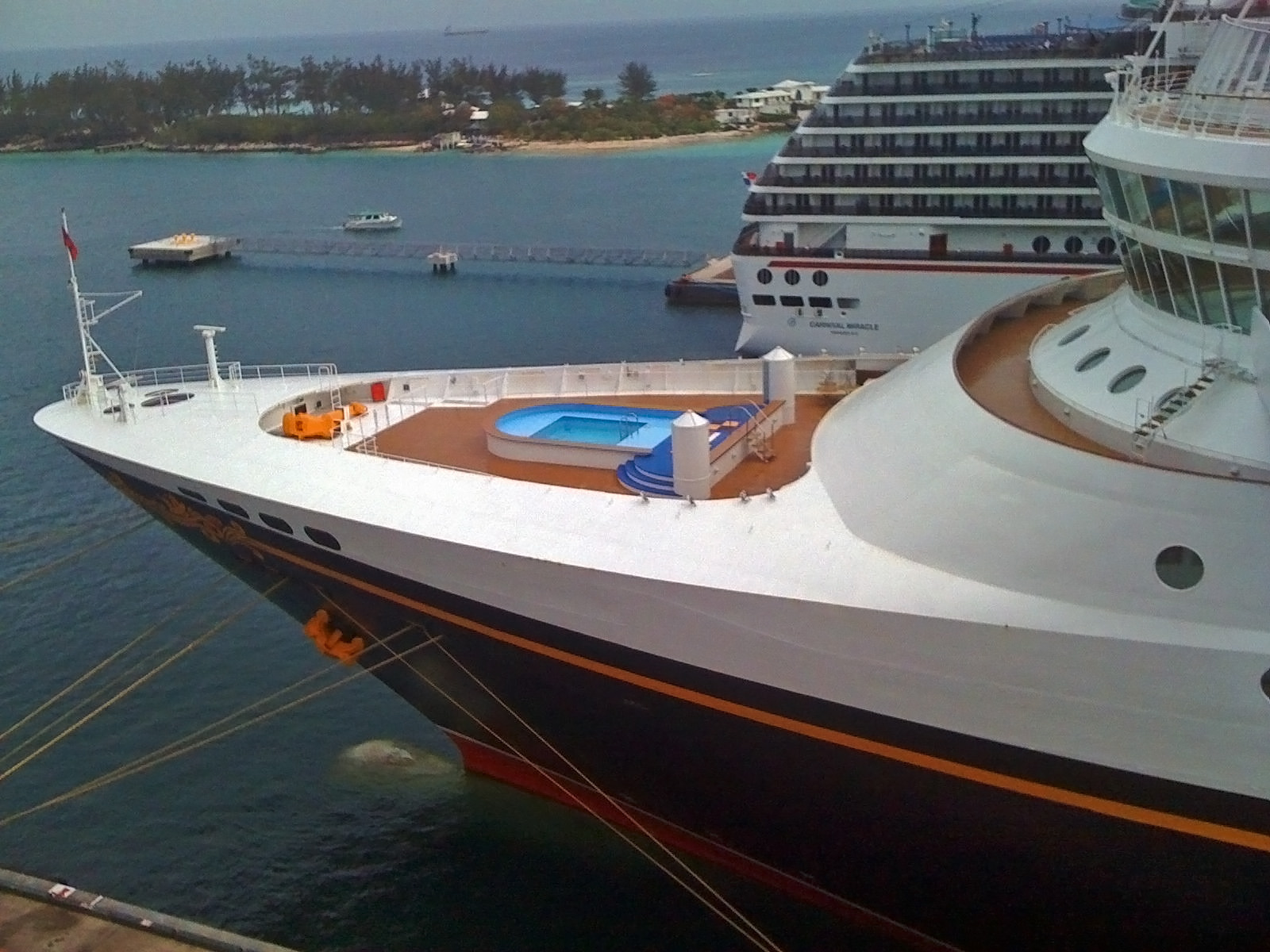
The Disney Wonder's crew pool, from where many crew members claimed Rebecca went overboard

When Ronson took a look at the crew pool, visible from the fore of Deck 10, he doubted these claims. Around the railings on the pool is a steel wall high enough to completely block any view, and another crew member had told him it was a popular place to go when not working as their cabins were very small and it was a place crew members could relax away from guests. There were also conspicuously mounted security cameras there. Although Ronson allowed for the theory that the cameras could have been placed there after the incident, he did not see how anyone could have jumped or fallen from the area. All crew members who spoke with Ronson insisted that Coriam had gone overboard from the crew pool, with one telling him, "Disney knows exactly what happened. Everything here is taped. There's CCTV everywhere. Disney has the tape." Near the end of a voyage, another crew member who sought him out explained in further detail that even though the walls around the pool are high, the seas were rough at the time and she could have been tossed off the ship, especially if the deck and walls were slippery. The worker said a friend of his once had to guide an employee inside under similar conditions, and the offence of being outside on the pool deck in such conditions was serious enough that Disney sent that employee home.

== Theories ==
Since Coriam was not found on the ship after a thorough search, investigators concluded that she went overboard, possibly as a result of a rogue wave. The Coriams and their lawyer say they never received a copy of the final report as they were promised by Bahamian police, and British detectives who did receive it have refused repeated Freedom of Information Act requests for a copy on the grounds that it contains restricted personal information.

A crew member told Ronson that Coriam's phone call was taped, and that several others believed it was with a romantic partner. Melissa told him, "She was in a relationship, and there were problems, and it was upsetting her. It was a very, very intense relationship. It was great and then it was awful [...] I can't think of any other reason why she'd have been upset and wandering around by herself at 6 am." However, she said that Coriam was on the phone not with the partner but with a mutual friend. On the anniversary of Coriam's disappearance, her parents told the Liverpool Echo that they heard the names of a young woman and older man on the ship mentioned as possibly being involved in a love triangle with her, and called for them to come forward. They also disclosed that they had heard Disney had sent some additional footage to the FBI for enhancement, but could not say what that footage might contain.

Coriam's parents recall her personality as constantly cheerful and upbeat, traits that got her the Disney job in the first place. When they visited her quarters after the disappearance, they found passes she had obtained for them and her sister to visit Disneyland Paris, a gift trip she was apparently planning to surprise them with on her next break. These plans, as well as her continuous Facebook exchanges with her mother, convinced them that she was not considering suicide. Melissa, who had last seen Coriam at 11 pm the previous night, told Ronson that she believed Coriam went out to the crew pool (one of her favourite places on the ship) to be alone and relax for a while. While there, she may have climbed up and sat on the wall before falling as she was "a bit of a risk taker".

However, Melissa was dismissive of the suggestion that the slippers allegedly found near the pool (which were included among the belongings returned to Coriam's parents) had been hers. She told Ronson, "Mike and Ann showed them to me. They were too big. They weren't her style. They were pink and flowery and Hawaiian. I'd never seen her wear them. Why didn't Disney come to me or her girlfriend and say, 'Can you identify these as Bex's?'" While the Coriams later claimed the flip-flops were too small, they were unable to find anyone on the ship who had seen her wearing them and learned that no forensics had been done on them.

In 2016, private investigators working for the family said that they had conclusively established that the footwear did not belong to Coriam. Not only were they not in a style she would wear, but they had another crewmember's name and cabin number written on them. The Coriams said this led them to strongly doubt Disney's claim that they had been found in the pool area, as well as its theory that Rebecca was swept or fell overboard from there. It was also noted that in the video of the phone call, Rebecca's clothes appear much too big for her; her friends and fellow crew have speculated that they may have been someone else's.

Former City of Chester MP Chris Matheson believes Coriam was the victim of a crime and was possibly sexually assaulted or murdered. He told the Liverpool Echo in 2015, "The more you look into this, the more it smells rotten—the more it smells like a crime has taken place." He claims to have a copy of the original police report with "compelling" evidence to support his claim. John Anderson, a private investigator who has worked with both the Coriams and Matheson, says records show the seas around the Wonder were normal that night, casting doubt on Disney's "rogue wave" claim. He also says that any wave capable of taking Coriam off the ship would have caused visible damage to it as well.

Former Deputy Prime Minister Baron John Prescott also took an interest in the case. He believed Rebecca was thrown overboard rather than having fallen. He also called for laws that would allow British authorities to investigate their own citizens' deaths on cruise ships in international waters.

== Criticism of investigation ==
Ronson reported that, at the time his article was published, the Coriams had received no further updates from Disney or the RBPF on the progress of the investigation. Her father said, "Whenever we call anyone, all they say is, 'The investigation is ongoing.' We've tried emailing, telling them how we feel, how it's getting harder ... but nothing. Just, 'It's ongoing.'" The Bahamian police officer assigned to the case never returned Ronson's calls.

The Coriams have been joined in their criticism of the investigation by British government officials, Coriam's friends among the crew, and advocates for victims of other incidents on cruise ships and their families. The latter especially noted that 170 passengers and crew have disappeared from cruise ships since 2000, many without being seriously investigated or widely reported. All critics contend that Disney, like other cruise operators, is more interested in avoiding adverse publicity related to these incidents than anything else.

In November 2011, the Coriams' local MP at the time Stephen Mosley brought the case up in the House of Commons, telling Minister for Shipping Mike Penning that "the investigation into Rebecca's disappearance was appalling". He stated that the "Bahamian authorities made virtually no attempt at investigating Rebecca's disappearance" and said the RBPF was "internationally recognised as almost toothless [...] very few people know when they board a cruise ship that they are so poorly protected". Countries such as the Bahamas, often criticized for the lax standards of such "flag of convenience" ship registrations, did not have the investigative capabilities to deal with such incidents.

Penning responded by announcing that the Marine Accident Investigation Branch would investigate all deaths or disappearances of British citizens from vessels anywhere in the world, paralleling similar legislation signed by U.S. President Barack Obama that gives the FBI the same authority in the event of the death or disappearance of any American citizen. The government would also work through the International Maritime Organization to increase international cooperation on such investigations. Penning, too, was critical of Disney and said the company was "more interested in getting the ship back to sea than in investigating the case of the missing member of their crew".

Kendall Carver, an American who founded the lobbying group International Cruise Victims after his own daughter's 2004 disappearance from the Celebrity Mercury, said, "In other corporations, police get involved. On cruise ships they have, quote, security officers, but they work for the cruise lines. They aren't going to do anything when the lines get sued." Miami lawyer Jim Walker, who publishes the highly critical blog Cruise Law News, agreed; he commented on Ronson's article to say that "the Coriam family does not deserve Mickey Mouse games". Walker later represented the Coriams in a suit against Disney in American courts; they settled with the company in 2015 for an undisclosed sum and an agreement not to discuss the case publicly.

Carver and Walker both believe Disney has more evidence than it has shown, particularly security footage of the area by the pool, and is covering up knowledge of what happened out of fear of adverse publicity. Carver told Ronson, "If there's a video that shows your daughter going overboard, that's the end of the story. There's no way someone can go off a ship and it not be recorded." Melissa told Ronson it was implausible that there was no footage since the pool is close to a number of other important offices housing sensitive documents, such as HR and payroll. She believed any cover-up by Disney may have been as much about protecting themselves from charges of negligence, since the pool is just below the ship's bridge and would thus be the portion of the ship where a fall would most likely be seen by someone in a position to start a rescue. She told Ronson, "If it was 6 a.m. and they were doing their job and watching the front, someone must have seen her go over. Or if they didn't, they're covering up why they didn't."

Disney told Ronson that they are deferring to the RBPF. He said, "They have told us the investigation is still ongoing. They have not shared a timeline with us, either." Their spokesperson refused to comment on specifics about whether a tape of the phone call or additional security camera video exists, stating, "We wish we knew what happened as much as anyone [...] Rebecca's disappearance has been difficult and heartbreaking for everyone."

== See also ==
- Disappearance of Sarm Heslop
- Incidents at Walt Disney World
- List of people who disappeared mysteriously at sea
