= 2024 African Championships in Athletics – Women's long jump =

Women's long jump at the 2024 African Championships in Athletics
- Venue: Japoma Stadium
- Location: Douala, Cameroon
- Dates: 23 June
- Competitors: 13 from 10 nations
- Winning distance: 6.73 m

Medalists
gold medal	Ese Brume	Nigeria
silver medal	Marthe Koala	Burkina Faso
bronze medal	Danielle Nolte	South Africa

The women's long jump event at the 2024 African Championships in Athletics was held on 23 June in Douala, Cameroon.

== Records ==
Records before the 2024 African Athletics Championships
Record	Athlete (nation)	Distance (m)	Location	Date
World record	Galina Chistyakova (URS)	7.52	Leningrad, Soviet Union	11 June 1988
African record	Ese Brume (NGR)	7.17	Chula Vista, United States	29 May 2021
Championship record	Blessing Okagbare (NGR)	6.96	Porto-Novo, Benin	30 June 2012
World leading	Malaika Mihambo (GER)	7.22	Rome, Italy	12 June 2024
African leading	Agate de Sousa (STP)	6.88	Lisbon, Portugal	25 April 2024

== Results ==
Rank	Athlete	Nationality	#1	#2	#3	#4	#5	#6	Result	Notes
1st place, gold medalist(s)	Ese Brume	Nigeria	6.49	6.28	6.62	6.51w	6.47	6.73	6.73	
2nd place, silver medalist(s)	Marthe Koala	Burkina Faso	6.48	x	6.39	6.61	6.72	6.53	6.72	
3rd place, bronze medalist(s)	Danielle Nolte	South Africa	6.15	6.17	x	6.30	6.44	6.40	6.44	
4	Prestina Ochonogor	Nigeria	6.01	6.19	6.10	6.28	5.91	5.98	6.28	
5	Esraa Owis	Egypt	x	6.14	6.28	6.15	x	x	6.28	
6	Tshegofatso Bojosi	Botswana	6.14	5.90	6.07	6.05	6.07	5.98	6.14	
7	Aniella Delafosse	Ivory Coast	6.06	x	x	x	x	x	6.06	
8	Yousra Lajdoud	Morocco	x	5.94	5.90	5.67	5.98	5.65	5.98	
9	Fayza Issaka Abdou Kerim	Togo	5.89	5.51	5.85				5.89	
10	Michelle Fokam	Cameroon	5.87	5.83	5.81				5.87	
11	Aster Tolosa	Ethiopia	5.19	5.14	5.10				5.19	
12	Kevine Linda Kouoche	Cameroon	x	3.20	x				3.20	
	Nemata Nikiema	Burkina Faso	x	x	x				NM	
	Zeddy Chesire Chongwo	Kenya							DNS	

== See also ==
- Athletics at the 2023 African Games – Women's long jump
