= 2024 African Championships in Athletics – Women's heptathlon =

Women's heptathlon at the 2024 African Championships in Athletics
- Venue: Japoma Stadium
- Location: Douala, Cameroon
- Dates: 21-22 June
- Competitors: 4 from 4 nations
- Winning score: 5777 pts

Medalists
gold medal	Odile Ahouanwanou	Benin
silver medal	Adèle Mafogang	Cameroon
bronze medal	Shannon Verster	South Africa

The women's heptathlon event at the 2024 African Championships in Athletics was held on 21 and 22 June in Douala, Cameroon.

== Records ==
Records before the 2024 African Athletics Championships
Record	Athlete (nation)	Points	Location	Date
World record	Jackie Joyner-Kersee (USA)	7291	Seoul, South Korea	24 September 1998
African record	Sunette Viljoen (SLE)	6462	Arles, France	30 May 1999
Championship record	Uhunoma Osazuwa (NGR)	6153	Durban, South Africa	25 June 2016
World leading	Nafissatou Thiam (BEL)	6848	Rome, Italy	8 June 2024
African leading	No scores recorded			

== Medalists ==
Gold	Silver	Bronze
Odile Ahouanwanou; Benin	Adèle Mafogang; Cameroon	Shannon Verster; South Africa

== Results ==
=== 100 metres hurdles ===
Wind: +0.4 m/s

Rank	Lane	Name	Nationality	Time	Points	Notes
1	3	Odile Ahouanwanou	Benin	14.13	960	
2	6	Shannon Verster	South Africa	14.39	924	
3	4	Adèle Mafogang	Cameroon	15.02	839	
4	7	Nada Chroudi	Tunisia	17.34	559	
	5	Kemi Francis-Petersen	Nigeria	DNS	0	

=== High jump ===
Rank	Athlete	Nationality	1.48	1.54	1.57	1.60	1.63	1.66	1.69	1.72	1.75	1.78	Result	Points	Notes	Total
1	Odile Ahouanwanou	Benin	–	–	o	–	–	o	o	xxo	xo	xxx	1.75	916		1876
2	Shannon Verster	South Africa	–	–	–	–	o	–	xo	xxo	xxx		1.72	879		1803
3	Adèle Mafogang	Cameroon	–	o	o	o	o	o	o	xxx			1.69	842		1681
4	Nada Chroudi	Tunisia	o	xo	xo	xo	xxx						1.60	736		1295

=== Shot put ===
Rank	Athlete	Nationality	#1	#2	#3	Result	Points	Notes	Total
1	Odile Ahouanwanou	Benin	13.29	13.85	14.76	14.76	845		2721
2	Nada Chroudi	Tunisia	13.13	13.60	12.95	13.60	767		2027
3	Adèle Mafogang	Cameroon	11.67	11.81	11.13	11.81	649		2330
4	Shannon Verster	South Africa	9.72	11.01	10.66	11.01	596		2399

=== 200 metres ===
Wind: +0.5 m/s

Rank	Lane	Name	Nationality	Time	Points	Notes	Total
1	6	Odile Ahouanwanou	Benin	25.45	846		3567
2	7	Shannon Verster	South Africa	25.59	833		3232
3	3	Adèle Mafogang	Cameroon	25.83	812		3142
4	5	Nada Chroudi	Tunisia	26.52	752		2779

=== Long jump ===
Rank	Athlete	Nationality	#1	#2	#3	Result	Points	Notes	Total
1	Adèle Mafogang	Cameroon	5.78	5.44	5.90	5.90	819		3961
2	Nada Chroudi	Tunisia	5.29	5.55	5.65	5.65	744		3523
3	Odile Ahouanwanou	Benin	5.52	x	5.43	5.52	706		4273
4	Shannon Verster	South Africa	5.15	x	5.35	5.35	657		3889

=== Javelin throw ===
Rank	Athlete	Nationality	#1	#2	#3	Result	Points	Notes	Total
1	Odile Ahouanwanou	Benin	40.46	39.72	42.56	42.56	716		4989
2	Adèle Mafogang	Cameroon	41.37	40.16	x	41.37	694		4655
3	Nada Chroudi	Tunisia	40.01	40.36	39.03	40.36	674		4197
4	Shannon Verster	South Africa	29.31	33.77	31.27	33.77	548		4437

=== 800 metres ===
Rank	Name	Nationality	Time	Points	Notes
1	Adèle Mafogang	Cameroon	2:16.50	872	
2	Shannon Verster	South Africa	2:21.59	802	
3	Odile Ahouanwanou	Benin	2:22.61	788	
4	Nada Chroudi	Tunisia	2:30.94	681	

=== Final standings ===
The highest mark recorded in each event is highlighted in yellow

Rank	Athlete	Nationality	100m H	HJ	SP	200m	LJ	JT	800m	Points	Notes
1st place, gold medalist(s)	Odile Ahouanwanou	Benin	14.13	1.75	14.76	25.45	5.52	42.56	2:22.61	5777	
2nd place, silver medalist(s)	Adèle Mafogang	Cameroon	15.02	1.69	11.81	25.83	5.90	41.37	2:16.50	5527	NR
3rd place, bronze medalist(s)	Shannon Verster	South Africa	14.39	1.72	11.01	25.59	5.35	33.77	2:21.59	5239	
4	Nada Chroudi	Tunisia	17.34	1.57	13.60	26.52	5.65	40.36	2:30.94	4913	
	Kemi Francis-Petersen	Nigeria	DNS	–	–	–	–	–	–	DNS	

== See also ==
- Athletics at the 2023 African Games – Women's heptathlon
