= 2026 African Championships in Athletics – Women's long jump =

Women's long jump at the 2026 African Championships in Athletics
- Venue: Legon Sports Stadium
- Location: Accra, Ghana
- Dates: 14 May
- Competitors: 15 from 11 nations
- Winning time: 6.76w

Medalists
gold medal	Nemata Nikiema	Burkina Faso
silver medal	Marthe Koala	Burkina Faso
bronze medal	Marie-Jeanne Ourega	Ivory Coast

The women's long jump event at the 2026 African Championships in Athletics was held on 14 May in Accra, Ghana.

== Results ==
Rank	Athlete	Nationality	#1	#2	#3	#4	#5	#6	Result	Notes
1st place, gold medalist(s)	Nemata Nikiema	Burkina Faso							6.76w	
2nd place, silver medalist(s)	Marthe Koala	Burkina Faso							6.75	
3rd place, bronze medalist(s)	Marie-Jeanne Ourega	Ivory Coast							6.70w	
4	Ruth Usoro	Nigeria							6.69w	
5	Esraa Owis	Egypt							6.45w	
6	Danielle Nolte	South Africa							6.21w	
7	Tshegofatso Bojosi	Botswana							6.18w	
8	Véronique Kossenda Rey	Cameroon							6.15w	
9	Fayza Issaka Abdoukerim	Togo							5.96w	
10	Favour Olise	Nigeria							5.89w	
11	Betselot Alemayehu	Ethiopia							5.86w	
12	Faith Jepkemboi Kipsang	Kenya							5.83w	
13	Frieda Iithete	Namibia							5.70	
14	Awa Zongo	Burkina Faso							5.65w	
15	Martha Monyenche Nyabuto	Kenya							5.37w	
	Jedilesse Baleba Ntini	Republic of the Congo							DNS	
