= 2025 World Athletics Championships – Women's long jump =

Women's long jump at the 2025 World Athletics Championships
- Venue: National Stadium
- Location: Tokyo, Japan
- Dates: 13 September (qualification); 14 September (final)
- Competitors: 36 from 28 nations
- Winning distance: 7.13 m

Medalists
gold medal	Tara Davis-Woodhall	United States
silver medal	Malaika Mihambo	Germany
bronze medal	Natalia Linares	Colombia

The women's long jump at the 2025 World Athletics Championships was held at the National Stadium in Tokyo on 13 and 14 September 2025.

== Summary ==
Defending champion Ivana Vuleta, now Španović, did not participate. An achilles tendon injury caused her to change her focus to triple jump as she reached the Masters age group. 2023 World Championship silver medalist Tara Davis-Woodhall returned as the Olympic Champion and undefeated world leader for the season. Yet she was ranked only second in the world rankings, behind Malaika Mihambo. In the qualifying round, Davis-Woodhall was one of five auto-qualifiers to the final. She was the only one to auto qualify for the final with her first qualification jump.

Davis-Woodhall achieved an impressive 7.08 m in the very first jump of the final. Natalia Linares would come out of the first round in second place with her 6.75 m. Both Mihambo and Pauline Hondema would make 6.60 m in the same round. In the second round, Mihambo took over second position with a 6.92 m, and Linares improved to 6.85 m. In the third round, Mihambo improved again to 6.95 m and Hilary Kpatcha jumped a 6.82 m. After the re-ordering, for the third straight round, Mihambo improved, this time to 6.99 m. Davis-Woodhall then jumped the 7.13 m winning jump. In the fifth round, Linares improved her hold on third to 6.92 m.

== Records ==
Before the competition records were as follows:

Record	Athlete & Nat.	Perf.	Location	Date
World Record	Galina Chistyakova (URS)	7.52 m	Leningrad, Soviet Union	11 June 1988
Championship Record	Jackie Joyner-Kersee (USA)	7.36 m	Rome, Italy	4 September 1987
World Leading	Tara Davis-Woodhall (USA)	7.12 m	Eugene, United States	31 July 2025
African Record	Ese Brume (NGR)	7.17 m	Chula Vista, United States	29 May 2021
Asian Record	Yao Weili (CHN)	7.01 m	Jinan, China	4 June 1993
European Record	Galina Chistyakova (URS)	7.52 m	Leningrad, Soviet Union	11 June 1988
North, Central American and Caribbean Record	Jackie Joyner-Kersee (USA)	7.49 m	New York City, United States	22 May 1994
North, Central American and Caribbean Record	Jackie Joyner-Kersee (USA)	7.49 m	Sestriere, Italy	31 July 1994
South American Record	Maurren Higa Maggi (BRA)	7.26 m	Bogotá, Colombia	25 June 1999
Oceanian Record	Brooke Buschkuehl (AUS)	7.13 m	Chula Vista, United States	9 July 2022

== Qualification standard ==
The standard to qualify automatically for entry was 6.86 m.

== Schedule ==
The event schedule, in local time (UTC+9), was as follows:

Date	Time	Round
13 September	18:30	Qualification
14 September	20:40	Final

== Results ==
=== Qualification ===
All athletes over 6.75 m ( Q ) or at least the 12 best performers ( q ) advanced to the final.

==== Group A ====
Place	Athlete	Nation	Round			Mark	Notes
Place	Athlete	Nation	#1	#2	#3	Mark	Notes
1	Tara Davis-Woodhall	United States	6.88 (+0.8 m/s)			6.88 m (+0.8 m/s)	Q
2	Hilary Kpatcha	France	6.56 (+1.0 m/s)	6.85 (+1.7 m/s)		6.85 m (+1.7 m/s)	Q
3	Marthe Koala	Burkina Faso	6.46 (±0.0 m/s)	6.76 (+0.3 m/s)		6.76 m (+0.3 m/s)	Q, SB
4	Natalia Linares	Colombia	6.58 (+0.4 m/s)	6.54 (+0.1 m/s)	6.66 (+1.6 m/s)	6.66 m (+1.6 m/s)	q
5	Quanesha Burks	United States	x	6.63 (−0.4 m/s)	6.50 (+1.8 m/s)	6.63 m (−0.4 m/s)	q
6	Chantel Malone	British Virgin Islands	6.62 (+0.2 m/s)	6.40 (+1.5 m/s)	x	6.62 m (+0.2 m/s)	q
7	Esraa Owis	Egypt	6.60 (−0.3 m/s)	4.77 (+1.2 m/s)	6.44 (+1.0 m/s)	6.60 m (−0.3 m/s)	q
8	Alysbeth Félix Boyer	Puerto Rico	6.53 (+1.0 m/s)	6.58 (+1.7 m/s)	6.49 (+0.8 m/s)	6.58 m (+1.7 m/s)	
9	Khaddi Sagnia	Sweden	x	6.48 (+1.8 m/s)	6.37 (−0.7 m/s)	6.48 m (+1.8 m/s)	
10	Sumire Hata	Japan	6.22 (−1.0 m/s)	x	6.45 (+1.2 m/s)	6.45 m (+1.2 m/s)	
11	Nikola Horowska	Poland	6.32 (+1.0 m/s)	6.39 (+0.4 m/s)	4.12 (±0.0 m/s)	6.39 m (+0.4 m/s)	
12	Annik Kälin	Switzerland	6.36 (±0.0 m/s)	x	x	6.36 m (±0.0 m/s)	
13	Ackelia Smith	Jamaica	6.34 (+0.4 m/s)	x	6.28 (+1.0 m/s)	6.34 m (+0.4 m/s)	
14	Delta Amidzovski	Australia	6.28 (−0.3 m/s)	x	6.19 (+1.4 m/s)	6.28 m (−0.3 m/s)	
15	Tyra Gittens-Spotsville	Trinidad and Tobago	x	6.05 (+1.7 m/s)	5.93 (+2.2 m/s)	6.05 m (+1.7 m/s)	
16	Prestina Oluchi Ochoogor	Nigeria	x	6.05 (−0.8 m/s)	x	6.05 m (−0.8 m/s)	
—	Lissandra Maysa Campos	Brazil				DNS	
—	Fátima Diame	Spain				DNS	

==== Group B ====
Place	Athlete	Nation	Round			Mark	Notes
Place	Athlete	Nation	#1	#2	#3	Mark	Notes
1	Agate de Sousa	Portugal	x	6.67 (−0.2 m/s)	6.81 (+2.2 m/s)	6.81 m (+2.2 m/s)	Q
2	Claire Bryant	United States	x	6.40 (+0.8 m/s)	6.72 (+0.4 m/s)	6.72 m (+0.4 m/s)	q
3	Pauline Hondema	Netherlands	6.35 (+0.8 m/s)	6.66 (+0.1 m/s)	6.46 (+0.8 m/s)	6.66 m (+0.1 m/s)	q
4	Malaika Mihambo	Germany	x	6.63 (+0.6 m/s)	x	6.63 m (+0.6 m/s)	q
5	Maja Åskag	Sweden	6.55 (−1.2 m/s)	6.49 (+1.2 m/s)	6.61 (+1.2 m/s)	6.61 m (+1.2 m/s)	q
6	Paola Fernández	Puerto Rico	6.47 (−0.2 m/s)	6.43 (−0.6 m/s)	6.58 (+0.9 m/s)	6.58 m (+0.9 m/s)	
7	Larissa Iapichino	Italy	6.52 (+0.2 m/s)	6.56 (+0.5 m/s)	6.32 (−0.2 m/s)	6.56 m (+0.5 m/s)	
8	Jazmin Sawyers	Great Britain & N.I.	6.54 (−0.1 m/s)	x	6.37 (+0.3 m/s)	6.54 m (−0.1 m/s)	
9	Anna Matuszewicz	Poland	x	6.48 (+0.9 m/s)	x	6.48 m (+0.9 m/s)	
10	Ese Brume	Nigeria	x	6.46 (+1.0 m/s)	6.36 (+0.4 m/s)	6.46 m (+1.0 m/s)	
11	Milica Gardašević	Serbia	6.41 (−0.6 m/s)	6.34 (+1.0 m/s)	6.38 (−0.6 m/s)	6.41 m (−0.6 m/s)	
12	Xiong Shiqi	China	x	6.38 (+1.0 m/s)	6.36 (+0.1 m/s)	6.38 m (+1.0 m/s)	
13	Alina Rotaru-Kottmann	Romania	6.37 (+0.4 m/s)	6.18 (+1.4 m/s)	6.26 (−0.5 m/s)	6.37 m (+0.4 m/s)	
14	Irati Mitxelena	Spain	6.27 (−0.9 m/s)	x	6.22 (−0.1 m/s)	6.27 m (−0.9 m/s)	
15	Plamena Mitkova	Bulgaria	6.26 (+0.3 m/s)	x	x	6.26 m (+0.3 m/s)	
16	Filippa Fotopoulou	Cyprus	6.25 (+0.6 m/s)	6.23 (+1.6 m/s)	6.07 (−0.3 m/s)	6.25 m (+0.6 m/s)	
17	Samantha Dale	Australia	6.18 (+0.1 m/s)	x	4.47 (−1.0 m/s)	6.18 m (+0.1 m/s)	
18	Danielle Nolte	South Africa	5.79 (−0.9 m/s)	x	5.70 (+1.3 m/s)	5.79 m (−0.9 m/s)	

=== Final ===
Place	Athlete	Nation	Round						Mark	Notes
Place	Athlete	Nation	#1	#2	#3	#4	#5	#6	Mark	Notes
1st place, gold medalist(s)	Tara Davis-Woodhall	United States	7.08 (−0.5 m/s)	6.84 (−0.3 m/s)	x	7.13 (−0.2 m/s)	x	6.93 (+0.1 m/s)	7.13 m (−0.2 m/s)	WL
2nd place, silver medalist(s)	Malaika Mihambo	Germany	6.60 (−0.2 m/s)	6.92 (−0.6 m/s)	6.95 (+0.1 m/s)	6.99 (+0.1 m/s)	x	x	6.99 m (+0.1 m/s)	
3rd place, bronze medalist(s)	Natalia Linares	Colombia	6.75 (−0.2 m/s)	6.85 (−0.5 m/s)	6.65 (−0.2 m/s)	x	6.92 (+0.5 m/s)	6.62 (+0.1 m/s)	6.92 m (+0.5 m/s)	=PB, =AU23R
4	Hilary Kpatcha	France	6.52 (−0.2 m/s)	x	6.82 (−0.1 m/s)	6.78 (−0.3 m/s)	6.50 (−0.1 m/s)	6.43 (−0.6 m/s)	6.82 m (−0.1 m/s)	
5	Claire Bryant	United States	6.57 (+0.1 m/s)	6.58 (−0.4 m/s)	6.51 (−0.5 m/s)	6.68 (±0.0 m/s)	6.62 (−0.3 m/s)	6.68 (−0.7 m/s)	6.68 m (±0.0 m/s)	
6	Agate de Sousa	Portugal	x	6.57 (+0.2 m/s)	6.67 (+0.5 m/s)	6.63 (−0.3 m/s)	x	5.19 (±0.0 m/s)	6.67 m (+0.5 m/s)	
7	Pauline Hondema	Netherlands	6.60 (+0.2 m/s)	6.57 (+0.4 m/s)	6.55 (−0.5 m/s)	6.36 (+0.4 m/s)	6.57 (−0.6 m/s)		6.60 m (+0.2 m/s)	
8	Quanesha Burks	United States	6.43 (+0.3 m/s)	6.47 (−0.4 m/s)	6.60 (−0.5 m/s)	6.34 (−0.4 m/s)	6.38 (−0.1 m/s)		6.60 m (−0.5 m/s)	
9	Maja Åskag	Sweden	6.49 (−0.4 m/s)	6.29 (−0.2 m/s)	6.27 (+0.1 m/s)	6.37 (+0.1 m/s)			6.49 m (−0.4 m/s)	
10	Marthe Koala	Burkina Faso	x	6.49 (−0.2 m/s)	x	6.03 (−0.3 m/s)			6.49 m (−0.2 m/s)	
11	Esraa Owis	Egypt	6.19 (−0.3 m/s)	6.36 (±0.0 m/s)	6.37 (+0.7 m/s)				6.37 m (+0.7 m/s)	
12	Chantel Malone	British Virgin Islands	6.17 (−0.1 m/s)	6.33 (+0.2 m/s)	6.23 (+0.5 m/s)				6.33 m (+0.2 m/s)	
