= Karmen Fouché =

South African athlete (born 2003)

Personal information
- Nationality: South African
- Born: 2 January 2003 (age 23)

Sport
- Sport: Athletics
- Event(s): Long jump, Triple jump, Heptathlon

Achievements and titles
- Personal best(s): Long jump: 6.56m (Sasolburg, 2023); Triple jump: 13.14m (Pretoria, 2024)

Karmen Fouché (born 2 January 2003) is a South African track and field athlete. In 2024, she became national champion in the triple jump and in 2025 she won the South African Championships title in the heptathlon.

== Early life ==
She attended Potchefstroom Gimnasium in North West.

== Career ==
She made a personal best long jump of 6.32 meters at the 2021 World Athletics U20 Championships in Nairobi. In April 2022, she won the South African U20 long jump title. She had a top-5 finish at the African Athletics Championships in Mauritius in June 2022. She finished sixth in the long jump at the 2022 World Athletics U20 Championships in Cali, Colombia.

In March 2023, she was named jumps athlete of the year by Modern Athlete. That month, Fouché took silver in the women's long jump at the senior South African Athletics Championships.

In March 2024, she finished runner up in the long jump at the South African U23 Track and Field Championships, at the Pilditch Stadium in Pretoria behind Danielle Nolte. In April 2024, she became the national champion in the triple jump at the South African Athletics Championships in Pietermaritzburg.

On 12 April 2025, she jumped 6.51 meters to finish second in the long jump behind World Indoor Champion Claire Bryant, on the World Athletics Continental Tour in Gaborone, Botswana. Later that month, she won the South African Championships heptathlon title in Potchefstroom.
