= List of Nigerian records in athletics =

The following are the national records in athletics in Nigeria maintained by the Athletic Federation of Nigeria (AFN).

== Outdoor ==
Key to tables: Awaiting ratification Record not kept by AFN Not ratified or later rescinded by AFN

=== Men ===
Event	Record	Athlete	Date	Meet	Place	Ref.
100 m	9.84 (+0.7 m/s)	Kayinsola Ajayi	29 May 2026	NCAA Division I East First Rounds	Lexington, United States	
100 m	9.84 (+0.1 m/s)	Kayinsola Ajayi	4 July 2026	Prefontaine Classic	Eugene, United States	
100 m	9.84 (−0.7 m/s)	Kayinsola Ajayi	18 July 2026	London Athletics Meet	London, United Kingdom	
150 m (bend)	15.33 (+0.9 m/s)	Enoch Adegoke	5 May 2024	Internationales Läufermeeting	Pliezhausen, Germany	
200 m	19.73 (+0.8 m/s)	Divine Oduduru	7 June 2019	NCAA Division I Championships	Austin, United States	
300 m	31.97	Innocent Egbunike	8 August 1986		London, United Kingdom	
400 m	43.38	Samuel Ogazi	12 June 2026	NCAA Division I Championships	Eugene, United States	
800 m	1:44.65	Edose Ibadin	30 July 2023	DC Championships	Washington, United States	
1500 m	3:42.85	Ado Maude	19 July 1991		Cesenatico, Italy	
3000 m	8:13.01	Ibrahim Kabir	13 June 1986		Lage, West Germany	
5000 m	14:15.50	Timon Gunem	19 June 1993		Lagos, Nigeria	
10,000 m	29:04.5	Itsifamus Choolon	7 June 1998		Lagos, Nigeria	
Half marathon	1:04:18	Emmanuel Gyang	7 December 2013		Nanning, China	
Marathon	2:16:06	Mohamed Abbas	11 November 1990		Lagos, Nigeria	
110 m hurdles	13.27 (+0.6 m/s)	Antwon Hicks	7 July 2016	Warri Relays & Olympic Trials	Sapele, Nigeria	
400 m hurdles	47.11	Ezekiel Nathaniel	19 September 2025	World Championships	Tokyo, Japan	
3000 m steeplechase	8:58.56	Zacharia Fwangfur	6 September 1990		Lagos, Nigeria	
3000 m steeplechase	8:55.78	Soudi Hamajam (Note: Cameroonian citizen)	14 June 2013		Warri, Nigeria	
High jump	2.27 m	Anthony Idiata	9 September 1998		Rhodes, Greece	
High jump	2.27 m	Anthony Idiata	18 September 1999	All-Africa Games	Johannesburg, South Africa	
Pole vault	4.60 m	Peter Moreno	24 May 2015		Bedford, United Kingdom	
Pole vault	4.60 m	Peter Moreno	11 July 2015		London, United Kingdom	
Pole vault	4.60 m (Note: record set during decathlon competition)	Peter Moreno	14 September 2015	African Games	Brazzaville, Republic of the Congo	
Long jump	8.27 m (−0.4 m/s)	Yusuf Alli	8 August 1989		Lagos, Nigeria	
Triple jump	17.26 m (+1.5 m/s)	Ajayi Agbebaku	8 July 1983		Edmonton, Canada	
Shot put	22.10 m	Chukwuebuka Enekwechi	5 July 2025	Prefontaine Classic	Eugene, United States	
Discus throw	67.80 m	Adewale Olukoju	11 May 1991	Modesto Relays	Modesto, United States	
Hammer throw	66.93 m	Christian Okoye	22 March 1986		Westwood, United States	
Hammer throw	67.45 m	Chukwuebuka Enekwechi	4 December 2022	21st National Sports Festival	Asaba, Nigeria	
Hammer throw	72.77 m (Note: before switching eligibility from USA to Nigeria)	Chukwuebuka Enekwechi	15 May 2015	Big Ten Championships	East Lansing, United States	
Javelin throw	84.68 m	Chinecherem Nnamdi	17 April 2026	Tom Jones Memorial	Gainesville, United States	
Decathlon	8024 pts	Jami Schlueter	6–7 June 2026	John Green/Texas Greatest Athlete CE Invitational	Dallas, United States	
Decathlon	100m (wind) / Long jump (wind) / Shot put / High jump / 400m / 110m H (wind) / Discus / Pole vault / Javelin / 1500m; 10.68 (+0.6 m/s) / 7.43 m (+0.9 m/s) / 15.80 m / 1.96 m / 48.65 / 14.18 (+1.0 m/s) / 43.18 m / 4.56 m / 46.69 m / 4:38.38					
10,000 m walk (track)	43:30.43	Kazeem Adeyemi	21 April 2012	AFN Golden League	Nsukka, Nigeria	
20 km walk (road)	1:31:27	Elegbede Bamidele	14 March 2015	AFN All Comers Meeting	Abuja, Nigeria	
20 km walk (road)	1:25:42 (Note: doubtful distance)	Kazeem Adeyemi	3 July 2008		Abuja, Nigeria	
50 km walk (road)	6:00:16	Charles Arosanyin	3 June 2002		Bradford, United Kingdom	
4 × 100 m relay	37.94	Nigeria; Osmond Ezinwa; Olapade Adeniken; Francis Obikwelu; Davidson Ezinwa	9 August 1997	World Championships	Athens, Greece	
4 × 100 m relay	37.91 X (Note: annulled because one of the team (Innocent Asonze) was ultimately suspended four two years from June 1999 for a doping violation)	Nigeria; Innocent Asonze; Francis Obikwelu; Davidson Ezinwa; Deji Aliu	29 August 1999	World Championships	Seville, Spain	
4 × 200 m relay	1:22.08	Nigeria; Jerry Jakpa; Enoch Adegoke; Ogho-Oghene Egwero; Emmanuel Arowolo	12 May 2019	IAAF World Relays	Yokohama, Japan	
4 × 400 m relay	2:58.68	Nigeria; Clement Chukwu; Jude Monye; Sunday Bada; Enefiok Udo-Obong	30 September 2000	Olympic Games	Sydney, Australia	
Sprint medley relay (2,2,4,8)	3:16.27	Nigeria; Orukpe Erayokan (200 m); Robert Simmons (200 m); Chidi Okezie (400 m); Sean Obinwa (800 m)	29 April 2017	Penn Relays	Philadelphia, United States	

=== Women ===
Event	Record	Athlete	Date	Meet	Place	Ref.
100 m	10.79 (+1.1 m/s)	Blessing Okagbare	27 July 2013	London Anniversary Games	London, United Kingdom	
150 m (straight)	15.85 (+2.0 m/s)	Favour Ofili	17 May 2025	Adidas Games	Atlanta, United States	
200 m	21.96 (+1.3 m/s)	Favour Ofili	15 April 2022	Tom Jones Invitational	Gainesville, United States	
300 m	36.25	Fatima Yusuf	23 September 1990		Siderno, Italy	
300 m	35.95+	Falilat Ogunkoya	26 August 1999	World Championships	Seville, Spain	
400 m	49.10	Falilat Ogunkoya	29 July 1996	Olympic Games	Atlanta, United States	
600 m	1:30.51	Patience Okon George	15 February 2014		Ijebu Ode, Nigeria	
800 m	2:01.54	Adisa Rhoda	30 May 2026	NCAA Division I East First Rounds	Lexington, United States	
1500 m	4:17.1 h	Victoria Moradeyo	29 July 1999		Lagos, Nigeria	
3000 m	9:41.28	Itsemhike Anwalimhobor	22 March 1989		Benin City, Nigeria	
5000 m	15:47.6 h	Aminat Olowora	23 June 2016		Portland, United States	
10,000 m	33:43.00	Aminat Olowora	4 April 2015	Arnie Robinson Invitational	San Diego, United States	
Marathon	2:40:37	Mary Akor	3 April 2004		St. Louis, United States	
100 m hurdles	12.12 (+0.9 m/s)	Tobi Amusan	24 July 2022	World Championships	Eugene, United States	
400 m hurdles	54.40	Muizat Ajoke Odumosu	6 August 2012	Olympic Games	London, United Kingdom	
3000 m steeplechase						
High jump	1.95 m	Doreen Amata	3 July 2008		Abuja, Nigeria	
High jump	1.95 m	Doreen Amata	16 July 2011	Internationales Hochsprung-Meeting Eberstadt	Eberstadt, Germany	
High jump	1.95 m	Doreen Amata	1 September 2011	World Championships	Daegu, South Korea	
High jump	1.97 m	Temitope Adeshina	8 June 2024	NCAA Division I Championships	Eugene, United States	
Pole vault	3.20 m	Victoria Itodo	17 May 2007		Lagos, Nigeria	
Pole vault	3.20 m	Maureen Williams	19 February 2009		Kaduna, Nigeria	
Long jump	7.17 m (+1.1 m/s)	Ese Brume	29 May 2021	Chula Vista Field Festival	Chula Vista, United States	
Triple jump	14.50 m (+2.0 m/s)	Ruth Usoro	10 April 2021	Masked Rider Open	Lubbock, United States	
Shot put	18.43 m (Note: Outdoor best; indoor mark ratified as absolute record.)	Vivian Chukwuemeka	19 April 2003	Mt. SAC Relays	Walnut, United States	
Shot put	18.86 m X	Vivian Chukwuemeka	1 July 2012	African Championships	Porto-Novo, Benin	
Discus throw	64.96 m	Chioma Onyekwere	14 April 2023	Oklahoma Throws Series Meet 2	Ramona, United States	
Hammer throw	75.49 m	Annette Echikunwoke	22 May 2021	USATF Throws Festival	Tucson, United States	
Javelin throw	58.15 m	Kelechi Nwanaga	18 July 2017	Warri Relays	Ozoro, Nigeria	
Heptathlon	6153 pts	Uhunoma Osazuwa	24–25 June 2016	African Championships	Durban, South Africa	
Heptathlon	100m H (wind) / High jump / Shot put / 200m (wind) / Long jump (wind) / Javelin / 800m; 13.32 (+1.4 m/s) / 1.83 m / 12.87 m / 24.19 (NWI) / 6.24 m (±0.0 m/s) / 36.30 m / 2:17.50					
20,000 m walk (track)	1:44:52.21	Fedekemi Olude	15 February 2018	Commonwealth Games Trials	Abuja, Nigeria	
20 km walk (road)	1:42:56	Queen Henshaw	14 March 2015	AFN All Comers Meeting	Abuja, Nigeria	
50 km walk (road)						
4 × 100 m relay	42.10	Nigeria; Tobi Amusan; Favour Ofili; Rosemary Chukwuma; Nzubechi Grace Nwokocha	7 August 2022	Commonwealth Games	Birmingham, United Kingdom	
4 × 200 m relay	1:30.52	Nigeria; Blessing Okagbare; Regina George; Dominique Duncan; Christy Udoh	2 May 2015	IAAF World Relays	Nassau, Bahamas	
4 × 400 m relay	3:21.04	Nigeria; Olabisi Afolabi; Fatima Yusuf; Charity Opara; Falilat Ogunkoya	3 August 1996	Olympic Games	Atlanta, United States	

=== Mixed ===
Event	Record	Athlete	Date	Meet	Place	Ref.
4 × 100 m relay	41.91	Nigeria; Tejiri Godwin; Chigozie Rosemary Nwankwo; Perfect Faye; Oluebube Ezechukwu	6 August 2026	World U20 Championships	Eugene, United States	
4 × 400 m relay	3:11.99	Nigeria; Samuel Ogazi; Ella Onojuvwevwo; Ifeanyi Emmanuel Ojeli; Patience Okon George	2 August 2024	Olympic Games	Saint-Denis, France	

== Indoor ==
=== Men ===
Event	Record	Athlete	Date	Meet	Place	Ref.
50 m	5.61+	Deji Aliu	21 February 1999	Meeting Pas de Calais	Liévin, France	
55 m	5.25	Udodi Onwuzurike	17 January 2021		Virginia Beach, United States	
60 m	6.45	Kayinsola Ajayi	26 February 2026	SEC Championships	College Station, United Station	
60 m	6.45	Kayinsola Ajayi	14 March 2026	NCAA Division I Championships	Fayetteville, United States	
100 m	10.64	Nnamdi Anusim	12 February 2005		Tampere, Finland	
200 m	20.08	Divine Oduduru	23 February 2019	Big 12 Conference Championships	Lubbock, United States	
300 m	33.09	Kunle Fasasi	7 January 2017	Clemson Orange and Purple Classic	Clemson, United States	
400 m	44.57	Samuel Ogazi	14 March 2026	NCAA Division I Championships	Fayetteville, United States	
600 m	1:16.35	Edose Ibadin	25 February 2022	Fastrack Last Chance	New York City, United States	
800 m	1:46.63	Edose Ibadin	29 June 2021	District Track 800	Chicago, United States	
1000 m	2:21.00	Edose Ibadin	8 February 2019	Fastrack National Invitational	New York City, United States	
1500 m						
3000 m						
50 m hurdles	6.55+	Selim Nurudeen	10 February 2009	Meeting Pas de Calais	Liévin, France	
60 m hurdles	7.64	Selim Nurudeen	13 February 2009		Paris, France	
400 m hurdles	52.20	Akobundu Ikwuakor	10 February 2009	Meeting Pas de Calais	Liévin, France	
High jump	2.32 m (Note: outdoor mark ratified as absolute record)	Anthony Idiata	15 February 2000		Patras, Greece	
Pole vault	4.33 m	Peter Moreno	25 September 2011		Carshalton, United Kingdom	
Long jump	8.26 m	Charlton Ehizuelen	7 March 1975		Bloomington, United States	
Triple jump	17.00 m	Ajayi Agbebaku	30 January 1982		Dallas, United States	
Shot put	21.33 m	Josh Awotunde	25 February 2018	SEC Championships	College Station, United States	
Weight throw	19.14 m	Stephen Mozia	25 January 2014	Cornell Upstate Challenge	Ithaca, United States	
Weight throw	24.39 m (Note: before switching eligibility from USA to Nigeria)	Chukwuebuka Enekwechi	13 February 2015	Fred Wilt Invitational	West Lafayette, United States	
Heptathlon	4631 pts	Lee Okoroafor	22–23 March 2003		Cardiff, United Kingdom	
Heptathlon	60m / Long jump / Shot put / High jump / 60m H / Pole vault / 1000m; 7.25 / 6.44 m / 10.35 m / 1.87 m / 8.69 / 3.15 m / 2:51.72					
Heptathlon	4859 pts	Chukwuma Maduka (Note: US citizenship by World Athletics Profile)	26–27 January 2018	Liberty Kickoff	Lynchburg, United States	
Heptathlon	60m / Long jump / Shot put / High jump / 60m H / Pole vault / 1000m; 7.00 / 6.76 m / 11.44 m / 1.96 m / 8.74 / 3.80 m / 3:16.17					
5000 m walk						
4 × 400 m relay	3:07.95	Nigeria; Tobi Ogunmola; Noah Akwu; Salihu Isah; Cristian Morton	8 March 2014	World Championships	Sopot, Poland	

=== Women ===
Event	Record	Athlete	Date	Meet	Place	Ref.
50 m	6.04+	Chioma Ajunwa	22 February 1998	Meeting Pas de Calais	Liévin, France	
55 m	6.58	Beatrice Utondu-Okoye	11 February 1990		Monroe, United States	
60 m	7.02	Christy Opara-Thompson	12 February 1997	Indoor Flanders Meeting	Ghent, Belgium	
60 m	7.02	Chioma Ajunwa	22 February 1998	Meeting Pas de Calais	Liévin, France	
200 m	22.11 A	Favour Ofili	10 March 2023	NCAA Division I Championships	Albuquerque, United States	
300 m	35.99	Favour Ofili	4 February 2024	New Balance Indoor Grand Prix	Boston, United States	
400 m	50.73	Charity Opara	1 February 1998	Sparkassen Cup	Stuttgart, Germany	
400 m	50.28	Ella Onojuvwevwo	13 March 2026	NCAA Division I Championships	Fayetteville, United States	
600 m	1:25.76	Regina George	10 January 2014	Arkansas Invitational	Fayetteville, United States	
800 m	2:07.28	Regina George	16 January 2015		Houston, United States	
800 m	2:07.23 OT	Fatimoh Muhammed	11 February 2006		Ames, United States	
800 m	2:04.47 OT	Abike Egbeniyi	13 January 2017	Vanderbilt Invitational	Nashville, United States	
800 m	2:03.77 OT	Abike Egbeniyi	19 January 2019	Vanderbilt Invitational	Nashville, United States	
1500 m						
3000 m						
5000 m						
50 m hurdles	6.76+	Glory Alozie	25 February 2001	Meeting Pas de Calais	Liévin, France	
55 m hurdles	7.60	Ime Akpan	13 March 1992	NCAA Division I Championships	Indianapolis, United States	
60 m hurdles	7.82	Glory Alozie	16 February 1999		Madrid, Spain	
60 m hurdles	7.77	Tobi Amusan	27 January 2024	Astana Indoor Meeting	Astana, Kazakhstan	
60 m hurdles	7.75	Tobi Amusan	4 February 2024	New Balance Indoor Grand Prix	Boston, United States	
High jump	1.93 m	Doreen Amata	4 February 2016	Banskobystricka latka High Jump Meeting	Banská Bystrica, Slovakia	
High jump	1.93 m	Doreen Amata	13 February 2016		Hustopeče, Czech Republic	
High jump	1.96 m	Temitope Adeshina	19 January 2024	Corky Classic	Lubbock, United States	
Pole vault						
Long jump	6.97 m	Chioma Ajunwa	5 February 1997		Erfurt, Germany	
Triple jump	14.36 m	Ruth Usoro	27 February 2021	Big 12 Championships	Lubbock, United States	
Triple jump	14.76 m	Ruth Usoro	15 January 2022	Corky Classic	Lubbock, United States	
Shot put	18.50 m	Jessica Oji	1 March 2026	Ivy League Championships	New York City, United States	
Weight throw	25.32 m	Oyesade Olatoye	10 February 2023	Music City Challenge	Nashville, United States	
Pentathlon	4061 pts	Uhunoma Osazuwa	13 March 2010		Fayetteville, United States	
Pentathlon	60m H / High jump / Shot put / Long jump / 800m; 8.63 / 1.71 m / 11.18 m / 6.08 m / 2:29.96					
Pentathlon	4116 pts	Uhunoma Osazuwa	11 February 2011		Allendale, United States	
Pentathlon	60m H / High jump / Shot put / Long jump / 800m; 9.00 / 1.66 m / 11.65 m / 5.70 m / 2:20.07					
Pentathlon	4206 pts OT	Uhunoma Osazuwa	10 February 2012		Geneva, United States	
Pentathlon	60m H / High jump / Shot put / Long jump / 800m; 8.35 / 1.77 m / 10.86 m / 5.99 m / 2:23.00					
Pentathlon	4111 pts	Patience Itanyi	7 December 1996		Morgantown, United States	
Pentathlon	60m H / High jump / Shot put / Long jump / 800m; 7.74 (55m hurdles) / 1.73 m / 10.39 m / 6.20 m / 2:27.64					
3000 m walk						
4 × 400 m relay	3:29.67	Nigeria; Omolara Omotosho; Patience Okon George; Bukola Abogunloko; Folashade Abugan	8 March 2014	World Championships	Sopot, Poland	
