= 2022 African Championships in Athletics – Women's long jump =

The women's long jump event at the 2022 African Championships in Athletics was held on 10 June in Port Louis, Mauritius.

== Results ==
Rank	Athlete	Nationality	#1	#2	#3	#4	#5	#6	Result	Notes
1st place, gold medalist(s)	Marthe Koala	Burkina Faso	5.90	6.25	6.13	x	6.42	x	6.42	
2nd place, silver medalist(s)	Yousra Lajdoud	Morocco	6.24	6.34	6.37	6.21	6.03	6.18	6.37	
3rd place, bronze medalist(s)	Esraa Samir	Egypt	6.16	6.29	6.29	x	x	x	6.29	
4	Eljone Kruger	South Africa	5.76	5.96	x	6.14	x	x	6.14	
5	Karmen Fouché	South Africa	6.10	5.99	6.10	5.96	5.99	6.10	6.10	
6	Danielle Nolte	South Africa	6.09	5.75	5.82	5.61	x	5.56	6.09	
7	Nemata Nikiema	Burkina Faso	5.73w	5.97	x	4.25	–	–	5.97	
8	Véronique Kossenda Rey	Cameroon	5.64	5.63	5.86w	5.74	5.70	x	5.86w	
9	Priscilla Tabunda	Kenya	5.81	x	x				5.81	
9	Ruth Agadama	Nigeria	5.81	x	x				5.81	
11	Fayza Issaka-Abdoukerim	Togo	4.83	5.31	5.70				5.70	
12	Pauline Raissa Ngouopou	Cameroon	5.52	5.32	5.64				5.64	
13	Lola Robert	Réunion	5.33	5.62	5.57				5.62	
14	Françoise Kumi	Democratic Republic of the Congo	4.29	4.48	4.31				4.48	
