= Yasmina Omrani =

French-Algerian heptathlete

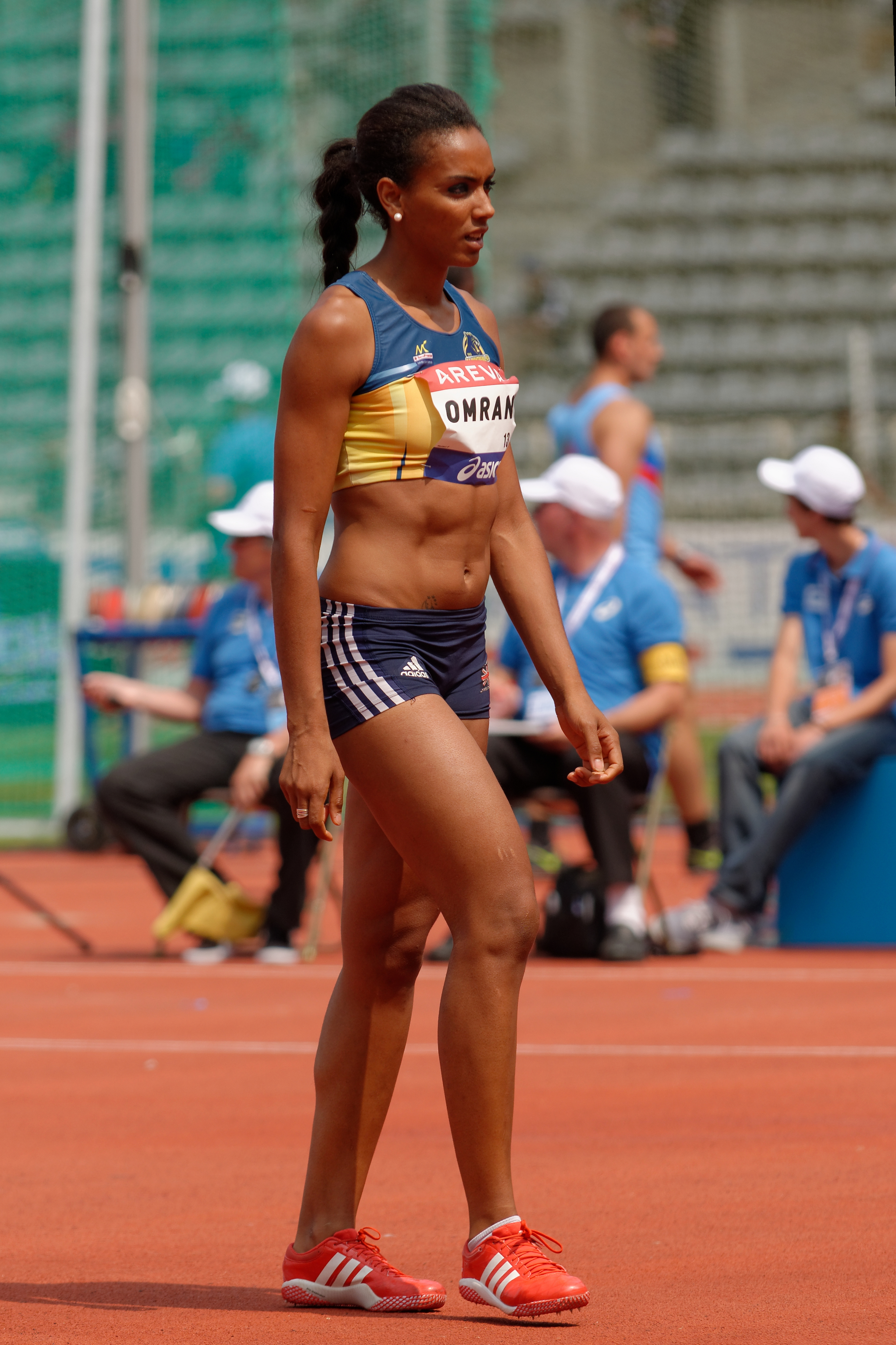
- Omrani at French Athletics Championships in 2013

Personal information
- Born: 1 January 1988 (age 38) Forbach, France
Medal record
Women's athletics
Representing Algeria
Mediterranean Games
Gold medal – first place	2013 Mersin	Heptathlon
African Championships
Gold medal – first place	2012 Porto-Novo	Heptathlon

Yasmina Omrani (Arabic: ياسمينة عمراني; born 1 January 1988) is an Algerian retired track and field athlete who specialised in the heptathlon. Her personal best for the event is 5979 points (set in 2010) and she also has an indoor pentathlon best of 4386 points.

She began competing for Algeria in 2012 and won the gold medal in the heptathlon at the 2012 African Championships in Athletics. In her second year of competition she won gold medals at the Arab Athletics Championships and the Mediterranean Games.

== Career ==
Born in Forbach, France into a sporting family of Algerian descent, her younger brothers Abdelhakim and Billel are professional footballers. At the beginning of her athletics career she competed for her native France.

Omrani competed in combined track and field events from a young age and placed 14th at the 2005 World Youth Championships in Athletics (her first major competition). She competed in her first major meetings in 2006 (Meeting International d'Arles and Multistars) and won the French junior title with a best of 5333 points. She bettered this by 43 points to place eleventh at the 2006 World Junior Championships in Athletics. At the 2007 European Athletics Junior Championships she managed only 17th place.

In 2008 she improved to 5620 points to take seventh in Arles, came 17th at the European Cup Combined Events meet, and set a personal best of 5669 points to win the French under-23 title. Her 2009 followed a similar pattern with a best of 5772 points in Arles, eleventh at the European Cup, then a best of 5866 points for eighth at the 2009 European Athletics U23 Championships. Omrani improved to 5979 points at the 2010 European Cup, taking fourth overall, and came second at the French Athletics Championships that year. She failed to finish the heptathlon at either of those competitions the following year. In her final outing as a French athlete in May 2012 she recorded 5875 points for fourth at the Multistars meet.

From 22 May 2012 Omrani transferred her eligibility to Algeria, the birthplace of her parents. She competed as a guest at the French Championships and won the national title in a season's best of 5935 points. On her debut for Algeria she won the gold medal at the 2012 African Championships in Athletics – the defending champion Margaret Simpson failed to finish and Omrani's score of 5924 won by a margin of over 400 points.

Her gold medal streak continued with wins at the 2013 Arab Athletics Championships and the Mediterranean Games. She finished 19th at the 2013 World Championships and at the 2014 African Championships she dropped out after four events.
