= 2026 African Championships in Athletics – Women's heptathlon =

Women's heptathlon at the 2026 African Championships in Athletics
- Venue: Legon Sports Stadium
- Location: Accra, Ghana
- Dates: 14–15 May
- Competitors: 5 from 5 nations
- Winning time: 5273

Medalists
| gold medal | Odile Ahouanwanou | Benin |
| silver medal | Enya Pooler | South Africa |
| bronze medal | Adèle Mafogang | Cameroon |

The women's heptathlon event at the 2026 African Championships in Athletics was held on 14 and 15 May in Accra, Ghana.

== Results ==
The highest mark recorded in each event is highlighted in yellow

| Rank | Athlete | Nationality | 100m H | HJ | SP | 200m | LJ | JT | 800m | Points | Notes |
|---|---|---|---|---|---|---|---|---|---|---|---|
| 1st place, gold medalist(s) | Odile Ahouanwanou | Benin | 14.64 | 1.66 | 13.14 | 26.73 | 5.73w | 42.61 | 2:35.85 | 5273 | |
| 2nd place, silver medalist(s) | Enya Pooler | South Africa | 15.47 | 1.63 | 11.70 | 25.39 | 5.70w | 34.30 | 2:14.88 | 5255 | |
| 3rd place, bronze medalist(s) | Adèle Mafogang | Cameroon | 15.91 | 1.72 | 13.32 | 26.71 | 5.48w | 34.61 | 2:15.94 | 5227 | |
| 4 | Nada Cheroudi | Tunisia | 15.96 | 1.60 | 15.08 | 26.89 | 5.62w | 42.88 | 2:29.26 | 5202 | |
| 5 | Omnia Khaled | Egypt | 14.15 | 1.69 | 11.27 | 26.12 | 5.49w | 28.30 | 2:32.40 | 5003 | |
