= Athletics at the 2011 All-Africa Games – Women's heptathlon =

The women's heptathlon event at the 2011 All-Africa Games was held on 13–14 September.

== Results ==
The highest mark recorded in each event is highlighted in yellow

Rank	Athlete	Nationality	100m H	HJ	SP	200m	LJ	JT	800m	Points	Notes
1st place, gold medalist(s)	Margaret Simpson	Ghana	13.71	1.80	12.63	25.29	5.92	55.93	2:21.02	6172	
2nd place, silver medalist(s)	Gabriella Kouassi	Ivory Coast	13.76	1.62	14.10	26.70	5.70	49.55	2:22.33	5714	
3rd place, bronze medalist(s)	Selloane Tsoaeli	Lesotho	14.62	1.77	11.99	26.30	6.02	36.47	2:16.75	5590	
4	Patience Okoro	Nigeria	14.39	1.71	13.14	25.92	5.47	41.12	2:40.43	5280	
5	Marthe Koala	Burkina Faso	14.05	1.59	10.66	24.37	6.07	27.55	2:36.26	5133	
6	Sandrine Thiebaud	Togo	14.93	1.53	10.52	25.48	5.29	25.16	2:16.41	4813	
7	Anny Curty Oyono	Cameroon	14.93	1.53	11.21	26.32	5.42	28.77	2:40.23	4586	
8	Bibiana Mangu	Equatorial Guinea	16.19	1.41	11.13	28.80	4.37	31.63	2:34.80	3929	
	Salome Mugabe	Mozambique	15.69	1.35	13.09	27.33	5.09	35.14	DNS	DNF	
	Uhanoma Osazuwa	Nigeria	14.45	DNS	–	–	–	–	DNS	DNF	
	Nana Blakime	Togo	DNF	DNS	–	–	–	–	DNS	DNF	
