= Athletics at the 2023 African Games – Women's long jump =

The women's long jump event at the 2023 African Games was held on 21 March 2024 in Accra, Ghana.

== Medalists ==
Gold	Silver	Bronze
Ese Brume; Nigeria	Marthe Koala; Burkina Faso	Prestina Ochonogor; Nigeria

== Results ==
Held on 21 March

Rank	Name	Nationality	#1	#2	#3	#4	#5	#6	Result	Notes
1st place, gold medalist(s)	Ese Brume	Nigeria	6.92w	6.84w	–	6.68w	–	–	6.92w	
2nd place, silver medalist(s)	Marthe Koala	Burkina Faso	6.64w	6.81w	6.53w	6.58	6.52	6.42	6.81w	
3rd place, bronze medalist(s)	Prestina Ochonogor	Nigeria	6.24	6.66w	6.35w	6.39w	6.67w	6.43	6.67w	
4	Ruth Usoro	Nigeria	6.61	6.54	x	6.62w	6.08w	x	6.62w	
5	Esraa Owis	Egypt	6.44w	6.18w	x	6.52w	6.40w	6.57w	6.57w	
6	Yousra Lajdoud	Morocco	x	6.53w	6.40w	6.00	6.25	6.49w	6.53w	
7	Fayza Issaka Abdou Kerim	Togo	x	6.00w	5.93w	x	x	6.03w	6.03w	
8	Florent Razanamandroso	Madagascar	x	5.89w	5.92	5.66w	5.73w	x	5.92	
9	Pwoch Omod Olok	Ethiopia	x	5.84w	5.66w				5.84w	
10	Sylvie Sawadogo	Burkina Faso	5.38w	5.80	5.41w				5.80	
11	Winfred Atimango	Uganda	5.09w	5.01w	5.53w				5.53w	
12	Ruth Muaca Henriques	Angola	4.81w	4.77w	5.01w				5.01w	
	Véronique Kossenda Rey	Cameroon							DNS	
