= 2012 African Championships in Athletics – Women's heptathlon =

The women's heptathlon at the 2012 African Championships in Athletics was held at the Stade Charles de Gaulle on 29 and 30 June.

== Medalists ==
Gold	Yasmina Omrani; Algeria
Silver	Gabriella Kouassi; Ivory Coast
Bronze	Bianca Erwee; South Africa

== Records ==
Standing records prior to the 2012 African Championships in Athletics
World record	Jackie Joyner-Kersee (USA)	7291	Seoul, South Korea	24 September 1988
African record	Margaret Simpson (GHA)	6423	Götzis, Austria	29 May 2005
Championship record	Margaret Simpson (GHA)	6031	Nairobi, Kenya	31 July 201

== Schedule ==
Date	Time	Round
29 June 2012	13:00	110 metres hurdles
29 June 2012	13:45	High jump
29 June 2012	15:50	Shot put
29 June 2012	17:30	200 metres
30 June 2012	13:00	Long jump
30 June 2012	15:20	Javelin throw
30 June 2012	16:10	800 metres
30 June 2012		Final standings

== Results ==
=== 100 metres hurdles ===
Rank	Heat	Lane	Name	Nationality	Time	Notes	Points
1	2	8	Uhunoma Osazuwa	Nigeria	13.59		1037
2	2	5	Yasmina Omrani	Algeria	13.75		1014
3	1	3	Margaret Simpson	Ghana	13.88		995
4	2	7	Gabriella Kouassi	Ivory Coast	13.92		990
5	2	4	Fiona Asigbee	Ghana	14.07		968
6	1	8	Sandrine Thiébaud-Kangni	Togo	14.51		907
7	1	2	Nada Chroudi	Tunisia	14.76		874
8	2	6	Selloane Tsoaeli	Lesotho	14.81		867
9	1	7	Nana Blakime	Togo	14.88		858
9	2	3	Bianca Erwee	South Africa	14.88		858
11	1	5	Odile Ahouanwanou	Benin	14.89	NR	856
12	1	4	Annie Curty Oyono	Cameroon	15.08		831
13	1	6	Oluwakemi Francis	Nigeria	15.46		782
14	2	2	Salamatu Musah	Ghana	19.92		309

=== High jump ===
Rank	Name	Nationality	1.40	1.43	1.46	1.49	1.52	1.55	1.58	1.61	1.64	1.67	1.70	1.73	1.76	1.79	1.82	1.85	1.88	Result	Notes	Points
1	Uhunoma Osazuwa	Nigeria	–	–	–	–	–	–	–	–	–	o	–	xo	o	xo	xxo	xo	xxx	1.85		1041
2	Bianca Erwee	South Africa	–	–	–	–	–	–	–	o	o	o	o	o	xo	xo	xxo	xxx		1.82		1003
3	Selloane Tsoaeli	Lesotho	–	–	–	–	–	–	–	o	o	o	xo	o	xo	xo	xxx			1.79		966
4	Margaret Simpson	Ghana	–	–	–	–	–	–	–	–	o	o	o	o	o	xxx				1.76		928
5	Yasmina Omrani	Algeria	–	–	–	–	–	–	–	–	o	o	o	o	xxo	xxx				1.76		928
6	Fiona Asigbee	Ghana	–	–	–	–	–	o	o	o	o	o	xo	xxo	xxo	xxx				1.76		928
7	Gabriella Kouassi	Ivory Coast	–	–	–	–	–	o	–	xxo	o	xxx								1.64		783
8	Odile Ahouanwanou	Benin	–	–	–	–	–	o	o	o	xxo	xxx								1.64		783
9	Nada Chroudi	Tunisia	–	–	o	o	o	o	o	xo	xxx									1.61		747
10	Nana Blakime	Togo	–	o	o	o	o	xxo	xxx											1.55		678
11	Oluwakemi Francis	Nigeria	–	–	o	xo	o	xxx												1.52		644
12	Sandrine Thiébaud-Kangni	Togo	–	–	–	–	xo	xxx												1.52		644
13	Salamatu Musah	Ghana	o	o	xo	xo	xxo	xxx												1.52		644
	Annie Curty Oyono	Cameroon																		DNS		

=== Shot put ===
Rank	Name	Nationality	#1	#2	#3	Result	Notes	Points
1	Yasmina Omrani	Algeria	10.58	13.49	11.74	13.49		760
2	Gabriella Kouassi	Ivory Coast	13.09	13.15	12.92	13.15		737
3	Uhunoma Osazuwa	Nigeria	12.47	x	11.83	12.47		692
4	Odile Ahouanwanou	Benin	12.28	11.84	12.42	12.42		689
5	Fiona Asigbee	Ghana	12.28	x	11.69	12.28		680
6	Nada Chroudi	Tunisia	12.10	12.24	12.24	12.24		677
7	Selloane Tsoaeli	Lesotho	10.53	11.42	10.06	11.42		623
8	Nana Blakime	Togo	10.53	10.17	10.75	10.75		579
9	Oluwakemi Francis	Nigeria	10.43	x	10.00	10.43		558
10	Bianca Erwee	South Africa	10.41	10.13	10.05	10.41		556
11	Sandrine Thiébaud-Kangni	Togo	9.32	9.61	x	9.61		504
12	Salamatu Musah	Ghana	9.35	x	6.53	9.35		487
	Margaret Simpson	Ghana				DNS		

=== 200 metres ===
Rank	Heat	Lane	Name	Nationality	Time	Notes	Points
1	2	3	Uhunoma Osazuwa	Nigeria	23.82		998
2	1	2	Yasmina Omrani	Algeria	24.49		934
3	1	7	Sandrine Thiébaud-Kangni	Togo	24.52		931
4	2	7	Oluwakemi Francis	Nigeria	24.93		893
5	1	5	Nana Blakime	Togo	25.55		837
6	1	6	Fiona Asigbee	Ghana	25.80		815
7	2	8	Bianca Erwee	South Africa	26.03		795
8	1	4	Nada Chroudi	Tunisia	26.06		792
9	2	4	Gabriella Kouassi	Ivory Coast	26.23		777
10	2	5	Odile Ahouanwanou	Benin	26.24		776
11	2	2	Salamatu Musah	Ghana	26.50		754
12	1	8	Selloane Tsoaeli	Lesotho	26.60		745

=== Long jump ===
Rank	Name	Nationality	#1	#2	#3	Result	Notes	Points
1	Bianca Erwee	South Africa	5.75	5.64	5.57	5.75		774
2	Fiona Asigbee	Ghana	5.62	5.61	5.73	5.73		768
3	Uhunoma Osazuwa	Nigeria	5.60	5.72	x	5.72		765
4	Gabriella Kouassi	Ivory Coast	5.63	5.68	5.61	5.68		753
5	Yasmina Omrani	Algeria	5.58	5.44	5.60	5.60		729
6	Selloane Tsoaeli	Lesotho	5.57	5.28	5.25	5.57		720
7	Nana Blakime	Togo	5.36	5.33	4.93	5.36		660
8	Oluwakemi Francis	Nigeria	5.11	5.12	5.31	5.31		645
9	Salamatu Musah	Ghana	5.19	5.04	4.73	5.19		612
10	Odile Ahouanwanou	Benin	5.14	4.81	4.80	5.14		598
11	Nada Chroudi	Tunisia	4.96	5.10	4.78	5.10		587
	Sandrine Thiébaud-Kangni	Togo	x			DNS		

=== Javelin throw ===
Rank	Name	Nationality	#1	#2	#3	Result	Notes	Points
1	Gabriella Kouassi	Ivory Coast	x	40.82	x	40.82		683
2	Nada Chroudi	Tunisia	39.72	x	x	39.72		662
3	Yasmina Omrani	Algeria	36.74	38.61	35.28	38.61		641
4	Odile Ahouanwanou	Benin	33.36	33.15	37.62	37.62		622
5	Bianca Erwee	South Africa	35.76	35.93	35.40	35.93		589
6	Oluwakemi Francis	Nigeria	33.26	x	32.92	33.26		538
7	Salamatu Musah	Ghana	25.56	30.94	25.60	30.94		494
8	Nana Blakime	Togo	29.50	x	x	29.50		467
	Uhunoma Osazuwa	Nigeria	x	x	x	NM		0
	Fiona Asigbee	Ghana	x	x	x	NM		0
	Selloane Tsoaeli	Lesotho				DNS		

=== 800 metres ===
Rank	Name	Nationality	Result	Notes	Points
1	Yasmina Omrani	Algeria	2:13.21		918
2	Nada Chroudi	Tunisia	2:21.21		807
3	Oluwakemi Francis	Nigeria	2:22.12		795
4	Bianca Erwee	South Africa	2:24.55		763
5	Gabriella Kouassi	Ivory Coast	2:24.89		758
6	Nana Blakime	Togo	2:31.13		679
7	Odile Ahouanwanou	Benin	2:32.75		659
8	Salamatu Musah	Ghana	2:33.50		650
9	Uhunoma Osazuwa	Nigeria	2:38.29		593
	Fiona Asigbee	Ghana	DNS		

=== Final standings ===
Rank	Name	Nationality	Points	Notes
1st place, gold medalist(s)	Yasmina Omrani	Algeria	5924	
2nd place, silver medalist(s)	Gabriella Kouassi	Ivory Coast	5481	
3rd place, bronze medalist(s)	Bianca Erwee	South Africa	5338	
4	Nada Chroudi	Tunisia	5146	
5	Uhunoma Osazuwa	Nigeria	5126	
6	Odile Ahouanwanou	Benin	4983	
7	Oluwakemi Francis	Nigeria	4855	
8	Nana Blakime	Togo	4758	
9	Salamatu Musah	Ghana	3950	
	Annie Curty Oyono	Cameroon	DNF	
	Fiona Asigbee	Ghana	DNF	
	Selloane Tsoaeli	Lesotho	DNF	
	Sandrine Thiébaud-Kangni	Togo	DNF	
	Margaret Simpson	Ghana	DNF	
