= Bianca Erwee =

South African heptathlete (born 1990)

Medal record

Women's athletics

Representing South Africa

African Championships
Bronze medal – third place	2012 Porto-Novo	Heptathlon
Bronze medal – third place	2014 Marrakesh	Heptathlon

Bianca Erwee (born 4 March 1990) is a retired South African heptathlete who saw success on the continental level.

She won the bronze medals at the 2012 and 2014 African Championships and finished tenth at the 2013 Summer Universiade.

Her personal best score was 5715 points, achieved in March 2013 in Germiston.
