= Gabriela Kouassi =

French-Ivorian heptathlete

Medal record

Women's athletics

Representing Ivory Coast

African Championships
Silver medal – second place	2012 Porto-Novo	Heptathlon

Gabriela Kouassi (born 18 November 1979) is a French-Ivorian retired heptathlete.

Representing France, she finished 18th at the 1998 World Junior Championships and 17th at the 2001 European U23 Championships. She later changed her allegiance to Ivory Coast.

She won the gold medal at the 2009 Jeux de la Francophonie, the silver medal at the 2011 All-Africa Games and another silver medal at the 2012 African Championships.

Her personal best score was 5766 points, achieved in April 2012 in Bambous, Mauritius. This is the Ivorian record. She also holds Ivorian records for pentathlon (indoors), shot put indoors and javelin throw.

In 1997 while representing France, Kouassi scored 7,233 points at a women's decathlon in Arles. As of 2025, her score makes her the #18 performer of all time in the event.
