= Athletics at the 2015 African Games – Women's heptathlon =

The women's heptathlon event at the 2015 African Games was held on 15–16 September.

== Medalists ==
Gold	Silver	Bronze
Uhunoma Osazuwa; Nigeria	Odile Ahouanwanou; Benin	Marthe Koala; Burkina Faso

== Results ==
=== 100 metres hurdles ===
Wind:
Heat 1: +0.4 m/s, Heat 2: –0.2 m/s

Rank	Heat	Name	Nationality	Time	Points	Notes
1	2	Marthe Koala	Burkina Faso	13.43	1060	
2	2	Francis Oluwakemi	Nigeria	13.69	1023	
3	2	Elizabeth Dadzie	Ghana	13.72	1018	
4	2	Uhunoma Osazuwa	Nigeria	13.86	998	
5	2	Odile Ahouanwanou	Benin	14.00	978	
6	1	Hoda Atef	Egypt	14.14	959	
6	1	Priscillah Tabunda	Kenya	14.16	956	
7	2	Annie Curty Oyono	Cameroon	14.90	855	
8	1	Hope Idhe	Nigeria	14.96	847	
9	1	June Roelofse	South Africa	15.11	827	
10	1	Ndeye Binta Thiombane	Senegal	15.23	811	
11	2	Nienka du Toit	South Africa	15.24	810	
12	1	Corlia Kruger	Namibia	15.26	808	

=== High jump ===
Rank	Athlete	Nationality	1.39	1.45	1.48	1.51	1.54	1.57	1.60	1.63	1.66	1.69	1.72	1.75	1.78	1.81	1.84	Result	Points	Notes	Total
1	Uhunoma Osazuwa	Nigeria	–	–	–	–	–	–	–	–	o	–	o	xo	o	xo	xxx	1.81	991		1989
2	June Roelofse	South Africa	–	–	–	–	–	o	–	o	o	o	o	xxx				1.72	879		1706
3	Hoda Atef	Egypt	–	–	–	–	–	–	o	–	xo	–	o	xxx				1.72	879		1838
4	Odile Ahouanwanou	Benin	–	–	–	–	–	o	–	o	xo	xo	o	xxx				1.72	879	NR	1857
4	Marthe Koala	Burkina Faso	–	–	–	–	–	o	o	o	xxo	o	o	xxx				1.72	879		1939
6	Priscillah Tabunda	Kenya	–	o	o	o	o	o	o	o	o	xxx						1.66	806		1762
7	Ndeye Binta Thiombane	Senegal	–	–	o	o	xo	xo	o	o	xxx							1.63	771		1582
8	Hope Idhe	Nigeria	–	–	–	o	o	o	xo	xxx								1.60	736		1583
9	Annie Curty Oyono	Cameroon	o	–	o	o	o	o	xxo	xxx								1.60	736		1591
10	Nienka du Toit	South Africa	–	o	–	o	o	xxo	xxo	xxx								1.60	736		1546
11	Corlia Kruger	Namibia	–	o	–	o	o	xxo	xxx									1.57	701		1509
12	Francis Oluwakemi	Nigeria	o	o	o	o	o	xxx										1.54	666		1689
13	Elizabeth Dadzie	Ghana	–	–	xxo	–	xxx											1.48	599		1617

=== Shot put ===
Rank	Athlete	Nationality	#1	#2	#3	Result	Points	Notes	Total
1	Odile Ahouanwanou	Benin	x	12.70	15.02	15.02	862		2719
2	Uhunoma Osazuwa	Nigeria	11.93	11.05	12.55	12.55	698		2687
3	Annie Curty Oyono	Cameroon	11.23	10.76	11.49	11.49	627		2218
4	Nienka du Toit	South Africa	11.11	10.90	10.80	11.11	602		2148
5	Francis Oluwakemi	Nigeria	10.43	10.96	6.31	10.96	592		2281
6	Hope Idhe	Nigeria	10.09	10.86	9.65	10.86	586		2169
7	Marthe Koala	Burkina Faso	x	10.84	x	10.84	585		2524
8	Hoda Atef	Egypt	9.92	10.60	10.06	10.60	569		2407
9	Elizabeth Dadzie	Ghana	x	9.61	10.56	10.56	566		2183
10	Corlia Kruger	Namibia	8.08	9.55	9.27	9.55	500		2009
11	June Roelofse	South Africa	9.38	9.53	8.81	9.53	499		2205
12	Priscillah Tabunda	Kenya	7.85	7.71	8.35	8.35	422		2184
13	Ndeye Binta Thiombane	Senegal	7.74	7.44	7.35	7.74	383		1965

=== 200 metres ===
Wind:
Heat 1: -0.1 m/s, Heat 2: +0.8 m/s

Rank	Heat	Name	Nationality	Time	Points	Notes	Total
1	2	Francis Oluwakemi	Nigeria	24.10	971		3252
2	1	Odile Ahouanwanou	Benin	24.48	935		3654
3	1	Marthe Koala	Burkina Faso	24.72	913		3437
4	1	Uhunoma Osazuwa	Nigeria	24.90	896		3583
5	2	Hope Idhe	Nigeria	24.96	890		3059
6	1	Elizabeth Dadzie	Ghana	25.03	884		3067
7	2	Hoda Atef	Egypt	25.20	869		3276
8	2	Priscillah Tabunda	Kenya	25.32	858		3042
9	2	Annie Curty Oyono	Cameroon	25.71	823		3041
10	1	Nienka du Toit	South Africa	26.47	757		2905
11	1	June Roelofse	South Africa	26.79	729		2934
12	2	Corlia Kruger	Namibia	27.48	672		2681
13	2	Ndeye Binta Thiombane	Senegal	28.17	617		2582

=== Long jump ===
Rank	Athlete	Nationality	#1	#2	#3	Result	Points	Notes	Total
1	Uhunoma Osazuwa	Nigeria	6.05	x	x	6.05	865		4448
2	Hope Idhe	Nigeria	5.87	5.74	5.64	5.87	810		3869
3	Marthe Koala	Burkina Faso	x	5.65	5.78	5.78	783		4220
4	Elizabeth Dadzie	Ghana	5.72	5.68	5.71	5.72	765		3832
5	June Roelofse	South Africa	5.32	5.64	5.47	5.64	741		3675
6	Hoda Atef	Egypt	5.28	5.43	5.61	5.61	732		4008
7	Francis Oluwakemi	Nigeria	x	5.48	5.59	5.59	726		3978
8	Odile Ahouanwanou	Benin	5.55	5.16	5.53	5.55	715		4369
9	Priscillah Tabunda	Kenya	5.47	5.17	5.06	5.47	691		3733
10	Annie Curty Oyono	Cameroon	5.19	5.00	5.07	5.19	612		3653
11	Corlia Kruger	Namibia	4.97	4.91	5.17	5.17	606		3287
12	Nienka du Toit	South Africa	5.03	5.07	5.05	5.07	578		3483
13	Ndeye Binta Thiombane	Senegal	4.76	4.94	4.85	4.94	543		3125

=== Javelin throw ===
Rank	Athlete	Nationality	#1	#2	#3	Result	Points	Notes	Total
1	Odile Ahouanwanou	Benin	43.61	x	x	43.61	737		5106
2	Marthe Koala	Burkina Faso	39.73	41.31	43.04	43.04	726		4946
3	Hoda Atef	Egypt	32.90	39.30	37.51	39.30	654		4662
4	Uhunoma Osazuwa	Nigeria	37.25	37.63	36.15	37.63	622		5070
5	Francis Oluwakemi	Nigeria	30.51	37.08	29.61	37.08	611		4589
6	Hope Idhe	Nigeria	36.28	34.49	31.47	36.28	596		4465
7	Corlia Kruger	Namibia	31.28	35.11	31.25	35.11	574		3861
8	Priscillah Tabunda	Kenya	31.45	31.89	34.46	34.46	561		4294
9	Annie Curty Oyono	Cameroon	24.05	18.77	18.99	24.05	364		4017
10	June Roelofse	South Africa	x	x	23.78	23.78	359		4034
11	Ndeye Binta Thiombane	Senegal	20.57	15.81	19.95	20.57	399		3424
	Elizabeth Dadzie	Ghana				DNS	0		DNF
	Nienka du Toit	South Africa				DNS	0		DNF

=== 800 metres ===
Rank	Name	Nationality	Time	Points	Notes
1	Francis Oluwakemi	Nigeria	2:18.83	839	
2	Uhunoma Osazuwa	Nigeria	2:20.12	822	
3	Hoda Atef	Egypt	2:25.93	745	
4	Marthe Koala	Burkina Faso	2:28.03	718	
5	Annie Curty Oyono	Cameroon	2:31.53	674	
6	Ndeye Binta Thiombane	Senegal	2:33.72	647	
7	Odile Ahouanwanou	Benin	2:35.29	628	
8	June Roelofse	South Africa	2:37.13	606	
9	Corlia Kruger	Namibia	2:37.61	601	
10	Hope Idhe	Nigeria	2:38.09	595	
	Priscillah Tabunda	Kenya	DNS	0	

=== Final standings ===
The highest mark recorded in each event is highlighted in yellow

Rank	Athlete	Nationality	100m H	HJ	SP	200m	LJ	JT	800m	Points	Notes
1st place, gold medalist(s)	Uhunoma Osazuwa	Nigeria	13.86	1.81	12.55	24.90	6.05	37.63	2:20.12	5892	
2nd place, silver medalist(s)	Odile Ahouanwanou	Benin	14.00	1.72	15.02	24.48	5.55	43.61	2:35.29	5734	
3rd place, bronze medalist(s)	Marthe Koala	Burkina Faso	13.43	1.72	10.84	24.72	5.78	43.04	2:28.03	5664	
4	Francis Oluwakemi	Nigeria	13.69	1.54	10.96	24.10	5.59	37.08	2:18.83	5428	
5	Hoda Atef	Egypt	14.14	1.72	10.60	25.20	5.61	39.30	2:25.93	5407	
6	Hope Idhe	Nigeria	14.96	1.60	10.86	24.96	5.87	36.28	2:38.09	5060	
7	Annie Curty Oyono	Cameroon	14.90	1.60	11.49	25.71	5.19	24.05	2:31.53	4691	
8	June Roelofse	South Africa	15.11	1.72	9.53	26.79	5.64	23.78	2:37.13	4640	
9	Corlia Kruger	Namibia	15.26	1.57	9.55	27.48	5.17	35.11	2:37.61	4462	
10	Ndeye Binta Thiombane	Senegal	15.23	1.63	7.74	28.17	4.94	20.57	2:33.72	4071	
	Priscillah Tabunda	Kenya	14.16	1.66	8.35	25.32	5.47	34.46	DNS	DNF	
	Elizabeth Dadzie	Ghana	13.72	1.48	10.56	25.03	5.72	DNS	–	DNF	
	Nienka du Toit	South Africa	15.24	1.60	11.11	26.47	5.07	DNS	–	DNF	
