= 2014 African Championships in Athletics – Women's heptathlon =

The women's heptathlon event at the 2014 African Championships in Athletics was held on August 12–13 on Stade de Marrakech.

== Medalists ==
Gold	Silver	Bronze
Marthe Koala; Burkina Faso	Elizabeth Dadzie; Ghana	Bianca Erwee; South Africa

== Results ==
=== 100 metres hurdles ===
Wind:
Heat 1: -0.3 m/s, Heat 2: -0.6 m/s

Rank	Heat	Name	Nationality	Time	Points	Notes
1	2	Marthe Koala	Burkina Faso	13.72	1018	
2	1	Yasmina Omrani	Algeria	14.17	954	
3	2	Elizabeth Dadzie	Ghana	14.28	939	
4	2	Brigitte Ekongolo Nguea	Cameroon	14.54	903	
5	1	Bianca Erwee	South Africa	14.77	872	
6	2	Corlia Kruger	Namibia	15.14	823	
7	1	Nada Chroudi	Tunisia	15.21	814	
8	1	Wedian Mokhtar	Egypt	15.45	783	
9	1	Anny Oyono	Cameroon	15.49	778	
	2	Odile Ahouanwanou	Benin	DQ	0	R168.7b

=== High jump ===
Rank	Athlete	Nationality	1.45	1.48	1.51	1.54	1.57	1.60	1.63	1.66	1.69	1.72	1.75	1.78	Result	Points	Notes	Total
1	Bianca Erwee	South Africa	–	–	–	–	–	–	o	–	xo	o	xo	xxx	1.75	916		1788
2	Yasmina Omrani	Algeria	–	–	–	–	–	–	o	o	xxo	o	xxx		1.72	879		1833
3	Corlia Kruger	Namibia	–	–	o	o	o	xo	xxo	xo	xxx				1.66	806		1629
4	Wedian Mokhtar	Egypt	–	–	–	–	o	o	o	xxx					1.63	806		1554
5	Odile Ahouanwanou	Benin	–	–	o	–	–	xo	xo	xxx					1.63	771		771
6	Nada Chroudi	Tunisia	–	–	o	xo	o	o	xxx						1.60	736		1550
7	Elizabeth Dadzie	Ghana	o	–	o	–	xo	xxx							1.57	701		1640
8	Marthe Koala	Burkina Faso	o	o	o	o	xxx								1.54	666		1684
9	Anny Oyono	Cameroon	o	–	o	xxx									1.51	632		1410
	Brigitte Ekongolo Nguea	Cameroon													NM	0		903

=== Shot put ===
Rank	Athlete	Nationality	#1	#2	#3	Result	Points	Notes	Total
1	Odile Ahouanwanou	Benin	13.40	12.95	14.02	14.02	795		1566
2	Yasmina Omrani	Algeria	12.37	13.25	12.91	13.25	744		2577
3	Nada Chroudi	Tunisia	12.64	12.51	13.12	13.12	735		2285
4	Anny Oyono	Cameroon	12.23	11.16	11.44	12.23	676		2086
5	Marthe Koala	Burkina Faso	12.07	12.21	12.03	12.21	675		2359
6	Bianca Erwee	South Africa	10.99	10.84	x	10.99	594		2382
7	Elizabeth Dadzie	Ghana	10.59	10.71	10.07	10.71	576		2216
8	Brigitte Ekongolo Nguea	Cameroon	7.63	9.36	9.56	9.56	501		1404
9	Corlia Kruger	Namibia	9.23	9.35	9.07	9.35	487		2116
10	Wedian Mokhtar	Egypt	9.15	9.21	9.20	9.21	478		2032

=== 200 metres ===
Wind:
Heat 1: -0.1 m/s, Heat 2: -0.3 m/s

Rank	Heat	Name	Nationality	Time	Points	Notes	Total
1	2	Marthe Koala	Burkina Faso	24.37	945		3304
2	1	Yasmina Omrani	Algeria	25.00	887		3464
3	2	Odile Ahouanwanou	Benin	25.22	867		2433
4	1	Elizabeth Dadzie	Ghana	25.30	859		3075
5	1	Anny Oyono	Cameroon	26.01	796		2882
6	1	Bianca Erwee	South Africa	26.11	788		3170
7	2	Nada Chroudi	Tunisia	26.65	741		3026
8	2	Brigitte Ekongolo Nguea	Cameroon	26.74	734		2138
9	1	Corlia Kruger	Namibia	26.92	718		2834
9	2	Wedian Mokhtar	Egypt	26.92	718		2750

=== Long jump ===
Rank	Athlete	Nationality	#1	#2	#3	Result	Points	Notes	Total
1	Marthe Koala	Burkina Faso	5.49	5.71	6.03	6.03	859		4163
2	Elizabeth Dadzie	Ghana	5.69	5.96	x	5.96	837		3912
3	Bianca Erwee	South Africa	5.26	x	5.43	5.43	680		3912
4	Wedian Mokhtar	Egypt	5.14	5.32	x	5.32	648		3398
5	Corlia Kruger	Namibia	5.31	x	x	5.31	645		3479
6	Anny Oyono	Cameroon	5.29	5.12	4.96	5.29	640		3522
7	Nada Chroudi	Tunisia	5.12	5.03	5.03	5.12	592		3618
8	Odile Ahouanwanou	Benin	4.94	4.80	5.02	5.02	565		2998
9	Brigitte Ekongolo Nguea	Cameroon	4.81	4.33	4.41	4.81	508		2646
	Yasmina Omrani	Algeria				DNS	0		DNF

=== Javelin throw ===
Rank	Athlete	Nationality	#1	#2	#3	Result	Points	Notes	Total
1	Odile Ahouanwanou	Benin	40.64	x	x	40.64	680		3678
2	Nada Chroudi	Tunisia	40.51	38.97	38.06	40.51	677		4295
3	Elizabeth Dadzie	Ghana	x	36.22	38.70	38.70	642		4554
4	Marthe Koala	Burkina Faso	37.41	26.28	33.19	37.41	618		4781
5	Bianca Erwee	South Africa	x	35.27	37.21	37.21	614		4464
6	Corlia Kruger	Namibia	25.93	31.92	32.54	32.54	525		4004
7	Brigitte Ekongolo Nguea	Cameroon	31.04	x	32.39	32.39	522		3168
8	Wedian Mokhtar	Egypt	x	28.34	28.18	28.34	445		3843
9	Anny Oyono	Cameroon	x	23.71	26.86	26.86	417		3939

=== 800 metres ===
Rank	Name	Nationality	Time	Points	Notes
1	Elizabeth Dadzie	Ghana	2:26.91	732	
2	Nada Chroudi	Tunisia	2:28.15	716	
3	Anny Oyono	Cameroon	2:31.08	679	
4	Marthe Koala	Burkina Faso	2:31.61	673	
5	Wedian Mokhtar	Egypt	2:32.85	658	
6	Odile Ahouanwanou	Benin	2:35.01	631	
7	Bianca Erwee	South Africa	2:35.77	622	
8	Corlia Kruger	Namibia	2:35.88	621	
9	Brigitte Ekongolo Nguea	Cameroon	2:40.04	572	

=== Final standings ===
The highest mark recorded in each event is highlighted in yellow

Rank	Athlete	Nationality	100m H	HJ	SP	200m	LJ	JT	800m	Points	Notes
1st place, gold medalist(s)	Marthe Koala	Burkina Faso	13.72	1.54	12.21	24.37	6.03	37.41	2:31.61	5454	
2nd place, silver medalist(s)	Elizabeth Dadzie	Ghana	14.28	1.57	10.71	25.30	5.96	38.70	2:26.91	5286	
3rd place, bronze medalist(s)	Bianca Erwee	South Africa	14.77	1.75	10.99	26.11	5.43	37.21	2:35.77	5086	
4	Nada Chroudi	Tunisia	15.21	1.60	13.12	26.65	5.12	40.51	2:28.15	5011	
5	Corlia Kruger	Namibia	15.14	1.66	9.35	26.92	5.31	32.54	2:35.88	4625	
6	Anny Oyono	Cameroon	15.49	1.51	12.23	26.01	5.29	26.86	2:31.08	4618	
7	Wedian Mokhtar	Egypt	15.45	1.63	9.21	26.92	5.32	28.34	2:32.85	4501	
8	Odile Ahouanwanou	Benin	DQ	1.63	14.02	25.22	5.02	40.64	2:35.01	4309	
9	Brigitte Ekongolo Nguea	Cameroon	14.54	NM	9.56	26.74	4.81	32.39	2:40.04	3740	
	Yasmina Omrani	Algeria	14.17	1.72	13.25	25.00	DNS	–	–	DNF	
