= Selloane Tsoaeli =

Mosotho athletics competitor (born 1977)

Medal record

Women's athletics

Representing Lesotho

African Games
Bronze medal – third place	2011 Maputo	Heptathlon

African Championships
Gold medal – first place	2010 Nairobi	High jump
Bronze medal – third place	2010 Nairobi	Heptathlon

Selloane Joyce Tsoaeli (born 10 July 1977) is a female track and field athlete from Lesotho who competes in the heptathlon and the high jump. She was the high jump gold medallist at the 2010 African Championships in Athletics and was a heptathlon bronze medallist at the same event. She also took heptathlon bronze at the 2011 All-Africa Games.

Tsoaeli represented Lesotho at the World Championships in Athletics (2007, 2009) and at the Commonwealth Games (2002, 2010, 2014). She was her nation's flag bearer at the 2010 Commonwealth Games opening ceremony.

Her personal bests of 5588 points for the heptathlon and 1.79 m (5 ft 10 1/4 in) for the high jump are Lesotho national records. She also holds the national marks in the 100 metres hurdles, long jump, triple jump, shot put and javelin throw.

== Personal bests ==
- 100 metres – 13.29 (2007)
- 200 metres – 26.07 (2010)
- 800 metres – 2:15.82 (2010)
- 100 metres hurdles – 14.62 (2011)
- High jump – 1.79 m (2012)
- Long jump – 6.02 m (2011)
- Shot put – 11.99 m (2011)
- Javelin throw – 37.52 m (2012)
- Heptathlon – 5590 pts (2011)
- Triple jump – 12.72 (2009)

All information from All-Athletics.

== International competitions ==
Year	Competition	Venue	Position	Event	Notes
1999	All-Africa Games	Johannesburg, South Africa	—	High jump	NM
2002	Commonwealth Games	Manchester, United Kingdom	15th	Long jump	5.49 m
2007	World Championships	Osaka, Japan	8th (heats)	100 m	13.29
2008	African Championships	Addis Ababa, Ethiopia	4th	Heptathlon	4404 pts NR
2009	African Combined Events Championships	Réduit, Mauritius	2nd	Heptathlon	5116 pts
2009	World Championships	Berlin, Germany	43rd (heats)	200 m	28.34
2010	African Championships	Nairobi, Kenya	1st	High jump	1.75 m
2010	African Championships	Nairobi, Kenya	3rd	Heptathlon	5302 pts
2010	Commonwealth Games	New Delhi, India	10th	High jump	1.78 m
2010	Commonwealth Games	New Delhi, India	—	Heptathlon	DNF
2010	IAAF Continental Cup	Split, Croatia	7th	High jump	1.78 m
2011	All-Africa Games	Maputo, Mozambique	6th	High jump	1.70 m
2011	All-Africa Games	Maputo, Mozambique	3rd	Heptathlon	5590 pts
2012	African Combined Events Championships	Réduit, Mauritius	3rd	Heptathlon	5194 pts
2012	African Championships	Porto Novo, Benin	—	Heptathlon	DNF

== See also ==
- List of champions of the African Championships in Athletics
- Lesotho at the 2009 World Championships in Athletics
- Lesotho at the 2002 Commonwealth Games
- Lesotho at the 2010 Commonwealth Games
