= 2016 African Championships in Athletics – Women's heptathlon =

The women's heptathlon event at the 2016 African Championships in Athletics was held on 24 and 25 June in Kings Park Stadium.

== Results ==
The highest mark recorded in each event is highlighted in yellow

Rank	Athlete	Nationality	100m H	HJ	SP	200m	LJ	JT	800m	Points	Notes
1st place, gold medalist(s)	Uhunoma Osazuwa	Nigeria	13.32	1.83	12.87	24.19	6.24	36.30	2:17.50	6153	CR, NR
2nd place, silver medalist(s)	Marthe Koala	Burkina Faso	13.27 =NR	1.77	12.40	24.56	5.90	40.75	2:21.00	5952	
3rd place, bronze medalist(s)	Elizabeth Dadzie	Ghana	13.67	1.62	11.60	24.89	6.25	40.33	2:20.85	5730	
4	Houda Hagras	Egypt	14.01	1.68	11.99	25.40	5.97	40.60	2:27.90	5555	NR
5	Nada Charoudi	Tunisia	14.53	1.53	13.08	25.73	5.77	42.31	2:22.46	5396	NR
6	Neal Maya	Liberia	14.45	1.56	11.22	26.22	5.32	38.75	2:26.31	5024	
7	Nienka du Toit	South Africa	14.73	1.59	13.26	DQ	5.58	35.96	2:42.36	4206	
