= 2022 African Championships in Athletics – Women's heptathlon =

The women's heptathlon event at the 2022 African Championships in Athletics was held on 8 and 9 June in Port Louis, Mauritius.

== Medalists ==
Gold	Silver	Bronze
Odile Ahouanwanou; Benin	Shannon Verster; South Africa	Nada Chroudi; Tunisia

== Results ==
=== 100 metres hurdles ===
Wind: +0.4 m/s

Rank	Lane	Name	Nationality	Time	Points	Notes
1	1	Odile Ahouanwanou	Benin	13.82	1004	
2	6	Shannon Verster	South Africa	14.44	917	
3	5	Kemi Petersen	Nigeria	14.47	913	
4	7	Nada Chroudi	Tunisia	14.81	867	
5	3	Wedian Mokhtar	Egypt	15.17	819	
6	2	Adèle Mafogang Tenkeu	Cameroon	15.83	735	
7	4	Aminata Bah	Mali	15.88	729	

=== High jump ===
Rank	Athlete	Nationality	1.40	1.43	1.46	1.49	1.52	1.55	1.58	1.61	1.64	1.67	1.70	1.73	1.76	Result	Points	Notes	Total
1	Shannon Verster	South Africa	–	–	–	–	–	–	o	–	o	–	xo	o	xxx	1.73	891		1808
2	Odile Ahouanwanou	Benin	–	–	–	–	–	–	–	o	–	o	o	xxx		1.70	855		1859
3	Wedian Mokhtar	Egypt	–	–	o	–	–	–	o	o	xxx					1.61	747		1566
4	Adèle Mafogang Tenkeu	Cameroon	o	–	o	o	o	o	xxo	xxx						1.58	712		1447
5	Nada Chroudi	Tunisia	–	–	–	o	o	o	xxx							1.55	678		1545
6	Aminata Bah	Mali	o	o	o	xo	xo	xxx								1.52	644		1373
7	Kemi Petersen	Nigeria	o	–	o	xo	xxx									1.49	610		1523

=== Shot put ===
Rank	Athlete	Nationality	#1	#2	#3	Result	Points	Notes	Total
1	Odile Ahouanwanou	Benin	14.13	13.89	13.47	14.13	803		2662
2	Nada Chroudi	Tunisia	12.12	x	12.40	12.40	688		2233
3	Kemi Petersen	Nigeria	x	8.37	10.88	10.88	587		2110
4	Shannon Verster	South Africa	10.37	10.11	10.46	10.46	560		2368
5	Wedian Mokhtar	Egypt	x	10.03	9.03	10.03	531		2097
6	Adèle Mafogang Tenkeu	Cameroon	x	8.51	9.43	9.43	492		1939
7	Aminata Bah	Mali	8.24	9.09	9.12	9.12	472		1845

=== 200 metres ===
Wind: -0.2 m/s

Rank	Lane	Name	Nationality	Time	Points	Notes	Total
1	8	Odile Ahouanwanou	Benin	24.73	912		3574
2	5	Kemi Petersen	Nigeria	25.09	879		2989
3	2	Adèle Mafogang Tenkeu	Cameroon	25.81	814		2753
4	6	Shannon Verster	South Africa	25.84	811		3179
5	7	Nada Chroudi	Tunisia	26.76	732		2965
6	4	Aminata Bah	Mali	27.80	647		2492
7	3	Wedian Mokhtar	Egypt	28.14	620		2717

=== Long jump ===
Rank	Athlete	Nationality	#1	#2	#3	Result	Points	Notes	Total
1	Odile Ahouanwanou	Benin	5.72w	5.94w	5.96w	5.96w	837		4411
2	Nada Chroudi	Tunisia	5.19w	5.76w	5.91	5.91	822		3787
3	Shannon Verster	South Africa	5.30w	5.45w	5.28w	5.45w	686		3865
4	Kemi Petersen	Nigeria	5.40	5.27w	5.35w	5.40	671		3660
5	Aminata Bah	Mali	4.95w	5.06w	4.97w	5.06w	576		3068
6	Adèle Mafogang Tenkeu	Cameroon	4.41w	5.01	4.86	5.01	562		3315
	Wedian Mokhtar	Egypt				DNS	0		DNF

=== Javelin throw ===
Rank	Athlete	Nationality	#1	#2	#3	Result	Points	Notes	Total
1	Odile Ahouanwanou	Benin	42.29	–	–	42.29	711		5122
2	Nada Chroudi	Tunisia	38.37	x	38.39	38.39	636		4423
3	Shannon Verster	South Africa	38.17	x	–	38.17	632		4497
4	Kemi Petersen	Nigeria	32.19	33.24	33.33	33.33	540		4200
5	Adèle Mafogang Tenkeu	Cameroon	31.17	30.07	30.05	31.17	499		3814
6	Aminata Bah	Mali	28.32	25.99	26.79	28.32	445		3513

=== 800 metres ===
Rank	Name	Nationality	Time	Points	Notes
1	Adèle Mafogang Tenkeu	Cameroon	2:14.82	895	
2	Shannon Verster	South Africa	2:19.37	832	
3	Kemi Petersen	Nigeria	2:23.98	770	
4	Nada Chroudi	Tunisia	2:29.94	694	
5	Odile Ahouanwanou	Benin	2:34.80	634	
6	Aminata Bah	Mali	3:04.44	325	

=== Final standings ===
The highest mark recorded in each event is highlighted in yellow

Rank	Athlete	Nationality	100m H	HJ	SP	200m	LJ	JT	800m	Points	Notes
1st place, gold medalist(s)	Odile Ahouanwanou	Benin	13.82	1.70	14.13	24.73	5.96w	42.29	2:34.80	5756	
2nd place, silver medalist(s)	Shannon Verster	South Africa	14.44	1.73	10.46	25.84	5.45w	38.17	2:19.37	5329	
3rd place, bronze medalist(s)	Nada Chroudi	Tunisia	14.81	1.55	12.40	26.76	5.91	38.39	2:29.94	5117	
4	Kemi Petersen	Nigeria	14.47	1.49	10.88	25.09	5.40	33.33	2:23.98	4970	
5	Adèle Mafogang Tenkeu	Cameroon	15.83	1.58	9.43	25.81	5.01	31.17	2:14.82	4709	
6	Aminata Bah	Mali	15.88	1.52	9.12	27.80	5.06w	28.32	3:04.44	3838	
	Wedian Mokhtar	Egypt	15.17	1.61	10.03	28.14	DNS	–	–	DNF	
