= Athletics at the 2019 African Games – Women's heptathlon =

The women's heptathlon event at the 2019 African Games was held on 28 and 29 August in Rabat.

== Medalists ==
Gold	Silver	Bronze
Marthe Koala; Burkina Faso	Kemi Francis; Nigeria	Nada Charoudi; Tunisia

== Results ==
=== 100 metres hurdles ===
Wind: +1.3 m/s

Rank	Lane	Name	Nationality	Time	Points	Notes
1	2	Marthe Koala	Burkina Faso	13.13	1105	
2	8	Kemi Francis	Nigeria	13.81	1005	
3	7	Hoda Hagras	Egypt	14.25	943	
4	4	Noura Ennadi	Morocco	14.28	939	
5	3	Nada Charoudi	Tunisia	14.39	924	
6	6	Aminata Bah	Mali	15.21	814	
7	5	Regina Yeboah	Ghana	15.23	811	

=== High jump ===
Rank	Athlete	Nationality	1.35	1.38	1.41	1.44	1.47	1.50	1.53	1.56	1.59	1.62	1.65	1.68	1.71	1.74	Result	Points	Notes	Total
1	Hoda Hagras	Egypt	–	–	–	–	–	–	–	–	o	–	o	o	xo	xxx	1.71	867		1810
1	Regina Yeboah	Ghana	–	–	–	–	–	–	–	o	o	o	o	o	xo	xxx	1.71	867		1678
3	Marthe Koala	Burkina Faso	–	–	–	–	–	–	–	–	o	–	o	xxo	xxx		1.68	830		1935
4	Kemi Francis	Nigeria	–	–	–	–	xo	o	o	o	o	xo	xxo	xxx			1.65	795		1800
5	Nada Charoudi	Tunisia	–	–	–	–	–	o	xo	xo	o	xxx					1.59	724		1648
6	Aminata Bah	Mali	–	–	–	o	o	o	o	o	xxx						1.56	689		1503
7	Noura Ennadi	Morocco	o	o	xo	o	o	xo	xxx								1.50	621		1560

=== Shot put ===
Rank	Athlete	Nationality	#1	#2	#3	Result	Points	Notes	Total
1	Nada Charoudi	Tunisia	12.66	13.01	12.29	13.01	728		2376
2	Marthe Koala	Burkina Faso	12.48	12.19	12.56	12.56	698		2633
3	Kemi Francis	Nigeria	9.71	10.16	10.96	10.96	592		2392
4	Aminata Bah	Mali	8.26	9.97	10.39	10.39	555		2058
5	Hoda Hagras	Egypt	9.94	x	10.37	10.37	554		2364
6	Regina Yeboah	Ghana	x	8.80	9.32	9.32	485		2163
7	Noura Ennadi	Morocco	8.39	8.13	6.96	8.39	425		1985

=== 200 metres ===
Wind: +0.4 m/s

Rank	Lane	Name	Nationality	Time	Points	Notes	Total
1	3	Kemi Francis	Nigeria	24.21	961		3353
2	7	Marthe Koala	Burkina Faso	24.67	917		3550
3	5	Noura Ennadi	Morocco	25.11	877		2862
4	2	Hoda Hagras	Egypt	25.43	848		3212
5	4	Regina Yeboah	Ghana	25.59	833		2996
6	6	Nada Charoudi	Tunisia	26.10	788		3164
7	8	Aminata Bah	Mali	26.43	760		2818

=== Long jump ===
Rank	Athlete	Nationality	#1	#2	#3	Result	Points	Notes	Total
1	Marthe Koala	Burkina Faso	6.20	6.16	5.83	6.20	912		4462
2	Hoda Hagras	Egypt	5.83	5.92	5.97	5.97	840		4052
3	Nada Charoudi	Tunisia	5.77	5.96	5.88	5.96	837		4001
4	Kemi Francis	Nigeria	5.78	5.76	5.62	5.78	783		4136
5	Aminata Bah	Mali	5.55	5.53	x	5.55	715		3533
6	Noura Ennadi	Morocco	5.15	5.32	5.28	5.32	648		3510
7	Regina Yeboah	Ghana	5.15	x	x	5.15	601		3597

=== Javelin throw ===
Rank	Athlete	Nationality	#1	#2	#3	Result	Points	Notes	Total
1	Nada Charoudi	Tunisia	39.86	44.51	40.44	44.51	754		4755
2	Kemi Francis	Nigeria	36.74	32.85	40.83	40.83	683		4819
3	Marthe Koala	Burkina Faso	38.31	40.39	37.65	40.39	675		5137
4	Hoda Hagras	Egypt	35.81	40.17	x	40.17	671		4723
5	Regina Yeboah	Ghana	29.55	27.25	x	29.55	468		4065
6	Aminata Bah	Mali	x	x	29.31	29.31	464		3997
7	Noura Ennadi	Morocco	24.27	23.05	23.23	24.27	369		3879

=== 800 metres ===
Rank	Name	Nationality	Time	Points	Notes
1	Kemi Francis	Nigeria	2:17.02	864	
2	Noura Ennadi	Morocco	2:18.96	838	
3	Regina Yeboah	Ghana	2:22.34	792	
4	Marthe Koala	Burkina Faso	2:27.18	729	
5	Hoda Hagras	Egypt	2:42.07	549	
6	Nada Charoudi	Tunisia	2:42.25	547	
7	Aminata Bah	Mali	2:50.49	459	

=== Final standings ===
The highest mark recorded in each event is highlighted in yellow

Rank	Athlete	Nationality	100m H	HJ	SP	200m	LJ	JT	800m	Points	Notes
1st place, gold medalist(s)	Marthe Koala	Burkina Faso	13.13	1.68	12.56	24.67	6.20	40.39	2:27.18	5866	
2nd place, silver medalist(s)	Kemi Francis	Nigeria	13.81	1.65	10.96	24.21	5.78	40.83	2:17.02	5683	
3rd place, bronze medalist(s)	Nada Charoudi	Tunisia	14.39	1.59	13.01	26.10	5.96	44.51	2:42.25	5302	
4	Hoda Hagras	Egypt	14.25	1.71	10.37	25.43	5.97	40.17	2:42.07	5272	
5	Regina Yeboah	Ghana	15.23	1.71	9.32	25.59	5.15	29.55	2:22.34	4857	
6	Noura Ennadi	Morocco	14.28	1.50	8.39	25.11	5.32	24.27	2:18.96	4717	
7	Aminata Bah	Mali	15.21	1.56	10.39	26.43	5.55	29.31	2:50.49	4456	
