= 2018 African Championships in Athletics – Women's heptathlon =

The women's heptathlon event at the 2018 African Championships in Athletics was held on 4 and 5 August in Asaba, Nigeria.

== Medalists ==
Gold	Silver	Bronze
Odile Ahouanwanou; Benin	Marthe Koala; Burkina Faso	Not awarded

== Results ==
=== 100 metres hurdles ===
Rank	Name	Nationality	Time	Points	Notes
1	Marthe Koala	Burkina Faso	13.35	1072	
2	Odile Ahouanwanou	Benin	13.71	1020	
3	Hoda Hagras	Egypt	14.15	957	
	Nada Chroudi	Tunisia	DNS	0	

=== High jump ===
Rank	Athlete	Nationality	1.62	1.65	1.68	1.71	1.74	1.77	1.80	1.83	Result	Points	Notes	Total
1	Marthe Koala	Burkina Faso	o	–	o	o	o	o	o	xxx	1.80	987		2074
2	Odile Ahouanwanou	Benin	o	xo	o	o	o	o	xxx		1.77	949		1982
3	Hoda Hagras	Egypt	o	–	o	o	xxo	xxx			1.74	912		1882

=== Shot put ===
Rank	Athlete	Nationality	#1	#2	#3	Result	Points	Notes	Total
1	Odile Ahouanwanou	Benin				14.10	801		2762
2	Marthe Koala	Burkina Faso				13.02	729		2779
3	Hoda Hagras	Egypt				10.49	562		2422

=== 200 metres ===
Wind: ? m/s

Rank	Lane	Name	Nationality	Time	Points	Notes	Total
1	5	Marthe Koala	Burkina Faso	24.24	958		3737
2	3	Odile Ahouanwanou	Benin	24.76	909		3671
3	4	Hoda Hagras	Egypt	25.23	866		3288

=== Long jump ===
Rank	Athlete	Nationality	#1	#2	#3	Result	Points	Notes	Total
1	Marthe Koala	Burkina Faso	6.38	x	6.38	6.38	969		4706
2	Odile Ahouanwanou	Benin	5.59	5.62	5.94	5.94	831		4502
3	Hoda Hagras	Egypt	5.53	5.50	5.77	5.77	780		4068

=== Javelin throw ===
Rank	Athlete	Nationality	#1	#2	#3	Result	Points	Notes	Total
1	Odile Ahouanwanou	Benin				44.80	760		5262
2	Marthe Koala	Burkina Faso				32.29	520		5226
3	Hoda Hagras	Egypt				35.35	578		4646

=== 800 metres ===
Rank	Name	Nationality	Time	Points	Notes
1	Marthe Koala	Burkina Faso	2:26.20	741	
2	Odile Ahouanwanou	Benin	2:26.50	737	
	Hoda Hagras	Egypt	DNS	0	

=== Final standings ===
The highest mark recorded in each event is highlighted in yellow

Rank	Athlete	Nationality	100m H	HJ	SP	200m	LJ	JT	800m	Points	Notes
1st place, gold medalist(s)	Odile Ahouanwanou	Benin	13.71	1.77	14.10	24.76	5.94	44.80	2:26.50	5999	
2nd place, silver medalist(s)	Marthe Koala	Burkina Faso	13.35	1.80	13.02	24.24	6.38	32.29	2:26.20	5967	
	Hoda Hagras	Egypt	14.15	1.74	10.49	25.23	5.77	35.35	DNS	DNF	
	Nada Chroudi	Tunisia	DNS	–	–	–	–	–	–	DNS	
