= Odile Ahouanwanou =

Beninese athlete (born 1991)

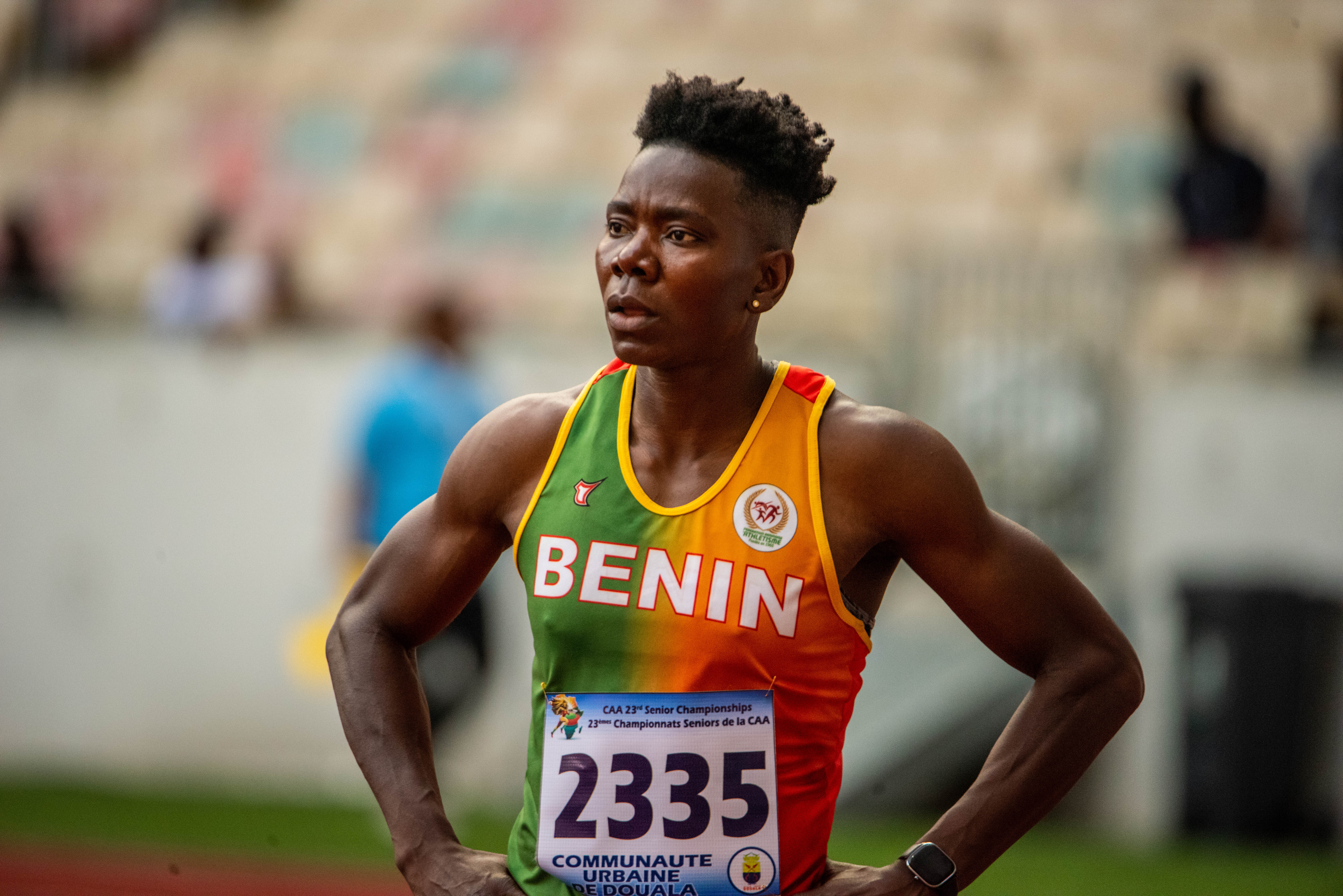
- Ahouanwanou in 2024

Personal information
- Nationality: Beninese
- Born: 5 January 1991 (age 35) Savalou, Benin

Sport
- Sport: Track and field
- Event: Heptathlon (and associated events)

Achievements and titles
- Personal bests: Heptathlon: 6210; 100 m: 13.27; 200 m: 24.01; 800 m: 2:20.45; Long jump: 6.00 m High jump: 1.78 m Shot put: 15.24 m Javelin: 46.74 m
Medal record
Women's athletics
Representing Benin
African Games
Gold medal – first place	2023 Accra	Heptathlon
Silver medal – second place	2015 Brazzaville	Heptathlon
Bronze medal – third place	2019 Rabat	Shot put
African Championships
Gold medal – first place	2018 Asaba	Heptathlon
Gold medal – first place	2022 Saint Pierre	Heptathlon
Gold medal – first place	2024 Douala	Heptathlon
Gold medal – first place	2026 Accra	Heptathlon
Islamic Solidarity Games
Gold medal – first place	2017 Baku	100 m hurdles
- Updated on 19 May 2017

Odile Ahouanwanou (born 5 January 1991) is a Beninese heptathlete, who also specialises in the 100 metres hurdles; she holds Beninese records in both events. She competed at the 2012 Summer Olympics, 2015 African Games and two African Championships in Athletics, and won a silver medal in the heptathlon at the 2015 African Games.

== Competition ==
Ahouanwanou debuted internationally at the 2012 African Championships in Athletics in Porto-Novo, Benin. She competed in the heptathlon and finished sixth overall with a points score of 4983, 941 points behind the gold medalist. Ahouanwanou's best result in an individual discipline was fourth in both the javelin and shot put. At the 2012 Summer Olympics she competed in the 100 metres hurdles. She placed eighth out of nine competitors in Heat 6, setting a new Beninese national record at 14.76 seconds.

Ahouanwanou's next major competition was the 2014 African Championships in Athletics, where she finished eighth in the heptathlon with 4309 points. She won the shot put and javelin disciplines, but she was disqualified in the 100 metres hurdles. Ahouanwanou then competed in the 2015 African Games, where she won the silver medal in the heptathlon with a points score of 5734. She finished first in the shot put and in the javelin, second in the 200 metres, fourth in the high jump, fifth in the 100 metres hurdles, seven in the 800 metres and eighth in the long jump.

She finished in 8th place in the heptathlon at the 2019 World Championships, with a new national record points total of 6210.
