= 2010 African Championships in Athletics – Women's high jump =

African athletic event

The women's high jump at the 2010 African Championships in Athletics was held on July 30.

== Results ==
Rank	Athlete	Nationality	1.55	1.60	1.65	1.70	1.75	Result	Notes
1st place, gold medalist(s)	Ts'oalei Selloane	Lesotho	–	–	o	xo	xxo	1.75	
2nd place, silver medalist(s)	Lissa Labiche	Seychelles	o	o	o	o	xxx	1.70	
3rd place, bronze medalist(s)	Cherotich Koech	Kenya	xo	xxx				1.55	
	Agatha Wambui	Kenya	xxx					NM	
	Catherine Kagwiria	Kenya						DNS	
