= Elizabeth Dadzie =

Ghanaian athlete (born 1993)

Personal information
- Born: 21 March 1993 (age 33) Accra, Ghana
- Education: Middle Tennessee State University
- Height: 1.60 m (5 ft 3 in)
- Weight: 58 kg (128 lb)

Sport
- Sport: Athletics
- Event: Heptathlon
- College team: Middle Tennessee State Blue Raiders
Medal record
Women's athletics
Representing Ghana
African Championships
Silver medal – second place	2014 Marrakesh	Heptathlon
Bronze medal – third place	2016 Durban	Heptathlon

Elizabeth Dadzie (born 21 March 1993) is a Ghanaian athlete competing in the combined events. She represented her country at two consecutive Commonwealth Games. She also won two medals at the African Championships.

== International competitions ==
Year	Competition	Venue	Position	Event	Notes
Representing Ghana
2014	Commonwealth Games	Glasgow, United Kingdom	19th (q)	Long jump	6.11 m
2014	African Championships	Marrakesh, Morocco	6th	Long jump	6.14 m
2014	African Championships	Marrakesh, Morocco	2nd	Heptathlon	5286 pts
2015	African Games	Brazzaville, Republic of the Congo	6th	100 m hurdles	13.60
2015	African Games	Brazzaville, Republic of the Congo	–	Heptathlon	DNF
2016	African Championships	Durban, South Africa	3rd	Heptathlon	5730 pts
2018	Commonwealth Games	Gold Coast, Australia	12th	Heptathlon	4668 pts

== Personal bests ==
Outdoor
- 100 metres – 12.17 (+0.2 m/s, Cape Girardeau 2017)
- 200 metres – 24.50 (+1.6 m/s, Auburn 2016)
- 800 metres – 2:19.10 (Gold Coast 2018)
- 100 metres hurdles – 13.42 (+1.4 m/s, Gulf Shores 2015)
- High jump – 1.67 (El Paso 2017)
- Long jump – 6.34 (0.0 m/s, El Paso 2017)
- Triple jump – 12.35 (0.0 m/s, Mesa 2014)
- Shot put – 11.67 (El Paso 2017)
- Javelin throw – 40.33 (Durban 2016)
- Heptathlon – 5832 (El Paso 2017)
Indoor
- 60 metres – 8.09 (Nashville 2015)
- 200 metres – 25.75 (Nashville 2016)
- 400 metres – 59.07 (Shawnee 2014)
- 800 metres – 2:26.77 (Birmingham, AL 2018)
- 60 metres hurdles – 8.47 (Geneva, OH 2015)
- High jump – 1.59 (Birmingham, AL 2018)
- Long jump – 6.23 (New York 2014)
- Triple jump – 12.40 (Geneva, OH 2015)
- Shot put – 11.42 (Warrensburg 2015)
- Pentathlon – 3758 (Birmingham 2018) NR
