= Athletics at the 2023 African Games – Women's heptathlon =

The women's heptathlon event at the 2023 African Games was held on 20 and 21 March 2024 in Accra, Ghana.

== Medalists ==
Gold	Silver	Bronze
Odile Ahouanwanou; Benin	Kemi Francis-Petersen; Nigeria	Adèle Mafogang Tenkeu; Cameroon

== Results ==
=== 100 metres hurdles ===
Wind: +1.5 m/s

Rank	Lane	Name	Nationality	Time	Points	Notes
1	6	Odile Ahouanwanou	Benin	14.18	953	
2	7	Kemi Francis-Petersen	Nigeria	14.49	910	
3	3	Shannon Verster	South Africa	14.59	897	
4	5	Adèle Mafogang Tenkeu	Cameroon	15.45	783	
5	4	Nada Charoudi	Tunisia	21.17	212	

=== High jump ===
Rank	Athlete	Nationality	1.46	1.49	1.52	1.55	1.58	1.61	1.64	1.67	1.70	1.73	1.76	1.79	1.82	Result	Points	Notes	Total
1	Odile Ahouanwanou	Benin	–	–	–	–	o	o	o	o	o	o	xxo	xo	xx	1.79	966	NR	1919
2	Shannon Verster	South Africa	–	–	–	–	–	o	–	o	o	xxx				1.70	855		1752
3	Adèle Mafogang Tenkeu	Cameroon	–	–	o	o	o	o	xo	o	xxx					1.67	818		1601
4	Kemi Francis-Petersen	Nigeria	o	o	o	o	o	xo	o	xxx						1.64	783		1693
5	Nada Charoudi	Tunisia	–	–	o	xo	xo	xxo	xxx							1.61	747		959

=== Shot put ===
Rank	Athlete	Nationality	#1	#2	#3	Result	Points	Notes	Total
1	Odile Ahouanwanou	Benin	13.61	12.97	12.55	13.61	768		2687
2	Nada Charoudi	Tunisia	13.31	13.46	13.20	13.46	758		1717
3	Shannon Verster	South Africa	10.45	10.94	10.35	10.94	591		2343
4	Adèle Mafogang Tenkeu	Cameroon	x	10.36	10.22	10.36	553		2154
5	Kemi Francis-Petersen	Nigeria	x	9.53	9.23	9.53	499		2192

=== 200 metres ===
Wind: -1.6 m/s

Rank	Lane	Name	Nationality	Time	Points	Notes	Total
1	4	Kemi Francis-Petersen	Nigeria	24.74	911		3103
2	3	Odile Ahouanwanou	Benin	25.44	847		3534
3	6	Adèle Mafogang Tenkeu	Cameroon	25.67	826		2980
4	5	Shannon Verster	South Africa	26.38	764		3107
	2	Nada Charoudi	Tunisia	DNS	0		DNF

=== Long jump ===
Rank	Athlete	Nationality	#1	#2	#3	Result	Points	Notes	Total
1	Odile Ahouanwanou	Benin	5.70w	5.48	–	5.70w	759		4293
2	Adèle Mafogang Tenkeu	Cameroon	5.67	5.56	5.66	5.67	750		3730
3	Kemi Francis-Petersen	Nigeria	5.63	5.42w	5.55	5.63	738		3841
4	Shannon Verster	South Africa	5.29	5.20	5.22w	5.29	640		3747

=== Javelin throw ===
Rank	Athlete	Nationality	#1	#2	#3	Result	Points	Notes	Total
1	Odile Ahouanwanou	Benin	40.29	x	39.48	40.29	673		4966
2	Kemi Francis-Petersen	Nigeria	36.29	39.40	x	39.40	656		4497
3	Adèle Mafogang Tenkeu	Cameroon	34.53	33.87	36.33	36.33	597		4327
4	Shannon Verster	South Africa	30.12	x	33.10	33.10	535		4282

=== 800 metres ===
Rank	Name	Nationality	Time	Points	Notes
1	Adèle Mafogang Tenkeu	Cameroon	2:17.76	854	
2	Shannon Verster	South Africa	2:21.60	802	
3	Kemi Francis-Petersen	Nigeria	2:23.89	771	
4	Odile Ahouanwanou	Benin	2:33.48	650	

=== Final standings ===
The highest mark recorded in each event is highlighted in yellow

Rank	Athlete	Nationality	100m H	HJ	SP	200m	LJ	JT	800m	Points	Notes
1st place, gold medalist(s)	Odile Ahouanwanou	Benin	14.18	1.79	13.61	25.44	5.70	40.29	2:33.48	5616	
2nd place, silver medalist(s)	Kemi Francis-Petersen	Nigeria	14.49	1.64	9.53	24.74	5.63	39.40	2:23.89	5268	
3rd place, bronze medalist(s)	Adèle Mafogang Tenkeu	Cameroon	15.45	1.67	10.36	25.67	5.67	36.33	2:17.76	5181	
4	Shannon Verster	South Africa	14.59	1.70	10.94	26.38	5.29	33.10	2:21.60	5084	
	Nada Charoudi	Tunisia	21.17	1.61	13.46	DNS	–	–	–	DNF	
