= Prestina Ochonogor =

Nigerian long jumper (born 2006)

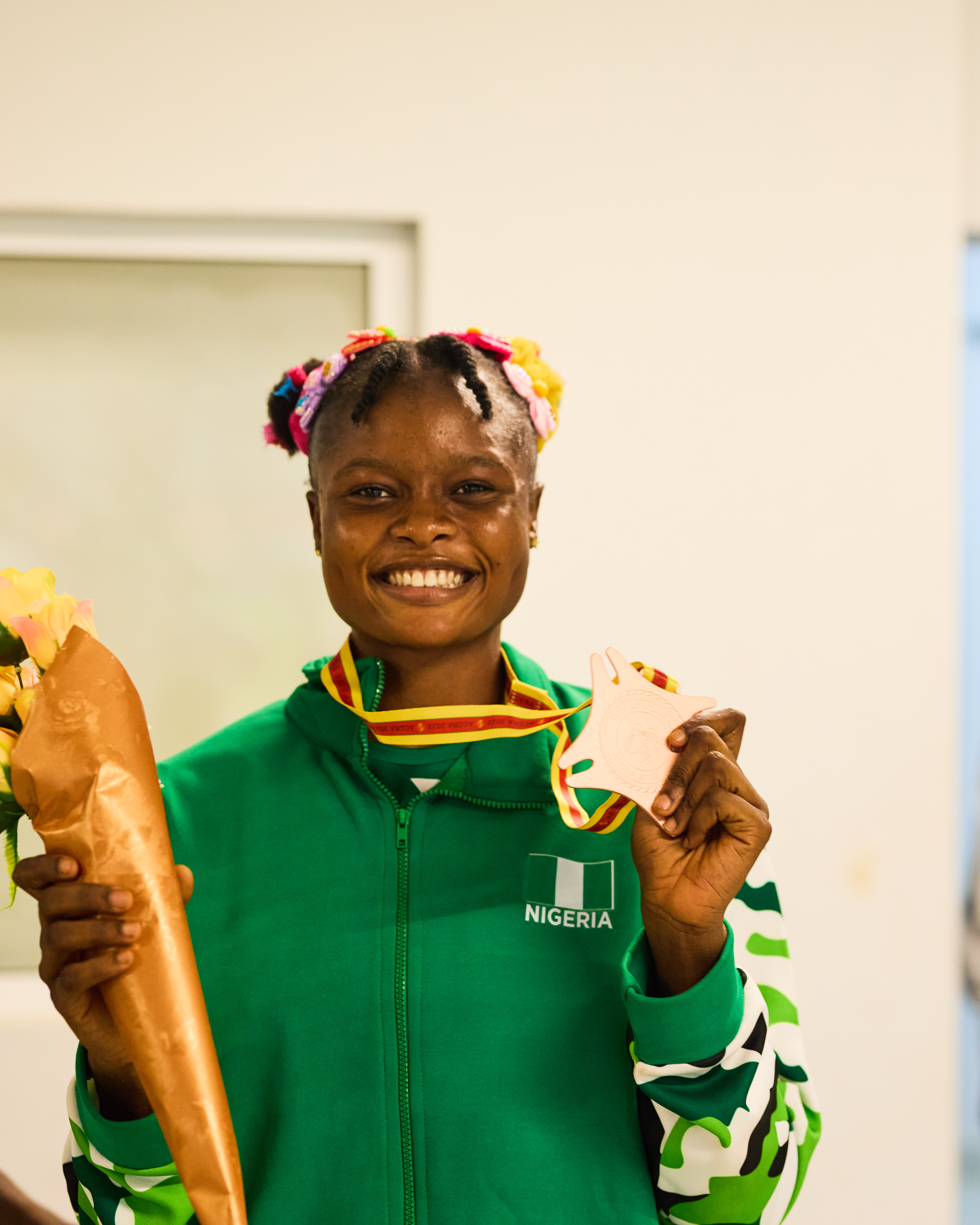

Personal information
- Nationality: Nigerian
- Born: Prestina Oluchi Ochonogor; 3 July 2006 (age 20)

Sport
- Sport: Athletics
- Event: Long jump

Achievements and titles
- Personal bests: Long jump: 6.79m (Calabar, 2024)
Medal record
Women's athletics
Representing Nigeria
2023 African Games
Bronze medal – third place	2023 Accra	Long jump
African U20 Championships
Gold medal – first place	2025 Abeokuta	Long jump
African U18 Championships
Silver medal – second place	2023 Ndola	Long jump

Prestina Oluchi Ochonogor (born 3 July 2006) is a Nigerian track and field athlete who competes in the long jump.

== Biography ==
Ochonogor was a silver medalist in the long jump at the 2023 African U18 Championships in Ndola, Zambia. She was a bronze medalist aged 17 years-old in the long jump at the 2023 African Games in Accra, with a personal best 6.67 metres.

Ochonogor won the CAA Region 2 Championship in Accra in June 2024. Later that month, she became Nigerian national champion in the long jump, jumping 6.75 metres in Benin City. She competed in the long jump at the 2024 Paris Olympics, where she placed twelfth overall.

Ochonogor was selected for the 2025 World Athletics Indoor Championships in Nanjing in March 2025. In July 2025, she won the gold medal with a championship record 6.71m to break the previous best held by her compatriot Ese Brume at the African U20 Championships. In September 2025, she competed at the 2025 World Championships in Tokyo, Japan.

Ochonogor won the long jump at the 2026 Western Athletic Conference Indoor Track and Field Championships in Spokane, also placing third in the 60 metres at the Championships, finishing behind Victoria Cameron and ahead of Lauren Roy in a Tarleton-sweep of the podium, to help Tarleton win the women's team competition for the first time. She qualified for the long jump at the 2026 NCAA Division I Indoor Track and Field Championships, placing fifth overall. That summer, she also qualified for the 2026 NCAA Outdoor Championships. She competed for Nigeria at the 2026 Commonwealth Games. Later at the Games, she also competed in the women's 4 × 100 m relay.
