= Marthe Koala =

Burkinabé athlete (born 1994)

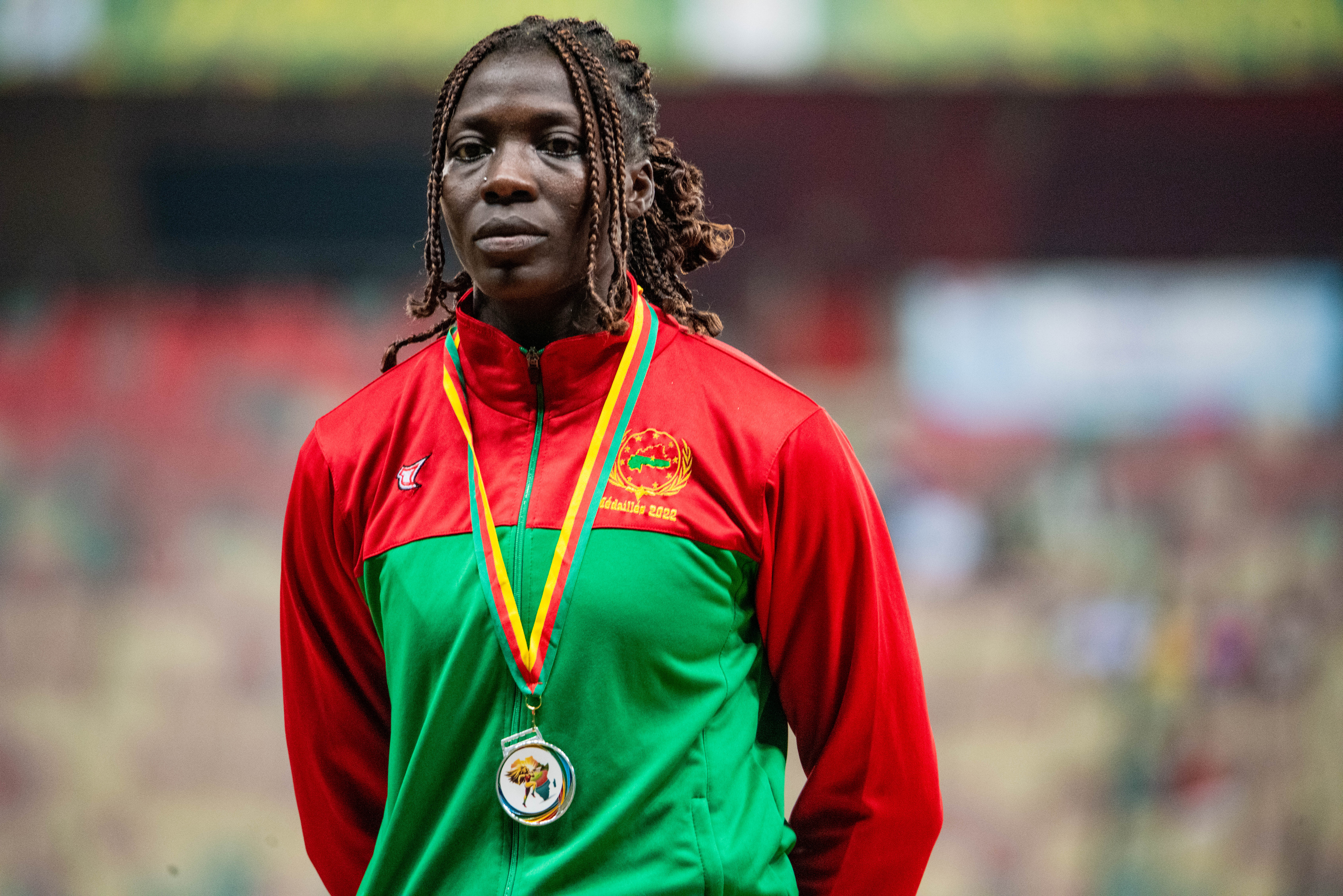
- Koala at the 2024 African Championships

Personal information
- Full name: Marthe Christiane Yasmine Koala
- Born: 8 March 1994 (age 32) Bobo-Dioulasso, Burkina Faso
- Education: University of Malta
- Height: 1.77 m (5 ft 10 in)
- Weight: 69 kg (152 lb)

Sport
- Country: Burkina Faso
- Sport: Athletics
- Event: Heptathlon
- Coached by: Teddy Tamgho
Medal record
Women's athletics
Representing Burkina Faso
African Games
Gold medal – first place	2019 Rabat	Heptathlon
Silver medal – second place	2019 Rabat	100 m hurdles
Silver medal – second place	2023 Accra	Long jump
Bronze medal – third place	2015 Brazzaville	Heptathlon
African Championships
Gold medal – first place	2014 Marrakesh	Heptathlon
Gold medal – first place	2022 Saint Pierre	Long jump
Silver medal – second place	2016 Durban	100 m hurdles
Silver medal – second place	2016 Durban	Heptathlon
Silver medal – second place	2018 Asaba	Long jump
Silver medal – second place	2018 Asaba	Heptathlon
Silver medal – second place	2024 Douala	Long jump
Silver medal – second place	2026 Accra	Long jump
- Updated on 25 August 2023

Marthe Koala (born 8 March 1994) is a Burkinabe athlete competing in the 100 metres hurdles, long jump and heptathlon. At the 2012 and the 2020 Summer Olympics, she competed in the women's 100 metres hurdles. She also competed in the women's heptathlon at the 2020 Summer Olympics, but was injured during the shot put and was unable to participate in the remaining four events. At the 2023 World Athletics Championships she competed in the long jump and ended in 7th place.

== Competition record ==
Year	Competition	Venue	Position	Event	Notes
Representing Burkina Faso
2011	World Youth Championships	Lille, France	37th (h)	200 m	25.80 s
2011	All-Africa Games	Maputo, Mozambique	5th	Heptathlon	5133 pts
2012	World Junior Championships	Barcelona, Spain	34th (h)	100 m hurdles	14.15 s
2012	Olympic Games	London, United Kingdom	33rd (h)	100 m hurdles	13.91 s
2013	African Junior Championships	Bambous, Mauritius	1st	100 m hurdles	14.09 s
2013	African Junior Championships	Bambous, Mauritius	3rd	Long jump	5.60 m (w)
2013	Jeux de la Francophonie	Nice, France	7th	100 m hurdles	13.75 s
2014	African Championships	Marrakesh, Morocco	1st	Heptathlon	5454 pts
2015	World Championships	Beijing, China	–	Heptathlon	DNF
2015	African Games	Brazzaville, Republic of the Congo	3rd	Heptathlon	5664 pts
2016	African Championships	Durban, South Africa	2nd	100 m hurdles	13.36 s
2016	African Championships	Durban, South Africa	2nd	Heptathlon	5952 pts
2016	Olympic Games	Rio de Janeiro, Brazil	43rd (h)	100 m hurdles	13.41 s
2017	Jeux de la Francophonie	Abidjan, Ivory Coast	1st	100 m hurdles	13.32 s
2017	Jeux de la Francophonie	Abidjan, Ivory Coast	1st	Long jump	6.52 m
2017	World Championships	London, United Kingdom	35th (h)	100 m hurdles	13.38 s
2018	African Championships	Asaba, Nigeria	2nd	Long jump	6.54 m (w)
2018	African Championships	Asaba, Nigeria	2nd	Heptathlon	5967 pts
2019	Universiade	Naples, Italy	9th	Long jump	6.25 m
2019	Universiade	Naples, Italy	3rd	Heptathlon	6121 pts
2019	African Games	Rabat, Morocco	2nd	100 m hurdles	13.20 s
2019	African Games	Rabat, Morocco	1st	Heptathlon	5866 pts
2019	World Championships	Doha, Qatar	–	Heptathlon	DNF
2021	Olympic Games	Tokyo, Japan	30th (h)	100 m hurdles	13.11 s
2021	Olympic Games	Tokyo, Japan	–	Heptathlon	DNF
2022	African Championships	Port Louis, Mauritius	4th	100 m hurdles	12.99 s (w)
2022	African Championships	Port Louis, Mauritius	1st	Long jump	6.42 m
2022	Islamic Solidarity Games	Konya, Turkey	1st	Long jump	6.53 m (w)
2023	Jeux de la Francophonie	Kinshasa, DR Congo	–	100 m hurdles	DQ
2023	Jeux de la Francophonie	Kinshasa, DR Congo	1st	Long jump	6.94 m
2023	World Championships	Budapest, Hungary	7th	Long jump	6.68 m
2024	African Games	Accra, Ghana	7th (h)	4 × 100 m relay	46.40
2024	African Games	Accra, Ghana	2nd	Long jump	6.81 m (w)
2024	African Championships	Douala, Cameroon	2nd	Long jump	6.72 m
2024	Olympic Games	Paris, France	9th	Long jump	6.61 m
2025	World Championships	Tokyo, Japan	10th	Long jump	6.49 m
2026	African Championships	Accra, Ghana	2nd	Long jump	6.75 m w
2026	World Ultimate Championship	Budapest, Hungary	8th	Long jump	6.21 m

Olympic Games
Preceded by Hugues Fabrice Zango; Angelika Ouedraogo	Flagbearer for Burkina Faso; Paris 2024 with Hugues Fabrice Zango	Succeeded by Incumbent
