= Uhunoma Osazuwa =

Nigerian athlete

Personal information
- Born: November 23, 1987 (age 38) Oakland, California, United States
- Education: Clark High School; Syracuse University; University of Michigan
- Height: 5 ft 9 in (1.75 m)

Sport
- Country: Nigeria
- Sport: Athletics
- Event: Heptathlon
- College team: Syracuse Orange
- Turned pro: 2010
- Coached by: Enoch Borozinski

Achievements and titles
- Olympic finals: 2012, 2016
- World finals: 2015
- Personal best: 6153 (Durban, South Africa)
Medal record
Women's thletics
Representing Nigeria
African Games
| Gold medal – first place | 2015 Brazzaville | Heptathlon |
| Silver medal – second place | 2011 Maputo | High jump |
African Championships
| Gold medal – first place | 2016 Durban | Heptathlon |
| Bronze medal – third place | 2012 Porto-Novo | 100 m hurdles |
- Updated on 26 August 2016

Uhunoma Naomi-Pauline Osazuwa (born November 23, 1987) is a Nigerian track and field athlete competing in the heptathlon. She represented Nigeria at the 2012 Summer Olympics but failed to finish the competition after recording marks in five events. She qualified for 2016 Rio Olympics in the heptathlon, finishing in 29th place.

She received her doctor of pharmacy degree in 2014 from the University of Michigan College of Pharmacy.

== Competition record ==
| Year | Competition | Venue | Position | Event | Notes |
Representing Nigeria
| 2011 | All-Africa Games | Maputo, Mozambique | 2nd | High jump | 1.80 m |
| 2011 | Universiade | Shenzhen, China | 11th | Heptathlon | 5589 pts |
| 2012 | African Championships | Porto-Novo, Benin | 3rd | 100 m hurdles | 13.61 s |
| 2012 | African Championships | Porto-Novo, Benin | 5th | Heptathlon | 5126 pts |
| 2012 | Olympic Games | London, United Kingdom | – | Heptathlon | DNF |
| 2015 | Pan American Combined Events Cup | Ottawa, Canada | 2nd | Heptathlon | 6008 pts |
| 2015 | World Championships | Beijing, China | 18th | Heptathlon | 5951 pts |
| 2015 | African Games | Brazzaville, Republic of the Congo | 1st | Heptathlon | 5892 pts |
| 2016 | African Championships | Durban, South Africa | 1st | Heptathlon | 6153 pts |
| 2016 | Olympic Games | Rio de Janeiro, Brazil | 29th | Heptathlon | 4916 pts |

== NCAA record ==
| Year | Competition | Venue | Position | Event | Notes |
Representing Syracuse Orange
| 2010 | 2010 NCAA Division I Outdoor Track and Field Championships | Hayward Field; University of Oregon | 14th | Heptathlon | 5304 pts |
| 2010 | Big East Conference Outdoor Track and Field Championships | Gettler Stadium; University Of Cincinnati Bearcats | 1st | Heptathlon | 5549 pts |
| 2010 | NCAA Women's Division I Indoor Track and Field Championships | Randal Tyson Track Center; University of Arkansas | 6th | Pentathlon | 4061 pts |
| 2010 | Big East Conference Indoor Track and Field Championships | Armory Track & Field Center | 2nd | Pentathlon | 3942 pts |
| 2009 | Big East Conference Outdoor Track and Field Championships | Villanova Stadium; Villanova University | 1st | Heptathlon | 5236 pts |
| 2009 | Big East Conference Indoor Track and Field Championships | Armory Track & Field Center | 4th | Pentathlon | 3836 pts |
| 2008 | Big East Conference Outdoor Track and Field Championships | Villanova Stadium; Villanova University | 5th | Heptathlon | 4921 pts |
| 2008 | Big East Conference Indoor Track and Field Championships | Armory Track & Field Center | 4th | Pentathlon | 3757 pts |
| 2007 | Big East Conference Outdoor Track and Field Championships | George J. Sherman Family-Sports Complex; University of Connecticut | 8th | Heptathlon | 4775 pts |
| 2007 | Big East Conference Indoor Track and Field Championships | Armory Track & Field Center | | Pentathlon | 3423 pts |
| 2007 | Big East Conference Indoor Track and Field Championships | Armory Track & Field Center | | 60 m hurdles | 9.07 |
