= Esraa Owis =

Egyptian athletics competitor (born 1977)

Personal information
- Full name: Esraa Muhammed Samir Owis
- Nationality: Egypt
- Born: 15 October 1997 (age 28)

Sport
- Sport: Track and Field
- Events: Long Jump, Triple Jump

Achievements and titles
- Personal best: Long jump: 6.75m (2022) Triple jump: 13.57 NR (2023)
Medal record
Long jump
Representing Egypt
African Championships
Bronze medal – third place	2022 Mauritius	Long jump
Mediterranean Games
Silver medal – second place	2022 Algeria	Long jump
Arab Games
Gold medal – first place	2023 Algeria	Long jump
Gold medal – first place	2023 Algeria	Triple jump

Esraa Muhammed Samir Owis (Arabic: اسراء محمد سمير•عويس; born 15 October 1997) is an Egyptian track and field athlete who competes in the long jump and triple jump. In 2022, she became the first woman from Egypt to win a silver medal in the long jump at the Mediterranean Games. She won two gold medals in the women's long jump and the triple jump in the 2023 Arab Games.

== Career ==
Owis won two medals at the 2015 African Junior Athletics Championships, a silver in the triple jump event and a bronze in the long jump event.

Following ankle surgery and nine months of rehab, Owis competed at the 2022 African Championships in Athletics, where she won bronze in the long jump. She became the first woman from Egypt to win a silver medal in the long jump at the Mediterranean Games in 2022.

In 2023, Owis won two gold medals at the Arab Games, in both the long and triple jumps. In 2024, she qualified for the Summer Olympics in Paris for the long jump. She jumped to 6.2 m in Paris, placing 15th in the first group.

Owis holds personal bests of 6.75 m in the long jump. Her best of 13.57 m in the triple jump set at the 2023 Arab Games is an Egyptian national record.
