= Danielle Nolte =

South African athlete (born 2002)

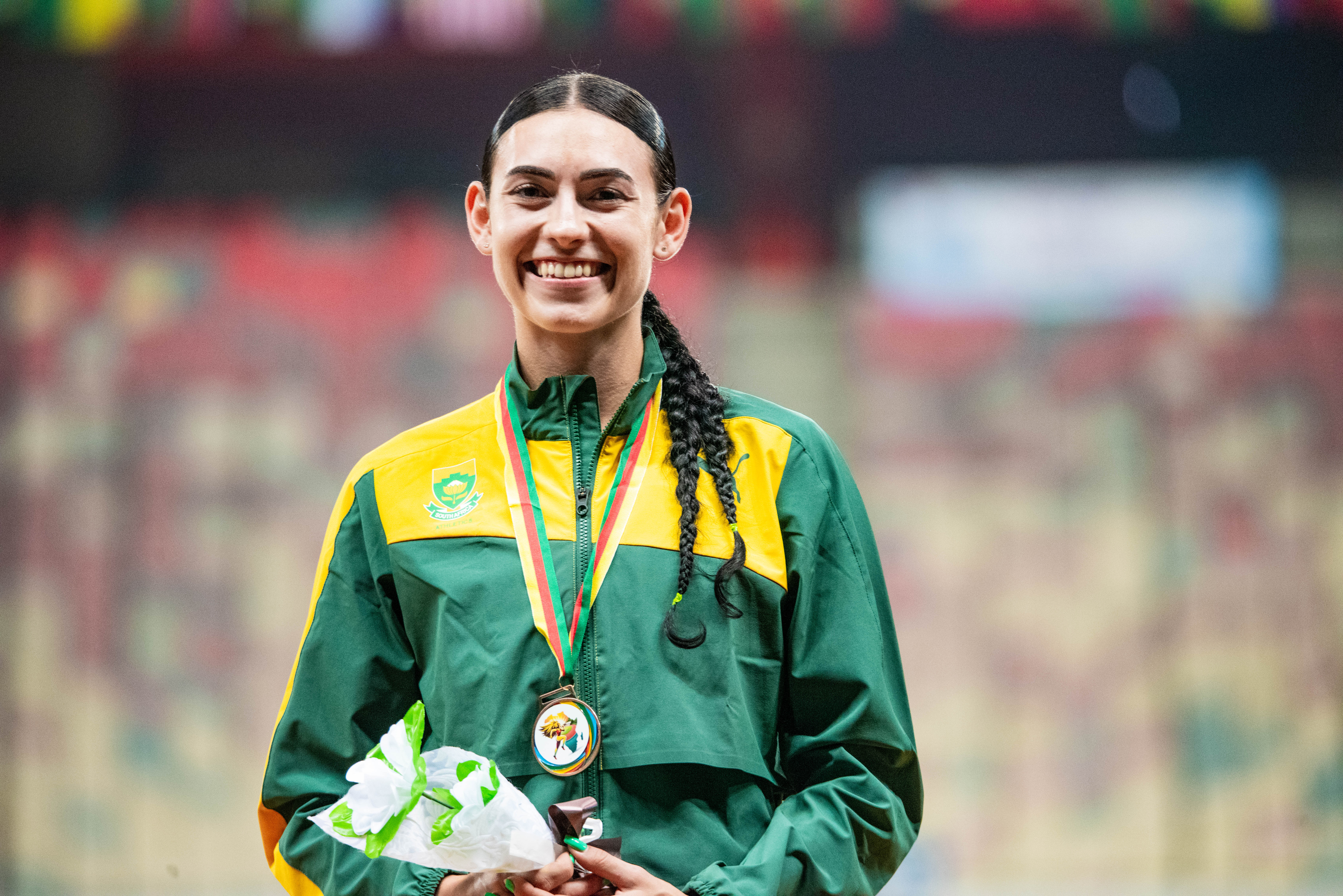
- Nolte in 2024

Personal information
- Nationality: South African
- Born: 11 January 2002 (age 24)

Sport
- Sport: Athletics
- Event: Long Jump

Achievements and titles
- Personal best: Long jump: 6.61m (2024)
Medal record
Women's athletics
Representing South Africa
African Championships
Bronze medal – third place	2024 Douala	Long jump

Danielle Nolte (born 11 January 2002) is a South African long jumper. She is a multiple-time national champion since 2022, and was the bronze medalist in the long jump at the 2024 African Championships.

== Biography ==
Nolte attended TuksSport High School in Pretoria. In 2019, she competed at the South Africa Junior Championships where she won a silver medal in the under-18 triple jump competition. She ended the season with the best distance in the long jump, of 5.80 metres.

Nolte is a member of Athletics Gauteng North (AGN). She won the senior South African Athletics Championships for the first time in April 2022 with a jump of 6.22 metres in Cape Town. She placed sixth at the 2022 African Championships in Saint Pierre, Mauritius, with a long jump of 6.09 metres.

Nolte was South African Athletics Championships long jump champion for the again in April 2023 with a jump of 6.31 metres. She jumped a personal best 6.61 metres to win the South African Championships title in April 2024 in Pietermaritzburg. She won the bronze medal in the long jump at the 2024 African Championships in Douala, Cameroon in June 2024, behind Ese Brume and Marthe Koala.

Nolte jumped 6.56 metres to win the second leg of the ASA Grand Prix Series in Johannesburg, on 19 March 2025. She retained her South African Championships title in April 2025 in Potchefstroom. She jumped 6.56 metres in competition again at the Kip Keino Classic in May 2025.

In September 2025, she competed at the 2025 World Championships in Tokyo, Japan.

In April 2026, she won the long jump title at the South African Championships in Stellenbosch.
