= 2024 African Championships in Athletics – Women's 100 metres hurdles =

Women's 100 metres hurdles at the 2024 African Championships in Athletics
- Venue: Japoma Stadium
- Location: Douala, Cameroon
- Dates: 21 June (heats); 22 June (final)
- Competitors: 14 from 11 nations
- Winning time: 12.70 CR, NR

Medalists
gold medal	Ebony Morrison	Liberia
silver medal	Marione Fourie	South Africa
bronze medal	Sidonie Fiadanantsoa	Madagascar

The women's 100 metres hurdles event at the 2024 African Championships in Athletics was held on 21 and 22 June in Douala, Cameroon.

== Records ==
Records before the 2024 African Athletics Championships
Record	Athlete (nation)	Time (s)	Location	Date
World record	Tobi Amusan (NGR)	12.12	Eugene, United States	24 July 2022
African record	Tobi Amusan (NGR)	12.12	Eugene, United States	24 July 2022
Championship record	Glory Alozie (NGR)	12.77	Dakar, Senegal	19 August 1998
World leading	Cyréna Samba-Mayela (FRA)	12.31	Rome, Italy	8 June 2024
African leading	Tobi Amusan (NGR)	12.40	Kingston, Jamaica	11 May 2024

== Results ==
=== Heats ===
Qualification: First 3 of each heat (Q) and the next 2 fastest (q) qualified for the final.

Wind:
Heat 1: +2.1 m/s, Heat 2: +0.1 m/s

Rank	Heat	Name	Nationality	Time	Notes
1	1	Marione Fourie	South Africa	13.03	Q
2	2	Ebony Morrison	Liberia	13.05	Q
3	2	Sidonie Fiadanantsoa	Madagascar	13.24	Q
4	2	Evonne Britton	Ghana	13.30	Q
5	2	Adaobi Tabugbo	Nigeria	13.46	q
6	1	Safiatou Acquaviva	Guinea	13.60	Q
7	1	Doris Quainoo Mensah	Ghana	13.63	Q
8	1	Nusra Rukia	Kenya	13.96	q
9	2	Cecilia Guambe	Mozambique	14.09	
10	2	Naomi Akakpo	Togo	14.39	
11	1	Madina Touré	Burkina Faso	14.52	
12	2	Tigist Ayana	Ethiopia	15.05	
13	1	Emebet Teketel	Ethiopia	15.45	
14	2	Meskerem Lewa	Ethiopia	15.57	
	1	Tobi Amusan	Nigeria	DNS	
	1	Carolina Yonengue	Angola	DNS	

=== Final ===
Wind: +1.1 m/s

Rank	Lane	Athlete	Nationality	Time	Notes
1st place, gold medalist(s)	5	Ebony Morrison	Liberia	12.70	CR, NR
2nd place, silver medalist(s)	4	Marione Fourie	South Africa	12.74	
3rd place, bronze medalist(s)	6	Sidonie Fiadanantsoa	Madagascar	12.98	
4	8	Evonne Britton	Ghana	13.08	
5	1	Adaobi Tabugbo	Nigeria	13.47	
6	3	Doris Quainoo Mensah	Ghana	13.65	
7	7	Safiatou Acquaviva	Guinea	13.66	
8	2	Nusra Rukia	Kenya	13.99	

== See also ==
- Athletics at the 2023 African Games – Women's 100 metres hurdles
