= 2022 World Athletics Championships – Women's 100 metres hurdles =

Women's 100 metres hurdles at the 2022 World Championships
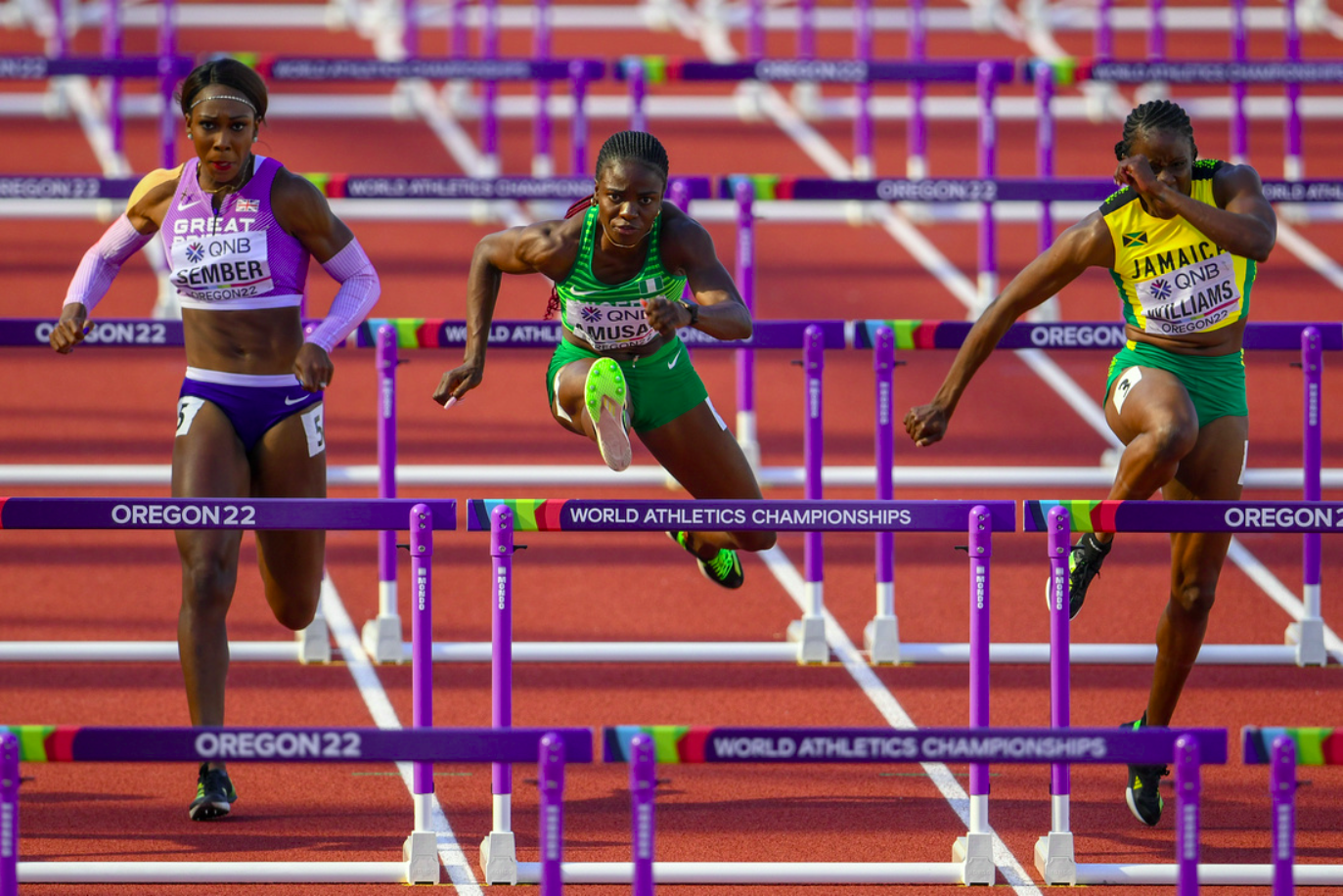
- Tobi Amusan competing against Cindy Sember and Danielle Williams in the semi-final, where she broke the world record.
- Venue: Hayward Field
- Dates: 23 July (heats); 24 July (semi-finals & final)
- Competitors: 43 from 28 nations
- Winning time: 12.06

Medalists
gold medal	Tobi Amusan	Nigeria
silver medal	Britany Anderson	Jamaica
bronze medal	Jasmine Camacho-Quinn	Puerto Rico

The women's 100 metres hurdles at the 2022 World Athletics Championships was held at the Hayward Field in Eugene on 23 and 24 July 2022. It was won by Tobi Amusan. Amusan set a world record of 12.12 seconds in the semi-final. She ran 12.06 to win the final, but that was not a world record because it was wind assisted.

== Summary ==
This was a dramatic event from the first heat to the final. In heat 1, defending champion Nia Ali was out in front early, with three to automatically qualify, Britany Anderson come up to challenge her over the last few hurdles. Ali clipped the ninth hurdle, started to lose her balance at full speed. She tried valiantly to jump over the final hurdle, but her lead leg never could get high enough, instead hooking the hurdle in the lane next to her, belonging to Anne Zagré. Ali was down on the track as the entire field ran past her.

After the disqualification, notably of Devon Allen earlier in the week, athletes commented on how they were being extra careful about their starting technique. Olympic Champion Jasmine Camacho-Quinn and world record holder Kendra Harrison had to battle back from slow starts to win their heats. Tobi Amusan took a hundredth off her African Record to be the fastest qualifier. In heat 4, Alaysha Johnson missed her step to the first hurdle, then pushed the second hurdle over to be disqualified. On the sixth hurdle Liz Clay tripped and rolled into the seventh hurdle. And after a protest, a seventh heat was created by disqualifying Ali for interfering with another athlete's hurdle, to allow Zagré a solo attempt to make a qualifying time. In that special heat, Zagré fell over the tenth hurdle and failed.

The first semi final saw Amusan make another improvement. With Harrison two lanes to her right, Amusan was out fast and kept pulling away. After crossing the line she looked up at the scoreboard, first happiness at winning the race, then surprise, then joy. Her time was 12.12, a new world record and the wind was legal +0.9. This distance was first introduced to major championship level in the 1972 Olympics. During the 1970's, when drug testing was less sophisticated and automatic timing was not required (until 1977), Grażyna Rabsztyn and other primarily Soviet bloc athletes took the world record from the first auto timed 12.48 down to 12.36 by 1980. Between 1986 and 1988, two Bulgarian athletes Ginka Zagorcheva and Yordanka Donkova inched the record down from 12.29 to Donkova's 12.21 which remained unchanged for almost 28 years until Harrison took 1/100 off. That too stood for another 6 years. In one day, Amusan improved the world record by 8 times the progress of 36 years and her personal best by almost a third of a second.

And the semi-finals were not over. Anderson ran 12.31 for a new national record and the #9 individual in history. Three others also set their national records and the entire top 16 set seasons bests, most of them personal bests. And the final was less than 2 hours later.

Amusan got out well in the final, but Anderson was next to her running the exact same cadence, with Alia Armstrong and Harrison inches behind. By the fourth hurdle, Amusan began to edge ahead while Harrison was going the other direction. Danielle Williams was gaining on Anderson. Within two hurdles, Amusan had daylight in front, Anderson, Armstrong, Williams and now Camacho-Quinn were dead even. Harrison hit the seventh hurdle, pushing over the eighth to be disqualified, Anderson and Camacho-Quinn separated from the lineup and Amusan was a metre and a half clear. They closed in on the line, Amusan raised her hands in victory after crossing the line, Anderson and Camacho-Quinn in a photo finish. Look at the time, 12.06 but no, the wind reading was +2.5 MPS, over the allowable so there would be no new world record. It was just the fastest time ever run. From the photo, Anderson was given silver by .005.

== Records ==
Before the competition records were as follows:

Record	Athlete & Nat.	Perf.	Location	Date
World record	Kendra Harrison (USA)	12.20	London, Great Britain	22 July 2016
Championship record	Sally Pearson (AUS)	12.28	Daegu, South Korea	3 September 2011
World Leading	Kendra Harrison (USA)	12.34	Eugene, United States	25 June 2022
African Record	Tobi Amusan (NGR)	12.41	Paris, France	18 June 2022
Asian Record	Olga Shishigina (KAZ)	12.44	Luzern, Switzerland	27 June 1995
North, Central American and Caribbean record	Kendra Harrison (USA)	12.20	London, Great Britain	22 July 2016
South American Record	Maurren Higa Maggi (BRA)	12.71	Manaus, Brazil	19 May 2001
European Record	Yordanka Donkova (BUL)	12.21	Stara Zagora, Bulgaria	20 August 1988
Oceanian record	Sally Pearson (AUS)	12.28	Daegu, South Korea	3 September 2011

== Qualification standard ==
The standard to qualify automatically for entry was 12.84.

== Schedule ==
The event schedule, in local time (UTC−7), was as follows:

Date	Time	Round
23 July	11:20	Heats
24 July	17:05	Semi-finals
24 July	19:00	Final

== Results ==
=== Heats ===
The first 3 athletes in each heat (Q) and the next 6 fastest (q) qualify to the semi-finals..

Wind:
Heat 1: -0.3 m/s, Heat 2: -0.4 m/s, Heat 3: +1.5 m/s, Heat 4: +0.7 m/s, Heat 5: +0.5 m/s, Heat 6: -0.4 m/s, Heat 7: -0.1 m/s

Rank	Heat	Name	Nationality	Time	Notes
1	3	Tobi Amusan	Nigeria	12.40	Q, AR
2	5	Alia Armstrong	United States	12.48	Q
3	2	Jasmine Camacho-Quinn	Puerto Rico	12.52	Q
4	1	Britany Anderson	Jamaica	12.59	Q
5	6	Kendra Harrison	United States	12.60	Q
6	6	Cindy Sember	Great Britain & N.I.	12.67	Q
7	2	Devynne Charlton	Bahamas	12.69	Q
8	4	Pia Skrzyszowska	Poland	12.70	Q
9	5	Megan Tapper	Jamaica	12.73	Q
10	4	Nadine Visser	Netherlands	12.76	Q
11	6	Michelle Jenneke	Australia	12.84	Q, SB
12	3	Danielle Williams	Jamaica	12.87	Q
13	5	Marione Fourie	South Africa	12.94	Q
14	1	Michelle Harrison	Canada	12.95	Q
15	5	Mako Fukube	Japan	12.96	q
16	3	Sarah Lavin	Ireland	12.99	Q
17	2	Noemi Zbären	Switzerland	13.00	Q
18	3	Celeste Mucci	Australia	13.01	q
19	5	Laëticia Bapté	France	13.03	q
20	1	Mette Graversgaard	Denmark	13.04	Q
21	6	Reetta Hurske	Finland	13.09	q
22	6	Masumi Aoki	Japan	13.12	q
23	3	Ditaji Kambundji	Switzerland	13.12	q
24	6	Yoveinny Mota	Venezuela	13.12	
25	3	Ebony Morrison	Liberia	13.12	
26	4	Andrea Vargas	Costa Rica	13.12	Q
27	4	Paola Vazquez	Puerto Rico	13.13	
28	2	Cyréna Samba-Mayela	France	13.15	
29	6	Elisa Di Lazzaro	Italy	13.16	
30	1	Greisys Roble	Cuba	13.24	
31	2	Klaudia Siciarz	Poland	13.27	
32	4	Helena Jiranová	Czech Republic	13.37	
33	2	Zoë Sedney	Netherlands	13.38	
34	3	Sidonie Fiadanantsoa	Madagascar	13.57	
35	1	Naomi Akakpo	Togo	13.64	
36	7	Anne Zagré	Belgium	14.05	
37	2	Ketiley Batista	Brazil	14.22	
	5	Mulern Jean	Haiti		DNF
	1	Nia Ali	United States		DQ
	4	Liz Clay	Australia		DQ
	4	Alaysha Johnson	United States		DQ

=== Semi-finals ===
The first 2 athletes in each heat (Q) and the next 2 fastest (q) qualified to the final.

Wind:
Heat 1: +0.9 m/s, Heat 2: -0.1 m/s, Heat 3: +0.3 m/s

Rank	Heat	Name	Nationality	Time	Notes
1	1	Tobi Amusan	Nigeria	12.12	Q, WR
2	1	Kendra Harrison	United States	12.27	Q, SB
3	3	Britany Anderson	Jamaica	12.31	Q, NR
4	3	Jasmine Camacho-Quinn	Puerto Rico	12.32	Q, SB
5	1	Danielle Williams	Jamaica	12.41	q, SB
6	2	Alia Armstrong	United States	12.43	Q, PB
7	2	Devynne Charlton	Bahamas	12.46	Q, NR
8	1	Cindy Sember	Great Britain & N.I.	12.50	q, NR
9	2	Megan Tapper	Jamaica	12.52	PB
10	2	Pia Skrzyszowska	Poland	12.62	=PB
11	1	Michelle Jenneke	Australia	12.66 (.656)	PB
12	3	Nadine Visser	Netherlands	12.66 (.659)	SB
13	1	Ditaji Kambundji	Switzerland	12.70	PB
14	3	Michelle Harrison	Canada	12.74	PB
15	1	Andrea Vargas	Costa Rica	12.82 (.812)	SB
16	1	Mako Fukube	Japan	12.82 (.820)	NR
17	3	Sarah Lavin	Ireland	12.87	
18	3	Laëticia Bapté	France	12.93 (.926)	
19	2	Marione Fourie	South Africa	12.93 (.927)	=PB
20	3	Noemi Zbären	Switzerland	12.94	SB
21	2	Masumi Aoki	Japan	13.04	
22	2	Mette Graversgaard	Denmark	13.05	
23	3	Reetta Hurske	Finland	13.15	
24	2	Celeste Mucci	Australia		DQ

=== Final ===
The final was started on 24 July at 19:01. The wind speed of +2.5 m/s was outside of the allowable range for the world record.

Rank	Name	Nationality	Time	Notes
1st place, gold medalist(s)	Tobi Amusan	Nigeria	12.06	w
2nd place, silver medalist(s)	Britany Anderson	Jamaica	12.23	.224
3rd place, bronze medalist(s)	Jasmine Camacho-Quinn	Puerto Rico	12.23	.229
4	Alia Armstrong	United States	12.31	
5	Cindy Sember	Great Britain & N.I.	12.38	
6	Danielle Williams	Jamaica	12.44	
7	Devynne Charlton	Bahamas	12.53	
	Kendra Harrison	United States		DQ
