= 2023 World Athletics Championships – Women's 100 metres hurdles =

Women's 100 metres hurdles at the 2023 World Championships
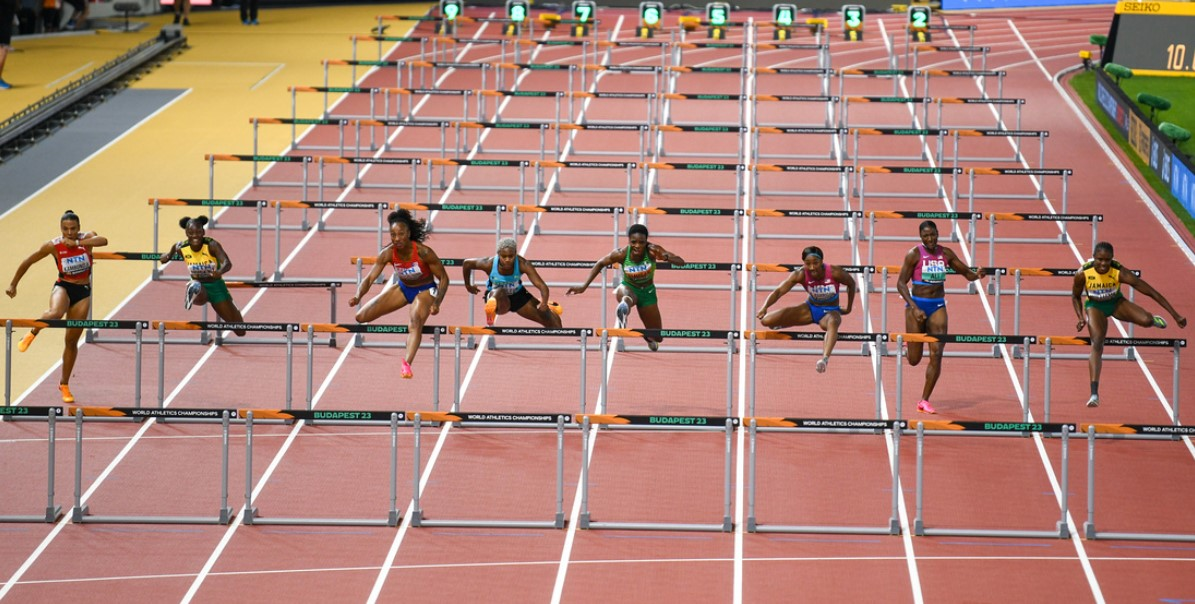
- The final of the event
- Venue: National Athletics Centre
- Dates: 22 August (heats); 23 August (semi-final); 24 August (final)
- Competitors: 43 from 26 nations
- Winning time: 12.43

Medalists
gold medal	Danielle Williams	Jamaica
silver medal	Jasmine Camacho-Quinn	Puerto Rico
bronze medal	Kendra Harrison	United States

The women's 100 metres hurdles at the 2023 World Athletics Championships was held at the National Athletics Centre in Budapest from 22 to 24 August 2023.

== Summary ==
In the first round, former world record holder Kendra Harrison ran 12.24, equalling her own #4 performance in history, leaving her with three of the top 5 races ever. Even her 12.33 in the semi-finals had only been beaten by ten women ever, but four of them made the finals along with her: Tobi Amusan, the defending champion who set the world record in the semi-final round at the previous championships; Jasmine Camacho-Quinn, Olympic Champion; Nia Ali, 2019 champion; and Danielle Williams, the 2015 champion. From that elite field, Devynne Charlton was the first one over the first hurdle. Charlton maintained that advantage as Camacho-Quinn and Harrison were trying to reel her in while Ali was hitting hurdles. Almost unnoticed in lane 2, Williams was getting up a head of steam, pulling even with Charlton by the fifth hurdle and taking a clear lead by the seventh. By the eighth, Harrison had gotten by Charlton and had separated to second. At the ninth, Camacho-Quinn got past Charlton and moving the fastest. Camacho-Quinn and Harrison cleared the last hurdle together, still marginally behind Williams. Camacho-Quinn closed quickly to make a photo finish with Williams, leaving Harrison with bronze. The photo gave it to Williams.

== Records ==
Before the competition records were as follows:

Record	Athlete & Nat.	Perf.	Location	Date
World record	Tobi Amusan (NGR)	12.12	Eugene, United States	24 July 2022
Championship record	Tobi Amusan (NGR)	12.12	Eugene, United States	24 July 2022
World Leading	Nia Ali (USA)	12.30	Fontvieille, Monaco	21 July 2023
African Record	Tobi Amusan (NGR)	12.12	Eugene, United States	24 July 2022
Asian Record	Olga Shishigina (KAZ)	12.44	Luzern, Switzerland	27 June 1995
North, Central American and Caribbean record	Kendra Harrison (USA)	12.20	London, United Kingdom	22 July 2016
South American Record	Maurren Higa Maggi (BRA)	12.71	Manaus, Brazil	19 May 2001
European Record	Yordanka Donkova (BUL)	12.21	Stara Zagora, Bulgaria	20 August 1988
Oceanian record	Sally Pearson (AUS)	12.28	Daegu, South Korea	3 September 2011

== Qualification standard ==
The standard to qualify automatically for entry was 12.78 seconds.

== Schedule ==
The event schedule, in local time (UTC+2), was as follows:

Date	Time	Round
22 August	18:40	Heats
23 August	20:45	Semi-finals
24 August	21:22	Final

== Results ==
=== Round 1 (heats) ===
Round 1 will take place on 22 August, with the 43 athletes involved being split into 5 heats of 9 athletes each. The first 4 athletes in each heat ( Q ) and the next 4 fastest ( q ) qualify for the semi-final. The overall results were as follows:

Wind:
Heat 1: +0.1 m/s, Heat 2: +0.1 m/s, Heat 3: +0.1 m/s, Heat 4: 0.0 m/s, Heat 5: +0.4 m/s

Rank	Heat	Name	Nationality	Time	Notes
1	3	Kendra Harrison	United States	12.24	Q, WL
2	3	Devynne Charlton	Bahamas	12.44	Q, NR
3	5	Tobi Amusan	Nigeria	12.48	Q
4	4	Jasmine Camacho-Quinn	Puerto Rico	12.50	Q
5	5	Megan Tapper	Jamaica	12.51	Q
6	3	Danielle Williams	Jamaica	12.51	Q, SB
7	2	Nia Ali	United States	12.55	Q
8	1	Ackera Nugent	Jamaica	12.60	Q
9	1	Masai Russell	United States	12.60	Q
10	2	Pia Skrzyszowska	Poland	12.65	Q
11	4	Nadine Visser	Netherlands	12.68	Q
12	1	Sarah Lavin	Ireland	12.69	Q
13	4	Ditaji Kambundji	Switzerland	12.71	Q
14	1	Cyréna Samba-Mayela	France	12.71	Q
15	2	Marione Fourie	South Africa	12.71	Q
15	2	Luca Kozák	Hungary	12.71	Q, SB
15	5	Michelle Jenneke	Australia	12.71	Q
18	3	Cindy Sember	Great Britain & N.I.	12.83	Q, SB
19	1	Mette Graversgaard	Denmark	12.87	q
20	1	Michelle Harrison	Canada	12.88	q
21	5	Natalia Christofi	Cyprus	12.90	Q
22	4	Celeste Mucci	Australia	12.90	Q
23	3	Reetta Hurske	Finland	12.92	q
24	5	Maayke Tjin A-Lim	Netherlands	12.92	q
25	4	Laëticia Bapté	France	12.93	
26	5	Ebony Morrison	Liberia	12.93	
27	3	Anna Tóth	Hungary	12.95	
28	4	Mariam Abdul-Rashid	Canada	13.04	
29	4	Jyothi Yarraji	India	13.05	
30	3	Taylon Bieldt	South Africa	13.05	
31	3	Hannah Jones	Australia	13.05	
32	1	Gréta Kerekes	Hungary	13.09	
33	2	Lotta Harala	Finland	13.11	
34	5	Yumi Tanaka	Japan	13.12	
35	5	Nika Glojnarič	Slovenia	13.13	
36	2	Asuka Terada	Japan	13.15	
37	2	Sidonie Fiadanantsoa	Madagascar	13.18	
38	4	Klaudia Siciarz	Poland	13.25	
39	1	Masumi Aoki	Japan	13.26	
40	2	Viktória Forster	Slovakia	13.47	
41	3	Dina Aulia	Indonesia	13.54	
42	2	Caroline de Melo Tomaz	Brazil	13.59	
43	4	Naomi Akakpo	Togo	13.96	

=== Semi-final ===
The semi-final took place on 23 August, with the 24 athletes involved being split into 3 heats. The first 2 athletes in each heat ( Q ) and the next 2 fastest ( q ) qualified for the final. The overall results were as follows:

Wind:
Heat 1: +0.5 m/s, Heat 2: -0.7 m/s, Heat 3: -0.4 m/s

Rank	Heat	Name	Nationality	Time	Notes
1	1	Kendra Harrison	United States	12.33	Q
2	3	Jasmine Camacho-Quinn	Puerto Rico	12.41	Q
3	1	Devynne Charlton	Bahamas	12.49	Q
4	3	Nia Ali	United States	12.49	Q
5	3	Danielle Williams	Jamaica	12.50	q, SB
6	1	Ditaji Kambundji	Switzerland	12.50	q
7	1	Megan Tapper	Jamaica	12.55	
8	2	Tobi Amusan	Nigeria	12.56	Q
9	2	Ackera Nugent	Jamaica	12.60	Q
10	2	Nadine Visser	Netherlands	12.62	SB
11	1	Sarah Lavin	Ireland	12.62	NR
12	3	Pia Skrzyszowska	Poland	12.71	
13	2	Luca Kozák	Hungary	12.73	
14	3	Michelle Jenneke	Australia	12.80	
15	3	Marione Fourie	South Africa	12.89	
16	3	Mette Graversgaard	Denmark	12.94	
17	2	Cyréna Samba-Mayela	France	12.95	
18	1	Cindy Sember	Great Britain & N.I.	12.97	
19	2	Celeste Mucci	Australia	12.97	
20	3	Michelle Harrison	Canada	13.05	
21	2	Reetta Hurske	Finland	13.05	
22	1	Maayke Tjin A-Lim	Netherlands	13.05	
23	1	Natalia Christofi	Cyprus	13.15	
	2	Masai Russell	United States	DNF	

=== Final ===
The final started at 21:22 on 24 August. The overall results were as follows:

Wind: -0.2 m/s

Rank	Lane	Name	Nationality	Time	Notes
1st place, gold medalist(s)	2	Danielle Williams	Jamaica	12.43	SB
2nd place, silver medalist(s)	7	Jasmine Camacho-Quinn	Puerto Rico	12.44	
3rd place, bronze medalist(s)	4	Kendra Harrison	United States	12.46	
4	6	Devynne Charlton	Bahamas	12.52	
5	8	Ackera Nugent	Jamaica	12.61	
6	5	Tobi Amusan	Nigeria	12.62	
7	9	Ditaji Kambundji	Switzerland	12.70	
8	3	Nia Ali	United States	12.78	
