= 2022 African Championships in Athletics – Women's 100 metres hurdles =

The women's 100 metres hurdles event at the 2022 African Championships in Athletics was held on 8 and 9 June in Port Louis, Mauritius.

== Medalists ==
Gold	Silver	Bronze
Tobi Amusan; Nigeria	Ebony Morrison; Liberia	Marione Fourie; South Africa

== Results ==
=== Heats ===
Qualification: First 3 of each heat (Q) and the next 2 fastest (q) qualified for the final.

Wind:
Heat 1: +3.1 m/s, Heat 2: +2.5 m/s

Rank	Heat	Name	Nationality	Time	Notes
1	2	Tobi Amusan	Nigeria	12.63	Q
2	2	Marione Fourie	South Africa	12.82	Q
3	1	Ebony Morrison	Liberia	12.86	Q
4	2	Ashley Miller	Zimbabwe	13.15	Q
5	2	Marthe Koala	Burkina Faso	13.22	q
6	1	Fiadanantsoa Sidonie	Madagascar	13.44	Q
7	1	Charlize Eilerd	South Africa	13.59	Q
8	1	Lina Gaber	Egypt	13.85	q
9	2	Joy Abu	Nigeria	13.85	
10	2	Priscilla Tabunda	Kenya	13.88	
11	1	Marzaan Loots	South Africa	13.90	
12	2	Madina Touré	Burkina Faso	13.99	
13	1	Alemitu Assefa	Ethiopia	14.46	
14	2	Hirphe Dirbsa	Ethiopia	14.73	
	1	Miracle Thompson	Nigeria	DNS	

=== Final ===
Wind: +4.0 m/s

Rank	Lane	Athlete	Nationality	Time	Notes
1st place, gold medalist(s)	5	Tobi Amusan	Nigeria	12.57	
2nd place, silver medalist(s)	4	Ebony Morrison	Liberia	12.77	
3rd place, bronze medalist(s)	6	Marione Fourie	South Africa	12.93	
4	1	Marthe Koala	Burkina Faso	12.99	
5	7	Ashley Miller	Zimbabwe	13.30	
6	3	Sidonie Fiadanantsoa	Madagascar	13.49	
7	8	Charlize Eilerd	South Africa	13.99	
	2	Lina Gaber	Egypt	DNF	
