= Athletics at the 2022 Commonwealth Games – Women's 100 metres hurdles =

Women's 100 metres hurdles at the 2022 Commonwealth Games
- Venue: Alexander Stadium
- Dates: 5 August (first round); 7 August (final)
- Competitors: 17 from 15 nations
- Winning time: 12.30

Medalists
gold medal	Tobi Amusan	Nigeria
silver medal	Devynne Charlton	Bahamas
bronze medal	Cindy Sember	England

The women's 100 metres hurdles at the 2022 Commonwealth Games, as part of the athletics programme, took place in the Alexander Stadium on 5 and 7 August 2022.

== Records ==
Prior to this competition, the existing world and Games records were as follows:

World record	Tobi Amusan (NGR)	12.12	Eugene, United States	24 July 2022
Commonwealth record	Tobi Amusan (NGR)	12.12	Eugene, United States	24 July 2022
Games record	Brigitte Foster-Hylton (JAM)	12.65	Melbourne, Australia	23 March 2006

== Schedule ==
The schedule was as follows:

Date	Time	Round
Friday 5 August 2022	10:26	First round
Sunday 7 August 2022	10:25	Final

All times are British Summer Time (UTC+1)

== Results ==
=== First round ===
The first round consisted of three heats. The two fastest competitors per heat (plus two fastest non-automatic qualifiers) advanced to the final.

Wind: Heat 1: +2.5 m/s, Heat 2: +2.0 m/s, Heat 3: +2.4 m/s

Rank	Heat	Lane	Name	Result	Notes
1	3	3	Tobi Amusan (NGR)	12.40	Q
2	3	5	Michelle Jenneke (AUS)	12.63	Q
3	1	3	Cindy Sember (ENG)	12.67	Q
4	2	3	Megan Tapper (JAM)	12.68	Q
5	2	5	Devynne Charlton (BAH)	12.70	Q
6	1	5	Danielle Williams (JAM)	12.80	Q
7	3	6	Michelle Harrison (CAN)	12.85	q
8	2	6	Celeste Mucci (AUS)	12.96	q, SB
9	1	7	Marione Fourie (RSA)	13.04	
10	2	4	Jyothi Yarraji (IND)	13.18	
11	3	4	Hannah Connell (BAR)	13.35	
12	1	6	Megan Marrs (NIR)	13.37	
13	2	2	Heather Paton (SCO)	13.39	SB
14	1	4	Natalia Christofi (CYP)	13.42	
15	1	2	Adrine Monagi (PNG)	13.84	
16	2	7	Nur Izlyn Zaini (SGP)	13.93	
17	3	7	Deya Erickson (IVB)	13.94	

=== Final ===
The medals were determined in the final.

Wind: -0.2 m/s

Rank	Lane	Name	Result	Notes
1st place, gold medalist(s)	5	Tobi Amusan (NGR)	12.30	GR
2nd place, silver medalist(s)	7	Devynne Charlton (BAH)	12.58	
3rd place, bronze medalist(s)	3	Cindy Sember (ENG)	12.59	
4	4	Megan Tapper (JAM)	12.67	
5	6	Michelle Jenneke (AUS)	12.68	
6	8	Danielle Williams (JAM)	12.69	
7	1	Celeste Mucci (AUS)	13.03	
8	2	Michelle Harrison (CAN)	25.13	
