= Marione Fourie =

South African athlete (born 2002)

Personal information
- Nationality: South African
- Born: 30 April 2002 (age 24)

Sport
- Sport: Track and Field
- Events: 60 metres hurdles; 100 metres hurdles

Achievements and titles
- Personal bests: 100 m: 11.93 s (2023); 200 m: 25.47 s (2021); 60 mH: 7.91 s (2025, NR); 100 mH: 12.49 s (2024, NR)
Medal record
Women's athletics
Representing South Africa
African Championships
Silver medal – second place	2024 Douala	100 m hurdles
Bronze medal – third place	2022 Port Louis	100m hurdles

Marione Fourie (born 30 April 2002) is a South African athlete who is the national record holder and a multiple-time national champion in the high hurdles.

== Biography ==
Fourie won her first South African national championship in the 100 metres hurdles in 2021. In 2022, Fourie became national champion for the second time, and won the bronze medal at the African Championships in the 100 metres hurdles. She became just the third South African woman of all time to run below 13 seconds for the event. At the 2022 World Athletics Championships, Fourie ran 12.94 seconds to qualify for the semi-finals finishing behind Olympic bronze medalist Megan Tapper in her heat.

In July 2023, Fourie lowered her personal best to 12.55 whilst running in Switzerland to set a new national record. She competed at the 2023 World Athletics Championships in Budapest in August 2023, where she reached the semi-finals. She was named the South Africa Female Athlete of the Year.

In April 2024, Fourie won her fourth consecutive national title over 100 metres hurdles, in Pietermaritzburg. In June 2024, she won silver in the 100 metres hurdles at the African Championships in Douala, Cameroon. In July 2024, she lowered the South African national record to 12.49 seconds in Hengelo. She competed in the 100m hurdles at the 2024 Paris Olympics, reaching the semi-finals.

In January 2025, Fourie set a new South African national record for the 60 metres hurdles, running 7.91 seconds in Luxembourg. She was selected to compete in the 60 metres hurdles at the 2025 World Athletics Indoor Championships in Nanjing in March 2025. She finished third in the 100m hurdles at the 2025 Xiamen Diamond League event in China, in April 2025. She also finished third in the women’s 100m hurdles at the 2025 Shanghai Diamond League. In September, she was a semi-finalist at the 2025 World Athletics Championships in Tokyo, Japan.

In April 2026, Fourie ran her fastest time recorded on South African soil with 12.67 seconds for the 100 m hurdles at the Hezekiel Sepeng Invitational in Potchefstroom. Later that month, she won the women's 100 m hurdles at the South African Championships in 12.69 seconds ahead of Tumi Ramokgopa and placed fourth in 12.62 seconds, 0.13 seconds outside her own South African record, at the 2026 Diamond League event in Rabat. On 4 June, she placed fourth in 12.59 seconds at the Diamond League event in Rome, and on 16 June, placed third at the Golden Spike Ostrava.

Fourie placed fourth overall competing in the 100 metres hurdles at the 2026 Commonwealth Games in Glasgow, Scotland. In September, she competed in the 100 m hurdles at the inaugural World Ultimate Championship in Budapest.

== International competitions ==
Year	Competition	Venue	Position	Event	Notes
Representing South Africa
2021	World U20 Championships	Nairobi, Kenya	9th (sf)	100 m hurdles	13.60
2021	World U20 Championships	Nairobi, Kenya	6th	4 × 100 m relay	45.05
2022	African Championships	Port Louis, Mauritius	3rd	100 m hurdles	12.93
2022	World Championships	Eugene, United States	19th (sf)	100 m hurdles	12.93
2022	Commonwealth Games	Birmingham, United Kingdom	9th (h)	100 m hurdles	13.04
2023	World Championships	Budapest, Hungary	15th (sf)	100 m hurdles	12.89
2024	African Championships	Douala, Cameroon	2nd	100 m hurdles	12.74
2024	Olympic Games	Paris, France	20th (sf)	100 m hurdles	13.01
2025	World Championships	Tokyo, Japan	18th (h)	100 m hurdles	12.86^{1}
2026	Commonwealth Games	Glasgow, United Kingdom	4th	100 m hurdles	12.66 (w)
2026	World Ultimate Championship	Budapest, Hungary	13th (h)	100 m hurdles	12.84

^{1}Disqualified in the semifinals
