= Ashley Miller (hurdler) =

Zimbabwean athlete (born 1998)

Ashley Miller Kamangirira
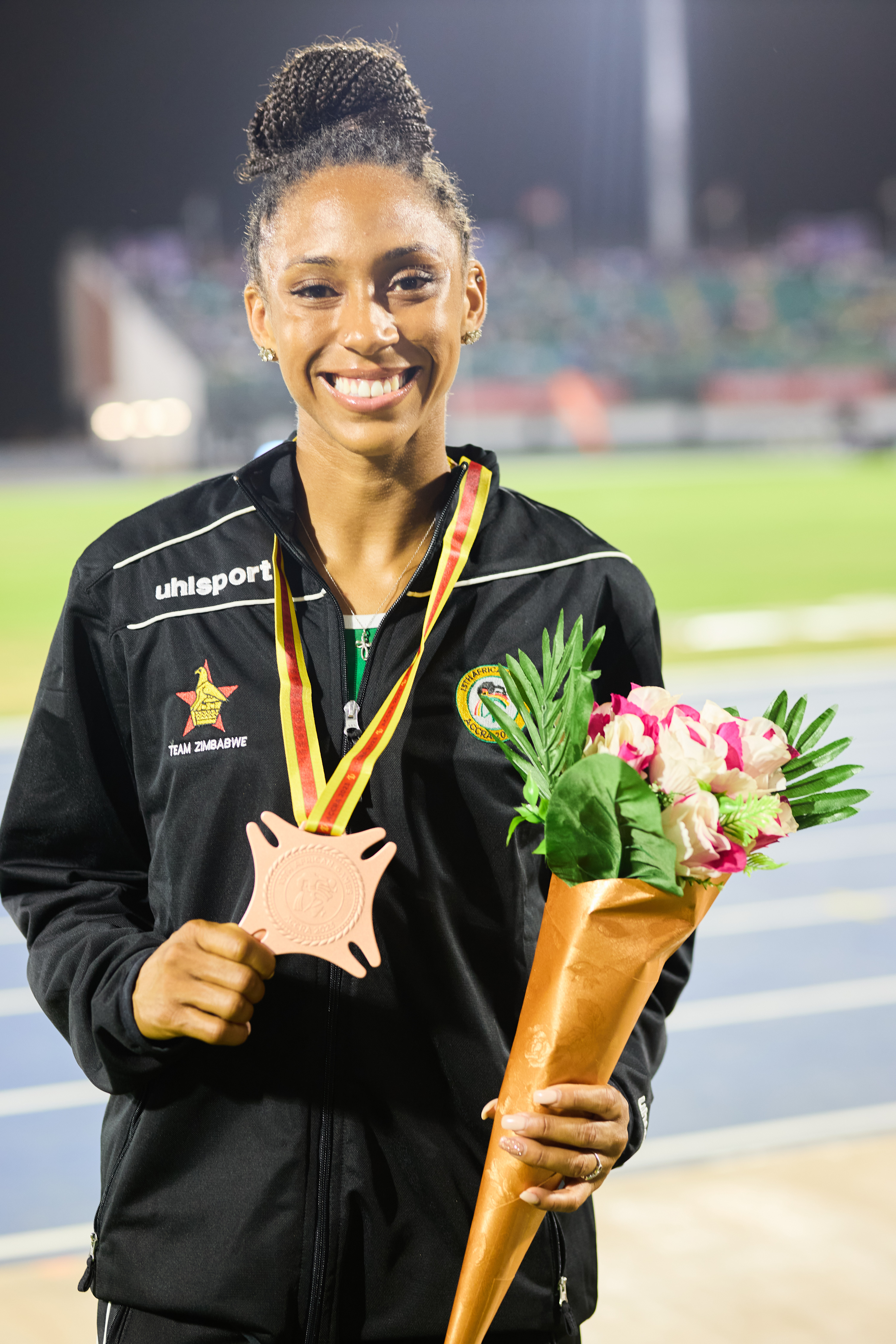
- Kamangirira at the 2023 African Games

Personal information
- Nationality: Zimbabwean
- Born: Ashley Tinashe Miller Kamangira; 17 February 1998 (age 28) Moscow, Idaho, United States

Sport
- Sport: Athletics
- Event: Hurdles

Achievements and titles
- Personal bests: 60m hurdles: 8.14 (2019); 100m hurdles: 13.22 (2016); 400m hurdles: 54.08 (2026) NR
Medal record
Women's athletics
Representing Zimbabwe
African Games
| Bronze medal – third place | 2023 Accra | 100 m hurdles |
African Championships
| Silver medal – second place | 2026 Accra | 100 m hurdles |

Ashley Tinashe Miller Kamangirira (born 17 February 1998) is a Zimbabwean hurdler. She won a bronze medal at the 2023 African Games in the 100 metres hurdles. She is the Zimbabwean national record holder over 400 metres hurdles.

== Early and personal life ==
She was born in Moscow, Idaho. Her father Felix Kamaringira is a former Zimbabwean national team sprinter, who ran over 200 metres and 400 metres during the 1990s. Her American mother Jan Miller also participated in athletics at the University of Idaho, where her parents met. She earned a full scholarship to the University of Texas before later transferring to graduate in Interdisciplinary Studies from Florida State University. She later worked as a strategy analyst for Deloitte.

== Career ==
Although raised in the United States she stated she has a desire to represent Zimbabwe since she was in her teenage years. She became the first USA-born athlete to represent Zimbabwe at international level as she placed fifth in the 100 metres hurdles at the 2022 African Championships in Athletics in St Pierre, Mauritius.

In March 2024, she competed at the delayed 2023 Africa Games in Accra, Ghana winning the bronze medal in the 100m hurdles behind Tobi Amusan and Sidonie Fiadanantsoa. She placed fourth in the 400 metres hurdles at the same championships.

She placed fourth in the 400 metres hurdles at the 2024 African Championships in Athletics in Douala, Cameroon.

She ran 55.09 seconds to set a new national record in the 400 meters hurdles at the Ed Murphey Classic in Memphis, Tennessee in July 2025. She ran 55.14 seconds to win the women’s 400m hurdles of the La Classique d’athlétisme de Montréal in Canada in August 2025.

She was selected for the Zimbabwean team to compete at the 2025 World Athletics Championships in Tokyo, Japan, in the 400 metres hurdles for her debut at the championships, running 56.35 seconds without qualifying for the semi-finals.

Competing in Pretoria, South Africa in April 2026, Miller broke the 300m Zimbabwe women’s national record at the Pilditch Stadium when she ran 36.48 seconds. The following month, Miller won the silver medal in the 100 m hurdles at the 2026 African Championships in Athletics in Accra. Miller ran a lifetime best and nee national record 54.08 seconds for the 400 metres hurdles at the USATF Lone Star Grand Prix in College Station, Texas, on 6 June. In September, she competed in the 400 m hurdles at the inaugural World Ultimate Championship in Budapest.
