= Sidonie Fiadanantsoa =

Malagasy athlete (born 1999)

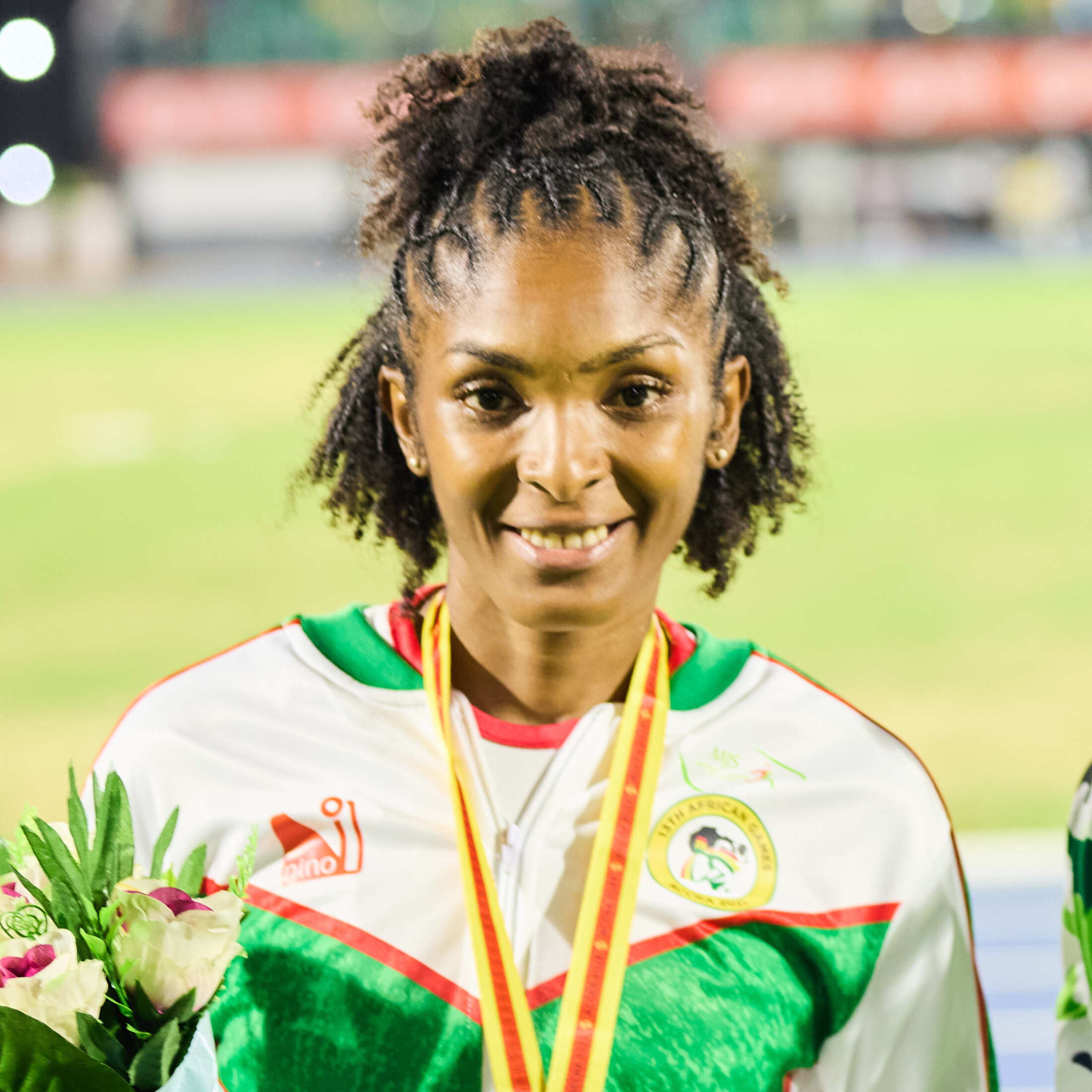
- Fiadanantsoa at the 2023 African Games

Personal information
- Nationality: Malagasy
- Born: 30 April 1999 (age 27)

Sport
- Sport: Athletics
- Event: Hurdles

Achievements and titles
- Personal bests: 60m hurdles: 8.07 (Mondeville, 2024); 100m hurdles: 12.86 (Martinique, 2024)
Medal record
Women's athletics
Representing Madagascar
African Championships
| Bronze medal – third place | 2024 Douala | 100 m hurdles |
African Games
| Silver medal – second place | 2023 Accra | 100 m hurdles |
Jeux de la Francophonie
| Gold medal – first place | 2023 Kinshasa | 100 m hurdles |

Sidonie Fiadanantsoa (born 30 April 1999) is a track and field athlete from Madagascar. She was a silver medalist at the 2023 African Games in the 100m hurdles.

== Career ==
She is a member of the Dakar Athletics Development Center. She ran a 60m hurdles personal best at the 2022 World Athletics Indoor Championships, in Belgrade. She competed in the 100m hurdles at the 2022 World Athletics Championships, in Eugene, Oregon.

She was a gold medalist in the 100m hurdles at the 2023 Francophone Games in Kinshasa in a time of 13.01 seconds. She subsequently competed at the 2023 World Athletics Championships, in Budapest.

In February 2024, she set a new 60m hurdles personal best time in Mondeville in France. In March 2024, she was the flag bearer for her country at the 2023 Africa Games in Accra, Ghana. She won a silver medal in the 100m hurdles, running a time of 13.19 seconds to finish second behind Tobi Amusan.

In June 2024, she won bronze at the African Championships in Douala, Cameroon. She competed in the 100m hurdles at the 2024 Paris Olympics.

In September 2025, she competed at the 2025 World Athletics Championships in Tokyo, Japan.

== International competitions ==
| Year | Competition | Venue | Position | Event | Notes |
Representing Madagascar
| 2019 | African Games | Rabat, Morocco | 7th (h) | 100 m hurdles | 13.68^{1} |
| 2019 | African Games | Rabat, Morocco | 5th | 4 × 100 m relay | 46.02 |
| 2022 | World Indoor Championships | Belgrade, Serbia | 31st (h) | 60 m hurdles | 8.22 |
| 2022 | African Championships | Port Louis, Mauritius | 6th | 100 m hurdles | 13.49 |
| 2022 | African Championships | Port Louis, Mauritius | 6th | 4 × 100 m relay | 46.48 |
| 2022 | World Championships | Eugene, United States | 34th (h) | 100 m hurdles | 13.57 |
| 2023 | Jeux de la Francophonie | Kinshasa, DR Congo | 1st | 100 m hurdles | 13.01 |
| 2023 | World Championships | Budapest, Hungary | 37th (h) | 100 m hurdles | 13.18 |
| 2024 | African Games | Accra, Ghana | 2nd | 100 m hurdles | 13.19 |
| 2024 | African Championships | Douala, Cameroon | 3rd | 100 m hurdles | 12.98 |
| 2024 | Olympic Games | Paris, France | 14th (rep) | 100 m hurdles | 13.12 |
| 2025 | World Indoor Championships | Nanjing, China | 16th (sf) | 60 m hurdles | 8.11 |
| 2025 | World Championships | Tokyo, Japan | 36th (h) | 100 m hurdles | 13.27 |
| 2026 | African Championships | Accra, Ghana | 5th | 100 m hurdles | 13.50 |

^{1}Did not finish in the final
