= Athletics at the 2019 African Games – Women's 100 metres hurdles =

The women's 100 metres hurdles event at the 2019 African Games was held on 27 and 28 August in Rabat.

== Medalists ==
Gold	Silver	Bronze
Tobi Amusan; Nigeria	Marthe Koala; Burkina Faso	Taylon Bieldt; South Africa

== Results ==
=== Heats ===
Qualification: First 3 in each heat (Q) and the next 2 fastest (q) advanced to the final.

Wind:
Heat 1: +2.2 m/s, Heat 2: +0.4 m/s

Rank	Heat	Name	Nationality	Time	Notes
1	1	Tobi Amusan	Nigeria	12.69	Q
2	2	Marthe Koala	Burkina Faso	13.12	Q
3	2	Karel Elodie Ziketh	Ivory Coast	13.30	Q
4	2	Taylon Bieldt	South Africa	13.54	Q
5	2	Grace Ayemoba	Nigeria	13.59	q
6	1	Rosvitha Bodjiho Okou	Ivory Coast	13.63	Q
7	1	Sidonie Fiadanantsoa	Madagascar	13.68	Q
8	1	Kemi Francis	Nigeria	13.86	q
9	1	Lina Ahmed	Egypt	13.97	
10	1	Adama Faye	Senegal	14.20	
11	2	Odile Ahouanwanou	Benin	14.42	
12	2	Cecilia Guambe	Mozambique	14.69	
13	1	Madina Toure	Burkina Faso	14.82	

=== Final ===
Wind: -0.6 m/s

Rank	Lane	Name	Nationality	Time	Notes
1st place, gold medalist(s)	4	Tobi Amusan	Nigeria	12.68	GR
2nd place, silver medalist(s)	7	Marthe Koala	Burkina Faso	13.20	
3rd place, bronze medalist(s)	9	Taylon Bieldt	South Africa	13.40	
4	2	Grace Ayemoba	Nigeria	13.46	
5	6	Rosvitha Bodjiho Okou	Ivory Coast	13.72	
	5	Karel Elodie Ziketh	Ivory Coast	DNF	
	8	Sidonie Fiadanantsoa	Madagascar	DNF	
	3	Kemi Francis	Nigeria	DNF	
