= 2022 African Championships in Athletics – Women's 4 × 100 metres relay =

The women's 4 × 100 metres relay event at the 2022 African Championships in Athletics was held on 9 and 10 June in Port Louis, Mauritius.

== Medalists ==
Gold	Silver	Bronze
Nigeria; Praise Idamadudu; Tima Godbless; Praise Ofoku; Tobi Amusan; Joy Abu*; Balikis Yakubu*	South Africa; Marzaan Loots; Banele Shabangu; Charlize Eilerd; Phindile Kubheka; Tamzin Thomas*	Gambia; Gina Bass; Fatou Sowe; Maimuna Jallow; Jawneh Nyimasata

*Athletes who competed in heats only

== Results ==
=== Heats ===
Qualification: First 3 teams of each heat (Q) plus the next 2 fastest (q) qualified for the final.

Rank	Heat	Nation	Athletes	Time	Notes
1	1	Zambia	Quincy Malekani, Lumeka Katundu, Rhoda Njobvu, Hellen Makumba	44.36	Q
2	2	Botswana	Loungo Matlhaku, Boitshepiso Kelapile, Oarabile Tshosa, Tshepang Manyika	45.02	Q
3	1	South Africa	Banele Shabangu, Charlize Eilerd, Tamzin Thomas, Phindile Kubheka	45.21	Q
4	2	Gambia	Maimouna Jallow, Jawneh Nyimasata, Fatou Sowe, Gina Bass	45.40	Q
5	2	Kenya	Milicent Ndoro, Monica Safania, Eunice Kadogo, Maximila Imali	45.60	Q
6	2	Nigeria	Balikis Yakubu, Praise Ofoku, Tobi Amusan, Joy Abu	46.30	q
7	1	Madagascar	Sidonie Fiadanantsoa, Zo Henintsoa Rakotonary, Claudine Nomenjanahary, Cynthia Félicité Namahako Georges	47.10	Q
8	1	Burkina Faso	Mariam Bance, Fatoumata Koala, Madina Toure, Nemata Nikiema	47.79	q
	1	Namibia	?, ?, ?, ?	DQ	
	2	Ethiopia	Rahel Tesfaye, Yabsira Jarso, Baytula Alayu, Alemitu Assefa	DNF	
	1	Ghana		DNS	

=== Final ===
Rank	Lane	Nation	Competitors	Time	Notes
1st place, gold medalist(s)	2	Nigeria	Praise Idamadudu, Tima Godbless, Praise Ofoku, Tobi Amusan	44.45	
2nd place, silver medalist(s)	4	South Africa	Marzaan Loots, Banele Shabangu, Charlize Eilerd, Phindile Kubheka	44.87	
3rd place, bronze medalist(s)	3	Gambia	Fatou Sowe, Maimuna Jallow, Jawneh Nyimasata, Gina Bass	44.97	
4	8	Kenya	Milicent Ndoro, Monica Safania, Eunice Kadogo, Maximila Imali	45.17	
5	6	Botswana	Loungo Matlhaku, Tshepang Manyika, Winnie Sarefo, Boitshepiso Kelapile	45.93	
6	7	Madagascar	Sidonie Fiadanantsoa, Zo Henintsoa Rakotonary, Claudine Nomenjanahary, Cynthia Félicité Namahako Georges	46.48	
7	1	Burkina Faso	Mariam Bance, Fatoumata Koala, Madina Toure, Sita Sibiri	47.14	
	5	Zambia	Quincy Malekani, Lumeka Katundu, Rhoda Njobvu, Hellen Makumba	DNF	
