= Devynne Charlton =

Bahamian hurdler (born 1995)

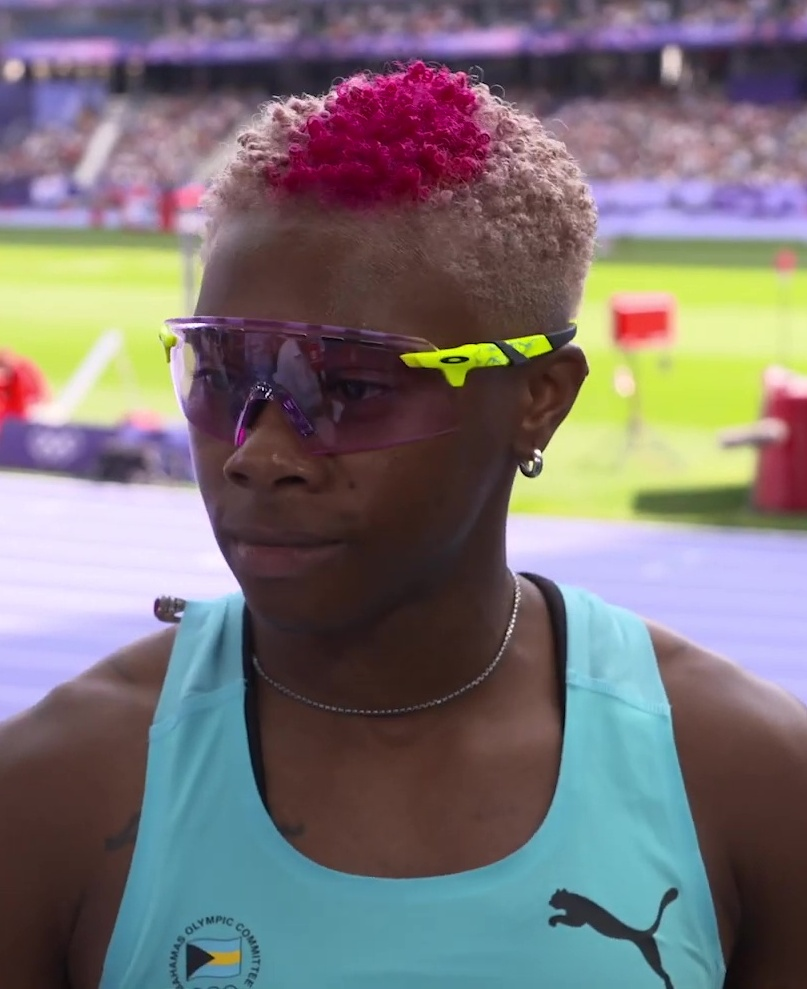
- Charlton at the 2024 Summer Olympics

Personal information
- Full name: Devynne Ashtyn Charlton
- Born: 26 November 1995 (age 30) Nassau, Bahamas
- Education: Purdue University
- Height: 5 ft 3 in (160 cm)

Sport
- Country: Bahamas
- Sport: Track and field
- Events: 100 metres hurdles, 100 metres
Medal record
Women's athletics
Representing the Bahamas
World Indoor Championships
Gold medal – first place	2024 Glasgow	60 m hurdles
Gold medal – first place	2025 Nanjing	60 m hurdles
Gold medal – first place	2026 Toruń	60 m hurdles
Silver medal – second place	2022 Belgrade	60 m hurdles
Commonwealth Games
Gold medal – first place	2026 Glasgow	100 m hurdles
Silver medal – second place	2022 Birmingham	100 m hurdles
NACAC Championships
Silver medal – second place	2022 Freeport	4 × 100 m relay
Bronze medal – third place	2022 Freeport	100 m hurdles
Pan American Junior Championships
Gold medal – first place	2011 Miramar	4 × 100 m relay
Bronze medal – third place	2011 Miramar	4 × 400 m relay
CAC Junior Championships (Junior)
Gold medal – first place	2014 Morelia	100 m hurdles
Bronze medal – third place	2014 Morelia	4 × 100 m relay
CAC Junior Championships (Youth)
Silver medal – second place	2010 Santo Domingo	4 × 100 m relay
Silver medal – second place	2012 San Salvador	4 × 100 m relay
Bronze medal – third place	2012 San Salvador	100 m
Bronze medal – third place	2012 San Salvador	100 m hurdles
CARIFTA Games (Junior)
Gold medal – first place	2012 Hamilton	4 × 100 m relay
Gold medal – first place	2013 Nassau	100 m
Gold medal – first place	2013 Nassau	4 × 100 m relay
Bronze medal – third place	2013 Nassau	100 m hurdles
Bronze medal – third place	2014 Fort-de-France	4 × 100 m relay
CARIFTA Games (Youth)
Gold medal – first place	2011 Montego Bay	100 m
Silver medal – second place	2011 Montego Bay	4 × 100 m relay
Bronze medal – third place	2010 George Town	4 × 100 m relay

Devynne Ashtyn Charlton (born 26 November 1995) is a Bahamian athlete competing in the 60 meters hurdles and 100 m hurdles. Charlton won gold in the 60 m hurdles at the 2024, 2025 and 2026 World Indoor Championships. She won the silver in the 100 m hurdles in the 2022 Commonwealth Games and gold in the event in the 2026 Commonwealth Games. She is the world record holder in the 60 meters hurdles having set the record in 2024 and equalled it in 2026.

== Early life and education ==
Charlton was born in Nassau, Bahamas on 26 November 1995. She is the daughter of Laura and David Charlton. Her sister is the long jumper, Anthaya Charlton.

Charlton studied at St Augustine's College secondary school in Nassau, Bahamas. She attended Purdue University from 2013 to 2018, where she was an All-American and Big Ten Athlete of the Year three times.

== Athletics career ==
Charlton represented her country at the 2015 and 2017 World Athletics Championships but did not make the final.

She represented the Bahamas at the 2020 Tokyo Olympics, finishing sixth in the 100 m hurdles event.

Charlton won the silver medal in the event at the 2022 Commonwealth Games. She took silver for the 60 m hurdles at the 2022 World Indoor Championships, setting a national record of 7.81 seconds.

In 2024, Charlton set the world record for the 60 metres hurdles at 7.67 seconds at the 116th Millrose Games. She further broke the world record with a 7.65 run at the 2024 World Indoor Championships, claiming gold in the event. Charlton followed her win with wins at the 2025 World Indoor Championships and the 2026 World Indoor Championships, where she equalled her world record time of 7.65.

A few months later, Charlton won gold in the 100 metres hurdles at the 2026 Commonwealth Games.

== Achievements ==
=== International competitions ===
Representing the Bahamas
Year	Competition	Venue	Position	Event	Time
2010	CARIFTA Games (U17)	George Town, Cayman Islands	8th	100 m	12.40
2010	CARIFTA Games (U17)	George Town, Cayman Islands	5th	100 m hurdles	14.73 (w)
2010	CARIFTA Games (U17)	George Town, Cayman Islands	3rd	4 × 100 m relay	46.85
2010	Central American and Caribbean; Junior Championships (U18)	Santo Domingo, Dominican Republic	2nd	4 × 100 m relay	46.64
2011	CARIFTA Games (U17)	Montego Bay, Jamaica	1st	100 m	11.91
2011	CARIFTA Games (U17)	Montego Bay, Jamaica	4th	100 m hurdles	14.19
2011	CARIFTA Games (U17)	Montego Bay, Jamaica	2nd	4 × 100 m relay	46.16
2011	World Youth Championships	Lille, France	16th (sf)	100 m	12.33
2011	World Youth Championships	Lille, France	12th (h)	Medley relay	2:11.10
2011	Pan American Junior Championships	Miramar, FL, United States	1st	4 × 100 m relay	45.09
2011	Pan American Junior Championships	Miramar, FL, United States	3rd	4 × 400 m relay	3:42.61
2012	CARIFTA Games (U20)	Hamilton, Bermuda	5th	100 m hurdles	13.97
2012	CARIFTA Games (U20)	Hamilton, Bermuda	1st	4 × 100 m relay	45.02
2012	Central American and Caribbean; Junior Championships (U18)	San Salvador, El Salvador	3rd	100 m	11.97
2012	Central American and Caribbean; Junior Championships (U18)	San Salvador, El Salvador	3rd	100 m hurdles	13.77
2012	Central American and Caribbean; Junior Championships (U18)	San Salvador, El Salvador	2nd	4 × 100 m relay	45.72
2012	World Junior Championships	Barcelona, Spain	36th (h)	100 m hurdles	14.20
2012	World Junior Championships	Barcelona, Spain	–	4 × 100 m relay	DNF
2013	CARIFTA Games (U20)	Nassau, Bahamas	1st	100 m	11.60
2013	CARIFTA Games (U20)	Nassau, Bahamas	3rd	100 m hurdles	14.25
2013	CARIFTA Games (U20)	Nassau, Bahamas	1st	4 × 100 m relay	44.77
2014	CARIFTA Games (U20)	Fort-de-France, Martinique	7th	100 m	11.68 (w)
2014	CARIFTA Games (U20)	Fort-de-France, Martinique	3rd	4 × 100 m relay	45.47
2014	Central American and Caribbean; Junior Championships (U20)	Morelia, Mexico	1st	100 m hurdles	13.56
2014	Central American and Caribbean; Junior Championships (U20)	Morelia, Mexico	3rd	4 × 100 m relay	45.73
2014	World Junior Championships	Barcelona, Spain	9th (sf)	100 m hurdles	13.36 (w)
2014	World Junior Championships	Barcelona, Spain	–	4 × 100 m relay	DQ
2015	Pan American Games	Toronto, Canada	13th (h)	100 m hurdles	13.22 (w)
2015	Pan American Games	Toronto, Canada	7th	4 × 100 m relay	44.38
2015	NACAC Championships	San José, Costa Rica	6th	100 m hurdles	13.01 (w)
2015	NACAC Championships	San José, Costa Rica	4th	4 × 100 m relay	44.28
2015	World Championships	Beijing, China	27th (h)	100 m hurdles	13.16
2017	World Championships	London, United Kingdom	13th (sf)	100 m hurdles	12.95
2017	World Championships	London, United Kingdom	–	4 × 100 m relay	DNF
2018	World Indoor Championships	Birmingham, United Kingdom	8th	60 m hurdles	8.18
2018	NACAC Championships	Toronto, Canada	5th	100 m hurdles	13.01
2019	Pan American Games	Lima, Peru	10th (h)	100 m hurdles	13.49
2019	Pan American Games	Lima, Peru	–	4 × 100 m relay	DNF
2021	Olympic Games	Tokyo, Japan	6th	100 m hurdles	12.74
2022	World Indoor Championships	Belgrade, Serbia	2nd	60 m hurdles	7.81 NR
2022	World Championships	Eugene, OR, United States	7th	100 m hurdles	12.53
2022	Commonwealth Games	Birmingham, United Kingdom	2nd	100 m hurdles	12.58
2022	NACAC Championships	Freeport, Bahamas	3rd	100 m hurdles	12.71
2022	NACAC Championships	Freeport, Bahamas	2nd	4 × 100 m relay	43.34
2023	World Championships	Budapest, Hungary	4th	100 m hurdles	12.52
2024	World Indoor Championships	Glasgow, United Kingdom	1st	60 m hurdles	7.65 WR
2024	Olympic Games	Paris, France	6th	100 m hurdles	12.56
2025	World Indoor Championships	Nanjing, China	1st	60 m hurdles	7.72
2025	World Championships	Tokyo, Japan	6th	100 m hurdles	12.49
2026	World Indoor Championships	Toruń, Poland	1st	60 m hurdles	7.65 =WR
2026	Commonwealth Games	Glasgow, United Kingdom	1st	100 m hurdles	12.33 w
2026	World Ultimate Championship	Budapest, Hungary	4th	100 m hurdles	12.40

=== Personal bests ===
- 60 metres indoor – 7.26 (Geneva, OH 25 FEB 2017)
- 60 metres hurdles indoor – 7.65 (Glasgow 3 March 2024, Toruń 22 March 2026) World record
- 100 metres – 11.22 (+0.6 m/s) (Bloomington, IN 13 MAY 2018)
- 200 metres – 23.53 (Geneva, OH 25 February 2017)
- 100 metres hurdles – 12.33 (+1.0 m/s) (Brussels 5 September 2026) National Record

Olympic Games
Preceded by Joanna Evans; Donald Thomas	Flag bearer for Bahamas; Paris 2024 with Steven Gardiner	Succeeded by Incumbent
