= Jasmine Camacho-Quinn =

Stateside Puerto Rican hurdler (born 1996)

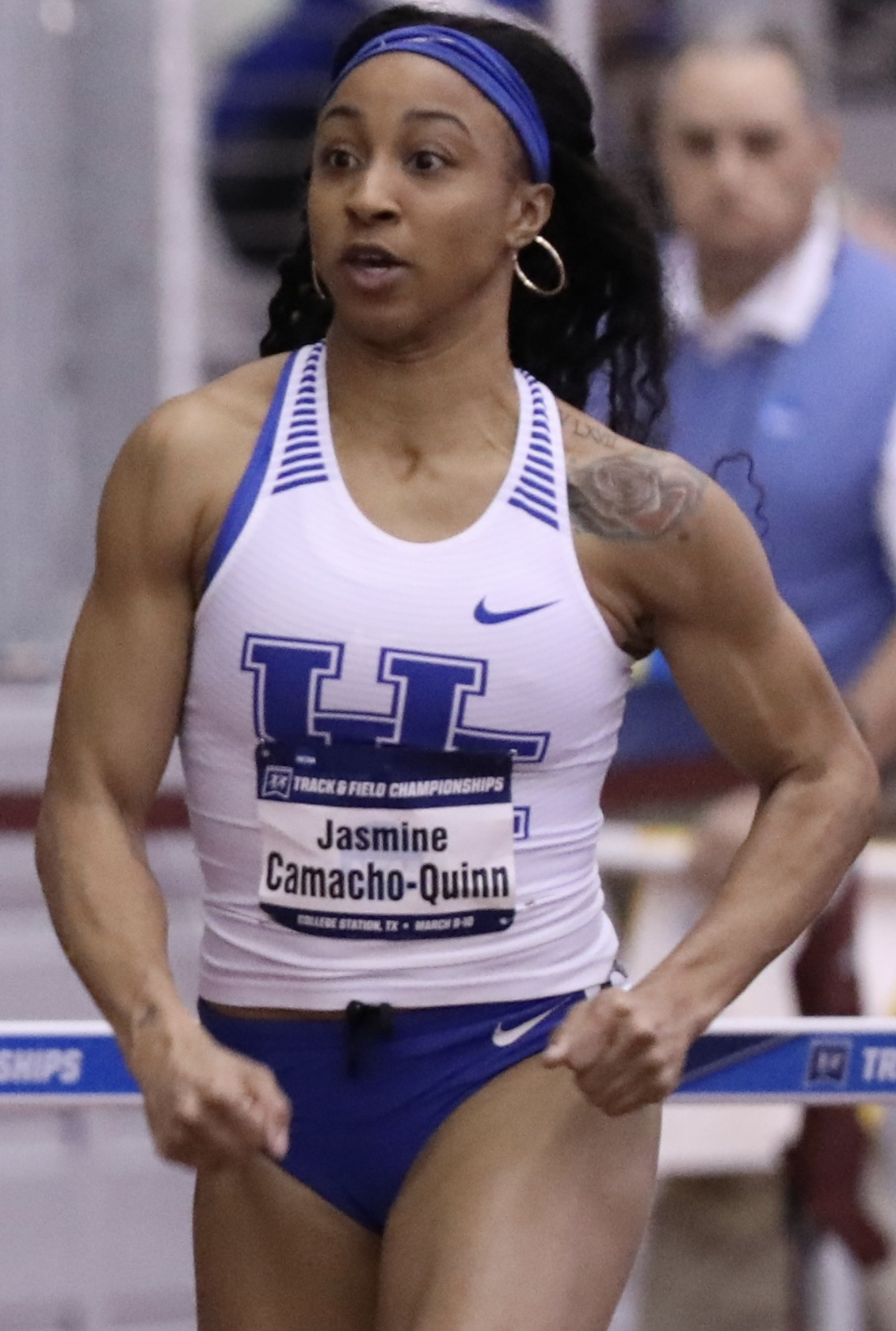
- Camacho-Quinn in 2018

Personal information
- Born: 21 August 1996 (age 30) Charleston, South Carolina, U.S.
- Home town: Orlando, FL
- Height: 5 ft 8 in (173 cm)
- Weight: 161 lb (73 kg)

Sport
- Country: Puerto Rico
- Sport: Track and field
- Events: Hurdles, Sprints, Long jump
- College team: Kentucky Wildcats (2016–2018)
- Team: Nike
- Turned pro: 2018
- Coached by: John Coghlan

Achievements and titles
- Highest world ranking: 100 m hurdles: 1st; 200 m: 41st
- Personal bests: 100 m hurdles: 12.26 OR NR (2021); 100 m: 11.22 NR (2020); 200 m: 22.45 (2020)
Medal record
Women's athletics
Representing Puerto Rico
Olympic Games
Gold medal – first place	2020 Tokyo	100 m hurdles
Bronze medal – third place	2024 Paris	100 m hurdles
World Championships
Silver medal – second place	2023 Budapest	100 m hurdles
Bronze medal – third place	2022 Eugene	100 m hurdles
Diamond League
First place	2024	100 m hurdles
Central American and Caribbean Games
Gold medal – first place	2023 San Salvador	100 m hurdles
NACAC U23 Championship
Gold medal – first place	2016 San Salvador	100 m hurdles

Jasmine Camacho-Quinn (born 21 August 1996) is a Stateside Puerto Rican track and field athlete who specializes in the 100 metres hurdles. At the 2020 Tokyo Olympics, she became the first Puerto Rican of Afro-Latino descent and the second person representing Puerto Rico to win a gold medal. In the semi-finals, Camacho-Quinn set her personal best and Olympic record of 12.26 seconds, which is tied for the tenth fastest time in history. She won a bronze medal at the 2022 World Athletics Championships and a silver medal at the 2023 World Athletics Championships. In the 2024 Paris Olympics, she won a bronze medal, her second one, becoming the only Puerto Rican to have won two Olympic medals.

Camacho-Quinn was a two-time individual NCAA Division I champion.

== Career ==
In 2016, Camacho-Quinn won gold in the 100 m hurdles at the NCAA Division I Championships. She participated at the 2016 Rio Olympics in her specialty event, achieving 12.70 seconds in the heats, a time that would have secured her fifth place in the final. However, she was disqualified in the semi-finals after hitting a hurdle.

Camacho-Quinn set a new personal best of 12.58 s in finishing second at the 2017 NCAA Division I Championships. The following year, she returned to winning ways by finishing 1st at the 2018 NCAA Division I Championships.

In 2021, Camacho-Quinn won her first Diamond League at the Golden Gala with a new personal best time of 12.38 s. She won gold at the delayed 2020 Tokyo Olympics, having set an Olympic record in the semi-finals.

At the 2022 World Championships in Eugene, Oregon, she won bronze with a time of 12.23 sw finishing behind Tobi Amusan and Britany Anderson.

In 2023, Camacho-Quinn opened her season by winning the Doha Diamond League in a time of 12.48 s. Later that year, she won silver at the 2023 World Championships with a time of 12.44 s.

She competed at the 2024 Paris Olympics, winning bronze in the 100 m hurdles. On September 26, she won the first edition of the female-only Athlos track meet with a time of 12.36 s.

In September 2024, it was announced that she had signed up for the inaugural season of the Michael Johnson founded Grand Slam Track.

== Personal life ==
Her parents are James Quinn, an African-American man, and María Milagros Camacho, a Puerto Rican woman. Both competed in athletics at Baptist College (now Charleston Southern University) in Charleston, South Carolina, with her father competing in hurdles and her mother as a sprint runner and long jumper. Camacho-Quinn's mother is from Trujillo Alto, Puerto Rico, which made Camacho-Quinn eligible to represent Puerto Rico in international competitions, including in the Olympics. National Football League (NFL) player Robert Quinn is her brother. Jasmine graduated from Fort Dorchester High School, in North Charleston, South Carolina.

In May 2026, announced that she was expecting her first child.

=== Identity ===
Born and raised in South Carolina, Camacho-Quinn decided later in life that she wanted to know more about her mother's side of the family, who live in Trujillo Alto, Puerto Rico. She identifies as a Puerto Rican. In July 2021, she tweeted about her mother, "You see my mommy? The PUERTO RICAN woman that birthed me?" and stated "I am Puerto Rican" in a video posted by the Puerto Rican Olympic Committee.

Camacho-Quinn is the first Afro-Puerto Rican to win a gold medal. This was celebrated by social anthropologist Bárbara Abadía-Rexach, who stated, "Camacho-Quinn’s victory is a pioneering example for black girls on the island that shows them they can achieve whatever they set their minds to, despite the systemic barriers they will encounter due to their gender, race and ethnicity."

== Achievements ==
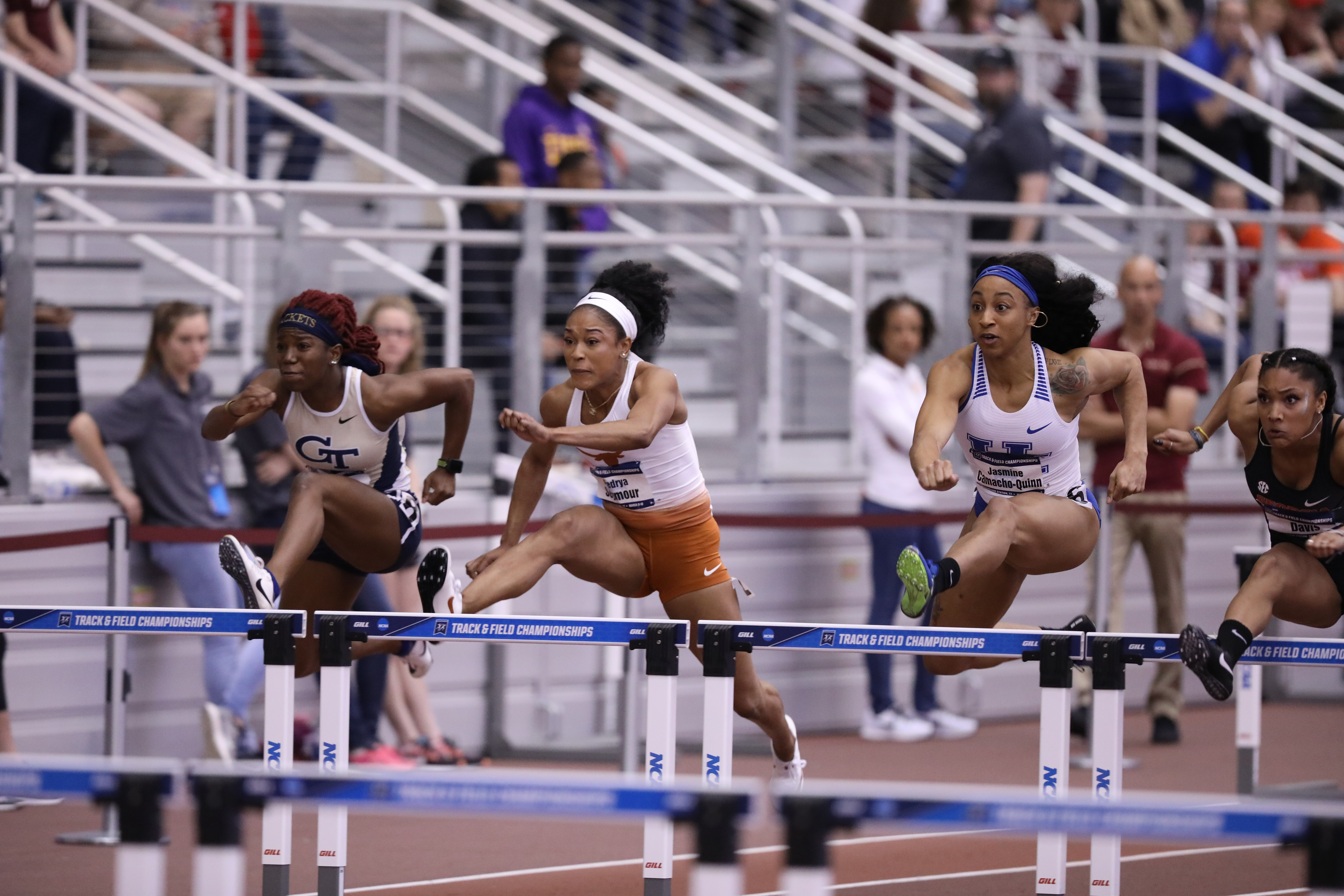
Camacho-Quinn (R) races the 60 m hurdles at the 2018 NCAA Division I Indoor Championships.

All information taken from World Athletics profile unless otherwise noted.

=== International competitions ===
Representing Puerto Rico
Year	Competition	Venue	Position	Event	Time	Notes
2016	NACAC U23 Championships	San Salvador, El Salvador	1st	100 m hurdles	12.78	(wind: -1.5 m/s)
2016	Olympic Games	Rio de Janeiro Brazil	– (sf)	100 m hurdles	DQ	R168.7b
2021	Olympic Games	Tokyo, Japan	1st	100 m hurdles	12.37	(wind: -0.3 m/s)
2022	World Championships	Eugene, United States	3rd	100 m hurdles	12.23	(wind: +2.5 m/s)
2023	Central American and Caribbean Games	San Salvador, El Salvador	1st	100 m hurdles	12.61	
2023	World Championships	Budapest, Hungary	2nd	100 m hurdles	12.44	(wind: -0.2 m/s)
2024	Olympic Games	Paris, France	3rd	100 m hurdles	12.36	(wind: -0.3 m/s)

==== Wins ====
- Diamond League

100 metres hurdles wins, other events specified in parentheses

- 2021 (1): Rome Golden Gala in Florence (MR)
- 2022 (6): Eugene Prefontaine Classic, Rome (WL MR), Stockholm Bauhaus-Galan, Chorzów Kamila Skolimowska Memorial (MR), Lausanne Athletissima (MR), Brussels Memorial Van Damme (SB MR)
- 2023 (2): Doha Diamond League (SB), Lausanne Athletissima

== Personal bests ==
Information from her World Athletics profile unless otherwise noted.

=== Individual events ===
Type	Event	Time (s)	Venue	Date	Record	Notes
Outdoor	60 metres	7.48	Marietta, United States	29 July 2020		(Wind: +0.3 m/s)
Outdoor	100 metres	11.22	Clermont, United States	24 July 2020	NR	(Wind: +0.9 m/s)
Outdoor	150 metres	16.91	Marietta, United States	29 July 2020	NBP	(Wind: 0.0 m/s)
Outdoor	200 metres	22.27	Carolina, Puerto Rico	18 March 2022		(Wind: +1.2 m/s)
Outdoor	300 metres	36.12	Alachua, United States	5 July 2020	NBP	
Outdoor	100 metres hurdles	12.26	Tokyo, Japan	1 August 2021	NR	(Wind: -0.2 m/s)
Outdoor	300 metres hurdles	47.86	Union City, United States	19 May 2012		
Outdoor	Long jump	6.15 m	Columbia, United States	17 May 2014		(Wind: +0.6 m/s)
Outdoor	4 × 100 metres relay	42.30	Knoxville, United States	13 May 2018		Paired with Celera Barnes, Kayelle Clarke and Khianna Gray
Outdoor	4 × 200 metres relay	1:30.76	Knoxville, United States	14 April 2018		Paired with Sydney McLaughlin, Kayelle Clarke and Celera Barnes
Outdoor	4 × 400 metres relay	3:25.99	Knoxville, United States	13 May 2018		Paired with Faith Ross, Sydney McLaughlin and Kayelle Clarke
Indoor	60 metres hurdles	7.95 i	Clemson, United States	9 February 2018	NR	
Indoor	200 metres short track	22.81 i	Louisville, United States	12 February 2022	NR	
Indoor	4 × 400 metres relay short track	3:30.08 i	College Station, United States	10 March 2018		Paired with Faith Ross, Sydney McLaughlin and Kayelle Clarke

==== Season's bests ====
Year	100 m hurdles
2011	15.52
2012	—N/a
2013	13.84
2014	13.37
2015	—N/a
2016	12.69
2017	12.58
2018	12.40
2019	12.82
2020	—N/a
2021	**12.26**
2022	12.27
2023	12.31
2024	12.35

Key: Lifetime best (in bold)

=== American championships ===
Representing Kentucky Wildcats (2016–2018)
Year	Competition	Venue	Position	Event	Time	Notes
2013	NSAF Nationals	Greensboro, North Carolina	6th	100 m hurdles	14.10	(wind: -1.4 m/s)
2013	NSAF Nationals	Greensboro, North Carolina	4th	Long jump	5.86	(wind: +2.0 m/s)
2016	NCAA Division I Championships	Eugene, Oregon	8th	200 m	23.07	(wind: +1.9 m/s)
2016	NCAA Division I Championships	Eugene, Oregon	1st	100 m hurdles	12.54	(wind: +3.8 m/s)
2016	NCAA Division I Championships	Eugene, Oregon	5th	4 × 100 m relay	43.02	
2016	U.S. Olympic Trials	Eugene, Oregon	10th (sf)	100 m hurdles	13.02	(wind: -1.1 m/s)
2017	NCAA Division I Indoor Championships	College Station, Texas	13th (p)	200 m	23.38	
2017	NCAA Division I Indoor Championships	College Station, Texas	7th	60 m hurdles	8.11	
2017	NCAA Division I Championships	Eugene, Oregon	12th (p)	200 m	23.24	(wind: +1.9 m/s)
2017	NCAA Division I Championships	Eugene, Oregon	2nd	100 m hurdles	12.58	(wind: +1.6 m/s)
2017	NCAA Division I Championships	Eugene, Oregon	1st	4 × 100 m relay	42.51	
2018	NCAA Division I Indoor Championships	College Station, Texas	7th	200 m	23.05	
2018	NCAA Division I Indoor Championships	College Station, Texas	3rd	60 m hurdles	7.96	
2018	NCAA Division I Indoor Championships	College Station, Texas	5th	4 × 400 m relay	3:30.08	
2018	NCAA Division I Championships	Eugene, Oregon	20th (p)	200 m	23.44	(wind: +2.2 m/s)
2018	NCAA Division I Championships	Eugene, Oregon	1st	100 m hurdles	12.70	(wind: +0.9 m/s)
2018	NCAA Division I Championships	Eugene, Oregon	4th	4 × 100 m relay	43.49	
2018	NCAA Division I Championships	Eugene, Oregon	4th	4 × 400 m relay	3:30.52	
2021	USATF Open	Fort Worth, Texas	1st	100 m hurdles	12.84	(wind: -2.1 m/s)

== See also ==
- List of Puerto Ricans
- List of Olympic medalists in athletics (women)
- 100 metres hurdles

Records
Preceded by Sally Pearson (AUS)	Women's 100 m hurdles Olympic record holder 1 August 2021 – present	Incumbent
Olympic Games
Preceded by William Flaherty	Flagbearer for Puerto Rico with Sebastian Rivera; Paris 2024	Succeeded by Incumbent
