= Adaobi Tabugbo =

Nigerian athletics competitor (born 2001)

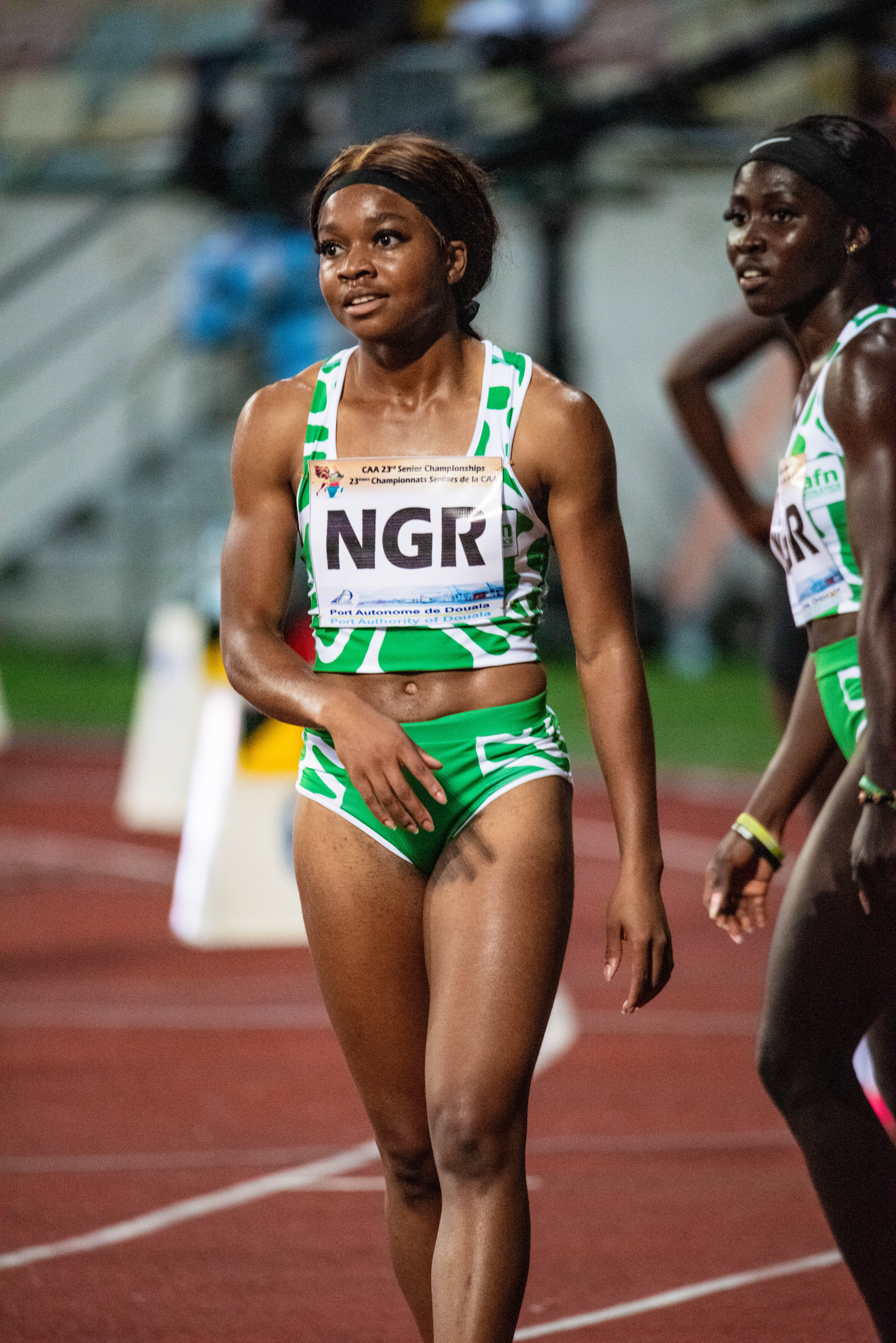
- Tabugbo in 2024

Personal information
- National team: Nigeria
- Born: October 3, 2001 (age 25) Laurel, Maryland, United States
- Education: Reservoir High School; Brigham Young University; University of Central Florida
- Height: 5 ft 5 in (165 cm)

Sport
- Sport: Athletics
- College team: BYU Cougars; UCF Knights
Medal record
Women's athletics
Representing Nigeria
African Championships
Bronze medal – third place	2026 Accra	100 m hurdles

Adaobi Tabugbo (born October 3, 2001) is an American born Nigerian athletics competitor. She competes in hurdling 60-meter and 100-meter events.

== Career ==
Tabugbo was born on October 3, 2001, and was raised in Laurel, Maryland, United States. She attended the Reservoir High School, Brigham Young University and the University of Central Florida. She has five brothers.

Tabugbo is a fluent speaker of the Igbo language and competes internationally for Nigeria.

In June 2024 at the 2024 African Championships in Athletics in Douala, Cameroon, Tabugbo finished fifth in the 100-meter hurdles with a time of 13.47 seconds. She was also a member of the Nigerian 4x100-meter relay team in the heat stage, contributing to their gold medal win in the final race. At the Nigeria Olympic trials in the same month, Tabugbo came second in the women's 100-meter hurdles with a time of 13.33 seconds, finishing behind Tobi Amusan who went on to compete at the 2024 Olympic Games in Paris, France.

In January 2025 at the Stan Scott Invite in Lubbock, Texas, Tabugbo won the 60-meter hurdles with a time of 8.06 seconds, ranking in the top 10 times in the nation that year.

In March 2025 at the Big 12 Indoor Championships in Texas, United States, Tabugbo broke the 8-second barrier in the women's 60-meter hurdles, set a new personal best and won a silver medal in the event. She also ran with the Florida Knights 4x100-meter women's relay team, with the team win bronze. The event earned Tabugbo a place at the 2025 National Collegiate Athletic Association Outdoor Championships in Eugene, Oregon, where she placed 12th in the preliminary round of the Championships with a time of 13.08 seconds.

In May 2025 at the East Coast Relays at the University of North Florida, in Jacksonville, Florida, Tabugbo won her 100-meter hurdles heat with a time of 13.06 seconds, then came third in the final with a time of 13.08 seconds.

In July 2025 at the Ed Murphey Classic in Memphis, Tennessee, Tabugbo recorded a time of 12.93 seconds in the 100-meter hurdles.

In August 2025 at the Grande Prêmio Brasil de Atletismo in São Paulo, Brazil, Tabugbo won the women's 100-meter hurdles with a time of 12.90 seconds. Tabugbo also competed at the Athletics Federation of Nigeria National Championships in Lagos, Nigeria, in 2025. She came second with a time of 13.03 seconds.

In November 2025, Tabugbo was among elite athletes who called on the 2025 United Nations Climate Change Conference (COP30) to prioritize funding for climate adaptation. Tabugbo is training towards the 2028 Summer Olympics.
