= Athletics at the 2014 African Youth Games =

- Dates: 28 – 31 May
- Host city: Gaborone, Botswana
- Venue: Botswana National Stadium
- Level: Youth (under 18)
- Events: 36

The athletics competitions at the 2014 African Youth Games in Gaborone was held between 28 and 31 May at the Botswana National Stadium. The competition served as the qualification for the 2014 Summer Youth Olympics which took place in August in Nanjing, China.

== Medal summary ==
=== Boys ===
Event	Gold		Silver		Bronze	
100 metres (wind: -1.1 m/s)	Ronald Rakaku (RSA)	10.52	Sydney Siame (ZAM)	10.58	Baboloki Thebe (BOT)	10.65
200 metres (wind: +1.0 m/s)	Baboloki Thebe (BOT)	20.85	Brian Kasinda (ZAM)	21.02	Kyle Appel (RSA)	21.07
400 metres	Karabo Sibanda (BOT)	46.77	Ian Mutuku (KEN)	47.20	Gemechu Alemu (ETH)	47.46
800 metres	Anthony Kiptoo (KEN)	1:52.07	Gorata Gabanketse (BOT)	1:52.52	Godfery Chama (ZAM)	1:53.09
1500 metres	Gilbert Kwemoi Soet (KEN)	3:45.39	Mulugeta Asefa (ETH)	3:46.84	Mostafa Smaili (MAR)	3:47.99
3000 metres	Yomif Kejelcha (ETH)	7:56.51	Moses Koech (KEN)	8:05.22	Thiery Ndikumwenayo (BDI)	8:17.93
110 metres hurdles (91.4 cm) (wind: +0.1 m/s)	Bashiru Abdulai (NGR)	13.98	Amine Bouanani (ALG)	14.09	Henok Masresha (ETH)	14.25
400 metres hurdles (84.0 cm)	Mohamed Fares Jlassi (TUN)	51.52	Geoffrey Kipngetich (KEN)	52.76	Justeen Axemia (SEY)	53.27
2000 m steeplechase	Wegene Sebsibe (ETH)	5:35.86	Hicham Chemlal (MAR)	5:37.63	Amos Kirui (KEN)	5:39.23
10,000 m track walk	Gemechu Amanuel (ETH)	45:30.61	Djaber Bouras (ALG)	46:48.67	Pierre Vermaak (RSA)	47:02.26
High jump	Bouhanoune Hichem (ALG)	2.02	Gemechutemiru Gndgnra (ETH)	1.99	Ujaha Vizamuje (NAM)	1.99
Pole vault	Oussama Nasri (TUN)	4.20	Not awarded		Not awarded	
Long jump	Yasser Triki (ALG)	7.63	David Ejumeta (NGR)	7.24	Mouhcine Khoua (MAR)	7.23
Triple jump	Fabian Edoki (NGR)	15.93	Precious Attipoe (GHA)	15.43	Yasser Triki (ALG)	15.23
Shot put (5 kg)	Jason van Rooyen (RSA)	21.02	Mohamed Abulaziz (EGY)	19.95	Aleddine Chaalal (ALG)	19.91
Discus throw (1.5 kg)	Hassan Elshabnawry (EGY)	57.62	Zakaria Al-Ahmer (LBA)	55.32	Jason van Rooyen (RSA)	54.22
Hammer throw (5 kg)	Ahmed Tarek Ismail (EGY)	77.76	Firas Ben Said (TUN)	61.18	Stéphane Benoit (MRI)	38.99
Javelin throw (700 g)	Baha Sherif Khalil (EGY)	71.84	Ubang Abola (ETH)	66.59	Mohamed Al-Daghali (LBA)	55.47

=== Girls ===
Event	Gold		Silver		Bronze	
100 metres (wind: -0.1 m/s)	Mercy Ntia-Obong (NGR)	12.00	Janet Mensah (GHA)	12.03	Prenam Pesse (TOG)	12.34
200 metres	Praise Idamadudu (NGR)	24.16	Maureen Nyatichi Thomas (KEN)	24.20	Genet Lira (ETH)	24.40
400 metres	Genet Lira (ETH)	52.40	Edidiong Odiong (NGR)	53.64	Galefele Moroko (BOT)	56.01
800 metres	Hawi Alemu (ETH)	2:06.74	Agnes Mulee Ngovi (KEN)	2:08.00	Martha Bissah (GHA)	2:09.50
1500 metres	Kokebe Tesfaye (ETH)	4:24.94	Winfred Mbithe (KEN)	4:26.81	Mary Joy Mudyiravanji (ZIM)	4:33.91
3000 metres	Berhan Demesse (ETH)	9:18.97	Jackline Chepkoech (KEN)	9:22.34	Cavaline Nahimana (BDI)	9:24.51
100 metres hurdles (76.2 cm) (wind: -1.4 m/s)	Taylon Bieldt (RSA)	13.58	Oluwatobiloba Amusan (NGR)	13.92	Lina Ahmed (EGY)	14.04
400 metres hurdles	Gezella Magerman (RSA)	1:00.10	Abimbola Junaid (NGR)	1:00.40	Safa Malik (SUD)	1:00.40
2000 m steeplechase	Rosefline Chepngetich (KEN)	6:21.81	Zewdenesh Mamo (ETH)	6:24.59	Nadia El Hakouni (MAR)	6:56.09
5000 m track walk	Beza Berhanu (ETH)	24:54.01	Riheb Mansouri (TUN)	25:12.43	Soukaina Bouaoud (MAR)	32:18.29
High jump	Riham Hamdy Kamal (EGY)	1.75	Yousra Arar (ALG)	1.70	Kristien Kruger (NAM)	1.65
Pole vault	May Mezioud (ALG)	2.90	Sokayna Talhi (MAR)	2.80	Not awarded	
Long jump	Esraa Owis (EGY)	5.95	Carla Johnson (RSA)	5.72	Nyebolo Ugada (ETH)	5.67
Triple jump	Nyebolo Ugada (ETH)	12.56	Loubna Bensi Ali (ALG)	12.42	Esraa Owis (EGY)	12.34
Shot put (3 kg)	Yolandi Stander (RSA)	15.72	Amira Khaled Mahmoud (EGY)	13.90	Mercy Laker (UGA)	12.75
Discus throw	Leandri Geel (RSA)	47.08	Amira Khaled Mahmoud (EGY)	46.15	Mercy Laker (UGA)	34.51
Hammer throw (3 kg)	Esraa Habe (EGY)	66.26	Nadia Meiring (RSA)	55.25	Tapiwa Chetsanga (ZIM)	27.68
Javelin throw (500 g)	Jo-Ane van Dyk (RSA)	47.62	Shura Utura (ETH)	46.35	Salma Taha (EGY)	41.60

== Medal table ==
* Host nation (Botswana)

Rank	Nation	Gold	Silver	Bronze	Total
1	Ethiopia (ETH)	9	5	4	18
2	South Africa (RSA)	7	2	3	12
3	Egypt (EGY)	6	3	3	12
4	Nigeria (NGR)	4	4	0	8
5	Kenya (KEN)	3	7	1	11
6	Algeria (ALG)	3	4	2	9
7	Tunisia (TUN)	2	2	0	4
8	Botswana (BOT)*	2	1	2	5
9	Morocco (MAR)	0	2	4	6
10	Ghana (GHA)	0	2	1	3
10	Zambia (ZAM)	0	2	1	3
12	Libya (LBA)	0	1	1	2
13	Burundi (BDI)	0	0	2	2
13	Namibia (NAM)	0	0	2	2
13	Uganda (UGA)	0	0	2	2
13	Zimbabwe (ZIM)	0	0	2	2
17	Mauritius (MRI)	0	0	1	1
17	Seychelles (SEY)	0	0	1	1
17	Sudan (SUD)	0	0	1	1
17	Togo (TOG)	0	0	1	1
Totals (20 entries)		36	35	34	105
