= 2026 African Championships in Athletics – Women's 100 metres hurdles =

Women's 100 metres hurdles at the 2026 African Championships in Athletics
- Venue: Legon Sports Stadium
- Location: Accra, Ghana
- Dates: 12–13 May
- Winning time: 12.84

Medalists
gold medal	Tobi Amusan	Nigeria
silver medal	Ashley Miller	Zimbabwe
bronze medal	Adaobi Tabugbo	Nigeria

The women's 100 metres hurdles event at the 2026 African Championships in Athletics was held on 12 and 13 May in Accra, Ghana.

== Results ==
=== Heats ===
First 3 of each heat (Q) and the next 2 fastest (q) qualified for the final.
Wind:NWI

Rank	Heat	Athlete	Nationality	Time	Notes
1	2	Tobi Amusan	Nigeria	12.81	Q
2	2	Ashley Miller	Zimbabwe	13.12	Q
3	2	Sidonie Fiadanantsoa	Madagascar	13.19	Q
4	2	Adaobi Tabugbo	Nigeria	13.22	q
5	1	Evonne Britton	Ghana	13.47	Q
6	1	Janet Deleme Sunday	Nigeria	13.71	Q
7	2	Safiétou Boye	Senegal	13.84	q
8	1	Sarah Koutouan	Ivory Coast	13.95	Q
9	2	Ayelech Alemu	Ethiopia	14.23	
10	1	Omnia Khaled	Egypt	14.28	
11	1	Derartu Anota	Ethiopia	14.74	
12	2	Emebet Teketel	Ethiopia	15.13	
	1	Galillée Boumpt	Republic of the Congo	DNS	

=== Final ===
Wind: -2.2 m/s

Rank	Heat	Athlete	Nationality	Time	Notes
1st place, gold medalist(s)	5	Tobi Amusan	Nigeria	12.84	
2nd place, silver medalist(s)	6	Ashley Miller	Zimbabwe	13.25	
3rd place, bronze medalist(s)	7	Adaobi Tabugbo	Nigeria	13.27	
4	3	Evonne Britton	Ghana	13.43	
5	4	Sidonie Fiadanantsoa	Madagascar	13.50	
6	2	Janet Deleme Sunday	Nigeria	13.78	
7	8	Safiétou Boye	Senegal	13.90	
8	1	Sarah Koutouan	Ivory Coast	19.21	
