= Athletics at the 2023 African Games – Women's 100 metres hurdles =

The women's 100 metres hurdles event at the 2023 African Games was held on 19 and 20 March 2024 in Accra, Ghana.

== Medalists ==
Gold	Silver	Bronze
Tobi Amusan; Nigeria	Sidonie Fiadanantsoa; Madagascar	Ashley Miller; Zimbabwe

== Results ==
=== Heats ===
Held on 19 March
Qualification: First 3 in each heat (Q) and the next 2 fastest (q) advanced to the final.

Wind:
Heat 1: -2.0 m/s, Heat 2: -1.8 m/s

Rank	Heat	Name	Nationality	Time	Notes
1	2	Tobi Amusan	Nigeria	13.03	Q
2	1	Sidonie Fiadanantsoa	Madagascar	13.19	Q
3	1	Faith Osamuyi	Nigeria	13.55	Q
4	2	Cecilia Guambe	Mozambique	14.00	Q, NR
5	2	Ashley Miller	Zimbabwe	14.11	Q
6	1	Rukia Omulisia	Kenya	14.31	Q
7	2	Naomi Akakpo	Togo	14.39	q
8	1	Madina Touré	Burkina Faso	14.76	q
9	1	Tigist Ayana	Ethiopia	14.94	
10	1	Emebet Teketel	Ethiopia	14.97	
11	2	Stella Ayanleke	Nigeria	15.09	
12	2	Meskerem Gizaw	Ethiopia	15.24	
13	1	Carolina Yomengue	Angola	16.89	
14	2	Doris Mensah	Ghana	16.89	

=== Final ===
Held on 20 March
Wind: -2.1 m/s

Rank	Lane	Name	Nationality	Time	Notes
1st place, gold medalist(s)	6	Tobi Amusan	Nigeria	12.89	WL
2nd place, silver medalist(s)	4	Sidonie Fiadanantsoa	Madagascar	13.19	
3rd place, bronze medalist(s)	8	Ashley Miller	Zimbabwe	13.59	
4	5	Faith Osamuyi	Nigeria	13.77	
5	7	Cecilia Guambe	Mozambique	14.00	=NR
6	3	Rukia Omulisia	Kenya	14.00	
7	9	Naomi Akakpo	Togo	14.17	
8	2	Madina Touré	Burkina Faso	14.85	
