= Natalia Christofi =

Cypriot athlete (born 1997)

Personal information
- Nationality: Cyprus
- Born: 10 February 1997 (age 29)

Sport
- Sport: Athletics
- Event: 100m hurdles

Achievements and titles
- Personal best(s): 60m hurdles 7.92s (Luxembourg, 2023); 100m hurdles: 12.84s (Chorzów, 2023)

Natalia Christofi (Greek: Ναταλία Χριστοφή; born 10 February 1997) is a Cypriot track and field athlete. She is a multiple time national champion over 100 metres hurdles. She competed at the 2023 World Athletics Championships.

== Career ==
In 2017, Christofi competed at the 2017 European Athletics U23 Championships in the 100 metres hurdles, qualifying for the semi-finals in Bydgoszcz, Poland.

In August 2018, Christofi made her senior European Championship debut, running 13.53 seconds in the 100m hurdles in Berlin.

In 2022, she lowered the Cypriot national record over 60 metres hurdles to 8.10 seconds in winning the silver medal at the Balkan Athletics Indoor Championships. After overcoming a leg injury, she was later selected for the 2022 European Athletics Championships in Munich. She later competed in the 100 metres hurdles at the 2022 Commonwealth Games held in Birmingham in August 2023.

In January 2023, Christofi broke the eight-second barrier for the 60 metres for the first time, running 7.92 seconds in Luxembourg.

In June 2023, she set a new national record for the 100m hurdles of 13.01 seconds to win gold at the Games of the Small States. That month, Christofi lowered her own national record for the 100 metres hurdles to 12.84 seconds, in Chorzów, Poland. In August 2023, she competed at the 2023 World Athletics Championships in Budapest and qualified for the semi-finals, running 12.90 seconds.

In May 2024, she won the gold medal in the 100 metres hurdles at the Balkan Athletics Championships.
