= Megan Simmonds =

Jamaican hurdler

Megan Simmonds (formerly Megan Tapper)
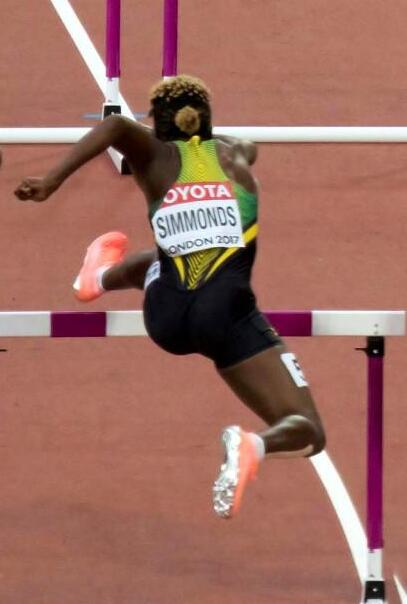

Personal information
- Born: Megan Simmonds; 18 March 1994 (age 32) Kingston, Jamaica
- Height: 5 ft 2 in (157 cm)
- Weight: 49 kg (108 lb)

Sport
- Sport: Athletics
- Event: 100 metres hurdles
- College team: University of Technology, Jamaica
- Club: MVP Track Club; Elite Performance
- Coached by: Stephen Francis; Reynaldo Walcott; Lonnie Green

Achievements and titles
- Personal bests: 60 mh 7.82 (Torun, 2026); 100 mh 12.34 (Kingston, 2025)
Medal record
Representing Jamaica
Olympic Games
Bronze medal – third place	2020 Tokyo	100 m hurdles
Diamond League
Third place	2026 Brussels	100 mh
Third place	2021 Zurich	100 mh
Commonwealth Games
Silver medal – second place	2026 Glasgow	100 m hurdles
Pan American Games
Bronze medal – third place	2019 Lima	100 m hurdles
NACAC Championships
Silver medal – second place	2022 Freeport	100 m hurdles
Bronze medal – third place	2022 Freeport	4×100 m relay
NACAC U23 Championships
Silver medal – second place	2014 Kamloops	100 m hurdles
Bronze medal – third place	2014 Kamloops	4×100 m relay

Megan Simmonds (formerly Megan Tapper, born 18 March 1994) is a Jamaican athlete competing in the sprint hurdles. She is an Olympic bronze medalist.

== Career ==
She represented her country at the 2016 Summer Olympics reaching the semifinals. She also represented her country in the 2017 World Athletics Championships in London, where she made it to the semi-finals. In 2018, she competed at the 2018 Commonwealth Games finishing 7th in the final. In 2019, she was a member of the Jamaican shuttle hurdles relay in Yokohama, Japan as well as the team in Doha, Qatar at the 2019 IAAF World Championships where she made the final in the 100m hurdles.

She was chosen to represent Jamaica at the 2020 Summer Olympics where she won a bronze medal in 12.55s.

Her personal best in the 100 metres hurdles is 12.34 seconds set in Kingston in 2025 at the JAAA National Senior Championships. Later in the season at the Monaco Diamond League, she equaled that 12.34 PB winning her first DL race.

At the 2026 Shanghai Diamond League, she finished 4th in 100 metres hurdles in 12.73s.

== Statistics ==
=== Circuit performances ===
Grand Slam Track results
Slam	Race group	Event	Pl.	Time	Prize money
2025 Miami Slam	Short hurdles	100 m hurdles	5th	12.50	US$30,000
2025 Miami Slam	Short hurdles	100 m	2nd	11.33	US$30,000
2025 Philadelphia Slam	Short hurdles	100 m hurdles	3rd	12.66	US$25,000
2025 Philadelphia Slam	Short hurdles	100 m	6th	11.52	US$25,000

=== International competitions ===
Year	Competition	Venue	Position	Event	Notes
Representing Jamaica
2010	CARIFTA Games (U17)	Port of Spain, Trinidad and Tobago	1st	100 m hurdles (76.2 cm)	13.64 (w)
2010	Central American and Caribbean; Junior Championships (U17)	Santo Domingo, Dominican Republic	1st	100 m hurdles (76.2 cm)	14.32
2010	Youth Olympic Games	Singapore	4th	100 m hurdles (76.2 cm)	13.62
2011	CARIFTA Games (U20)	Montego Bay, Jamaica	2nd (h)	100 m hurdles	13.82 (w)^{1}
2011	World Youth Championships	Lille, France	6th	100 m hurdles (76.2 cm)	13.78
2013	CARIFTA Games (U20)	Port of Spain, Trinidad and Tobago	1st	100 m hurdles	13.89
2014	NACAC U23 Championships	Kamloops, Canada	2nd	100 m hurdles	13.06 (w)
2014	NACAC U23 Championships	Kamloops, Canada	3rd	4 × 100 m relay	45.90
2016	Olympic Games	Rio de Janeiro, Brazil	14th (sf)	100 m hurdles	12.95
2017	World Championships	London, United Kingdom	11th (sf)	100 m hurdles	12.93
2018	Commonwealth Games	Gold Coast, Australia	7th	100 m hurdles	13.18
2019	Pan American Games	Lima, Peru	3rd	100 m hurdles	13.01
2019	World Championships	Doha, Qatar	5th (sf)	100 m hurdles	12.61^{1}
2021	Olympic Games	Tokyo, Japan	3rd	100 m hurdles	12.55
2022	World Championships	Eugene, United States	9th (sf)	100 m hurdles	12.52
2022	NACAC Championships	Freeport, Bahamas	2nd	100 m hurdles	12.68
2022	NACAC Championships	Freeport, Bahamas	3rd	4 × 100 m relay	43.49
2023	World Championships	Budapest, Hungary	7th (sf)	100 m hurdles	12.55
2024	World Indoor Championships	Glasgow, United Kingdom	11th (sf)	60 m hurdles	8.00
2026	World Indoor Championships	Toruń, Poland	5th	60 m hurdles	7.82
2026	Commonwealth Games	Glasgow, United Kingdom	2nd	100 m hurdles	12.41 (w)
2026	World Ultimate Championship	Budapest, Hungary	5th	100 m hurdles	12.42

^{1}Did not finish in the final
