= Naomi Akakpo =

Togolese hurdler (born 2000)

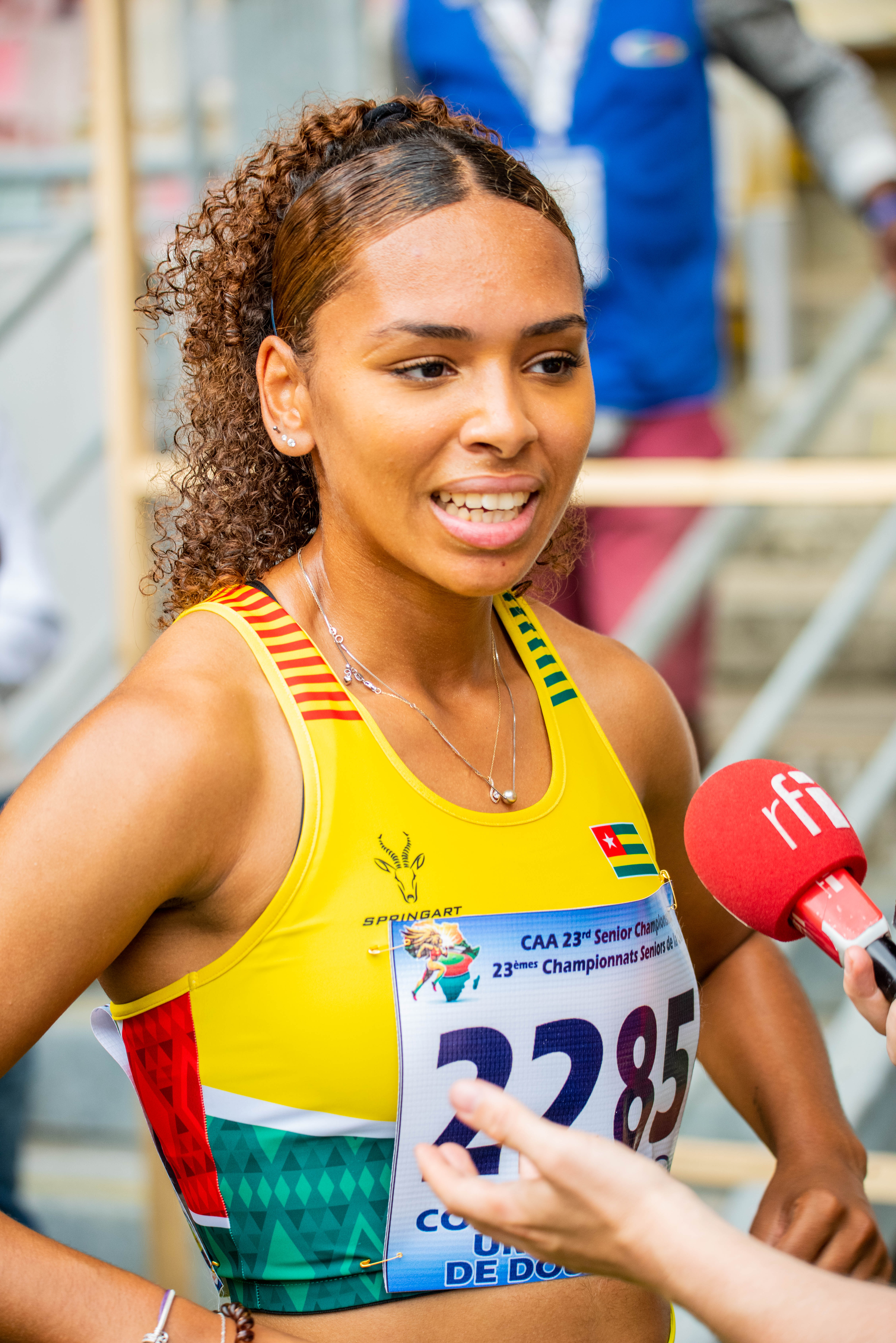

Personal information
- Full name: Naomi Akossiwa Elise Akakpo
- Born: December 17, 2000 (age 25) Paris, France

Sport
- Country: Togo
- Event: 100 m hurdles
Medal record
Women's athletics
Representing Togo
Islamic Solidarity Games
Silver medal – second place	2021 Konya	100 m hurdles
Bronze medal – third place	2025 Riyadh	100 m hurdles

Naomi Akossiwa Elise Akakpo (born December 17, 2000) is a French-Togolese hurdler. She has represented Togo in hurdling since 2022. She specializes in the 100 m hurdles. She holds the women's Togolese record for fastest 100 m hurdles.

== Career ==
Akakpo gained her first international experience in 2022, when she started at the World Championships in Eugene thanks to a wild card for Togo in 100 metres hurdles and lost there in the first round with 13.64 s.

She represented Togo in the women's 100 meters event at the 2023 African Games. Her time of 14.39 seconds finished in seventh place.

Akakpo was one of five Togolese athletes who competed in the 2024 Summer Olympics and, together with Eloi Adjavon, was one of the flag bearers for her country in the opening ceremony. She represented Togo in the women's 100 meters event and ran a personal best time of 12.34 seconds during the preliminary round. Akakpo placed fifth in her heat and did not progress further in the event, finishing 19th overall.

She competed in the women's 100 meters event in the 2024 African Championships, finishing in 10th place with 14.39 s.

== Medals ==
- Silver medal at the 2021 Islamic Solidarity Games in women's 100 m hurdles
- Silver medal at 2023 the West African Championships in women's 100 m hurdles
