= Celeste Mucci =

Australian sprinter and hurdler

Personal information
- Nationality: Australian
- Born: 11 August 1999 (age 26)
- Height: 1.74 m (5 ft 9 in)

Sport
- Sport: Athletics
- Event(s): Sprinting, Hurdles, Heptathlon

Celeste Mucci (born 11 August 1999) is an Australian athlete. She was fourth in the women's heptathlon at the 2018 Commonwealth Games held in April in Brisbane, Australia, and was fifth in the women's heptathlon at the July 2018 IAAF World U20 Championships held in the Ratinan Stadion, Tampere, Finland. Mucci won the Australian national championships in heptathlon in 2018 and 2019.

Mucci was part of the Australian team which won the women's 4 × 100 m relay at the 2019 Oceania Athletics Championships and competed in the women's 4 × 100 metres relay event at the 2019 World Athletics Championships. She was the 2019 Australian women's 100m hurdles champion.

Mucci won the 100m hurdles at the 2022 Oceania Championships held in June and finished seventh in the women's 100 metres hurdles at the 2022 Commonwealth Games held in August in Birmingham, England.
