= Tobi Amusan =

Nigerian sprinter and hurdler (born 1997)

Tobi Amusan OON
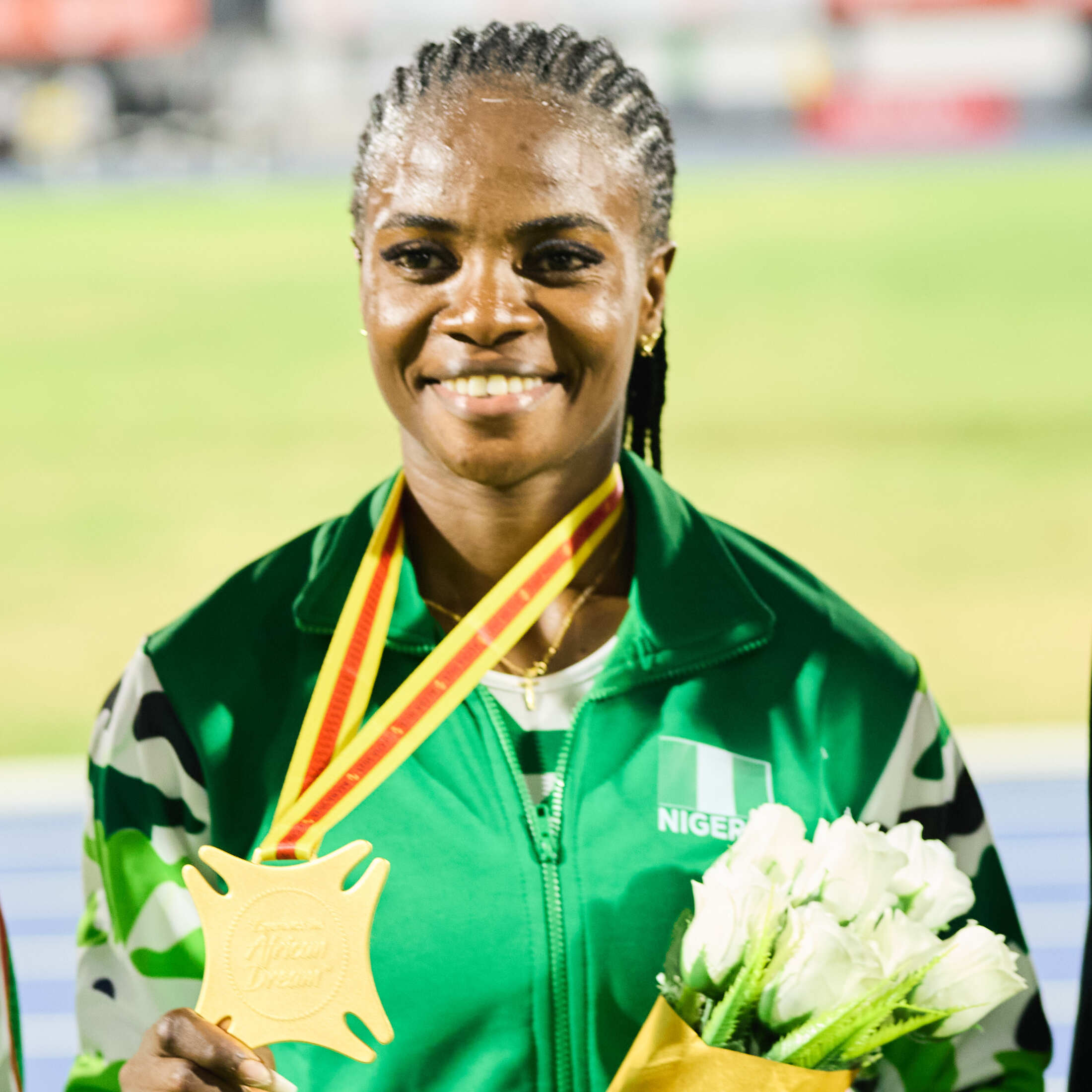
- Amusan at the 2023 African Games

Personal information
- Nickname: Tobi Express
- Born: Olúwatóbilọ́ba Ayọ̀mídé Amúsàn; 23 April 1997 (age 29) Ijebu Ode, Nigeria
- Education: University of Texas at El Paso; Our Lady of Apostles Secondary School, Ijebu-Ode
- Height: 1.70 m (5 ft 7 in)
- Weight: 55 kg (121 lb)

Sport
- Country: Nigeria
- Sport: Athletics
- Sprint: 100 metres hurdles
- College team: UTEP Miners
- Club: Buka Tigers
- Coached by: Lacena Golding-Clarke Mika Laaksonen Solaja Ayodele, Buka Tigers Coach

Achievements and titles
- Highest world ranking: 1 (2023)
- Personal bests: 60 m H: 7.75 (Boston 2024); 100 m: 11.10 (Florida 2023); 200 m: 22.66 (Albuquerque 2022); 100 m H: 12.12 AR (Eugene 2022)
Medal record
Women's Athletics
Representing Nigeria
World Championships
Gold medal – first place	2022 Eugene	100 m hurdles
Silver medal – second place	2025 Tokyo	100 m hurdles
World Ultimate Championship
Second place	2026 Budapest	100 m hurdles
Diamond League
First place	2021	100 m hurdles
First place	2022	100 m hurdles
First place	2023	100 m hurdles
Commonwealth Games
Gold medal – first place	2018 Gold Coast	100 m hurdles
Gold medal – first place	2022 Birmingham	100 m hurdles
Bronze medal – third place	2018 Gold Coast	4 × 100 m relay
Bronze medal – third place	2026 Glasgow	100 m hurdles
African Games
Gold medal – first place	2015 Brazzaville	100 m hurdles
Gold medal – first place	2019 Rabat	100 m hurdles
Gold medal – first place	2023 Accra	100 m hurdles
Gold medal – first place	2023 Accra	4 × 100 m relay
African Championships
Gold medal – first place	2018 Asaba	100 m hurdles
Gold medal – first place	2018 Asaba	4 × 100 m relay
Gold medal – first place	2022 Mauritius	100 m hurdles
Gold medal – first place	2022 Mauritius	4 × 100 m relay
Gold medal – first place	2024 Douala	4 × 100 m relay
Gold medal – first place	2026 Accra	100 m hurdles
African Junior Championships
Gold medal – first place	2015 Addis Ababa	100 m hurdles
African Youth Games
Silver medal – second place	2014 Gaborone	100 m hurdles
African Youth Championships
Silver medal – second place	2013 Warri	200 m

Oluwatobiloba Ayomide "Tobi" Amusan OON // (born 23 April 1997) is a Nigerian track and field athlete who specialises in the 100 metres hurdles and also competes as a sprinter. Amusan was the world record holder in the 100 metres hurdles with a time of 12.12 seconds, between July 2022 and August 2026. She is the former Commonwealth champion and current African champion in the 100 m hurdles, as well as the meet record holder in those two competitions. Amusan became the first ever Nigerian world champion and world record holder in an athletics event when she won the 2022 World Championships 100 m hurdles gold medal, setting a world record of 12.12 seconds (+0.9 m/s) in the semi-final, followed up by a 12.06 seconds (+2.5 m/s) in the final. She won back-to-back Commonwealth and African titles in 2018 and 2022 in the 100 m hurdles and is also a two-time African Games champion.

In 2015, Amusan took gold in the 100 m hurdles at the African Junior Championships and the same year, as an 18-year-old, secured her first title at the African Games. In 2021, Amusan became the first Nigerian athlete to win a Diamond League title as she took the 100 m hurdles trophy, breaking the then-African record held by Glory Alozie in the process. She retained her title in 2022 and 2023.

== Early life and education ==
Tobi Amusan was born on 23 April 1997, in Ijebu Ode, Ogun State, Nigeria, to Mr and Mrs Amusan, who are both school teachers. Tobi, as she is fondly called, is the youngest of three children. She attended Our Lady of Apostles Secondary School in her hometown. In May 2023, Amusan earned Master of Arts degree in Leadership Studies and Sports Management at the University of Texas at El Paso, United States.

== Career ==
From an early age, Amusan was an accomplished athlete. She was the 200 metres silver medallist at the 2013 African Youth Championships held in Warri. A year later, she took her first major medal in the 100 metres hurdles, which was also silver, at the African Youth Games. She then claimed gold in the event at the 2015 African Junior Athletics Championships in Addis Ababa. Also in 2015, while competing in the All-Africa Games as an eighteen-year-old, she won the gold medal in the 100 m hurdles.

=== 2016 ===
In 2016, as a freshman at the University of Texas at El Paso (UTEP), Amusan became the second athlete for the university to be named C-USA Female Track Athlete of the Year since UTEP joined C-USA. She was the gold medallist in both the 100 m hurdles and the 200 m. She also claimed a silver in the long jump at the C-USA Championships. Amusan first broke the 13 s barrier in the hurdles with a time of 12.83 s at the El Paso UTEP Invitational. This eclipsed Kim Turner's UTEP record, which had stood for 33 years. She was runner-up at the 2016 NCAA Outdoor Championships in the 100 m hurdles. She ran a windy 12.79 s behind Kentucky's Jasmine Camacho-Quinn. Amusan also competed at the 2016 World Junior Championships in Bydgoszcz, Poland. Despite running her second-fastest time ever, she placed fifth in the final. She went on to represent Nigeria at the Rio Olympic Games, reaching the semifinals of the 100 m hurdles.

=== 2017 ===
In her first outdoor race of 2017, she ran a then-lifetime best and UTEP record of 12.63 s in the 100 m hurdles. She was the C-USA champion in her specialist event and also the runner up in the 200 m. At the 2017 NCAA Outdoor Championships, there was a reversal of finishes in the 100 m hurdles. In a dramatic race, Amusan claimed the title ahead of Camacho-Quinn, the previous year's champion. She did this in a personal record time of 12.57 s. She also represented Nigeria at the World Championships in London later in the year.

=== 2018: Commonwealth and African champion ===
Amusan ran a personal best of 7.89 s in the 60 m hurdles at the start of her 2018 season. She represented her country at the Birmingham World Indoor Championships, reaching the final in the event.

At the 2018 Commonwealth Games in Gold Coast, Australia, 2015 world champion Danielle Williams seemed to be the favourite to take the title in the absence of Sally Pearson. In the final, however, Amusan moved ahead of her competitors and won the race by a clear metre ahead of Williams. She also won a bronze medal in the 4 × 100 m relay with her teammates, Joy Udo-Gabriel, Blessing Okagbare and Rosemary Chukwuma. Later in the year, she won her first African Championship title in her signature event at the Asaba African Championships. This fulfilled a Nigerian tradition being 11th gold for Nigeria in the 100 m hurdles since Judy Bell-Gam triumphed at the inaugural edition of the championships in 1979. She also claimed a gold medal in the 4 × 100 m relay at the championships.

=== 2019: Second African Games title ===
The 22-year-old successfully defended her African Games title in August. On 5 October at the World Championships in Doha, Qatar, she ran a personal best of 12.48 s during the 100 m hurdles qualifying rounds. In the semi-finals the following day, she equaled this personal best before placing fourth a few hours later in the final with a time of 12.49 s.

=== 2021: First Nigerian Diamond League champion ===
Amusan finished fourth at the delayed 2020 Tokyo Olympics with a time of 12.60 s. She later competed in the Zürich Diamond League final event, which she won in a new African record of 12.42 s, breaking 23-years-old best of 12.44 s held by her compatriot Glory Alozie and becoming the first Nigerian to win a Diamond League trophy.

=== 2022: World, Commonwealth, African and Diamond League champion ===
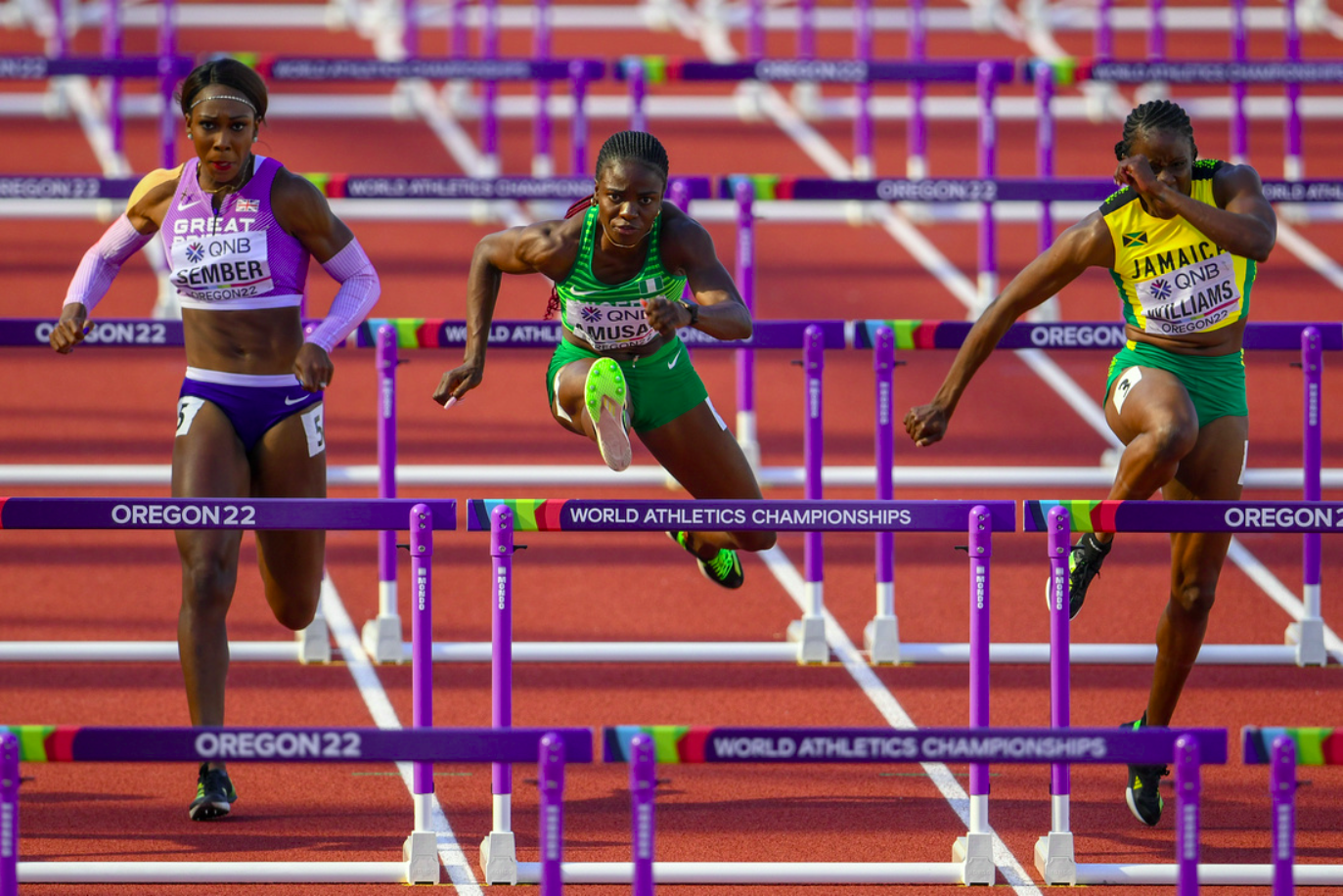
Tobi Amusan races in the 100 m hurdles final at the 2022 World Championships in Eugene

In June, Amusan defended her 100 m hurdles title at the African Championships in Mauritius with a time of 12.57 s. She also competed in the women's 4 × 100 m relay to earn a second gold medal. The same month, she lowered her African record in her specialist event with a 12.41 s clocking when winning at the Diamond League meet in Paris.

The 25-year-old entered the World Championships held in Eugene, Oregon in July as a medal contender after back-to-back fourth-place finishes. In the heats, she again bettered her African record with a time of 12.40 s, improving by a further 0.01 s. In the semi-final, Amusan set a new world record of 12.12 seconds, breaking the previous best of 12.20 s set by American Kendra Harrison in 2016 and becoming the first Nigeria's world record holder in an athletics event. It was the largest improvement for a world record in the 100 m hurdles in 42 years. She bested her time once again in the final, running 12.06 s (2.5 m/s wind assisted, thus not a legal WR), becoming the first Nigerian world champion at the World Athletics Championships.

In August at the Commonwealth Games in Birmingham, Amusan successfully defended her title, winning her second consecutive gold medal in the 100 m hurdles with a new Games record of 12.30 s. She also helped power Nigeria's women's 4 × 100 m relay team to gold. She competed in her specialist event at the Lausanne Diamond Race meet later that month, finishing second with a time of 12.60 s, behind reigning Olympic champion Jasmine Camacho-Quinn. Amusan wrapped up her long and successful 2022 campaign by winning 100 m hurdles at the Zürich Diamond League final event with a 12.29 s performance to retain her title. She finished ahead of 2–4, Tia Jones, Britany Anderson, and Camacho-Quinn, setting a new meet record in the process.

=== 2023 ===
On 16 July 2023, Amusan clocked a new season best of 12.34 seconds in the 100 m Hurdles at the Silesia Diamond League meet. Three days later, Amusan was charged with missing three anti-doping controls and was given a provisional suspension from participation. On 17 August 2023, the Disciplinary Tribunal found that Amusan had not committed an Anti-Doping Rule Violation of three whereabouts failures within a 12-month period and her provisional suspension was lifted. CAS upheld the decision in 2024.

At the 2023 World Championships held in Budapest, she finished sixth in the final held on 24 August.

== Achievements ==
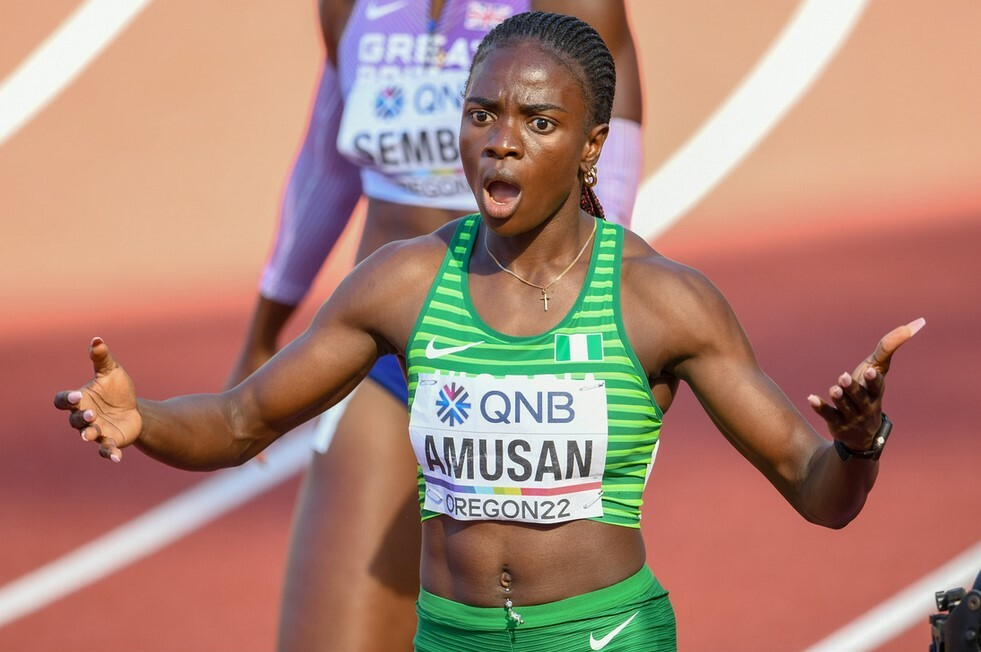
Amusan after her final victory at the 2022 World Championships in Eugene

=== International competitions ===
Representing Nigeria
Year	Competition	Venue	Position	Event	Result
2013	African Youth Championships	Warri, Nigeria	2nd	200 m	24.45
2013	African Youth Championships	Warri, Nigeria	3rd	Long jump	5.52 m
2013	World Youth Championships	Donetsk, Ukraine	— (sf)	200 m	DQ
2013	World Youth Championships	Donetsk, Ukraine	— (h)	Medley relay	DQ
2014	African Youth Games	Gaborone, Botswana	2nd	100 m hurdles	13.92
2014	World Junior Championships	Eugene, United States	— (h)	100 m hurdles	DNS
2015	African Junior Championships	Addis Ababa, Ethiopia	1st	100 m hurdles	14.26
2015	African Games	Brazzaville, Republic of Congo	1st	100 m hurdles	13.15
2016	World Junior Championships	Bydgoszcz, Poland	5th	100 m hurdles	12.95
2016	Olympic Games	Rio de Janeiro, Brazil	11th (sf)	100 m hurdles	12.91
2017	World Championships	London, United Kingdom	14th (sf)	100 m hurdles	13.04
2018	World Indoor Championships	Birmingham, United Kingdom	7th	60 m hurdles	8.05
2018	Commonwealth Games	Gold Coast, Australia	1st	100 m hurdles	12.68
2018	Commonwealth Games	Gold Coast, Australia	3rd	4 × 100 m relay	42.75
2018	African Championships	Asaba, Nigeria	1st	100 m hurdles	12.86
2018	African Championships	Asaba, Nigeria	1st	4 × 100 m relay	43.77
2018	Continental Cup	Ostrava, Czech Republic	5th	100 m hurdles	12.96
2018	Continental Cup	Ostrava, Czech Republic	— (f)	4 × 100 m relay	DQ 163.3(a)
2019	African Games	Rabat, Morocco	1st	100 m hurdles	12.68
2019	World Championships	Doha, Qatar	4th	100 m hurdles	12.49
2021	Olympic Games	Tokyo, Japan	4th	100 m hurdles	12.60
2021	Olympic Games	Tokyo, Japan	12th (h)	4 × 100 m relay	43.25
2022	African Championships	Port Louis, Mauritius	1st	100 m hurdles	12.57w
2022	African Championships	Port Louis, Mauritius	1st	4 × 100 m relay	44.45
2022	World Championships	Eugene, United States	1st	100 m hurdles	12.06w (WR sf)
2022	Commonwealth Games	Birmingham, United Kingdom	1st	100 m hurdles	12.30 GR
2022	Commonwealth Games	Birmingham, United Kingdom	DQ	4 × 100 m relay	~~42.10 AR~~
2023	World Championships	Budapest, Hungary	6th	100 m hurdles	12.62
2024	African Games	Accra, Ghana	1st	100 m hurdles	12.89
2024	African Games	Accra, Ghana	1st	4 × 100 m relay	43.05
2024	Olympic Games	Paris, France	9th (sf)	100 m hurdles	12.55
2025	World Championships	Tokyo, Japan	2nd	100 m hurdles	12.29
2026	African Championships	Accra, Ghana	1st	100 m hurdles	13.73
2026	Commonwealth Games	Glasgow, United Kingdom	3rd	100 m hurdles	12.60 (w)
2026	World Ultimate Championship	Budapest, Hungary	2nd	100 m hurdles	12.34

=== Circuit win and titles ===
- Diamond League
  - 100 m hurdles champion (3): 2021, 2022, 2023
  - 100 m hurdles wins, times (in seconds) specified in parentheses:
    - 2021 (1): Zürich Weltklasse (12.42 AR)
    - 2022 (2): Paris Meeting (12.41 AR), Zürich (12.29 MR)
    - 2023 (3): Stockholm Bauhaus-galan (12.52), Silesia Kamila Skolimowska Memorial (12.34 =MR), Eugene Prefontaine Classic (12.33)

=== National and NCAA titles ===
- Nigerian Championships
  - 100 m hurdles: 2021, 2022
  - 4 × 100 m relay: 2022
- NCAA Division I Women's Outdoor Track and Field Championships
  - 100 m hurdles: 2017

=== Personal bests ===
Event	Time	Wind	Place	Date	Notes
60 metres indoor	7.41		Albuquerque, United States	2 February 2019	
60 metres hurdles	7.75		Boston, United States	4 February 2024	African record
100 metres	11.14	±0.0 m/s	Albuquerque, United States	21 April 2022	
200 metres	22.66	−1.1 m/s	Albuquerque, United States	21 April 2022	
200 metres indoor	23.35		Birmingham, United States	19 February 2017	
100 metres hurdles	12.12	+0.9 m/s	Eugene, United States	24 July 2022	African record, former world record
100 metres hurdles	12.06w	+2.5 m/s	Eugene, United States	24 July 2022	not legal
4 × 100 m relay	42.10		Birmingham, United Kingdom	7 August 2022	African record
Long jump	6.07 m	+1.7 m/s	Berkeley, United States	23 April 2016	
Long jump indoor	6.15 m		Albuquerque, United States	3 February 2017	

View chart definition.

== Awards and honours ==
2022

- Confederation of African Athletics Female Athlete of the Year

== See also ==
- List of African Games medalists in athletics (women)
- List of Commonwealth Games medallists in athletics (women)

Olympic Games
Preceded by Seun Adigun	Flag bearer for Nigeria; Paris 2024 with Anuoluwapo Juwon Opeyori	Succeeded by Incumbent
Records
Preceded by (United States) Kendra Harrison	Women's 100 m hurdles world record holder July 24, 2022 – August 27, 2026	Succeeded by (United States) Masai Russell
