= Dominica at the World Athletics Championships =

- Flag of Dominica
- WA code: DMA
- Medals: Gold 0 Silver 1 Bronze 1 Total 2

World Athletics Championships appearances (overview)
- 1987; 1991; 1993; 1995; 1997; 1999; 2001; 2003; 2005; 2007; 2009; 2011; 2013; 2015; 2017; 2019; 2022; 2023; 2025

Dominica has taken part in all editions of the World Athletics Championships except for the first one, having won 2 medals so far. Jérôme Romain was the first dominican athlete to step in the podium, when he achieved a third place finish at 1995 World Athletics Championships in the men's triple jump. Twenty years later, Paris 2024 Olympic champion Thea LaFond won the silver medal in the women's triple jump at the 2025 World Athletics Championships, one year after becoming the first dominican sportperson to achieve a medal at the Olympic Games.

== Medalists ==
Medal	Name	Year	Event
Bronze	Jérôme Romain	1995 Gothenburg	Men's triple jump
Silver	Thea LaFond	2025 Tokyo	Women's triple jump

=== By event ===
Event	Gold	Silver	Bronze	Total
Triple jump	0	1	1	2
Totals (1 entries)	0	1	1	2

=== By gender ===
Gender	Gold	Silver	Bronze	Total
Women	0	1	0	1
Men	0	0	1	1

== See also ==
- Dominica at the Olympics
- Dominica at the Paralympics
