= List of flag bearers for Dominica at the Olympics =

Dominica at the Olympics
- IOC code: DMA
- NOC: Dominica Olympic Committee
- Website: www.doc.dm
- Medals: Gold 1 Silver 0 Bronze 0 Total 1

Summer appearances
- 1996; 2000; 2004; 2008; 2012; 2016; 2020; 2024

Winter appearances
- 2014; 2018–2026

This is a list of flag bearers who have represented Dominica at the Olympics.

Flag bearers carry the national flag of their country at the opening ceremony of the Olympic Games.

#	Event year	Season	Flag bearer	Sport
1	1996	Summer	Jérôme Romain	Athletics
2	2000	Summer	Marcia Daniel	Athletics
3	2004	Summer	Chris Lloyd	Athletics
4	2008	Summer	Jérôme Romain	Athletics (coach)
5	2012	Summer	Erison Hurtault	Athletics
6	2014	Winter	Gary di Silvestri	Cross-country skiing
7	2016	Summer	Yordanys Durañona	Athletics
8	2020	Summer	Thea LaFond	Athletics
8	2020	Summer	Dennick Luke	Athletics
9	2024	Summer	Thea LaFond	Athletics
9	2024	Summer	Dennick Luke	Athletics

== See also ==
- Dominica at the Olympics
