= Dominica at the 2025 World Athletics Championships =

- Flag of Dominica
- WA code: DMA

in Tokyo, Japan 13 September 2025 – 21 September 2025
- Competitors: 3 (1 man and 2 women)
- Medals Ranked 27th: Gold 0 Silver 1 Bronze 0 Total 1

World Athletics Championships appearances (overview)
- 1987; 1991; 1993; 1995; 1997; 1999; 2001; 2003; 2005; 2007; 2009; 2011; 2013; 2015; 2017; 2019; 2022; 2023; 2025

Dominica competed at the 2025 World Athletics Championships in Tokyo, Japan, from 13 to 21 September 2025.

== Medallists ==
Medal	Athlete	Event	Date
Silver	Thea LaFond	Women's triple jump	September 18

== Results ==
Dominica entered 3 athletes.

Key

- Q = Qualified for the next round
- q = Qualified for the next round as a fastest loser or, in field events, by position without achieving the qualifying target
- NR = National record
- PB = Personal best
- SB = Season best
- N/A = Round not applicable for the event

=== Men ===
Track and road events

Athlete	Event	Heat		Semifinal		Final	
Athlete	Event	Result	Rank	Result	Rank	Result	Rank
Dennick Luke	400 metres hurdles	49.32	8	Did not advance			

=== Women ===
Field events

Athlete	Event	Qualification		Final	
Athlete	Event	Distance	Position	Distance	Position
Thea Lafond	Triple jump	14.40	4 Q	14.89 SB	2nd place, silver medalist(s)
Treneese Hamilton	Shot put	17.68	19	Did not advance	
