= List of Dominica records in athletics =

The following are the national records in athletics in the Commonwealth of Dominica maintained by Dominica's national athletics federation: Dominica Athletics Association (DAA).

== Outdoor ==
Key to tables: Awaiting ratification Record not kept by DAAA Not ratified or later rescinded by DAAA

=== Men ===
| Event | Record | Athlete | Date | Meet | Place | Ref. |
|---|---|---|---|---|---|---|
| 100 m | 10.33 (+1.9 m/s) | Chris Lloyd | 3 May 2008 | | Houston, United States | |
| 200 m | 20.31 (+1.6 m/s) | Chris Lloyd | 3 May 2008 | | Houston, United States | |
| 400 m | 45.31 | Bruce Phillip | 1 June 1989 | | Provo, United States | |
| 800 m | 1:46.81 | Dennick Luke | 7 August 2024 | Olympic Games | Paris, France | |
| 1500 m | 3:36.60 | Steve Agar | 2 June 1996 | | Abbotsford, Canada | |
| 3000 m | 7:56.34 | Steve Agar | 16 May 1998 | | Stanford, United States | |
| 5000 m | 13:35.86 | Steve Agar | 18 April 1998 | Mt. SAC Relays | Walnut, United States | |
| 10,000 m | 31:53.3 | Steve Agar | 16 April 1989 | | St George's, Grenada | |
| 10 km (road) | 29:36 | Steve Agar | 29 October 1995 | | Ottawa, Canada | |
| Marathon | 3:18:24 | Lindson Lynch | 29 July 2006 | Central American and Caribbean Games | Cartagena, Colombia | |
| 110 m hurdles | 17.93 | Andy Baron | 19 July 2003 | | Bridgetown, Barbados | |
| 110 m hurdles | 14.04 | Felix Lawrence | 31 May 2019 | NJSIAA Group Championship | Somerset, United States | |
| 400 m hurdles | 54.23 | Mitchel Davis | 1 June 2013 | | Kingston, Jamaica | |
| 400 m hurdles | 52.12 | Felix Lawrence | 30 May 2019 | NJSIAA Group Championship | Somerset, United States | |
| 3000 m steeplechase | 9:29.10 | Neehall Philogene | 1 May 1999 | | St. Charles, United States | |
| High jump | 2.25 m | Brendan Williams | 17 March 2012 | Torneo José Godoy | Havana, Cuba | |
| Pole vault | 2.90 m | Andy Baron | 19 July 2003 | | Bridgetown, Barbados | |
| Long jump | 8.08 m (+1.3 m/s) | Tristan James | 29 May 2022 | USATF San Diego-Imperial Association Championships | Chula Vista, United States | |
| Triple jump | 17.48 m (+1.6 m/s) | Jérôme Romain | 5 August 1995 | World Championships | Gothenburg, Sweden | |
| Shot put | 19.87 m | Dillon Simon | 18 April 2015 | Virginia Challenge | Charlottesville, United States | |
| Discus throw | 60.13 m | Dillon Simon | 21 March 2015 | Wake Forest Open | Winston-Salem, United States | |
| Hammer throw | 56.12 m | Gracien Jules | 22 April 2022 | Illini Invitational | Champaign, United States | |
| Javelin throw | 67.34 m | Andre Bazil | 17 April 2016 | Copa Puebla | Puebla City, Mexico | |
| Decathlon | | | | | | |
| Decathlon | 100m (wind) / Long jump (wind) / Shot put / High jump / 400m / 110m H (wind) / Discus / Pole vault / Javelin / 1500m | | | | | |
| 20 km walk (road) | 2:03:30 | Albert Turlet | 9 November 2019 | Meeting d'Autome de Nogent | Nogent-sur-Marne, France | |
| 35 km walk (road) | 4:03:52 | Albert Turlet | 3 October 2021 | NK 50 km | Tilburg, Netherlands | |
| 50 km walk (road) | 5:45:19 | Albert Turlet | 24 November 2019 | Les 8 Heures d'Étampes-sur-Marne | Étampes-sur-Marne, France | |
| 4 × 100 m relay | 40.48 | Dominica; Fabian Florent; Sherwin James; Chris Lloyd; Kenneth John | 5 July 2003 | Central American and Caribbean Championships | St. George's, Grenada | |
| 4 × 400 m relay | 3:11.06 | Dominica; Joseph Bazil; Erison Hurtault; Tyron Benjamin; Chris Lloyd | 6 July 2008 | Central American and Caribbean Championships | Cali, Colombia | |

=== Women ===
| Event | Record | Athlete | Date | Meet | Place | Ref. |
|---|---|---|---|---|---|---|
| 100 m | 11.29 | Hermin Joseph | 23 August 1994 | Commonwealth Games | Victoria, Canada | |
| 200 m | 23.58 | Hermin Joseph | 28 May 1994 | | Raleigh, United States | |
| 400 m | 53.40 | Dawn Williams | 13 April 1996 | | Jonesboro, United States | |
| 800 m | 1:59.06 | Dawn Williams | 27 July 1996 | Olympic Games | Atlanta, United States | |
| 1500 m | 4:42.00 | Dawn Williams | 1 May 1993 | | San Diego, United States | |
| 3000 m | 10:51.83 | Dawn Williams | 30 March 1986 | CARIFTA Games | Les Abymes, Guadeloupe | |
| 5000 m | | | | | | |
| 10,000 m | | | | | | |
| 15 km (road) | 2:00.33+ | Caryl Pierre | 1 November 2009 | New York City Marathon | New York City, United States | |
| 20 km (road) | 2:47.25+ | Caryl Pierre | 1 November 2009 | New York City Marathon | New York City, United States | |
| 25 km (road) | 3:36.23+ | Caryl Pierre | 1 November 2009 | New York City Marathon | New York City, United States | |
| 30 km (road) | 4:23.53+ | Caryl Pierre | 1 November 2009 | New York City Marathon | New York City, United States | |
| Marathon | 4:14:59 | Janelle Prevost | 12 April 2015 | Paris Marathon | Paris, France | |
| 100 m hurdles | 14.03 (+0.9 m/s) | Thea LaFond | 16 May 2015 | Big Ten Championships | East Lansing, United States | |
| 400 m hurdles | 1:09.1 h | Mindy Massicott | 18 March 2007 | Dominican Junior Championships | Portsmouth, United Kingdom | |
| 3000 m steeplechase | | | | | | |
| High jump | 1.85 m | Thea LaFond | 3 April 2015 | Florida Relays | Gainesville, United States | |
| Pole vault | | | | | | |
| Long jump | 6.64 m (+0.4 m/s) | Thea LaFond | 1 May 2022 | Grande Premio Internacional Brasil Loterias Caixa de Atletismo | São Paulo, Brazil | |
| Triple jump | 15.25 m (+1.8 m/s) | Thea LaFond | 26 June 2026 | Boris Hanžeković Memorial | Zagreb, Croatia | |
| Shot put | 16.48 m | Vannessa Henry | 14 April 2012 | Patriot Open Invitational | Fairfax, United States | |
| Discus throw | 45.85 m | Melissa Alfred | 23 March 2013 | | Les Abymes, Guadeloupe | |
| Hammer throw | | | | | | |
| Javelin throw | 46.72 m | Shanee Angol | 24 March 2018 | | Fayetteville, United States | |
| Javelin throw | 48.36 m (Note: ratified by DAAA but not recognised by World Athletics) | Lisa Casimir | 23 April 1992 | | Philadelphia, United States | |
| Heptathlon | 4817 pts | Chelsey Linton | 12–13 May 2017 | MVC Championships | Wichita, United States | |
| Heptathlon | 100m H (wind) / High jump / Shot put / 200m (wind) / Long jump (wind) / Javelin / 800m; 14.94 (+3.6 m/s) / 1.55 m / 12.10 m / 25.71 (+3.4 m/s) / 5.24 m (+3.9 m/s) / 32.50 m / 2:33.60 | | | | | |
| 20 km walk (road) | | | | | | |
| 50 km walk (road) | | | | | | |
| 4 × 100 m relay | 48.2 h | Dominica; Hermin Joseph; G. Thomas; Philogen Sharon; Claudia Charles | 24 May 1987 | | St. George's, Grenada | |
| 4 × 400 m relay | 4:06.4 h | Dominica; Claudia Charles; E. Joseph; O. Bonnie; Dawn Williams | 13 May 1990 | | Basseterre, Saint Kitts and Nevis | |

== Indoor ==
=== Men ===
| Event | Record | Athlete | Date | Meet | Place | Ref. |
|---|---|---|---|---|---|---|
| 60 m | 6.72 | Sherwin James | 7 March 2003 | | Moscow, United States | |
| 200 m | 21.27 | Chris Lloyd | 13 January 2006 | Arkansas Invitational | Fayetteville, United States | |
| 200 m | 20.73 OT | Chris Lloyd | 26 January 2007 | | Johnson City, United States | |
| 400 m | 46.02 | Chris Lloyd | 16 February 2008 | Aviva Indoor Grand Prix | Birmingham, United Kingdom | |
| 800 m | | | | | | |
| 1500 m | 3:42.34 | Steve Agar | 1 March 1997 | | Sindelfingen, Germany | |
| 3000 m | 7:56.44 | Steve Agar | 12 March 1993 | World Championships | Toronto, Canada | |
| 60 m hurdles | | | | | | |
| High jump | 2.15 m | Rupert Charles | 6 January 1984 | Cosford Games | Cosford, United Kingdom | |
| Pole vault | | | | | | |
| Long jump | 7.81 m | Jérôme Romain | 11 March 1994 | | Indianapolis, United States | |
| Triple jump | 17.03 m | Jérôme Romain | 6 February 1998 | | Budapest, Hungary | |
| Shot put | 19.30 m | Dillon Myron Simon | 1 March 2015 | Bosten University Last Chance Meet | Boston, United States | |
| Weight throw | 19.61 m | Dillon Myron Simon | 25 January 2014 | Wesley A. Brown Invitational | Annapolis, United States | |
| Heptathlon | | | | | | |
| Heptathlon | 60m / Long jump / Shot put / High jump / 60m H / Pole vault / 1000m | | | | | |
| 5000 m walk | | | | | | |
| 4 × 400 m relay | | | | | | |

=== Women ===
| Event | Record | Athlete | Date | Meet | Place | Ref. |
|---|---|---|---|---|---|---|
| 60 m | 7.99 | Catherine Stoute | 2 December 2006 | | Lewisburg, United States | |
| 200 m | | | | | | |
| 400 m | 54.32 | Dawn Williams-Sewer | 26 February 1996 | | United States | |
| 800 m | 2:02.55 | Dawn Williams-Sewer | 8 March 1997 | | Indianapolis, United States | |
| 1500 m | | | | | | |
| 3000 m | | | | | | |
| 60 m hurdles | 8.38 | Thea LaFond | 27 February 2015 | Big Ten Championships | Geneva, United States | |
| High jump | 1.85 m | Thea LaFond | 27 February 2014 | ACC Championships | Clemson, United States | |
| High jump | 1.85 m A | Thea LaFond | 14 March 2014 | NCAA Division I Championships | Albuquerque, United States | |
| Pole vault | | | | | | |
| Long jump | 6.17 m (Note: outdoor mark ratified as absolute record) | Thea LaFond | 27 February 2015 | Big Ten Championships | Geneva, United States | |
| Triple jump | 15.01 m (Note: outdoor mark ratified as absolute record) | Thea LaFond | 3 March 2024 | World Championships | Glasgow, United Kingdom | |
| Shot put | 16.50 m | Vannessa Henry | 20 January 2012 | Great Dane Classic | New York City, United States | |
| Weight throw | 19.73 m | Vannessa Henry | 20 January 2012 | Great Dane Classic | New York City, United States | |
| Pentathlon | 4222 pts | Thea LaFond | 27 February 2014 | ACC Championships | Clemson, United States | |
| Pentathlon | 60m H / High jump / Shot put / Long jump / 800m; 8.55 / 1.85 m / 9.97 m / 6.01 m / 2:22.13 | | | | | |
| 3000 m walk | | | | | | |
| 4 × 400 m relay | | | | | | |
