= Dominica at the 2024 Summer Olympics =

- IOC code: DMA
- NOC: Dominica Olympic Committee
- Website: www.doc.dm

in Paris, France 26 July 2024 – 11 August 2024
- Competitors: 4 (2 men and 2 women) in 2 sports
- Flag bearers (opening): Dennick Luke & Thea LaFond
- Flag bearer (closing): Thea LaFond
- Medals Ranked 62nd: Gold 1 Silver 0 Bronze 0 Total 1

Summer Olympics appearances (overview)
- 1996; 2000; 2004; 2008; 2012; 2016; 2020; 2024

Dominica competed at the 2024 Summer Olympics in Paris from 26 July to 11 August 2024. It was the nation's eighth consecutive appearance at the Summer Olympics after its debut at the 1996 Summer Olympics at Atlanta. The Dominican team consisted of four athletes — two men and two women — competing in two sports. Thea LaFond won the country's first Olympic medal, a gold, in the women's triple jump event on 3 August.

== Background ==
The Dominica Olympic Committee was established in 1986 and recognized by the International Olympic Committee in September 1993. The nation made its Olympic debut at the 1996 Summer Olympics in Atlanta, and its participation in the 2024 Summer Olympics marked its eighth consecutive appearance at the Summer Olympics.

The 2024 Summer Olympics were held in Paris, France, between 26 July and 11 August 2024. Dennick Luke and Thea LaFond served as Dominica's flag bearers during the opening ceremony. LaFond also carried the flag during the closing ceremony.

== Medalists ==
On 3 August 2024, LaFond won the gold medal in the women's triple jump, becoming the first athlete from Dominica to win an Olympic medal.

Medal	Name	Sport	Event	Date
Gold	Thea LaFond	Athletics	Women's triple jump	3 August

== Competitors ==
The Dominican team consisted of four athletes — two men and two women — competing in two sports.

Sport	Men	Women	Total
Athletics	1	1	2
Swimming	1	1	2
Total	2	2	4

== Athletics ==
As per the governing body World Athletics (WA), a NOC was allowed to enter up to three qualified athletes in each individual event and one qualified relay team if the Olympic Qualifying Standards (OQS) had been met during the qualifying period at the events approved by WA. The remaining places are allocated based on the World Athletics Rankings which were derived from the average of the best five results for an athlete over the designated qualifying period, weighted by the importance of the meet. The qualification window for the marathon races was from 1 November 2022 to 30 April 2024; for the 10,000 metres, combined events (heptathlon and decathlon), racewalks, and relays from 31 December 2022 to 30 June 2024; and for the remaining events on the program from 1 July 2023 to 30 June 2024.

Two Dominican track and field athletes achieved the entry standards for the 2024 Summer Olympics. Dennick Luke qualified for the men's 800 m and Thea LaFond qualified for the women's triple jump event. LaFond, who was a dancer, and played volleyball, before taking up athletics, competed in her fourth Olympics after her debut at the 2008 Summer Olympics, and Luke made his Olympic debut.

The athletics events were held at Stade de France in Saint-Denis. The women's triple jump events were held on 2 and 3 August. LaFond qualified for the finals after she achieved the automatic qualifying mark with a jump of 14.35 metres. In the final, she achieved her best jump of 15.02 metres in her second attempt, which was enough to win the gold medal. This was the first ever Olympic medal for Dominica. In the men's 800 metres event, Luke finished eighth in his heats, and set a national record time in the repechage round, but did not make it to the semifinals.

Key

- Note–Ranks given for track events are within the athlete's heat only
- Q = Qualified for the next round
- q = Qualified for the next round as a fastest loser or, in field events, by position without achieving the qualifying target
- NR = National record
- N/A = Round not applicable for the event
- Bye = Athlete not required to compete in round

Track and road events

Athlete	Event	Heat		Repechage		Semifinal		Final	
Athlete	Event	Result	Rank	Result	Rank	Result	Rank	Result	Rank
Dennick Luke	Men's 800 m	1:47.54	8	1:46.81 NR	6	Did not advance			

Field events

Athlete	Event	Qualification		Final	
Athlete	Event	Distance	Position	Distance	Position
Thea LaFond	Women's triple jump	14.35	7 Q	15.02	1st place, gold medalist(s)

== Swimming ==
As per the World Aquatics guidelines, a NOC was permitted to enter a maximum of two qualified athletes in each individual event, who have achieved the Olympic Qualifying Time. One athlete per event will be allowed to enter if they meet the Olympic Selection Time if the quota is not filled. NOCs were allowed to enter swimmers (one per gender) under a universality place even if no one achieved the standard entry times. Dominica was awarded two universality quota places in swimming.

Warren Lawrence competed in the men's 50 m freestyle, and Jasmine Schofield competed in the women's 50 m freestyle event. Lawrence is a national record holder in the event. This was Dominica's first appearance in the swimming events at the Olympics after 24 years.

The swimming events were held at the Paris La Défense Arena. Both Lawrence and Schofield did not make it out of the heats.

Athlete	Event	Heat		Semifinal		Final	
Athlete	Event	Time	Rank	Time	Rank	Time	Rank
Warren Lawrence	Men's 50 m freestyle	24.67	52	Did not advance			
Jasmine Schofield	Women's 50 m freestyle	29.91	60	Did not advance			

Qualifiers for the latter rounds (Q) of all events were decided on a time only basis, therefore positions shown are overall results versus competitors in all heats.

== See also ==
- Dominica at the 2023 Pan American Games
