= Dominica at the 1996 Summer Olympics =

- IOC code: DMA
- NOC: Dominica Olympic Committee
- Website: www.doc.dm

in Atlanta
- Competitors: 6 in 2 sports
- Flag bearer: Jérôme Romain
- Medals: Gold 0 Silver 0 Bronze 0 Total 0

Summer Olympics appearances (overview)
- 1996; 2000; 2004; 2008; 2012; 2016; 2020; 2024

Dominica competed in the Olympic Games for the first time at the 1996 Summer Olympics in Atlanta, United States.

== Competitors ==
The following is the list of number of competitors in the Games.

Sport	Men	Women	Total
Athletics	3	2	5
Swimming	1	0	1
Total	4	2	6

== Athletics ==
Key
Q = Qualified for the next round
q = Qualified for the next round as a fastest loser or, in field events, by position without achieving the qualifying target
NM = No Mark recorded
NR = National record
N/A = Round not applicable for the event
Bye = Athlete not required to compete in round

Men

Athlete	Event	Heat		Semifinal		Final	
Athlete	Event	Result	Rank	Result	Rank	Result	Rank
Cedric Harris	800m	1:51.46	6	did not advance			
Steve Agar	1500m	3:43.02	8	did not advance			
Jérôme Romain	Triple Jump	16.80	10 q	n/a		NM	12

Women

Athlete	Event	Heat		Semifinal		Final	
Athlete	Event	Result	Rank	Result	Rank	Result	Rank
Hermin Joseph	100m	11.56	5	did not advance			
Dawn Williams	800m	1:59.65	3 q	1:59.06	5	did not advance	

== Swimming ==
Key
Q = Qualified for the next round
q = Qualified for the next round as a fastest loser or, in field events, by position without achieving the qualifying target
NR = National record
N/A = Round not applicable for the event
Bye = Swimmer not required to compete in round

Men

Athlete	Event	Heat		Semifinal		Final	
Athlete	Event	Result	Rank	Result	Rank	Result	Rank
Woodrow Lawrence	50m freestyle	27.88	60	did not advance			
