= Dominica at the 2016 Summer Olympics =

- IOC code: DMA
- NOC: Dominica Olympic Committee
- Website: www.doc.dm

in Rio de Janeiro
- Competitors: 2 in 1 sport
- Flag bearer: Yordanys Durañona
- Medals: Gold 0 Silver 0 Bronze 0 Total 0

Summer Olympics appearances (overview)
- 1996; 2000; 2004; 2008; 2012; 2016; 2020; 2024

Dominica participated at the 2016 Summer Olympics in Rio de Janeiro from 5 to 21 August 2016. The country's participation in Rio marked its sixth appearance in the Summer Olympics since its debut at the 1996 Summer Olympics. The delegation included two athletes: Yordanys Durañona and Thea LaFond, both competing in the men's and women's triple jump, respectively. The former qualified for the Games by meeting qualification standards while the latter entered the quadrennial event through a wildcard place. Neither athlete progressed further than the first round of their sport events.

== Background ==
Dominica participated in six Summer Olympic Games between its debut at the 1996 Summer Olympics in Atlanta, United States and the 2016 Summer Olympics in Rio de Janeiro, Brazil. The highest number of athletes sent by Dominica to a Summer Games is six to the 1996 Olympics. No Dominican athlete has ever won a medal at the Olympic Games. Dominica participated at the 2016 Rio Summer olympics from 5 to 21 August 2016.

The Dominica National Olympic Committee (NOC) selected one athlete (Durañona) through qualification standards. NOCs may enter athletes regardless of time (one athlete per sex) if they have no athletes meeting the entry standard. This made it possible for Dominica to have two representatives in the sport. The two athletes that were selected to compete in the Rio Games were Yordanys Durañona in the men's triple jump and Thea LaFond in the women's triple jump. Durañona was selected as the flag bearer for both the opening and closing ceremonies.

== Athletics (track and field) ==
Both athletes participated in the triple jump event. Yordanys Durañona qualified for the male's event by meeting qualification standards. Dominica used their wildcard spot for Thea LaFond in the women's triple jump. Durañona was among seven other people to scratch all three of their attempted jumps, failing to achieve a mark and therefore not having a position. Meanwhile, Thea LaFond ranked dead last with a score of 12.82 metres (42.1 ft). LaFond said that in the middle of her first jump, she felt that she pulled her hamstring and perhaps the same with her middle finger. After she was eliminated, LaFond said that the injury "was the greatest chip on my shoulder that the universe could have ever thrown [her] way."

Key

- Note–Ranks given for track events are within the athlete's heat only

Field events

Athlete	Event	Qualification		Final	
Athlete	Event	Distance	Position	Distance	Position
Yordanys Durañona	Men's triple jump	NM	—	did not advance	
Thea LaFond	Women's triple jump	12.82	37	did not advance	

== See also ==
- Dominica at the 2015 Pan American Games
