= Dominica at the 2020 Summer Olympics =

- IOC code: DMA
- NOC: Dominica Olympic Committee
- Website: www.doc.dm

in Tokyo, Japan July 23, 2021 – August 8, 2021
- Competitors: 2 in 1 sport
- Flag bearers (opening): Thea LaFond; Dennick Luke
- Flag bearer (closing): Thea LaFond
- Medals: Gold 0 Silver 0 Bronze 0 Total 0

Summer Olympics appearances (overview)
- 1996; 2000; 2004; 2008; 2012; 2016; 2020; 2024

Dominica competed at the 2020 Summer Olympics in Tokyo. Originally scheduled to take place from 24 July to 9 August 2020, the Games were postponed to 23 July to 8 August 2021, due to the COVID-19 pandemic. The country's participation in Tokyo marked its seventh appearance at the Summer Olympics since its debut in 1996.

The Dominica delegation consisted of two athletes: triple jumper Thea LaFond and middle-distance runner Dennick Luke. LaFond qualified for the games after she had met a qualifying mark in her event while Luke qualified after receiving a universality slot. During the qualification round of the women's triple jump, LaFond had set a national record and qualified for the finals. She would later place 12th. Luke competed in the first round of the men's 800 metres, where he had placed last.

== Background ==
Originally scheduled to take place from 24 July to 9 August 2020, the 2020 Summer Olympics were postponed to 23 July to 8 August 2021, due to the COVID-19 pandemic. This edition of the Games marked the nation's seventh appearance at the Summer Olympics since they debuted at the 1996 Summer Olympics held in Atlanta, United States.

=== Delegation ===
The Dominica delegation was composed of eight people. Officials present were chef de mission and COVID Liaison officer Woody Lawrence, press attaché Garvin Richards, physiotherapist Kara Flagg, Dominica Olympic Committee (DOC) president Billy Doctrove, and acting secretary general Brendan Williams. The coach that was present was Aaron Gadson. The athletes that competed were triple jumper Thea LaFond and middle-distance runner Dennick Luke. LaFond had competed previously for the nation at a Games, competing at the 2016 Summer Olympics. She would be the first Dominican woman to compete in consecutive Olympic Games.

=== Opening and closing ceremonies ===
The Dominica delegation marched 117th out of 206 countries in the 2020 Summer Olympics Parade of Nations within the opening ceremony, due to the host's use of the local kana alphabetical system. (Note: Japanese: ドミニカ, romanized: Dominika) Luke and Lafond held the flag for the delegation in the ceremony. At the closing ceremony, LaFond was the designated flagbearer for the nation.

== Competitors ==
List of Dominican competitors at the 2020 Summer Olympics
Sport	Men	Women	Total
Athletics	1	1	2
Total	1	1	2

== Athletics ==
LaFond had qualified for the games after she recorded a distance of 14.33 metres in a qualifying event, which would meet the qualifying standard of 14.32 metres. She had also subsequently recorded a higher distance at 14.54 metres in the event and was ranked 12th in the world before the games. Luke qualified after he had received a universality slot in his event, which allows underrepresented nations to compete and for a National Olympic Committee to send athletes despite not meeting the other qualification criteria.

LaFond would compete first in the qualification round of the women's triple jump on 30 July. She would record a distance of 14.60 metres, breaking the national record. She had also placed third in the round and would qualify for the finals. In the finals, she would record a distance of 12.57 metres and placed twelfth overall.

Luke competed in the first round of the men's 800 metres on 31 July. He ran in a time of 1:54.30 and placed last out of the eight people in his round. He did not advance further.

Key

- Note–Ranks given for track events are within the athlete's heat only
- Q = Qualified for the next round
- q = Qualified for the next round as a fastest loser or, in field events, by position without achieving the qualifying target
- NR = National record
- N/A = Round not applicable for the event
- Bye = Athlete not required to compete in round

Track and road events summary
Athlete	Event	Heat		Semifinal		Final	
Athlete	Event	Result	Rank	Result	Rank	Result	Rank
Dennick Luke	Men's 800 m	1:54.30	8	Did not advance			

Field events summary
Athlete	Event	Qualification		Final	
Athlete	Event	Distance	Position	Distance	Position
Thea LaFond	Women's triple jump	14.60 NR	3 Q	12.57	12

== See also ==
- Dominica at the 2019 Pan American Games
