= Dominica at the 2004 Summer Olympics =

- IOC code: DMA
- NOC: Dominica Olympic Committee
- Website: www.doc.dm

in Athens
- Competitors: 2 in 1 sport
- Flag bearer: Chris Lloyd
- Medals: Gold 0 Silver 0 Bronze 0 Total 0

Summer Olympics appearances (overview)
- 1996; 2000; 2004; 2008; 2012; 2016; 2020; 2024

Dominica was represented at the 2004 Summer Olympics in Athens, Greece by the Dominica Olympic Committee.

In total, two athletes including one man and one woman represented Dominica in one sport: athletics.

== Background ==
The 2004 Summer Olympics in Athens, Greece marked Dominica's third appearance at the Olympics after the country made its Olympic debut at the 1996 Summer Olympics in Atlanta, Georgia, United States. They had not previously won a medal. The delegation at the 2004 games would be their smallest so far after six athletes competed in 1996 and four contested the 2000 Summer Olympics in Sydney, New South Wales, Australia.

== Competitors ==
In total, two athletes represented Dominica at the 2004 Summer Olympics in Athens, Greece in one sport.

| Sport | Men | Women | Total |
|---|---|---|---|
| Athletics | 1 | 1 | 2 |
| Total | 1 | 1 | 2 |

== Athletics ==
In total, two Dominican athletes participated in the athletics events – Marie-Lyne Joseph in the women's 800 m and Chris Lloyd in the men's 400 m.

Most of the athletics events – including those which Dominican athletes took part in – took place at the Athens Olympic Stadium in Marousi, Athens from 18 to 29 August 2004.

The heats for the men's 400 m took place on 20 August 2004. Lloyd finished sixth in his heat in a time of 47.98 seconds and he did not advance to the semi-finals.

| Athlete | Event | Heat | | Semifinal | | Final | |
| Athlete | Event | Result | Rank | Result | Rank | Result | Rank |
|---|---|---|---|---|---|---|---|
| Chris Lloyd | 400 m | 47.98 | 6 | did not advance | | | |

The heats for the women's 800 m took place on 20 August 2004. Joseph finished seventh in her heat in a time of two minutes 20.23 seconds and she did not advance to the semi-finals.

| Athlete | Event | Heat | | Semifinal | | Final | |
| Athlete | Event | Result | Rank | Result | Rank | Result | Rank |
|---|---|---|---|---|---|---|---|
| Marie-Lyne Joseph | 800 m | 2:20.23 | 7 | did not advance | | | |

== Aftermath ==
Dominica had established itself as a regular competitor at the Summer Olympics. They have entered every edition since 1996. They made their Winter Olympic debut at the 2014 Winter Olympics in Sochi, Russia and won their first medal of any colour by taking gold in the women's triple jump at the 2024 Summer Olympics in Paris, France.

== See also ==
- Dominica at the 2003 Pan American Games
