= DAAA =

DAAA may refer to:

- Dominica Amateur Athletic Association
- Dwarf Athletic Association of America
