= Dominica at the 2008 Summer Olympics =

- IOC code: DMA
- NOC: Dominica Olympic Committee
- Website: www.doc.dm

in Beijing
- Competitors: 2 in 1 sport
- Flag bearer: Jérôme Romain
- Medals: Gold 0 Silver 0 Bronze 0 Total 0

Summer Olympics appearances (overview)
- 1996; 2000; 2004; 2008; 2012; 2016; 2020; 2024; 2028

Dominica sent a delegation of eight people, including two athletes, to compete at the 2008 Summer Olympics in Beijing, China. Its appearance in Beijing marked the fourth time a delegation from Dominica participated in an Olympic games since its debut at the 1996 Olympic games, one of its smallest delegations in its history and the first Dominican delegation that did not include female athletes. Chris Lloyd ran for Dominica in the men's 200 meters and Erison Hurtault participated in the men's 400 meters. Neither advanced past the qualification rounds. Lloyd was also supposed to compete in the men's 400 meters, but did not participate in it. Track coach Jérôme Romain was the country's flag bearer at the Olympics.

== Background ==
Dominica is an island nation located in the far eastern rim of the Caribbean Sea that lis between the French colonies of Guadeloupe (to the north) and Martinique to the south. The country's debut in the Olympics was in Atlanta during the 1996 Summer Olympics, and it has participated in every summer Olympics between then and the Beijing Olympics in 2008–numbering four in total. The largest delegation sent by Dominica was in 1996, and the size of its delegation decreased to four in the 2000 Summer Olympics in Sydney, then to two in the 2004 Summer Olympics in Athens. Dominica's Beijing delegation also only included two athletes, although its appearance at the Olympics marked the first Dominican delegation that included no women. As of the 2008 Beijing Summer Olympics, Dominican athletes had not won any medals. Jerome Romain, the coach accompanying the Dominican delegation, was the nation's flagbearer at the ceremonies.

The delegation of Dominica in Beijing totaled eight people. Other than the two athletes, Chris Lloyd and Erison Hurtault, Dominican Olympic Committee president Rosanne Pringle, Chef de Mission Hubert "Mickey" Joseph, Dominican Olympic Committee secretary-general Lesley Ann Green, and Youth Olympians Attainea Toulon and William Moise were also included in the delegation, along with coach Jerome Romain. Lloyd qualified for both the men's 200 meters and men's 400 meter, ranking in the top ten in the world in the men's 200 meters at the time. Lloyd, however, did not end up participating in the men's 400 meters dash, and raced only in the men's 200 meters.

== Athletics ==
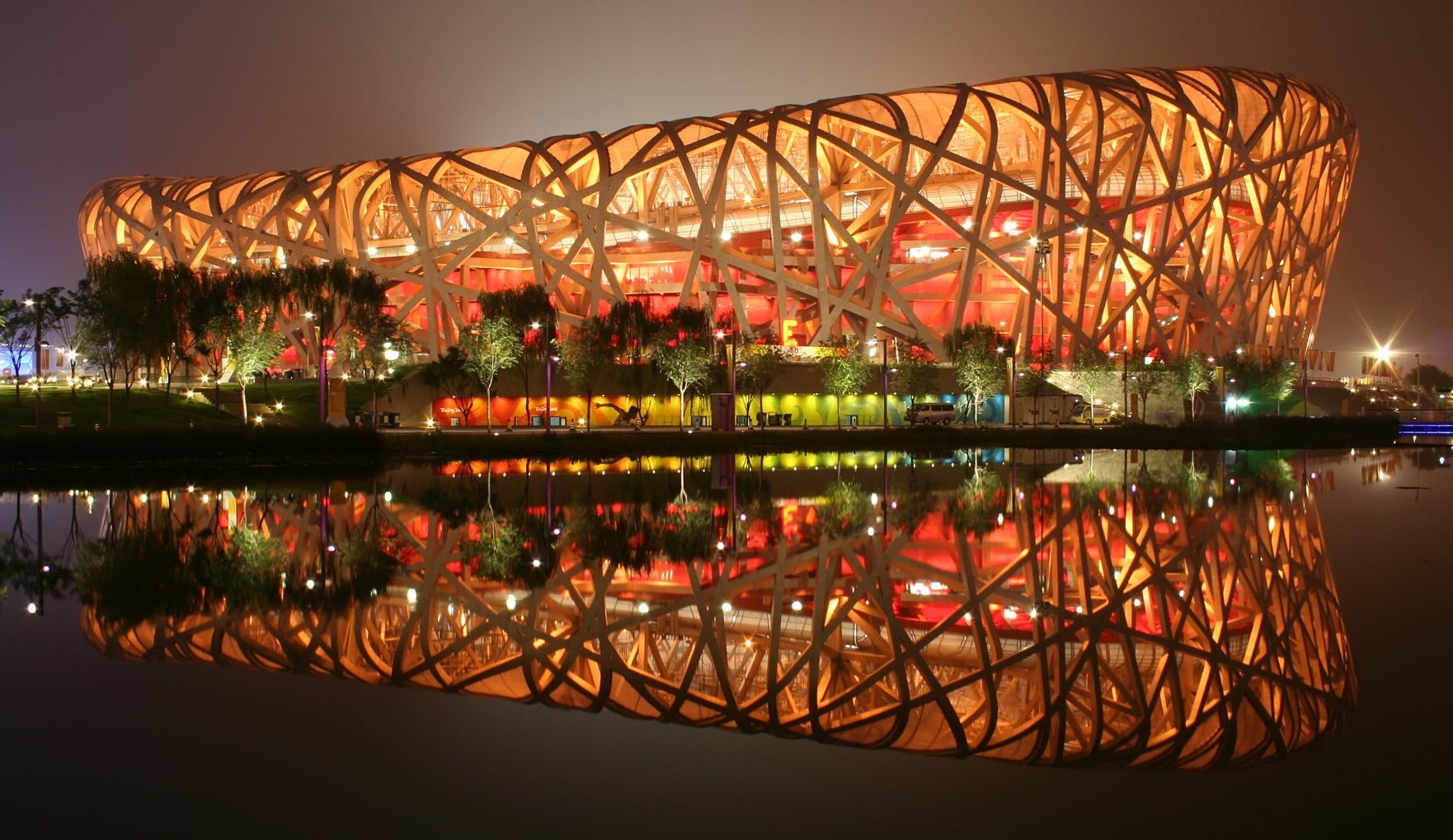
The Beijing National Stadium, where Lloyd and Hurtault competed in their events.

27-year-old Chris Lloyd participated on Dominica's behalf at the Beijing Olympics in the men's 200 meters dash. Born in Houston, Texas, Lloyd's Olympic career began with his participation in the men's 400 meters dash, in which he competed while a 23-year-old in the 2004 Athens games. During the 17 August qualification round, Lloyd was placed in the third heat. He completed the race in fifth place, finishing with a time of 20.90 seconds. In doing so, Lloyd defeated Uruguay's Heber Viera (20.93 seconds) but fell behind Slovenia's Matic Osovnikar (20.89 seconds). The leaders of Lloyd's heat included Great Britain's Marlon Devonish (20.49 seconds) and Saint Kitts and Nevis' Kim Collins (20.55 seconds). Overall, 62 athletes finished their races in the qualification round of the event. Lloyd placed 32nd. He did not advance to later rounds.

Erison Hurtault competed for Dominica in the men's 400 meters dash. In Beijing, Hurtault was the only Dominican participating in the event. Born in Matawan, a New Jersey suburb of New York, and attending Columbia University, Hurtault initially tried out for the United States Olympic team, but failed to qualify, before taking the berth offered to him by his parents' homeland. Hurtault was 23 at the time of his competition in Beijing, and had not previously competed in any Olympic games. During the 17 August qualification round, the Dominican-American athlete was placed in the fourth heat. He finished in fourth place with a time of 46.10 seconds, displacing Uruguay's Andres Bayron Silva (46.32 seconds) but falling behind Jamaica's Ricardo Chambers (45.22 seconds). The leaders of Hurtault's heat included Great Britain's Martyn Rooney (45.00 seconds) and Australia's Sean Wroe (45.17 seconds). Overall, he ranked 34th out of the 55 athletes who completed the qualification round of the event. Hurtault did not advance to later rounds.

Men

Athlete	Event	Heat		Quarterfinal		Semifinal		Final	
Athlete	Event	Result	Rank	Result	Rank	Result	Rank	Result	Rank
Chris Lloyd	200 m	20.90	5	Did not advance					
Erison Hurtault	400 m	46.10	4	—N/a		Did not advance			

Key

- Note–Ranks given for track events are within the athlete's heat only
- Q = Qualified for the next round
- q = Qualified for the next round as a fastest loser or, in field events, by position without achieving the qualifying target
- NR = National record
- N/A = Round not applicable for the event
- Bye = Athlete not required to compete in round

== See also ==
- Dominica at the 2007 Pan American Games
- Dominica at the 2010 Central American and Caribbean Games
