= Dominica at the 2009 World Championships in Athletics =

- WA code: DMA

in Berlin
- Competitors: 1
- Medals: Gold 0 Silver 0 Bronze 0 Total 0

World Championships in Athletics appearances
- 1987; 1991; 1993; 1995; 1997; 1999; 2001; 2003; 2005; 2007; 2009; 2011; 2013; 2015; 2017; 2019; 2022; 2023; 2025

Dominica competed at the 2009 World Championships in Athletics in Berlin, Germany, which were held from 15 to 23 August 2009. The athlete delegation consisted of one athlete, sprinter Erison Hurtault. Hurtault competed in the men's 400 metres and reached the semifinals of the event.

== Background ==
The 2009 World Championships in Athletics were held at the Olympiastadion in Berlin, Germany. Under the auspices of the International Amateur Athletic Federation, this was the twelfth edition of the World Championships. It was held from 15 to 23 August 2009 and had 47 different events. Among the competing nations was Dominica. For this edition of the World Championships in Athletics, American sprinter Erison Hurtault was the sole participant for Dominica. At the World Championships, he was entered in the men's 400 metres. Although Hurtault holds American citizenship and no Dominican citizenship, he was eligible to represent the country as both of his parents were born there. Previously, Hurtault competed for Dominica at the 2008 Summer Olympics in Beijing, China.

== Results ==
=== Men ===
Hurtault competed in the preliminary heats of the men's 400 metres on 18 August in the seventh heat. He raced against seven other athletes. There, he recorded a time of 45.55 seconds and placed fourth, advancing further as his time was one of the fastest out of the athletes who placed outside of the top three in each heat. In the semifinals of the event held on the same day, he competed in the second heat. There, he recorded a time of 45.59 seconds and placed fifth, failing to advance to the finals.

Event	Athletes	Heats		Semifinal		Final	
Event	Athletes	Result	Rank	Result	Rank	Result	Rank
400 m	Erison Hurtault	45.55 SB	4	45.59	5	did not advance	
