= 2025 European Athletics Indoor Championships – Women's triple jump =

Women's triple jump at the 2025 European Athletics Indoor Championships
- Venue: Omnisport Apeldoorn
- Location: Apeldoorn, Netherlands
- Dates: 6 March 2025 (qualification); 7 March 2025 (final)
- Competitors: 18 from 12 nations
- Winning distance: 14.37 m

Medalists
gold medal	Ana Peleteiro-Compaoré	Spain
silver medal	Diana Ana Maria Ion	Romania
bronze medal	Senni Salminen	Finland

The women's triple jump at the 2025 European Athletics Indoor Championships was held on the short track of Omnisport in Apeldoorn, Netherlands, on 6 and 7 March 2025. This was the 18th time the event is contested at the European Athletics Indoor Championships. Athletes can qualify by achieving the entry standard or by their World Athletics Ranking in the event.

The qualifying round was scheduled for 6 March during the evening session. The final was scheduled for 7 March during the evening session.

== Background ==
The women's triple jump was contested 17 times before 2025, held every time since 1990. The 2025 European Athletics Indoor Championships was held in Omnisport Apeldoorn in Apeldoorn, Netherlands. The removable indoor athletics track was retopped for these championships in September 2024.

Yulimar Rojas is the world record holder in the event, with a distance of 15.74 m, set in 2022. Tatyana Lebedeva holds the European record, with a mark of 15.36 m, set in 2004. The championship record of 15.16 m is held by Ashia Hansen and was set at the 1998 championships.

Records before the 2025 European Athletics Indoor Championships
Record	Athlete (nation)	Distance (m)	Location	Date
World record	Yulimar Rojas (VEN)	15.74	Belgrade, Serbia	20 March 2022
European record	Tatyana Lebedeva (RUS)	15.36	Budapest, Hungary	6 March 2004
Championship record	Ashia Hansen (GBR)	15.16	Valencia, Spain	28 February 1998
World leading	Leyanis Pérez Hernández (CUB)	14.62	Liévin, France	13 February 2025
European leading	Ana Peleteiro-Compaoré (ESP)	14.33	Madrid, Spain	22 February 2025

== Qualification ==
For the women's triple jump, the qualification period runs from 25 February 2024 until 23 February 2025. Athletes can qualify by achieving the entry standards of 14.35 m or by virtue of their World Athletics Ranking for the event. There is a target number of 18 athletes.

== Rounds ==
=== Qualification ===
The qualifying round was held on 6 March, starting at 18:35 (UTC+1) in the evening. All athletes meeting the Qualification Standard of 14.00 m (Q) or at least 8 best performers (q) advanced to the Final.

Results of the qualification round
Rank	Athlete	Nation	#1	#2	#3	Result	Notes	PB
1	Ana Peleteiro-Compaoré	Spain	13.92	14.14		14.14	Q	14.87
2	Tuğba Danışmaz	Turkey	x	14.10		14.10	Q, SB	14.57
3	Senni Salminen	Finland	14.02			14.02	Q	14.63
4	Neja Filipič	Slovenia	x	x	13.95	13.95	q	14.42
5	Ilionis Guillaume	France	13.93	13.58	x	13.93	q	14.59
6	Gabriela Petrova	Bulgaria	13.90	x	r	13.90	q, SB	14.66
7	Diana Ana Maria Ion	Romania	13.64	13.88	13.85	13.88	q	14.23
8	Dovilė Kilty	Lithuania	13.65	13.86	x	13.86	q, SB	14.28
9	Maja Åskag	Sweden	13.76	13.74	x	13.76		14.27
10	Kira Wittmann	Germany	13.34	13.57	13.63	13.63		14.08
11	Mariia Siney	Ukraine	x	12.90	13.56	13.56		14.12
12	Aina Grikšaitė	Lithuania	13.45	13.52	13.52	13.52		14.08
13	Jessie Maduka	Germany	13.44	13.50	13.36	13.50		14.15
14	Diana Zagainova	Lithuania	x	13.13	13.42	13.42		14.43
15	Olha Korsun	Ukraine	13.03	x	13.39	13.39		14.20
16	Linda Suchá	Czech Republic	x	13.36	x	13.36		13.84
17	Anna Krasutska	Ukraine	13.19	13.11	x	13.19		14.15
	Elena Andreea Taloș	Romania	x	r		NM		14.47

=== Final ===
The final was held on 7 March, starting at 18:50 (UTC+1) in the evening.

Rank	Athlete	Nation	#1	#2	#3	#4	#5	#6	Result	Notes
1st place, gold medalist(s)	Ana Peleteiro-Compaoré	Spain	x	14.20	13.96	–	14.37	x	14.37	EL
2nd place, silver medalist(s)	Diana Ana Maria Ion	Romania	13.82	13.99	13.76	13.69	13.98	14.31	14.31	PB
3rd place, bronze medalist(s)	Senni Salminen	Finland	x	13.64	x	x	x	13.99	13.99	
4	Dovilė Kilty	Lithuania	x	13.65	x	13.80	x	13.60	13.80	
5	Tuğba Danışmaz	Turkey	13.79	x	x	x	x	x	13.79	
6	Ilionis Guillaume	France	13.54	x	13.52	x	13.43	13.53	13.54	
7	Gabriela Petrova	Bulgaria	x	x	x	13.51	13.32	x	13.51	
8	Neja Filipič	Slovenia	x	x	x	x	13.39	x	13.39	
