= Dominica at the 2012 Summer Olympics =

- IOC code: DMA
- NOC: Dominica Olympic Committee
- Website: www.doc.dm

in London
- Competitors: 2 in 1 sport
- Flag bearers: Erison Hurtault (opening); Luan Gabriel (closing)
- Medals: Gold 0 Silver 0 Bronze 0 Total 0

Summer Olympics appearances (overview)
- 1996; 2000; 2004; 2008; 2012; 2016; 2020; 2024

Dominica participated in the 2012 Summer Olympics in London from 27 July to 12 August 2012. The country's participation in London marked its fifth appearance in the Summer Olympics since its debut in the 1996 Summer Olympics. The delegation included two athletes: Erison Hurtault and Luan Gabriel, the former qualified for the Games by meeting qualification standards while the latter entered the quadrennial event through a wildcard place. Hurtault was selected as the flag bearer for the opening ceremony while Gabriel carried the flag at the closing ceremony. Neither athlete progressed farther than the first round of their respective events.

== Background ==
Dominica participated in five Summer Olympic Games between its debut at the 1996 Summer Olympics in Atlanta, United States and the 2012 Summer Olympics in London, England. No Dominican athlete has ever won a medal at the Olympic Games. Dominica participated in the London Summer Games from 27 July to 12 August 2012. The country sent athletics competitors and Erison Hurtault and Luan Gabriel to the Games. Along with the two athletes the delegation was led by coach and chef de mission Joel Hamilton. The team trained at Surrey Sports Park at the University of Surrey in Guildford to prepare for the games. Hurtault was selected as the flag bearer for the opening ceremony while Gabriel was the flag bearer at the closing ceremony.

== Athletics ==
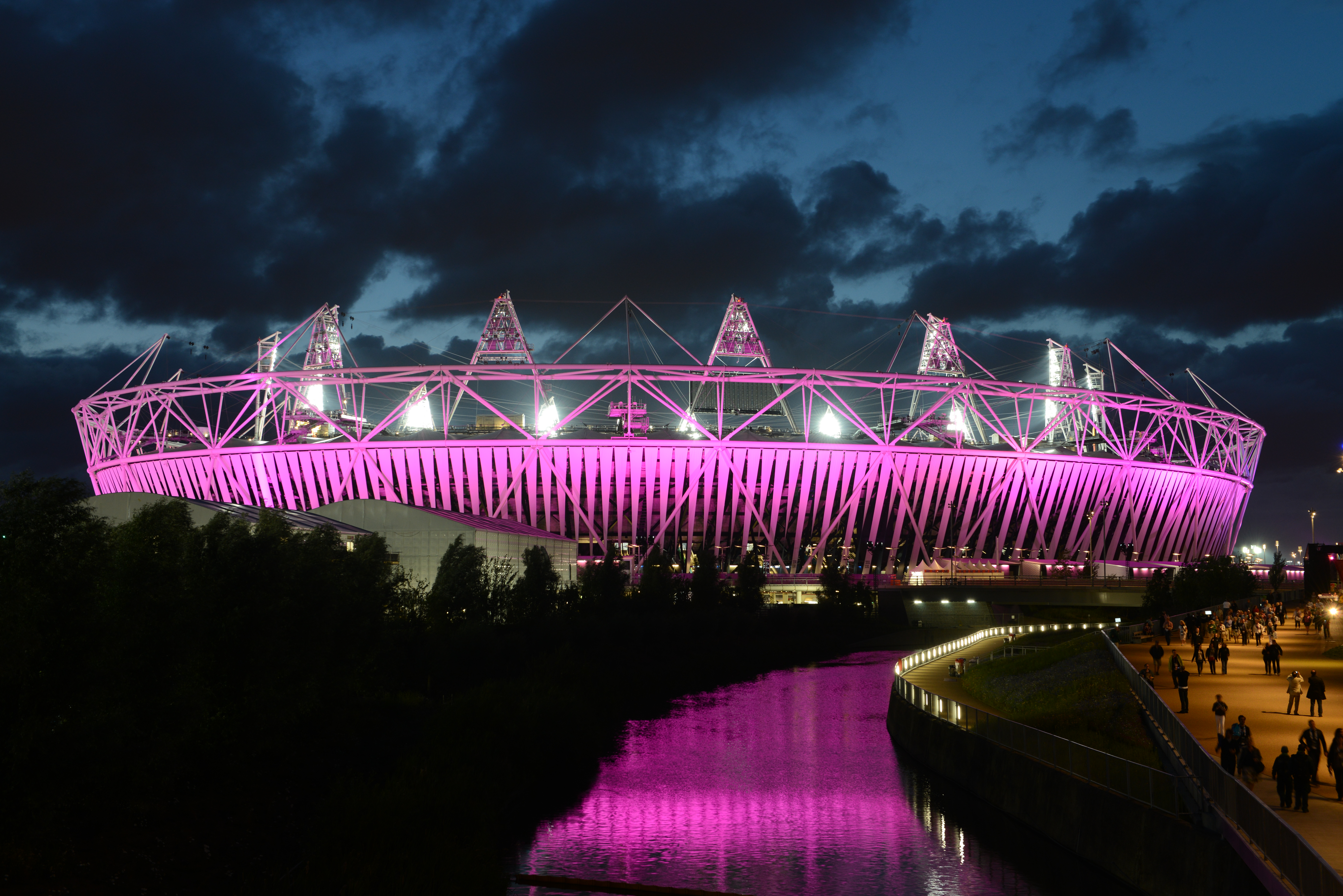
The London Olympic Stadium, where Hurtault and Gabriel competed in athletics events

At the age of 27, Erison Hurtault was the sole male athlete representing Dominica at the Olympics. He previously participated in the 2008 Summer Olympics in Beijing. Hurtault qualified for the games because his fastest time of 45.59 seconds between 1 May 2011 and 8 July 2012, set at the 2011 Ninove Memorial Geert Rasschaert, was the exact "B" qualifying time standard required for his event, the men's 400 metres. Before the Olympics, Joel Hamilton felt the runner would progress beyond the first round and Hurtault's personal trainer was confident he was in good fitness. He was drawn in the seventh heat on 4 August, finishing fifth out of seven athletes, with a time of 46.05 seconds. Hurtault placed 31st overall out of 47 runners, (Note: Two athletes, Mathieu Gnanligo and LaShawn Merritt did not finish and nine (Diego Palomeque, Ahmed Mohamed Al-Merjabi, Renny Quow, John Steffensen, Michael Mathieu, William Collazo, Arismendy Peguero, Rondell Bartholomew and Errol Nolan) did not start.) and did not advance to the semi-finals after finishing 0.59 seconds slower than the slowest athlete in his heat who made the later stages. Afterwards Hurtault felt he could have finished higher but thanked the Dominican people for supporting him.

Luan Gabriel was the youngest person to participate for Dominica at the London Games at age 16. She was making her first appearance in the quadrennial event. Gabriel qualified for the games via a wildcard because her fastest time between 1 May 2011 and 8 July 2012 of 24.09 seconds, set in Hamilton, Bermuda, was 0.79 seconds slower than the "B" qualifying standard for her event, the women's 200 metres. She took part in the contest's sixth heat on 6 August, finishing eighth (and last) of all runners, with a time of 24.12 seconds. Overall Gabriel ranked 47th out of 52 finishers, (Note: Two athletes, Cydonie Mothersille and Marlena Wesh, did not start.) and did not progress to the semi-finals because she was 1.02 seconds slower than the slowest runner in her heat who made the later stages. After the games, Gabriel said she was concerned about her hamstring but felt "very proud" to be competing despite her preference of recording a faster time.

=== Men ===
Athlete	Event	Heat		Semifinal		Final	
Athlete	Event	Result	Rank	Result	Rank	Result	Rank
Erison Hurtault	400 m	46.05	5	Did not advance			

=== Women ===
Athlete	Event	Heat		Semifinal		Final	
Athlete	Event	Result	Rank	Result	Rank	Result	Rank
Luan Gabriel	200 m	24.12	9	did not advance			

=== Key ===
- Note–Ranks given for track events are within the athlete's heat only
