= Dominica at the Olympics =

- IOC code: DMA
- NOC: Dominica Olympic Committee
- Website: www.doc.dm
- Medals Ranked 118th: Gold 1 Silver 0 Bronze 0 Total 1

Summer appearances
- 1996; 2000; 2004; 2008; 2012; 2016; 2020; 2024; 2028

Winter appearances
- 2014; 2018–2026

Dominica first competed at the Olympic Games in 1996, and has participated in every Summer Olympic Games since then. The nation has participated only once (as of 2026) at the Winter Olympic Games in 2014.

The Dominica Olympic Committee was formed in 1993 and recognized in 1998, 20 years after its independence.

The country earned its first medal in 2024, when Thea LaFond won gold in the women's triple jump competition.

== Medal tables ==
=== Medals by Summer Games ===
Games	Athletes	Gold	Silver	Bronze	Total	Rank
1996 Atlanta	6	0	0	0	0	–
2000 Sydney	4	0	0	0	0	–
2004 Athens	2	0	0	0	0	–
2008 Beijing	2	0	0	0	0	–
2012 London	2	0	0	0	0	–
2016 Rio de Janeiro	2	0	0	0	0	–
2020 Tokyo	2	0	0	0	0	–
2024 Paris	4	1	0	0	1	62
2028 Los Angeles	future event					
2032 Brisbane	future event					
Total		1	0	0	1	118

=== Medals by Winter Games ===
Games	Athletes	Gold	Silver	Bronze	Total	Rank
2014 Sochi	2	0	0	0	0	–
2018 Pyeongchang	did not participate					
2022 Beijing	did not participate					
2026 Milano Cortina	did not participate					
2030 French Alps	future event					
2034 Utah	future event					
Total		0	0	0	0	–

== List of medalists ==
Medal	Name	Games	Sport	Event
Gold	Thea LaFond	2024 Paris	Athletics	Women's triple jump

== See also ==
- List of flag bearers for Dominica at the Olympics
- Dominica at the Commonwealth Games
- Tropical nations at the Winter Olympics
