= Dominica at the 2017 World Championships in Athletics =

- Flag of Dominica
- WA code: DMA
- National federation: Dominica Amateur Athletic Association

in London, United Kingdom 4–13 August 2017
- Competitors: 2 (1 man and 1 woman) in 2 events
- Medals: Gold 0 Silver 0 Bronze 0 Total 0

World Championships in Athletics appearances
- 1987; 1991; 1993; 1995; 1997; 1999; 2001; 2003; 2005; 2007; 2009; 2011; 2013; 2015; 2017; 2019; 2022; 2023

Dominica competed at the 2017 World Championships in Athletics in London, Great Britain, from 4–13 August 2017.

== Results ==
=== Men ===
Field events

Athlete	Event	Qualification		Final	
Athlete	Event	Distance	Position	Distance	Position
Yordanis Durañona	Triple jump	16.71	10 q	16.42	11

=== Women ===
Field events

Athlete	Event	Qualification		Final	
Athlete	Event	Distance	Position	Distance	Position
Thea LaFond	Triple jump	13.82	19	Did not advance	
