= Marcia Daniel =

Dominican athletics competitor (born 1977)

Personal information
- Born: 30 September 1977 (age 48) Portsmouth, Dominica

Sport
- Sport: Track and field

Marcia Fernanda Daniel (born 30 September 1977) is a retired athlete who competed for Dominica.

She competed at the 2000 Summer Olympic Games in the women's 400 metres, she finished 7th in her first round so failed to advance.

Olympic Games
Preceded by Jérôme Romain	Flagbearer for Dominica; Sydney 2000	Succeeded by Chris Lloyd
