= Dominica at the 2019 World Athletics Championships =

Dominica at the 2019 World Championships in Athletics
- Flag of Dominica
- WA code: DMA
- National federation: Dominica Amateur Athletic Association

in Doha, Qatar 27 September 2019 – 6 October 2019
- Competitors: 1 in 1 event
- Medals: Gold 0 Silver 0 Bronze 0 Total 0

World Championships in Athletics appearances
- 1987; 1991; 1993; 1995; 1997; 1999; 2001; 2003; 2005; 2007; 2009; 2011; 2013; 2015; 2017; 2019; 2022; 2023

Dominica was set to compete at the 2019 World Athletics Championships in Doha, Qatar, from 27 September to 6 October 2019.

== Results ==
Key

- Q = Qualified for the next round
- q = Qualified for the next round as a fastest loser or, in field events, by position without achieving the qualifying target
- NR = National record
- PB = Personal best
- SB = Season best
- N/A = Round not applicable for the event

=== Women ===
Field events

Athlete	Event	Qualification		Final	
Athlete	Event	Distance	Position	Distance	Position
Thea LaFond	Triple jump	DNS		Did not advance	
