= 2024 World Athletics Indoor Championships – Women's triple jump =

Women's triple jump at the 2024 World Athletics Indoor Championships
- Venue: Emirates Arena
- Dates: 3 March 2024
- Competitors: 16 from 13 nations
- Winning distance: 15.01 m

Medalists
gold medal	Thea LaFond	Dominica
silver medal	Leyanis Pérez	Cuba
bronze medal	Ana Peleteiro	Spain

The women's triple jump at the 2024 World Athletics Indoor Championships took place on 3 March 2024 at the Emirates Arena in Glasgow.

== Results ==
The final started at 10:17.

Rank	Athlete	Nationality	#1	#2	#3	#4	#5	#6	Result	Notes
1st place, gold medalist(s)	Thea LaFond	Dominica	14.41	15.01					15.01	WL, NR
2nd place, silver medalist(s)	Leyanis Pérez	Cuba	x	14.58	14.58	14.90	14.79	x	14.90	SB
3rd place, bronze medalist(s)	Ana Peleteiro	Spain	13.93	14.67	14.64	x	14.75	14.41	14.75	SB
4	Keturah Orji	United States	14.12	14.36	x	13.49	14.28	11.68	14.36	
5	Jasmine Moore	United States	14.15	x	14.07	13.99	13.94	x	14.15	
6	Charisma Taylor	Bahamas	13.92	13.72	13.34	13.51	14.04	14.11	14.11	SB
7	Kimberly Williams	Jamaica	13.57	13.98	14.07	x	13.88	13.79	14.07	SB
8	Ilionis Guillaume	France	x	14.01	x	13.83	13.88	x	14.01	
9	Diana Ion	Romania	13.52	13.73	13.62				13.73	
10	Elena Andreea Taloş	Romania	13.65	13.64	13.60				13.65	
11	Neja Filipič	Slovenia	13.62	x	x				13.62	
12	Kristiina Mäkelä	Finland	13.47	x	13.41				13.47	
13	Dovilė Kilty	Lithuania	13.46	x					13.46	
14	Gabriele dos Santos	Brazil	13.39	x	13.45				13.45	
	Mariko Morimoto	Japan	x	x	x				NM	
	Liadagmis Povea	Cuba							DNS	
