= Senni Salminen =

Finnish athlete (born 1996)

Personal information
- Nationality: Finnish
- Born: 29 January 1996 (age 30)

Sport
- Sport: Track and Field
- Event: triple jump
Medal record
Women's Athletics
Representing Finland
European Indoor Championships
Bronze medal – third place	2025 Apeldoorn	Triple jump

Senni Marjaana Salminen (born 29 January 1996) is a Finnish athlete who competes in the triple jump. She was a bronze medalist at the 2025 European Athletics Indoor Championships.

== Biography ==
Born in Helsinki, she competes for Imatra athletics club and is coached by former Olympian Matti Mononen.

Salminen gained her first international experience in 2015 when she took fifth place in the triple jump at the Junior European Championships in Eskilstuna with a jump of 12.98 m. In 2017, she reached eleventh place with 13.01 m at the U23 European Championships in Bydgoszcz. In 2021 she finished seventh at the European Indoor Championships in Toruń with 14.14 m.

In 2020, Salminen became the Finnish champion in the long jump outdoors and in 2021 indoors. In addition, she was triple jump indoor champion in 2020 and 2021. Salminen jumped a new Finnish record of 14.51 m at the Paavo Nurmi Games in Turku usurping the 18 year old previous record of Heli Koivula Kruger by 12 cm. With that jump she became the leading European in the year so far and surpassed the minimum for qualification to the delayed 2020 Tokyo Olympic Games.

She was named in the Finnish team for the 2024 European Athletics Championships in Rome. She competed in the triple jump at the 2024 Paris Olympics.

She won the bronze medal at the 2025 European Athletics Indoor Championships with a final jump of 13.99 metres. She jumped 13.90 metres to finish sixth in May 2025 at the 2025 Doha Diamond League. In September 2025, she competed at the 2025 World Championships in Tokyo, Japan, without advancing to the final.

In August 2026, she competed at the 2026 European Athletics Championships in Birmingham, England.

== Personal life ==
Salminen is gay and detailed in the book Love for Sport by Tiina Tuppurainen and she realised when she 15 or 16 years old but did not talk about it to anyone initially, because she had noticed that there was a lot of homophobia and stereotyping in the sports world. When she told her parents they said they had already guessed.

== Competition record ==
Year	Competition	Venue	Position	Event	Notes
Representing Finland
2015	European U20 Championships	Eskilstuna, Sweden	5th	Triple jump	12.98 m
2017	European U23 Championships	Bydgoszcz, Poland	11th	Triple jump	13.01 m
2021	European Indoor Championships	Toruń, Poland	7th	Triple jump	14.14 m
2021	Olympic Games	Tokyo, Japan	13th (q)	Triple jump	14.20 m
2022	World Championships	Eugene, United States	14th (q)	Triple jump	14.21 m
2022	European Championships	Munich, Germany	7th	Triple jump	14.13 m
2023	World Championships	Budapest, Hungary	30th (q)	Triple jump	13.50 m
2024	European Championships	Rome, Italy	21st (q)	Triple jump	13.54 m
2025	European Indoor Championships	Apeldoorn, Netherlands	3rd	Triple jump	13.99 m
2025	World Championships	Tokyo, Japan	20th (q)	Triple jump	13.77 m
2026	European Championships	Birmingham, United Kingdom	21st (q)	Triple jump	13.53 m
