= Athletics at the 1995 Pan American Games – Men's long jump =

Men's long jump at the Pan American Games

The men's long jump event at the 1995 Pan American Games was held at the Estadio Atletico "Justo Roman" on 18 and 19 March.

== Medalists ==
Gold	Silver	Bronze
Iván Pedroso; Cuba	Omar Mena; Cuba	Elmer Williams; Puerto Rico

== Results ==
=== Qualification ===
Rank	Group	Name	Nationality	Result	Notes
1	A	Iván Pedroso	Cuba	8.47w	q
2	A	Elmer Williams	Puerto Rico	7.98w	q
3	A	Jaime Jefferson	Cuba	7.84w	q
4	A	Tony Walton	United States	7.75w	q
5	A	Michael Francis	Puerto Rico	7.68w	q
6	A	Ian James	Canada	7.68w	q
7	B	Garfield Gill	Barbados	7.65w	q
8	A	Dion Bentley	United States	7.60w	q
9	A	Jérôme Romain	Dominica	7.60w	q
10	B	Nestor Madrid	Argentina	7.38w	q
11	B	Wayne McSween	Grenada	7.29w	q
12	?	Arturo Piccardo	Paraguay	7.00w	q
13	?	Vance Clarke	Saint Kitts and Nevis	6.97w	
14	?	César Ginex	Argentina	6.81w	
15	?	Lloyd Phipps-Browne	Saint Kitts and Nevis	6.61w	
	?	Rogelio Sáenz	Mexico	NM	
	?	Charles Lefrançois	Canada	DNS	

=== Final ===
Rank	Name	Nationality	#1	#2	#3	#4	#5	#6	Result	Notes
1st place, gold medalist(s)	Iván Pedroso	Cuba	8.34	8.23	8.33	8.50	x	x	8.50	
2nd place, silver medalist(s)	Jaime Jefferson	Cuba	8.23	x	x	x	x	7.82	8.23	
3rd place, bronze medalist(s)	Elmer Williams	Puerto Rico	x	7.43	8.00w	7.64	7.60	7.54	8.00w	
4	Tony Walton	United States	x	7.76	x	7.53	7.89	x	7.89	
5	Michael Francis	Puerto Rico	7.27	7.30	7.64	7.54	7.67	7.78	7.78	
6	Dion Bentley	United States	7.68	x	7.60	7.62	x	–	7.68	
7	Wayne McSween	Grenada	7.12	7.28	7.15	7.29	x	7.34	7.34	
8	Jérôme Romain	Dominica	7.13	7.19	7.30	–	–	–	7.30	
9	Nestor Madrid	Argentina	7.15	7.20	7.19				7.20	
10	Garfield Gill	Barbados	x	7.17	x				7.17	
11	Arturo Piccardo	Paraguay	5.33	6.90w	6.74				6.90w	
	Ian James	Canada							DNS	
