= Warren Lawrence =

Dominican swimmer (born 2003)

Personal information
- Nationality: Dominican
- Born: 14 May 2003 (age 21); Zurich, Switzerland
- Height: 188 cm (6 ft 2 in)
- Weight: 195 lb (88 kg)

Sport
- Sport: Swimming

Warren Adam Lawrence (born 14 May 2003) is a Dominican swimmer. He is the son of Dominica's first Olympic swimmer, Woodrow Lawrence, and qualified for the 2024 Summer Olympics.

== Biography ==
Lawrence was born on 14 May 2003. His father, Woodrow Lawrence, competed in swimming for Dominica at the 1996 Summer Olympics, the first time the country competed at the games. In 2019, Lawrence competed at the Swiss Summer Swimming National Championships in six events, including in several different styles: backstroke, butterfly stroke, freestyle and medley. In 2020, he participated at the 53th Challenge International Geneve in five events and later at the Swiss National Championships in six events.

Lawrence's 2021 season included competing at the 38th International Hi-Point Meeting, the Swiss 25m National Championships, the Swiss 50m National Championships and the Swiss Summer National Championships. He participated at several Swiss championships in 2022 and also competed in a tournament in Vienna in January that year. In July 2022, he was chosen to compete at the 2022 Commonwealth Games in five events, becoming the first-ever swimming representative from Dominica at the competition. His father served as Chef de Mission for Dominica at the games and Lawrence, although he failed to advance in any of his heats, set several personal records.

In June 2023, Lawrence competed at the Swiss Regional Championships and won two medals: a bronze medal in the 100m butterfly event and a gold in the 4×100 freestyle relay event. Afterwards, he was selected to compete at the 2023 World Aquatics Championships in two events, becoming the first-ever Dominican to compete at the competition. In the 50m freestyle, he finished sixth in his heat and 79th overall, but his time of 24.51s set both his personal record and the national Dominican record. He also competed in the 50m backstroke and placed ninth in his heat. Later that year, he competed at the Swiss Eastern Regional Championships in October, winning three medals: gold in the 50m freestyle, silver in the 50m backstroke, and bronze in the 50m butterfly. At the 2024 Swiss Long Course National Championships, he set two more national records in the 50m backstroke and 50m freestyle.

Lawrence received a universality selection and was chosen to represent Dominica at the 2024 Summer Olympics in the 50m freestyle event, becoming, along with Jasmine Schofield, the first Dominican Olympic swimmer in 24 years.
