= 2024 Summer Olympics medal table =

2024 Summer Olympics medals
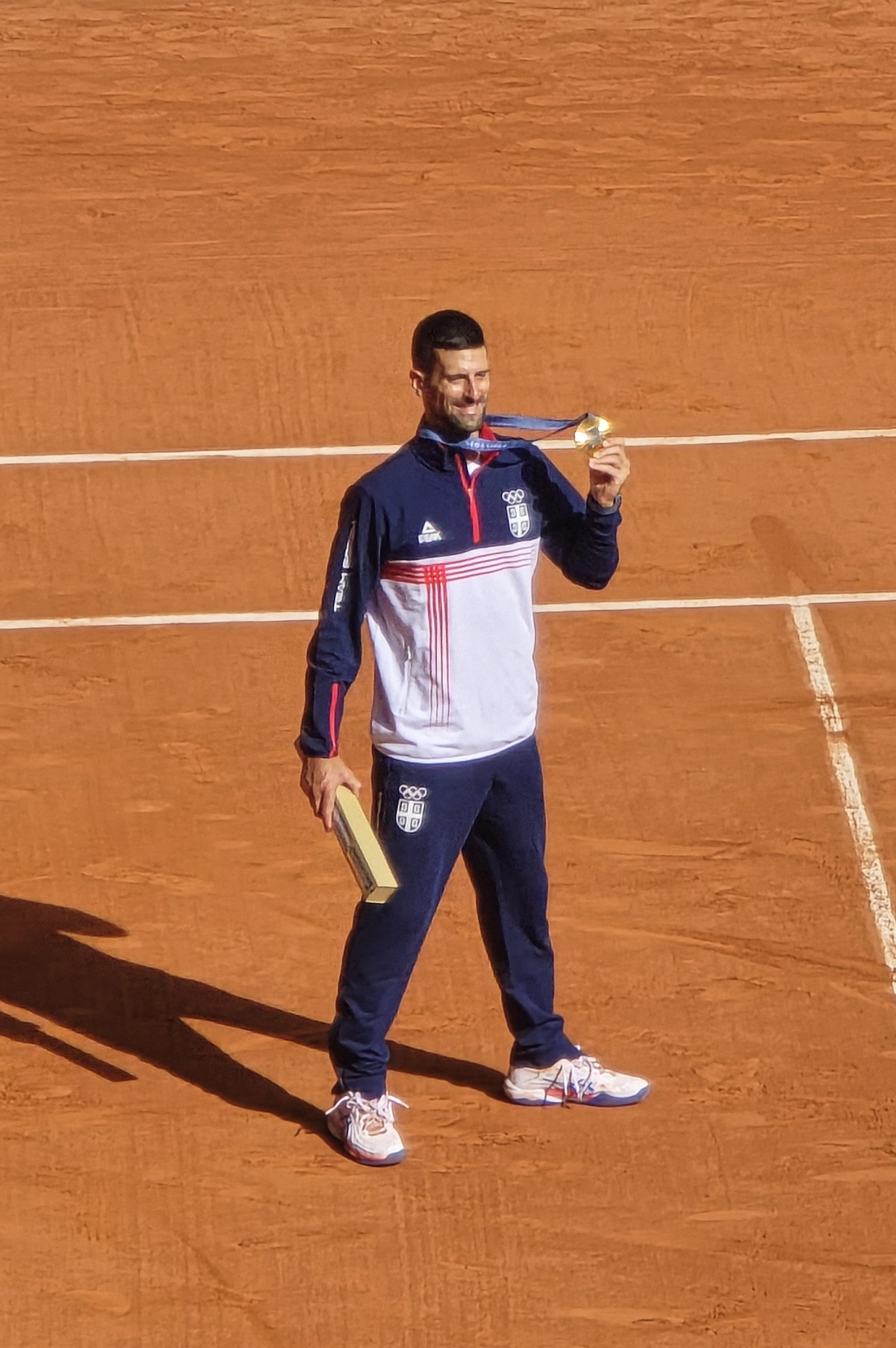
- Serbian tennis player Novak Djokovic holding the gold medal he won in the men's singles, completing the Career Golden Slam. The win also made him the oldest Olympic singles champion since tennis returned to the Games in 1988.
- Location: Paris, France

Highlights
- Most gold medals: China (40) and United States (40)
- Most total medals: United States (126)
- Medalling NOCs: 91

World map showing the medal achievements of each country during the 2024 Summer Olympics. Legend: represents countries that won at least one gold medal. represents countries that won at least one silver medal but no gold medals. represents countries that won at least one bronze medal but no gold or silver medals. represents countries that did not win any medals. represents countries that did not participate in the 2024 Summer Olympics. Notes: the Refugee Olympic Team (best medal bronze) and Individual Neutral Athletes (best medal gold) are not represented on the map.

The 2024 Summer Olympics, officially known as the Games of the XXXIII Olympiad, were an international multi-sport event held in Paris, France, from 26 July to 11 August 2024, with preliminary events in some sports beginning on 24 July. Athletes representing 206 National Olympic Committees (NOCs) participated in the games. The games featured 329 medal events across 32 sports and 48 disciplines. Breaking (breakdancing) made its Olympic debut as an optional sport, while skateboarding, sport climbing, and surfing returned to the programme, having debuted at the 2020 Summer Olympics.

Overall, individuals representing 92 NOCs received at least one medal, with 64 of them winning at least one gold medal. Botswana, Dominica, Guatemala, and Saint Lucia won their nations' first Olympic gold medals. Albania, Cape Verde, Dominica, and Saint Lucia won their nations' first Olympic medals. The Refugee Olympic Team also won their first medal.

The United States led the final medal table for the fourth consecutive Summer Games, with 40 gold and 126 total medals, while China finished second with 40 gold and 91 medals in total. The occasion marked the first time a gold medal tie among the two most successful nations has occurred in Summer Olympics history. Among individual participants, Chinese swimmer Zhang Yufei won the most medals at the games with six (one silver, five bronze), while French swimmer Léon Marchand had the most gold medals with four.

== Medals ==
Paris 2024 Organizing Committee President Tony Estanguet unveiled the Olympic and Paralympic medals for the Games in February 2024, which on the obverse featured embedded hexagon-shaped tokens of scrap iron that had been taken from the original construction of the Eiffel Tower, with the Games' logo engraved into it. Approximately 5,084 medals were produced by the French mint Monnaie de Paris, and designed by Chaumet, a luxury jewellery firm based in Paris.

The reverse of the medals featured Nike, the Greek goddess of victory, inside the Panathenaic Stadium which hosted the first modern Olympics in 1896. The Parthenon and the Eiffel Tower could also be seen in the background on both sides of the medal. Each medal weighed 455–529 g (16–19 oz), had a diameter of 85 mm (3.3 in) and was 9.2 mm (0.36 in) thick. The gold medals were made with 98.8 percent silver and 1.13 percent gold, while the bronze medals were made up with copper, zinc, and tin.

== Medal table ==
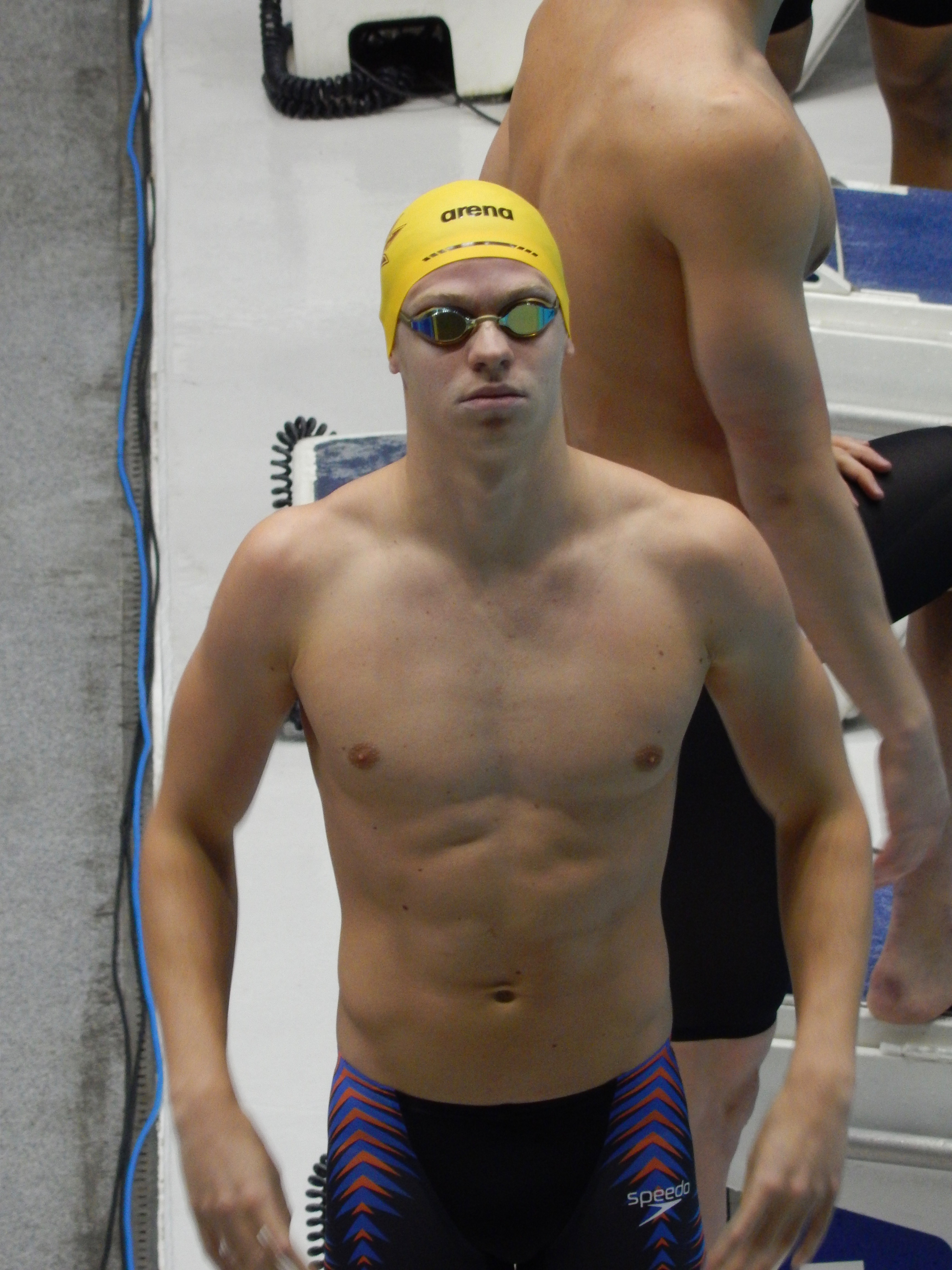
French swimmer Léon Marchand won four gold medals at the 2024 Summer Olympics, the most of any competing athlete.

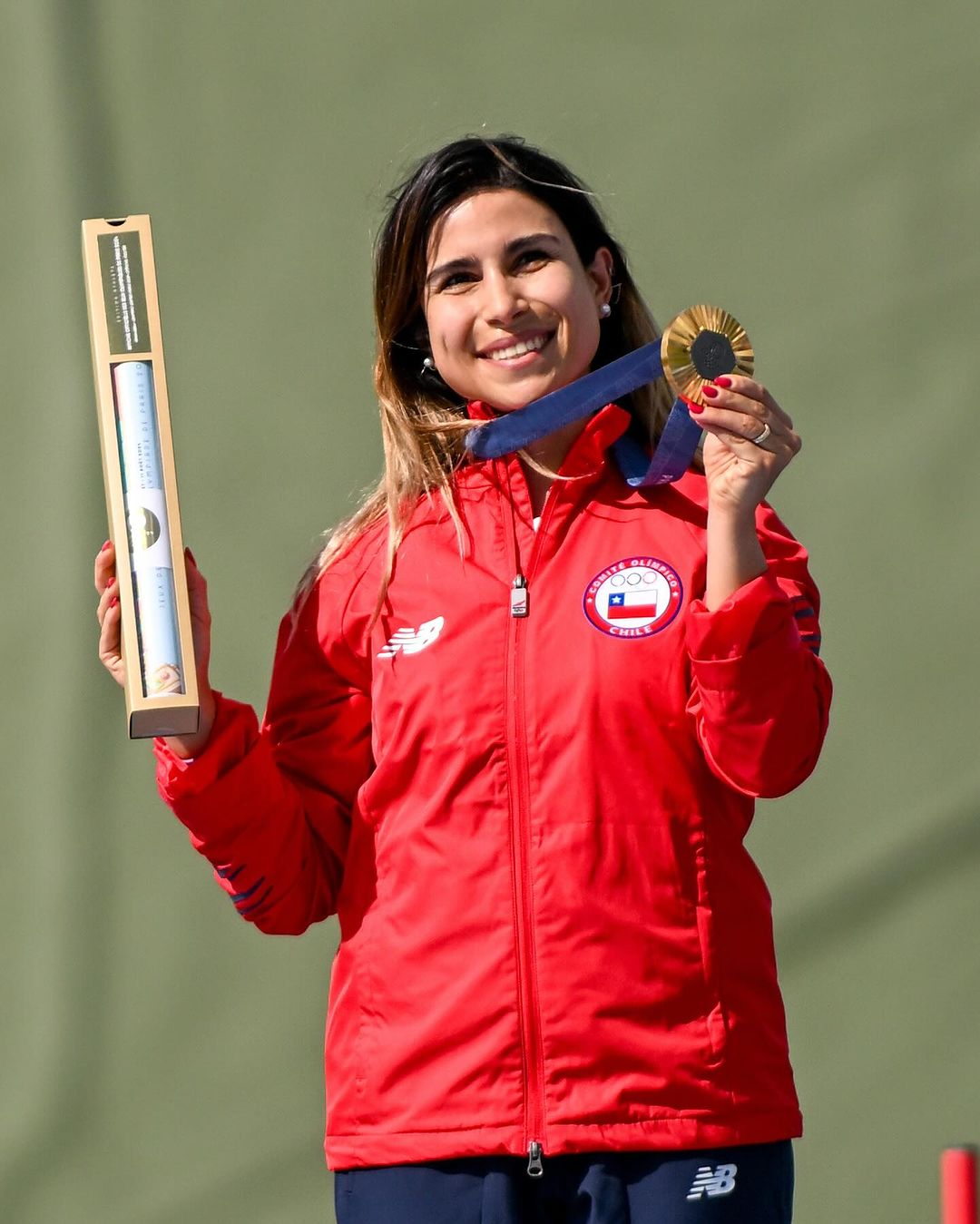
Chilean sport shooter Francisca Crovetto holding the gold medal she won in the women's skeet, as well as a box with an official poster given to all medalists

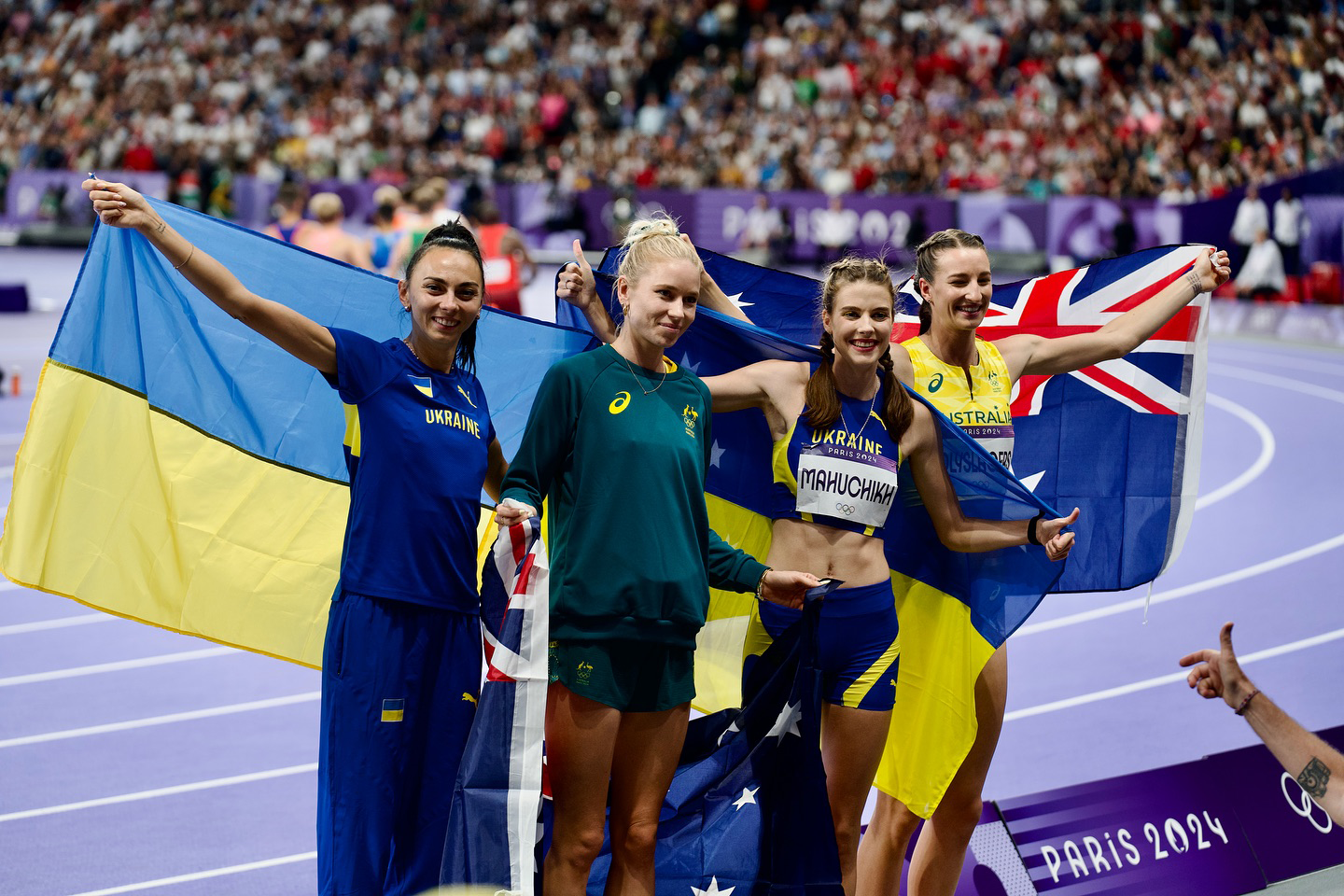
Women's high jump medallists from left to right: Iryna Herashchenko (Ukraine, bronze), Eleanor Patterson (Australia, bronze), Yaroslava Mahuchikh (Ukraine, gold), and Nicola Olyslagers (Australia, silver).

The medal table is based on information provided by the International Olympic Committee (IOC) and is consistent with IOC conventional sorting in its published medal tables. The table uses the Olympic medal table sorting method. By default, the table is ordered by the number of gold medals the athletes from a nation have won, where a nation is an entity represented by a NOC. The number of silver medals is taken into consideration next and then the number of bronze medals. If teams are still tied, equal ranking is given and they are listed alphabetically by their IOC country code.

Events in boxing result in a bronze medal being awarded to each of the two competitors who lose their semi-final matches, as opposed to fighting in a third place tiebreaker. Other combat sports, which include judo, taekwondo, and wrestling, use a repechage system which also results in two bronze medals being awarded.

In the men's 100 m breaststroke, two silver medals and no bronze medal were awarded due to a tie; in the women's high jump, men's horizontal bar, and women's K-2 500 metres, two bronze medals were awarded due to ties.

Key

‡ Changes in medal standings (see here)

* Host nation (France)

2024 Summer Olympics medal table (Note: Although the IOC does not include Individual Neutral Athletes (Note: Individual Neutral Athletes is the name used to represent approved individual Belarusian and Russian athletes at the 2024 Summer Olympics, after the IOC suspended the Russian Olympic Committee and Belarus Olympic Committee due to the Russian invasion of Ukraine. The IOC country code is AIN, after the French name Athlètes Individuels Neutres.) in the official medal tables, they are listed here for comparison purposes.) (Note: Figures in table reflect all official changes in medal standings.)
| Rank | NOC | Gold | Silver | Bronze | Total |
|---|---|---|---|---|---|
| 1 | United States‡ | 40 | 44 | 42 | 126 |
| 2 | China | 40 | 27 | 24 | 91 |
| 3 | Japan | 20 | 12 | 13 | 45 |
| 4 | Australia | 18 | 19 | 16 | 53 |
| 5 | France* | 16 | 26 | 22 | 64 |
| 6 | Netherlands | 15 | 7 | 12 | 34 |
| 7 | Great Britain | 14 | 22 | 29 | 65 |
| 8 | South Korea | 13 | 9 | 10 | 32 |
| 9 | Italy | 12 | 13 | 15 | 40 |
| 10 | Germany | 12 | 13 | 8 | 33 |
| 11 | New Zealand | 10 | 7 | 3 | 20 |
| 12 | Canada | 9 | 7 | 11 | 27 |
| 13 | Uzbekistan | 8 | 2 | 3 | 13 |
| 14 | Hungary | 6 | 7 | 6 | 19 |
| 15 | Spain | 5 | 4 | 9 | 18 |
| 16 | Sweden | 4 | 4 | 3 | 11 |
| 17 | Kenya | 4 | 2 | 5 | 11 |
| 18 | Norway | 4 | 1 | 3 | 8 |
| 19 | Ireland | 4 | 0 | 3 | 7 |
| 20 | Brazil | 3 | 7 | 10 | 20 |
| 21 | Iran | 3 | 6 | 3 | 12 |
| 22 | Ukraine | 3 | 5 | 4 | 12 |
| 23 | Romania‡ | 3 | 4 | 2 | 9 |
| 24 | Georgia | 3 | 3 | 1 | 7 |
| 25 | Belgium | 3 | 1 | 6 | 10 |
| 26 | Bulgaria | 3 | 1 | 3 | 7 |
| 27 | Serbia | 3 | 1 | 1 | 5 |
| 28 | Czech Republic | 3 | 0 | 2 | 5 |
| 29 | Denmark | 2 | 2 | 5 | 9 |
| 30 | Azerbaijan | 2 | 2 | 3 | 7 |
| 30 | Croatia | 2 | 2 | 3 | 7 |
| 32 | Cuba | 2 | 1 | 6 | 9 |
| 33 | Bahrain | 2 | 1 | 1 | 4 |
| 34 | Slovenia | 2 | 1 | 0 | 3 |
| 35 | Chinese Taipei | 2 | 0 | 5 | 7 |
| 36 | Austria | 2 | 0 | 3 | 5 |
| 37 | Hong Kong | 2 | 0 | 2 | 4 |
| 37 | Philippines | 2 | 0 | 2 | 4 |
| 39 | Algeria | 2 | 0 | 1 | 3 |
| 39 | Indonesia | 2 | 0 | 1 | 3 |
| 41 | Israel | 1 | 5 | 1 | 7 |
| 42 | Poland | 1 | 4 | 5 | 10 |
| 43 | Kazakhstan | 1 | 3 | 3 | 7 |
| 44 | Jamaica | 1 | 3 | 2 | 6 |
| 44 | South Africa | 1 | 3 | 2 | 6 |
| 44 | Thailand | 1 | 3 | 2 | 6 |
| – | Individual Neutral Athletes | 1 | 3 | 1 | 5 |
| 47 | Ethiopia | 1 | 3 | 0 | 4 |
| 48 | Switzerland | 1 | 2 | 5 | 8 |
| 49 | Ecuador | 1 | 2 | 2 | 5 |
| 50 | Portugal | 1 | 2 | 1 | 4 |
| 51 | Greece | 1 | 1 | 6 | 8 |
| 52 | Argentina | 1 | 1 | 1 | 3 |
| 52 | Egypt | 1 | 1 | 1 | 3 |
| 52 | Tunisia | 1 | 1 | 1 | 3 |
| 55 | Botswana | 1 | 1 | 0 | 2 |
| 55 | Chile | 1 | 1 | 0 | 2 |
| 55 | Saint Lucia | 1 | 1 | 0 | 2 |
| 55 | Uganda | 1 | 1 | 0 | 2 |
| 59 | Dominican Republic | 1 | 0 | 2 | 3 |
| 60 | Guatemala | 1 | 0 | 1 | 2 |
| 60 | Morocco | 1 | 0 | 1 | 2 |
| 62 | Dominica | 1 | 0 | 0 | 1 |
| 62 | Pakistan | 1 | 0 | 0 | 1 |
| 64 | Turkey | 0 | 3 | 5 | 8 |
| 65 | Mexico | 0 | 3 | 2 | 5 |
| 66 | Armenia | 0 | 3 | 1 | 4 |
| 66 | Colombia | 0 | 3 | 1 | 4 |
| 68 | Kyrgyzstan | 0 | 2 | 4 | 6 |
| 68 | North Korea | 0 | 2 | 4 | 6 |
| 70 | Lithuania | 0 | 2 | 2 | 4 |
| 71 | India | 0 | 1 | 5 | 6 |
| 72 | Moldova | 0 | 1 | 3 | 4 |
| 73 | Kosovo | 0 | 1 | 1 | 2 |
| 74 | Cyprus | 0 | 1 | 0 | 1 |
| 74 | Fiji | 0 | 1 | 0 | 1 |
| 74 | Jordan | 0 | 1 | 0 | 1 |
| 74 | Mongolia | 0 | 1 | 0 | 1 |
| 74 | Panama | 0 | 1 | 0 | 1 |
| 79 | Tajikistan | 0 | 0 | 3 | 3 |
| 80 | Albania | 0 | 0 | 2 | 2 |
| 80 | Grenada | 0 | 0 | 2 | 2 |
| 80 | Malaysia | 0 | 0 | 2 | 2 |
| 80 | Puerto Rico | 0 | 0 | 2 | 2 |
| 84 | Cape Verde | 0 | 0 | 1 | 1 |
| 84 | Ivory Coast | 0 | 0 | 1 | 1 |
| 84 | Peru | 0 | 0 | 1 | 1 |
| 84 | Qatar | 0 | 0 | 1 | 1 |
| 84 | Refugee Olympic Team | 0 | 0 | 1 | 1 |
| 84 | Singapore | 0 | 0 | 1 | 1 |
| 84 | Slovakia | 0 | 0 | 1 | 1 |
| 84 | Zambia | 0 | 0 | 1 | 1 |
| Totals (91 entries) | | 329 | 330 | 385 | 1,044 |

== Changes in medal standings ==
List of official changes in medal standings
| Ruling date | Event | Athlete (NOC) | 1st place, gold medalist(s) | 2nd place, silver medalist(s) | 3rd place, bronze medalist(s) | Net change | Comment |
|---|---|---|---|---|---|---|---|
| 11 August 2024 | Gymnastics, women's floor | Jordan Chiles (USA) | | | −1 | −1 | The Romanian Olympic and Sports Committee appealed the scores in the women's floor event to the Court of Arbitration for Sport, which overturned it. As a result, Romanian Ana Bărbosu moved up to the bronze medal position, while American Jordan Chiles was demoted to fifth. |
| 11 August 2024 | Gymnastics, women's floor | Ana Bărbosu (ROM) | | | +1 | +1 | The Romanian Olympic and Sports Committee appealed the scores in the women's floor event to the Court of Arbitration for Sport, which overturned it. As a result, Romanian Ana Bărbosu moved up to the bronze medal position, while American Jordan Chiles was demoted to fifth. |

== See also ==
- All-time Olympic Games medal table
- 2024 Summer Paralympics medal table
- List of 2024 Summer Olympics medal winners
