= Woodrow Lawrence =

Dominica swimmer (born 1966)

Personal information
- Born: September 2, 1966 (age 59) Dominica

Sport
- Sport: Swimming
- Strokes: Freestyle

Woodrow "Woody" Lawrence (born September 2, 1966) is a Dominican swimmer. He participated at the 1996 Summer Olympics in Atlanta and finished 60th out of 63 competitors in the 50 metre freestyle with a time of 27.88 seconds. His son Warren Lawrence will participate at the 2024 Summer Olympics.
