= Ilionis Guillaume =

French triple jumper (born 1998)

Personal information
- Nationality: French
- Born: 14 November 1998 (age 27) Croix-des-Bouquets, Haiti
- Height: 180 cm (5 ft 11 in)
- Weight: 67 kg (148 lb)

Sport
- Country: France
- Sport: Athletics
- Event: Triple jump

Achievements and titles
- Personal bests: 14.59m (Guadalajara, 2024)
Medal record
Women's athletics
Representing France
European Championships
| Bronze medal – third place | 2024 Rome | Triple jump |
European U20 Championships
| Silver medal – second place | 2017 Grosseto | Triple jump |

Ilionis Guillaume (born 13 January 1998) is a French track and field athlete who is a twice national indoor champion in the triple jump. She was a bronze medalist at the 2024 European Athletics Championships and competed at the 2024 Olympic Games.

== Early life ==
She was born in Port-au-Prince, Haiti. She moved to Montpellier in France at the age of five years-old and began participating in athletics at the age of seven years-old. She was a successful junior athlete winning French national indoor titles in 60m hurdles, triple jump, high jump and long jump.

== Career ==
She was runner-up at the 2017 European Athletics U20 Championships in Grosseto, Italy. The following year, she won the French Athletics Indoor Championships in the triple jump, with a new personal best of 14.07 metres in February 2018.

She was runner-up at the French Athletics Championships in the triple jump in 2020.

She won another national title at the 2023 French Indoor Athletics Championships in Aubiere. She competed for France at the 2023 European Athletics Team Championships in Chorzów, Poland.

She competed for France at the 2024 World Athletics Indoor Championships in Glasgow, Scotland. She finished in eighth place with a best distance of 14.01 metres.

She won the bronze medal at the 2024 European Athletics Championships in Rome, Italy, winning the medal with her final jump, a new personal best distance of 14.43 metres. She competed in the triple jump at the 2024 Paris Olympics, jumping 14.05 metres to qualify for the final and placing twelfth overall with a best jump of 13.78 metres in the final.

She was selected for the 2025 European Athletics Indoor Championships in Appeldoorn, finishing sixth in the final with a best jump of 13.54 metres. She jumped 14.20 metres to finish third in May 2025 at the 2025 Doha Diamond League. In September 2025, she competed at the 2025 World Championships in Tokyo, Japan, without advancing to the final.

On 25 July 2026, she jumped 14.14 metres to win the triple jump at the 2026 French Championships. In August, she competed at the 2026 European Athletics Championships in Birmingham, England.
