= Diana Ana Maria Ion =

Romanian athlete (born 2000)

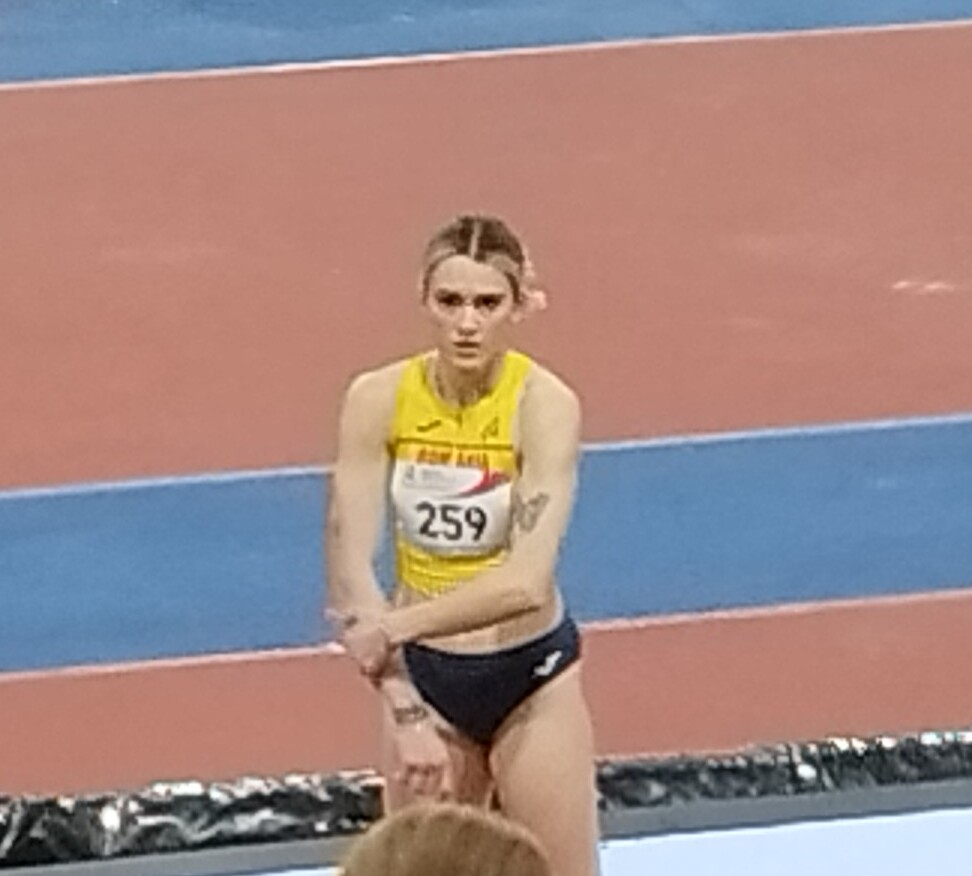
- Diana Ana Maria Ion at Balkan Indoor Championship in Belgrade 2026.

Personal information
- Nationality: Romanian
- Born: 27 November 2000 (age 25)

Sport
- Sport: Athletics
- Event: Triple jump

Achievements and titles
- Personal bests: Triple jump: 14.23 (Rome, 2024)
Medal record
Women's Athletics
Representing Romania
European Indoor Championships
Silver medal – second place	2025 Apeldoorn	Triple jump
Jeux de la Francophonie
Bronze medal – third place	2023 Kinshasa	Triple jump

Diana Ana Maria Ion (born 27 November 2000) is a Romanian triple jumper. She became Romanian national champion in 2023. She was a silver medalist at the 2025 European Athletics Indoor Championships.

== Biography ==
A member of CSM Oneşti and coached by Cornel Grigore, in July 2021 she finished sixth at the 2021 European Athletics U23 Championships in Tallinn with a jump of 13.27 metres.

Ion was runner-up at the Romanian Athletics Indoor Championships in 2022 with a jump of 13.57 metres. She then became Romanian triple jump champion in July 2023 in Craiova.

Ion competed for Romania at the 2023 European Athletics Team Championships in Silesia in June 2023. She was a bronze medalist at the 2023 Francophone Games in Kinshasa. She competed at the 2023 World Athletics Championships in Budapest where she had a best jump of 13.66 metres.

At the 2024 World Athletics Indoor Championships in Glasgow in March 2024, she finished in ninth place with a jump of 13.73 metres.

At the 2024 European Athletics Championships in Rome in June 2024, she achieved her a personal best 14.23 metres to finish in fifth place overall.

She competed in the triple jump at the 2024 Paris Olympics, and placed 13th in qualifiers with a jump of 14.03 meters, missing qualification for the final by two centimetres.

In February 2025, she won the Romanian Indoor Athletics Championships ahead of Alexia Ioana Dospin. She won a silver medal at the 2025 European Athletics Indoor Championships in Apeldoorn, with a distance of 14.31 metres. She competed at the 2025 World Athletics Indoor Championships in Nanjing, China later that same month and finished in ninth place with a jump of 13.66 metres. In September 2025, she competed at the 2025 World Championships in Tokyo, Japan, without advancing to the final.

With a jump of 13.84 metres she placed second at the 2026 Romanian Indoor Championships. In August 2026, she competed at the 2026 European Athletics Championships in Birmingham, England.
