= Sherwin James =

Dominican athletics competitor (born 1978)

Personal information
- Born: 6 June 1978 (age 47) Saint Patrick Parish, Dominica

Sport
- Sport: Track and field

Sherwin Eric James (born 6 June 1978) is a retired track and field Olympic athlete who represented Dominica.

He competed at the 2000 Summer Olympics in the men's 200 metres where he finished eighth in his heat so failing to advance, he also competed at the 1999 World Championships in Athletics and 2001 World Championships in Athletics.
