= Athletics at the 2024 Summer Olympics – Women's triple jump =

Women's triple jump at the Games of the XXXIII Olympiad
- Venue: Stade de France, Paris, France
- Date: 2 August 2024 (qualification) 3 August 2024 (final)
- Competitors: 31 from 22 nations
- Winning time: 15.02 m

Medalists
1st place, gold medalist(s)		Thea LaFond	Dominica
2nd place, silver medalist(s)		Shanieka Ricketts	Jamaica
3rd place, bronze medalist(s)		Jasmine Moore	United States

The women's triple jump at the 2024 Summer Olympics was held in Paris, France, on 2 and 3 August 2024. This was the eighth time that the event was contested at the Summer Olympics. It was won by Thea LaFond of Dominica, giving Dominica its first ever Olympic medal.

== Summary ==
Since the 2017 World Championships, Yulimar Rojas has won every major championship. However, she missed the 2024 Olympics after undergoing surgery to repair an achilles injury incurred during a training session in Spain in April 2024. With Rojas out for the season, this opened the door for other athletes.

With silver at three major championships Shanieka Ricketts, tied for #21 all time seemed the likely candidate. Ana Peleteiro, the returning bronze medalist was also in the competition. Maryna Bekh-Romanchuk was the silver medalist at the most recent World Championships ahead of Leyanis Pérez. Earlier in the year, Thea LaFond won the World Indoor Championship over Pérez and Peleteiro.

Liadagmis Povea, Jasmine Moore, Peleteiro and Ricketts beat the automatic qualifier on their first attempt. Dariya Derkach and LaFond hit it exactly both on their second attempt. Pérez took all three attempts to pound out the best qualifier 14.68m. Bekh-Romanchuk was the next best non-automatic qualifier.

Peleteiro started off the final with 14.55m. That held up through the round until the last two jumpers, Ricketts taking the lead with 14.61m until the last jumper, Pérez, went a centimeter further. The second round got serious. Moore stepped into the lead with a 14.67m which lasted two jumps until LaFond blasted a PB 15.02 m (49 ft 3 1/4 in). Dropped to fourth place, Ricketts improved to 14.87m to move into silver position. And the rain came. Peleteiro improved to 14.59 in the fourth round, Povea improved to 14.64m in the fifth, but neither reached Moore. LaFond was the first medal winner of any kind for the island nation of Dominica with a population barely over 70,000. Her winning mark improved her own National Record and moved her into a tie with Bekh-Romanchuk as #24 of all time.

== Records ==
Global records before the 2024 Summer Olympics
Record	Athlete (Nation)	Distance (m)	Location	Date
World record	Yulimar Rojas (VEN)	15.74	Belgrade, Serbia	20 March 2022
Olympic record	Yulimar Rojas (VEN)	15.67	Tokyo, Japan	1 August 2021
World leading	Thea LaFond (DMA)	15.01	Glasgow, Great Britain	3 March 2024

Area records before the 2024 Summer Olympics
Area Record	Athlete (Nation)	Distance (m)
Africa (records)	Françoise Mbango Etone (CMR)	15.39
Asia (records)	Olga Rypakova (KAZ)	15.25
Europe (records)	Inessa Kravets (UKR)	15.50
North, Central America and Caribbean (records)	Yamilé Aldama (CUB)	15.29
Oceania (records)	Nicole Mladenis (AUS)	14.04
South America (records)	Yulimar Rojas (VEN)	15.74 WR

== Qualification ==
For the women's triple jump event, the qualification period was between 1 July 2023 and 30 June 2024. 32 athletes were able to qualify for the event, with a maximum of three athletes per nation, by jumping the entry standard of 14.55 m or further or by their World Athletics Ranking for this event.

== Results ==
=== Qualifying round ===
Progression rules: Qualifying performance 14.35 (Q) or at least 12 best performers (q) advance to the Final.

Rank	Group	Athlete	Nation	1	2	3	Distance	Notes
1	B	Leyanis Pérez	Cuba	x	14.29	14.68	14.68	Q
2	B	Shanieka Ricketts	Jamaica	14.47	—	—	14.47	Q
3	A	Jasmine Moore	United States	14.43	—	—	14.43	Q, SB
4	A	Liadagmis Povea	Cuba	14.39	—	—	14.39	Q
5	B	Ana Peleteiro	Spain	14.36	—	—	14.36	Q
6	B	Dariya Derkach	Italy	14.19	14.35	—	14.35	Q, SB
7	A	Thea LaFond	Dominica	x	14.35	—	14.35	Q
8	A	Maryna Bekh-Romanchuk	Ukraine	14.30	x	14.09	14.30	q
9	B	Elena Andreea Taloș	Romania	x	14.23	14.21	14.23	q
10	A	Ackelia Smith	Jamaica	14.08	13.98	14.09	14.09	q
11	B	Keturah Orji	United States	13.58	x	14.09	14.09	q
12	B	Ilionis Guillaume	France	13.82	13.58	14.05	14.05	q
13	A	Diana Ana Maria Ion	Romania	x	x	14.03	14.03	
14	B	Tori Franklin	United States	13.84	14.02	13.82	14.02	
15	B	Charisma Taylor	Bahamas	14.01	13.98	13.71	14.01	
16	A	Tuğba Danışmaz	Turkey	x	13.97	13.95	13.97	
17	A	Saly Sarr	Senegal	x	13.96	11.72	13.96	
18	A	Neja Filipič	Slovenia	13.75	13.78	13.85	13.85	
19	A	Maja Åskag	Sweden	13.79	13.63	x	13.79	
20	B	Kimberley Williams	Jamaica	13.77	13.09	13.76	13.77	
21	A	Gabriela Petrova	Bulgaria	13.77	x	13.67	13.77	
22	B	Rūta Kate Lasmane	Latvia	13.76	11.43	13.54	13.76	
23	B	Sharifa Davronova	Uzbekistan	13.74	x	13.55	13.74	
24	B	Zeng Rui	China	13.03	13.69	13.36	13.69	
25	A	Dovilè Kilty	Lithuania	13.63	13.51	13.64	13.64	
26	A	Ottavia Cestonaro	Italy	13.63	x	13.48	13.63	SB
27	A	Gabriele dos Santos	Brazil	x	13.63	13.48	13.63	
28	B	Mariko Morimoto	Japan	x	13.40	13.19	13.40	
29	B	Olha Korsun	Ukraine	13.06	x	x	13.06	
30	B	Diana Zagainova	Lithuania	x	x	12.86	12.86	
	A	Senni Salminen	Finland				DNS	

=== Final ===
Rank	Athlete	Nation	1	2	3	4	5	6	Distance	Notes
1st place, gold medalist(s)	Thea LaFond	Dominica	14.32	15.02	14.46	14.12	14.43	—	15.02	NR
2nd place, silver medalist(s)	Shanieka Ricketts	Jamaica	14.61	14.87	x	x	x	14.73	14.87	SB
3rd place, bronze medalist(s)	Jasmine Moore	United States	x	14.67	x	14.16	x	x	14.67	SB
4	Liadagmis Povea	Cuba	14.28	x	14.39	14.25	14.64	14.56	14.64	
5	Leyanis Pérez	Cuba	14.62	14.12	14.50	14.37	14.42	x	14.62	
6	Ana Peleteiro	Spain	14.55	13.73	14.52	14.59	14.26	14.31	14.59	
7	Ackelia Smith	Jamaica	13.88	x	14.15	13.86	13.91	14.42	14.42	
8	Dariya Derkach	Italy	14.14	14.08	13.79	x	x	13.79	14.14	
9	Keturah Orji	United States	13.97	x	14.05	Did not advance			14.05	
10	Elena Andreea Taloș	Romania	x	x	14.03	Did not advance			14.03	
11	Maryna Bekh-Romanchuk	Ukraine	x	x	13.98	Did not advance			13.98	
12	Ilionis Guillaume	France	x	13.78	x	Did not advance			13.78	
