= Hermin Joseph =

Dominican sprinter

Hermin Joseph (born 1964) is a retired Dominican sprinter. She was the first woman to represent Dominica at the Olympics.

Her greatest international achievement was a sixth place at the 1994 Commonwealth Games in Victoria, British Columbia, Canada. At the World Championships she reached the quarter-finals of the 200 metres competition in 1993 and of the 100 metres competition in 1995.

She also competed at the 1996 Summer Olympics, which was the first Olympic participation of the Caribbean country.
