= Dennick Luke =

Dominican middle-distance runner

Personal information
- Born: 28 January 2001 (age 25) Portsmouth, Dominica
- Height: 1.88 m (6 ft 2 in)
- Weight: 73 kg (161 lb)

Sport
- Sport: Athletics
- Event: 800 m

Achievements and titles
- Personal bests: 200m: 21.97 (Kingston, 2024); 400m: 45.75 (Kingston, 2026); 400mH: 48.37 NR (Kingston, 2026); 800m: 1:46.81 NR (Paris, 2024); 1500m: 4:08.74 (Kingston, 2020)
Medal record
Men's athletics
Representing Dominica
NACAC U-23 Championships
Bronze medal – third place	2023 San José	800 meters

Dennick Luke (born 28 January 2001) is a Dominican middle-distance runner and hurdler. He ran the national record in the 800 metres at the 2024 Olympic Games. He ran the national record in the 400 metres hurdles at the 2025 NACAC Championships.

== Biography ==
Dennick was selected to compete at the 2020 Summer Olympics in the 800 metres. He was also given the honour of being the flag bearer for his nation in the opening ceremony. In the race itself, Luke finished eighth in his qualifying heat after falling to the ground after being clipped by another athlete. He finished in a time of 1.54:30.

Luke's personal best on 800 m is also the national record. He ran 1:48.22 at the National Stadium, Kingston, Jamaica on 11 June 2022, breaking the 11-year-old record of Erison Hurtault, who ran 1:48.60 in 2011. Luke competed at the 2022 Commonwealth Games in Birmingham, England, finishing sixth in his 800m heat in a time of 1:50.06. He was a bronze medalist in the 800 metres at the 2023 NACAC U23 Championships in Costa Rica.

He competed in the 800 metres at the 2024 Summer Olympics in Paris in August 2024, where he ran a new national record time of 1:46.81.

He ran the national record in the 400 metres hurdles of 48.82 seconds in placing fourth overall at the 2025 NACAC Championships in Freeport, The Bahamas in August 2025. He competed at the 2025 World Athletics Championships in the men's 400 metres hurdles in Tokyo, Japan, in September 2025, running 49.32 without reaching the semi-finals.

In June 2026, he ran 49.21 seconds to place fourth in the inaugural 400 metres hurdles final at the 2026 Pan American Championships in Athletics in Medellín. In July, he competed in the 400 metres hurdles at the 2026 Commonwealth Games in Glasgow, Scotland, reaching the final and placing fourth overall.

Olympic Games
Preceded by Yordanys Durañona	Flag bearer for Dominica; Tokyo 2020; Paris 2024 with Thea LaFond	Succeeded by Incumbent
