= Dominica Amateur Athletic Association =

Governing body for athletics in Dominica

- Sport: Athletics
- Jurisdiction: Association
- Abbreviation: DAAA
- Founded: 1985
- Affiliation: IAAF
- Affiliation date: 1986
- Regional affiliation: NACAC
- Headquarters: Roseau
- President: Godwin Dorsette
- Vice president: Walson pacquette
- Secretary: Phillip White

Official website
- www.daaa.dm
- (Dominica)

The Dominica Amateur Athletic Association (DAAA) is the governing body for the sport of athletics in the Commonwealth of Dominica. Current president is Godwin Dorsette. He was elected in December 2015.

== History ==
DAAA was founded in 1985, and was affiliated to the IAAF in 1986.

== Affiliations ==
DAAA is the national member federation for Dominica in the following international organisations:

- International Association of Athletics Federations (IAAF)
- North American, Central American and Caribbean Athletic Association (NACAC)
- Association of Panamerican Athletics (APA)
- Central American and Caribbean Athletic Confederation (CACAC)

Moreover, it is part of the following national organisations:

- Dominica Olympic Committee (DOC)

== National records ==
DAAA maintains the Dominica records in athletics.
