= Jérôme Romain =

Personal information
- Born: June 12, 1971 (age 55) Saint-Martin, France

Sport
- Sport: Track and field
- Club: Arkansas Razorbacks
Medal record
Men's athletics
Representing Dominica
Pan American Games
Silver medal – second place	1995 Mar del Plata	Triple jump
World Championships
Bronze medal – third place	1995 Gothenburg	Triple jump
CARIFTA Games Junior (U20)
Silver medal – second place	1988 Kingston	Triple jump
Bronze medal – third place	1988 Kingston	Long jump

Jérôme Romain (born June 12, 1971) is a former world-class track and field athlete who competed mainly in the triple jump.

Born on Saint-Martin, a French overseas territory in the Caribbean, Romain represented Dominica before 1999, and France thereafter.

Romain competed collegiately for Blinn College and the University of Arkansas. He graduated from Arkansas in 1996 with a bachelor's degree in kinesiology/athletic training. He received his master's degree in kinesiology/exercise science from Arkansas in 2000.

Romain was the assistant coach for jumps at the University of Wisconsin–Madison for four years following his graduation. He then became the jumps coach at Brown University in Providence, Rhode Island.

In 2008, Romain was selected to coach the Dominica track and field team at the 2008 Summer Olympics in Beijing. In addition, he was given the honor of carrying the national flag at the Opening Ceremonies. Romain is an assistant jumps coach at the University of Tennessee.

== Competition record ==
Year	Competition	Venue	Position	Event	Notes
Representing Dominica
1989	CARIFTA Games (U20)	Bridgetown, Barbados	3rd	Long jump	7.27 m
1989	CARIFTA Games (U20)	Bridgetown, Barbados	2nd	Triple jump	15.06 m
1991	World Championships	Tokyo, Japan	64th (h)	100 m	11.09
1991	World Championships	Tokyo, Japan	33rd (q)	Triple jump	15.49 m
1993	World Championships	Stuttgart, Germany	28th (q)	Long jump	7.62 m
1993	World Championships	Stuttgart, Germany	11th	Triple jump	16.98 m
1994	Jeux de la Francophonie	Bondoufle, France	2nd	Long jump	7.81 m
1994	Commonwealth Games	Victoria, Canada	7th	Long jump	7.69 m
1994	Commonwealth Games	Victoria, Canada	4th	Triple jump	16.61 m
1995	Pan American Games	Mar del Plata, Argentina	8th	Long jump	7.30 m
1995	Pan American Games	Mar del Plata, Argentina	2nd	Triple jump	17.24 m
1995	Central American and Caribbean Championships	Guatemala City, Guatemala	2nd	Long jump	7.66 m (A)
1995	Central American and Caribbean Championships	Guatemala City, Guatemala	1st	Triple jump	16.80 m (A)
1995	World Championships	Gothenburg, Sweden	3rd	Triple jump	17.59 m
1996	Olympic Games	Atlanta, United States	12th	Triple jump	NM
1997	World Indoor Championships	Paris, France	9th	Triple jump	16.52 m
1997	Central American and Caribbean Championships	San Juan, Puerto Rico	1st	Triple jump	17.53 m (w)
1997	World Championships	Athens, Greece	6th	Triple jump	17.17 m
1998	Goodwill Games	Uniondale, United States	6th	Triple jump	16.84 m
Representing France
1999	World Championships	Seville, Spain	7th	Triple jump	17.10 m
2000	European Indoor Championships	Ghent, Belgium	9th (q)	Triple jump	16.45 m
2001	Jeux de la Francophonie	Ottawa, Canada	2nd	Triple jump	16.29 m
2002	European Indoor Championships	Vienna, Austria	9th (q)	Triple jump	16.51 m

== Personal bests ==
Outdoor

- Triple jump - 17.59 m (1995)
- Long jump - 7.90 m (1993)
- 100 metres - 10.70 (1992)

Indoor

- Triple jump - 17.03 m (1998)

== World rankings ==
Romain was ranked among the top ten triple jumpers in the world by Track and Field News on four occasions:

Year	Event	Ranking
1995	Triple jump	4th
1997	Triple jump	8th
1998	Triple jump	8th
1999	Triple jump	9th

Olympic Games
Preceded by First; Chris Lloyd	Flagbearer for Dominica; Atlanta 1996; Beijing 2008	Succeeded by Marcia Daniel; Erison Hurtault
