= Yordanys Durañona =

Cuban-Dominican triple jumper

Personal information
- Full name: Yordanys Durañona García
- Born: 16 June 1988 (age 38) Havana, Cuba
- Height: 1.85 m (6 ft 1 in)
- Weight: 83 kg (183 lb)

Sport
- Country: Cuba; Dominica
- Sport: Athletics
- Event: Triple jump

Achievements and titles
- Personal best: Triple jump: 17.20 (2014)
- Updated on 29 August 2015

Yordanys Durañona García (born 16 June 1988) is a Cuban-born triple jumper, who competed internationally for Dominica. Switching allegiance from his native Cuba in 2011, he represented Dominica in a multitude of international tournaments, including the 2014 Commonwealth Games, 2015 Pan American Games, and 2016 Summer Olympics. Durañona also achieved his outdoor best jump of 17.20 m (-1.0 m/s) at the 2014 Pan American Sports Festival in Mexico City.

Durañona competed for Dominica in the men's triple jump at the 2016 Summer Olympics in Rio de Janeiro. Leading up to his maiden Games, he successfully eclipsed the IAAF Olympic standard (16.85) with a best jump of 16.98 m for a gold-medal triumph at the 2015 NACAC Championships in San José, Costa Rica. Durañona crashed out of the qualifying phase without attaining a mark against his name, failing to produce a single legal jump in all three attempts. Durañona also served as the country's flag bearer at the parade of nations segment of the opening ceremony.

== Competition record ==
Year	Competition	Venue	Position	Event	Notes
Representing Cuba
2009	Central American and Caribbean Championships	Havana, Cuba	–	Triple jump	16.76 m
Representing Dominica
2013	Central American and Caribbean Championships	Morelia, Mexico	1st	Triple jump	16.45 m
2014	Commonwealth Games	Glasgow, United Kingdom	8th	Triple jump	15.81 m
2014	Pan American Sports Festival	Mexico City, Mexico	1st	Triple jump	17.20 m
2014	Central American and Caribbean Games	Xalapa, Mexico	3rd	Triple jump	16.67 m
2015	Pan American Games	Toronto, Canada	4th	Triple jump	16.72 m
2015	NACAC Championships	San José, Costa Rica	1st	Triple jump	16.98 m
2015	World Championships	Beijing, China	21st (q)	Triple jump	16.27 m
2016	World Indoor Championships	Portland, United States	16th	Triple jump	15.27 m
2016	Olympic Games	Rio de Janeiro, Brazil	–	Triple jump	NM
2017	World Championships	London, England	11th	Triple jump	16.42 m
2018	Commonwealth Games	Gold Coast, Australia	2nd	Triple jump	16.86 m
2018	Central American and Caribbean Games	Barranquilla, Colombia	7th	Triple jump	16.18 m
2018	NACAC Championships	Toronto, Canada	4th	Triple jump	16.05 m

Olympic Games
Preceded by Gary di Silvestri	Flag bearer for Dominica; Rio de Janeiro 2016	Succeeded by Thea LaFond; Dennick Luke
