= Chris Lloyd =

Dominica sprinter

Personal information
- Born: Chris Joey Lloyd; October 10, 1980 (age 46)
Medal record
Men's Athletics
Representing Dominica
Pan American Games
Bronze medal – third place	2007 Rio de Janeiro	400 m

Chris Joey Lloyd (born October 10, 1980) is a sprinter from Dominica who specializes in the 400 Metre Dash. His personal best time is 45.40 seconds, achieved in April 2007 in Lawrence. The Dominican record currently belongs to Bruce Phillip with 45.31 seconds. Lloyd does hold the Dominican 200 metres record, however, with 20.62 seconds and 100m, achieved in April 2006 in Baton Rouge.

He participated at the World Championships in 2003 and 2005, the World Indoor Championships in 2004 and 2006 and the 2004 Olympic Games without ever reaching the final. In 2007 he won the bronze medal at the Pan American Games.

Lloyd represented Dominica at the 2008 Summer Olympics in Beijing. He competed at the 200 metres and placed fifth in his first round heat in a time of 20.90 seconds, which was not enough to advance to the second round.
