= Erison Hurtault =

American sprinter (born 1984)

Personal information
- Full name: Erison George Hurtault
- Born: December 29, 1984 (age 41) Edison, New Jersey, United States
- Height: 1.78 m (5 ft 10 in)
- Weight: 75 kg (165 lb)

Sport
- Country: Dominica
- Sport: Athletics
- Event: 400 metres

Achievements and titles
- Personal best: 45.40 (2007)
- Updated on December 15, 2014

Erison George Hurtault (born December 29, 1984) is an American retired sprinter who has represented Dominica in international events, including the 2008 Summer Olympics and the 2012 Summer Olympics. He specialized in the 400 metres.

He grew up in Aberdeen Township, New Jersey, where he attended Matawan Regional High School. He graduated from Columbia University. One of the most decorated athletes in recent Columbia University history, Hurtault was inducted into the Athletics Hall of Fame in 2012. He competed in the Olympic 400 metres event.

Hurtault was honored as the national flag bearer of his parents' native Dominica at the Parade of Nations at the Opening Ceremonies of the London 2012 Summer Olympics. In the Men's 400m first round event, he finished with a seasonal best time of 46.05, but did not qualify to continue competing.

Hurtault spent three seasons as a volunteer assistant track and field coach with Columbia before joining New York University Track and Field, where he spent two years as an assistant coach and several more as head coach.

After retiring from athletics, Hurtault attended New York University Stern School of Business as of May, 2021 was a management consultant at McKinsey & Company.

== Personal bests ==
His personal best time is 45.40 seconds, achieved in June 2007 in Sacramento.

=== Outdoor ===
- 100 m: 10.85 s (wind: -2.4 m/s) – Rieti, Italy, 6 September 2009
- 200 m: 20.86 s (wind: +0.8 m/s) – New York City, United States, 9 July 2011
- 400 m: 45.40 s – Sacramento, United States, 9 June 2007
- 800 m: 1:48.60 s – Princeton, United States, 22 April 2011

=== Indoor ===
- 400 m: 46.34 s – New York City, United States, 25 February 2007

== Achievements ==
Year	Competition	Venue	Position	Event	Notes
Representing Dominica
2008	Central American and Caribbean Championships	Cali, Colombia	12th (sf)	200m	21.22 w A (wind: +2.1 m/s)
2008	Central American and Caribbean Championships	Cali, Colombia	8th	4 × 400 m relay	3:11.06
2008	Olympic Games	Beijing, China	4th (h)	400m	46.10
2009	World Championships	Berlin, Germany	15th (sf)	400m	45.59
2010	Central American and Caribbean Games	Mayagüez, Puerto Rico	5th	400m	45.69
2010	Commonwealth Games	Delhi, India	8th	400m	46.07
2011	Central American and Caribbean Championships	Mayagüez, Puerto Rico	3rd	400m	45.93
2011	World Championships	Daegu, South Korea	23rd (sf)	400m	46.41
2011	Pan American Games	Guadalajara, Mexico	11th (h)	400m	46.24
2012	World Indoor Championships	Istanbul, Turkey	16th (sf)	400m	48.68
2012	Olympic Games	London, United Kingdom	5th (h)	400m	46.05
2014	World Indoor Championships	Sopot, Poland	19th (h)	400m	47.25
2014	Commonwealth Games	Glasgow, United Kingdom	5th (h)	400m	47.02
2014	Pan American Sports Festival	Mexico City, Mexico	9th (h)	400m	46.51 A
2014	Central American and Caribbean Games	Xalapa, Mexico	4th (h)	400m	47.24 A

Olympic Games
Preceded by Jérôme Romain	Flag bearer for Dominica; London 2012	Succeeded by Gary di Silvestri
