= Thea LaFond =

Dominica triple jumper (born 1994)

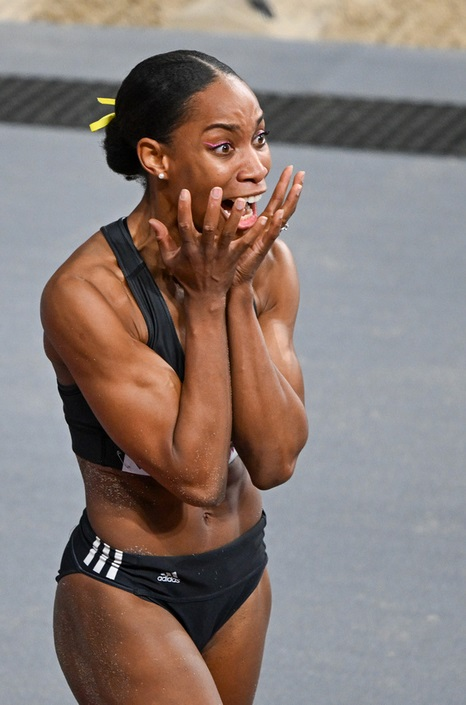
- LaFond after winning gold at the 2024 World Indoor Championships.

Personal information
- Born: 5 April 1994 (age 32) Roseau, Dominica
- Height: 1.73 m (5 ft 8 in)
- Weight: 63 kg (139 lb)

Sport
- Sport: Athletics
- Event: Triple jump

Achievements and titles
- Personal bests: Long jump: 6.64 m NR (2022); Triple jump: 15.25 m NR (2026)
Medal record
Women's athletics
Representing Dominica
Olympic Games
Gold medal – first place	2024 Paris	Triple jump
World Championships
Silver medal – second place	2025 Tokyo	Triple jump
World Indoor Championships
Gold medal – first place	2024 Glasgow	Triple jump
Commonwealth Games
Gold medal – first place	2026 Glasgow	Triple jump
Silver medal – second place	2022 Birmingham	Triple jump
Bronze medal – third place	2018 Gold Coast	Triple jump
Pan American Games
Bronze medal – third place	2023 Santiago	Triple jump

Thea Noeliva LaFond (born April 5, 1994) is a Dominican-American track and field athlete who competes in the triple jump. At the 2024 Summer Olympics, she won gold in the triple jump to claim the first-ever Olympic medal for Dominica. LaFond was also the 2024 World Indoor triple jump champion.

== Biography ==
LaFond emigrated from Dominica to the United States as a young child. During her childhood, she was a dancer (ballerina). She is a graduate of John F. Kennedy High School in Silver Spring, Maryland, where she later returned to be a special education teacher. At the University of Maryland, LaFond was a multi-event athlete who competed in the heptathlon and indoor pentathlon.

LaFond competed at the 2016 Summer Olympics in the women's triple jump; her result of 12.82 meters in the qualifying round did not qualify her for the final.

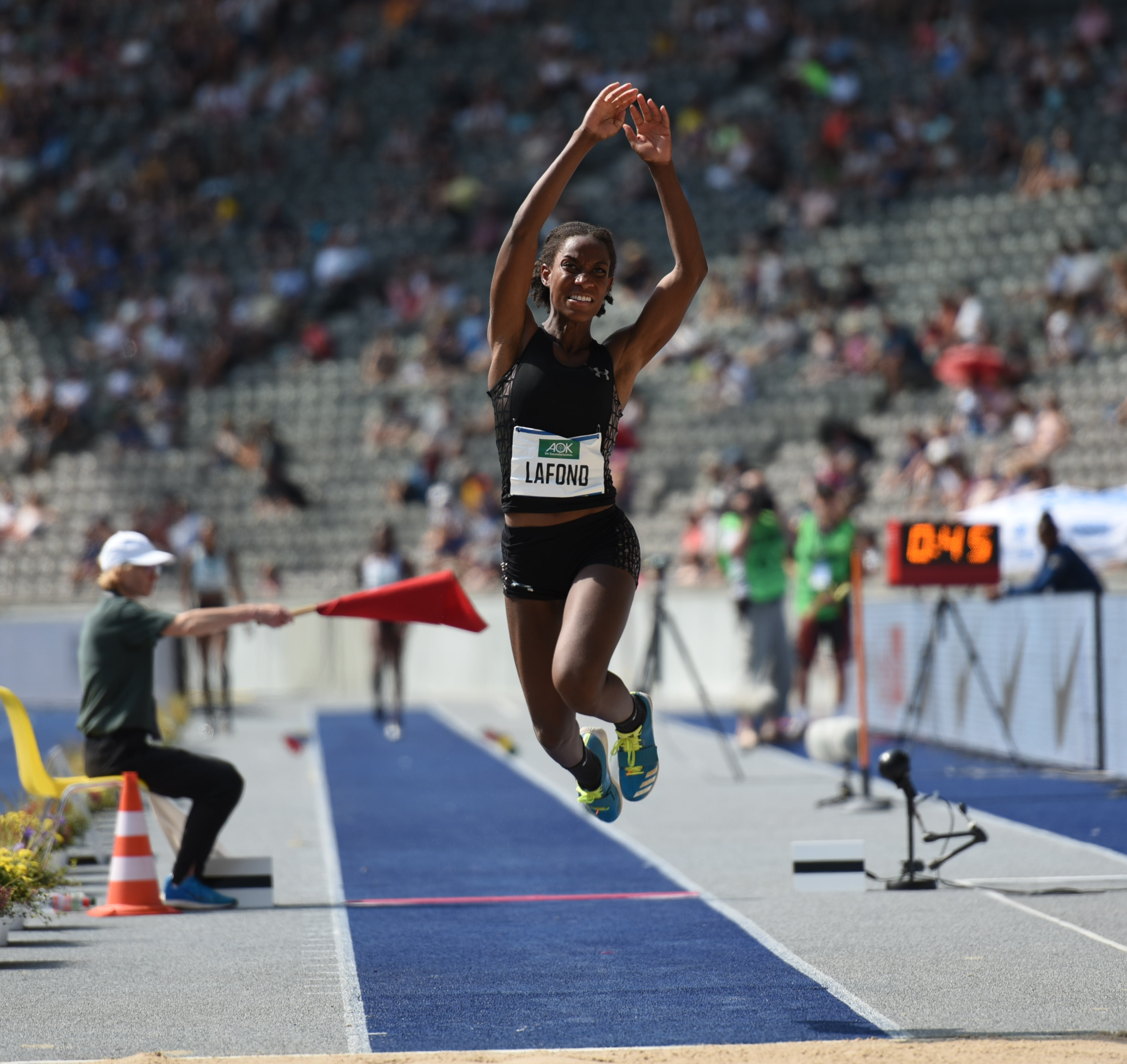
LaFond at the 2019 ISTAF Berlin

Competing at the 2018 Commonwealth Games, she made history, becoming the first Dominican athlete to win a medal at the Commonwealth Games after securing a bronze medal in the women's triple jump. She competed at the 2020 Summer Olympics, where she served as Dominica's flag bearer, alongside fellow track and field athlete Dennick Luke. During the 2022 Commonwealth Games, she improved her result and won a silver medal in the women's triple jump event. In 2026, she won the gold medal in the women's triple jump at the Commonwealth Games in Glasgow, the first-ever Commonwealth Games gold medal for Dominica.

On 3 March 2024, LaFond became the first person from Dominica to win a World Championship gold medal, after taking first place in women's triple jump at the 2024 World Athletics Indoor Championships, setting a national record of 15.01 m.

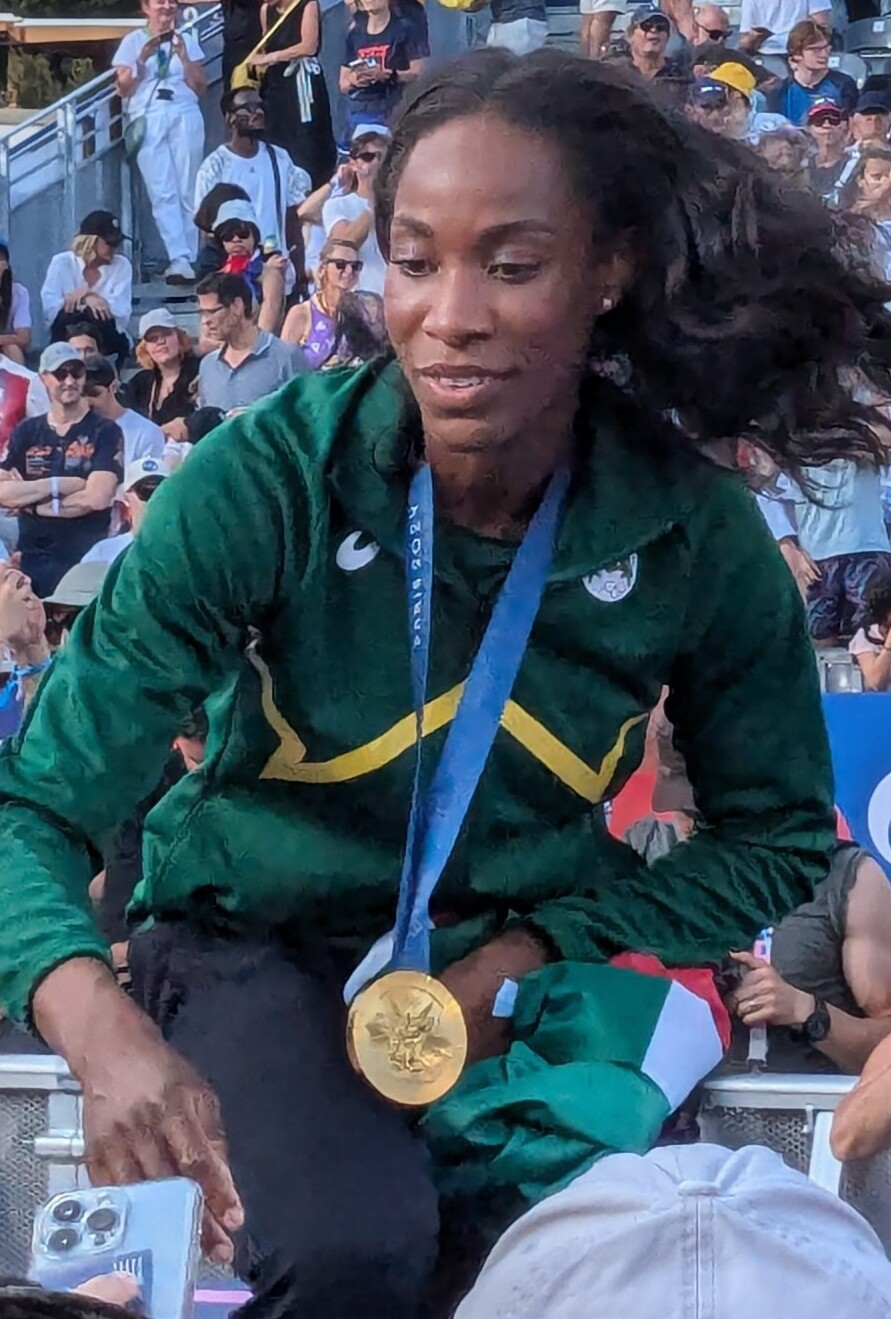
LaFond with her 2024 gold Olympic medal

She won her country's first-ever Olympic medal when she took gold at the Paris Games, setting a new national record record of 15.02 metres in the process. Thereafter, she was rewarded by the government of Dominica with $400,000, appointment as a national sports ambassador, a diplomatic passport, as well as a 7,459-square-foot (693.0 m^{2}) parcel of land in the village of Warner, Saint Paul Parish. A track and field facility would also be built and named in her honour, and she would be granted the Dominica Award of Honour during independence day celebrations in early November.

== Personal life ==
LaFond is married to Aaron Gadson, who is also her coach. They live in Maryland. She is Catholic.

LaFond has a brother, Chreign, who plays defensive end for the Navy Midshipmen.

== International competitions ==
Year	Competition	Venue	Position	Event	Notes
Representing Dominica
2011	World Youth Championships	Lille, France	15th (q)	High jump	1.62 m
2011	World Youth Championships	Lille, France	13th (q)	Triple jump	12.15 m
2012	World Junior Championships	Barcelona, Spain	19th (q)	Triple jump	12.66 m
2014	Commonwealth Games	Glasgow, United Kingdom	11th (q)	High jump	1.81 m
2014	Commonwealth Games	Glasgow, United Kingdom	11th	Triple jump	12.64 m
2015	Pan American Games	Toronto, Canada	13th	High jump	1.80 m
2015	Pan American Games	Toronto, Canada	12th	Triple jump	13.35 m
2015	NACAC Championships	San José, Costa Rica	6th	High jump	1.76 m
2015	NACAC Championships	San José, Costa Rica	6th	Triple jump	13.60 m
2016	Olympic Games	Rio de Janeiro, Brazil	37th (q)	Triple jump	12.82 m
2017	World Championships	London, United Kingdom	19th (q)	Triple jump	13.82 m
2018	World Indoor Championships	Birmingham, United Kingdom	17th	Triple jump	13.68 m
2018	Commonwealth Games	Gold Coast, Australia	3rd	Triple jump	13.92 m
2018	NACAC Championships	Toronto, Canada	3rd	Triple jump	13.74 m
2019	Pan American Games	Lima, Peru	8th	Triple jump	13.70 m
2019	World Championships	Doha, Qatar	N/A	Triple jump	DNS
2021	Olympic Games	Tokyo, Japan	12th	Triple jump	12.57 m
2022	World Indoor Championships	Belgrade, Serbia	4th	Triple jump	14.53 m
2022	World Championships	Eugene, United States	5th	Triple jump	14.56 m
2022	Commonwealth Games	Birmingham, United Kingdom	2nd	Triple jump	14.56 m
2022	NACAC Championships	Freeport, Bahamas	1st	Triple jump	14.49 m
2023	World Championships	Budapest, Hungary	5th	Triple jump	14.90 m
2023	Pan American Games	Santiago, Chile	3rd	Triple jump	14.25 m
2024	World Indoor Championships	Glasgow, United Kingdom	1st	Triple jump	15.01 m
2024	Olympic Games	Paris, France	1st	Triple jump	15.02 m PB NR
2025	World Indoor Championships	Nanjing, China	4th	Triple jump	14.18 m
2025	World Championships	Tokyo, Japan	2nd	Triple jump	14.89 m
2026	World Indoor Championships	Toruń, Poland	5th	Triple jump	14.38 m
2026	Commonwealth Games	Glasgow, United Kingdom	1st	Triple jump	14.60 m
2026	World Ultimate Championship	Budapest, Hungary	4th	Triple jump	14.47 m

Olympic Games
Preceded by Yordanys Durañona	Flag bearer for Dominica; Tokyo 2020; Paris 2024 with Dennick Luke	Succeeded by Incumbent
