= Dominica Olympic Committee =

National Olympic Committee of Dominica

- Country/Region: Dominica
- Code: DMA
- Created: 1987
- Recognized: 1993
- Continental Association: PASO
- President: Billy Doctrove
- Secretary General: Phyllis Baron
- Website: doc.dm

The Dominica Olympic Committee (IOC code: DMA) is the National Olympic Committee representing Dominica. The committee is also the Commonwealth Games Association representing the island nation.

== History ==
It was created in 1987 and recognized by the National Olympic Committee in 1993.

== See also ==
- Dominica at the Olympics
- Dominica at the Commonwealth Games
