= Venezuela at the 2022 World Athletics Championships =

- Flag of Venezuela
- WA code: VEN
- National federation: Venezuelan Athletics Federation

in Eugene, United States 15–24 July 2022
- Competitors: 4 (4 women) in 3 events
- Medals Ranked 22nd: Gold 1 Silver 0 Bronze 0 Total 1

World Athletics Championships appearances
- 1983; 1987; 1991; 1993; 1995; 1997; 1999; 2001; 2003; 2005; 2007; 2009; 2011; 2013; 2015; 2017; 2019; 2022; 2023; 2025

Venezuela competed at the 2022 World Athletics Championships in Eugene, Oregon from 15 to 24 July 2022. Venezuela had entered 4 athletes. Yulimar Rojas won the women's triple jump final to seal a third straight world triple jump crown, after Doha 2019 and London 2017, which made her the first three-time world champion in the discipline at the World Athletics Championships.

== Medalists ==
Medal	Athlete	Event	Date
Gold	Yulimar Rojas	Women's triple jump	18 July

== Results ==
Key

- Q = Qualified for the next round
- q = Not qualified for the next round as a fastest loser or, in field events, by position without achieving the qualifying target
- NR = National record
- PB = Personal best
- SB = Season best
- N/A = Round not applicable for the event

=== Women ===
Track and road events

Athlete	Event	Heat		Semi-final		Final	
Athlete	Event	Result	Rank	Result	Rank	Result	Rank
Joselyn Daniely Brea	5000 metres	15:46.75 SB	29	—		Did not advance	
Edymar Brea	5000 metres	16:41.32	34	—		Did not advance	
Yoveinny Mota	100 metres hurdles	13.12	24	Did not advance			

Field events

Athlete	Event	Qualification		Final	
Athlete	Event	Distance	Position	Distance	Position
Yulimar Rojas	Triple jump	14.72	1 Q	15.47 WL	1st place, gold medalist(s)
