= Venezuela at the 2025 World Athletics Championships =

- Flag of Venezuela
- WA code: VEN

in Tokyo, Japan 13 September 2025 – 21 September 2025
- Competitors: 4 (2 men and 2 women)
- Medals Ranked 41st: Gold 0 Silver 0 Bronze 1 Total 1

World Athletics Championships appearances
- 1983; 1987; 1991; 1993; 1995; 1997; 1999; 2001; 2003; 2005; 2007; 2009; 2011; 2013; 2015; 2017; 2019; 2022; 2023; 2025

Venezuela competed at the 2025 World Athletics Championships in Tokyo, Japan, from 13 to 21 September 2025.

== Medallists ==
Medal	Athlete	Event	Date
Bronze	Yulimar Rojas	Women's triple jump	September 18

== Results ==
Venezuela entered 4 athletes to the championships: 2 women and 2 men.

Key

- Q = Qualified for the next round
- q = Qualified for the next round as a fastest loser or, in field events, by position without achieving the qualifying target
- NR = National record
- PB = Personal best
- SB = Season best
- N/A = Round not applicable for the event

=== Men ===
Field events

Athlete	Event	Qualification		Final	
Athlete	Event	Distance	Position	Distance	Position
Ricardo Montes de Oca	Pole vault	NM		Did not advance	
Leodan Torrealba	Triple jump	16.26	25	Did not advance	

=== Women ===
Track and road events

Athlete	Event	Final	
Athlete	Event	Result	Rank
Magaly Garcia	Marathon	2:58:51	60

Field events

Athlete	Event	Qualification		Final	
Athlete	Event	Distance	Position	Distance	Position
Yulimar Rojas	Triple jump	14.49 SB	2 Q	14.76 SB	3rd place, bronze medalist(s)
