= Venezuela at the 2017 World Championships in Athletics =

- Flag of Venezuela
- WA code: VEN
- National federation: Venezuelan Athletics Federation
- Website: feveatletismo.com (in Spanish)

in London, United Kingdom 4–13 August 2017
- Competitors: 10 (7 men and 3 women) in 10 events
- Medals Ranked =17th: Gold 1 Silver 0 Bronze 1 Total 2

World Championships in Athletics appearances
- 1983; 1987; 1991; 1993; 1995; 1997; 1999; 2001; 2003; 2005; 2007; 2009; 2011; 2013; 2015; 2017; 2019; 2022; 2023; 2025

Venezuela competed at the 2017 World Championships in Athletics in London, United Kingdom, from 4 to 13 August 2017.

== Medalists ==
Medal	Athlete	Event	Date
Gold	Yulimar Rojas	Women's triple jump	August 7
Bronze	Robeilys Peinado	Women's pole vault	August 6

== Results ==
=== Men ===
Track and road events

Athlete	Event	Heat		Semifinal		Final	
Athlete	Event	Result	Rank	Result	Rank	Result	Rank
Luis Orta	Marathon	—N/a				2:33:42 SB	67
José Peña	3000 metres steeplechase	8:35:17	31	—N/a		Did not advance	
Richard Vargas	20 kilometres walk	—N/a				DQ	–

Field events

Athlete	Event	Qualification		Final	
Athlete	Event	Distance	Position	Distance	Position
Eure Yáñez	High jump	2.26	19	Did not advance	

=== Women ===
Track and road events

Athlete	Event	Heat		Semifinal		Final	
Athlete	Event	Result	Rank	Result	Rank	Result	Rank
Andrea Purica	100 metres	11.43	7	Did not advance			
Nediam Vargas	200 metres	24.35	44	Did not advance			
Maria Grazzia Bianchi	Marathon	—N/a				3:04:11	77
Yolimar Pineda	Marathon	—N/a				DNF	–
Milangela Rosales	20 kilometres walk	—N/a				1:38:08	46

Field events

Athlete	Event	Qualification		Final	
Athlete	Event	Distance	Position	Distance	Position
Robeilys Peinado	Pole vault	4.55	2 q	4.65 NR	3rd place, bronze medalist(s)
Yulimar Rojas	Triple jump	14.52	2 Q	14.91	1st place, gold medalist(s)
