= Venezuela at the 2019 World Athletics Championships =

- WA code: VEN

in Doha, Qatar
- Competitors: 8 (3 men and 5 women) in 9 events
- Medals Ranked 17th: Gold 1 Silver 0 Bronze 0 Total 1

World Athletics Championships appearances
- 1983; 1987; 1991; 1993; 1995; 1997; 1999; 2001; 2003; 2005; 2007; 2009; 2011; 2013; 2015; 2017; 2019; 2022; 2023

Venezuela competed at the 2019 World Athletics Championships in Doha, Qatar from 27 September to 6 October 2019. The country finished in 17th place in the medal table.

== Medalists ==
Medal	Athlete	Event	Date
Gold	Yulimar Rojas	Women's triple jump	October 5

== Results ==
(q – qualified, NM – no mark, SB – season best)

=== Men ===
Track and road events

Athlete	Event	Heat		Semifinal		Final	
Athlete	Event	Result	Rank	Result	Rank	Result	Rank
Lucirio Antonio Garrido	800 m	1:46.89	30	did not advance			
Lucirio Antonio Garrido	1500 m	3:52.93	43	did not advance			
Richard Vargas	20 km walk	—				did not finish	

Combined events – Decathlon

Athlete	Event	100 m	LJ	SP	HJ	400 m	110H	DT	PV	JT	1500 m	Final	Rank
Georni Jaramillo	Result	10.88	7.47	15.42	NM	48.66 SB	14.19	44.00	4.50	58.15	DNF	6645	19
Georni Jaramillo	Points	888	927	816	0	877	950	746	760	710	0	6645	19

=== Women ===
Track and road events

Athlete	Event	Heat		Semifinal		Final	
Athlete	Event	Result	Rank	Result	Rank	Result	Rank
Andrea Purica	100 m	11.96	42	did not advance			
Génesis Romero	100 m hurdles	13.14	26 Q	13.18	20	did not advance	

Field events

Athlete	Event	Qualification		Final	
Athlete	Event	Result	Rank	Result	Rank
Robeilys Peinado	Pole vault	4.60	11 Q	4.70 =NR	7
Yulimar Rojas	Triple jump	14.31	4 Q	15.37	1st place, gold medalist(s)
Ahymara Espinoza	Shot put	16.89	27	did not advance	
