= Athletics at the 2019 Pan American Games – Women's triple jump =

Women's triple jump at the 2019 Pan American Games
- Venue: Athletics Stadium
- Dates: August 9
- Competitors: 14 from 11 nations
- Winning distance: 15.11 m GR

Medalists
Gold medal	Yulimar Rojas	Venezuela
Silver medal	Shanieka Ricketts	Jamaica
Bronze medal	Liadagmis Povea	Cuba

The women's triple jump competition of the athletics events at the 2019 Pan American Games took place on August 9 at the 2019 Pan American Games Athletics Stadium. The defending Pan American Games champion was Caterine Ibargüen from Colombia.

== Summary ==
With Caterine Ibargüen not competing after participating in the long jump, Yulimar Rojas took the lead with her first jump that no competitor would beat. Along the way to gold, her fourth attempt was 15.11 m (49 ft 6 3/4 in), making her the number 16 jumper in history. Silver medalist Shanieka Ricketts displayed amazing consistency with three jumps within 1 cm of her best.

== Records ==
Prior to this competition, the existing world and Pan American Games records were as follows:

World record	Inessa Kravets (UKR)	15.50	Gothenburg, Sweden	August 10, 1995
Pan American Games record	Caterine Ibargüen (COL)	14.92	Guadalajara, Mexico	October 28, 2011

== Schedule ==
Date	Time	Round
August 9, 2019	17:50	Final

== Results ==
All times shown are in meters.

KEY:	q	Fastest non-qualifiers	Q	Qualified	NR	National record	PB	Personal best	SB	Seasonal best	DQ	Disqualified

=== Final ===
The results were as follows

Rank	Name	Nationality	#1	#2	#3	#4	#5	#6	Mark	Notes
1st place, gold medalist(s)	Yulimar Rojas	Venezuela	14.90	x	14.67	15.11	x	x	15.11 +0.6	GR, NR
2nd place, silver medalist(s)	Shanieka Ricketts	Jamaica	x	14.76	14.76	14.43	14.70	14.77	14.77 +0.7	PB
3rd place, bronze medalist(s)	Liadagmis Povea	Cuba	14.39	14.60	14.16	14.10	14.38	14.29	14.60 -0.6	
4	Kimberly Williams	Jamaica	x	14.15	13.82	13.87	12.23	13.64	14.15 +1.4	
5	Tamara Myers	Bahamas	13.54	x	x	13.96	x	13.84	13.96 -0.2	SB
6	Liuba Zaldívar	Ecuador	13.64	x	13.63	13.78	13.42	13.37	13.78 +0.3	
7	Ana José Tima	Dominican Republic	13.58	13.41	13.75	x	13.16	13.04	13.75 -0.2	
8	Thea LaFond	Dominica	13.70	11.44	x	13.60	13.42	13.31	13.70 -0.5	
9	Yosiris Urrutia	Colombia	x	x	13.35				13.35 +0.1	
10	Davisleydi Velazco	Cuba	x	x	13.32				13.32 +1.2	
11	Silvana Segura	Peru	13.27	12.83	12.28				13.27 +1.0	
12	Sandisha Antoine	Saint Lucia	13.15	12.75	12.84				13.15 +0.8	
13	Kelly McKee	United States	x	x	12.68				12.68 +0.3	
14	Bria Matthews	United States	12.13	x	x				12.13 +1.9	
