= Venezuela at the 2023 World Athletics Championships =

- Flag of Venezuela
- WA code: VEN

in Budapest, Hungary 19 August 2023 – 27 August 2023
- Competitors: 5 (1 man and 4 women)
- Medals Ranked 18th: Gold 1 Silver 0 Bronze 0 Total 1

World Athletics Championships appearances
- 1983; 1987; 1991; 1993; 1995; 1997; 1999; 2001; 2003; 2005; 2007; 2009; 2011; 2013; 2015; 2017; 2019; 2022; 2023

Venezuela competed at the 2023 World Athletics Championships in Budapest, Hungary, from 19 to 27 August 2023.

== Medalists ==
Medal	Athlete	Event	Date
Gold	Yulimar Rojas	Women's triple jump	August 25

== Results ==
Venezuela entered 5 athletes.

Key

- Q = Qualified for the next round
- q = Qualified for the next round as a fastest loser or, in field events, by position without achieving the qualifying target
- NR = National record
- PB = Personal best
- SB = Season best
- N/A = Round not applicable for the event

=== Men ===
Field events

Athlete	Event	Qualification		Final	
Athlete	Event	Distance	Position	Distance	Position
Leodan Torrealba	Triple jump	16.72	11 q	16.58	10

=== Women ===
Track and road events

Athlete	Event	Heat		Final	
Athlete	Event	Result	Rank	Result	Rank
Joselyn Brea	5000 metres	15:11.16	10	Did not advance	

Field events

Athlete	Event	Qualification		Final	
Athlete	Event	Distance	Position	Distance	Position
Robeilys Peinado	Pole vault	4.65 SB	1 Q	4.65 =SB	8
Yulimar Rojas	Triple jump	14.59	3 Q	15.08	1st place, gold medalist(s)
Rosa Rodríguez	Hammer throw	70.81	14	Did not advance	
