= 2021 World Triathlon Duathlon Championships =

International sports competition

The 2021 World Triathlon Duathlon Championships was a duathlon competition held in Avilés, Spain from 6 to 7 November 2021 and organized by World Triathlon. The Elite and U23 races consisted of a 10.65 km (6.62 mi) run, 39.6 km (24.6 mi) bike and 5.2 km (3.2 mi) run. The championship also included other races per age group, junior, sprint per age group and para-duathlon.

== Results ==
In the women's Elite race, Venezuelan Joselyn Brea, competing under World Triathlon flag, won her first world championship. French Nathan Guerbeur won his second consecutive title in the men's Elite edition.

=== Men ===
| Rank | Name | Run | Bike | Run | Time |
|---|---|---|---|---|---|
Elite
| Gold medal | Nathan Guerbeur (FRA) | 31:48 | 56:42 | 16:15 | 1:45:28 |
| Silver medal | Maxime Hueber-Moosbrugger (FRA) | 31:48 | 57:00 | 16:08 | 1:45:34 |
| Bronze medal | Arnaud Dely (BEL) | 31:49 | 56:69 | 16:21 | 1:45:53 |

=== Women ===
| Rank | Name | Run | Bike | Run | Time |
|---|---|---|---|---|---|
Elite
| Gold medal | Joselyn Daniely Brea | 36:50 | 1:05:06 | 17:41 | 2:00:19 |
| Silver medal | Ai Ueda (JPN) | 36:52 | 1:04:58 | 17:49 | 2:00:30 |
| Bronze medal | Marion Legrand (FRA) | 36:52 | 1:05:06 | 18:03 | 2:00:41 |
