= Tori Franklin =

American triple jumper (born 1992)

Tori Franklin OLY
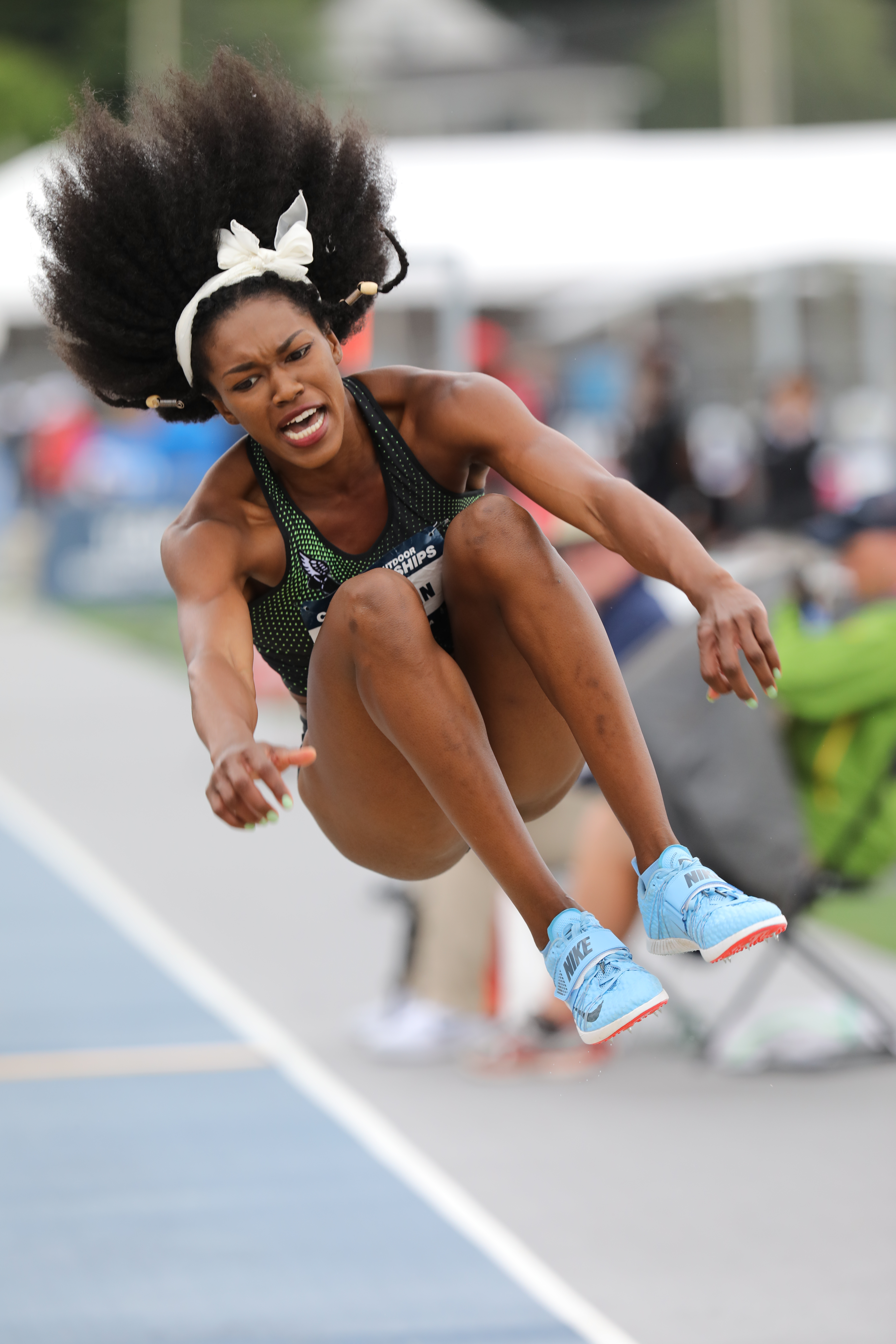
- Franklin at the 2018 USA Outdoor Track and Field Championships

Personal information
- Born: October 7, 1992 (age 34) Evanston, Illinois, United States
- Height: 5 ft 8 in (173 cm)
- Weight: 122 lb (55 kg)

Sport
- Country: United States
- Sport: Athletics
- Event: Triple jump
- College team: Michigan State Spartans
- Club: Oiselle; 2017–2018; Nike; 2018–present
- Turned pro: 2015
Medal record
Women's athletics
Representing the United States
World Championships
Bronze medal – third place	2022 Eugene	Triple jump
NACAC Under-23 Championships
Gold medal – first place	2014 Kamloops	Triple Jump

Tori Franklin (born October 7, 1992) is an American triple jumper. Tori Franklin is the first American woman to ever medal in the triple jump at a World Athletics Championships (which happened in 2022). Tori Franklin also notably competed in the women's triple jump at the 2019 and 2017 World Championships in Athletics, jumping a personal best 14.03 m (46 ft 1/4 in) in the preliminary round to place 9th & 13th respectively.

== Author ==
Tori Franklin's first book You Anthem: Stories and Reflections of Celebration was published in Fall 2023.

== Competition ==
Tori Franklin competed at the 2014 North America Central American and Caribbean Under-23 Championships in Kamloops, British Columbia. There Franklin competed for the United States in the triple jump and posted a mark of 13.42 meters to finish first overall in the event.

Franklin competed in the women's triple jump at the 2017 World Championships in Athletics, jumping a then personal best 14.03 m (46 ft 1/4 in) in the preliminary round to rank #13 as the best non-qualifying athlete.

Franklin qualified for the final with her 14.03 m (46 ft 1/4 in) first round jump at the 2018 World Indoor Championships, to eventually place 8th.

Franklin broke the U.S. record in the triple jump with her 14.84 m (48 ft 8 1/4 in) performance at the International Meeting Region de Guadeloupe in Baie-Mahault, Guadeloupe, France (overseas region) on May 12, 2018 – surpassing Olympic 4th-place finisher Keturah Orji‘s 14.71 m (48 ft 3 in).

In 2021, Franklin moved to Athens, Greece.

Franklin won a bronze medal at the 2022 World Athletics Championships in Eugene, Oregon; on her fifth jump she moved from 4th to 3rd place with her best jump of the season. Her medal was the United States' first ever World Championship Triple Jump medal.

Year	Competition	Venue	Position	Event	Notes
2023	World Athletics Championships	Budapest, Hungary	12th	Triple jump	DNS in Final
2022	World Athletics Championships	Eugene, United States	3rd	Triple jump	14.72 m (48 ft 4 in)
2021	Summer Olympics	Tokyo, Japan	25th	Triple jump	13.68 m (44 ft 11 in)
2019	World Championships	Doha, Qatar	9th	Triple jump	14.08 m (46 ft 2 in)
2018	World Indoor Championships	Birmingham, United Kingdom	8th	Triple jump	14.03 m (46 ft 0 in)
2017	World Championships	London, United Kingdom	14th	Triple jump	14.03 m (46 ft 0 in)
2014	NACAC U23	Kamloops Hillside Stadium	1st	Triple Jump	13.42 m (44 ft 0 in)

=== US Track and field Championships ===
Year	Competition	Venue	Position	Event	Notes
2023	USA Outdoor Track and Field Championships	Eugene, Oregon	1st	Triple jump	14.44 m (47 ft 5 in)
2022	USA Outdoor Track and Field Championships	Eugene, Oregon	2nd	Triple jump	14.59 m (47 ft 10 in)
2022	USA Indoor Track and Field Championships	Spokane, Washington	2nd	Triple jump	13.78 m (45 ft 3 in)
2021	United States Olympic Trials	Eugene, Oregon	2nd	Triple jump	14.36 m (47 ft 1 in)
2020	USA Indoor Track and Field Championships	Albuquerque, New Mexico	1st	Triple jump	14.64 m (48 ft 0 in) NR
2019	USA Outdoor Track and Field Championships	Des Moines, Iowa	2nd	Triple jump	14.36 m (47 ft 1 in)
2019	USA Indoor Track and Field Championships	Staten Island, New York	2nd	Triple jump	14.45 m (47 ft 5 in)
2018	USA Outdoor Track and Field Championships	Des Moines, Iowa	2nd	Triple jump	14.52 m (47 ft 8 in)
2018	USA Indoor Track and Field Championships	Albuquerque, New Mexico	1st	Triple jump	14.15 m (46 ft 5 in)
2017	USA Outdoor Track and Field Championships	Sacramento, California	2nd	Triple jump	13.80 m (45 ft 3 in)
2017	USA Indoor Track and Field Championships	Albuquerque, New Mexico	1st	Triple jump	13.86 m (45 ft 6 in)
2016	USA Olympic Trials	Eugene, Oregon	9th	Triple jump	13.13 m (43 ft 1 in)
2016	USA Indoor Track and Field Championships	Portland, Oregon	2nd	Triple jump	13.66 m (44 ft 10 in)
2015	USA Outdoor Track and Field Championships	Eugene, Oregon	11th	Triple jump	13.01 m (42 ft 8 in)
2014	USA Outdoor Track and Field Championships	Sacramento, California; Hornet Stadium (Sacramento)	10th	Triple jump	12.93 m (42 ft 5 in)
2013	USA Outdoor Track and Field Championships	Des Moines, Iowa; Drake Stadium (Drake University)	5th	Triple jump	13.45 m (44 ft 2 in)
2012	US Olympic Trials – Track and Field Championships	Eugene, Oregon; Hayward Field	17th	Triple jump	12.53 m (41 ft 1 in)

== Michigan State University ==
Tori Franklin broke the Michigan State University Spartans school record in the triple jump for the first time 13.39 m (43 ft 11 in) en route to a first-place finish at the University of Notre Dame Meyo Invitational to earn February 2014 Big Ten Conference athlete of the week for Women's Indoor Track and Field.

Tori Franklin set Michigan State University Spartans school records in the triple jump 13.56 m (44 ft 6 in) indoor and 13.41 m (44 ft 0 in) outdoor.

Year	Big Ten indoor	NCAA indoor	Big Ten Outdoor	NCAA Outdoor
2015	Triple Jump 13.31 m (43 ft 8 in) 1st	Triple Jump 12.65 m (41 ft 6 in) 12th	Triple Jump 12.72 m (41 ft 9 in) 5th	Triple Jump 13.38 m (43 ft 11 in) 5th
2014	Triple Jump 13.56 m (44 ft 6 in) 1st	Triple Jump 13.17 m (43 ft 3 in) 5th	Triple Jump 13.16 m (43 ft 2 in) 1st	Triple Jump 12.76 m (41 ft 10 in) 13th
2013	Triple Jump 12.61 m (41 ft 4 in) 6th		Triple Jump 13.16 m (43 ft 2 in) 1st	Triple Jump 13.56 m (44 ft 6 in) 4th
2012	Triple Jump 12.84 m (42 ft 2 in) 2nd	Triple Jump 13.34 m (43 ft 9 in) 3rd	Triple Jump 12.91 m (42 ft 4 in) 3rd	Triple Jump 13.00 m (42 ft 8 in) 12th

== Prep ==
As a senior at Downers Grove South High School in 2011, Tori anchored a 4×400 meters at Illinois High School Association AAA state track and field final to a silver medal. As a Junior in 2010, Tori took gold as IHSA AAA state champion in triple jump with a Downers Grove South High School record in 40 feet 0.5 inches (12.205 m) and anchored a 4×400 meters at Illinois High School Association AAA state track and field final to a bronze medal. As a sophomore in 2009, Tori took silver as IHSA AAA state champion in triple jump in 38 feet 6.5 inches (11.748 m).
