= Simón Bolívar Sports Complex =

Sports facility in Anzoátegui, Venezuela

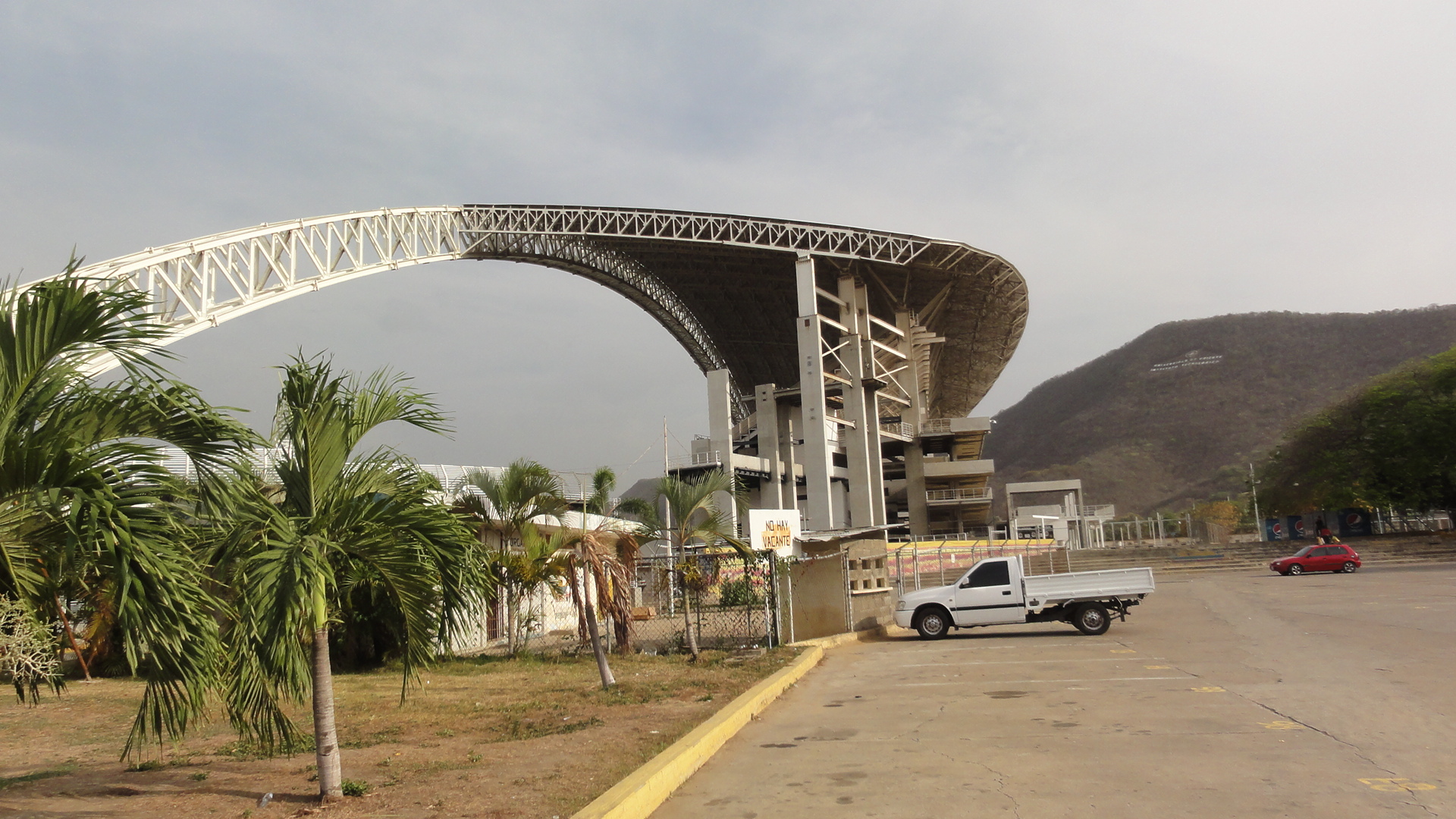

The Simón Bolívar Sports Complex is a sports facility in Anzoátegui state, between the cities of Puerto la Cruz and Barcelona in Venezuela. It was opened in 2007.

The complex was commissioned to be built as part of the renovations of the José Antonio Anzoátegui Olympic Stadium to prepare it to host matches of the 2007 Copa América. However, it was not completed at the time of the Copa América: the main stadium's roof was not fitted, and the Salvador de la Plaza athletics center was further behind schedule, not finished for another year.

The Salvador de la Plaza athletics center at the sports complex was the training ground of Yulimar Rojas. It only has six running lanes, rather than the standard eight, and has never received maintenance, degrading the facilities over time. One coach describes it as Jumanji. It is also a frequent site of theft, despite a police headquarters nearby: reportedly everything except the tracks have been taken at different times, from electrical units to the bathrooms. However, more than 50 athletes still train at the ground as of December 2020, when Rojas returned to film an appeal asking for officials to clean up the center.

There is a mural depicting triple jumper Rojas and footballer Alexander Rondón at the complex.
