= Venezuela at the 2013 World Championships in Athletics =

- WA code: VEN

in Moscow
- Competitors: 15
- Medals: Gold 0 Silver 0 Bronze 0 Total 0

World Championships in Athletics appearances
- 1983; 1987; 1991; 1993; 1995; 1997; 1999; 2001; 2003; 2005; 2007; 2009; 2011; 2013; 2015; 2017; 2019; 2022; 2023

Venezuela competed at the 2013 World Championships in Athletics in Moscow, Russia, from 10–18 August 2013. A team of 15 athletes was announced to represent the country in the event.

== Results ==
(q – qualified, NM – no mark, SB – season best)

=== Men ===
Track and road events

| Athlete | Event | Preliminaries | | Heats | | Semifinals | | Final | |
| Athlete | Event | Time | Rank | Time | Rank | Time | Rank | Time | Rank |
|---|---|---|---|---|---|---|---|---|---|
| José Pena | 3000 metres steeplechase | | | | | | | | |
| Alvaro Luis Cassiani; Jermaine Chirinos; Arturo Ramirez; Diego Rivas | 4 × 100 metres relay | | | | | | | | |
| Alberto Aguilar; Alberth Bravo; José Melendez; Freddy Mezones; Arturo Ramirez | 4 × 400 metres relay | | | | | | | | |
| Pedro Mora | Marathon | | | | | | | | |
| Yerenman Salazar | 50 kilometres walk | | | | | | | | |

=== Women ===
Track and road events

| Athlete | Event | Preliminaries | | Heats | | Semifinals | | Final | |
| Athlete | Event | Time | Rank | Time | Rank | Time | Rank | Time | Rank |
|---|---|---|---|---|---|---|---|---|---|
| Zuleima Amaya | Marathon | | | | | | | 2:58:22 | 43 |
| Yolymar Pineda | Marathon | | | | | | | DNF | - |

Field events

| Athlete | Event | Preliminaries | | Final | |
| Athlete | Event | Width Height | Rank | Width Height | Rank |
|---|---|---|---|---|---|
| Ahymará Espinoza | Shot put | 16.86 | 24 | did not advance | |
| Rosa Rodriguez | Hammer throw | 69.35 | 15 | did not advance | |
