= Liadagmis Povea =

Cuban triple jumper (born 1996)

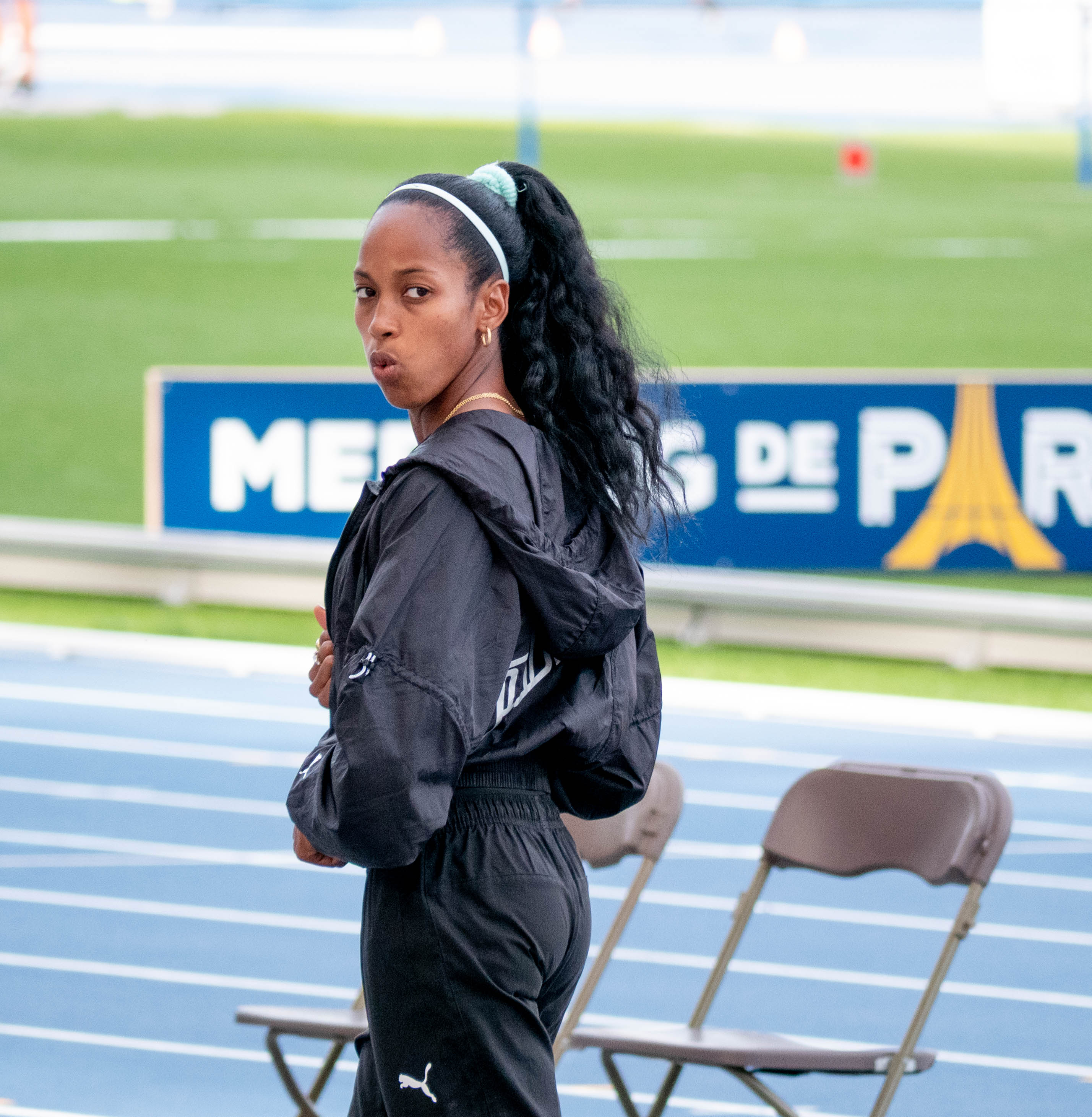
- Povea at 2019 Meeting de Paris

Personal information
- Born: 6 February 1996 (age 30) San Juan y Martínez, Cuba
- Height: 1.60 m (5 ft 3 in)
- Weight: 52 kg (115 lb)

Sport
- Country: Cuba
- Sport: Track and field
- Event: Triple jump
Medal record
Women's athletics
Representing Cuba
World Indoor Championships
Silver medal – second place	2025 Nanjing	Triple jump
Pan American Games
Silver medal – second place	2023 Santiago	Triple jump
Bronze medal – third place	2019 Lima	Triple jump

Liadagmis Povea Rodríguez (born 6 February 1996) is a Cuban athlete who specialises in the triple jump. In 2014, she won silver medal at the World Junior Championships. Povea qualified for the 2016 Rio Olympics. She competed at the 2020 Tokyo Olympics.

== Personal bests ==
Event	Record	Wind	Venue	Date
Triple jump	14.93	+0.8	Havana	22 May 2021
Triple jump indoor	14.81	—N/a	Liévin	15 February 2023

== International competitions ==
Representing Cuba
Year	Competition	Venue	Position	Event	Notes
2014	World Junior Championships	Eugene, OR, United States	2nd	Triple jump	14.07 m
2015	Pan American Games	Toronto, Canada	6th	Triple jump	13.97 m (w)
2015	Pan American Junior Championships	Edmonton, Canada	2nd	Triple jump	14.08 m
2016	Olympic Games	Rio de Janeiro, Brazil	25th (q)	Triple jump	13.63 m
2017	World Championships	London, United Kingdom	22nd (q)	Triple jump	13.55 m
2018	Central American and Caribbean Games	Barranquilla, Colombia	3rd	Triple jump	14.44 m (w)
2019	Pan American Games	Lima, Peru	3rd	Triple jump	14.60 m
2019	World Championships	Doha, Qatar	15th (q)	Triple jump	14.08 m
2021	Olympic Games	Tokyo, Japan	5th	Triple jump	14.70 m
2022	World Indoor Championships	Belgrade, Serbia	5th	Triple jump	14.45 m
2022	Ibero-American Championships	La Nucia, Spain	2nd	Triple jump	14.41 m
2022	World Championships	Eugene, OR, United States	17th (q)	Triple jump	14.01 m
2023	Central American and Caribbean Games	San Salvador, El Salvador	3rd	Triple jump	14.85 m
2023	World Championships	Budapest, Hungary	6th	Triple jump	14.87 m
2023	Pan American Games	Santiago, Chile	2nd	Triple jump	14.41 m
2024	Olympic Games	Paris, France	4th	Triple jump	14.64 m
2025	World Indoor Championships	Nanjing, China	2nd	Triple jump	14.57 m
2025	World Championships	Tokyo, Japan	4th	Triple jump	14.72 m
2026	World Indoor Championships	Toruń, Poland	4th	Triple jump	14.41 m
2026	Central American and Caribbean Games	Santo Domingo, Dominican Republic	2nd	Triple jump	14.71 m
2026	World Ultimate Championship	Budapest, Hungary	–	Triple jump	NM
