= 2023 World Athletics Championships – Women's triple jump =

Women's triple jump at the 2023 World Championships
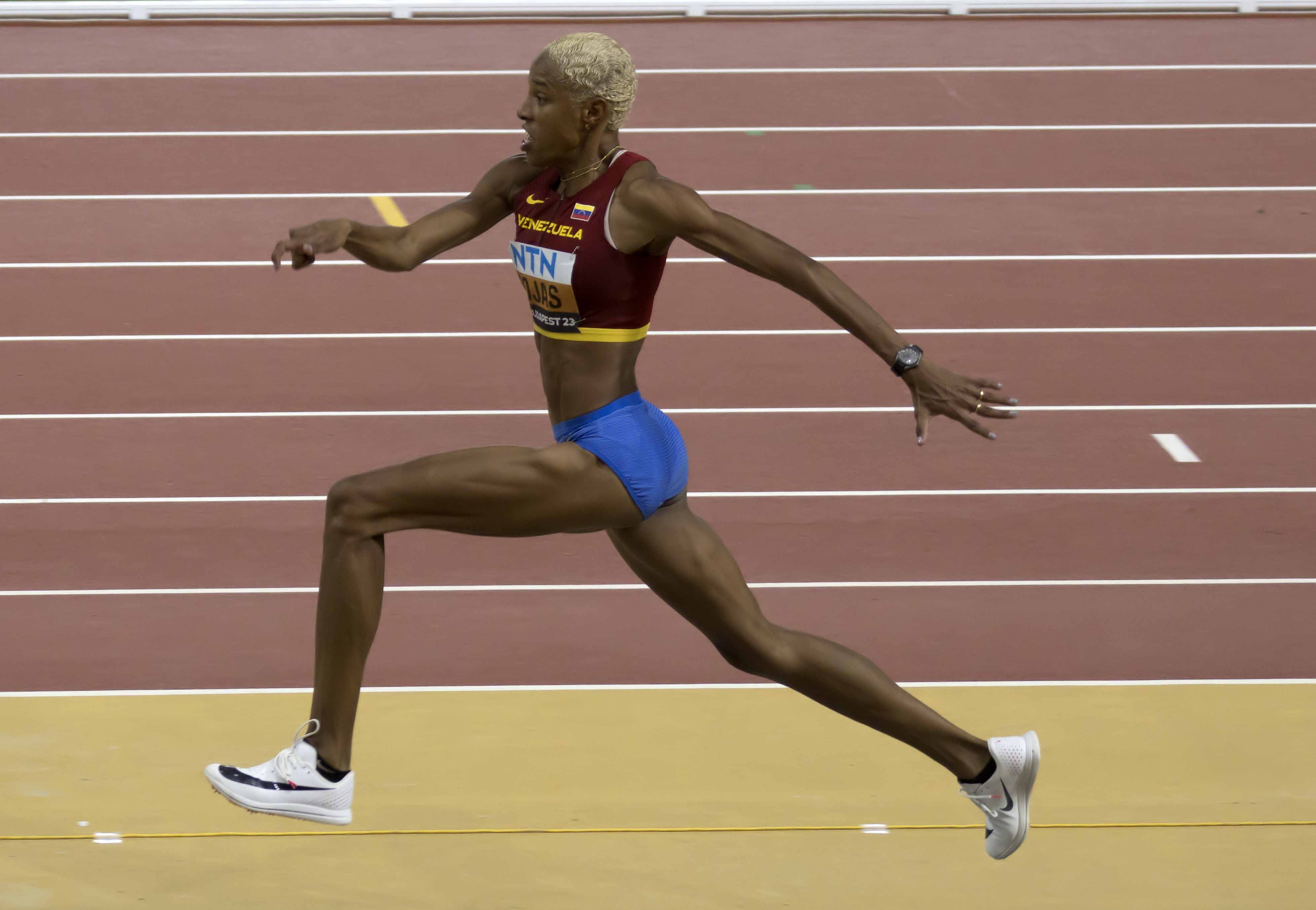
- Yulimar Rojas jumping in the final.
- Venue: National Athletics Centre
- Dates: 23 August (qualification); 25 August (final)
- Competitors: 36 from 25 nations
- Winning distance: 15.08

Medalists
gold medal	Yulimar Rojas	Venezuela
silver medal	Maryna Bekh-Romanchuk	Ukraine
bronze medal	Leyanis Pérez Hernández	Cuba

The women's triple jump at the 2023 World Athletics Championships was held at the National Athletics Centre in Budapest on 23 and 25 August 2023.

== Summary ==
On paper this would be a shoo-in for the three time defending champion/world record holder/world leader Yulimar Rojas. It didn't exactly work out that way.

Tori Franklin was unable to start the finals after qualifying the day before. In the first round, returning silver medalist Shanieka Ricketts got things started with a 14.84m. Maryna Bekh-Romanchuk then put up 15.00m almost answered immediately by Leyanis Pérez with a 14.96m. Six jumps into the competition, there was already what would prove to be medal winning jumps. Rojas later fouled. Rickets improved on her second attempt to 14.87m. Rojas' second attempt was only 14.33m, which put her in a tie with Keturah Orji for the seventh and thus last qualifying position. In the third round, Kimberly Williams jumped 14.38m to take the seventh spot. And Rojas was unable to improve on her third attempt, only making 14.26m. With only 8 getting their final 3 jumps, to break the tie, they look at the second best jump for each athlete. Rojas was fortunate that Orji had fouled her other two attempts. Rojas made the final eight by the skin of her teeth. She didn't make use of the first two extra jumps, though none of the other leaders improved either. In the unfamiliar position of starting the final round. Taking a safe mark, Rojas took off with her toes barely touching the leading edge of the board, giving up most of the 20cm width, but she clearly did not foul. She bounded out to 15.08 m (49 ft 5 1/2 in), in turn jumping from eighth to first. All the other competitors still had one more attempt to improve. Rickets used that opportunity to improve to 14.93m, but that wasn't enough to get her a medal. Rojas had to sweat it out as neither Pérez or Bekh-Romanchuk were able to improve and Rojas was able to squeak into a fourth consecutive World Championship.

== Records ==
Before the competition records were as follows:

Record	Athlete & Nat.	Perf.	Location	Date
World record	Yulimar Rojas (VEN)	15.74 m (i)	Belgrade, Serbia	20 March 2022
Championship record	Inessa Kravets (UKR)	15.50 m	Gothenburg, Sweden	10 August 1995
World Leading	Yulimar Rojas (VEN)	15.18 m	Chorzów, Poland	16 July 2023
African Record	Françoise Mbango Etone (CMR)	15.39 m	Beijing, China	17 August 2008
Asian Record	Olga Rypakova (KAZ)	15.25 m	Split, Croatia	26 October 2009
North, Central American and Caribbean record	Yamilé Aldama (CUB)	15.29 m	Rome, Italy	11 July 2003
South American Record	Yulimar Rojas (VEN)	15.74 m (i)	Belgrade, Serbia	20 March 2022
European Record	Inessa Kravets (UKR)	15.50 m	Gothenburg, Sweden	10 August 1995
Oceanian record	Nicole Mladenis (AUS)	14.04 m	Hobart, Australia	9 March 2002
Oceanian record	Nicole Mladenis (AUS)	14.04 m	Perth, Australia	7 December 2003

== Qualification standard ==
The standard to qualify automatically for entry was 14.52 m.

== Schedule ==
The event schedule, in local time (UTC+2), was as follows:

Date	Time	Round
23 August	19:10	Qualification
25 August	19:38	Final

== Results ==
=== Qualification ===
Athletes attaining a mark of at least 14.30 metres ( Q ) or at least the 12 best performers ( q ) qualify for the final.

Rank	Group	Name	Nationality	Round			Mark	Notes
Rank	Group	Name	Nationality	1	2	3	Mark	Notes
1	A	Shanieka Ricketts	Jamaica	14.67			14.67	Q, SB
2	B	Thea LaFond	Dominica	x	14.62		14.62	Q, NR
3	B	Yulimar Rojas	Venezuela	14.59			14.59	Q
4	A	Maryna Bekh-Romanchuk	Ukraine	14.55			14.55	Q
5	A	Leyanis Pérez Hernandez	Cuba	14.50			14.50	Q
6	A	Keturah Orji	United States	x	14.33		14.33	Q
7	B	Liadagmis Povea	Cuba	14.05	14.31		14.31	Q
8	B	Kimberly Williams	Jamaica	14.30			14.30	Q, SB
9	A	Ottavia Cestonaro	Italy	13.74	14.20	13.97	14.20	q, SB
10	A	Dariya Derkach	Italy	x	14.15	13.95	14.15	q
11	A	Jasmine Moore	United States	14.01	13.90	14.13	14.13	q
12	B	Tori Franklin	United States	x	14.13	14.00	14.13	q
13	A	Maria Vicente	Spain	13.72	13.57	14.13	14.13	
14	A	Tuğba Danişmaz	Turkey	13.86	x	14.11	14.11	
15	A	Elena Andreea Taloş	Romania	x	x	14.06	14.06	SB
16	B	Maja Åskag	Sweden	13.78	13.98	13.85	13.98	
17	B	Ackelia Smith	Jamaica	13.95	13.79	13.63	13.95	
18	A	Kristiina Mäkelä	Finland	13.64	x	13.88	13.88	
19	A	Rüta Kate Lasmane	Latvia	x	13.77	13.87	13.87	
20	A	Dovile Kilty	Lithuania	13.76	13.87	x	13.87	
21	B	Adrianna Laskowska	Poland	13.69	13.66	13.51	13.69	
22	B	Diana Ana Maria Ion	Romania	x	13.58	13.66	13.66	
23	B	Gabriele dos Santos	Brazil	13.34	x	13.66	13.66	
24	A	Sharifa Davronova	Uzbekistan	13.66	13.17	13.22	13.66	
25	A	Neja Filipič	Slovenia	13.24	13.58	13.64	13.64	
26	A	Mariko Morimoto	Japan	x	x	13.64	13.64	
26	A	Kira Wittmann	Germany	x	13.64	x	13.64	
28	B	Eva Pepelnak	Slovenia	13.29	13.47	13.60	13.60	
29	B	Charisma Taylor	Bahamas	13.37	12.17	13.51	13.51	
30	B	Senni Salminen	Finland	12.67	13.26	13.50	13.50	
31	A	Véronique Kossenda Rey	Cameroon	13.21	13.39	13.20	13.39	
32	B	Mariya Siney	Ukraine	x	13.38	13.09	13.38	
33	B	Aina Grikšaitė	Lithuania	x	13.31	13.36	13.36	
34	B	Maoko Takashima	Japan	13.34	x	13.25	13.34	
35	A	Sangoné Kandji	Senegal	12.58	12.57	12.82	12.82	
36	B	Beatrix Szabó	Hungary	12.68	12.79	12.61	12.79	

=== Final ===
Results:

Rank	Name	Nationality	Round						Mark	Notes
Rank	Name	Nationality	1	2	3	4	5	6	Mark	Notes
1st place, gold medalist(s)	Yulimar Rojas	Venezuela	x	14.33	14.26	x	x	15.08	15.08	
2nd place, silver medalist(s)	Maryna Bekh-Romanchuk	Ukraine	15.00	14.81	14.66	x	14.87	x	15.00	SB
3rd place, bronze medalist(s)	Leyanis Pérez Hernandez	Cuba	14.96	x	14.70	14.82	14.90	14.83	14.96	
4	Shanieka Ricketts	Jamaica	14.84	14.87	14.79	14.73	11.69	14.93	14.93	SB
5	Thea LaFond	Dominica	14.71	14.49	14.57	x	14.90	14.42	14.90	NR
6	Liadagmis Povea	Cuba	14.23	14.52	14.55	14.87	14.71	14.86	14.87	SB
7	Kimberly Williams	Jamaica	14.04	14.08	14.38	13.60	14.25	13.89	14.38	SB
8	Dariya Derkach	Italy	14.36	x	x	x	x	x	14.36	SB
9	Keturah Orji	United States	14.33	x	x				14.33	
10	Ottavia Cestonaro	Italy	14.05	x	13.69				14.05	
11	Jasmine Moore	United States	x	x	13.54				13.54	
12	Tori Franklin	United States	DNS							
