= Venezuela at the 2011 World Championships in Athletics =

- WA code: VEN
- National federation: Federación Venezolana de Atletismo
- Website: www.fva.cavillo.com.ve

in Daegu
- Competitors: 3
- Medals: Gold 0 Silver 0 Bronze 0 Total 0

World Championships in Athletics appearances
- 1983; 1987; 1991; 1993; 1995; 1997; 1999; 2001; 2003; 2005; 2007; 2009; 2011; 2013; 2015; 2017; 2019; 2022; 2023; 2025

Venezuela competed at the 2011 World Championships in Athletics from August 27 to September 4 in Daegu, South Korea. A team of 3 athletes was announced to represent the country in the event.

== Results ==
=== Men ===
Athlete	Event	Preliminaries		Heats		Semifinals		Final	
Athlete	Event	Time Width Height	Rank	Time Width Height	Rank	Time Width Height	Rank	Time Width Height	Rank
Eduard Villanueva	1500 metres			3:41.89	26	3:36.96 NR	5	3:37.31	8

=== Women ===
Athlete	Event	Preliminaries		Heats		Semifinals		Final	
Athlete	Event	Time Width Height	Rank	Time Width Height	Rank	Time Width Height	Rank	Time Width Height	Rank
Milángela Rosales	20 kilometres walk							1:40:49	36
Marielys Rojas	High jump	1.85 SB	25					Did not advance	
