= 2022 World Athletics Championships – Women's triple jump =

Women's triple jump at the 2022 World Championships
- Venue: Hayward Field
- Dates: 16 July (qualification); 18 July (final)
- Competitors: 29 from 21 nations
- Winning distance: 15.47

Medalists
gold medal	Yulimar Rojas	Venezuela
silver medal	Shanieka Ricketts	Jamaica
bronze medal	Tori Franklin	United States

The women's triple jump at the 2022 World Athletics Championships was held at the Hayward Field in Eugene on 16 and 18 July 2022. 28 athletes from 20 nations entered to the event.

== Summary ==
Coming in to the Championships Yulimar Rojas held the women's triple jump world record and was the defending champion for the event.

After jumping 14.60m in the first round, Rojas found herself in an unfamiliar second place behind a 14.89m new world leader from returning two time silver medalist Shanieka Ricketts. As the second jumper, in the second round Rojas settled it. 15.47 m (50 ft 9 in) has only been bettered by one other person in history (that was the Championship Record by Inessa Kravets in 1995). With first place virtually settled, the remaining athletes had to look at the other medals. Tori Franklin's first round 14.53m was third place until Leyanis Pérez jumped 14.70m to move up. The marks from Ricketts and Pérez held up until Franklin jumped 14.72m in the fifth round to finally claim bronze. To finish things off, Rojas jumped 15.39m on the final jump of the competition, only the #9 jump in history.

== Records ==
Before the competition records were as follows:

Record	Athlete & Nat.	Perf.	Location	Date
World record	Yulimar Rojas (VEN)	15.74 m (i)	Belgrade, Serbia	20 March 2022
Championship record	Inessa Kravets (UKR)	15.50 m	Gothenburg, Sweden	10 August 1995
World Leading	Yulimar Rojas (VEN)	14.83 m	La Nucia, Spain	11 June 2022
African Record	Françoise Mbango Etone (CMR)	15.39 m	Beijing, China	17 August 2008
Asian Record	Olga Rypakova (KAZ)	15.25 m	Split, Croatia	26 October 2009
North, Central American and Caribbean record	Yamilé Aldama (CUB)	15.29 m	Rome, Italy	11 July 2003
South American Record	Yulimar Rojas (VEN)	15.74 m (i)	Belgrade, Serbia	20 March 2022
European Record	Inessa Kravets (UKR)	15.50 m	Gothenburg, Sweden	10 August 1995
Oceanian record	Nicole Mladenis (AUS)	14.04 m	Hobart, Australia	9 March 2002
Oceanian record	Nicole Mladenis (AUS)	14.04 m	Perth, Australia	7 December 2003

== Qualification standard ==
The standard to qualify automatically for entry was 14.32 m.

== Schedule ==
The event schedule, in local time (UTC−7), was as follows:

Date	Time	Round
16 July	10:30	Qualification
18 July	18:20	Final

== Results ==
=== Qualification ===
The qualification round took place on 16 July, in two groups, both starting at 10:29. Athletes attaining a mark of at least 14.40 metres ( Q ) or at least the 12 best performers ( q ) qualified for the final.

Rank	Group	Name	Nationality	Round			Mark	Notes
Rank	Group	Name	Nationality	1	2	3	Mark	Notes
1	B	Yulimar Rojas	Venezuela	14.72			14.72	Q
2	A	Maryna Bekh-Romanchuk	Ukraine	14.54			14.54	Q
3	B	Ana José Tima	Dominican Republic	14.18	14.31	14.52	14.52	Q NR
4	A	Kristiina Mäkelä	Finland	14.48			14.48	Q PB
5	A	Shanieka Ricketts	Jamaica	14.45			14.45	Q
6	A	Thea LaFond	Dominica	14.39			14.39	q
7	A	Keturah Orji	United States	14.23	13.62	14.37	14.37	q
8	A	Ackelia Smith	Jamaica	13.63	13.75	14.36	14.36	q PB
9	B	Tori Franklin	United States	x	14.36		14.36	q
10	A	Patrícia Mamona	Portugal	14.04	x	14.32	14.32	q
11	A	Leyanis Pérez	Cuba	14.23	14.30	14.17	14.30	q
12	B	Kimberly Williams	Jamaica	14.27	13.69	14.27	14.27	q
13	A	Jasmine Moore	United States	13.86	14.09	14.24	14.24	
14	B	Senni Salminen	Finland	14.05	14.21	14.13	14.21	
15	A	Hanna Minenko	Israel	x	14.11	x	14.11	
16	A	Neja Filipič	Slovenia	13.82	x	14.05	14.05	
17	B	Liadagmis Povea	Cuba	14.01	13.96	13.99	14.01	
18	B	Naomi Metzger	Great Britain & N.I.	13.97	13.78	13.84	13.97	
19	B	Davisleydi Velazco	Cuba	x	13.66	13.94	13.94	
20	B	Neele Eckhardt-Noack	Germany	13.63	13.58	13.93	13.93	
21	A	Ruth Usoro	Nigeria	13.93	13.85	13.87	13.93	
22	A	Ottavia Cestonaro	Italy	13.63	x	13.60	13.63	
23	B	Tuğba Danışmaz	Turkey	13.34	13.63	11.42	13.63	
24	B	Spyridoula Karydi	Greece	13.55	13.62	13.28	13.62	
25	B	Gabriele Santos	Brazil	13.62	x	x	13.62	
26	B	Yekaterina Sariyeva	Azerbaijan	x	13.24	13.46	13.46	
27	A	Jessie Maduka	Germany	13.17	13.30	13.14	13.30	
28	B	Mariya Yefremova	Kazakhstan	x	13.27	x	13.27	

=== Final ===
The final was started on 18 July at 18:20.

Rank	Name	Nationality	Round						Mark	Notes
Rank	Name	Nationality	1	2	3	4	5	6	Mark	Notes
1st place, gold medalist(s)	Yulimar Rojas	Venezuela	14.60	15.47	15.24	x	x	15.39	15.47	WL
2nd place, silver medalist(s)	Shanieka Ricketts	Jamaica	14.89	14.86	14.37	14.40	14.62	14.80	14.89	SB
3rd place, bronze medalist(s)	Tori Franklin	United States	14.53	14.45	x	x	14.72	x	14.72	SB
4	Leyanis Pérez	Cuba	14.40	14.70	14.39	14.54	14.58	14.19	14.70	PB
5	Thea LaFond	Dominica	x	13.18	14.43	14.26	x	14.56	14.56	
6	Keturah Orji	United States	13.47	14.49	x	x	x	14.06	14.49	
7	Kimberly Williams	Jamaica	x	14.29	13.74	14.29	13.99	14.19	14.29	
8	Patrícia Mamona	Portugal	14.25	x	14.19	x	14.29	14.00	14.29	
9	Kristiina Mäkelä	Finland	14.18	14.15	14.10				14.18	
10	Ana José Tima	Dominican Republic	14.13	14.12	13.87				14.13	
11	Maryna Bekh-Romanchuk	Ukraine	x	12.70	13.91				13.91	
12	Ackelia Smith	Jamaica	13.01	x	13.90				13.90	
