= Shanieka Ricketts =

Jamaican athlete (born 1992)

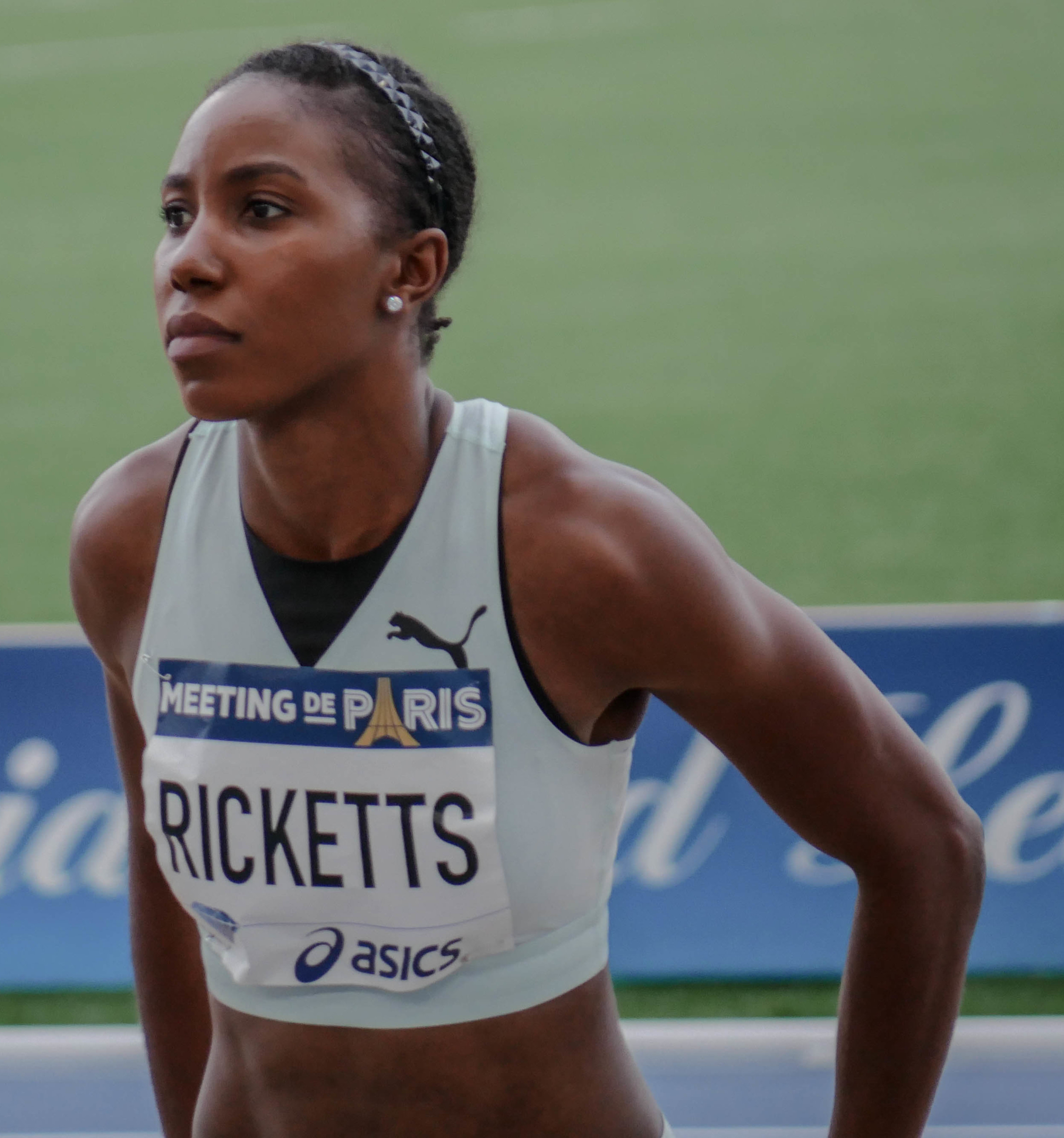
- Ricketts in 2019

Personal information
- Nationality: Jamaican
- Born: 2 February 1992 (age 34) Saint Thomas Parish, Jamaica
- Height: 1.88 m (6 ft 2 in)
- Weight: 64 kg (141 lb)

Sport
- Country: Jamaica
- Sport: Track and field
- Event: Triple jump
- College team: San Diego State Aztecs
- Coached by: Kerry-Lee Ricketts

Achievements and titles
- Personal best: Triple Jump: 15.03m (2023)
Medal record
Women's athletics
Representing Jamaica
Olympic Games
Silver medal – second place	2024 Paris	Triple jump
World Championships
Silver medal – second place	2019 Doha	Triple jump
Silver medal – second place	2022 Eugene	Triple jump
Commonwealth Games
Gold medal – first place	2022 Birmingham	Triple jump
Silver medal – second place	2018 Gold Coast	Triple jump
Pan American Games
Silver medal – second place	2019 Lima	Triple jump
NACAC Championships
Gold medal – first place	2015 San José	Triple jump
Gold medal – first place	2018 Toronto	Triple jump
Gold medal – first place	2025 Freeport	Triple jump
Diamond League
First place	2019 Zurich	Triple Jump
Second place	2024 Brussels	Triple Jump
Second place	2023 Eugene	Triple Jump
Second place	2021 Zurich	Triple Jump
Third place	2022 Zurich	Triple Jump
CARIFTA Games U20
Gold medal – first place	2009 Vieux Fort	High jump
Gold medal – first place	2008 Basseterre	Triple jump

Shanieka Ricketts, née Shanieka Thomas, (born 2 February 1992) is a Jamaican athlete whose specialty is the triple jump. She won the silver medal at the 2019 World Championships in Doha and at the 2024 Summer Olympics in Paris.

== Biography ==
Competing for the San Diego State Aztecs track and field team, Ricketts won the 2013 and 2014 triple jump at the NCAA Division I Outdoor Track and Field Championships. Her personal bests in the event are 15.03 metres outdoors (Eugene, Diamond League, 2023) and 14.08 metres indoors (Albuquerque 2013).

== Personal Life ==
Shanieka is married to her coach, and they have one child together.

== Competition record ==
Year	Competition	Venue	Position	Event	Notes
Representing Jamaica
2008	CARIFTA Games (U17)	Basseterre, Saint Kitts and Nevis	1st	Triple jump	11.83 m
2009	CARIFTA Games (U20)	Vieux Fort, Saint Lucia	1st	High jump	1.70 m
2009	CARIFTA Games (U20)	Vieux Fort, Saint Lucia	4th	Triple jump	12.01 m
2014	Commonwealth Games	Glasgow, United Kingdom	4th	Triple jump	13.85 m
2015	Pan American Games	Toronto, Canada	9th (q)	Triple jump	13.74 m (w)
2015	NACAC Championships	San José, Costa Rica	1st	Triple jump	14.23 m
2015	World Championships	Beijing, China	11th	Triple jump	14.08 m
2016	World Indoor Championships	Portland, United States	8th	Triple jump	13.95 m
2016	Olympic Games	Rio de Janeiro, Brazil	14th (q)	Triple jump	14.02 m
2017	World Championships	London, United Kingdom	8th	Triple jump	14.13 m
2018	World Indoor Championships	Birmingham, United Kingdom	10th	Triple jump	13.93 m
2018	Commonwealth Games	Gold Coast, Australia	2nd	Triple jump	14.52 m
2018	NACAC Championships	Toronto, Canada	1st	Triple jump	14.25 m
2019	Pan American Games	Lima, Peru	2nd	Triple jump	14.77 m
2019	World Championships	Doha, Qatar	2nd	Triple jump	14.92 m
2021	Olympic Games	Tokyo, Japan	4th	Triple jump	14.84 m
2022	World Championships	Eugene, United States	2nd	Triple jump	14.89 m
2023	World Championships	Budapest, Hungary	4th	Triple jump	14.93 m
2024	Olympic Games	Paris, France	2nd	Triple jump	14.87 m
2025	NACAC Championships	Freeport, Bahamas	1st	Triple jump	14.23 m
2025	World Championships	Tokyo, Japan	5th	Triple jump	14.56 m

Olympic Games
Preceded by Benjamin Alexander; Jazmine Fenlator-Victorian	Flag bearer for Jamaica; Paris 2024 with Josh Kirlew	Succeeded by Incumbent
