= Tamara Myers =

Bahamian triple jumper

Tamara Myers (Miah)
Personal information
- Born: 27 July 1993 (age 32) North Andros, Bahamas
- Education: University of Arkansas

Sport
- Sport: Athletics
- Event: Triple jump
- College team: Arkansas Razorbacks

Tamara Myers (Miah) (born 27 July 1993) is a Bahamian athlete specialising in the triple jump. She represented her country at the 2017 World Championships without advancing to the final.

== International competitions ==
Year	Competition	Venue	Position	Event	Notes
Representing the Bahamas
2008	CARIFTA Games (U17)	Basseterre, Saint Kitts and Nevis	2nd	Triple jump	11.55 m
2009	CARIFTA Games (U17)	Vieux Fort, Saint Lucia	2nd	Triple jump	11.70 m (w)
2011	CARIFTA Games (U20)	Montego Bay, Jamaica	–	4 × 100 m relay	DQ
2011	CARIFTA Games (U20)	Montego Bay, Jamaica	2nd	Triple jump	12.35 m
2011	Central American and Caribbean Championships	Mayagüez, Puerto Rico	6th	Triple jump	12.45 m
2011	Pan American Junior Championships	Miramar, United States	2nd	Triple jump	12.85 m
2012	CARIFTA Games (U20)	Hamilton, Bermuda	4th	Long jump	5.63 m
2012	CARIFTA Games (U20)	Hamilton, Bermuda	2nd	Triple jump	11.62 m
2012	Central American and Caribbean; Junior Championships (U20)	San Salvador, El Salvador	1st	Long jump	6.02 m
2012	Central American and Caribbean; Junior Championships (U20)	San Salvador, El Salvador	3rd	Triple jump	12.42 m
2013	Central American and Caribbean Championships	Morelia, Mexico	7th	Long jump	5.79 m
2013	Central American and Caribbean Championships	Morelia, Mexico	1st	Triple jump	13.18 m
2014	Commonwealth Games	Glasgow, United Kingdom	17th (q)	Long jump	6.14 m
2014	Commonwealth Games	Glasgow, United Kingdom	13th (q)	Triple jump	12.87 m
2015	Pan American Games	Toronto, Canada	10th (q)	Triple jump	13.57 m
2015	NACAC Championships	San José, Costa Rica	4th	Triple jump	13.78 m (w)
2017	World Championships	London, United Kingdom	24th (q)	Triple jump	13.41 m
2018	Commonwealth Games	Gold Coast, Australia	9th	Triple jump	13.15 m
2019	Pan American Games	Lima, Peru	5th	Triple jump	13.96 m
2022	NACAC Championships	Freeport, Bahamas	4th	Triple jump	13.69 m
2023	Central American and Caribbean Games	San Salvador, El Salvador	6th	Triple jump	13.31 m

== Personal bests ==
Following are the personal bests

Outdoor

- Long jump – 6.51 (Kingston 2017)
- Triple jump – 14.03 (+1.0 m/s, Philadelphia 2017) NR

Indoor

- Long jump – 6.33 (Fayetteville 2015)
- Triple jump – 13.40 (Fayetteville 2015)
