= Venezuela at the 2009 World Championships in Athletics =

- WA code: VEN

in Berlin
- Competitors: 2
- Medals: Gold 0 Silver 0 Bronze 0 Total 0

World Championships in Athletics appearances
- 1983; 1987; 1991; 1993; 1995; 1997; 1999; 2001; 2003; 2005; 2007; 2009; 2011; 2013; 2015; 2017; 2019; 2022; 2023; 2025

Venezuela competed at the 2009 World Championships in Athletics in Berlin, Germany, which were held from 15 to 23 August 2009. The athlete delegation consisted of two competitors, middle-distance runner Eduard Villanueva and hammer thrower Rosa Rodríguez. Villanueva competed in the men's 800 metres and failed to make it past the qualifying heats; he placed sixth in his heat. Rodríguez competed in the women's hammer throw and failed to qualify for the finals; she placed 30th in her qualification group.

== Background ==
The 2009 World Championships in Athletics were held at the Olympiastadion in Berlin, Germany. Under the auspices of the International Amateur Athletic Federation, this was the twelfth edition of the World Championships. It was held from 15 to 23 August 2009 and had 47 different events. Among the competing teams was Venezuela. For this edition of the World Championships in Athletics, middle-distance runner Eduard Villanueva and hammer thrower Rosa Rodríguez competed for the nation.

== Results ==
=== Men ===
Villanueva competed in the qualifying heats of the men's 800 metres on 20 August 2009 in the first heat against six other competitors. There, he recorded a time of 1:48.61 and placed sixth, failing to advance further to the semifnials as only the top three of each heat and the next three fastest athletes would only be able to do so.

Event	Athletes	Heats		Semifinal		Final	
Event	Athletes	Result	Rank	Result	Rank	Result	Rank
800 m	Eduard Villanueva	1:48.61	6	did not advance			

=== Women ===
Rodríguez competed in the qualifiers of the women's hammer throw on 20 August 2009 in Group B. Her first attempt recorded a distance of 65.88 metres, which was her longest for the event. She placed 30th in her group and failed to qualify as she did not meet the minimum qualifying performance of 72 metres or placed within the twelve best performers.

Event	Athletes	Qualification		Final	
Event	Athletes	Result	Rank	Result	Rank
Hammer throw	Rosa Rodríguez	65.88	30	did not advance	
