= Venezuela at the 2015 World Championships in Athletics =

- WA code: VEN

in Beijing
- Competitors: 11
- Medals: Gold 0 Silver 0 Bronze 0 Total 0

World Championships in Athletics appearances
- 1983; 1987; 1991; 1993; 1995; 1997; 1999; 2001; 2003; 2005; 2007; 2009; 2011; 2013; 2015; 2017; 2019; 2022; 2023; 2025

Venezuela competed at the 2015 World Championships in Athletics in Beijing, China, from 22–30 August 2015.

== Results ==
(q – qualified, NM – no mark, SB – season best)

=== Men ===
Track and road events

Athlete	Event	Heat		Semifinal		Final	
Athlete	Event	Result	Rank	Result	Rank	Result	Rank
Alberth Bravo	400 metres	45.28	28	did not advance			
Alberth Bravo; José Meléndez; Arturo Ramírez; Freddy Mezones	4 × 400 metres relay	3:02.96 SB	14	—N/a		did not advance	
Richard Vargas	20 kilometres walk	—N/a				1:28:18	47

=== Women ===
Track and road events

Athlete	Event	Heat		Semifinal		Final	
Athlete	Event	Result	Rank	Result	Rank	Result	Rank
Andrea Purica	100 metres	11.62	42	did not advance			
Nediam Vargas	100 metres	11.51	39	did not advance			
Nercely Soto	200 metres	23.16	25	did not advance			

Field events

Athlete	Event	Qualification		Final	
Athlete	Event	Distance	Position	Distance	Position
Robeilys Peinado	Pole vault	4.30	23	did not advance	
Ahymara Espinoza	Shot put	16.76	21	did not advance	
Rosa Rodríguez	Hammer throw	70.57	10 q	67.78	11
