= 2017 World Championships in Athletics – Women's triple jump =

Women's Triple Jump event at the 2017 World Championships in London

Women's triple jump at the 2017 World Championships
- Venue: Olympic Stadium
- Dates: 5 August (qualification); 7 August (final)
- Competitors: 26 from 21 nations
- Winning mark: 14.91

Medalists
gold medal	Yulimar Rojas	Venezuela
silver medal	Caterine Ibargüen	Colombia
bronze medal	Olga Rypakova	Kazakhstan

Video on YouTube Official Video

The women's triple jump at the 2017 World Championships in Athletics was held at the Olympic Stadium on 5 and 7 August.

The winning margin was 2 cm which as of 2024 remains the only time the women's triple jump has been won by less than 4 cm at these championships.

== Summary ==
The final started off with Shanieka Ricketts jumping 14.13 metres, which turned out to be her best. The second jumper Kristin Gierisch improved 3 centimeters to 14.16 metres then the fifth jumper, Olympic bronze medalist Olga Rypakova took the lead out to 14.45 metres. That lasted four more jumps until the young Venezuelan Olympic silver medalist Yulimar Rojas added 10 more centimeters to 14.55 metres which only lasted until the next athlete down the runway, gold medalist Colombian veteran Caterine Ibargüen added another dozen to 14.67 metres. The second round saw Rojas improve up to 14.82 metres, while Ibargüen only improved to 10.69 metres. The third round saw Rypakova jump past Ibargüen to 14.77 metres. Rojas improved a centimetre, then Ibargüen leaped past both of them back into the lead with a 14.89 metres. In the fifth round, Rojas edged ahead again with a 14.91 metres, but Ibargüen had two more attempts left. Her 14.88 metres final attempt didn't quite get there.

It was the same medalists as the Olympics, but a South American changing of the guard at the top. Rojas' was the first gold medal in the World Championships for Venezuela, only a day after Robeilys Peinado got their first medal ever.

== Records ==
Before the competition records were as follows:

Record	Perf.	Athlete	Nat.	Date	Location
World	15.50	Inessa Kravets	UKR	10 Aug 1995	Gothenburg, Sweden
Championship	15.50	Inessa Kravets	UKR	10 Aug 1995	Gothenburg, Sweden
World leading	14.96	Yulimar Rojas	VEN	2 Jun 2017	Andújar, Spain
African	15.39	Françoise Mbango Etone	CMR	17 Aug 2008	Beijing, China
Asian	15.25	Olga Rypakova	KAZ	4 Sep 2010	Split, Croatia
NACAC	15.28	Yargelis Savigne	CUB	31 Aug 2007	Osaka, Japan
South American	15.31	Caterine Ibargüen	COL	18 Jul 2014	Fontvieille, Monaco
European	15.50	Inessa Kravets	UKR	10 Aug 1995	Göteborg, Sweden
Oceanian	14.04	Nicole Mladenis	AUS	9 Mar 2002	Hobart, Australia
Oceanian	14.04	Nicole Mladenis	AUS	7 Dec 2003	Perth, Australia

No records were set at the competition.

== Qualification standard ==
The standard to qualify automatically for entry was 14.10 metres.

== Schedule ==
The event schedule, in local time (UTC+1), was as follows:

Date	Time	Round
5 August	11:00	Qualification
7 August	20:25	Final

== Results ==
=== Qualification ===
The qualification round took place on 5 August, in two groups, with Group A starting at 11:01 and Group B starting at 11:00. Athletes attaining a mark of at least 14.20 metres ( Q ) or at least the 12 best performers ( q ) qualified for the final. The overall results were as follows:

Rank	Group	Name	Nationality	Round			Mark	Notes
Rank	Group	Name	Nationality	1	2	3	Mark	Notes
1	B	Olga Rypakova	Kazakhstan	14.57			14.57	Q
2	A	Yulimar Rojas	Venezuela	14.17	14.52		14.52	Q
3	A	Susana Costa	Portugal	13.83	13.88	14.35	14.35	Q, PB
4	B	Patrícia Mamona	Portugal	13.97	14.29		14.29	Q
5	B	Kristin Gierisch	Germany	14.11	x	14.25	14.25	Q
6	B	Shanieka Ricketts	Jamaica	13.93	14.21		14.21	Q
7	B	Caterine Ibargüen	Colombia	14.21			14.21	Q
8	B	Hanna Knyazyeva-Minenko	Israel	x	14.17	13.72	14.17	q, SB
9	A	Kimberly Williams	Jamaica	14.09	x	14.14	14.14	q
10	A	Anna Jagaciak	Poland	14.09	13.72	14.04	14.09	q
11	B	Ana Peleteiro	Spain	13.84	14.07	13.09	14.07	q
12	A	Neele Eckhardt	Germany	11.95	13.97	14.07	14.07	q
13	B	Tori Franklin	United States	x	14.03	12.96	14.03	PB
14	B	Elena Panțuroiu	Romania	13.91	14.01	14.02	14.02	
15	B	Dovilė Dzindzaletaitė	Lithuania	13.97	x	13.43	13.97	
16	A	Kristiina Mäkelä	Finland	13.92	13.69	13.77	13.92	
17	A	Gabriela Petrova	Bulgaria	13.66	13.90	13.66	13.90	
18	A	Jeanine Assani Issouf	France	x	13.87	13.67	13.87	
19	B	Thea LaFond	Dominica	13.38	13.82	13.50	13.82	
20	A	Paraskevi Papahristou	Greece	13.40	x	13.75	13.75	
21	A	Tânia da Silva	Brazil	13.74	13.70	13.14	13.74	
22	A	Liadagmis Povea	Cuba	13.44	x	13.55	13.55	
23	B	Nadia Eke	Ghana	x	13.25	13.54	13.54	
24	B	Tamara Myers	Bahamas	x	x	13.41	13.41	
25	A	Fátima Diame	Spain	12.97	13.28	13.36	13.36	
26	A	Mariya Ovchinnikova	Kazakhstan	13.18	12.90	x	13.18	

=== Final ===
The final took place on 7 August at 20:25. The results were as follows:

Rank	Name	Nationality	Round						Mark	Notes
Rank	Name	Nationality	1	2	3	4	5	6	Mark	Notes
1st place, gold medalist(s)	Yulimar Rojas	Venezuela	14.55	14.82	14.83	13.69	14.91	14.50	14.91	
2nd place, silver medalist(s)	Caterine Ibargüen	Colombia	14.67	14.69	14.89	14.80	14.71	14.88	14.89	SB
3rd place, bronze medalist(s)	Olga Rypakova	Kazakhstan	14.45	x	14.77	14.32	14.52	14.36	14.77	SB
4	Hanna Knyazyeva-Minenko	Israel	14.11	14.04	14.29	x	14.42	13.97	14.42	SB
5	Kristin Gierisch	Germany	14.16	14.23	14.30	x	13.84	14.33	14.33	
6	Anna Jagaciak	Poland	14.13	14.25	14.13	14.05	14.02	13.88	14.25	
7	Ana Peleteiro	Spain	13.92	x	14.23	x	–	–	14.23	PB
8	Shanieka Ricketts	Jamaica	14.13	14.04	14.10	13.82	13.81	14.01	14.13	
9	Patrícia Mamona	Portugal	x	14.04	14.12				14.12	
10	Kimberly Williams	Jamaica	14.01	x	13.95				14.01	
11	Susana Costa	Portugal	x	13.99	13.97				13.99	
12	Neele Eckhardt	Germany	13.94	13.97	11.81				13.97	
