= Yoveinny Mota =

Venezuelan hurdler

Personal information
- Full name: Yoveinny Deteri Mota Aranguren
- Born: 20 June 2000 (age 26)
- Education: University of Arkansas
- Height: 1.70 m (5 ft 7 in)
- Weight: 55 kg (121 lb)

Sport
- Sport: Athletics
- Events: 100 m hurdles, 60 m hurdles

Yoveinny Deteri Mota Aranguren (born 20 June 2000) is a Venezuelan athlete competing in the sprint hurdles. She represented her country at the 2022 World Indoor Championships finishing fifth.

Her personal bests are 12.95 seconds in the 100 metres hurdles (+0.9 m/s, Baton Rouge 2021) and 7.99 seconds in the 60 metres hurdles (Belgrade 2022). Both are current national records.

== International competitions ==
Year	Competition	Venue	Position	Event	Notes
Representing Venezuela
2016	South American U18 Championships	Concordia, Argentina	8th (h)	200 m	25.62
2016	South American U18 Championships	Concordia, Argentina	2nd	100 m hurdles (76.2 cm)	13.68 (w)
2017	World U18 Championships	Nairobi, Kenya	4th	100 m hurdles (76.2 cm)	13.28
2017	Bolivarian Games	Santa Marta, Colombia	6th	100 m hurdles	14.38
2018	World U20 Championships	Tampere, Finland	11th (sf)	100 m hurdles	13.54
2018	South American U23 Championships	Cuenca, Ecuador	5th	100 m hurdles	17.68
2019	South American Championships	Lima, Peru	4th	100 m hurdles	13.65
2019	South American U20 Championships	Cali, Colombia	1st	100 m hurdles	13.52
2019	Pan American U20 Championships	San José, Costa Rica	8th (h)	100 m hurdles	13.72^{1}
2019	Pan American Games	Lima, Peru	13th (h)	100 m hurdles	13.60
2022	World Indoor Championships	Belgrade, Serbia	5th	60 m hurdles	8.05
2022	Bolivarian Games	Valledupar, Colombia	1st	100 m hurdles	13.07
2022	World Championships	Eugene, United States	24th (h)	100 m hurdles	13.12
2022	South American Games	Asunción, Paraguay	1st	100 m hurdles	13.60
2023	Pan American Games	Santiago, Chile	5th	100 m hurdles	13.39
2024	Olympic Games	Paris, France	14th (rep)	100 m hurdles	DQ

^{1}Disqualified in the final
