= List of Venezuelan records in athletics =

The following are the national records in athletics in Venezuela maintained by its national athletics federation: Federación Venezolana de Atletismo (FVA).

== Outdoor ==
Key to tables: Awaiting ratification Record not kept by FVA Not ratified or later rescinded by FVA

=== Men ===
Event	Record	Athlete	Date	Meet	Place	Ref.
100 m	10.24 (+0.8 m/s)	David Vivas	28 July 2023	South American Championships	São Paulo, Brazil	
100 m	10.0 h (±0.0 m/s)	Horacio Esteves	15 August 1964		Caracas, Venezuela	
200 m	20.58 (+1.9 m/s)	José Acevedo	30 May 2008	NCAA Mideast Regional	Fayetteville, United States	
200 m	20.58 (+1.6 m/s)	José Acevedo	31 May 2008	NCAA Mideast Regional	Fayetteville, United States	
400 m	45.21 A	Alberth Bravo	25 November 2014	CAC Games	Xalapa, Mexico	
800 m	1:43.54	William Wuycke	7 September 1986	IAAF Grand Prix	Rieti, Italy	
1500 m	3:36.96	Eduard Villanueva	1 September 2011	World Championships	Daegu, South Korea	
3000 m	7:49.88	Freddy González	19 July 2003		Madrid, Spain	
5000 m	13:22.30	Freddy González	3 July 2004		San Sebastián, Spain	
5 km (road)	13:49	Eduardo Navas	16 February 1991		Fort Myers, United States	
10,000 m	28:31.14	Marvin Blanco	6 December 2015	Pacific 10.000 Pursuit	Sacramento, United States	
10 km (road)	28:38.6	Luis Orta	24 July 2019	Deseret News 10k	Salt Lake City, United States	
15 km (road)	44:45+	Luis Orta	24 March 2018	World Half Marathon Championships	Valencia, Spain	
20 km (road)	59:57+	Luis Orta	24 March 2018	World Half Marathon Championships	Valencia, Spain	
Half marathon	1:03:09	Luis Orta	24 March 2018	World Half Marathon Championships	Valencia, Spain	
Marathon	2:11:25	Carlos Tarazona	30 April 2000		Cleveland, United States	
110 m hurdles	13.62 A (+0.8 m/s)	Elvis Cedeño	22 July 1988		Mexico City, Mexico	
400 m hurdles	49.18	Antonio Smith	14 July 1991		Caracas, Venezuela	
3000 m steeplechase	8:20.87	José Peña	1 September 2013	ISTAF Berlin	Berlin, Germany	
High jump	2.31 m	Eure Yáñez	23 June 2017	South American Championships	Luque, Paraguay	
Pole vault	5.70 m	Ricardo Montes de Oca	9 April 2026	44 Farms Team Invitational	College Station, United States	
Long jump	8.34 m (−1.2 m/s)	Victor Castillo	30 May 2004		Cochabamba, Bolivia	
Triple jump	16.90 m (+1.4 m/s)	Leodan Torrealba	10 May 2023	Grande Prêmio Brasil Caixa de Atletismo	São Paulo, Brazil	
Shot put	20.01 m	Yojer Medina	26 August 2000		Maracaibo, Venezuela	
Discus throw	57.58 m	Jésus Parejo	8 May 2008		Caracas, Venezuela	
Hammer throw	68.54 m	Pedro Muñoz	21 February 2014		Arroyo, Puerto Rico	
Javelin throw	77.94 m	Manuel Fuenmayor	5 June 2004		Maracaibo, Venezuela	
Javelin throw	77.94 m	Billy Julio	28 November 2019		Cartagena, Colombia	
Decathlon	8048 pts	Geormi Jaramillo	4–5 May 2018	Memorial Brígido Iriarte	Barquisimeto, Venezuela	
Decathlon	100m (wind) / Long jump (wind) / Shot put / High jump / 400m / 110m H (wind) / Discus / Pole vault / Javelin / 1500m; 10.86 (−0.5 m/s) / 7.59 m (+1.3 m/s) / 16.10 m / 1.83 m / 48.56 / 14.10 (−1.8 m/s) / 44.86 m / 4.50 m / 61.60 m / 5:00.05					
5 km walk (road)	20:23+	Richard Vargas	7 May 2016	World Race Walking Team Championships	Rome, Italia	
10 km walk (road)	40:30+	Richard Vargas	7 May 2016	World Race Walking Team Championships	Rome, Italia	
15 km walk (road)	1:01:05+	Richard Vargas	7 May 2016	World Race Walking Team Championships	Rome, Italia	
20,000 m walk (track)	1:24:11.4	Richard Vargas	15 March 2014	South American Games	Santiago, Chile	
20 km walk (road)	1:22:10	Richard Vargas	7 May 2016	World Race Walking Team Championships	Rome, Italia	
20 km walk (road)	1:22:10	Richard Vargas	23 June 2018		Warsaw, Poland	
35 km walk (road)	2:48:19+	Yerenman Salazar	8 May 2016	World Race Walking Team Championships	Rome, Italia	
50 km walk (road)	4:02:48	Yerenman Salazar	8 May 2016	World Race Walking Team Championships	Rome, Italia	
4 × 100 m relay	38.88	Venezuela; Carlos Belisario; Alexis Nieves; David Vivas; Angel Gabriel Ramirez	6 August 2026	CAC Games	Santo Domingo, Dominican Republic	
4 × 200 m relay	1:25.69	Venezuela; Luis Felipe Rodríguez; Alberto Aguilar; Omar Longart; Kelvis Padrino	23 April 2017	IAAF World Relays	Nassau, Bahamas	
4 × 400 m relay	3:00.82 A	Venezuela; Arturo Ramirez; Alberto Aguilar; José Acevedo; Omar Longart	28 October 2011	Pan American Games	Guadalajara, Mexico	

=== Women ===
Event	Record	Athlete	Date	Meet	Place	Ref.
100 m	11.24 (+1.2 m/s)	Andrea Purica	29 July 2018	CAC Games	Barranquilla, Colombia	
200 m	22.53 (+0.1 m/s)	Nercely Soto	12 May 2012	Memorial Brígido Iriarte	Caracas, Venezuela	
400 m	51.94	Nercely Soto	26 November 2013	Bolivarian Games	Trujillo, Peru	
800 m	2:04.50 (Note: not recognised by World Athletics)	Yenny Mejias (Note: native born record holder as of 2021)	24 July 2004		San Felipe, Venezuela	
800 m	2:04.93	Yenny Mejias	24 July 2005	South American Championships	Cali, Colombia	
1500 m	4:07.27	Joselyn Brea (Note: Joselyn Daniely Brea has dual Spanish and Venezuelan nationality)	22 April 2023	Payton Jordan Invitational	Palo Alto, United States	
Mile	4:27.41	Joselyn Brea (Note: Joselyn Daniely Brea has dual Spanish and Venezuelan nationality)	21 July 2023	Herculis	Fontvieille, Monaco	
3000 m	8:43.26	Joselyn Brea (Note: Joselyn Daniely Brea has dual Spanish and Venezuelan nationality)	16 July 2023	Kamila Skolimowska Memorial	Chorzów, Poland	
5000 m	14:36.59	Joselyn Brea (Note: Joselyn Daniely Brea has dual Spanish and Venezuelan nationality)	17 May 2024	Los Angeles Grand Prix	Los Angeles, United States	
5 km (road)	16:04+	Joselyn Brea (Note: Joselyn Daniely Brea has dual Spanish and Venezuelan nationality)	15 January 2023	10K Valencia Ibercaja	Valencia, Spain	
10,000 m	32:29.73	Edymar Brea	25 March 2023		Burjassot, Spain	
10 km (road)	31:47	Edymar Brea	16 February 2025	10K Facsa Castellón	Castellón, Spain	
10 km (road)	31:23 a	Edymar Brea	24 November 2024	Zara Speed Run	Madrid, Spain	
15 km (road)	52:03	Edymar Brea	16 February 2019		Valencia, Spain	
20 km (road)	1:10:43+	Megaly García	3 December 2023	Valencia Marathon	Valencia, Spain	
Half marathon	1:13:25	Joselyn Daniely Brea (Note: Joselyn Daniely Brea has dual Spanish and Venezuelan nationality)	19 March 2023	CAF Marathon 21K	Caracas, Venezuela	
25 km (road)	1:28:53+	Megaly García	3 December 2023	Valencia Marathon	Valencia, Spain	
30 km (road)	1:47:08+	Megaly García	3 December 2023	Valencia Marathon	Valencia, Spain	
Marathon	2:31:45 (Note: by official result and World Athletics sources; 2:31:44 by FVA source)	Megaly García	3 December 2023	Valencia Marathon	Valencia, Spain	
100 m hurdles	12.87 (+1.8 m/s)	Yoveiny Mota	28 May 2022	NCAA West Preliminary Round	Fayetteville, United States	
400 m hurdles	56.65	Magdalena Mendoza	13 June 2015	South American Championships	Lima, Peru	
3000 m steeplechase	10:21.93	Joselyn Daniely Brea (Note: Joselyn Daniely Brea has dual Spanish and Venezuelan nationality)	9 July 2016		Palencia, Spain	
High jump	1.90 m	Marierlis Rojas	29 March 2008		Ponce, Puerto Rico	
Pole vault	4.70 m A (Note: indoor mark ratified as absolute record)	Robeilys Peinado	7 June 2018	South American Games	Cochabamba, Bolivia	
Pole vault	4.70 m (Note: indoor mark ratified as absolute record)	Robeilys Peinado	6 September 2019	Diamond League	Brussels, Belgium	
Pole vault	4.70 m	Robeilys Peinado	29 September 2019	World Championships	Doha, Qatar	
Long jump	6.88 m (+1.4 m/s)	Yulimar Rojas	13 June 2021	Spanish Clubs Championship	La Nucia, Spain	
Long jump	6.93 m (+0.4 m/s) (Note: Performance annulled because Rojas used her triple jump spikes.)	Yulimar Rojas	8 June 2022	XXI Reunión Ciudad de Guadalajara	Guadalajara, Spain	
Triple jump	15.67 m (+0.7 m/s) (Note: indoor mark ratified as absolute record)	Yulimar Rojas	1 August 2021	Olympic Games	Tokyo, Japan	
Shot put	18.19 m	Ahymará Espinoza	15 May 2016	Ibero-American Championships	Rio de Janeiro, Brazil	
Discus throw	55.57 m	María Cubillán	3 July 2009	Central American and Caribbean Championships	Havana, Cuba	
Hammer throw	73.64 m	Rosa Rodríguez	17 May 2013	21st Viloria Memorial	Barquisimeto, Venezuela	
Javelin throw	59.33 m	Yusbelis Parra	22 June 2012		Havana, Cuba	
Heptathlon	5989 pts	Luisarys Toledo	25–26 May 2019	South American Championships	Lima, Peru	
Heptathlon	100m H (wind) / High jump / Shot put / 200m (wind) / Long jump (wind) / Javelin / 800m; 14.12 (±0.0 m/s) / 1.69 m / 12.84 m / 24.56 (+0.9 m/s) / 6.22 m (+1.0 m/s) / 43.79 m / 2:15.67					
10,000 m walk (track)	46:40.22	Milángela Rosales	4 June 2010	Ibero-American Championships	San Fernando, Spain	
20,000 m walk (track)	1:32:17.6 h	Milángela Rosales	5 June 2011	South American Championships	Buenos Aires, Argentina	
20 km walk (road)	1:32:18	Milángela Rosales	5 June 2011		Buenos Aires, Argentina	
4 × 100 m relay	43.53 A	Venezuela; Nediam Vargas; Andrea Purica; Nelsibeth Villalobos; Nercelis Soto	28 November 2014	CAC Games	Xalapa, Mexico	
4 × 400 m relay	3:34.30	Venezuela; Wilmary Álvarez; Ángela Alfonso; Yusmely García; Eliana Pacheco	22 June 2003	South American Championships	Barquisimeto, Venezuela	

=== Mixed ===
Event	Record	Athlete	Date	Meet	Place	Ref.
4 × 100 m relay	41.79	Venezuela; Bryant Alamo; Orangy Jiménez; Alexis Nieves; Glanyernis Guerra	4 August 2026	CAC Games	Santo Domingo, Dominican Republic	
4 × 400 m relay	3:20.44	Venezuela; Javier Gómez; Kelvis Padrino; Nahomy García; Waleska Ortiz	5 December 2025	Bolivarian Games	Lima, Peru	

== Indoor ==
=== Men ===
Event	Record	Athlete	Date	Meet	Place	Ref.
60 m	6.63 A	David Vivas	19 February 2022	South American Championships	Cochabamba, Bolivia	
200 m	20.99	José Acevedo	14 March 2008	NCAA Division I Championships	Fayetteville, United States	
400 m	46.70	Kelvis Padrino	20 March 2026	World Championships	Toruń, Poland	
400 m	46.47 OT	Luis Luna	24 February 2007		Lexington, United States	
600 m	1:21.23	Jose Peñalver	10 January 2020	UAB Blazer Invitational	Birmingham, United States	
800 m	1:48.51	William Wuycke	24 February 1989	BW-Bank Meeting	Karlsruhe, Germany	
1500 m	3:50.20	Miguel Angel García Pérez	1 March 2003	Spanish Championships	Valencia, Spain	
3000 m	8:02.18	German Beltran	11 March 1989		Indianapolis, United States	
60 m hurdles	7.29	Gerson Izaguirre	29 January 2023		Aubière, France	
High jump	2.23 m	Eure Yáñez	13 February 2018		Sabadell, Spain	
Pole vault	5.57 m	Ricardo Montes de Oca	18 January 2025	Virginia Tech Invitational	Blacksburg, United States	
Long jump	8.00 m A	Victor Castillo	5 February 2005		Flagstaff, United States	
Triple jump	16.55 m A	Leodan Torrealba	20 February 2022	South American Championships	Cochabamba, Bolivia	
Shot put	19.56 m	Ronny Jiménez	28 February 2004		Lincoln, United States	
Heptathlon	5157 pts	Gersan Izaguirre	18–19 December 2021		Ourense, Spain	
Heptathlon	60m / Long jump / Shot put / High jump / 60m H / Pole vault / 1000m; 7.30 / 6.87 m / 12.75 m / 1.85 m / 8.34 / 4.41 m / 3:02.59					
5000 m walk	25:05.92	Júlio Teran	30 January 2016		Pombal, Portugal	
4 × 400 m relay	3:07.05	Venezuela; Axel Gomez; Ryan Ignaiker Lopez Parra; Javier Gómez; Kelvis Padrino	22 March 2026	World Championships	Toruń, Poland	

=== Women ===
Event	Record	Athlete	Date	Meet	Place	Ref.
60 m	7.20	Andrea Purica	14 February 2017	Czech Indoor Gala	Ostrava, Czech Republic	
200 m	24.04	Nercely Soto	6 March 2020		Lynchburg, United States	
400 m	53.65	Luisairys Toledo	8 March 2024	NCAA Division II Championships	Pittsburg, United States	
600 y	1:19.66	Luisairys Toledo	26 February 2023	MIAA Championships	Pittsburg, United States	
800 m	2:07.54	Luisairys Toledo	11 March 2023	NCAA Division II Championships	Virginia Beach, United States	
1500 m	4:42.24y	Valentina Medina	23 February 2002		Lincoln, United States	
Mile	4:42.24	Valentina Medina	23 February 2002		Lincoln, United States	
3000 m	9:04.67	Joselyn Daniely Brea (Note: Joselyn Daniely Brea has dual Spanish and Venezuelan nationality)	8 February 2022		Sabadell, Spain	
60 m hurdles	7.99	Yoveinny Mota	19 March 2022	World Championships	Belgrade, Serbia	
High jump	1.72 m	Yoveinny Mota	29 January 2022		Lubbock, United States	
Pole vault	4.78 m	Robeilys Peinado	19 February 2020	Meeting Hauts de France Pas de Calais	Liévin, France	
Long jump	6.81 m	Yulimar Rojas	17 February 2022	Meeting Hauts-de-France Pas-de-Calais	Liévin, France	
Triple jump	15.74 m	Yulimar Rojas	20 March 2022	World Championships	Belgrade, Serbia	
Shot put	15.86 m	Ahymara Espinoza	23 February 2020		Novo Mesto, Slovenia	
Pentathlon	3961 pts	Nediam Vargas	29 February 2020		Ourense, Spain	
Pentathlon	60m H / High jump / Shot put / Long jump / 800m; 8.53 / 1.55 m / 12.78 m / 5.74 m / 2:22.60					
3000 m walk	14:07.79	Natalia Alfonzo	17 February 2017		Elsah, France	
3000 m walk	13:49.84 OT	Natalia Alfonzo	3 March 2017		Johnson City, United States	
4 × 400 m relay						
