= 2019 World Athletics Championships – Women's triple jump =

Women's Triple Jump event at the 2019 World Championships

Women's triple jump at the 2019 World Championships
- Venue: Khalifa International Stadium
- Dates: 3 October (qualification); 5 October (final)
- Competitors: 26 from 17 nations
- Winning distance: 15.37

Medalists
| gold medal | Yulimar Rojas | Venezuela |
| silver medal | Shanieka Ricketts | Jamaica |
| bronze medal | Caterine Ibargüen | Colombia |

Video on YouTube Official Video

The women's triple jump at the 2019 World Athletics Championships was held at the Khalifa International Stadium in Doha, Qatar, from 3 to 5 October 2019.

== Summary ==
Just a month before this event, Yulimar Rojas jumped 15.41m for the #2 mark in history. It was almost half a metre longer than world #2 Shanieka Ricketts. #6 of all time Caterine Ibargüen was also in this competition and has been in that neighborhood in the past, but hadn't jumped over 15 metres since 2016. At 35, she had already set the Masters world record twice this season.

As the third jumper in the finals, Rickets put her first effort out at 14.81m. The next jumper up was Rojas jumping marginally better with a 14.87m. The next best jumper in the first round was Kimberly Williams with a 14.64m, her personal best. As her second attempt, Rojas landed 15.37 m (50 ft 5 in) (-0.6) meaning into a slight headwind. It was the #4 jump in history, with only Françoise Mbango Etone's winning jump from the 2008 Olympics separating it from her own #2. Game. Set. Match.

Later in the round, Williams duplicated her personal best and held on to third place until the fifth round, when Ibargüen took the bronze away with a 14.73m. On her third attempt, the crowd was silenced for a moment as Rojas flew beyond the world record, but the jump was ruled a foul as she took off more than half a shoe length beyond the take off board. Inconsequential to the results, Rojas' fourth attempt of 15.18m equaled the #26 jump in history and was the sixth longest ancillary jump in history.

== Records ==
Before the competition records were as follows:

| Record | Perf. | Athlete | Nat. | Date | Location |
|---|---|---|---|---|---|
| World | 15.50 | Inessa Kravets | UKR | 10 Aug 1995 | Gothenburg, Sweden |
| Championship | 15.50 | Inessa Kravets | UKR | 10 Aug 1995 | Gothenburg, Sweden |
| World leading | 15.41 m (50 ft 6 1/2 in) | Yulimar Rojas | VEN | 6 Sep 2019 | Andújar, Spain |
| South American | 15.41 m (50 ft 6 1/2 in) | Yulimar Rojas | VEN | 6 Sep 2019 | Andújar, Spain |
| African | 15.39 | Françoise Mbango Etone | CMR | 17 Aug 2008 | Beijing, China |
| Asian | 15.25 | Olga Rypakova | KAZ | 4 Sep 2010 | Split, Croatia |
| NACAC | 15.29 | Yamilé Aldama | CUB | 11 Jul 2003 | Rome, Italy |
| European | 15.50 | Inessa Kravets | UKR | 10 Aug 1995 | Gothenburg, Sweden |
| Oceanian | 14.04 | Nicole Mladenis | AUS | 9 Mar 2002 | Hobart, Australia |
| Oceanian | 14.04 | Nicole Mladenis | AUS | 7 Dec 2003 | Perth, Australia |

== Schedule ==
The event schedule, in local time (UTC+3), is as follows:

| Date | Time | Round |
|---|---|---|
| 3 October | 16:40 | Qualification |
| 5 October | 20:35 | Final |

== Results ==
=== Qualification ===
Qualification: Qualifying Performance 14.30 (Q) or at least 12 best performers (q) advanced to the final.

| Rank | Group | Name | Nationality | Round | | | Mark | Notes |
| Rank | Group | Name | Nationality | 1 | 2 | 3 | Mark | Notes |
|---|---|---|---|---|---|---|---|---|
| 1 | A | Shanieka Ricketts | Jamaica | 14.42 | | | 14.42 | Q |
| 2 | A | Caterine Ibargüen | Colombia | 13.97 | 14.32 | | 14.32 | Q |
| 3 | A | Olha Saladukha | Ukraine | x | x | 14.32 | 14.32 | Q |
| 4 | B | Yulimar Rojas | Venezuela | x | 14.31 | | 14.31 | Q |
| 5 | A | Keturah Orji | United States | 14.30 | | | 14.30 | Q |
| 6 | A | Kristiina Mäkelä | Finland | 14.26 | 14.10 | 14.06 | 14.26 | q |
| 7 | B | Rouguy Diallo | France | 14.25 | 14.04 | x | 14.25 | q |
| 8 | B | Ana Peleteiro | Spain | 14.11 | 14.23 | – | 14.23 | q |
| 9 | B | Tori Franklin | United States | 14.23 | x | 13.86 | 14.23 | q |
| 10 | A | Patrícia Mamona | Portugal | 14.21 | 11.95 | 14.18 | 14.21 | q |
| 11 | B | Kimberly Williams | Jamaica | 14.20 | 13.75 | 13.73 | 14.20 | q |
| 12 | B | Andreea Panturoiu | Romania | x | 14.12 | 14.02 | 14.12 | q |
| 13 | B | Olga Rypakova | Kazakhstan | 14.09 | 14.05 | x | 14.09 | |
| 14 | B | Dovilė Kilty | Lithuania | 14.01 | 14.09 | 12.62 | 14.09 | |
| 15 | B | Liadagmis Povea | Cuba | 14.01 | 14.08 | 13.98 | 14.08 | |
| 16 | A | Gabriela Petrova | Bulgaria | 13.84 | 13.98 | x | 13.98 | |
| 17 | B | Ottavia Cestonaro | Italy | x | 13.97 | x | 13.97 | |
| 18 | A | Evelise Veiga | Portugal | 13.48 | 13.89 | 13.58 | 13.89 | |
| 19 | B | Yosiris Urrutia | Colombia | x | 13.77 | 13.73 | 13.77 | |
| 20 | B | Susana Costa | Portugal | 13.71 | 13.77 | 13.65 | 13.77 | |
| 21 | A | Iryna Vaskouskaya | Belarus | 13.67 | 13.57 | 12.48 | 13.67 | |
| 22 | A | Diana Zagainova | Lithuania | 13.58 | x | 13.64 | 13.64 | |
| 23 | A | Patricia Sarrapio | Spain | 13.58 | 13.40 | 13.46 | 13.58 | |
| 24 | A | Liuba Zaldívar | Ecuador | 13.48 | 13.56 | 13.16 | 13.56 | |
| 25 | B | Anna Krasutska | Ukraine | 13.16 | 13.14 | 13.09 | 13.16 | |
| 26 | B | Aleksandra Nacheva | Bulgaria | 13.05 | x | 12.71 | 13.05 | |
| | A | Thea LaFond | Dominica | DNS | | | | |
| | A | Yanis David | France | DNS | | | | |

=== Final ===
The final was started on 5 October at 20:35.

| Rank | Name | Nationality | Round | | | | | | Mark | Notes |
| Rank | Name | Nationality | 1 | 2 | 3 | 4 | 5 | 6 | Mark | Notes |
|---|---|---|---|---|---|---|---|---|---|---|
| 1st place, gold medalist(s) | Yulimar Rojas | Venezuela | 14.87 | 15.37 | x | 15.18 | 14.77 | x | 15.37 | |
| 2nd place, silver medalist(s) | Shanieka Ricketts | Jamaica | 14.81 | 14.76 | 14.92 | 14.72 | 14.85 | x | 14.92 | |
| 3rd place, bronze medalist(s) | Caterine Ibargüen | Colombia | 14.16 | x | 14.40 | 14.46 | 14.73 | 14.47 | 14.73 | |
| 4 | Kimberly Williams | Jamaica | 14.64 | 14.64 | 14.53 | x | x | 14.17 | 14.64 | PB |
| 5 | Olha Saladukha | Ukraine | 14.52 | 14.40 | x | 12.34 | 14.25 | 14.05 | 14.52 | SB |
| 6 | Ana Peleteiro | Spain | 14.47 | 13.41 | x | 14.27 | 14.20 | 14.20 | 14.47 | |
| 7 | Keturah Orji | United States | x | 14.46 | x | 14.37 | 14.24 | 14.45 | 14.46 | |
| 8 | Patrícia Mamona | Portugal | 14.40 | 14.34 | 14.30 | 14.17 | x | x | 14.40 | |
| 9 | Tori Franklin | United States | 14.07 | x | 14.08 | | | | 14.08 | |
| 10 | Rouguy Diallo | France | x | x | 14.08 | | | | 14.08 | |
| 11 | Andreea Panturoiu | Romania | 14.07 | x | x | | | | 14.07 | |
| 12 | Kristiina Mäkelä | Finland | 13.81 | 13.99 | 13.74 | | | | 13.99 | |
