= Joselyn Brea =

Spanish-Venezuelan athlete (born 1994)

Personal information
- Full name: Joselyn Daniely Brea Abreu
- National team: Venezuela
- Born: 12 August 1994 (age 31) Valencia

Sport
- Sport: Duathlon, track and field
Medal record
Women's athletics
Representing Venezuela
Pan American Games
Gold medal – first place	2023 Santiago	1500 m
Gold medal – first place	2023 Santiago	5000 m
Women's Duathlon
World Triathlon Duathlon Championships
Gold medal – first place	2021 Aviles	Individual
Gold medal – first place	2022 Targu Mures	Individual

Joselyn Daniely Brea Abreu (Note: In this Spanish name, the first or paternal surname is Brea and the second or maternal family name is Abreu.) (born 12 August 1994) is a Spanish-Venezuelan athlete who competes in the duathlon and track and field. She won two gold medals at the Duathlon World Championships in 2021 and 2022.

== Duathlon ==
Brea is a two-time world champion in the duathlon. In the 2021 world championships, she won the race with a time of 2:00:19. The following year, in 2022, she again won the race in a time of 1:54.30.

== Track and field ==
Brea competed alongside her sister, Edymar, in the 5000m at the 2022 World Athletics Championships. In April 2023, Brea ran 14:47.76 in the 5000, becoming the first South American athlete in history to break 15 minutes in the event. In July 2023, she broke the South American mile record, running 4:27.41 at the Monaco Diamond League. She finished 13th in the race. Every competitor ran a personal best, and seven national records were broken.

She set a new outdoors personal best and South American record over 5000m, running 14:36.59 at the Los Angeles Grand Prix on 17 May 2024.

== Results and personal bests ==
Track and field personal bests

Taken from IAAF profile

Surface	Event	Time	Venue	Date	Notes
Indoor track	3000m	9:04.67	Sabadell, Spain	8 February 2022	NR
Outdoor track	1500m	4:05.78	Atlanta, US	31 May 2024	
Outdoor track	One mile	4:27.41	Monaco	21 July 2023	AR
Outdoor track	3000m	8:43.26	Chorzów, Poland	16 July 2023	AR
Outdoor track	5000m	14:36.59	Los Angeles	17 May 2024	AR
Outdoor track	10,000m	34:10.63	Maia, Portugal	9 April 2016	
Outdoor track	3000m steeplechase	10:21.93	Palencia, Spain	9 July 2016	NR
Road	10k	32:05	Valencia, Spain	15 January 2023	
Road	Half marathon	1:13:25	Caracas, Venezuela	19 March 2023	

Track and field championship results

Taken from IAAF profile

Year	Meet	Venue	Event	Place	Time
2016	Spanish Athletics Championships	Las Mestas Sports Complex; Gijón, Spain	5000m	4th	16:13.80
2020	Spanish Athletics Championships	Estadio de Vallehermoso; Madrid, Spain	5000m	OC	16:12.54
2021	Venezuelan Athletics Championships	Barinas, Venezuela	1500m	1st	4:12.92
2021	Venezuelan Athletics Championships	Barinas, Venezuela	5000m	1st	15:21.41
2021	South American Championships	Estadio Modelo Alberto Spencer Herrera; Guayaquil, Ecuador	1500m	1st	4:15.05
2021	South American Championships	Estadio Modelo Alberto Spencer Herrera; Guayaquil, Ecuador	5000m	3rd	15:48.24
2022	Ibero-American Championships	Estadi Olímpic Camilo Cano; Torrevieja, Spain	5000m	1st	16:08.83
2022	World Athletics Championships	Hayward Field; Eugene, United States	5000m	H2 16th	15:46.75
2022	South American Games	Luque, Paraguay	1500m	4th	4:16.64
2022	South American Games	Luque, Paraguay	5000m	2nd	15:42.70
2023	Central American and Caribbean Games	San Salvador, El Salvador	1500m	1st	4:10.39 GR
2023	Central American and Caribbean Games	San Salvador, El Salvador	5000m	1st	15:10.60
2023	Central American and Caribbean Games	San Salvador, El Salvador	Half marathon	1st	1:15:04
2023	World Athletics Championships	National Athletics Centre Budapest, Hungary	5000m	H2 10th	15:11.16
2023	Pan American Games	Julio Martínez National Stadium, Chile	5000m	1st	16:04.12

Triathlon championship results

Taken from World Triathlon profile

Year	Race	Venue	Distance	Place	Time
2020	Spanish Triathlon National Championships	Pontevedra, Spain	Sprint	10th	1:03:22
2019	Triathlon West Asian Championships	Bahrain, Bahrain	Sprint	1st	1:05:28
2019	Spanish Triathlon National Championships	A Coruña, Spain	Olympic	6th	2:04:59
2018	ETU Triathlon European Cup	Valencia, Spain	Olympic	8th	2:01:54
2018	ETU Sprint Triathlon European Cup	Gran Canaria, Spain	Sprint	19th	1:07:00
2017	ITU Triathlon World Cup	Huelva, Spain	Olympic	16th	2:07:08
2017	ETU Triathlon European Cup and Mediterranean Championships	Altafulla, Spain	Sprint	13th	1:07:16

Duathlon championship results

Taken from World Triathlon profile

Year	Race	Venue	Distance	Place	Time
2022	World Games	Birmingham, USA	Standard	3rd	2:02:42
2022	World Triathlon Duathlon Championships	Târgu Mureș, Romania	Standard	1st	1:54:30
2022	Spanish Duathlon National Championships	Avilés, Spain	Sprint	1st	57:15
2021	World Triathlon Duathlon Championships	Avilés, Spain	Standard	1st	2:00:19
2020	ITU Triathlon World Cup	Valencia, Spain	Sprint	30th	1:03:56
2020	Spanish Duathlon National Championships	Soria, Spain	Sprint	4th	1:01:16
2020	ETU Duathlon European Championships	Punta Umbria, Spain	Sprint	3rd	1:00:01

== Personal life ==
Brea's sister, Edymar Brea, is also a world class athlete. The two competed together in the 5000m at the 2022 World Athletics Championships.
