= Yerenman Salazar =

Venezuelan racewalker

Yerenman Asdrubal Salazar Guzman (born October 24, 1978) is a Venezuelan racewalker. He competed at the 2016 Summer Olympics in the men's 50 kilometres walk but did not finish the race.
