= Richard Vargas =

Venezuelan racewalker

Personal information
- Full name: Richard Egrey Vargas Carrillo
- Born: 28 December 1994 (age 31)

Sport
- Country: Venezuela
- Sport: Track and field
- Event: racewalking
- Updated on 29 August 2015

Richard Egrey Vargas Carrillo (born 28 December 1994) is a male Venezuelan racewalker. He competed in the 20 kilometres walk event at the 2015 World Championships in Athletics in Beijing, China. In 2019, he competed in the men's 20 kilometres walk at the 2019 World Athletics Championships held in Doha, Qatar. He did not finish his race.

== See also ==
- Venezuela at the 2015 World Championships in Athletics
