= Yulimar Rojas =

Venezuelan athlete

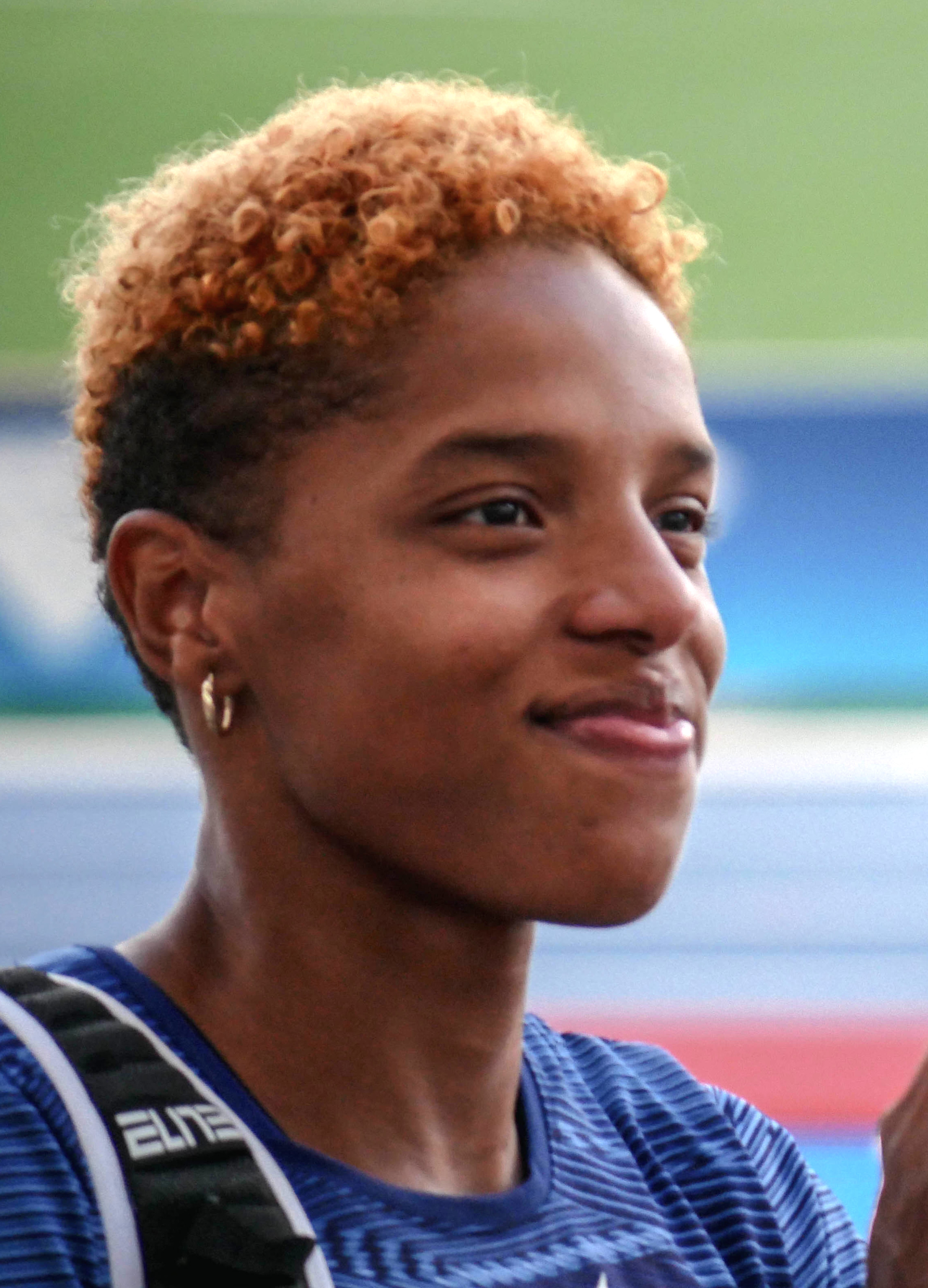
- Rojas in 2019

Personal information
- Born: 21 October 1995 (age 31) Caracas, Venezuela
- Height: 1.92 m (6 ft 4 in)
- Weight: 72 kg (159 lb)

Sport
- Country: Venezuela
- Sport: Athletics
- Events: Triple jump, long jump
- Team: FC Barcelona Athletics
- Coached by: Iván Pedroso

Achievements and titles
- Highest world ranking: 1st (2023)
- Personal bests: Outdoor; Triple jump: 15.67 m (51 ft 4 3/4 in) WR (Tokyo 2021); Long jump: 7.27 m (23 ft 10 in) w (La Nucia 2021) 6.88 m (22 ft 6 3/4 in) NR (La Nucia 2021); Indoor; Triple jump: 15.74 m (51 ft 7 1/2 in) i WR (Belgrade 2022); Long jump: 6.81 m (22 ft 4 in) i NR (Liévin 2022)
Medal record
Women's athletics
Representing Venezuela
Olympic Games
Gold medal – first place	2020 Tokyo	Triple jump
Silver medal – second place	2016 Rio de Janeiro	Triple jump
World Championships
Gold medal – first place	2017 London	Triple jump
Gold medal – first place	2019 Doha	Triple jump
Gold medal – first place	2022 Eugene	Triple jump
Gold medal – first place	2023 Budapest	Triple jump
Bronze medal – third place	2025 Tokyo	Triple jump
World Indoor Championships
Gold medal – first place	2016 Portland	Triple jump
Gold medal – first place	2018 Birmingham	Triple jump
Gold medal – first place	2022 Belgrade	Triple jump
Silver medal – second place	2026 Toruń	Triple jump
Diamond League
First place	2021	Triple jump
First place	2022	Triple jump
First place	2023	Triple jump
Pan American Games
Gold medal – first place	2019 Lima	Triple jump
South American Games
Gold medal – first place	2014 Santiago	High jump
South American Championships
Gold medal – first place	2015 Lima	Triple jump
Silver medal – second place	2017 Asunción	Triple jump

Yulimar Rojas Rodríguez (Spanish pronunciation: [ɟʝuliˈmaɾ ˈroxas roˈðɾiɣes], also known as Yolimar Rojas; born 21 October 1995) is a Venezuelan athlete who holds the world record for women's triple jump, at 15.74 m (51 ft 7 1/2 in). She is the 2020 Olympic champion, a four-time World Champion (2017 London, 2019 Doha, 2022 Eugene and 2023 Budapest), and three-time World Indoor Champion (2016 Portland, 2018 Birmingham and 2022 Belgrade); she is nicknamed la reina del triple salto – queen of the triple jump. Since 2014 she has held, and continued to beat, Venezuelan national records in triple jump and long jump. She is a recipient of the Venezuelan Order of José Félix Ribas – First Class.

Raised in a deprived area of Venezuela, Rojas was successful in other sports as a teenager but struggled to practice due to lack of resources. Encouraged to move into athletics, she excelled in high jump and sprinting before developing an affinity for the triple jump. She moved to Guadalajara, Spain, in 2015 to continue her athletics training under coach Iván Pedroso, and became dominant in the event. After several years specialising only in the triple jump, she began seriously competing in the long jump again in 2021.

== Early life ==
Yulimar Rojas Rodríguez was born in Caracas on 21 October 1995 and raised in a ranchito (shack, lit. 'little ranch') in the Altavista area of Pozuelos, Anzoátegui; her family had moved there so that her stepfather could find work in the oil industry. She is one of six siblings, and has said that growing up in a large, poor family gave her drive to overcome adversities, which helped her career. Their ranchito has since been destroyed in bad weather; the family was given better housing in 2014 following Rojas's success. In 2021, Rojas told RTVE that she had grown up only seeking to have some dignity in life, but, after she began competing, she had promised her mother, Yulecsy Rodríguez, that one day she would buy her a small house with walls, and strove to be able to make good on that promise. Her early coaches reflected that, despite being talented and persevering, Rojas could not have become a successful athlete if she had not left the country in 2015, as she would not have had access to food and medical treatment to stay healthy.

Inspired by the Venezuelan delegation at the 2008 Summer Olympics, Rojas, a tall child, wanted to become a volleyball player, but there was no nearby team. She also played basketball, but similarly could not find coaches. Rojas was accepted to a specialist sports school and her stepfather, former boxer Pedro Zapata, told her to try athletics rather than volleyball. She was also encouraged to try athletics under coach Jesús "Tuqueque" Velásquez at the Simón Bolívar Sports Complex in Puerto la Cruz. Velásquez told AFP that, though the stadium was financed by the government at the time, Rojas and other young athletes had to help dig the sandpit where they could practice jumps, under a jujube tree. The Simón Bolívar Sports Complex is part of the facilities of the José Antonio Anzoátegui Stadium; two of Rojas's sisters, Yerilda and Yorgelys Zapata, are also athletes, and train in throwing events at this stadium.

Rojas's first athletic event was shot put, and while she won her first competition she chose to explore other sports. Aged 15 she entered her first high jump competition. She has cited triple jumper Asnoldo Devonish, Venezuela's only athletics Olympic medalist prior to Rojas herself, as an inspiration in her development.

== Career ==
=== 2011–2015: Career beginnings ===
Showing young promise, Rojas was invited to international competitions, but her estranged father would not give permission for her to leave the country until there was a championship held in neighboring Colombia, the 2011 South American Junior Championships. The event was Rojas's first high jump competition, and, aged 15, she won the event and set a new national youth record, ranking #11 in the world that year. Due to this win, she received her first spike shoes, given to her by Marco Oviedo of the Venezuelan Athletics Federation (FVA) after her coach Velásquez challenged the FVA to start supporting her if she won. She was then defeated at the 2012 Youth championships, managing only fourth, but performed better in higher-level competitions that year, jumping 1.75 m (5 ft 8 3/4 in) to take sixth at the Ibero-American Championships and claiming the bronze medal at the South American Under-23 Championships.

In the 2013 season, she improved her personal best to 1.87 m (6 ft 1 1/2 in) with a high jump in Barquisimeto, taking the South American junior record. She also registered a 6.17 m (20 ft 2 3/4 in) long jump and an 11.94 s 100 m sprint. This year she won two international silver medals, at the 2013 Pan American Junior Athletics Championships (losing to Daniellys Garay on countback) and the Bolivarian Games. At the Bolivarian Games she competed in the long jump for the first time, placing sixth. Improving in her new event, she had a best of 6.23 m (20 ft 5 1/4 in) in long jump that year.

Rojas then began regularly competing in both horizontal and vertical jump events from 2014. Starting with the South American Games in March, she claimed her first senior gold medal in the high jump. An appearance in the horizontal jumps followed at the World Junior Championships, where she came 11th in the long jump and 17th overall in the triple jump. She won her first gold medal in the long jump Pan American Sports Festival that year and, in recognition, she was chosen to lead the returning delegation back to Venezuela and was presented with a national flag by Tony Álvarez, the Minister of Youth and Sports. A long jump/triple jump double followed at the 2014 South American Under-23 Championships in Athletics, which included a championship record of 6.36 m (20 ft 10 1/4 in) in the long jump. At senior level, she narrowly missed out on medals in both disciplines at the 2014 Central American and Caribbean Games, placing fourth in each.

She said that she became more attracted to the triple jump in 2014, and convinced Velásquez to let her change primary discipline. Shortly thereafter, she took the Venezuelan under-20 record, achieving 13.65 m (44 ft 9 1/4 in). The FVA said that she was a promising natural athlete, noting her unique style of not taking a proper step and believing she could jump much further if taught proper technique.

Rojas established herself as her country's best all-time jumper at the 2015 Venezuelan Championships, setting national records of 6.57 m (21 ft 6 1/2 in) and 14.17 m (46 ft 5 3/4 in) to win the long jump and triple jump events. Aged 19, she won gold on her debut at the senior level with the triple jump title at the 2015 South American Championships. She then took silver in the event at the 2015 Military World Games.

=== 2016–2021: Triple jump specialist ===
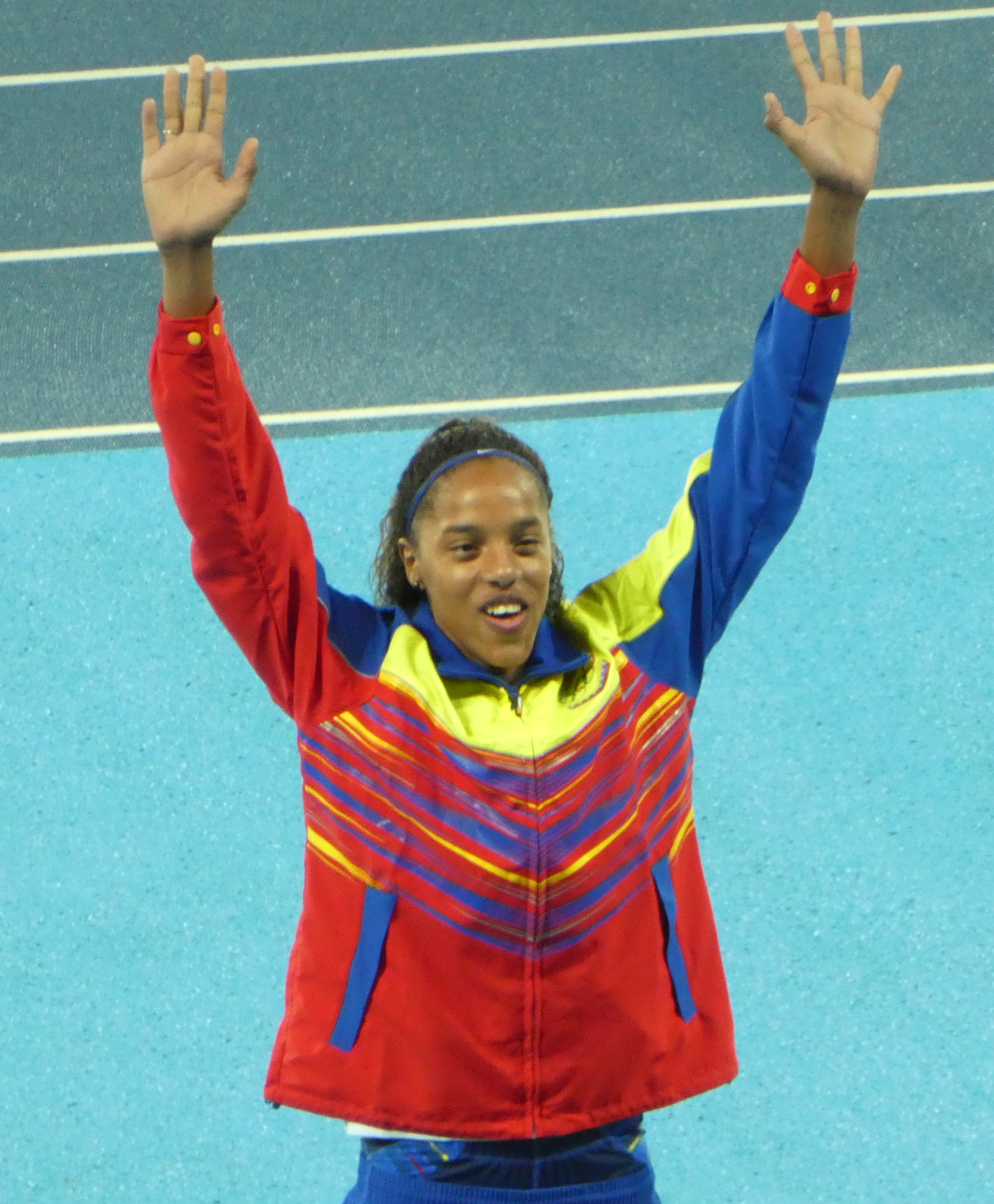
Rojas at the 2016 Rio Olympics

Since 2015, she has been coached by Cuban long jumper Iván Pedroso, to whom she sent a Facebook message after the social network's algorithm suggested she connect with him. Pedroso responded, saying he believed she had potential and inviting her to train with him in Spain. At this point, she moved to Guadalajara, Spain, where Pedroso is based, to live and train. She then officially signed with FC Barcelona to their athletics division on 21 November 2016, with her measurements listed as 192 cm and 72 kg. She said that she was proud to represent the club, which she had long supported, with the club saying that she is "without doubt the most honored international athlete the Club has ever had". The club had pursued signing her on recommendation of their and Rojas's mutual sponsor, Nike, while Rojas was keen to join the club as she supported the FC Barcelona football team.

Rojas won the silver medal in the triple jump at the Rio de Janeiro 2016 Olympic Games with a 14.98 m (49 ft 1 3/4 in), placing behind Colombian Caterine Ibargüen, who took the gold after a jump of 15.17 m (49 ft 9 in). Rojas became the first Venezuelan woman to win an Olympic medal, doing so in the same event in which the nation had won their very first Olympic medal with Devonish's 1952 bronze. The national reaction to her medal was overwhelming; Venezuelan president Nicolás Maduro boasted on television that the country was becoming a "sporting superpower" and fulfilling its 2008 promise of a "generation of gold", despite Rojas's silver being the highest accolade of their three medals.

On 7 August 2017, Rojas won her first outdoor World Championship, winning against Ibargüen and becoming the first Venezuelan athlete in history to obtain a gold medal in the championships. In her fifth attempt, Rojas jumped 14.91 m (48 ft 11 in), 2 centimeters further than rival Ibargüen. She said that the win "came at both the best and the worst moment for Venezuela", hoping that having a world champion could bring hope to Venezuela, which was in the midst of the 2017 Venezuelan protests. Rojas spent much of 2018 off due to injury, during which Ibargüen led the sport, then returned to competing in 2019. In February 2020, she broke the women's indoor triple jump record at the Meeting Villa de Madrid; on her fourth jump she broke her own South American record of 15.29 m (50 ft 1 3/4 in), then with her final jump landed 15.43 m (50 ft 7 1/4 in). At the time, it broke her own absolute record and became the second-furthest of all female triple jumps.

Despite jumping a world-lead long jump (wind assisted) in competition in 2021, Rojas chose to only contest the triple jump at the 2020 Tokyo Olympics. She was chosen to be a flagbearer for Venezuela at the opening ceremony, but missed the parade. On 1 August 2021, Rojas won the gold medal at Tokyo 2020. With her first jump, she set a new Olympic record of 15.41 m (50 ft 6 1/2 in), beating Françoise Mbango's 15.39 m (50 ft 5 3/4 in) record set at Beijing 2008; on her final attempt, she improved this to 15.67 m (51 ft 4 3/4 in) (5.86 m hop, 3.82 m skip, 5.99 m jump), also breaking the world record, which had previously been held by Inessa Kravets since 1995 with 15.50 m (50 ft 10 in). Rojas is Venezuela's first female Olympic gold medalist, and also Venezuela's first athletic gold and third gold medalist overall. Due to her dominance in the event, Rojas has been nicknamed la reina del triple salto – queen of the triple jump.

=== 2022: Dual events ===
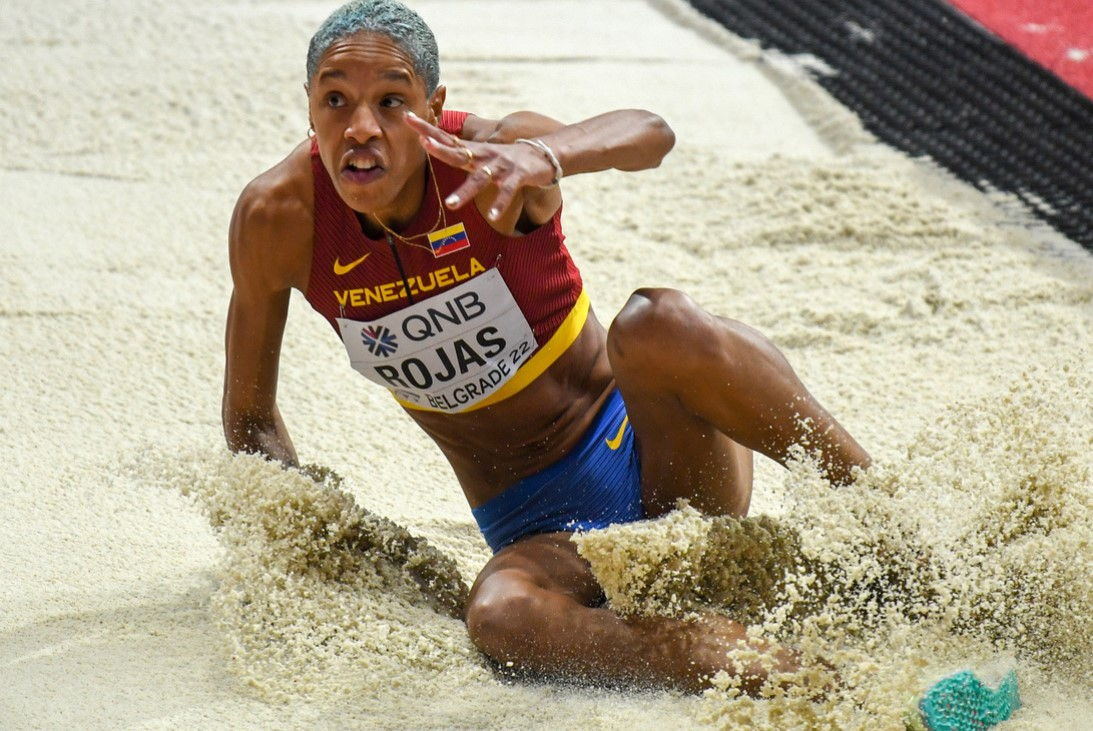
Rojas landing the world record triple jump in Belgrade on 20 March 2022

Rojas started her 2022 season in the long jump, wanting to "make an impact in this event", achieving a new indoor personal best and national record of 6.81 m (22 ft 4 in) in February. On 2 March, she competed in the triple jump at the World Indoor Athletics Final in Madrid, where she landed a world-lead jump and the second-furthest female indoor triple jump (just short of her own record). On 20 March, she then beat this record with an absolute best female triple jump, landing 15.74 m (51 ft 7 1/2 in) at the 2022 World Athletics Indoor Championships in Belgrade, Serbia, exactly one metre ahead of the silver medalist, Ukrainian long jump specialist Maryna Bekh-Romanchuk. After the win, she told Cathal Dennehy for World Athletics that her goal is to jump over 16 metres, saying it is what she was born to do.

In the 2022 outdoor athletics season, Rojas did not compete until the events held in Spain. On 8 June in Guadalajara, she beat her own long jump record, achieving 6.93 m (22 ft 8 3/4 in) and qualifying for the 2022 World Athletics Championships in Eugene in July; she could not contest the long jump at the World Championships despite this, due to wearing triple jump shoes during qualifying and an injury not giving her the opportunity to later qualify at another event. She successfully defended her triple jump title in Eugene with a 15.47 m (50 ft 9 in) jump, just short of the championship record.

=== 2023–present: Continued triple jump dominance and injury ===
At the 2023 World Championships in Budapest, Hungary, Rojas jumped 15.08 metres on her final attempt to overtake Ukraine's Maryna Bekh-Romanchuk and claim her fourth world title. Rojas underwent surgery after suffering an Achilles injury during a training session in Spain in April 2024 and announced she would miss the Paris Olympics as a result.

== Personal bests ==
- 100 m – 11.94 s (2013)
- 4 × 100 m – 46.70 s (2013)
- High jump – 1.87 m (6 ft 1 1/2 in) (2014)
- Long jump – 6.88 m (22 ft 6 3/4 in) (2021) (Note: In jumps at the 2021 Spanish Athletics Club Championships in La Nucia, Alicante, she achieved 7.27 m (23 ft 10 in) w (+2.7 m/s) and 7.06 m (23 ft 1 3/4 in) w (+2.9 m/s), which are not counted due to wind assistance. In a jump at the 2022 Reunion de Atletismo Ciudad de Guadalajara in Guadalajara, Castilla–La Mancha, she achieved 6.93 m (22 ft 8 3/4 in) w (+0.4 m/s) but was wearing non-approved shoes and the jump was disqualified.) NR

- Indoor long jump – 6.81 m (22 ft 4 in) (2022) NR

- Triple jump – 15.67 m (51 ft 4 3/4 in) (2021) WR, OR

- Indoor triple jump – 15.74 m (51 ft 7 1/2 in) (2022) WR

== Records held ==
- World Athletics Indoor Championships record in women's triple jump – indoor (since 2022)
- Diamond League record in women's triple jump (since 2021)
- World record in women's triple jump (since 2021)
- Olympic record in women's triple jump (since 2021)
- World record in women's triple jump – indoor (since 2020)
- Venezuelan record in women's long jump – indoor (since 2020)
- Pan American record in women's triple jump (since 2019)
- South American record in women's triple jump (since 2019)
- South American record in women's triple jump – indoor (since 2016)
- Venezuelan record in women's triple jump – indoor (since 2016)
- Venezuelan record in women's long jump (since 2015)
- Venezuelan record in women's triple jump (since 2014)
- Venezuelan under-20 record in women's long jump (since 2014)
- South American Under-23 Championship record in women's long jump (2014–2018)
- South American junior record in female high jump (2013–2018)

== Personal life ==
Rojas is openly lesbian, and she is an LGBT+ activist in her home country. She often dyes her cropped hair in bright colours; she chose pale pink for the 2020 Olympics, saying it reflected hope and strength.

She has thanked late Venezuelan president Hugo Chávez for promoting fitness in Venezuela, which allowed impoverished citizens like herself to get into sports. After similarly praising Nicolás Maduro in a phone call following her success at the Tokyo 2020 Olympics, Rojas faced criticism by anti-Maduro activists in Venezuela.

In April 2022, she became the face of the Banco de Venezuela.

== International competitions ==
Year	Competition	Venue	Position	Event	Result
2011	South American Junior Championships	Medellín, Colombia	1st	High jump	1.78 m
2012	Ibero-American Championships	Barquisimeto, Venezuela	6th	High jump	1.75 m
2012	South American U23 Championships	São Paulo, Brazil	3rd	High jump	1.73 m
2012	South American Youth Championships	Mendoza, Argentina	4th	High jump	1.68 m
2013	Pan American Junior Championships	Lima, Peru	2nd	High jump	1.76 m
2013	Bolivarian Games	Trujillo, Peru	2nd	High jump	1.76 m
2013	Bolivarian Games	Trujillo, Peru	6th	Long jump	5.87 m
2014	South American Games	Santiago, Chile	1st	High jump	1.79 m
2014	World Junior Championships	Eugene, United States	11th	Long jump	5.81 m
2014	World Junior Championships	Eugene, United States	17th	Triple jump	12.99 m
2014	Pan American Sports Festival	Mexico City, Mexico	1st	Long jump	6.53 m w
2014	South American U23 Championships	Montevideo, Uruguay	1st	Long jump	6.36 m CR
2014	South American U23 Championships	Montevideo, Uruguay	1st	Triple jump	13.35 m
2014	Central American and Caribbean Games	Veracruz, Mexico	4th	Long jump	6.24 m
2014	Central American and Caribbean Games	Veracruz, Mexico	4th	Triple jump	13.54 m
2015	South American Championships	Lima, Peru	4th	Long jump	6.20 m w (+2.4 m/s)
2015	South American Championships	Lima, Peru	1st	Triple jump	14.14 m w (+2.8 m/s)
2016	World Indoor Championships	Portland, United States	1st	Triple jump	14.41 m
2016	Olympic Games	Rio de Janeiro, Brazil	2nd	Triple jump	14.98 m
2017	South American Championships	Asunción, Paraguay	2nd	Triple jump	14.36 m
2017	World Championships	London, United Kingdom	1st	Triple jump	14.91 m
2018	World Indoor Championships	Birmingham, United Kingdom	1st	Triple jump	14.63 m
2019	Pan American Games	Lima, Peru	1st	Triple jump	15.11 m
2019	World Championships	Doha, Qatar	1st	Triple jump	15.37 m
2021	Olympic Games	Tokyo, Japan	1st	Triple jump	15.67 m OR, WR
2022	World Indoor Championships	Belgrade, Serbia	1st	Triple jump	15.74 m CR, WR
2022	World Championships	Eugene, United States	1st	Triple jump	15.47 m
2023	Central American and Caribbean Games	San Salvador, El Salvador	1st	Triple jump	15.16 m
2023	World Championships	Budapest, Hungary	1st	Triple jump	15.08 m
2025	World Championships	Tokyo, Japan	3rd	Triple jump	14.76 m SB
2026	World Indoor Championships	Toruń, Poland	2nd	Triple jump	14.86 m

== Honours and awards ==
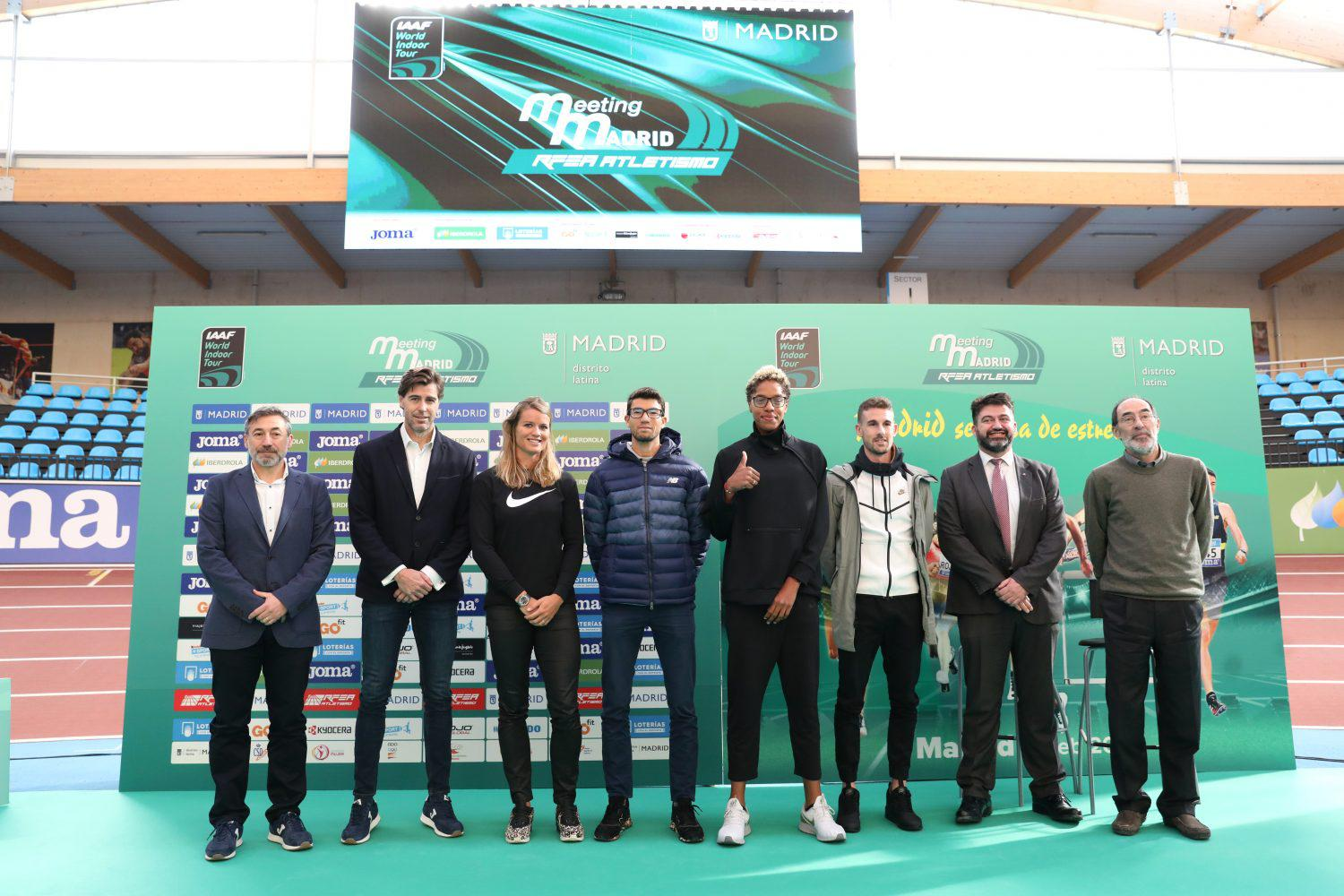
At the 2019 Madrid Indoor Athletics Meeting, Rojas (center) and other athletes spoke at a conference of the "greatest athletes in the world".

Prior to the 2016 Olympics, due to her World Indoor Championships (Portland) win, Rojas was awarded the Venezuelan honor Order José Félix Ribas – First Class (named for Venezuelan independence leader José Félix Ribas). This was conferred to her by Nicolás Maduro at Miraflores Palace on 23 March 2016, with the award ceremony shown in a 54-minute obligatory transmission in Venezuela.

There is a mural of Rojas, depicted jumping over Angel Falls, in Caracas; another mural, of Rojas and footballer Alexander Rondón, is at the Simón Bolívar Sports Complex, where she began training. In 2017, the Complejo deportivo Yulimar Rojas (Yulimar Rojas Sports Complex) in Barcelona, Venezuela, was named in her honor. In May 2022, the government of the state of Aragua announced that it had partnered with local eco-sports product company Blackforce to build an Olympic-standard triple jump arena in Rojas's honor.

In 2017 and 2019 she was named Latin American Sportswoman of the Year from the annual vote hosted by Prensa Latina. In 2017 she was also nominated for Univision's Female Athlete of the Year, which was won by Paola Longoria, and in 2019 was nominated for the Panam Female Athlete of the Year award, which went to Shelly-Ann Fraser-Pryce. Rojas was named the 2017 World Athletics Rising Star (Female), and was a finalist for the 2019 World Athlete of the Year (Female) honour. She then won this in 2020, being the first Venezuelan to receive the honour, and said that it "gives [her] a lot of motivation, a lot of strength for [her] to keep on track with [her] career."

In 2020 she was also named the LGBTQ Female Athlete of the Year by Outsports, and Female Most Valuable Performer in Athletics by Track & Field News. She was nominated for the 2022 Laureus World Sports Award for Breakthrough of the Year, which was won by British tennis player Emma Raducanu. She was chosen as one of the BBC's 100 women for 2022.

== Notes ==
Records
Preceded by (Russia) Tatyana Lebedeva	Women's Triple Jump Indoor World Record Holder; 21 February 2020 – present	Incumbent
Preceded by (Ukraine) Inessa Kravets	Women's Triple Jump World Record Holder; 1 August 2021 – present	Incumbent
Awards
Preceded by (United States) Dalilah Muhammad	Women's Track & Field Most Valuable Performer; 2020	Incumbent
Olympic Games
Preceded by Rubén Limardo	Flagbearer for Venezuela (with Antonio Díaz); Tokyo 2020	Succeeded by Incumbent
