= Athletics at the 2015 Pan American Games – Qualification =

== Qualification system ==
A total of 680 athletes will qualify to compete at the games. A nation may enter a maximum of two athletes per event, granted they meet the qualification standard. Qualification times and standards can be set from January 1, 2014, to June 28, 2015. The winner of each event contested at the 2014 Pan American Sports Festival will also qualify. Furthermore, a total of sixteen relay teams per each event will also qualify.

== Qualification times/standards ==
Men's events		Women's events	
Event	Standard	Event	Standard
Men's 100 metres	10.38	Women's 100 metres	11.55
Men's 200 metres	21.00	Women's 200 metres	23.64
Men's 400 metres	46.07	Women's 400 metres	52.94
Men's 800 metres	1:50.00	Women's 800 metres	2:06.00
Men's 1500 metres	3:49.00	Women's 1500 metres	4:26.00
Men's 5000 metres	14:23.00	Women's 5000 metres	16:43.00
Men's 10,000 metres	30:10.00	Women's 10,000 metres	35:51.00
Men's marathon	2:21:00	Women's marathon	2:55:00
Men's 3000 steeplechase	9:00.00	Women's 3000 steeplechase	10:46.00
Men's 110 metres hurdles	14.08	Women's 100 metres hurdles	13.77
Men's 400 metres hurdles	51.62	Women's 400 metres hurdles	59.56
Men's high jump	2.17	Women's high jump	1.78
Men's pole vault	4.98	Women's pole vault	3.68
Men's long jump	7.61	Women's long jump	6.18
Men's triple jump	16.17	Women's triple jump	13.08
Men's shot put	18.14	Women's shot put	15.82
Men's discus throw	53.05	Women's discus throw	50.94
Men's hammer throw	63.15	Women's hammer throw	61.85
Men's javelin throw	71.03	Women's javelin throw	51.07
Men's decathlon	7063	Women's heptathlon	4995
Men's 20 kilometres walk	1:30:00	Women's 20 kilometres walk	1:42:00
Men's 50 kilometres walk	4:18:00	—N/a	
Men's 4 × 100 metres relay	16 teams	Women's 4 × 100 metres relay	16 teams
Men's 4 × 400 metres relay	16 teams	Women's 4 × 400 metres relay	16 teams

== Pan American Sports Festival qualifiers ==
The following athletes qualified by winning the respective event at the 2014 Pan American Sports Festival in Mexico City, Mexico:

Men's events		Women's events	
Event	Qualified athlete	Event	Qualified athlete
Men's 100 metres	Jason Rogers (SKN)	Women's 100 metres	Ángela Tenorio (ECU)
Men's 200 metres	Sheldon Mitchell (JAM)	Women's 200 metres	Ángela Tenorio (ECU)
Men's 400 metres	Luguelín Santos (DOM)	Women's 400 metres	Anastasia Le-Roy (JAM)
Men's 800 metres	Andy González (CUB)	Women's 800 metres	Rose Mary Almanza (CUB)
Men's 1500 metres	Marvin Blanco (VEN)	Women's 1500 metres	Cristina Guevara (MEX)
Men's 5000 metres	Juan Luis Barrios (MEX)	Women's 5000 metres	Brenda Flores (MEX)
Men's 3000 steeplechase	Marvin Blanco (VEN)	Women's 3000 steeplechase	Zulema Arenas (PER)
Men's 110 metres hurdles	Ryan Brathwaite (BAR)	Women's 100 metres hurdles	Yvette Lewis (PAN)
Men's 400 metres hurdles	Jeffery Gibson (BAH)	Women's 400 metres hurdles	Zudikey Rodríguez (MEX)
Men's high jump	Nick Ross (MEX)	Women's high jump	Levern Spencer (LCA)
Men's pole vault	Germán Chiaraviglio (ARG)	Women's pole vault	Valeria Chiaraviglio (ARG)
Men's long jump	David Registe (DMA)	Women's long jump	Yulimar Rojas (VEN)
Men's triple jump	Yordanis Durañona (DMA)	Women's triple jump	Mabel Gay (CUB)
Men's shot put	Jordan Clarke (USA)	Women's shot put	Yaniuvis López (CUB)
Men's discus throw	Jorge Fernández (CUB)	Women's discus throw	Denia Caballero (CUB)
Men's hammer throw	Roberto Janet (CUB)	Women's hammer throw	Gwen Berry (USA)
Men's javelin throw	Júlio César de Oliveira (BRA)	Women's javelin throw	Jucilene de Lima (BRA)

== Relay qualification ==
The host nation Canada, along with the United States qualified in each event automatically. The top four teams at the 2014 Central American and Caribbean Games in Veracruz, Mexico along with the top four teams at the 2014 South American Games in Santiago, Chile qualified as well. All other remaining spots were awarded using the ranking lists after the 2015 IAAF World Relays.

=== Summary ===
Nation	Men		Women		Total
Nation	4X100	4X400	4X100	4X400	Relay teams
Antigua and Barbuda	X				1
Bahamas	X	X	X	X	4
Barbados	X			X	2
Brazil	X	X	X	X	4
British Virgin Islands			X	X	2
Canada	X	X	X	X	4
Cayman Islands	X				1
Chile	X	X	X	X	4
Colombia	X	X	X	X	4
Costa Rica		X			1
Cuba	X	X	X	X	4
Dominican Republic	X	X	X	X	4
Ecuador			X		1
Guyana	X			X	2
Jamaica	X	X	X		3
Mexico		X	X	X	3
Puerto Rico		X	X		2
Saint Lucia		X			1
Saint Kitts and Nevis	X		X		2
Trinidad and Tobago	X	X	X	X	4
United States	X	X	X	X	4
Venezuela	X	X	X	X	4
Total: 22 NOCs	16	16	16	16	64

=== 4x100 Men ===
Event	Vacancies	Qualified
Host nation	1	Canada
Qualified automatically	1	United States
2014 Central American and Caribbean Games	4	Cuba; Dominican Republic; Venezuela; Saint Kitts and Nevis
2014 South American Games	3*	Brazil; Colombia; Chile
7 Best ranked NOC's as of May 3, 2015	7	Antigua and Barbuda; Bahamas; Barbados; Cayman Islands; Guyana; Jamaica; Trinidad and Tobago
TOTAL	16	

- Venezuela placed in the top four at the 2014 South American Games, and thus only 3 nations qualified through the event. This means 7 nations (instead of 6) will qualify through the rankings.

=== 4x400 Men ===
Event	Vacancies	Qualified
Host nation	1	Canada
Qualified automatically	1	United States
2014 Central American and Caribbean Games	4	Cuba; Venezuela; Colombia; Dominican Republic
2014 South American Games	2*	Brazil; Chile
8 Best ranked NOC's as of May 3, 2015	8	Bahamas; Costa Rica; Jamaica; Mexico; Puerto Rico; Saint Lucia; Trinidad and Tobago; TBD
TOTAL	16	

- Venezuela and Colombia placed in the top four at the 2014 South American Games, and thus only 2 nations qualified through the event. This means 8 nations (instead of 6) will qualify through the rankings.

=== 4x100 Women ===
Event	Vacancies	Qualified
Host nation	1	Canada
Qualified automatically	1	United States
2014 Central American and Caribbean Games	4	Venezuela; Colombia; Cuba; Puerto Rico
2014 South American Games	2*	Chile; Ecuador
8 Best ranked NOC's as of May 3, 2015	8	Bahamas; Brazil; British Virgin Islands; Dominican Republic; Jamaica; Mexico; Saint Kitts and Nevis; Trinidad and Tobago
TOTAL	16	

- Venezuela and Colombia placed in the top four at the 2014 South American Games, and thus only 2 nations qualified through the event. This means 8 nations (instead of 6) will qualify through the rankings.

=== 4x400 Women ===
Event	Vacancies	Qualified
Host nation	1	Canada
Qualified automatically	1	United States
2014 Central American and Caribbean Games	4	Cuba; Mexico; Colombia; Venezuela
2014 South American Games	2*	Brazil; Chile
8 Best ranked NOC's as of May 3, 2015	8	Bahamas; Barbados; British Virgin Islands; Dominican Republic; Guyana; Jamaica; Trinidad and Tobago; TBD
TOTAL	16	

- Venezuela and Colombia placed in the top four at the 2014 South American Games, and thus only 2 nations qualified through the event. This means 8 nations (instead of 6) will qualify through the rankings.
