= 2011 Pan American Games medal table =

- Location: Guadalajara, Mexico

Highlights
- Most gold medals: United States (92)
- Most total medals: United States (237)

The 2011 Pan American Games medal table is a list of National Olympic Committees (NOCs) ranked by the number of gold medals won by their athletes during the 2011 Pan American Games, held in Guadalajara, capital of the Mexican state of Jalisco, from October 14 to October 30, 2011. Approximately 6,000 athletes from 41 NOCs participated in 361 events in 36 sports.

The Cayman Islands won its first ever gold medal, while the Saint Kitts and Nevis won its first ever Pan American Games medal.

== Medal table ==
The ranking in this table is based on information provided by the Pan American Sports Organization (PASO) and is consistent with PASO convention in its published medal tables. By default, the table is ordered by the number of gold medals the athletes from a nation have won (in this context, a "nation" is an entity represented by a National Olympic Committee). The number of silver medals is taken into consideration next and then the number of bronze medals. If nations are still tied, equal ranking is given and they are listed alphabetically by IOC country code.

In badminton, boxing, judo, karate, racquetball, taekwondo, table tennis, and wrestling two bronze medals will be awarded for each event. Also in bowling, fencing and squash two bronze medals will be awarded in some events. Therefore, the total number of bronze medals will be greater than the total number of gold or silver medals.

* Host nation (Mexico)

Rank	NOC	Gold	Silver	Bronze	Total
1	United States	92	79	66	237
2	Cuba	58	35	43	136
3	Brazil	48	35	58	141
4	Mexico*	42	41	50	133
5	Canada	30	40	49	119
6	Colombia	24	25	35	84
7	Argentina	21	19	34	74
8	Venezuela	11	27	33	71
9	Dominican Republic	7	9	17	33
10	Ecuador	7	8	9	24
11	Guatemala	7	3	5	15
12	Puerto Rico	6	8	8	22
13	Chile	3	16	24	43
14	Jamaica	1	5	1	7
15	Bahamas	1	1	1	3
15	Cayman Islands^{[a]}	1	1	1	3
17	Netherlands Antilles (PASO)	1	0	1	2
18	Costa Rica	1	0	0	1
19	Uruguay	0	3	2	5
20	Peru	0	2	5	7
21	Trinidad and Tobago	0	2	2	4
22	Saint Kitts and Nevis^{[b]}	0	2	0	2
23	El Salvador	0	1	1	2
24	Dominica	0	1	0	1
25	Barbados	0	0	2	2
25	Bolivia	0	0	2	2
25	Paraguay	0	0	2	2
28	Guyana	0	0	1	1
28	Panama	0	0	1	1
Totals (29 entries)		361	363	453	1,177

- ^[a] First ever gold medal
- ^[b] First ever medal

=== NOCs without medals ===
- Antigua and Barbuda
- Aruba
- Bermuda
- Belize
- Grenada
- Haiti
- Honduras
- British Virgin Islands
- Virgin Islands
- Saint Lucia
- Suriname
- Saint Vincent and the Grenadines

== Changes in medal standings ==
List of changes in medal standings
Ruling date	Sport	Event	Nation	Gold	Silver	Bronze	Total
October 28, 2011	Water skiing	Men's wakeboard	Canada		▼1		▼1
October 28, 2011	Water skiing	Men's wakeboard	Brazil		▲1	▼1	Steady
October 28, 2011	Water skiing	Men's wakeboard	Argentina			▲1	▲1
November 9, 2011	Athletics	Men's long jump	Venezuela	▼1			▼1
November 9, 2011	Athletics	Men's long jump	Chile	▲1	▼1		Steady
November 9, 2011	Athletics	Men's long jump	Dominica		▲1	▼1	Steady
November 9, 2011	Athletics	Men's long jump	United States			▲1	▲1
January 6, 2012	Wrestling	Men's Freestyle 60 kg	Argentina			▼1	▼1
January 6, 2012	Wrestling	Men's Freestyle 60 kg	El Salvador			▲1	▲1

On October 28, 2011, the Pan American Sports Organization announced that Canadian wakeboarder Aaron Rathy had tested positive for the banned substance methylhexaneamine and was stripped of his silver medal he won in the men's wakeboard event. After Rathy was disqualified, the silver medal went to Marcelo Giardi of Brazil, and the bronze medal to Alejo de Palma of Argentina.

On November 9, 2011, the Venezuelan Athletic Federation announced that Venezuelan athlete Víctor Castillo had tested positive for the banned substance methylhexaneamine and was stripped of his gold medal he won in the men's long jump event. After Castillo was disqualified, the gold medal went to Daniel Pineda of Chile, the silver medal went to David Registe of Dominica, and the bronze medal to Jeremy Hicks of United States.

On January 6, 2012, the Pan American Sports Organization announced that Argentinian wrestling Fernando Iglesias had tested positive for the banned substances Clenbuterol and Furosemide and was stripped of his bronze medal he won in the Men's Freestyle 60 kg event. After Iglesias was disqualified, the bronze medal went to Luis Portillo of El Salvador.

== See also ==
- All-time Pan American Games medal table
