= Beach volleyball at the 2019 Pan American Games – Qualification =

The following is the qualification system and qualified athletes for the beach volleyball at the 2019 Pan American Games competitions.

== Qualification system ==
A total of 64 Beach volleyball athletes will qualify to compete. Each nation may enter a maximum of 4 athletes (one team per gender of two athletes). As host nation, Peru automatically qualified a full team of four athletes (one team per gender). All other quotas were awarded through the NORCECA (North America, Central America and Caribbean) and CSV (South America) rankings. The top 10 teams from NORCECA qualified along with the top five teams from CSV.

== Qualification summary ==
NOC	Men	Women	Athletes
Argentina	X	X	4
Brazil	X	X	4
Canada	X	X	4
Chile	X	X	4
Colombia		X	2
Costa Rica	X	X	4
Cuba	X	X	4
Dominican Republic	X		2
El Salvador	X	X	4
Guatemala	X	X	4
Mexico	X	X	4
Nicaragua	X	X	4
Paraguay		X	2
Peru	X	X	4
Trinidad and Tobago	X	X	4
United States	X	X	4
Uruguay	X		2
Venezuela	X		2
Virgin Islands		X	2
Total: 19 NOC's	16	16	64

== Men ==
North, Central America and the Caribbean

Rank	NOC	Total
1	United States	4820
2	Canada	4400
3	Cuba	2780
4	Guatemala	2515
5	Trinidad and Tobago	2285
6	Mexico	2240
7	Nicaragua	1475
8	Costa Rica	1475
9	El Salvador	1450
10	Dominican Republic	1295
11	Virgin Islands	1115
12	Puerto Rico	1075
13	Saint Kitts and Nevis	790
14	Jamaica	495
15	Honduras	410
16	Saint Lucia	335
17	Cayman Islands	330
18	Barbados	185
19	Dominica	155
20	Aruba	150
21	Suriname	115
22	Antigua and Barbuda	80
23	Grenada	70
23	Belize	70
25	Bahamas	56
26	Haiti	45
26	Saint Vincent and the Grenadines	45

South America

Rank	NOC	Total
1	Brazil	3400
2	Chile	3040
3	Argentina	3020
4	Venezuela	2480
5	Uruguay	2465
6	Colombia	1905
7	Paraguay	1725
8	Ecuador	1425
9	Peru	1120
10	Bolivia	200

- Peru as host nation qualified automatically

== Women ==
North, Central America and the Caribbean

Rank	NOC	Total
1	United States	5140
2	Canada	4470
3	Mexico	3040
4	Cuba	2680
5	Costa Rica	2250
6	Guatemala	1715
7	Nicaragua	1550
8	Virgin Islands	1460
9	Trinidad and Tobago	1320
10	El Salvador	1250
11	Puerto Rico	885
12	Jamaica	805
13	Dominican Republic	600
14	Cayman Islands	580
15	Honduras	450
16	Saint Kitts and Nevis	350
17	Antigua and Barbuda	270
18	Saint Lucia	240
19	Grenada	160
20	Dominica	145
21	Suriname	45
22	Belize	25
23	Grenada	70
23	Belize	70

South America

Rank	NOC	Total
1	Brazil	3700
2	Argentina	2880
3	Colombia	2580
4	Paraguay	2570
5	Chile	2205
6	Uruguay	2175
7	Ecuador	1625
8	Venezuela	1555
9	Peru	1530
10	Bolivia	100

- Peru as host nation qualified automatically
