= Boxing at the 2023 Pan American Games – Qualification =

The following is the qualification system and qualified athletes for the boxing at the 2023 Pan American Games competitions.

== Qualification system ==
A total of 130 boxers will qualify to compete at the games (ten per event). The host nation (Chile) received automatic qualification spots. The remainder of the spots were awarded through various qualifying tournaments. However, the International Olympic Committee’s Paris Boxing Unit later decided the competition was an open registration event, meaning any NOC could enter a boxer into the event.

== Qualification timeline ==
Event	Date	Venue
2021 Junior Pan American Games	November 29 – December 4, 2021	(Colombia) Cali
2022 South American Games	October 1–15, 2022	(Paraguay) Asunción
2023 Central American and Caribbean Games	June 23 – July 8, 2023	(El Salvador) San Salvador
2023 Pan American Qualifier	July 31 – August 8, 2023	(Colombia) Cali

== Qualification summary ==
The following is a summary of qualified countries per event.

NOC	Men							Women						Total
NOC	51 kg	57 kg	63.5 kg	71 kg	80 kg	92 kg	+92 kg	50 kg	54 kg	57 kg	60 kg	66 kg	75 kg	Total
Antigua and Barbuda			X			X								2
Argentina	X		X	X	X		X	X	X	X	X	X	X	11
Barbados	X				X								X	3
Brazil	X	X	X	X	X	X	X	X	X	X	X	X	X	13
Canada	X	X	X	X	X	X	X	X	X	X	X	X	X	13
Chile	X			X	X	X	X	X	X	X				8
Colombia	X	X	X	X	X	X	X	X	X	X	X	X	X	13
Costa Rica								X	X		X	X		4
Cuba	X	X	X	X	X	X	X			X		X	X	10
Dominica			X				X							2
Dominican Republic	X	X	X	X	X	X		X	X	X	X	X	X	12
Ecuador	X	X		X	X	X	X	X	X		X		X	10
El Salvador			X											1
Grenada			X		X									2
Guatemala	X	X			X			X		X				5
Guyana		X	X		X	X						X		5
Haiti			X	X	X			X	X					5
Jamaica			X		X									2
Mexico	X	X	X	X		X	X	X	X	X	X		X	11
Panama		X	X	X				X					X	5
Paraguay							X			X				2
Peru			X							X				2
Puerto Rico		X		X	X			X		X		X		7
Trinidad and Tobago	X			X			X				X		X	5
United States	X	X	X	X	X	X	X	X	X	X	X	X	X	13
Uruguay		X									X			2
Venezuela	X	X	X	X	X			X	X	X	X	X	X	11
Total: 27 NOCs	14	14	18	15	17	11	11	15	12	14	12	11	13	177

== Men ==
=== 51 kg ===
Competition	Vacancies	Qualified
Host nation	1	Chile
2021 Junior Pan American Games	1	Cuba
2022 South American Games	2	Ecuador; Colombia
2023 Central American and Caribbean Games	2	Dominican Republic; Barbados
2023 Pan American Qualifier	4	Venezuela; Guatemala; Trinidad and Tobago; Canada
Open entry	4	Argentina; Brazil; Mexico; United States
TOTAL	14	

=== 57 kg ===
Competition	Vacancies	Qualified
Host nation	~~1~~ 0	~~Chile~~
2021 Junior Pan American Games	1	United States
2022 South American Games	2	Brazil; Ecuador
2023 Central American and Caribbean Games	2	Colombia; Venezuela
2023 Pan American Qualifier	4	Puerto Rico; Uruguay; Dominican Republic; Guyana
Open entry	5	Canada; Cuba; Guatemala; Mexico; Panama
TOTAL	14	

=== 63.5 kg ===
Competition	Vacancies	Qualified
Host nation	~~1~~ 0	~~Chile~~
2021 Junior Pan American Games	1	Colombia
2022 South American Games	~~2~~ 1	~~Uruguay~~; Peru
2023 Central American and Caribbean Games	2	Dominican Republic; Cuba
2023 Pan American Qualifier	~~4~~ 3	Venezuela; Canada; Mexico; ~~Virgin Islands~~
Open entry	11	Antigua and Barbuda; Argentina; Brazil; Dominica; El Salvador; Grenada; Guyana; Haiti; Jamaica; Panama; United States
TOTAL	18	

=== 71 kg ===
Competition	Vacancies	Qualified
Host nation	1	Chile
2021 Junior Pan American Games	1	United States
2022 South American Games	2	Brazil; Colombia
2023 Central American and Caribbean Games	2	Mexico; Cuba
2023 Pan American Qualifier	4	Puerto Rico; Canada; Trinidad and Tobago; Haiti
Open entry	5	Argentina; Dominican Republic; Ecuador; Panama; Venezuela
TOTAL	15	

=== 80 kg ===
Competition	Vacancies	Qualified
Host nation	1	Chile
2021 Junior Pan American Games	1	Cuba
2022 South American Games	2	Brazil; Argentina
2023 Central American and Caribbean Games	2	Dominican Republic; Colombia
2023 Pan American Qualifier	4	Canada; Guyana; Guatemala; Ecuador
Open entry	7	Barbados; Grenada; Haiti; Jamaica; Puerto Rico; United States; Venezuela
TOTAL	17	

=== 92 kg ===
Competition	Vacancies	Qualified
Host nation	1	Chile
2021 Junior Pan American Games	1	Cuba
2022 South American Games	2	Ecuador; Brazil
2023 Central American and Caribbean Games	2	Colombia; Dominican Republic
2023 Pan American Qualifier	~~4~~ 2	Mexico; Canada; ~~Venezuela~~
Open entry	3	Antigua and Barbuda; Guyana; United States
TOTAL	11	

- Only 3 athletes competed at the final qualifier.

=== +92 kg ===
Competition	Vacancies	Qualified
Host nation	1	Chile
2021 Junior Pan American Games	1	Colombia
2022 South American Games	2	Brazil; Ecuador
2023 Central American and Caribbean Games	2	Cuba; Trinidad and Tobago
2023 Pan American Qualifier	~~4~~ 3	Canada; Mexico; ~~Venezuela~~; Paraguay
Open entry	2	Argentina; Dominica; United States
TOTAL	11	

== Women ==
=== 50 kg ===
Competition	Vacancies	Qualified
Host nation	1	Chile
2021 Junior Pan American Games	1	United States
2022 South American Games	2	Colombia; Brazil
2023 Central American and Caribbean Games	2	Guatemala; Costa Rica
2023 Pan American Qualifier	4	Mexico; Ecuador; Canada; Puerto Rico
Open entry	5	Argentina; Dominican Republic; Haiti; Panama; Venezuela
TOTAL	15	

=== 54 kg ===
Competition	Vacancies	Qualified
Host nation	1	Chile
2021 Junior Pan American Games	1	Colombia
2022 South American Games	2	Brazil; Venezuela
2023 Central American and Caribbean Games	2	Dominican Republic; Mexico
2023 Pan American Qualifier	~~4~~ 3	Canada; Ecuador; Costa Rica
Open entry	2	Argentina; United States
TOTAL	11	

- Only 3 athletes competed at the final qualifier.

=== 57 kg ===
Competition	Vacancies	Qualified
Host nation	1	Chile
2021 Junior Pan American Games	1	United States
2022 South American Games	2	Brazil; Colombia
2023 Central American and Caribbean Games	2	Puerto Rico; Cuba
2023 Pan American Qualifier	4	Venezuela; Canada; Paraguay; Guatemala
Open entry	4	Argentina; Dominican Republic; Mexico; Peru
TOTAL	14	

=== 60 kg ===
Competition	Vacancies	Qualified
Host nation	~~1~~ 0	~~Chile~~
2021 Junior Pan American Games	1	Colombia
2022 South American Games	2	Uruguay; Venezuela
2023 Central American and Caribbean Games	2	Dominican Republic; Mexico
2023 Pan American Qualifier	4	Ecuador; Trinidad and Tobago; Costa Rica; Canada
Open entry	3	Argentina; Brazil; United States
TOTAL	12	

=== 66 kg ===
Competition	Vacancies	Qualified
Host nation	~~1~~ 0	~~Chile~~
2021 Junior Pan American Games	1	United States
2022 South American Games	2	Brazil; Argentina
2023 Central American and Caribbean Games	2	Puerto Rico; Dominican Republic
2023 Pan American Qualifier	4	Colombia; Canada; Venezuela; Costa Rica
Open entry	2	Cuba; Guyana
TOTAL	11	

=== 75 kg ===
Competition	Vacancies	Qualified
Host nation	~~1~~ 0	~~Chile~~
2021 Junior Pan American Games	1	Venezuela
2022 South American Games	2	Panama; Colombia
2023 Central American and Caribbean Games	2	Mexico; Cuba
2023 Pan American Qualifier	~~4~~ 3	Canada; Ecuador; Trinidad and Tobago
Open entry	5	Argentina; Barbados; Brazil; Dominican Republic; United States
TOTAL	13	

- Only 3 athletes competed at the final qualifier.
