= Athletics at the 2019 Pan American Games – Women's high jump =

Women's high jump at the 2019 Pan American Games
- Venue: Athletics Stadium
- Dates: August 8
- Competitors: 12 from 10 nations
- Winning height: 1.87

Medalists
Gold medal	Levern Spencer; Saint Lucia
Silver medal	Priscilla Frederick; Antigua and Barbuda
Bronze medal	Kimberly Williamson; Jamaica

The women's high jump competition of the athletics events at the 2019 Pan American Games took place on the 8th of August at the 2019 Pan American Games Athletics Stadium. The defending Pan American Games champion is Levern Spencer from Saint Lucia.

Spencer successfully defended her title. It became her third Pan Am Games medal in her fifth straight competition.

== Records ==
Prior to this competition, the existing world and Pan American Games records were as follows:

World record	Stefka Kostadinova (BUL)	2.09	Rome, Italy	August 30, 1987
Pan American Games record	Coleen Sommer (USA)	1.96	Indianapolis, United States	August 13, 1987

== Schedule ==
Date	Time	Round
August 8, 2019	15:20	Final

== Results ==
All distances shown are in meters.

KEY:	q	Fastest non-qualifiers	Q	Qualified	NR	National record	PB	Personal best	SB	Seasonal best	DQ	Disqualified

=== Final ===
The results were as follows:

Rank	Name	Nationality	1.74	1.79	1.84	1.87	1.90	Mark	Notes
1st place, gold medalist(s)	Levern Spencer	Saint Lucia	–	o	o	o	xxx	1.87	
2nd place, silver medalist(s)	Priscilla Frederick	Antigua and Barbuda	o	o	o	xo	xxx	1.87	SB
3rd place, bronze medalist(s)	Kimberly Williamson	Jamaica	o	o	o	xxx		1.84	
4	Jeanelle Scheper	Saint Lucia	o	xo	o	xxx		1.84	=SB
5	Valdiléia Martins	Brazil	o	xo	xo	xxx		1.84	
6	Candy Toche	Peru	o	o	xxx			1.79	
7	Karla Terán	Mexico	xxo	o	xxx			1.79	
8	Nicole Greene	United States	o	xo	xxx			1.79	
9	María Fernanda Murillo	Colombia	–	xxo	xxx			1.79	
10	Lorena Aires	Uruguay	o	xxx				1.74	
10	Morgan Smalls	United States	o	xxx				1.74	
12	Isis Guerra	Cuba	xo	xxx				1.74	
	Sashane Hanson	Jamaica						DNS	
