= Cycling at the 2015 Pan American Games – Qualification =

== Qualification summary ==
Although in theory an NOC is entitled to qualify up to one place per road and track event for a total of twenty-two quota places, a limit of 16 riders (10 men, 6 women) is placed on each NOC. For certain countries, therefore, the number of quota places won will significantly exceed the numbers of riders qualified.

Nation	Track										Road				MTB		BMX		Total			
Nation	Men					Women					Men		Women		M	W	M	W	Q	RM	RF	T
Nation	TS	SP	KE	TP	OM	TS	SP	KE	TP	OM	RR	TT	RR	TT	M	W	M	W	Q	RM	RF	T
Antigua and Barbuda											2								2	2		2
Argentina	X	1	1	X	1	X	1			1					2	2	2	2	16	13	7	20
Aruba																	1		1	1		1
Bermuda												1	1						2	1	1	2
Bolivia											1						2		2	2		2
Brazil	X	1	1	X	1	X	1	1	X	1	2		3	1	2	2	2	2	24	14	10	24
Canada	X	1	1	X	1	X	1	1	X	1	3	1	3	2	2	2	2	2	24	14	10	24
Chile				X	1				X	1	2	1			2	1	2	1	13	12	7	19
Colombia	X	2	1	X	1	X	2	1	X	1	3	2	2	1	2	2	2	2	28	14	10	24
Costa Rica									X	1			1		1	1			5	1	7	8
Cuba						X	1	1	X	1			2						7		6	6
Dominican Republic											2		1						3	2	1	3
Ecuador								1			3	1			2	2	2	2	13	7	5	12
El Salvador						1	1												2		2	2
Guatemala						X	1	1	X	1	2				1				8	3	6	9
Jamaica																	1		1	1		1
Mexico				X	1	X	1	1	X				2		2	2	2		15	9	8	17
Peru											2						2		4	4		4
Puerto Rico											2							1	3	2	1	3
Suriname		1																	1	1		1
Trinidad and Tobago	X		2								1								4	6		6
United States	X	1	1		1		1	1	X	1	2	1	2	2	2	2	2	2	23	8	9	17
Uruguay															2				2	2		2
Venezuela	X	2	1	X	1	X	1	1	X	1			1	1	1		2	1	17	13	7	20
Total: 24 NOCs	7	9	8	7	8	9	11	10	10	10	20	5	15	5	21	16	24	14	130	98		228

Legend

- TS — Team Sprint (one team per NOC)
- KE — Keirin
- SP — Sprint
- TP — Team Pursuit (one team per NOC)
- OM — Omnium
- RR — Road Race
- TT — Individual Time Trial
- Q — Quotas
- RM — Riders (male)
- RF — Riders (female)
- T — Total

== Qualification systems ==
A total of 228 cyclists can qualify to compete at the games (153 in road and track combined, 37 in mountain biking and 37 in BMX). A nation may enter at most 24 athletes (16 among road and track cycling, four in mountain biking and four in BMX). The host nation (Canada) will automatically enter a full team of 24 athletes (14 male and 10 female), which is included in the numbers below.

Event	Men	Women	Total
Road+Track	87	67	154
Mountain Biking	21	16	37
BMX	24	14	38
Total athletes	130	98	228

== Qualification timeline ==
Event	Date	Venue
BMX
UCI Individual Ranking	December 31, 2014	–
Mountain Bike
2014 South American Games	March 11–14, 2014	Santiago, Chile
2014 Pan American Continental Championship	March 27–30, 2014	Barbacena, Brazil
2014 Central American and Caribbean Games	November 15, 2014	Veracruz, Mexico
Road
2014 Pan American Continental Championship	May 8–11, 2014	Puebla, Mexico
2014 Caribbean Road Cycling Championships	October 25–26, 2014	Ponce, Puerto Rico
Track
2014 South American Games	March 15, 2014	Santiago, Chile
2014 Pan American Sports Festival	September 10–14, 2014	Aguascalientes, Mexico
2014 Central American and Caribbean Games	November 17–21, 2014	Veracruz, Mexico

== BMX ==
A maximum of 23 male and 15 female athletes will be allowed to compete. The host nation automatically receives two quota spots per event, and all other nations may qualify a maximum of two athletes per event. All qualification will be done using the UCI rankings as of December 31, 2014.

=== Men ===
Event	Vacancies	Qualified
Host nation	2	Canada; Canada
UCI World Rankings	~~21~~20	United States; United States; Brazil; Colombia; Colombia; Argentina; Argentina; Brazil; Ecuador; Ecuador; Chile; Bolivia; Chile; Venezuela; Venezuela; Peru; Bolivia; Mexico; Mexico; Peru
Total	22	

- Only 22 riders were ranked, so the quota was reduced by one.

=== Women ===
Event	Vacancies	Qualified
Host nation	2	Canada; Canada
UCI World Rankings	~~13~~ 12	Colombia; United States; Venezuela; United States; Brazil; Brazil; Argentina; Argentina; Ecuador; ~~Puerto Rico~~; Colombia; Chile; Ecuador
Total	~~15~~ 14	

== Mountain biking ==
A total of 21 male and 15 female mountain bikers (36 total) will qualify to compete at the games. A country may enter a maximum of two male and two female athletes.

=== Men ===
Event	Vacancies	Qualified
Host nation	2	Canada; Canada
South American Games	4	Brazil; Brazil; Argentina; Colombia
Pan American Championship	15	United States; Colombia; Argentina; Chile; Mexico; Mexico; Ecuador; Venezuela; United States; Chile; Guatemala; Ecuador; Uruguay; Uruguay
Central American and Caribbean Games	1	Costa Rica
Total	21	

=== Women ===
Event	Vacancies	Qualified
Host nation	2	Canada; Canada
South American Games	2	Argentina; Brazil
Pan American Championship	11	Mexico; United States; United States; Costa Rica; Colombia; Argentina; Brazil; Ecuador; Colombia; Chile; Ecuador
Central American and Caribbean Games	1	Mexico
Total	16	

== Road cycling ==
A maximum of 87 male and 67 female may be entered across all events in road and track. A nation may enter only a maximum of ten male and six female in road and track cycling combined, which opens the door to reallocation of unused quotas in both sports if countries qualify more than 16 athletes combined in both events. A maximum of two cyclists in each time trial event may be entered, while a maximum of four men and three women may contest the road races. An athlete qualifying in any road or track event, may contest any other event in either discipline respecting the maximum per event quota for a country.

=== Men's Road Race ===
Event	Vacancies	Qualified
Pan American Championship	13	Canada; Canada; Canada; Ecuador; ~~United States~~; Colombia; Colombia; Colombia; Ecuador; Chile; Brazil; ~~United States~~; Guatemala; Chile; Brazil; Guatemala
Caribbean Championship	6	Trinidad and Tobago; Puerto Rico; Dominican Republic; Puerto Rico; Dominican Republic; Antigua and Barbuda
Total	17	

=== Men's Individual Time Trial ===
Event	Vacancies	Qualified
Pan American Championship	5	Canada; Colombia; ~~United States~~; Chile; Colombia; Ecuador
Total	4	

=== Reallocation ===
Event	Vacancies	Qualified
Reallocation	4	Antigua and Barbuda; Bermuda; Peru; Peru
Total	4	

=== Women's Road Race ===
Event	Vacancies	Qualified
Pan American Championship	13	Canada; Canada; Canada; Cuba; United States; Colombia; Brazil; Brazil; Mexico; Cuba; Colombia; Mexico; Brazil; ~~Costa Rica~~; Venezuela; ~~United States~~
Caribbean Championship	2	Dominican Republic; Bermuda
Total	13	

=== Women's Individual Time Trial ===
Event	Vacancies	Qualified
Pan American Championship	5	Canada; Canada; United States; Colombia; United States; Brazil; Venezuela
Total	5	

=== Reallocation ===
Event	Vacancies	Qualified
Reallocation	2	TBD
Total	2	

== Track cycling ==
A nation may enter up to 16 athletes (ten male and six female). A maximum of two athletes in each gender may be entered in the individual sprint, one in the keirin and omnium, a team of two female (three male) athletes in team sprint and a four-member team pursuit (per gender). As noted above a nation may enter only a maximum of ten male and six female in road and track cycling combined, which opens the door to reallocation of unused quotas. An athlete qualifying in any road or track event, may contest any other event in either discipline respecting the maximum per event quota for a country. A maximum of 87 male and 67 female may be entered across all events in road and track.

=== Men's Team Sprint ===
Teams are of 3 riders

Event	Vacancies	Qualified
Host nation	1	Canada
Pan American Olympic Festival	5	Venezuela; Colombia; Brazil; Argentina; Trinidad and Tobago
Reallocation	1	United States
Total	7	

=== Men's Sprint ===
Event	Vacancies	Qualified
Host nation	1	Canada
South American Games	1	Colombia
Pan American Olympic Festival	4	Colombia; Venezuela; Brazil; United States
Central American and Caribbean Games	1	Venezuela
Reallocation	1	Argentina; Suriname
Total	9	

=== Men's Keirin ===
Event	Vacancies	Qualified
Host nation	1	Canada
South American Games	1	Colombia
Pan American Olympic Festival	4	Venezuela; United States; Argentina; Brazil
Central American and Caribbean Games	1	Trinidad and Tobago
Reallocation	1	Trinidad and Tobago
Total	8	

=== Men's Team Pursuit ===
Teams are of 4 riders

Event	Vacancies	Qualified
Host nation	1	Canada
Pan American Olympic Festival	5	Colombia; Argentina; Venezuela; Chile; Brazil
Reallocation	1	Mexico
Total	7	

=== Men's Omnium ===
Event	Vacancies	Qualified
Host nation	1	Canada
South American Games	1	Colombia
Pan American Olympic Festival	4	Chile; Brazil; Argentina; United States
Central American and Caribbean Games	1	Mexico
Reallocation	1	Venezuela
Total	8	

=== Women's Team Sprint ===
Teams are of 2 riders

Event	Vacancies	Qualified
Host nation	1	Canada
Pan American Olympic Festival	5	Colombia; Venezuela; Cuba; Mexico; United States
Reallocation	3	Argentina; Brazil; Guatemala
Total	9	

=== Women's Sprint ===
Event	Vacancies	Qualified
Host nation	1	Canada
South American Games	1	Venezuela
Pan American Olympic Festival	3	Cuba; Colombia; Colombia
Central American and Caribbean Games	1	El Salvador
Reallocation	5	Argentina; Brazil; Guatemala; Mexico; United States
Total	11	

=== Women's Keirin ===
Event	Vacancies	Qualified
Host nation	1	Canada
South American Games	1	Colombia
Pan American Olympic Festival	4	Brazil; Venezuela; Cuba; Mexico
Reallocation	4	Ecuador; El Salvador; Guatemala; United States
Total	10	

=== Women's Team Pursuit ===
Teams are of 4 riders

Event	Vacancies	Qualified
Host nation	1	Canada
Pan American Olympic Festival	5	United States; Cuba; Venezuela; Colombia; Chile
Reallocation	4	Brazil; Costa Rica; Guatemala; Mexico
Total	10	

=== Women's Omnium ===
Event	Vacancies	Qualified
Host nation	1	Canada
South American Games	~~1~~	–
Pan American Olympic Festival	3	Cuba; United States; Colombia
Central American and Caribbean Games	1	Costa Rica
Reallocation	5	Argentina; Brazil; Chile; Guatemala; Venezuela
Total	10	

- The women's omnium was not held at the South American Games
