= Daniel Pineda =

Daniel Pineda may refer to:

- Daniel Pineda (athlete) (born 1985), Chilean track and field athlete
- Daniel Pineda (fighter) (born 1985), American mixed martial artist
- Daniel Pineda (archer) (born 1993), Colombian archer
