= Dominica at the 2011 Pan American Games =

- IOC code: DMA
- NOC: Dominica Olympic Committee
- Website: www.doc.dm

in Guadalajara 14–30 October 2011
- Competitors: 5 in 2 sports
- Flag bearer: Erison Hurtault
- Medals Ranked 23rd: Gold 0 Silver 1 Bronze 0 Total 1

Pan American Games appearances (overview)
- 1995; 1999; 2003; 2007; 2011; 2015; 2019; 2023

Dominica competed at the 2011 Pan American Games in Guadalajara, Mexico from October 14 to 30, 2011. Dominica competed with five athletes in two sports: athletics and boxing.

== Medalists ==
Medal	Name	Sport	Event	Date
Silver	David Registe	Athletics	Men's long jump	October 25

== Athletics ==
=== Track and road events ===
Event	Athletes	Heats		Semifinal		Final	
Event	Athletes	Time	Rank	Time	Rank	Time	Rank
400 m	Erison Hurtault			46.24	4th	did not advance	

=== Field events ===
Event	Athletes	Semifinal		Final	
Event	Athletes	Result	Rank	Result	Rank
High jump	Brendan Williams			2.21 m. PB	5th
Long jump	David Registe	7.88 m.	1st Q	7.89 m.	2nd place, silver medalist(s)

=== Field events ===
Event	Athletes	Semifinal		Final	
Event	Athletes	Result	Rank	Result	Rank
Shot put	Vanessa Henry			14.04 m.	9th

== Boxing ==
Dominica has received a wildcard to send one male boxer.

Men

Athlete	Event	Preliminaries	Quarterfinals	Semifinals	Final
Athlete	Event	Opposition Result	Opposition Result	Opposition Result	Opposition Result
Rowain Christopher	Middleweight	Junio Castillo (DOM); L KO R1 3:00	did not advance		
