= Athletics at the 2019 Pan American Games – Men's long jump =

Men's long jump at the 2019 Pan American Games
- Venue: Athletics Stadium
- Dates: August 7
- Competitors: 13 from 11 nations
- Winning distance: 8.27

Medalists
Gold medal	Juan Miguel Echevarría	Cuba
Silver medal	Tajay Gayle	Jamaica
Bronze medal	Emiliano Lasa	Uruguay

The men's long jump competition of the athletics events at the 2019 Pan American Games took place on 7 August at the 2019 Pan American Games Athletics Stadium. The defending Pan American Games champion is Jeff Henderson from the United States.

== Records ==
Prior to this competition, the existing world and Pan American Games records were as follows:

World record	Mike Powell (USA)	8.95 m	Tokyo, Japan	August 30, 1991
Pan American Games record	Carl Lewis (USA)	8.75 m	Indianapolis, United States	August 16, 1987

== Schedule ==
Date	Time	Round
August 7, 2019	15:35	Final

== Results ==
All times shown are in meters.

KEY:	q	Fastest non-qualifiers	Q	Qualified	NR	National record	PB	Personal best	SB	Seasonal best	DQ	Disqualified

=== Final ===
The results were as follows:

Rank	Name	Nationality	#1	#2	#3	#4	#5	#6	Mark	Notes
1st place, gold medalist(s)	Juan Miguel Echevarría	Cuba	8.09	x	8.06	8.27	7.26	x	8.27	+0.3
2nd place, silver medalist(s)	Tajay Gayle	Jamaica	7.97	8.17	8.10	x	x	x	8.17	+0.3
3rd place, bronze medalist(s)	Emiliano Lasa	Uruguay	7.83	7.87	x	7.87	7.70	x	7.87	+1.2
4	Alexsandro Melo	Brazil	7.77	7.70	7.66	7.63	x	7.75	7.77	+0.6
5	Tyrone Smith	Bermuda	x	x	7.74	7.34	x	–	7.74	+1.2
6	Trumaine Jefferson	United States	x	7.66	–	–	–	–	7.66	+1.0
7	Andwuelle Wright	Trinidad and Tobago	x	7.62	7.51	7.55	7.61	x	7.62	+0.5
8	Adrian Riley	Jamaica	7.57	7.36	7.25	x	7.28	x	7.57	+0.8
9	José Luis Mandros	Peru	7.48	7.56	x				7.56	+0.5 SB
10	Quincy Breell	Aruba	x	7.17	7.33				7.33	-0.1
11	Emanuel Archibald	Guyana	7.21	7.19	7.22				7.22	+0.2
12	Maykel Massó	Cuba	x	7.07	7.21				7.21	-0.2
13	Daniel Pineda	Chile	x	6.80	7.05				7.05	+0.2
