= Athletics at the 2015 Pan American Games – Men's long jump =

Men's long jump at the 2015 Pan American Games
- Venue: CIBC Pan Am and Parapan Am Athletics Stadium
- Dates: July 21 - July 22
- Competitors: 18 from 15 nations
- Winning distance: 8.54

Medalists
Gold medal	Jeff Henderson	United States
Silver medal	Marquise Goodwin	United States
Bronze medal	Emiliano Lasa	Uruguay

The men's long jump competition of the athletics events at the 2015 Pan American Games will take place between the 21 and 22 of July at the CIBC Pan Am and Parapan Am Athletics Stadium. The defending Pan American Games champion is Daniel Pineda of Chile.

== Records ==
Prior to this competition, the existing world and Pan American Games records were as follows:

World record	Mike Powell (USA)	8.95	Tokyo, Japan	August 30, 1991
Pan American Games record	Carl Lewis (USA)	8.75	Indianapolis, United States	August 16, 1987

== Qualification ==
Each National Olympic Committee (NOC) was able to enter up to two entrants providing they had met the minimum standard (7.61) in the qualifying period (January 1, 2014 to June 28, 2015).

== Schedule ==
Date	Time	Round
July 21, 2015	11:45	Qualification
July 22, 2015	18:05	Final

== Results ==
All results shown are in meters.

KEY:	q	Best non-qualifiers	Q	Qualified	NR	National record	PB	Personal best	SB	Seasonal best	DQ	Disqualified

=== Qualification ===
Automatic qualifier 8.00m

Rank	Group	Name	Nationality	#1	#2	#3	Mark	Wind	Notes
1	B	Jeff Henderson	United States	8.18			8.18	+5.4	Q
2	A	Marquise Goodwin	United States	8.05			8.05	+3.9	Q
3	A	Emiliano Lasa	Uruguay	7.80	8.01		8.01	+3.7	Q
4	B	Diego Hernández	Venezuela	x	7.89	–	7.89	+2.5	q
5	A	Higor Alves	Brazil	x	x	7.86	7.86	+3.0	q
6	B	Luis Rivera	Mexico	7.85	–	–	7.85	+2.8	q
7	B	Yunior Díaz	Cuba	7.68	x	7.76	7.76	+3.8	q
8	A	Tyrone Smith	Bermuda	x	7.72	–	7.72	+4.0	q
9	A	Damar Forbes	Jamaica	x	7.67	x	7.67	+2.4	q
10	A	Quincy Breell	Aruba	7.60	x	x	7.60	+2.6	q
11	A	Daniel Pineda	Chile	7.40	6.76	7.59	7.59	+2.7	q
12	B	Jorge McFarlane	Peru	7.31	7.36	7.52	7.52	+2.7	q
13	A	Jharyl Bowery	Canada	7.21	x	7.52	7.52	+3.0	
14	B	Alexsandro de Melo	Brazil	x	7.51	x	7.51	+2.2	
15	B	Stevens Dorcelus	Canada	7.40	x	7.04	7.40	+3.1	
16	A	Leon Hunt	Virgin Islands	x	x	7.31	7.31	+4.1	
17	B	David Registe	Dominica	7.02	–	–	7.02	+3.9	
	B	Raymond Higgs	Bahamas				DNS		

=== Final ===
Rank	Name	Nationality	#1	#2	#3	#4	#5	#6	Mark	Wind	Notes
1st place, gold medalist(s)	Jeff Henderson	United States	8.54	x	8.21	–	x	8.52	8.54	+4.1	(8.52 +1.8) PB
2nd place, silver medalist(s)	Marquise Goodwin	United States	8.13	x	8.27	x	8.06	x	8.27	+4.5	(8.13 +0.5) SB
3rd place, bronze medalist(s)	Emiliano Lasa	Uruguay	x	8.17	x	x	x	x	8.17	+3.1	
4	Tyrone Smith	Bermuda	x	8.00	8.03	8.01	7.90	8.07	8.07	+2.4	
5	Diego Hernández	Venezuela	x	7.97	7.99	x	3.67	x	7.99	+2.4	
6	Yunior Díaz	Cuba	x	7.90	7.31	7.70	x	7.69	7.90	+5.0	
7	Jorge McFarlane	Peru	7.64	5.89	7.80	7.64	5.75	7.76	7.80	+2.9	(7.76 +1.0) SB
8	Quincy Breell	Aruba	x	7.70	x	x	x	7.27	7.70	+4.4	
9	Luis Rivera	Mexico	7.51	x	7.63				7.63	+3.7	
10	Higor Alves	Brazil	7.60	x	x				7.60	+1.5	
11	Daniel Pineda	Chile	x	7.31	7.46				7.46	+3.0	
	Damar Forbes	Jamaica							DNS		
