= Kimberly Williamson =

Jamaican high jumper

Personal information
- Born: 2 October 1993 (age 32) Frankfield, Jamaica
- Education: Central Arizona College; Kansas State University

Sport
- Sport: Athletics
- Event: High jump
- College team: Kansas State Wildcats
Medal record
Representing Jamaica
Commonwealth Games
Bronze medal – third place	2022 Birmingham	High jump
Pan American Games
Bronze medal – third place	2019 Lima	High jump
Pan American Junior Championships
Bronze medal – third place	2012 Miramar	High jump
Central American and Caribbean Junior Championships
Silver medal – second place	2012 Santo Domingo	High jump
Carifta Games (U20)
Gold medal – first place	2012 Hamilton	High jump

Kimberly Williamson (born 2 October 1993) is a Jamaican athlete specialising in the high jump. She represented her country in the high jump at the 2017 and 2022 World Athletics Championships, finishing 11th in the latter.

Williamson first competed forEdwin Allen High School. She then was an All-American jumper for the Kansas State Wildcats track and field team, winning the high jump at the 2016 NCAA Division I Outdoor Track and Field Championships.

Her personal bests in the event are 1.93 metres outdoors (Nashville 2022) and 1.88 metres indoors (Des Moines 2017).

== International competitions ==
Year	Competition	Venue	Position	Event	Notes
Representing Jamaica
2009	World Youth Championships	Brixen, Italy	17th (q)	High jump	1.74 m
2011	Pan American Junior Athletics Championships	Miramar, United States	3rd	High jump	1.80 m
2012	CARIFTA Games (U20)	Hamilton, Bermuda	1st	High jump	1.82 m
2012	Central American and Caribbean; Junior Championships (U20)	San Salvador, El Salvador	2nd	High jump	1.85 m
2012	World Junior Championships	Barcelona, Spain	27th (q)	High jump	1.70 m
2014	Commonwealth Games	Glasgow, United Kingdom	21st (q)	High jump	1.71 m
2015	Pan American Games	Toronto, Canada	6th	High jump	1.88 m
2017	World Championships	London, United Kingdom	17th (q)	High jump	1.89 m
2019	Pan American Games	Lima, Peru	3rd	High jump	1.84 m
2022	World Championships	Eugene, United States	11th	High jump	1.89 m
2022	NACAC Championships	Freeport, Bahamas	6th	High jump	1.75 m
2023	World Championships	Budapest, Hungary	28th (q)	High jump	1.85 m
