= Antigua and Barbuda at the 1979 Pan American Games =

- IOC code: ANT
- NOC: Antigua and Barbuda National Olympic Committee
- Website: antiguabarbudanoc.com

in San Juan 1–15 July 1979
- Medals Ranked 22nd: Gold 0 Silver 0 Bronze 0 Total 0

Pan American Games appearances (overview)
- 1979; 1983; 1987; 1991; 1995; 1999; 2003; 2007; 2011; 2015; 2019; 2023

The 8th Pan American Games were held in San Juan, Puerto Rico from July 1 to July 15, 1979. Antigua and Barbuda made its debut at the Pan American Games.

== See also ==
- Antigua and Barbuda at the 1976 Summer Olympics
