= Dominica at the 2007 Pan American Games =

- IOC code: DMA
- NOC: Dominica Olympic Committee
- Website: www.doc.dm

in Rio de Janeiro 13–29 July 2007
- Competitors: 14
- Flag bearer: Hubert Joseph
- Medals Ranked 25th: Gold 0 Silver 0 Bronze 1 Total 1

Pan American Games appearances (overview)
- 1995; 1999; 2003; 2007; 2011; 2015; 2019; 2023

The 15th Pan American Games were held in Rio de Janeiro, Brazil, between 13 July 2007 and 29 July 2007.

== Medals ==
=== Bronze ===
===== Athletics =====
- Men's 400 meters: Chris Lloyd
