= Dominica at the Pan American Games =

- IOC code: DMA
- NOC: Dominica Olympic Committee
- Website: www.doc.dm
- Medals Ranked 38th: Gold 0 Silver 2 Bronze 2 Total 4

Pan American Games appearances (overview)
- 1995; 1999; 2003; 2007; 2011; 2015; 2019; 2023

Dominica has competed at every edition of the Pan American Games since the thirteenth edition of the multi-sport event in 1995, having won two silver and one bronze medals. Dominica did not compete at the first and only Pan American Winter Games in 1990.

== Pan American Games ==
=== Medal by games ===
| Year | Host city | Gold | Silver | Bronze | Total |
|---|---|---|---|---|---|
| 1995 | (Argentina) Mar del Plata | 0 | 1 | 0 | 1 |
| 1999 | (Canada) Winnipeg | 0 | 0 | 0 | 0 |
| 2003 | (Dominican Republic) Santo Domingo | 0 | 0 | 0 | 0 |
| 2007 | (Brazil) Rio de Janeiro | 0 | 0 | 1 | 1 |
| 2011 | (Mexico) Guadalajara | 0 | 1 | 0 | 1 |
| 2015 | (Canada) Toronto | 0 | 0 | 0 | 0 |
| 2019 | (Peru) Lima | 0 | 0 | 0 | 0 |
| 2023 | (Chile) Santiago | 0 | 0 | 1 | 1 |
| Total | | 0 | 2 | 2 | 4 |

=== Medals by sport ===
| Sport | Gold | Silver | Bronze | Total |
|---|---|---|---|---|
| Athletics | 0 | 2 | 2 | 4 |
| Totals (1 entries) | 0 | 2 | 2 | 4 |

== Junior Pan American Games ==
=== Medals by games ===
| Year | Edition | Host city | Rank | Gold | Silver | Bronze | Total |
|---|---|---|---|---|---|---|---|
| 2021 | I | (Colombia) Cali-Valle | - | 0 | 0 | 0 | 0 |
| 2025 | II | (Paraguay) Asunción | 26th | 1 | 0 | 0 | 1 |
| Total | | | 27th | 1 | 0 | 0 | 1 |

=== Medals by sport ===
| Sport | Gold | Silver | Bronze | Total |
|---|---|---|---|---|
| Athletics | 1 | 0 | 0 | 1 |
| Totals (1 entries) | 1 | 0 | 0 | 1 |
