= Dominica at the 2015 Pan American Games =

- IOC code: DMA
- NOC: Dominica Olympic Committee
- Website: www.doc.dm

in Toronto, Canada 10–26 July 2015
- Competitors: 5 in 2 sports
- Flag bearer (opening): David Registe
- Flag bearer (closing): Yordanis Durañona
- Medals: Gold 0 Silver 0 Bronze 0 Total 0

Pan American Games appearances (overview)
- 1995; 1999; 2003; 2007; 2011; 2015; 2019; 2023; 2027

Dominica competed at the 2015 Pan American Games in Toronto, Ontario, Canada from July 10 to 26, 2015.

Track and field athlete David Registe was the flagbearer for the team during the opening ceremony. A total of six officials accompined the team.

Dominica (along with nine other countries) left the games without winning a medal, marking the first time since 2003 the country failed to medal. Athlete Yordanis Durañona, had the country's highest placement, a fourth place finish in the triple jump, just off the podium.

== Competitors ==
The following table lists Dominica's delegation per sport and gender.

Sport	Men	Women	Total
Athletics	3	1	4
Boxing	0	1	1
Total	3	2	5

== Athletics ==
Dominica qualified four athletes (three men and one woman).

Key

- Note – Ranks given for track events are for the entire round
- PB = Personal best
- NM = No mark
- N/A = Round not applicable for the event

Men
Field events

Athlete(s)	Event	Qualification		Final	
Athlete(s)	Event	Result	Rank	Result	Rank
Dillon Simon	Discus Throw	—N/a		NM	
Dillon Simon	Shot Put	—N/a		19.55	7
David Registe	Long Jump	7.02	8	did not advance	
Yordanis Durañona	Triple Jump	—N/a		16.72	4

Women
Field events

Athlete(s)	Event	Final	
Athlete(s)	Event	Result	Rank
Thea LaFond	High Jump	1.80	13
Thea LaFond	Triple Jump	13.35 PB	12

== Boxing ==
Dominica qualified one female boxer.

Woman

Athlete	Event	Quarterfinals	Semifinals	Final
Athlete	Event	Opposition Result	Opposition Result	Opposition Result
Valerian Spicer	Light welterweight	Victoria Torres (MEX); L 0–3	did not advance	

== See also ==
- Dominica at the 2016 Summer Olympics
