= Emiliano Lasa =

Uruguayan long jumper (born 1990)

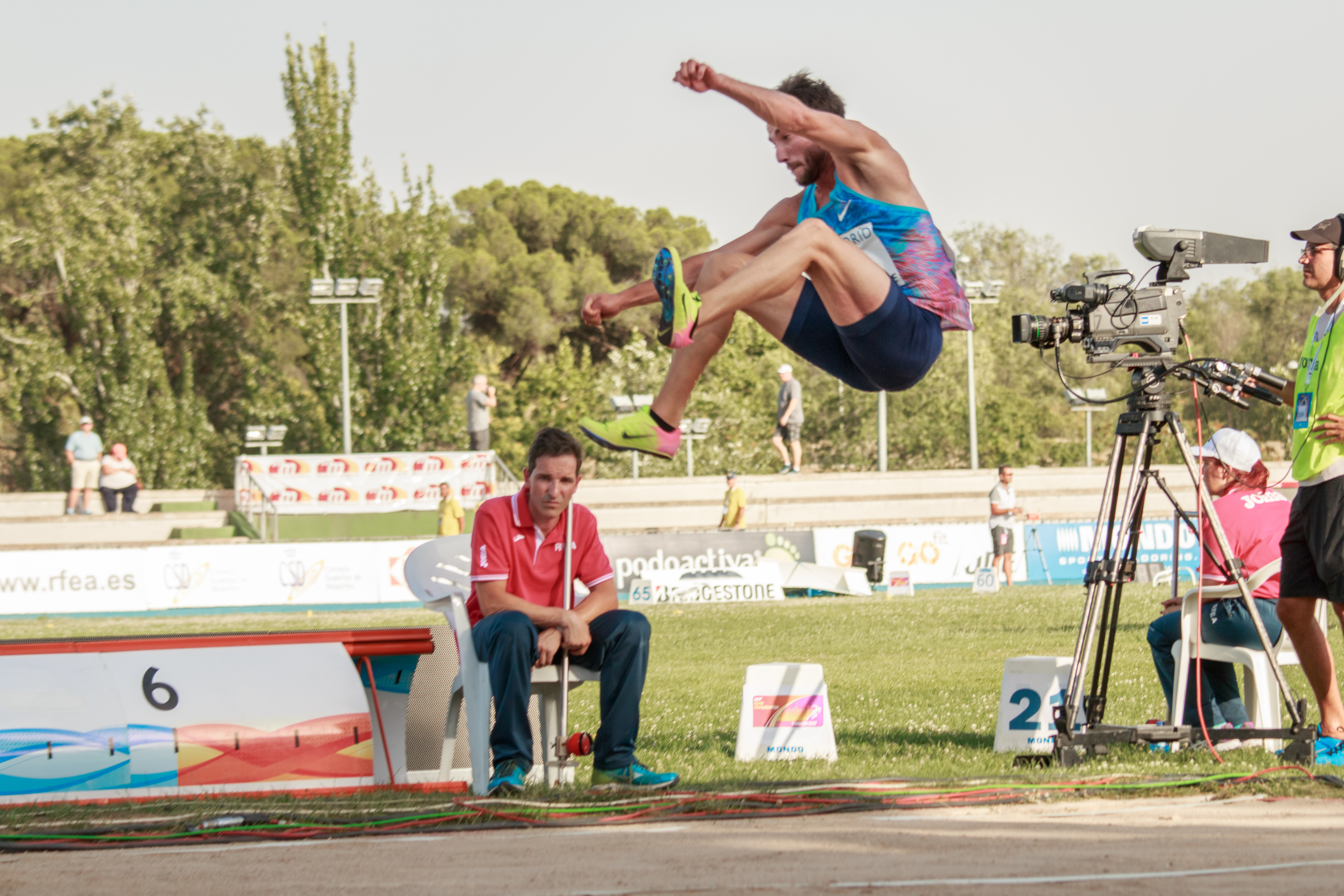
- Emiliano Lasa jumping during the IAAF World Challenge Madrid Meeting 2017.

Personal information
- Full name: Emiliano Lasa Sánchez
- Nationality: Uruguay
- Born: 25 January 1990 (age 36) Montevideo, Uruguay
- Height: 1.80 m (5 ft 11 in)
- Weight: 75 kg (165 lb)

Sport
- Sport: Track and field
- Event: Long Jump

Achievements and titles
- Personal best: LJ: 8.26 m A (Cochabamba 2018)
Medal record
Men's athletics
Representing Uruguay
Pan American Games
Bronze medal – third place	2015 Toronto	Long Jump
Bronze medal – third place	2019 Lima	Long Jump
South American Games
Gold medal – first place	2018 Cochabamba	Long jump
Silver medal – second place	2014 Santiago	Long jump
Silver medal – second place	2026 Santa Fe	Long jump
Silver medal – second place	2022 Asuncion	Long jump
South American Championships
Gold medal – first place	2015 Lima	Long jump
Gold medal – first place	2019 Lima	Long jump
Gold medal – first place	2023 Sao Paulo	Long jump
Gold medal – first place	2025 Mar del Plata	Long jump
Silver medal – second place	2017 Asuncion	Long jump
Silver medal – second place	2021 Guayaquil	Long jump
South American U23 Championships
Bronze medal – third place	2012 São Paulo	Long jump
- Updated on 23 July 2015

Emiliano Lasa Sánchez (born January 25, 1990) is a Uruguayan track and field athlete who competes in the long jump. He won a bronze medal at the 2015 Pan American Games, as well as several others on continental level. His personal best in the event is 8.28 m (27 ft 1 3/4 in) which is the current national record.

The Uruguayan Olympic Committee chose him and TKD practitioner María Sara Grippoli to be the flag bearers for Uruguay at the Paris 2024 Olympic Games.

== Competition record ==
Year	Competition	Venue	Position	Event	Notes
Representing Uruguay
2009	South American Championships	Lima, Peru	4th	Long jump	7.14 m
2009	South American Junior Championships	São Paulo, Brazil	4th	Long jump	7.42 m
2010	South American Games / South American U23 Championships	Medellín, Colombia	4th	Long jump	7.33 m
2011	Pan American Games	Guadalajara, Mexico	5th	Long jump	7.73 m
2012	Ibero-American Championships	Barquisimeto, Venezuela	4th	Long jump	7.56 m
2012	South American U23 Championships	São Paulo, Brazil	3rd	Long jump	7.63 m (w)
2013	South American Championships	Cartagena, Colombia	9th	Long jump	7.21 m
2014	South American Games	Santiago, Chile	2nd	Long jump	7.94 m
2014	Ibero-American Championships	São Paulo, Brazil	4th	Long jump	7.66 m
2014	Pan American Sports Festival	Mexico City, Mexico	5th	Long jump	7.77 m
2015	South American Championships	Lima, Peru	1st	Long jump	8.09 m
2015	Pan American Games	Toronto, Canada	3rd	Long jump	8.17 m (w)
2015	World Championships	Beijing, China	15th (q)	Long jump	7.95 m
2016	World Indoor Championships	Portland, United States	7th	Long jump	7.94 m
2016	Ibero-American Championships	Rio de Janeiro, Brazil	1st	Long jump	8.01 m
2016	Olympic Games	Rio de Janeiro, Brazil	6th	Long jump	8.10 m
2017	South American Championships	Asunción, Paraguay	2nd	Long jump	7.89 m
2017	World Championships	London, United Kingdom	9th	Long jump	8.11 m
2017	IAAF Diamond League Finals	Zürich, Switzerland	6th	Long jump	7.79 m
2018	World Indoor Championships	Birmingham, United Kingdom	12th	Long jump	7.72 m
2018	South American Games	Cochabamba, Bolivia	1st	Long jump	8.26 m
2018	Ibero-American Championships	Trujillo, Peru	3rd	Long jump	7.79 m
2018	IAAF Continental Cup	Ostrava, Czech Republic	6th	Long jump	7.73 m
2019	South American Championships	Lima, Peru	1st	Long jump	7.76 m
2019	Pan American Games	Lima, Peru	3rd	Long jump	7.87 m
2019	World Championships	Doha, Qatar	20th (q)	Long jump	7.66 m
2021	South American Championships	Guayaquil, Ecuador	2nd	Long jump	7.94 m
2021	Olympic Games	Tokyo, Japan	13th (q)	Long jump	7.95 m
2022	South American Indoor Championships	Cochabamba, Bolivia	2nd	Long jump	8.10 m
2022	World Indoor Championships	Belgrade, Serbia	6th	Long jump	7.99 m
2022	Ibero-American Championships	La Nucía, Spain	4th	Long jump	7.96 m
2022	World Championships	Eugene, United States	13th (q)	Long jump	7.89 m
2022	South American Games	Asunción, Paraguay	2nd	Long jump	7.93 m
2023	South American Championships	São Paulo, Brazil	1st	Long jump	8.08 m
2023	World Championships	Budapest, Hungary	24th (q)	Long jump	7.72 m
2023	Pan American Games	Santiago, Chile	4th	Long jump	8.00 m
2024	South American Indoor Championships	Cochabamba, Bolivia	2nd	Long jump	8.00 m
2024	World Indoor Championships	Glasgow, United Kingdom	10th	Long jump	7.74 m
2024	Ibero-American Championships	Cuiabá, Brazil	1st	Long jump	7.98 m
2024	Olympic Games	Paris, France	13th (q)	Long jump	7.87 m
2025	South American Indoor Championships	Cochabamba, Bolivia	3rd	Long jump	7.79 m
2025	South American Championships	Mar del Plata, Argentina	1st	Long jump	7.97 m
2025	World Championships	Tokyo, Japan	28th (q)	Long jump	7.67 m
2026	South American Indoor Championships	Cochabamba, Bolivia	4th	Long jump	7.66 m
2026	Ibero-American Championships	Lima, Peru	3rd	Long jump	7.88 m
2026	Pan American Championships	Medellín, Colombia	1st	Long jump	7.99 m
2026	South American Games	Santa Fe, Argentina	2nd	Long jump	7.83 m

Olympic Games
Preceded by Déborah Rodríguez; Bruno Cetraro	Flagbearer for Uruguay; París 2024; With: María Sara Grippoli	Succeeded by Incumbent
