= Antigua and Barbuda at the 2011 Pan American Games =

- IOC code: ANT
- NOC: Antigua and Barbuda National Olympic Committee
- Website: antiguabarbudanoc.com

in Guadalajara 14–30 October 2011
- Competitors: 7 in 3 sports
- Flag bearer: Robert Marsh
- Medals: Gold 0 Silver 0 Bronze 0 Total 0

Pan American Games appearances (overview)
- 1979; 1983; 1987; 1991; 1995; 1999; 2003; 2007; 2011; 2015; 2019; 2023

Antigua and Barbuda competed at the 2011 Pan American Games in Guadalajara, Mexico from October 14 through October 30, 2011. The Chef de Mission of the team was Daryll S Matthew. Antigua and Barbuda's final team consisted of seven athletes in three sports.

== Athletics ==
Antigua and Barbuda sent three athletes. Their top sprinter and defending Pan American Games champion Daniel Bailey withdrew due to injury.

Men

Athlete	Event	Semifinals		Final	
Athlete	Event	Result	Rank	Result	Rank
Richard Richardson	400 m	48.49	7th	Did not advance	
James Grayman	High jump			2.24 m.	4th

Women

Athlete	Event	Final	
Athlete	Event	Result	Rank
Althea Charles	Hammer throw	59.49 m.	11th

== Cycling ==
=== Road ===
Antigua and Barbuda qualified one male cyclist in road cycling. Antigua and Barbuda also received a wildcard to send another female cyclist.

Men

Athlete	Event	Time	Rank
Robert Marsh	Men's road race	4:02:22	40th
Robert Marsh	Men's time trial	56:49.77	14th

Women

Athlete	Event	Time	Rank
Tamiko Butler	Women's road race	2:24:04	32nd
Tamiko Butler	Women's time trial	31:39.73	14th

== Swimming ==
Antigua and Barbuda sent two swimmers.

Men

Athlete	Event	Heats		Final	
Athlete	Event	Time	Rank	Time	Rank
Orel Jeffrey	100 m freestyle	1:03.84	24th	Did not advance	

Women

Athlete	Event	Heats		Final	
Athlete	Event	Time	Rank	Time	Rank
Karin O'Reilly	50 m freestyle	31.41	19th	Did not advance	
