= Jeanelle Scheper =

Saint Lucian high jumper

Personal information
- Born: 21 November 1994 (age 31) Kingston, Jamaica
- Height: 177 cm (5 ft 10 in)
- Weight: 60 kg (132 lb)

Sport
- Sport: Track and field
- Event: High jump
- College team: University of South Carolina

Jeanelle Scheper (born 21 November 1994) is a Saint Lucian high jumper. She is the second athlete from St. Lucia to qualify for the high jump final in the World Championships in Athletics after Levern Spencer did it starting in 2007 when in 2015 she joined Spencer in the final.

== Career ==
She was born in Kingston, Jamaica to Gerit Scheper a Barbadian father and Cheryl Scheper a St Lucian mother and moved to Saint Lucia with her family at the age of two. While representing the University of South Carolina, Scheper became the 2015 NCAA Champion before graduating.

She competed for St. Lucia at the 2016 Summer Olympics in Rio de Janeiro. She placed 26th in qualifying and did not advance to the finals. She was the flag bearer for St. Lucia during the closing ceremony.

Her personal bests in the high jump are 1.96 metres outdoors (Starkville 2015) and 1.91 metres indoors (Fayetteville 2013).

== Competition record ==
Year	Competition	Venue	Position	Event	Notes
Representing Saint Lucia
2010	CARIFTA Games (U17)	George Town, Cayman Islands	7th	100 m H	15.37 (w)
2010	CARIFTA Games (U17)	George Town, Cayman Islands	3rd	High jump	1.68 m
2010	CARIFTA Games (U17)	George Town, Cayman Islands	3rd	Long jump	5.28 m
2011	CARIFTA Games (U20)	Montego Bay, Jamaica	3rd	High jump	1.70 m
2011	World Youth Championships	Lille, France	25th (q)	High jump	1.67 m
2011	Commonwealth Youth Games	Douglas, Isle of Man	2nd	High jump	1.76 m
2012	CARIFTA Games (U20)	Hamilton, Bermuda	3rd	High jump	1.80 m
2012	Central American and Caribbean; Junior Championships (U20)	San Salvador, El Salvador	1st	High jump	1.85 m
2012	World Junior Championships	Barcelona, Spain	8th	High jump	1.82 m
2013	CARIFTA Games (U20)	Nassau, Bahamas	1st	High jump	1.87 m
2013	Central American and Caribbean Championships	Morelia, Mexico	2nd	High jump	1.92 m
2013	World Championships	Moscow, Russia	24th (q)	High jump	1.83 m
2014	Commonwealth Games	Glasgow, United Kingdom	4th	High jump	1.89 m
2014	Pan American Sports Festival	Mexico City, Mexico	2nd	High jump	1.85 m
2015	Pan American Games	Toronto, Canada	5th	High jump	1.88 m
2015	World Championships	Beijing, China	7th	High jump	1.92 m
2016	Olympic Games	Rio de Janeiro, Brazil	25th (q)	High jump	1.89 m
2018	Commonwealth Games	Gold Coast, Australia	9th	High jump	1.80 m
2019	Pan American Games	Lima, Peru	4th	High jump	1.84 m
