= Antigua and Barbuda at the Pan American Games =

- IOC code: ANT
- NOC: Antigua and Barbuda National Olympic Committee
- Website: antiguabarbudanoc.com
- Medals Ranked 28th: Gold 1 Silver 2 Bronze 5 Total 8

Pan American Games appearances (overview)
- 1979; 1983; 1987; 1991; 1995; 1999; 2003; 2007; 2011; 2015; 2019; 2023

Antigua and Barbuda has competed at every edition of the Pan American Games since the eighth edition of the multi-sport event in 1979. However, Antigua and Barbuda participated in the 1959 Pan American Games as part of the British West Indies and future Prime Minister Lester Bird won a bronze medal in the long jump. Sprinter Heather Samuel won Antigua and Barbuda's first Pan Am medal in 1995, a bronze in the women's 100 metres. Sprinter, Brendan Christian won Antigua and Barbuda's first gold medal at the 2007 Pan American Games. To date, all five of Antigua and Barbuda's medals have been won in the sport of track and field. Antigua and Barbuda did not compete at the first and only Pan American Winter Games in 1990.

== Medal count ==
To sort the tables by host city, total medal count, or any other column, click on the icon next to the column title.

=== Summer ===
Year	Ref.	Edition	Host city	Rank	Gold	Silver	Bronze	Total
1951		I	(Argentina) Buenos Aires	Did not participate				
1955		II	Mexico City	Did not participate				
1959		III	(United States) Chicago	Did not participate				
1963		IV	(Brazil) São Paulo	Did not participate				
1967		V	(Canada) Winnipeg	Did not participate				
1971		VI	(Colombia) Cali	Did not participate				
1975		VII	Mexico City	Did not participate				
1979		VIII	(Puerto Rico) San Juan	—	0	0	0	0
1983		IX	(Venezuela) Caracas	—	0	0	0	0
1987		X	(United States) Indianapolis	—	0	0	0	0
1991		XI	(Cuba) Havana	—	0	0	0	0
1995		XII	(Argentina) Mar del Plata	29th	0	0	1	1
1999		XIII	(Canada) Winnipeg	—	0	0	0	0
2003		XIV	(Dominican Republic) Santo Domingo	—	0	0	0	0
2007		XV	(Brazil) Rio de Janeiro	18th	1	0	2	3
2011		XVI	(Mexico) Guadalajara	—	0	0	0	0
2015		XVII	(Canada) Toronto	25th	0	1	0	1
2019		XVIII	(Peru) Lima	26th	0	1	2	3
2023		XIX	(Chile) Santiago	28th	0	1	0	1
Total				28th	1	3	5	9

=== Winter ===
Year	Ref.	Edition	Host city	Rank	Gold	Silver	Bronze	Total
1990		I	(Argentina) Las Leñas	Did not participate				
Total				—	0	0	0	0
