= Antigua and Barbuda at the 2007 Pan American Games =

- IOC code: ANT
- NOC: Antigua and Barbuda National Olympic Committee
- Website: antiguabarbudanoc.com

in Rio de Janeiro 13–29 July 2007
- Competitors: 9 in 3 sports
- Flag bearer: Jeremy Williams
- Medals Ranked 18th: Gold 1 Silver 0 Bronze 2 Total 3

Pan American Games appearances (overview)
- 1979; 1983; 1987; 1991; 1995; 1999; 2003; 2007; 2011; 2015; 2019; 2023

The 15th Pan American Games were held in Rio de Janeiro, Brazil, between 13 July 2007 and 29 July 2007. The Antiguan and Barbudan delegation had 9 athletes (8 men and 1 woman), participating in 3 sports and winning its first ever gold medal at the Pan American Games.

== Medals ==
| Medal | Name | Sport | Event |
|---|---|---|---|
| Gold | Brendan Christian | Athletics | Men's 200 m |
| Bronze | Brendan Christian | Athletics | Men's 100 m |
| Bronze | James Grayman | Athletics | Men's High Jump |

== Athletics ==
Men

| Athlete | Event | Heats | | Semifinals | | Final | |
| Athlete | Event | Result | Rank | Result | Rank | Result | Rank |
|---|---|---|---|---|---|---|---|
| Daniel Bailey | 100m | 10.46 | 14 q | did not finish | | did not advance | |
| Brendan Christian | 100m | 10.34 | 7 Q | 10.24 | 3 Q | 10.26 | 3rd place, bronze medalist(s) |
| Brendan Christian | 200m | 20.51 | 1 Q | 20.33 | 1 Q | 10.26 | 1st place, gold medalist(s) |
| James Grayman | High jump | | | | | 2.24 | 3rd place, bronze medalist(s) |
| Ayata Joseph | Triple jump | | | | | 15.73 | 8 |

Women

| Athlete | Event | Heats | | Semifinals | | Final | |
| Athlete | Event | Result | Rank | Result | Rank | Result | Rank |
|---|---|---|---|---|---|---|---|
| Sonia Williams | 100m | 11.89 | 21 | did not advance | | | |

== See also ==
- Antigua and Barbuda at the 2006 Commonwealth Games
- Antigua and Barbuda at the 2008 Summer Olympics
