= Athletics at the 2014 Commonwealth Games – Women's high jump =

Women's high jump at the Commonwealth Games

The Women's high jump at the 2014 Commonwealth Games, as part of the athletics programme, was a two-day event held at Hampden Park on 30 July and 1 August 2014.

== Results ==
=== Qualifying round ===
Qualification: 1.85 (Q) or 12 best performers (q) advance to the Final.

Rank	Group	Athlete	1.66	1.71	1.76	1.81	1.85	Result	Notes
1	B	Leontia Kallenou (CYP)	–	–	o	o	o	1.85	Q
1	B	Jayne Nisbet (SCO)	–	o	o	o	o	1.85	Q
1	B	Eleanor Patterson (AUS)	–	–	–	o	o	1.85	Q
1	A	Isobel Pooley (ENG)	–	–	o	o	o	1.85	Q
1	B	Jeanelle Scheper (LCA)	–	–	o	o	o	1.85	Q
1	A	Levern Spencer (LCA)	–	–	–	o	o	1.85	Q
1	A	Zoe Timmers (AUS)	–	o	o	o	o	1.85	Q
8	B	Sarah Cowley (NZL)	–	o	o	xxo	o	1.85	Q
9	B	Saniel Atkinson-Grier (JAM)	–	–	o	xo	xo	1.85	Q
9	A	Hannah Joye (AUS)	–	–	o	xo	xo	1.85	Q
11	A	Thea LaFond (DMA)	o	o	o	o	xxx	1.81	q
11	B	Nagaraj Gobbargumpi (IND)	–	o	o	o	xxx	1.81	q
13	A	Priscilla Frederick (ANT)	–	–	xo	o	xxx	1.81	
14	A	Emma Nuttall (SCO)	–	o	o	xo	xxx	1.81	
14	B	Bethan Partridge (ENG)	–	o	o	xo	xxx	1.81	
16	B	Rachel McKenzie (SCO)	o	o	o	xxx		1.76	
17	A	Deandra Daniel (TRI)	xo	o	o	xxx		1.76	
18	A	Reagan Dee (IOM)	o	o	xxx			1.71	
18	A	Lissa Labiche (SEY)	o	o	xxx			1.71	
18	A	Naya Owusu (GHA)	o	o	xxx			1.71	
21	B	Shinelle Proctor (AIA)	xo	o	xxx			1.71	
21	A	Kimberly Williamson (JAM)	xo	o	xxx			1.71	
23	A	Sean Yee Yap (MAS)	o	xxo	xxx			1.71	
24	B	Ashleigh Nalty (CAY)	xxo	xxo	xxx			1.71	
	B	Selloane Tsoaeli (LES)						DNS	

=== Final ===
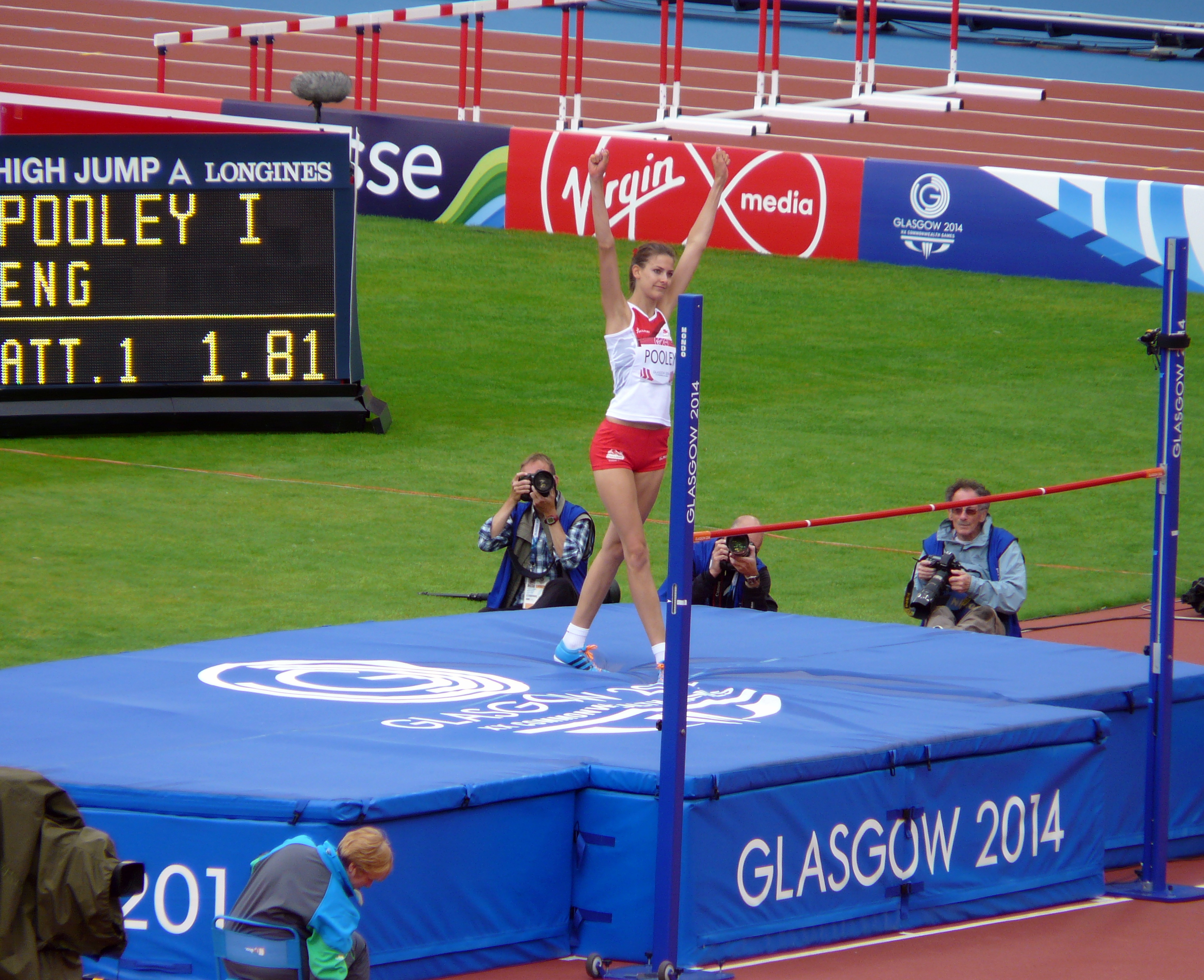
Silver medalist, Isobel Pooley, during the qualification round

Rank	Athlete	1.78	1.82	1.86	1.89	1.92	1.94	1.96	Result	Notes
1st place, gold medalist(s)	Eleanor Patterson (AUS)	–	–	o	o	xo	o	xxx	1.94	=SB
2nd place, silver medalist(s)	Isobel Pooley (ENG)	o	o	o	o	o	xxx		1.92	PB
3rd place, bronze medalist(s)	Levern Spencer (LCA)	–	o	o	xo	xxo	x–	xx	1.92	
4	Leontia Kallenou (CYP)	–	o	o	xo	xxx			1.89	
4	Jeanelle Scheper (LCA)	–	o	o	xo	xxx			1.89	
6	Hannah Joye (AUS)	o	o	xo	xxo	xxx			1.89	=PB
7	Saniel Atkinson-Grier (JAM)	xo	xxo	o	xxx				1.86	SB
8	Nagaraj Gobbargumpi (IND)	o	o	xo	xxx				1.86	
9	Sarah Cowley (NZL)	o	xo	xxo	xxx				1.86	
10	Jayne Nisbet (SCO)	o	xxx						1.78	
10	Zoe Timmers (AUS)	o	xxx						1.78	
	Thea LaFond (DMA)	xxx							NM	
