= Antigua and Barbuda at the 2019 Pan American Games =

- IOC code: ANT
- NOC: Antigua and Barbuda National Olympic Committee
- Website: antiguabarbudanoc.com

in Lima, Peru 26 July–11 August, 2019
- Competitors: 9 in 5 sports
- Flag bearer: Jalese Gordon (opening)
- Medals Ranked 26th: Gold 0 Silver 1 Bronze 2 Total 3

Pan American Games appearances (overview)
- 1979; 1983; 1987; 1991; 1995; 1999; 2003; 2007; 2011; 2015; 2019; 2023

Antigua and Barbuda competed at the 2019 Pan American Games in Lima, Peru from July 26 to August 11, 2019.

The Antigua and Barbuda team consisted of nine athletes across five sports. This marked a decrease of one from the last edition of the games in 2015. During the opening ceremony of the games, sailor Jalese Gordon carried the flag of the country as part of the parade of nations.

== Competitors ==
The following is the list of number of competitors (per gender) participating at the games per sport/discipline.

Sport	Men	Women	Total
Athletics	1	1	2
Boxing	1	0	1
Sailing	2	1	3
Swimming	1	1	2
Tennis	1	0	1
Total	6	3	9

== Medalists ==
The following competitors from Antigua and Barbuda won medals at the games. In the by discipline sections below, medalists' names are bolded.

Medal	Name	Sport	Event	Date
Silver	Priscilla Frederick	Athletics	Women's high jump	August 8
Bronze	Alston Ryan	Boxing	Men's 64 kg	August 2
Bronze	Cejhae Greene	Athletics	Men's 100 metres	August 7

**Medals by sport**
**Sport**	1st place, gold medalist(s)	2nd place, silver medalist(s)	3rd place, bronze medalist(s)	**Total**
Athletics	0	1	1	2
Boxing	0	0	1	1
**Total**	**0**	**1**	**2**	**3**

== Athletics (track and field) ==
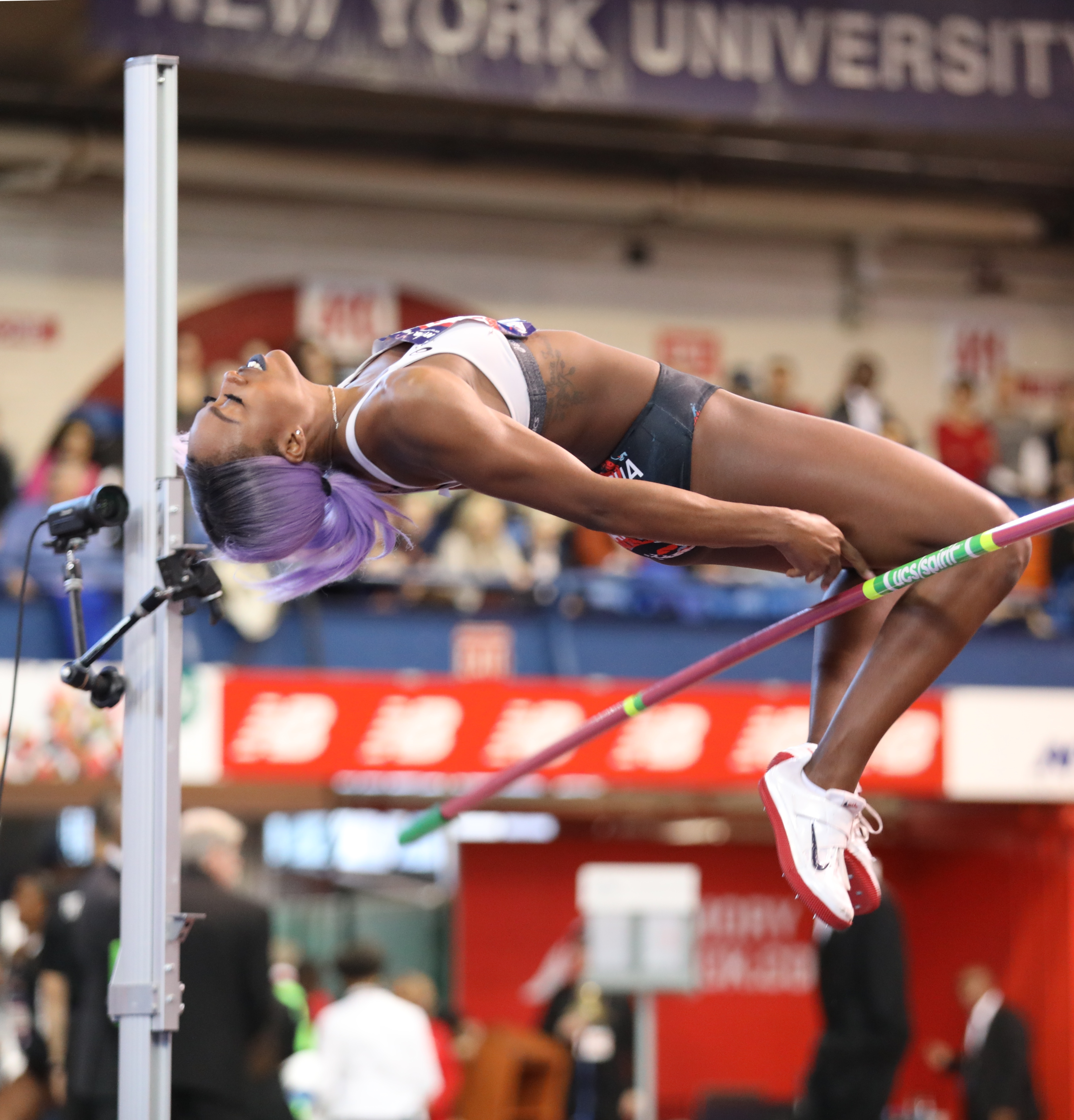
Priscilla Frederick won silver in the women's high jump for the second consecutive games

Antigua and Barbuda qualified two athletes (one per gender). Both Priscilla Frederick and Cejhae Greene would go on to win medals in their respective events. Frederick would match her performance from four years prior in Toronto.

Key

- Note–Ranks given for track events are for the entire round
- **Q** = Qualified for the next round directly
- **SB** = Seasonal best

Track event
Men

Athlete	Event	Semifinals		Final	
Athlete	Event	Result	Rank	Result	Rank
**Cejhae Greene**	100 m	10.31	4 **Q**	10.23	3rd place, bronze medalist(s)

Field event
Women

Athlete	Event	Final	
Athlete	Event	Distance	Position
**Priscilla Frederick**	High jump	1.87 **SB**	2nd place, silver medalist(s)

== Boxing ==
Antigua and Barbuda qualified one male boxer, Alston Ryan, who would go on to win a bronze medal.

Men

Athlete	Event	Preliminaries	Quarterfinals	Semifinals	Final	Rank
Athlete	Event	Opposition Result	Opposition Result	Opposition Result	Opposition Result	Rank
**Alston Ryan**	64 kg	Bye	German (PER); **W** 4–1	Cruz (CUB); **L** 0–5	Did not advance	3rd place, bronze medalist(s)

== Sailing ==
Antigua and Barbuda qualified one male sailor (kites). The country later received two universality spots in the laser events.

Key

- **DNF**= Do not finish
- **STP** = Standard penalty
- **UFD** = U flag disqualification

Athlete	Event	Race																					Net points	Final rank
Athlete	Event	1	2	3	4	5	6	7	8	9	10	11	12	13	14	15	16	17	18	M1	M2	M3	Net points	Final rank
Jules Mitchell	Men's laser	11	17	19	21	16	12	17	16	STP	17	—N/a								Did not qualify	—N/a		142	18
Jalese Gordon	Women's laser radial	18	18	DNF	18	18	16	18	UFD	17	DNF	—N/a								Did not qualify	—N/a		161	18
Tiger Tyson	Open kites	5	6	RDG	RDG	8	6	4	6	10	4	6	7	8	4	3	6	4	5	Did not qualify			77.8	6

== Swimming ==
Antigua and Barbuda received two universality spots in swimming to enter one man and one woman.

Key

- Note – Ranks given are for the entire round

Athlete	Event	Heat		Final	
Athlete	Event	Time	Rank	Time	Rank
Lleyton Martin	Men's 50 m freestyle	25.00	31	Did not advance	
Lleyton Martin	Men's 100 m freestyle	55.45	27	Did not advance	
Lleyton Martin	Men's 100 m butterfly	58.28	22	Did not advance	
Bianca Mitchell	Women's 50 m freestyle	29.30	28	Did not advance	
Bianca Mitchell	Women's 100 m freestyle	1:04.21	27	Did not advance	
Bianca Mitchell	Women's 20 m freestyle	2:18.70	24	Did not advance	

== Tennis ==
Antigua and Barbuda received one wildcard to enter a male singles competitor.

Men

Athlete	Event	First round	Round of 32	Round of 16	Quarterfinals	Semifinals	Final / BM	
Athlete	Event	Opposition Score	Opposition Score	Opposition Score	Opposition Score	Opposition Score	Opposition Score	Rank
Jody Maginley	Singles	Johnson (ESA); **W** 6–4, 6–3	Tabilo (CHI); **L** 1–6, 3–6	Did not advance				

== See also ==
- Antigua and Barbuda at the 2020 Summer Olympics
