= Dominica at the 2003 Pan American Games =

- IOC code: DMA
- NOC: Dominica Olympic Committee
- Website: www.doc.dm

in Santo Domingo 1–17 August 2003
- Flag bearer: Chris Lloyd
- Medals Ranked 33rd: Gold 0 Silver 0 Bronze 0 Total 0

Pan American Games appearances (overview)
- 1995; 1999; 2003; 2007; 2011; 2015; 2019; 2023

The 14th Pan American Games were held in Santo Domingo, Dominican Republic from August 1 to August 17, 2003.

== See also ==
- Dominica at the 2004 Summer Olympics
