= Athletics at the 2023 Pan American Games – Women's triple jump =

Women's triple jump at the 2023 Pan American Games
- Venue: Julio Martínez National Stadium
- Dates: November 2
- Competitors: 9 from 6 nations
- Winning distance: 14.75

Medalists
Gold medal	Leyanis Pérez	Cuba
Silver medal	Liadagmis Povea	Cuba
Bronze medal	Thea LaFond	Dominica

The women's triple jump competition of the athletics events at the 2023 Pan American Games took place on November 2 at the Julio Martínez National Stadium.

== Records ==
Prior to this competition, the existing world and Pan American Games records were as follows:

World record	Yulimar Rojas (VEN)	15.74	Belgrade, Serbia	March 20, 2022
Pan American Games record	Yulimar Rojas (VEN)	15.11	Lima, Peru	August 9, 2019

== Schedule ==
Date	Time	Round
November 2, 2023	19:47	Final

== Results ==
All marks shown are in meters.

KEY:	q	Fastest non-qualifiers	Q	Qualified	NR	National record	PB	Personal best	SB	Seasonal best	DQ	Disqualified

=== Final ===
The results were as follows:

Rank	Name	Nationality	#1	#2	#3	#4	#5	#6	Mark	Notes
1st place, gold medalist(s)	Leyanis Pérez	Cuba	14.68	14.46	14.75	14.72	x	14.00	14.75	
2nd place, silver medalist(s)	Liadagmis Povea	Cuba	14.36	14.41	14.21	12.57	11.91	13.94	14.41	
3rd place, bronze medalist(s)	Thea LaFond	Dominica	14.25	14.06	x	14.03	14.08	14.12	14.25	
4	Gabriele Santos	Brazil	13.11	13.57	x	x	x	13.65	13.65	
5	Mylana Hearn	United States	12.88	13.17	x	12.99	12.87	13.32	13.32	
6	Núbia Soares	Brazil	x	x	12.62	x	12.78	x	12.78	SB
7	Thelma Fuentes	Independent Athletes Team	12.32	x	12.12	12.44	12.66	x	12.66	
8	Valeria Quispe	Bolivia	12.40	12.26	12.09	11.95	x	x	12.40	
9	Euphenie Andre	United States	11.97	12.14	x				12.14	
