= Antigua and Barbuda at the 2023 Pan American Games =

- IOC code: ANT
- NOC: Antigua and Barbuda National Olympic Committee
- Website: antiguabarbudanoc.com

in Santiago, Chile 20 October 2023 – 5 November 2023
- Competitors: 8 in 5 sports
- Flag bearer (opening): Tiger Tyson
- Flag bearers (closing): Tiger Tyson & LaNica Locker
- Medals Ranked =28th: Gold 0 Silver 1 Bronze 0 Total 1

Pan American Games appearances (overview)
- 1979; 1983; 1987; 1991; 1995; 1999; 2003; 2007; 2011; 2015; 2019; 2023

Antigua and Barbuda is scheduled to compete at the 2023 Pan American Games in Santiago, Chile from October 20 to November 5, 2023. This was Antigua and Barbuda's 12th appearance at the Pan American Games, having competed at every edition of the Games since 1979.

On October 18, The Antigua and Barbuda Olympic Association named a team of eight athletes (seven men and one woman) competing in five sports. Sailor Tiger Tyson was the country's flagbearers during the opening ceremony. Meanwhile, Tyson and track athlete LaNica Locker were the country's flagbearers during the closing ceremony.

== Medalists ==
The following Antigua and Barbuda competitors won medals at the games. In the by discipline sections below, medalists' names are bolded.

Medal	Name	Sport	Event	Date
Silver	Tiger Tyson	Sailing	Men's kites	November 3

== Competitors ==
The following is the list of number of competitors (per gender) participating at the games per sport/discipline.

Sport	Men	Women	Total
Athletics (track and field)	0	1	1
Boxing	2	0	2
Sailing	2	0	2
Swimming	2	0	2
Tennis	1	0	1
Total	7	1	8

== Athletics ==
Antigua and Barbuda qualified one female athlete.

Key

- Note–Ranks given for track events are within the athlete's heat only
- **Q** = Qualified for the next round
- **q** = Qualified for the next round as a fastest loser
- Bye = Athlete not required to compete in round

Women

Track & road events

Athlete	Event	Semifinal		Final	
Athlete	Event	Result	Rank	Result	Rank
La'nica Locker	200 m	23.94	7 **Q**	24.28	7

== Boxing ==
Antigua and Barbuda entered two male boxers. Alston Ryan lost his first match and was eliminated. Meanwhile, Yakita Aska was eliminated in the quarterfinals after one victory.

Men

Athlete	Event	Round of 32	Round of 16	Quarterfinals	Semifinals	Final	
Athlete	Event	Opposition Result	Opposition Result	Opposition Result	Opposition Result	Opposition Result	Rank
Alston Ryan	–63.5 kg	Bye	Contreras (ESA); **L** 0–5	Did not advance			
Yakita Aska	–92 kg	—N/a	Pompey (GUY); **W** 4–1	Colwell (CAN); **L** 2–3	Did not advance		

== Sailing ==
Antigua and Barbuda qualified one boat in men's kites. The country later received two reallocated spots, one each in the laser and laser radial events respectively. The laser radial quota was later declined.

Men

Athlete	Event	Opening series																		Finals		
Athlete	Event	1	2	3	4	5	6	7	8	9	10	11	12	13	14	15	16	Points	Rank	M	Points	Rank
Jules Mitchell	Laser	~~19~~; ~~STP~~	14	15	16	16	14	18	16	12	19	—N/a						140	16	Did not advance		
**Tiger Tyson**	Kites	2	3	3	3	3	~~4~~	2	3	2	2	2	3	~~6~~	~~7~~	3	3	34	2 **Q**	2	—N/a	2nd place, silver medalist(s)

== Swimming ==
Antigua and Barbuda qualified two male swimmers.

Key

- Note – Ranks given are for the entire round
- **NR** – National record
- **Q** – Qualified to the medal final
- **q** – Qualified to the non-medal final

Men

Athlete	Event	Heat		Final	
Athlete	Event	Time	Rank	Time	Rank
Stefano Mitchell	50 m freestyle	Did not start		—N/a	
Stefano Mitchell	100 m freestyle	52.86	28	Did not advance	
Noah Mascoll-Gomes	200 m freestyle	1:55.42	14 **q**	1:54.69	14
Noah Mascoll-Gomes	400 m freestyle	4:11.50	20	Did not advance	
Noah Mascoll-Gomes	100 m backstroke	Did not start		—N/a	
Noah Mascoll-Gomes	100 m butterfly	Did not start		—N/a	

== Tennis ==
Antigua and Barbuda qualified one male tennis player.

Men

Athlete	Event	Round of 64	Round of 32	Round of 16	Quarterfinal	Semifinal	Final / BM	
Athlete	Event	Opposition Result	Opposition Result	Opposition Result	Opposition Result	Opposition Result	Opposition Result	Rank
Jody Maginley	Singles	Bertran (DOM); **L** 6–4, 7–6	Did not advance					

== See also ==
- Antigua and Barbuda at the 2024 Summer Olympics
