= Dominica at the 2023 Pan American Games =

- IOC code: DMA
- NOC: Dominica Olympic Committee

in Santiago, Chile 20 October 2023 – 5 November 2023
- Competitors: 5 in 2 sports
- Flag bearer (opening): Delroy Charles
- Flag bearers (closing): Dennick Luke & Thea LaFond
- Medals Ranked =31st: Gold 0 Silver 0 Bronze 1 Total 1

Pan American Games appearances (overview)
- 1995; 1999; 2003; 2007; 2011; 2015; 2019; 2023

Dominica competed at the 2023 Pan American Games in Santiago, Chile from October 20 to November 5, 2023. This was Dominica's 8th appearance at the Pan American Games, having competed at every edition of the Games since 1995.

The Dominican team consisted of five athletes (four men and one woman) competing in two sports. Boxer Delroy Charles was the country's flagbearer during the opening ceremony. Meanwhile, track and field athletes Dennick Luke and Thea LaFond were the country's flagbearers during the closing ceremony.

Dominica won one bronze medal, a bronze by Thea LaFond in the women's triple jump track and field event.

== Medalists ==
The following Dominican competitors won medals at the games. In the by discipline sections below, medalists' names are bolded.

Medal	Name	Sport	Event	Date
Bronze	Thea LaFond	Athletics	Women's triple jump	November 2

== Competitors ==
The following is the list of number of competitors (per gender) participating at the games per sport/discipline.

Sport	Men	Women	Total
Athletics (track and field)	2	1	3
Boxing	2	0	2
Total	4	1	5

== Athletics (track and field) ==
Dominica qualified three athletes (two men and one woman).

Key

- Note–Ranks given for track events are within the athlete's heat only
- **Q** = Qualified for the next round
- **q** = Qualified for the next round as a fastest loser
- Bye = Athlete not required to compete in round

Track and road event

Athlete	Event	Semifinals		Final	
Athlete	Event	Result	Rank	Result	Rank
Dennick Luke	Men's 800 m	1:50.17	17	Did not advance	

Field events

Athlete	Event	Final	
Athlete	Event	Distance	Position
Tristan James	Men's long jump	7.03	10
**Thea LaFond**	Women's triple jump	14.25	3rd place, bronze medalist(s)

== Boxing ==
Dominica entered two male boxers.

Men

Athlete	Event	Round of 32	Round of 16	Quarterfinal	Semifinal	Final	
Athlete	Event	Opposition Result	Opposition Result	Opposition Result	Opposition Result	Opposition Result	Rank
Joshua Toussaint	–63.5 kg	Bye	Amaya (ARG); **L** RSC R2	Did not advance			
Delroy Charles	+92 kg	—N/a	Arzola (CUB); **L** WDR	Did not advance			

== See also ==
- Dominica at the 2024 Summer Olympics
