= Antigua and Barbuda at the 2015 Pan American Games =

- IOC code: ANT
- NOC: Antigua and Barbuda National Olympic Committee
- Website: antiguabarbudanoc.com

in Toronto, Canada 10–26 July 2015
- Competitors: 10 in 3 sports
- Flag bearer (opening): Daniel Bailey
- Flag bearer (closing): Miguel Francis
- Medals Ranked 25th: Gold 0 Silver 1 Bronze 0 Total 1

Pan American Games appearances (overview)
- 1979; 1983; 1987; 1991; 1995; 1999; 2003; 2007; 2011; 2015; 2019; 2023

Antigua and Barbuda competed at the 2015 Pan American Games in Toronto, Ontario, Canada from July 10 to 26, 2015. The Chef de mission of the team was Howard Everton Cornelius.

The Antigua and Barbuda team consisted of ten athletes across three sports. This marked an increase of three from the last edition of the games in 2011. Track and field athlete Daniel Bailey was the flagbearer for the team during the opening ceremony.

Priscilla Frederick, a high jumper won the country's only medal (silver), ranking the country 25th overall in the medal table.

== Competitors ==
The following table lists Antigua and Barbuda's delegation per sport and gender.

Sport	Men	Women	Total
Athletics	5	1	6
Cycling	1	1	2
Swimming	1	1	2
Total	7	3	10

== Medalists ==
The following competitors from Antigua and Barbuda won medals at the games. In the by discipline sections below, medalists' names are bolded.

Medal	Name	Sport	Event	Date
Silver	Priscilla Frederick	Athletics	Women's High Jump	July 22

**Medals by sport**
**Sport**	1st place, gold medalist(s)	2nd place, silver medalist(s)	3rd place, bronze medalist(s)	**Total**
Athletics	0	1	0	1
**Total**	**0**	**1**	**0**	**1**

**Medals by day**
**Day**	1st place, gold medalist(s)	2nd place, silver medalist(s)	3rd place, bronze medalist(s)	**Total**
July 22	0	1	0	1
**Total**	**0**	**1**	**0**	**1**

== Athletics ==
Antigua and Barbuda's team consisted of five athletes (four men and one woman). The team was cut in half after the Pan American Sports Organization had to pare down the number of athletes after double the original quota qualified.

Key

- Note – Ranks given for track events are for the entire round
- **Q** = Qualified for the next round
- **PR** = Pan American Record
- **DSQ** = Disqualified

Men

Athlete	Event	Heat		Semi Final		Final	
Athlete	Event	Time	Rank	Time	Rank	Time	Rank
Daniel Bailey	Men's 100m	10.16	12	**DSQ**		did not advance	
Miguel Francis	Men's 200m	20.21	3 **Q**	20.05	3 **Q**	20.20	6
Daniel Bailey; Miguel Francis; Cejhae Greene; Chavaughn Walsh; Jared Jarvis	Men's 4 × 100 m Relay	—N/a		38.14 **PR**, NR	1 **Q**	**DSQ**	

- Jarvis was named to the team but did not compete in either the heats or final.

Women

Athlete	Event	Final	
Athlete	Event	Distance	Rank
**Priscilla Frederick**	High Jump	1.91	2nd place, silver medalist(s)

== Cycling ==
Antigua and Barbuda has qualified one male cyclist, and later received a wildcard quota in the women's events.

=== Road ===
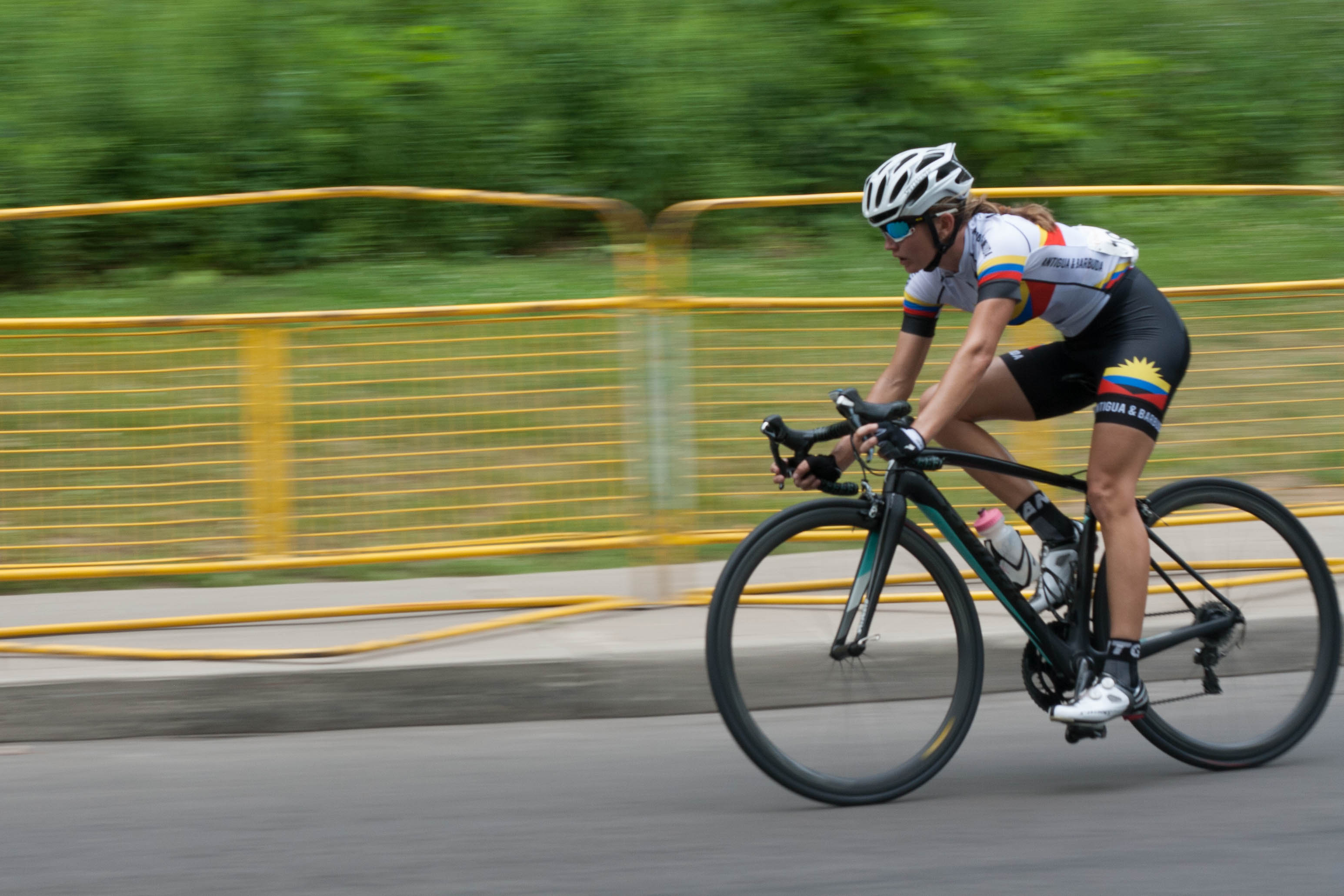
Tamiko Butler during the road race event.

Athlete	Event	Final	
Athlete	Event	Time	Rank
Andre Simon	Men's road race	DNF	
Andre Simon	Men's time trial	50:59.52	14
Tamiko Butler	Women's road race	2:07:56	27
Tamiko Butler	Women's time trial	30:19.17	12

== Swimming ==
Antigua and Barbuda received two universality spots (one male and one female).

Key

- Note – Ranks given are for the entire round

Athlete	Event	Heat		Final	
Athlete	Event	Time	Rank	Time	Rank
Noah Mascoll-Gomes	Men's 100 m freestyle	52.90	19	did not advance	
Noah Mascoll-Gomes	Men's 200 m freestyle	1:55.56	19	did not advance	
Noah Mascoll-Gomes	Men's 400 m freestyle	4:13.55	18	did not advance	
Samantha Roberts	Women's 50 m freestyle	27.91	24	did not advance	
Samantha Roberts	Women's 100 m freestyle	1:02.66	27	did not advance	
Samantha Roberts	Women's 200 m freestyle	2:17.25	20	did not advance	
