= Dominica at the 2019 Pan American Games =

- IOC code: DMA
- NOC: Dominica Olympic Committee

in Lima, Peru 26 July–11 August 2019
- Competitors: 2 in 1 sport
- Flag bearer: Brendan Williams (opening)
- Medals: Gold 0 Silver 0 Bronze 0 Total 0

Pan American Games appearances (overview)
- 1995; 1999; 2003; 2007; 2011; 2015; 2019; 2023

Dominica competed at the 2019 Pan American Games in Lima, Peru from July 26 to August 11, 2019.

The Dominican team consisted of just two athletes (one of each gender) competing in athletics (track and field). A total of five officials and coaches accompanied the team to the games.

During the opening ceremony of the games, Chef De Mission Brendan Williams carried the flag of the country as part of the parade of nations.

== Competitors ==
The following is the list of number of competitors (per gender) that participated at the games per sport/discipline.

Sport	Men	Women	Total
Athletics (track and field)	1	1	2
Total	1	1	2

== Athletics (track and field) ==
Dominica qualified two track and field athletes (one per gender). Dillon Simon, did not register a throw in his event, and thus was un-ranked during the shot put competition. On the other hand, triple jumper Thea LaFond finished in eighth place with a best jump of 13.70 metres, therefore registering the country's top result at the games.

Key

- Note–Ranks given for track events are for the entire round
- NM = No mark

Field events

Athlete	Event	Final	
Athlete	Event	Distance	Position
Dillon Simon	Men's shot put	NM	
Thea LaFond	Women's triple jump	13.70	8

== See also ==
- Dominica at the 2020 Summer Olympics
