= Priscilla Frederick =

American-born Antiguan high jumper

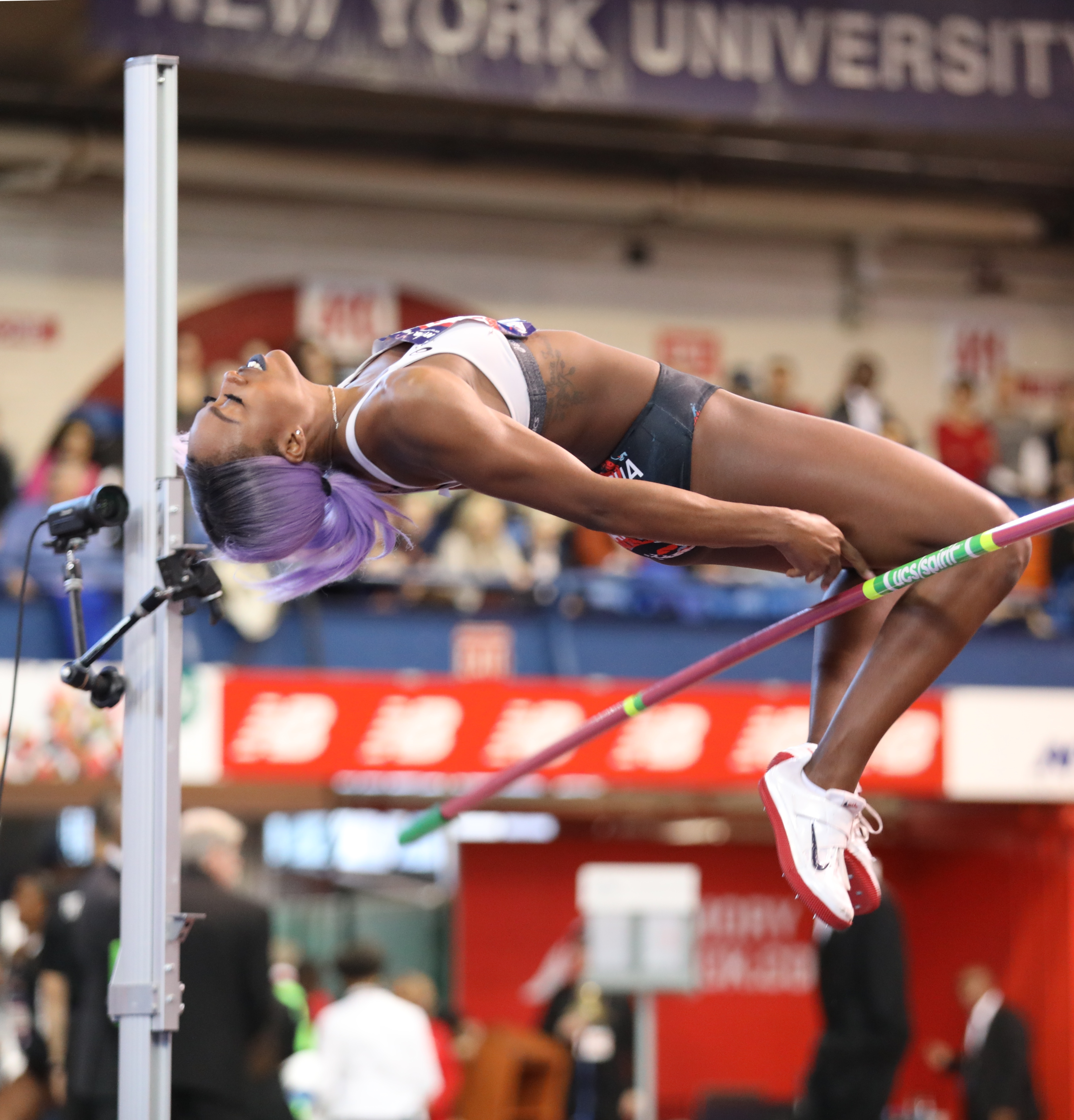
- Frederick in 2019

Personal information
- Full name: Priscilla Eve Frederick
- Born: 14 February 1989 (age 37) Queens, New York, U.S.
- Height: 1.83 m (6 ft 0 in)
- Weight: 70 kg (154 lb)

Sport
- Sport: Track and field
- Event: High jump
- College team: St. John's University
Medal record
Representing Antigua and Barbuda
Pan American Games
Silver medal – second place	2015 Toronto	High jump
Silver medal – second place	2019 Lima	High jump

Priscilla Eve Frederick (born 14 February 1989 in Queens, New York) is an American-Antiguan athlete who specialises in the high jump. She competed for the United States until 2012, when she switched to Antigua and Barbuda, the country of her father's birth. She was raised and resides in the Sicklerville section of Winslow Township, New Jersey.

Frederick placed seventh in the US Olympic Trials.

After beginning to compete internationally for Antigua and Barbuda, Frederick won a silver medal in high jump at the 2015 Pan American Games. She defended her medal at the 2019 Pan American Games in Lima. In both Pan-American Games, she finished second behind Saint Lucian high jumper Levern Spencer.

Frederick's personal bests for the high jump are 1.91 metres outdoors (Toronto 2015) and 1.90 metres indoors (Staten Island 2016). Both are national records.

Frederick began coaching at Princeton University in 2016.

== Personal life ==
Loomis is Catholic and has been vocal about her faith.

== Competition record ==
Year	Competition	Venue	Position	Event	Notes
Representing Antigua and Barbuda
2014	Commonwealth Games	Glasgow, United Kingdom	13th (q)	High jump	1.81 m
2014	Pan American Sports Festival	Mexico City, Mexico	4th	High jump	1.80 m
2014	Central American and Caribbean Games	Xalapa, Mexico	2nd	High jump	1.83 m
2015	Pan American Games	Toronto, Canada	2nd	High jump	1.91 m
2015	NACAC Championships	San José, Costa Rica	2nd	High jump	1.88 m
2015	World Championships	Beijing, China	22nd (q)	High jump	1.85 m
2016	Olympic Games	Rio de Janeiro, Brazil	28th (q)	High jump	1.89 m
2018	Commonwealth Games	Gold Coast, Australia	5th	High jump	1.87 m
2019	Pan American Games	Lima, Peru	2nd	High jump	1.87 m
