= Athletics at the 2011 Pan American Games – Men's long jump =

Men's long jump at the 2011 Pan American Games
- Venue: Telmex Athletics Stadium
- Dates: October 24 – October 25
- Competitors: 22 from 18 nations

Medalists
Gold medal	Daniel Pineda	Chile
Silver medal	David Registe	Dominica
Bronze medal	Jeremy Hicks	United States

The men's long jump event of the athletics events at the 2011 Pan American Games was held between the 24 and 25 of October at the Telmex Athletics Stadium. The defending Pan American Games champion is Irving Saladino of the Panama.

On November 9, 2011 the winner Victor Castillo of Venezuela was disqualified after testing positive for methylhexaneamine.

== Records ==
Prior to this competition, the existing world and Pan American Games records were as follows:

World record	Mike Powell (USA)	8.95	Tokyo, Japan	August 30, 1991
Pan American Games record	Carl Lewis (USA)	8.75	Indianapolis, United States	August 16, 1987

== Qualification ==
Each National Olympic Committee (NOC) was able to enter up to two entrants providing they had met the minimum standard (7.65) in the qualifying period (January 1, 2010 to September 14, 2011).

== Schedule ==
Date	Time	Round
October 24, 2011	15:25	Qualification
October 25, 2011	17:05	Final

== Results ==
All distances shown are in meters:centimeters

KEY:	q	Fastest non-qualifiers	Q	Qualified	NR	National record	PB	Personal best	SB	Seasonal best

=== Qualification ===
Qualification was held on October 24. Qualifying Performance 7.80 (Q) or at least 12 best performers (q) advance to the final.

Rank	Group	Athlete	Nationality	#1	#2	#3	Result	Notes
1	B	David Registe	Dominica	7.53	7.60	7.88	7.88	Q
2	B	Collister Fahie	Virgin Islands	7.87			7.87	Q
3	B	Jorge McFarlane	Peru	7.83			7.83	Q
4	B	Emiliano Lasa	Uruguay	7.81			7.81	Q, PB
5	A	Daniel Pineda	Chile	7.77	7.70	x	7.77	q
6	A	Víctor Castillo	Venezuela	7.30	7.75	–	7.75	q
7	B	Rudon Bastian	Bahamas	7.55	7.69	7.73	7.73	q, SB
8	A	Marcos Amalbert	Puerto Rico	7.71	7.64	–	7.71	q
9	B	Randall Flimmons	United States	7.69	7.67	7.52	7.69	q
10	A	Hugo Chila	Ecuador	7.51	7.31	7.63	7.63	q
11	B	Carl Morgan	Cayman Islands	7.52	7.54	7.42	7.54	q
12	A	Jeremy Hicks	United States	x	x	7.53	7.53	q
13	A	Rogério Bispo	Brazil	7.51	7.48	7.48	7.51	
14	B	Herbert McGregor	Jamaica	7.46	7.06	7.24	7.46	
15	A	Vicente Rios	Mexico	7.38	x	7.42	7.42	
16	B	Kenneth Brackett	Belize	6.61	7.32	x	7.32	PB
17	A	Leon Hunt	Virgin Islands	7.01	7.12	7.31	7.31	
18	B	Kessel Campbell	Honduras	x	7.29	x	7.29	
19	B	Miguel Hernández	Mexico	x	7.16	7.23	7.23	
20	A	Júnior Díaz	Cuba	7.09	7.21	7.07	7.21	
21	A	Jevonte Croal	British Virgin Islands	x	6.70	6.57	6.70	
22	A	Carlos Morgan	Cayman Islands	x	6.65	x	6.65	

=== Final ===
The final was held on October 25.

Rank	Athlete	Nationality	#1	#2	#3	#4	#5	#6	Result	Notes
1st place, gold medalist(s)	Daniel Pineda	Chile	7.59	x	x	7.97	x	7.49	7.97	
2nd place, silver medalist(s)	David Registe	Dominica	7.27	7.89	7.70	7.75	7.52	7.68	7.89	
3rd place, bronze medalist(s)	Jeremy Hicks	United States	7.55	7.83	7.59	7.44	7.79	7.66	7.83	
4	Jorge McFarlane	Peru	7.56	x	x	7.78	x	7.70	7.78	
5	Emiliano Lasa	Uruguay	7.73	7.58	7.49	7.40	7.43	7.47	7.73	
6	Randall Flimmons	United States	7.71	x	x	x	7.68	7.58	7.71	
7	Rudon Bastian	Bahamas	7.62	7.32	7.49	x	7.28	7.21	7.62	
8	Collister Fahie	Virgin Islands	x	x	7.46				7.46	
9	Carl Morgan	Cayman Islands	x	7.38	6.97				7.38	
10	Hugo Chila	Ecuador	7.33	7.14	x				7.33	
11	Marcos Amalbert	Puerto Rico	x	7.31	x				7.31	
–	Víctor Castillo	Venezuela	8.05	x	x	7.74	x	–	–	DSQ
