= Víctor Castillo =

Venezuelan long jumper (born 1981)

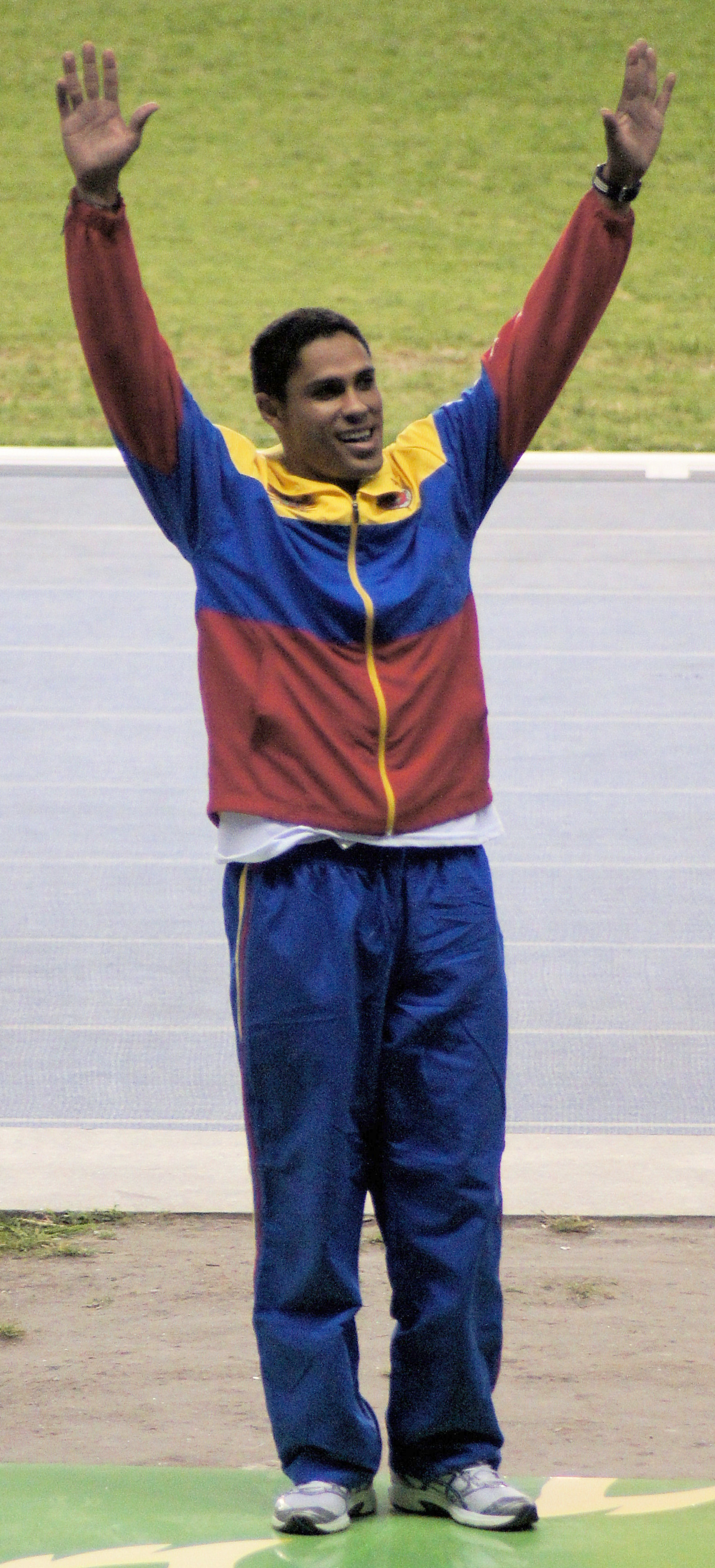
- Castillo at the 2011 Military World Games

Personal information
- Full name: Víctor Manuel Castillo Petit
- Born: June 8, 1981 (age 45) San Joaquín, Carabobo, Venezuela
- Height: 1.80 m (5 ft 11 in)
- Weight: 79 kg (174 lb)

Sport
- Sport: Athletics
- Club: NAU Lumberjacks (USA)
Medal record
Representing Venezuela
Pan American Games
Bronze medal – third place	2003 Santo Domingo	Long jump
Disqualified	2011 Guadalajara	Long jump
Bolivarian Games
Gold medal – first place	2009 Sucre	Long jump 8.25m
Silver medal – second place	2009 Sucre	4×100 m
Military World Games
Bronze medal – third place	2011 Rio de Janeiro	Long jump
South American Championships
Gold medal – first place	2003 Barquisimeto	Long jump
CAC Junior Championships (U20)
Bronze medal – third place	2000 San Juan	Long jump
- Updated on 29 June 2013

Víctor Manuel Castillo Petit (born 8 June 1981) is a Venezuelan track and field athlete who specialises in the long jump. His personal best jump is 8.34 metres, a Venezuelan record achieved in May 2004 in Cochabamba.

He won the South American junior title in 2000 and rose to become the South American Champion in 2003 on home soil. At the 2003 Pan American Games, he took the bronze medal. Castillo appeared at the World Championships in Athletics that year and later represented his country at the 2004 Summer Olympics.

Won the long jump title at the Bolivarian Games. He was the bronze medallist at the 2011 Military World Games then participated at the 2011 Pan American Games.

Tested positive for banned substance Dimetilexaniamine in 2011, the substance found in his test was fearly new added to the WADA list, he took from a pre-workout supplement doping suspension.

== Career ==
His first international outing came at the 1998 South American Junior Championships in Athletics, where he came sixth in the long jump and was part of Venezuela's silver medal-winning 4×100 metres relay team. He returned to win the long jump gold medal at the 2000 event, beating Brazil's Thiago Dias. At the more competitive 2000 Central American and Caribbean Junior Championships in Athletics he came third with a wind-assisted mark of 7.77 m, finishing behind Leevan Sands of the Bahamas. The 2000 World Junior Championships in Athletics was held in Chile that year and Castillo made his first world-level appearance and placed fourth, just outside the medal positions.

Castillo gained eligibility to compete for the Northern Arizona University Lumberjacks: he broke the school record for the long jump and was fourth at the Drake Relays in 2003. He achieved his first success at senior level for Venezuela that year. He won the long jump title at the 2003 South American Championships in Athletics held in Barquisimeto, was fourth at the CAC Championships, and jumped his best of the year at the Pan American Games, taking the bronze medal with a mark of 7.98 m. His senior global debut followed at the 2003 World Championships in Athletics and he finished 11th in his qualifying round.

Castillo cleared eight metres twice in May 2004, first with a jump of 8.03 m in Mexico City and then a personal best and Venezuelan national record of 8.34 m in Cochabamba. He travelled to Europe and competed at top level meets, including Athletissima, before going on to finish as runner-up at the 2004 Ibero-American Championships in Athletics behind Spain's Joan Lino Martínez. He made his first appearance at the Olympics at the 2004 Athens Games, where he finished eighth in his qualifier with a jump of 7.98 m but did not make the final. He represented the NAU Lumberjacks in the 2005 indoor season and broke two national indoor records, running 6.76 seconds for the 60 metres and clearing 8.00 m for the long jump.

In 2006 Castillo was found guilty of using furosemide, a banned diuretic and so-called masking agent. The sample containing the banned substance was delivered on 27 March 2006 in an out-of-competition test. He received an IAAF suspension from June 2006 to June 2008.

Following the expiration of his ban, he returned to competition in the 2009 season. He won the gold medal at the 2009 Bolivarian Games in November, jumping a season's best of 8.25 m, and also helped Venezuela's 4×100 metres relay team to a silver medal. He made few appearances in 2010, but returned to full competition the year after. He ran a 200 metres personal best of 21.13 seconds in May at the national championships, placing third in the sprint after winning the long jump title. A jump of 7.72 m brought him fourth place at the 2011 South American Championships in Athletics and a month later he represented Venezuela at the 2011 Military World Games in Rio de Janeiro, where he took the bronze medal with a clearance of 7.81 m. With the wind right on the permissible limit, he had a jump of 8.03 m at the 2011 ALBA Games – a mark which earned him the gold medal. His season came to a peak at the 2011 Pan American Games in Guadalajara as he jumped 8.05 m (his third best ever) to secure the gold medal, becoming the second Venezuelan man to win an athletics gold at the competition (following Rafael Romero's 200 m win in 1963). Castillo came back at age 35 to jump 7.52m during the 2016 indoor season at a local meet in Elche, Spain.

The Venezuelan Olympic Committee.

== Personal bests ==
Outdoor

- 100 metres: 10.44 s (wind: -1.1 m/s) – (Venezuela) Caracas, 9 October 2009
- 200 metres: 21.22 s (wind: +0.3 m/s) – (Venezuela) Caracas, 7 May 2011
- Long jump: 8.34 m A (wind: -1.2 m/s) – (Bolivia) Cochabamba, 30 May 2004
- Triple jump: 15.66 m (wind: +0.2 m/s) – (United States) Tempe, Arizona, 4 May 2003

Indoor

- 60 metres: 6.76 m A – (United States) Flagstaff, Arizona, 19 February 2005
- Long jump: 8.00 m A – (United States) Flagstaff, Arizona, 5 February 2005

== Achievements ==
Year	Competition	Venue	Position	Event	Notes
Representing Venezuela
1998	South American Junior Championships	Córdoba, Argentina	4th (h)	110 m hurdles	16.37 s (wind: +1.2 m/s)
1998	South American Junior Championships	Córdoba, Argentina	6th	Long jump	6.93 m
1998	South American Junior Championships	Córdoba, Argentina	2nd	4 × 100 m relay	41.41 s
2000	Central American and Caribbean Junior Championships (U-20)	San Juan, Puerto Rico	3rd	Long jump	7.77 m w (wind: +2.8 m/s)
2000	South American Junior Championships	São Leopoldo, Brazil	1st	Long jump	7.70 m
2000	World Junior Championships	Santiago, Chile	4th	Long jump	7.66 m (wind: +0.6 m/s)
2003	South American Championships	Barquisimeto, Venezuela	1st	Long jump	7.78 m (wind: +0.7 m/s)
2003	Central American and Caribbean Championships	St. George's, Grenada	4th	Long jump	7.60 m (wind: +0.4 m/s)
2003	Pan American Games	Santo Domingo, Dominican Republic	3rd	Long jump	7.98 m (wind: +1.1 m/s)
2003	World Championships	Saint-Denis, France	11th (q)	Long jump	7.71 m (wind: +0.3 m/s)
2004	Ibero-American Championships	Huelva, Spain	2nd	Long jump	7.95 m (wind: +1.4 m/s)
2004	Olympic Games	Athens, Greece	8th (qualifiers)	Long jump	7.98 m (wind: +0.6 m/s)
2009	Bolivarian Games	Sucre, Bolivia	1st	Long jump	8.25m GR A (wind: -0.6 m/s)
2009	Bolivarian Games	Sucre, Bolivia	2nd	4 × 100 m relay	39.73 A
2011	South American Championships	Buenos Aires, Argentina	4th	Long jump	7.72m
2011	World Military Track & Field Championships	Rio de Janeiro, Brazil	3rd	Long jump	7.81 m (wind: +1.3 m/s)
2011	ALBA Games	Barquisimeto, Venezuela	1st	Long jump	8.03 m (wind: +2.0 m/s)
2011	Pan American Games	Guadalajara, Mexico	1st (DQ)	Long jump	

== See also ==
- List of doping cases in athletics
