= Athletics at the 2015 Pan American Games – Women's high jump =

Women's high jump at the 2015 Pan American Games
- Venue: CIBC Pan Am and Parapan Am Athletics Stadium
- Dates: July 22
- Competitors: 16 from 11 nations
- Winning height: 1.94

Medalists
| Gold medal | Levern Spencer | Saint Lucia |
| Silver medal | Priscilla Frederick | Antigua and Barbuda |
| Bronze medal | Akela Jones | Barbados |

The women's high jump competition of the athletics events at the 2015 Pan American Games took place on July 22 at the CIBC Pan Am and Parapan Am Athletics Stadium. The defending Pan American Games champion is Lesyani Mayor of Cuba.

== Records ==
Prior to this competition, the existing world and Pan American Games records were as follows:

| World record | Stefka Kostadinova (BUL) | 2.09 | Rome, Italy | August 30, 1987 |
| Pan American Games record | Coleen Sommer (USA) | 1.96 | Indianapolis, United States | August 13, 1987 |

== Qualification ==
Each National Olympic Committee (NOC) was able to enter up to two entrants providing they had met the minimum standard (1.78) in the qualifying period (January 1, 2014 to June 28, 2015).

== Schedule ==
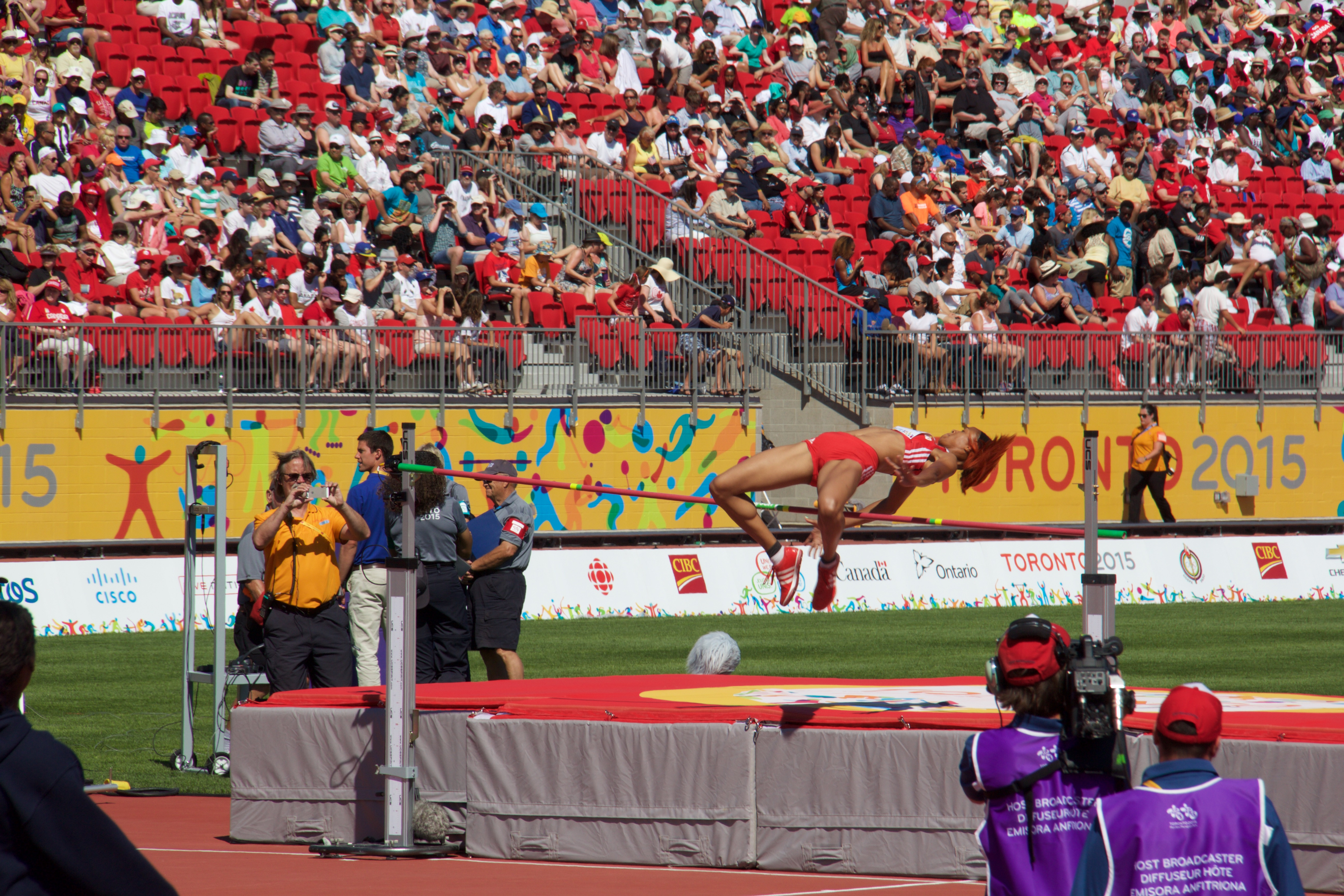
The Women's high jump competition at the 2015 Pan American Games in Toronto, Canada

| Date | Time | Round |
|---|---|---|
| July 22, 2015 | 10:05 | Final |

== Results ==
All results shown are in meters.

| KEY: | q | Best non-qualifiers | Q | Qualified | NR | National record | PB | Personal best | SB | Seasonal best | DQ | Disqualified |

=== Final ===
| Rank | Name | Nationality | 1.70 | 1.75 | 1.80 | 1.85 | 1.88 | 1.91 | 1.94 | Mark | Notes |
|---|---|---|---|---|---|---|---|---|---|---|---|
| 1st place, gold medalist(s) | Levern Spencer | Saint Lucia | – | – | o | o | o | o | xxo | 1.94 | |
| 2nd place, silver medalist(s) | Priscilla Frederick | Antigua and Barbuda | – | o | o | o | o | xo | xxx | 1.91 | PB |
| 3rd place, bronze medalist(s) | Akela Jones | Barbados | – | xo | xo | o | o | xxo | xxx | 1.91 | PB |
| 4 | Maya Pressley | United States | – | o | o | o | o | xxx | | 1.88 | SB |
| 5 | Jeanelle Scheper | Saint Lucia | – | – | o | xxo | xo | xxx | | 1.88 | |
| 6 | Kimberly Williamson | Jamaica | – | o | xo | xo | xxo | xxx | | 1.88 | |
| 7 | Alyxandria Treasure | Canada | – | o | o | xo | xxx | | | 1.85 | |
| 8 | Ximena Esquivel | Mexico | o | o | o | xxx | | | | 1.80 | |
| 9 | Saniel Atkinson-Grier | Jamaica | o | o | xo | xxx | | | | 1.80 | |
| 9 | Emma Kimoto | Canada | o | o | xo | xxx | | | | 1.80 | |
| 11 | Ana Paula de Oliveira | Brazil | o | o | xxo | xxx | | | | 1.80 | |
| 11 | Elizabeth Patterson | United States | – | o | xxo | xxx | | | | 1,80 | |
| 13 | Thea LaFond | Dominica | o | xxo | xxo | xxx | | | | 1.80 | |
| 14 | Monica de Freitas | Brazil | o | o | xxx | | | | | 1.75 | |
| 15 | Deandra Daniel | Trinidad and Tobago | xo | o | xxx | | | | | 1.75 | |
| 16 | Kashany Rios | Panama | xxo | xxx | | | | | | 1.70 | |
