= Daniel Pineda (athlete) =

Chilean long jumper

Personal information
- Nationality: Chile
- Born: 19 September 1985 (age 40) Talcahuano, Bío Bío Region, Chile
- Height: 1.78 m (5 ft 10 in)
- Weight: 72 kg (159 lb)

Sport
- Sport: Athletics
Medal record
Men's athletics
Representing Chile
Pan American Games
Gold medal – first place	2011 Guadalajara	Long jump
South American Championships
Bronze medal – third place	2011 Buenos Aires	Long jump
South American Youth Championships
Gold medal – first place	2002 Asunción	Long jump
Silver medal – second place	2002 Asunción	4x100 m relay
Silver medal – second place	2002 Asunción	1000 m Medley relay
- Updated on 14 May 2013

Daniel Pineda Contreras (born 19 September 1985) is a Chilean track and field athlete who competes in the long jump. He holds the Chilean national record in the event with his personal best jump of eight metres. In 2011 he was third at the South American Championships in Athletics, then won the gold medal at the 2011 Pan American Games after the original winner was disqualified.

== Biography ==
Born in Talcahuano, Concepción, Pineda won his first international long jumping title at the 2002 South American Youth Championships in Athletics. In addition to his long jump gold medal, he also won silver medals in the 4×100 metres relay and sprint medley relay, as well as placing fifth individually over 100 metres.

After a break from athletics, he moved to the Chilean capital to train with Club Atlético Santiago in 2006 and appeared at the top level of senior competition in 2007. He jumped a personal best of 7.59 m in La Paz in June and a week later he placed eighth in the long jump at the 2007 South American Championships, where he was also a relay runner for Chile in both the 100 m and 400 m events. He ended the year by winning the Chilean long jump title in Santiago de Chile. He retained it the following season, in which he also ran a 100 m best of 10.63 seconds and finished tenth at the 2008 Ibero-American Championships in Athletics. He only competed in Santiago in 2010, but still managed to win at the Chilean Championships.

Pineda made much progression in the 2010 season: he had a jump of 7.76 m in Medellín in April then broke the Chilean record at the national championships the following month, winning his fourth straight title with a clearance of 7.97 m. At the end of May, he edged this a centimetre further in La Paz. He did not reach this form at the 2010 Ibero-American Championships in Athletics as he took tenth place for a second time running with a best jump of 7.33 m. Pineda was a guest at the Colombian championships in 2011 and improved his national mark to eight metres for the first time. Nine years after his victory at youth level, he won his first senior medal at the 2011 South American Championships in Athletics, taking the bronze medal. He made his debut at a world level event at the 2011 Summer Universiade and came twelfth in the long jump.

At the 2011 Pan American Games in Guadalajara he delivered one of the best performances of his career: he jumped 7.97 m in the final to finish runner-up behind Venezuela's Víctor Castillo. However, Pineda was upgraded from the silver medal to the gold as Castillo tested positive for banned substances. He currently works as a sports teacher and athletics trainer at Colegio San Benito, in Santiago.

== Doping ban ==
Pineda was given a two-year ban for "tampering". The ban ran from 5 March 2013 to 4 March 2015.

== Achievements ==
Year	Competition	Venue	Position	Event	Notes
Representing Chile
2002	South American Youth Championships	Asunción, Paraguay	5th	100 m	11.37 s (-1.5 m/s)
2002	South American Youth Championships	Asunción, Paraguay	1st	Long jump	7.28 m w
2002	South American Youth Championships	Asunción, Paraguay	2nd	4 × 100 m relay	41.4 s
2002	South American Youth Championships	Asunción, Paraguay	2nd	Medley relay	1:57.04 min
2006	South American U23 Championships / South American Games	Buenos Aires, Argentina	9th	Long jump	5.80 m (+2.6 m/s) w
2007	South American Championships	São Paulo, Brazil	7th	4 × 100 m relay	40.82 s
2007	South American Championships	São Paulo, Brazil	6th	4 × 400 m relay	3:15.17 min
2007	South American Championships	São Paulo, Brazil	8th	Long jump	7.11 m
2008	Ibero-American Championships	Iquique, Chile	–	4 × 100 m relay	DNF
2008	Ibero-American Championships	Iquique, Chile	10th	Long jump	6.97 m
2010	Ibero-American Championships	San Fernando, Spain	10th	Long jump	7.33 m
2011	South American Championships	Buenos Aires, Argentina	3rd	Long jump	7.82 m
2011	Universiade	Shenzhen, China	12th	Long jump	7.59 m
2011	Pan American Games	Guadalajara, Mexico	4th (h)	4 × 100 m relay	39.68 s
2011	Pan American Games	Guadalajara, Mexico	1st	Long jump	7.97 m
2013	Universiade	Kazan, Russia	13th (q)	Long jump	7.56 m (w)
2014	South American Games	Santiago, Chile	4th	Long jump	7.82 m
2015	South American Championships	Lima, Peru	5th	Long jump	7.52 m w (+2.4 m/s
2017	South American Championships	Asunción, Paraguay	3rd	Long jump	7.87 m (w)
2017	Bolivarian Games	Santa Marta, Colombia	10th	Long jump	6.95 m
2018	South American Games	Cochabamba, Bolivia	4th	Long jump	7.81 m
2018	Ibero-American Championships	Trujillo, Peru	2nd	Long jump	7.81 m
2019	South American Championships	Lima, Peru	6th	Long jump	7.29 m
2019	Pan American Games	Lima, Peru	13th	Long jump	7.05 m
2020	South American Indoor Championships	Cochabamba, Bolivia	5th	Long jump	7.62 m
2021	South American Championships	Guayaquil, Ecuador	8th	Long jump	7.62 m (w)
