= David Registe =

Dominican long jumper (born 1988)

Personal information
- Born: 2 May 1988 (age 38) Palmer, Alaska, United States
- Height: 1.80 m (5 ft 11 in)
- Weight: 80 kg (176 lb)

Sport
- Country: Dominica
- Sport: Athletics
- Event: Long jump
Medal record
Representing Dominica
Pan American Games
Silver medal – second place	2011 Guadalajara	Long jump
Central American and Caribbean Games
Gold medal – first place	2014 Veracruz	Long jump
- Updated on 24 January 2015

David Registe (born 2 May 1988) is an American-born athlete representing Dominica in the long jump. He won the silver at the 2011 Pan American Games. Registe has a dual citizenship with the United States. His Dominica-born parents emigrated to Alaska in 1976.

His personal best in the long jump is 8.29 metres, set at Azusa Pacific University in 2015 winning the Brian Clay Invitational.

== Competition record ==
Year	Competition	Venue	Position	Event	Notes
Representing Dominica
2011	Central American and Caribbean Championships	Mayagüez, Puerto Rico	6th	Long jump	7.38 m
2011	Pan American Games	Guadalajara, Mexico	2nd	Long jump	7.89 m
2013	Central American and Caribbean Championships	Morelia, Mexico	10th	Long jump	7.02 m
2014	Commonwealth Games	Glasgow, United Kingdom	10th	Long jump	7.52 m
2014	Pan American Sports Festival	Mexico City, Mexico	1st	Long jump	8.06m A (wind: +1.8 m/s)
2014	Central American and Caribbean Games	Veracruz, Mexico	1st	Long jump	7.79 m
2015	Pan American Games	Toronto, Canada	17th (q)	Long jump	7.02 m (w)
2018	Commonwealth Games	Gold Coast, Australia	15th (q)	Long jump	7.59 m

== Personal bests ==
- 100 metres – 10.68 (+0.1 m/s) (Salem 2011)
- 200 metres – 21.44 (-1.0 m/s) (Walnut 2011)
- Long jump – 8.29 (+3.0 m/s) (Azusa Pacific 2015)
