= 2024 African Championships in Athletics – Women's triple jump =

Women's triple jump at the 2024 African Championships in Athletics
- Venue: Japoma Stadium
- Location: Douala, Cameroon
- Dates: 26 June
- Competitors: 11 from 7 nations
- Winning distance: 14.06 m

Medalists
gold medal	Hugues Fabrice Zango	Senegal
silver medal	Chengetayi Mapaya	Cameroon
bronze medal	Véronique Kossenda Rey	Cameroon

The women's triple jump event at the 2024 African Championships in Athletics was held on 26 June in Douala, Cameroon.

== Records ==
Records before the 2024 African Athletics Championships
Record	Athlete (nation)	Distance (m)	Location	Date
World record	Yulimar Rojas (VEN)	15.74	Belgrade, Serbia	20 March 2022
African record	Françoise Mbango Etone (CMR)	15.39	Beijing, China	17 August 2008
Championship record	Françoise Mbango Etone (CMR)	14.95	Radès, Tunisia	6 August 2002
World leading	Thea Lafond (DMA)	15.01	Glasgow, United Kingdom	3 March 2024
African leading	Saly Sarr (SEN)	14.18	Nice, France	15 June 2024

== Results ==
Rank	Athlete	Nationality	#1	#2	#3	#4	#5	#6	Result	Notes
1st place, gold medalist(s)	Saly Sarr	Senegal	12.14	14.06	x	13.72	13.63	13.87	14.06	
2nd place, silver medalist(s)	Anne-Suzanna Fosther-Katta	Cameroon	13.26	13.43	13.45	x	12.81	x	13.45	
3rd place, bronze medalist(s)	Véronique Kossenda Rey	Cameroon	13.02	13.34	13.35	12.88	13.06	13.27	13.35	
4	Liliane Potiron	Mauritius	x	x	13.32	13.20	x	x	13.32	
5	Zinzi Xulu	South Africa	13.05	x	x	12.56	13.25	13.14	13.25	
6	Karmen Fouché	South Africa	x	12.87	12.68	12.76	12.38	12.62	12.87	
7	Amelia Armando Pinga	Mozambique	12.67	12.75	12.40	12.50	x	12.84	12.84	
8	Fayza Issaka Abdou Kerim	Togo	12.38	12.61	12.10	12.29	12.54	12.22	12.61	
9	Justice Tonno Ondobo	Cameroon	12.57	12.33	12.14				12.57	
10	Pwoch Omod	Ethiopia	x	12.16	12.29				12.29	
11	Ajulu Adola	Ethiopia	11.30	11.67	x				11.67	

== See also ==
- Athletics at the 2023 African Games – Women's triple jump
