= 2026 Herculis =

Athletics meeting in Monaco

- Dates: 10 July 2026
- Host city: Monaco
- Venue: Stade Louis II
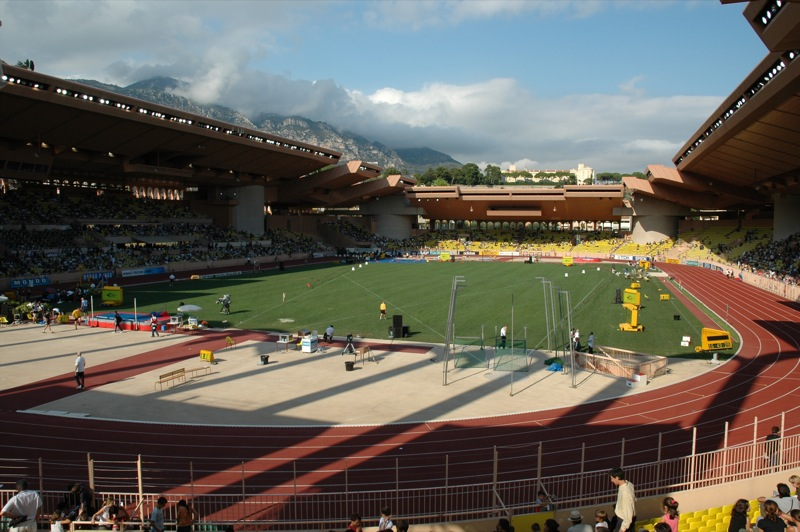
- Level: 2026 Diamond League

The 2026 Herculis was the 40th edition of the annual outdoor track and field meeting in Monaco. Held on 10 July at Stade Louis II, it was the tenth leg of the 2026 Diamond League – the highest level international track and field circuit.

== Diamond+ events results ==
=== Men's ===
100 Metres
Place	Athlete	Nation	Time	Points	Notes
1st place, gold medalist(s)	Oblique Seville	Jamaica	9.88	8	
2nd place, silver medalist(s)	Jordan Anthony	United States	9.92	7	
3rd place, bronze medalist(s)	Emmanuel Eseme	Cameroon	10.00	6	
4	Owen Ansah	Germany	10.01	5	
5	Letsile Tebogo	Botswana	10.04	4	
6	Ronal Longa	Colombia	10.05	3	
7	Sam Blaskowski	United States	10.06	2	
8	Bradley Nkoana	South Africa	10.06	1	
			Wind: (+0.2 m/s)		

400 Metres
Place	Athlete	Nation	Time	Points	Notes
1st place, gold medalist(s)	Collen Kebinatshipi	Botswana	43.44	8	DLR, NR
2nd place, silver medalist(s)	Jacory Patterson	United States	43.96	7	SB
3rd place, bronze medalist(s)	Rai Benjamin	United States	44.13	6	
4	Matthew Hudson-Smith	Great Britain	44.22	5	
5	Zakithi Nene	South Africa	44.24	4	
6	Jereem Richards	Trinidad and Tobago	44.44	3	SB
7	Attila Molnár	Hungary	44.47	2	NR
8	Muhammad Abdallah Kounta	France	44.57	1	PB

1000 Metres
Place	Athlete	Nation	Time	Points	Notes
1st place, gold medalist(s)	Emmanuel Wanyonyi	Kenya	2:11.83	8	WR
2nd place, silver medalist(s)	Jake Wightman	Great Britain	2:12.77	7	PB
3rd place, bronze medalist(s)	Djamel Sedjati	Algeria	2:13.94	6	PB
4	Azeddine Habz	France	2:14.02	5	PB
5	Ben Pattison	Great Britain	2:14.11	4	PB
6	Gabriel Tual	France	2:14.97	3	PB
7	Ko Ochiai	Japan	2:15.24	2	NR
8	Bryce Hoppel	United States	2:15.80	1	PB
9	Daniel Williams	Australia	2:16.41		
10	Mohamed Attaoui	Spain	2:18.75		
—	Patryk Sieradzki	Poland	DNF		
—	Louey Ouerrat	France	DNF		

Long jump
Place	Athlete	Nation	Distance	Points	Notes
1st place, gold medalist(s)	Miltiadis Tentoglou	Greece	8.61 m (±0.0 m/s)	8	MR, WL
2nd place, silver medalist(s)	Wayne Pinnock	Jamaica	8.39 m (+0.3 m/s)	7	SB
3rd place, bronze medalist(s)	Jorge A. Hodelín	Cuba	8.38 m (+0.5 m/s)	6	
4	Bozhidar Sarâboyukov	Bulgaria	8.36 m (−0.7 m/s)	5	
5	Simon Ehammer	Switzerland	8.32 m (+0.9 m/s)	4	
6	Gerson Baldé	Portugal	8.20 m (−0.6 m/s)	3	
7	Tajay Gayle	Jamaica	8.04 m (−0.4 m/s)	2	
8	Mattia Furlani	Italy	8.01 m (+0.6 m/s)	1	

=== Women's ===
200 Metres
Place	Athlete	Nation	Time	Points	Notes
1st place, gold medalist(s)	Julien Alfred	Saint Lucia	21.51	8	MR, NR, WL
2nd place, silver medalist(s)	Adaejah Hodge	British Virgin Islands	21.76	7	
3rd place, bronze medalist(s)	Gabby Thomas	United States	21.84	6	
4	Kayla White	United States	22.04	5	SB
5	Cambrea Sturgis	United States	22.40	4	
6	Anavia Battle	United States	22.42	3	
7	Fabienne Hoenke	Switzerland	22.50	2	PB
			Wind: (+0.9 m/s)		

400 Metres
Place	Athlete	Nation	Time	Points	Notes
1st place, gold medalist(s)	Marileidy Paulino	Dominican Republic	48.67	8	MR
2nd place, silver medalist(s)	Aaliyah Butler	United States	48.84	7	PB
3rd place, bronze medalist(s)	Lurdes Gloria Manuel	Czech Republic	49.44	6	
4	Nickisha Pryce	Jamaica	49.56	5	SB
5	Lieke Klaver	Netherlands	49.58	4	=PB
6	Roxana Gómez	Cuba	50.37	3	
7	Bassant Hemida	Egypt	50.56	2	
8	Jasmine Jones	United States	51.09	1	PB

3000 Metres
Place	Athlete	Nation	Time	Points	Notes
1st place, gold medalist(s)	Agnes Jebet Ngetich	Kenya	8:08.95	8	MR, WL, PB
2nd place, silver medalist(s)	Aleshign Baweke	Ethiopia	8:23.81	7	PB
3rd place, bronze medalist(s)	Senayet Getachew	Ethiopia	8:24.02	6	PB
4	Faith Kipyegon	Kenya	8:24.21	5	SB
5	Freweyni Hailu	Ethiopia	8:25.77	4	
6	Aynadis Mebratu	Ethiopia	8:27.15	3	PB
7	Mizan Alem	Ethiopia	8:27.99	2	PB
8	Cassandre Beaugrand	France	8:32.86	1	NR
9	Francine Niyomukunzi	Burundi	8:33.27		PB
10	Yenenesh Shimeket	Ethiopia	8:34.25		SB
11	Jana Van Lent	Belgium	8:36.14		NR
12	Bernesh Dessie	Ethiopia	8:37.02		SB
13	Nozomi Tanaka	Japan	8:37.85		SB
14	Birke Haylom	Ethiopia	8:40.90		SB
—	Vera Bertemes-Hoffmann	Luxembourg	DNF		PM
—	Jessica Hull	Australia	DNF		PM

100 Metres hurdles
Place	Athlete	Nation	Time	Points	Notes
1st place, gold medalist(s)	Masai Russell	United States	12.20	8	MR
2nd place, silver medalist(s)	Alaysha Johnson	United States	12.38	7	SB
3rd place, bronze medalist(s)	Nadine Visser	Netherlands	12.49	6	
4	Pia Skrzyszowska	Poland	12.54	5	
5	Rayniah Jones	United States	12.54	4	
6	Demisha Roswell	Jamaica	12.56	3	
7	Sacha Alessandrini	France	12.78	2	
8	Aaliyah McCormick	United States	13.13	1	
			Wind: (−0.4 m/s)		

== Diamond events results ==
=== Men's ===
5000 Metres
Place	Athlete	Nation	Time	Points	Notes
1st place, gold medalist(s)	Dominic Lokinyomo Lobalu	Switzerland	12:52.54	8	SB
2nd place, silver medalist(s)	Graham Blanks	United States	12:52.60	7	
3rd place, bronze medalist(s)	Birhanu Balew	Bahrain	12:52.91	6	
4	Jacob Krop	Kenya	12:53.71	5	SB
5	Cornelius Kemboi	Kenya	12:57.36	4	
6	Biniam Mehary	Ethiopia	12:58.37	3	
7	Etienne Daguinos	France	13:01.92	2	SB
8	Khairi Bejiga	Ethiopia	13:07.06	1	
9	Abdihamid Nur	United States	13:09.49		
10	Isaac Kimeli	Belgium	13:23.98		
11	Ky Robinson	Australia	13:26.70		
12	Alex Yee	Great Britain	13:27.79		SB
—	Thierry Ndikumwenayo	Spain	DNF		
—	Saymon Amanuel	Eritrea	DNF		PM
—	Arthur Gervais	France	DNF		PM

3000 Metres steeplechase
Place	Athlete	Nation	Time	Points	Notes
1st place, gold medalist(s)	Simon Koech	Kenya	8:03.35	8	
2nd place, silver medalist(s)	Ryuji Miura	Japan	8:10.30	7	SB
3rd place, bronze medalist(s)	Edmund Serem	Kenya	8:11.15	6	
4	Matthew Wilkinson	United States	8:11.76	5	
5	Leonard Bett	Kenya	8:13.37	4	SB
6	Ruben Querinjean	Luxembourg	8:14.22	3	SB
7	Carson Williams	United States	8:17.36	2	
8	Geordie Beamish	New Zealand	8:19.36	1	
9	Djilali Bedrani	France	8:19.45		
10	Amos Serem	Kenya	8:21.30		SB
11	Niklas Buchholz	Germany	8:21.46		
12	Dinka Fikadu	Ethiopia	8:29.28		
13	Alejandro Quijada	Spain	8:30.84		
14	Nicolas-Marie Daru	France	8:33.15		
15	Ayoub el Amani	France	8:35.16		
—	Abraham Kibiwot	Kenya	DNF		
—	Wilberforce Chemiat Kones	Kenya	DNF		PM
—	Cornelius Kipkosgei Konor	Kenya	DNF		PM

High jump
Place	Athlete	Nation	Height	Points	Notes
1st place, gold medalist(s)	Oleh Doroshchuk	Ukraine	2.32 m	8	
2nd place, silver medalist(s)	Kimani Jack	Great Britain	2.30 m	7	
3rd place, bronze medalist(s)	Sarvesh Kushare	India	2.26 m	6	
4	Romaine Beckford	Jamaica	2.23 m	5	
4	JuVaughn Harrison	United States	2.23 m	5	SB
6	Matteo Sioli	Italy	2.23 m	3	
6	Gianmarco Tamberi	Italy	2.23 m	3	SB
8	Mutaz Barsham	Qatar	2.20 m	1	
8	Erick Portillo	Mexico	2.20 m	1	
8	Jan Štefela	Czech Republic	2.20 m	1	
11	Tobias Potye	Germany	2.16 m		

=== Women's ===
Pole vault
Place	Athlete	Nation	Height	Points	Notes
1st place, gold medalist(s)	Nina Kennedy	Australia	4.95 m	8	AR, WL
2nd place, silver medalist(s)	Amanda Moll	United States	4.72 m	7	
3rd place, bronze medalist(s)	Emily Grove	United States	4.62 m	6	
4	Angelica Moser	Switzerland	4.62 m	5	
5	Katie Moon	United States	4.62 m	4	
6	Tina Šutej	Slovenia	4.62 m	3	
7	Hana Moll	United States	4.52 m	2	
8	Imogen Ayris	New Zealand	4.37 m	1	
9	Marie-Julie Bonnin	France	4.37 m		
—	Moana Peyrard	France	NM		

Triple jump
Place	Athlete	Nation	Distance	Points	Notes
1st place, gold medalist(s)	Leyanis Pérez	Cuba	15.06 m	8	PB
2nd place, silver medalist(s)	Saly Sarr	Senegal	14.99 m	7	PB
3rd place, bronze medalist(s)	Thea LaFond	Dominica	14.79 m	6	
4	Davisleydi Velazco	Cuba	14.66 m	5	
5	Liadagmis Povea	Cuba	14.43 m	4	
6	Dariya Derkach	Italy	14.33 m	3	
7	Neja Filipič	Slovenia	14.07 m	2	
8	Ackelia Smith	Jamaica	14.02 m	1	

Javelin throw
Place	Athlete	Nation	Distance	Points	Notes
1st place, gold medalist(s)	Yan Ziyi	China	68.75 m	8	
2nd place, silver medalist(s)	Adriana Vilagoš	Serbia	63.18 m	7	
3rd place, bronze medalist(s)	Elina Tzengko	Greece	58.20 m	6	
4	Anete Sietiņa	Latvia	57.67 m	5	
5	Mackenzie Little	Australia	57.62 m	4	
6	Alizée Minard	France	57.06 m	3	
7	Jo-Ané du Plessis	South Africa	56.64 m	2	
8	Sigrid Borge	Norway	56.57 m	1	
9	Haruka Kitaguchi	Japan	56.24 m		
—	Flor Ruiz	Colombia	NM		

== Promotional events results ==
=== Men's ===
Pole vault
Place	Athlete	Nation	Height	Notes
1st place, gold medalist(s)	Armand Duplantis	Sweden	6.07 m	
2nd place, silver medalist(s)	Baptiste Thiery	France	5.85 m	
3rd place, bronze medalist(s)	Kurtis Marschall	Australia	5.85 m	
4	Thibaut Collet	France	5.70 m	
4	Renaud Lavillenie	France	5.70 m	
6	Ben Broeders	Belgium	5.50 m	

== National events results ==
=== Men's ===
1000 Metres
Place	Athlete	Nation	Time	Notes
1st place, gold medalist(s)	Youssef Benzamia	France	2:20.32	SB
2nd place, silver medalist(s)	Soma Nagahara	Japan	2:21.47	SB
3rd place, bronze medalist(s)	Francois Ducourant	France	2:24.20	PB
4	Mathis Avrillon	France	2:24.56	SB
5	Robin Parola	France	2:24.61	SB
6	Gabriele Ferrara	Italy	2:25.01	PB
7	Yuki Murao	Japan	2:25.49	SB
8	Jean-baptiste Aubanton	France	2:26.34	SB
9	Max Russell	Australia	2:26.35	SB
10	David Proctor	Great Britain	2:26.76	SB
11	Romain Toth	France	2:27.38	PB
12	Glenn le Gouil	France	2:27.46	PB
13	Gabriele Giannini	Italy	2:28.58	PB
14	Emilien Gaillard	France	2:28.83	PB
15	Chakib Djadoun	France	2:28.99	SB
16	Natan Girardin	Monaco	2:29.81	SB
17	Fabrizi Wogene	Italy	2:30.68	SB
18	Samir Benaddi	Italy	2:30.79	
19	Ithocor Meloni	Italy	2:30.94	SB
20	Raphael Lough	Great Britain	2:33.79	SB

=== Women's ===
1000 Metres
Place	Athlete	Nation	Time	Notes
1st place, gold medalist(s)	Elly Fleming	Australia	2:53.23	SB
2nd place, silver medalist(s)	Chiara Pizzolato	Italy	2:53.90	PB
3rd place, bronze medalist(s)	Tetiana Savluk-Lagoutte	France	2:54.12	PB
4	Irene Sinesi	Italy	2:57.59	PB
5	Dana Dordevič	Croatia	2:58.07	SB
6	Gaia Lucente	Italy	2:58.09	PB
7	Alison Teyssiere	France	3:01.46	SB
8	Ilaria Arini	Switzerland	3:01.89	SB
9	Jerusha Olive Jason	Malaysia	3:01.92	SB
10	Lucinda Alder	Australia	3:02.42	SB
11	Nezha Azeroual	Morocco	3:02.64	SB
12	Asia Ridolfi	Italy	3:02.80	PB
13	Federica Pagliassotto	Italy	3:03.18	SB
14	Marta Diez	Spain	3:03.84	SB
15	Melissa Madoun	France	3:04.08	PB
16	Astrid Moreau	France	3:04.17	PB
17	Priscilla Ravera	Italy	3:04.30	SB
18	Diana Straistaru	Italy	3:04.57	
19	Chloe Gauthier	France	3:06.99	SB
20	Justine Brazy-lechien	France	3:08.85	
21	Sofia Sbernini	Italy	3:16.29	SB

== See also ==
- 2026 Diamond League
