= Saida Tsehaye =

Ethiopian runner (born 2008)

Personal information
- Born: 7 July 2008 (age 18)

Sport
- Sport: Athletics
- Event: Middle-distance

Saida Tsehaye (born 7 July 2008) is an Ethiopian middle-distance runner. In 2026, she set a new Ethiopian under-20 record for the 800 metres.

== Biography ==
On her debut in the 2026 Diamond League on 19 June 2026, she had a twelfth place finish in 2:04.22 for the 800 metres at the 2026 Doha Diamond League. On 1 August 2026, she set a new Ethiopian under-20 record for the 800 metres with a time of 1:57.96 in Oordegem, Belgium. The under-20 world leader ahead of the 2026 World U20 Championships, she was unable to compete as she could not acquire the necessary visa to travel to compete in the United States. She set a new 800 m personal best again in the Diamond League at the 2026 Athletissima in Lausanne, Switzerland on 21 August 2026, placing third behind Audrey Werro and Femke Broeders-Bol. Having ran an opening lap of 55.7 seconds, she finished with a time of 1:56:92 having briefly overtaken Broeders-Bol on the on the last lap before the Dutchwoman set a new national record herself. At the 2026 Diamond League Final in Brussels on 5 September, she placed third behind Werro and Broeders-Bol again, running 1:57.57 but was later disqualified for a lane infringement.
