= 2026 Bislett Games =

Athletics meeting in Oslo, Norway

- Dates: 10 June 2026
- Host city: Oslo, Norway
- Venue: Bislett Stadium
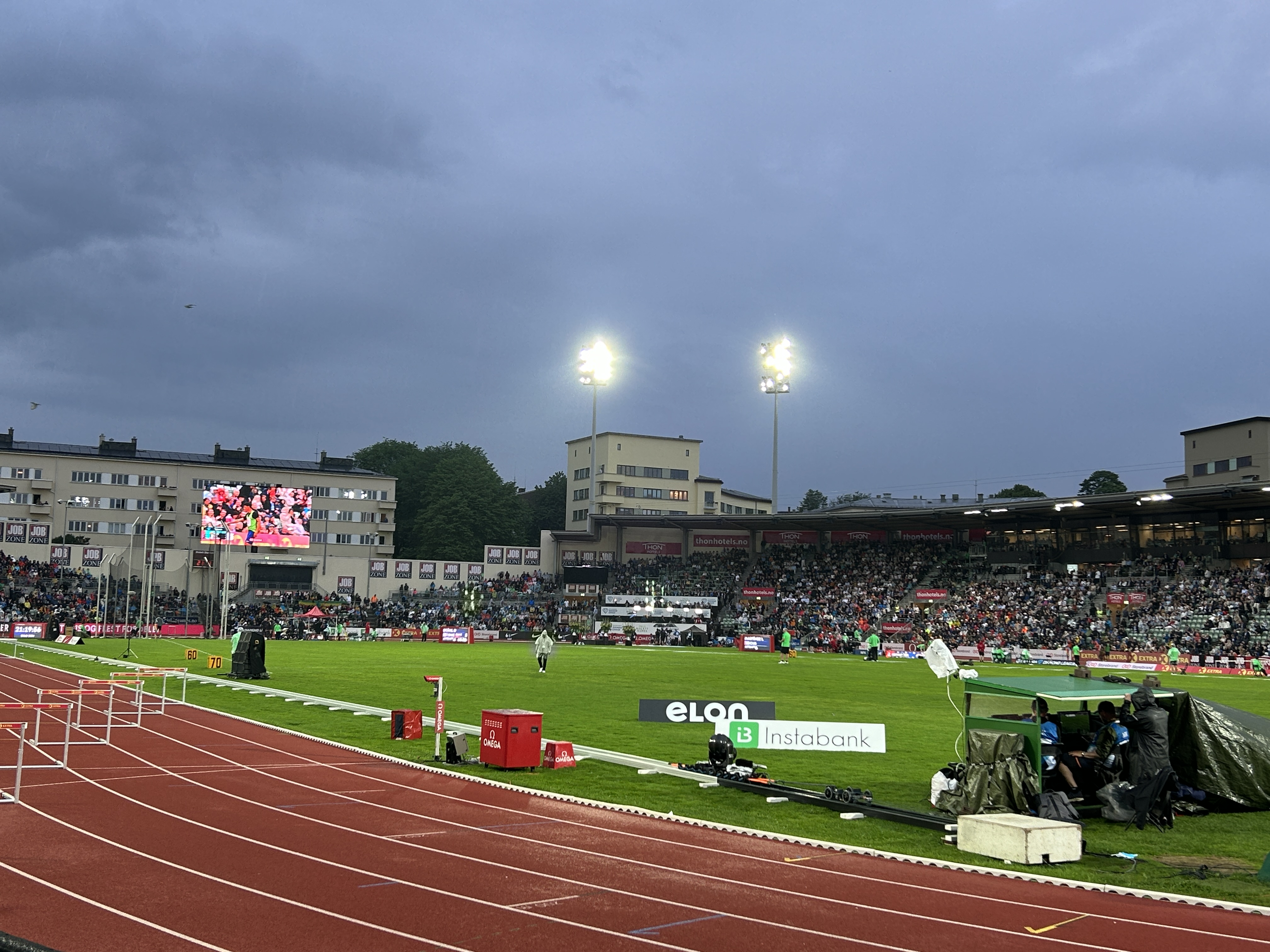
- Level: 2026 Diamond League

The 2026 Bislett Games was the 61st edition of the annual outdoor track and field meeting in Oslo, Norway. Held on 10 June at Bislett Stadium, it was the sixth leg of the 2026 Diamond League – the highest level international track and field circuit.

== Diamond+ events results ==
=== Men's ===
200 Metres
Place	Athlete	Nation	Time	Points	Notes
1st place, gold medalist(s)	Letsile Tebogo	Botswana	19.84	8	SB
2nd place, silver medalist(s)	Sinesipho Dambile	South Africa	20.12	7	
3rd place, bronze medalist(s)	Jereem Richards	Trinidad and Tobago	20.50	6	
4	Reynier Mena	Cuba	20.53	5	
5	Timothé Mumenthaler	Switzerland	20.58	4	SB
6	Gout Gout	Australia	20.60	3	
7	Andreas Ofstad Kulseng	Norway	20.71	2	
8	Xavi Mo-Ajok	Netherlands	20.89	1	SB
			Wind: (+0.2 m/s)		

5000 Metres
Place	Athlete	Nation	Time	Points	Notes
1st place, gold medalist(s)	Addisu Yihune	Ethiopia	12:47.62	8	WL, PB
2nd place, silver medalist(s)	Birhanu Balew	Bahrain	12:47.73	7	AR
3rd place, bronze medalist(s)	Andreas Almgren	Sweden	12:48.61	6	SB
4	Parker Wolfe	United States	12:49.45	5	PB
5	Grant Fisher	United States	12:49.61	4	SB
6	Graham Blanks	United States	12:49.99	3	SB
7	Mezgebu Sime	Ethiopia	12:50.17	2	SB
8	Ky Robinson	Australia	12:50.82	1	AR
9	Biniam Mehary	Ethiopia	12:54.35		SB
10	Cornelius Kemboi	Kenya	12:56.02		PB
11	Ishmael Kipkurui	Kenya	12:56.96		PB
12	Jacob Krop	Kenya	13:01.51		SB
13	Dominic Lokinyomo Lobalu	Switzerland	13:08.78		SB
14	Isaac Kimeli	Belgium	13:13.17		SB
15	Tim Verbaandert	Netherlands	13:13.34		SB
16	Tshepo Tshite	South Africa	13:20.92		PB
—	Sam Gilman	United States	DNF		
—	Maximilian Thorwirth	Germany	DNF		

400 Metres hurdles
Place	Athlete	Nation	Time	Points	Notes
1st place, gold medalist(s)	Alison dos Santos	Brazil	46.89	8	
2nd place, silver medalist(s)	Karsten Warholm	Norway	47.40	7	
3rd place, bronze medalist(s)	Caleb Dean	United States	48.22	6	
4	Matheus Lima	Brazil	48.37	5	
5	Emil Agyekum	Germany	48.40	4	
6	Abderrahman Samba	Qatar	48.60	3	
7	Matic Ian Guček	Slovenia	49.31	2	
8	Carl Bengtström	Sweden	49.36	1	

Pole vault
Place	Athlete	Nation	Height	Points	Notes
1st place, gold medalist(s)	Kurtis Marschall	Australia	5.82 m	8	
2nd place, silver medalist(s)	Sondre Guttormsen	Norway	5.72 m	7	
3rd place, bronze medalist(s)	Sam Kendricks	United States	5.72 m	6	
4	Zach Bradford	United States	5.72 m	6	
5	Baptiste Thiery	France	5.72 m	5	
6	Emmanouil Karalis	Greece	5.62 m	4	
7	Thibaut Collet	France	5.62 m	3	
8	Menno Vloon	Netherlands	5.42 m	2	
9	Renaud Lavillenie	France	5.42 m	1	
—	Simen Guttormsen	Norway	NM		

=== Women's ===
100 Metres
Place	Athlete	Nation	Time	Points	Notes
1st place, gold medalist(s)	Julien Alfred	Saint Lucia	10.76	8	
2nd place, silver medalist(s)	Amy Hunt	Great Britain	10.99	7	
3rd place, bronze medalist(s)	Zoe Hobbs	New Zealand	11.03	6	
4	Minke Bisschops	Netherlands	11.06	5	
5	Boglárka Takács	Hungary	11.08	4	
6	Patrizia Van der Weken	Luxembourg	11.10	3	
7	Julia Henriksson	Sweden	11.41	2	
8	Helene Rønningen	Norway	11.46	1	
			Wind: (+3.2 m/s)		

400 Metres
Place	Athlete	Nation	Time	Points	Notes
1st place, gold medalist(s)	Henriette Jæger	Norway	49.52	8	SB
2nd place, silver medalist(s)	Lurdes Gloria Manuel	Czech Republic	50.13	7	
3rd place, bronze medalist(s)	Natalia Bukowiecka	Poland	50.34	6	
4	Amber Anning	Great Britain	50.35	5	
5	Nickisha Pryce	Jamaica	50.39	4	
6	Lieke Klaver	Netherlands	50.64	3	
7	Josefine Tomine Eriksen	Norway	52.10	2	
8	Lakeri Ertzgaard	Norway	52.99	1	

3000 Metres
Place	Athlete	Nation	Time	Points	Notes
1st place, gold medalist(s)	Freweyni Hailu	Ethiopia	8:24.22	8	WL
2nd place, silver medalist(s)	Likina Amebaw	Ethiopia	8:25.15	7	SB
3rd place, bronze medalist(s)	Senayet Getachew	Ethiopia	8:25.85	6	PB
4	Hawi Abera	Ethiopia	8:27.18	5	PB
5	Maureen Koster	Netherlands	8:27.67	4	SB
6	Linden Hall	Australia	8:28.06	3	
7	Megan Keith	Great Britain	8:28.35	2	PB
8	Rose Davies	Australia	8:29.63	1	PB
9	Innes FitzGerald	Great Britain	8:33.37		SB
10	Lauren Ryan	Australia	8:33.66		PB
11	Yenenesh Shimeket	Ethiopia	8:34.48		SB
12	Hannah Nuttall	Great Britain	8:35.20		
13	Hirut Meshesha	Ethiopia	8:36.32		
14	Charity Cherop	Uganda	8:39.22		PB
15	Salomé Afonso	Portugal	8:39.85		SB
16	Georgia Griffith	Australia	8:40.75		
17	Amalie Sæten	Norway	9:02.31		
—	Margot Appleton	United States	DNF		PM
—	Aleksandra Bereśniewicz	Poland	DNF		PM

Javelin throw
Place	Athlete	Nation	Distance	Points	Notes
1st place, gold medalist(s)	Yan Ziyi	China	67.11 m	8	
2nd place, silver medalist(s)	Sigrid Borge	Norway	61.92 m	7	
3rd place, bronze medalist(s)	Adriana Vilagoš	Serbia	61.33 m	6	
4	Flor Ruiz	Colombia	61.11 m	5	
5	Anete Sietiņa	Latvia	59.72 m	4	SB
6	Juleisy Angulo	Ecuador	57.58 m	3	SB
7	Marie-Therese Obst	Norway	56.37 m	2	SB
8	Nikola Ogrodníková	Czech Republic	55.94 m	1	
9	Elina Tzengko	Greece	53.75 m		

== Diamond events results ==
=== Men's ===
800 Metres
Place	Athlete	Nation	Time	Points	Notes
1st place, gold medalist(s)	Cooper Lutkenhaus	United States	1:42.08	8	WL, AJR
2nd place, silver medalist(s)	Emmanuel Wanyonyi	Kenya	1:42.09	7	SB
3rd place, bronze medalist(s)	Marco Arop	Canada	1:43.33	6	
4	Tobias Grønstad	Norway	1:43.61	5	PB
5	Peter Bol	Australia	1:43.64	4	SB
6	Eliott Crestan	Belgium	1:43.85	3	
7	Gabriel Tual	France	1:44.79	2	
8	Mohamed Attaoui	Spain	1:45.66	1	
—	Mark English	Ireland	DNF		
—	Patryk Sieradzki	Poland	DNF		PM

Dream mile
Place	Athlete	Nation	Time	Points	Notes
1st place, gold medalist(s)	Timothy Cheruiyot	Kenya	3:48.21 [.202]	8	SB
2nd place, silver medalist(s)	Yared Nuguse	United States	3:48.21 [.207]	7	SB
3rd place, bronze medalist(s)	Cameron Myers	Australia	3:48.35	6	
4	Hobbs Kessler	United States	3:49.13	5	
5	Jake Wightman	Great Britain	3:49.36	4	SB
6	Festus Lagat	Kenya	3:49.46	3	SB
7	Azeddine Habz	France	3:49.63	2	SB
8	Andrew Coscoran	Ireland	3:49.68	1	
9	Reynold Cheruiyot	Kenya	3:49.72		SB
10	Robert Farken	Germany	3:49.74		SB
11	Samuel Pihlström	Sweden	3:50.27		SB
12	Isaac Nader	Portugal	3:50.71		SB
13	Narve Gilje Nordås	Norway	3:53.87		SB
—	Michał Rozmys	Poland	DNF		PM
—	Žan Rudolf	Slovenia	DNF		PM

Triple jump
Place	Athlete	Nation	Distance	Points	Notes
1st place, gold medalist(s)	Jordan Scott	Jamaica	17.66 m (+2.6 m/s)	8	
2nd place, silver medalist(s)	Andy Díaz	Italy	17.59 m (±0.0 m/s)	7	=SB
3rd place, bronze medalist(s)	Yasser Triki	Algeria	17.43 m (+2.4 m/s)	6	
4	Lázaro Martínez	Cuba	17.33 m (+0.5 m/s)	5	SB
5	Jaydon Hibbert	Jamaica	17.17 m (+0.8 m/s)	4	SB
6	Melvin Raffin	France	16.37 m (−0.8 m/s)	3	
7	Almir dos Santos	Brazil	15.85 m (+2.2 m/s)	2	

=== Women's ===
400 Metres hurdles
Place	Athlete	Nation	Time	Points	Notes
1st place, gold medalist(s)	Emma Zapletalová	Slovakia	53.13	8	
2nd place, silver medalist(s)	Rushell Clayton	Jamaica	53.50	7	
3rd place, bronze medalist(s)	Jasmine Jones	United States	54.09	6	
4	Gianna Woodruff	Panama	54.68	5	
5	Amalie Iuel	Norway	54.79	4	
6	Fatoumata Binta Diallo	Portugal	55.13	3	
7	Elisabeth Slettum	Norway	56.86	2	
8	Andrea Rooth	Norway	57.41	1	

Triple jump
Place	Athlete	Nation	Distance	Points	Notes
1st place, gold medalist(s)	Davisleydi Velazco	Cuba	14.85 m (+2.3 m/s)	8	
2nd place, silver medalist(s)	Saly Sarr	Senegal	14.75 m (+0.9 m/s)	7	PB
3rd place, bronze medalist(s)	Leyanis Pérez	Cuba	14.60 m (+2.2 m/s)	6	
4	Ackelia Smith	Jamaica	14.50 m (+1.3 m/s)	5	SB
5	Thea LaFond	Dominica	14.49 m (+1.6 m/s)	4	
6	Liadagmis Povea	Cuba	14.21 m (+1.9 m/s)	3	
7	Maja Åskag	Sweden	13.90 m (+2.6 m/s)	2	

Shot put
Place	Athlete	Nation	Distance	Points	Notes
1st place, gold medalist(s)	Chase Jackson	United States	20.74 m	8	MR, SB
2nd place, silver medalist(s)	Jessica Schilder	Netherlands	20.11 m	7	
3rd place, bronze medalist(s)	Sarah Mitton	Canada	19.89 m	6	
4	Yemisi Mabry	Germany	19.19 m	5	
5	Jaida Ross	United States	19.08 m	4	SB
6	Danniel Thomas-Dodd	Jamaica	18.83 m	3	
7	Fanny Roos	Sweden	18.63 m	2	
8	Maggie Ewen	United States	17.56 m	1	

== See also ==
- 2026 Diamond League
