= Cornelius Kemboi =

Kenyan athlete (born 2000)

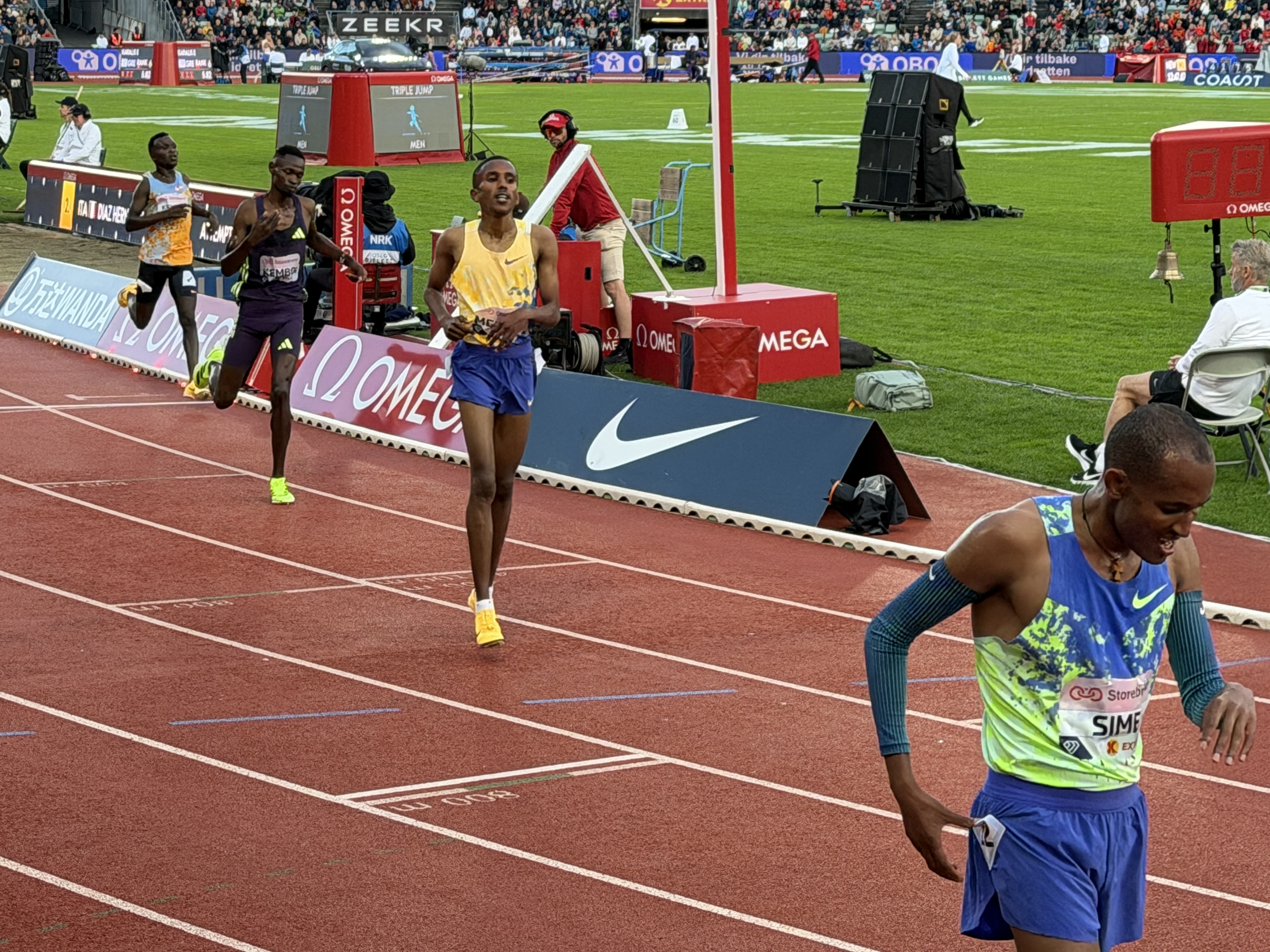
- Kemboi at the 2026 Bislett Games

Personal information
- Full name: Cornelius Kibet Kemboi
- Nationality: Kenyan
- Born: 29 February 2000 (age 26)

Sport
- Sport: Athletics
- Event: 1500 metres – 5000 metres

Achievements and titles
- Personal bests: 1500m: 3:41.3 (Nairobi, 2021); 3000m: 7:27.46 (Shanghai, 2026); 5000m: 12:47.79 (Brussels, 2026)
Medal record
Men's athletics
Representing Kenya
Diamond League
Third place	2026	5000 m
African Games
Bronze medal – third place	2023 Accra	5000 m

Cornelius Kibet Kemboi (born 29 February 2000) is a Kenyan long-distance runner.

== Early and personal life ==
Kemboi attended St Patrick's High School in Iten, in the west of Kenya, 350 kilometres north-west of Nairobi. His idol growing up was David Rudisha. He has two older brothers who both received athletics scholarships in the United States.

== Career ==
Competing at the 2022 Commonwealth Games, in Birmingham, Kemboi finished eleventh in the final of the 5000m.

Kemboi ran a new personal best 5000m time of 13:00.68 at the Night of Athletics meeting in Heusden, Belgium in July 2023. He finished third in the 5000m at the Kenyan World Championship trials for the, held in Nairobi. He competed at the 2023 World Athletics Championships in Budapest but did not qualify for the 5000m final.

He was selected for the 2023 World Athletics Road Running Championships in Riga, and finished fifth in the men's 5 km race on 1 October 2023.

In January 2024, he won the Discovery Cross Country race in Eldoret in a time of 29:42. He won a bronze medal in the 5000m race at the 2023 African Games in Accra in March 2024.

He was selected for the 2025 World Athletics Indoor Championships in Nanjing in March 2025, where he finished in eighth place. He finished eighth in the 5000 metres at the 2025 Shanghai Diamond League event in China on 3 May 2025. He finished sixth over 5000 metres on 16 May at the 2025 Doha Diamond League.

He won the 5000 metres race at the Kenyan World Championships Trials in July 2025 ahead of Mathew Kipsang. In September 2025, he competed over 5000 metres at the 2025 World Championships in Tokyo, Japan, without advancing to the final. Kemboi placed third at the tRUNsylvania 10K – a World Athletics Elite Label road race in Brasov, Romania in October 2025.

In April 2026, Kemboi won the 5000m in 13:09.31 ahead of compatriot Frankline Kibet at the Kip Keino Classic in Nairobi. In May, he placed fifth over 3000 m in a personal best 7:27.46 at the 2026 Shanghai Diamond League and also placed eighth in the 5000 metres at the 2026 Xiamen Diamond League. In June, he ran a personal best 12:56.02 for the 5000 metres at the 2026 Bislett Games and placed fifth in the Diamond League at that distance at the 2026 Herculis event in Monaco. He placed fourth competing in the 5000 metres at the 2026 Commonwealth Games in Glasgow, Scotland. Competing in the Diamond League at the 2026 Athletissima in Lausanne, Switzerland on 21 August 2026, he placed fifth over 5000 metres. At the 2026 Diamond League Final in Brussels on 5 September, he placed third in 12:47.29 over 5000 metres.
