= 2026 African Championships in Athletics – Women's triple jump =

Women's triple jump at the 2026 African Championships in Athletics
- Venue: Legon Sports Stadium
- Location: Accra, Ghana
- Dates: 17 May
- Competitors: 8 from 7 nations
- Winning time: 14.79w

Medalists
gold medal	Saly Sarr	Senegal
silver medal	Liliane Potiron	Mauritius
bronze medal	Zinzi Xulu	South Africa

The women's triple jump event at the 2026 African Championships in Athletics was held on 17 May in Accra, Ghana.

== Results ==
Rank	Athlete	Nationality	#1	#2	#3	#4	#5	#6	Result	Notes
1st place, gold medalist(s)	Saly Sarr	Senegal							14.79w	
2nd place, silver medalist(s)	Liliane Potiron	Mauritius							13.94	
3rd place, bronze medalist(s)	Zinzi Xulu	South Africa							13.43w	
4	Véronique Kossenda Rey	Cameroon							13.12	
4	Zalissa Zongo	Burkina Faso							13.12	
6	Martha Monyenche Nyabuto	Kenya							12.39w	
7	Faith Jepkemboi Kipsang	Kenya							12.03w	
8	Frieda Iithete	Namibia							12.00w	
	Richalda Mohamed	Comoros							DNS	
	Anne-Suzanna Fosther-Katta	Cameroon							DNS	
