= Davisleydi Velazco =

Cuban athlete

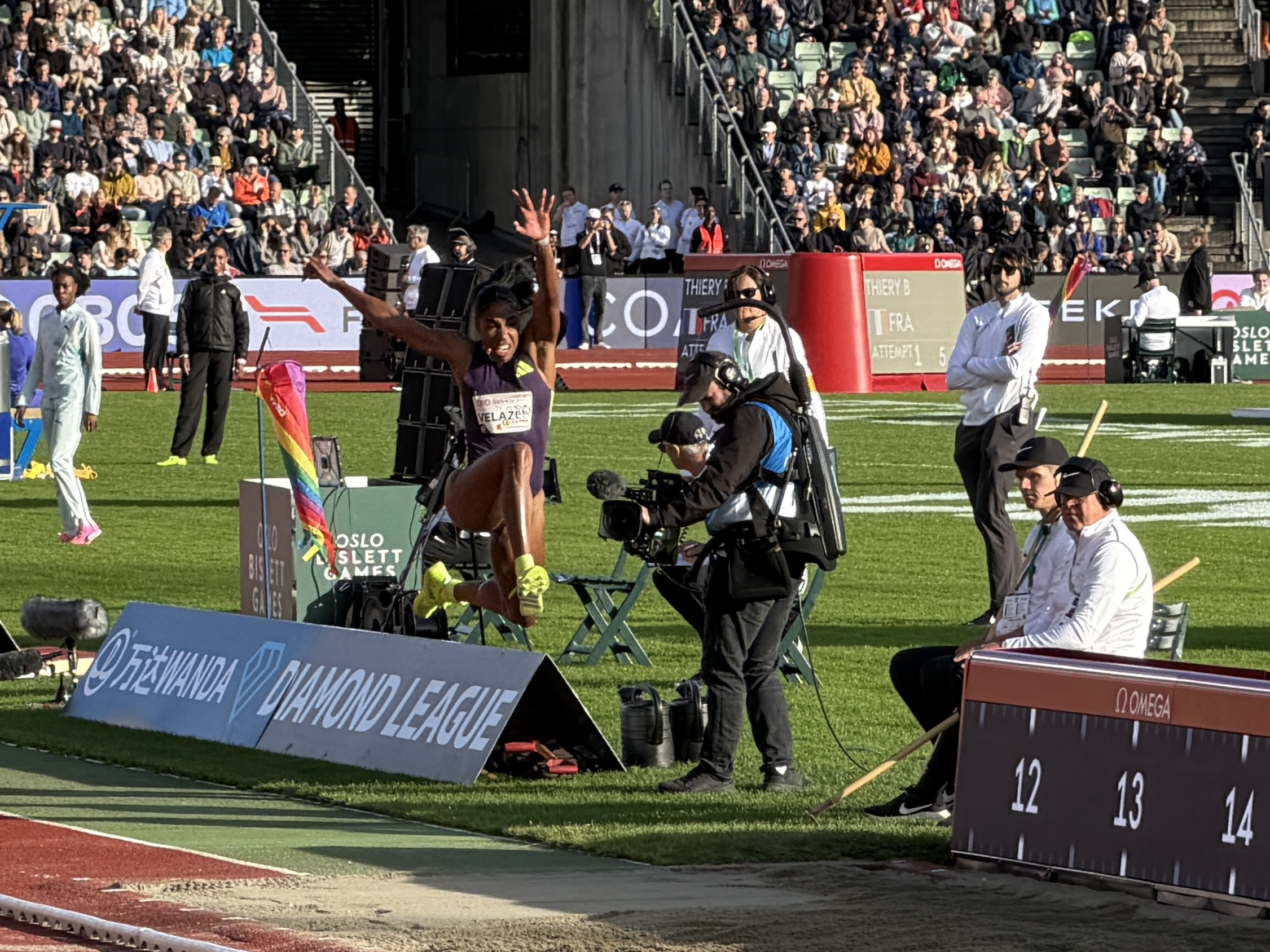
- Velazco at the 2026 Bislett Games

Personal information
- Nationality: Cuban
- Born: Davisleydi Velazco; 4 September 1999 (age 27)

Sport
- Sport: Athletics
- Event: Triple jump

Achievements and titles
- Personal bests: Triple jump: 15.13m (Doha, 2026)
Medal record
Women's athletics
Representing Cuba
World Ultimate Championship
Second place	2026 Budapest	Triple jump
Diamond League
Third place	2026	Triple jump
NACAC Championships
Bronze medal – third place	2022 Freeport	Triple jump
IAAF World U20 Championships
Bronze medal – third place	2018 Tampere	Triple jump

Davisleydi Velazco (born 4 September 1999) is a Cuban athlete who competes in the triple jump. She won bronze at the 2018 IAAF World U20 Championships and went on to represent Cuba at the World Athletics Championships and Olympic Games.

== Biography ==
Her jump of 14.34m on 21 March 2020 was the sixth longest jump in the world that year. At the 2020 Summer Games Velazco finished eighth in her heat with a jump of 14.14 metres. She also finished 8th in her qualifying round at the 2022 World Athletics Championships in Eugene, Oregon, jumping 13.94m.

She finished as runner-up to compatriot Leyanis Perez in the triple jump at the 2025 Memorial Van Damme in the 2025 Diamond League, in Brussels, Belgium in August 2025, with a best jump of 14.72 metres. She finished third with 14.65 metres at the Diamond League Final in Zurich on 28 August.

On 10 June 2026, Velazco won her first Diamond League event, with victory at the 2026 Bislett Games in Oslo, winning ahead of Saly Sarr and her compatriot Leyanis Perez. On 19 June, she won her second at the 2026 Doha Diamond League, setting a new personal best of 15.13 metres (+1.3) with Perez and Sarr again second and third. Competing at the 2026 Diamond League Final in Brussels on 4 September, she finished third behind Sarr and Perez. On 13 September, she placed second behind Sarr and ahead of Perez at the inaugural World Ultimate Championship in Budapest with a jump of 15.04 metres.
