= Saly Sarr =

Senegalese athlete (born 2002)

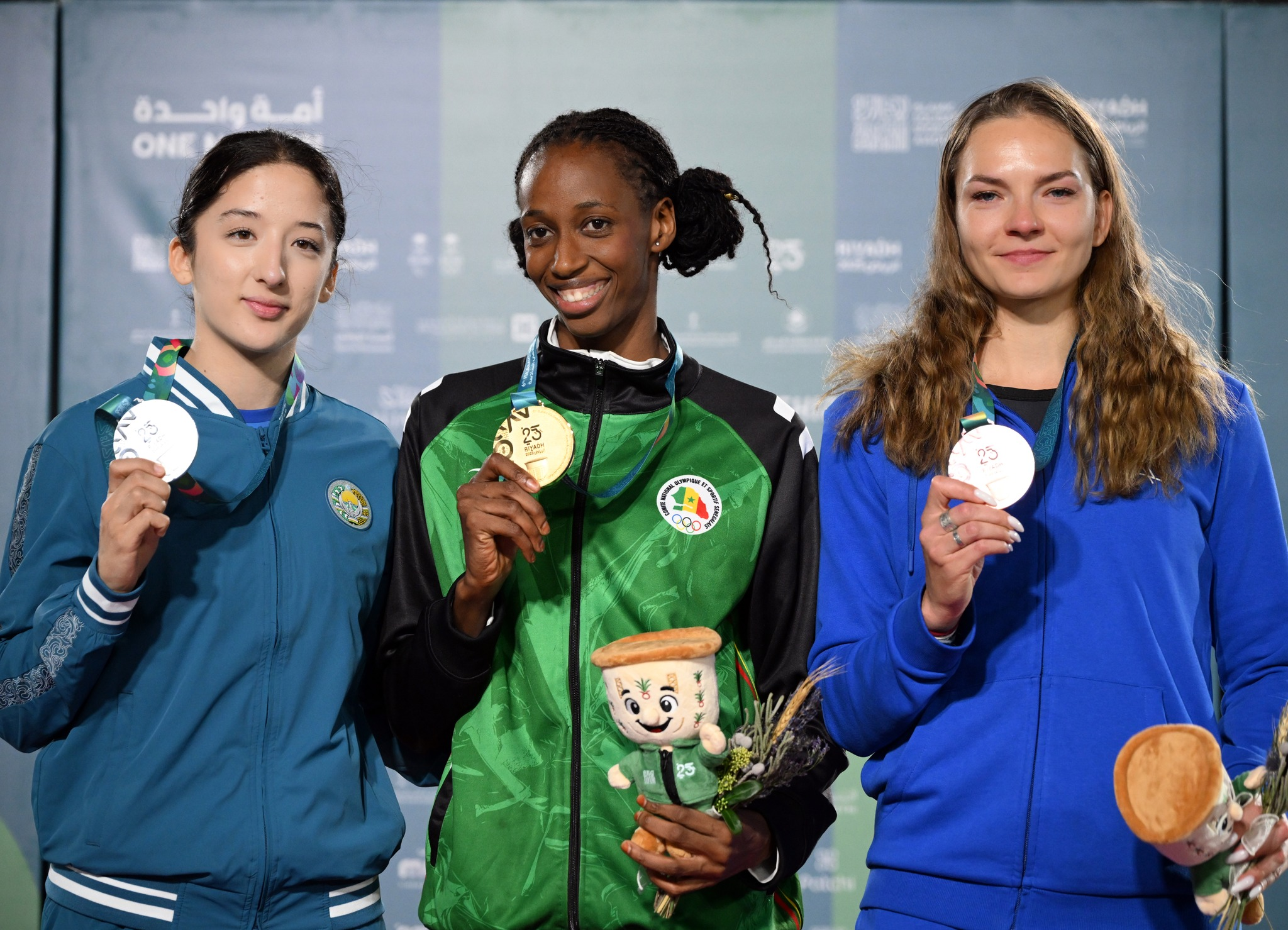
- Sarr in 2025

Personal information
- Nationality: Senegalese
- Born: 14 October 2002 (age 24) Dakar, Senegal
- Height: 1.83 m (6 ft 0 in)

Sport
- Sport: Athletics
- Event: Triple jump

Achievements and titles
- Personal bests: Triple jump: 15.08 (Silesia, 2026) NR
Medal record
Women's Athletics
Representing Senegal
World Ultimate Championship
First place	2026 Budapest	Triple jump
World Indoor Championships
Bronze medal – third place	2026 Toruń	Triple jump
Diamond League
First place	2026	Triple jump
African Championships
Gold medal – first place	2026 Accra	Triple jump
Gold medal – first place	2024 Douala	Triple jump
Silver medal – second place	2022 Saint Pierre	Triple jump
African Games
Bronze medal – third place	2023 Accra	Triple jump
Jeux de la Francophonie
Gold medal – first place	2023 Kinshasa	Triple jump
Islamic Solidarity Games
Gold medal – first place	2025 Riyadh	Triple jump

Saly Sarr (born 14 October 2002) is a Senegalese triple jumper. In 2026, she won the inaugural World Ultimate Championship as well as the Diamond League final, and won the bronze medal at the 2026 World Indoor Championships. She is the Senegalese national record holder and previously won the 2024 and 2026 African Championships, as well as representing her country at the 2024 Olympic Games and 2025 World Athletics Championships, in which she placed sixth overall.

== Biography ==
She placed in eighth in the triple jump final at the 2021 World Athletics U20 Championships in Nairobi. She was an African Championships silver medallist in Mauritius in 2022. She was a 2023 Francophone Games winner in Kinshasa in 2023.

She was an All-African Games bronze medallist in Accra in March 2024. She won the triple jump at the World Continental Tour Gold event the Golden Grand Prix in Tokyo on 19 May 2024 with a jump of 14.08 metres. She competed in the triple jump at the 2024 Paris Olympics.

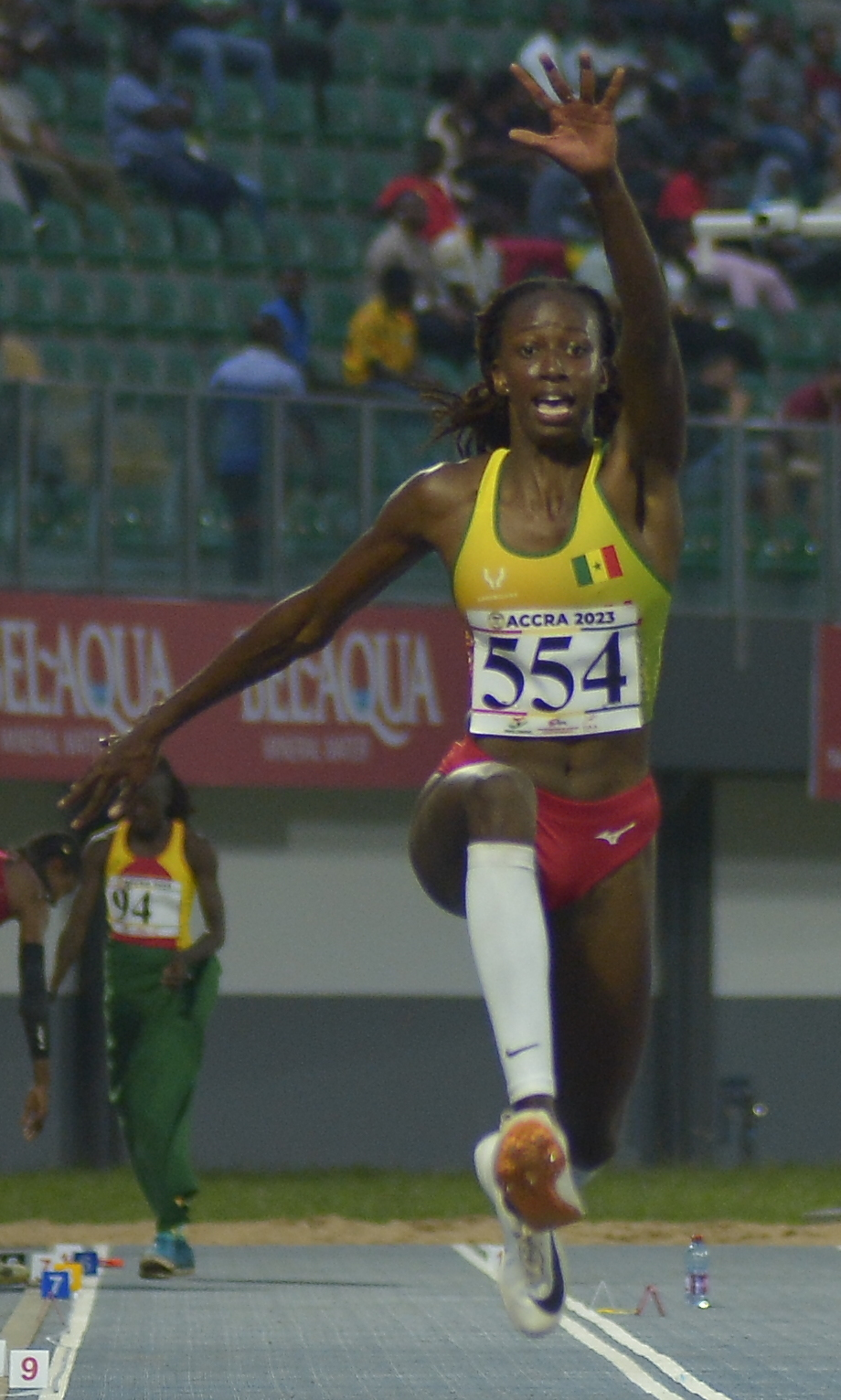
Sarr competing at the 2023 Africa Games

In September 2025, she competed at the 2025 World Championships in Tokyo, Japan, qualifying for the final and placing sixth overall with a personal best 14.55 metres.

Competing indoors for the first time in 2026, Sarr equalled her outdoor personal best of 14.55 metres and qualified for the 2026 World Athletics Indoor Championships in Poland, for only her third indoor event. On 21 March, Sarr won the bronze medal at the Championships in Toruń. Her new personal best jump of 14.70 metres was enough to secure the medal behind Yulimar Rojas and gold medalist Leyanis Pérez. In May, she retained her title at the 2026 African Championships in Athletics in Accra, Ghana. On 10 June, Sarr jumped a personal best 14.75 metres in placing second at the 2026 Bislett Games in Oslo, before improving again to 14.86 metres placing third at the 2026 Doha Diamond League. On 10 July, she placed second with a personal best 14.99m at the 2026 Herculis Diamond League event in Monaco. In August, Sarr broke the 22-year-old national record with a jump of 15.08m to jump over 15 metres for the first time to win the Diamond League event in Silesia, Poland. At the 2026 Diamond League Final in Brussels on 4 September, Sarr won the triple jump competition, her best of 14.96m beating two-time defending champion Leyanis Pérez. On 13 September, Sarr won the inaugural World Ultimate Championship in Budapest with an opening round jump of 15.06 metres.
