= 2025 World Athletics Indoor Championships – Women's triple jump =

Women's triple jump at the 2025 World Athletics Indoor Championships
- Venue: Nanjing's Cube at Nanjing Youth Olympic Sports Park
- Location: Nanjing, China
- Dates: 22 March
- Winning distance: 14.93 m

Medalists
gold medal	Leyanis Pérez	Cuba
silver medal	Liadagmis Povea	Cuba
bronze medal	Ana Peleteiro-Compaoré	Spain

The women's triple jump at the 2025 World Athletics Indoor Championships took place on the short track of the Nanjing's Cube at Nanjing Youth Olympic Sports Park in Nanjing, China, on 22 March 2025. This was the 19th time the event was contested at the World Athletics Indoor Championships. Athletes could qualify by achieving the entry standard or by their World Athletics Ranking in the event.

The final took place on 22 March during the evening session.

== Background ==
The women's triple jump was contested 18 times before 2025, at every edition of the World Athletics Indoor Championships since 1991.

Records before the 2025 World Athletics Indoor Championships
Record	Athlete (nation)	Distance (m)	Location	Date
World record	Yulimar Rojas (VEN)	15.74	Belgrade, Serbia	20 March 2022
Championship record	Yulimar Rojas (VEN)	15.74	Belgrade, Serbia	20 March 2022
World leading	Leyanis Pérez (CUB)	14.62	Liévin, France	13 February 2025

== Qualification ==
For the women's triple jump, the qualification period ran from 1 September 2024 until 9 March 2025. Athletes could qualify by achieving the entry standards of 14.60 m. Athletes could also qualify by virtue of their World Athletics Ranking for the event or by virtue of their World Athletics Indoor Tour wildcard. There was a target number of 16 athletes.

== Final ==
The final started on 23 March at 19:10 (UTC+8).

Place	Athlete	Nation	#1	#2	#3	#4	#5	#6	Result	Notes
1st place, gold medalist(s)	Leyanis Pérez	Cuba	14.93	x	–	x	–	–	14.93 m	WL
2nd place, silver medalist(s)	Liadagmis Povea	Cuba	14.56	14.57	14.22	–	11.96	13.95	14.57 m	SB
3rd place, bronze medalist(s)	Ana Peleteiro-Compaoré	Spain	14.24	14.29	14.29	14.02	14.10	x	14.29 m	
4	Thea LaFond	Dominica	13.85	11.84	x	14.01	13.79	14.18 m	14.18	SB
5	Maja Åskag	Sweden	13.80	13.83	14.01	x	13.94	x	14.01 m	
6	Neja Filipič	Slovenia	13.92	x	x	x	13.38	12.00	13.92 m	
7	Li Yi	China	13.84	x	x	x	x		13.84 m	
8	Jessie Maduka	Germany	13.82	13.40	13.60	13.20	x		13.82 m	
9	Diana Ion	Romania	13.60	13.66	13.61	13.57			13.66 m	
10	Marija Sinej	Ukraine	13.25	13.37	13.58	x			13.58 m	
11	Emilia Sjöstrand	Sweden	13.55	x	x				13.55 m	
12	Sharifa Davronova	Uzbekistan	x	13.44	13.28				13.44 m	
13	Regiclécia Cândido	Brazil	12.54	13.38	13.40				13.40 m	
