= Ryann Porter =

American athlete (born 2002)

Personal information
- Nationality: American
- Born: May 21, 2002 (age 24) Akron, Ohio, U.S.
- Education: Indiana State University ’23 BS Elementary Education; University of Oregon ’25 MS Education Policy
- Height: 1.88 m (6 ft 2 in)

Sport
- Sport: Athletics
- Events: Triple jump, Long jump
- Turned pro: 2025

Achievements and titles
- Personal best: 13.94 m (45 ft 9 in)
Medal record
Women's athletics
Representing the United States
World Indoor Championships
2026 Poland	triple jump

Ryann Porter (born May 21, 2002) is an American athlete. She qualified to represent America at World Indoor Championships in the triple jump, having earned bronze medal at the 2026 USA Indoor Championships. Porter’s best jump was 13.94 m (45 ft 9 in) at Randal Tyson Track Center in January 2026.

== Prep career ==
Porter was a high point scorer for George S. Parker High School at the 2019 Wisconsin Interscholastic Athletic Association Division I State Track and Field Championship meet:

- second (triple jump)
- seventh (long jump)
- ninth (100m hurdles)
- eleventh (4X200m relay)

Porter competed at the 2018 Wisconsin Interscholastic Athletic Association Division I State Track and Field Championship meet:

- fifth (100m hurdles)
- eighth (triple jump)

== College Competition ==
Year	Big Ten Conference indoor Track and Field Championships	NCAA indoor Track and Field Championships	Big Ten Conference Outdoor Track and Field Championships	NCAA Outdoor Track and Field Championships
Representing the Oregon Ducks
2025	13.37 m (43 ft 10 in) 2nd Triple Jump	13.00 m (42 ft 8 in); 12th Triple Jump	13.55 m (44 ft 5 in) 1st Triple Jump	13.22 m (43 ft 4 in) 8th Triple Jump
Representing the Indiana State Sycamores
Year	Missouri Valley Conference indoor Track and Field Championships	NCAA indoor Track and Field Championships	Missouri Valley Conference Outdoor Track and Field Championships	NCAA Outdoor Track and Field Championships
2023	12.59 m (41 ft 4 in) 1st Triple Jump	DNQ	12.85 m (42 ft 2 in) 1st Triple Jump	13.03 m (42 ft 9 in) 19th Triple Jump
2023	8.52 seconds 2nd 60 m hurdles	DNQ	13.97 seconds 2nd 100 m hurdles	13.03 m (42 ft 9 in) 19th Triple Jump
2023	5.58 m (18 ft 4 in) 8th Long Jump	DNQ	5.77 m (18 ft 11 in) 4th Long Jump	13.03 m (42 ft 9 in) 19th Triple Jump
2022	12.58 m (41 ft 3 in) 1st Triple Jump	DNQ	12.67 m (41 ft 7 in) 1st Triple Jump	12.76 m (41 ft 10 in) 19th Triple Jump
2022	8.62 seconds 2nd 60 m hurdles	DNQ	14.15 seconds 4th 100 m hurdles	12.76 m (41 ft 10 in) 19th Triple Jump
2022	5.70 m (18 ft 8 in) 1st Long Jump	DNQ	5.50 m (18 ft 1 in) 9th Long Jump	12.76 m (41 ft 10 in) 19th Triple Jump
2021	11.68 m (38 ft 4 in) 5th Triple Jump	DNQ	12.91 m (42 ft 4 in) 1st Triple Jump	12.62 m (41 ft 5 in) 24th Triple Jump
2021	8.81 seconds 3rd 60 m hurdles	DNQ	14.40 seconds 8th 100 m hurdles	12.62 m (41 ft 5 in) 24th Triple Jump
2021	5.37 m (17 ft 7 in) 11th Long Jump	DNQ	5.56 m (18 ft 3 in) 6th Long Jump	12.62 m (41 ft 5 in) 24th Triple Jump

== Professional Competitions ==
Year	Competition	Venue	Position	Event	Result
Representing the United States
2026	World Indoor Championships	Kuyavian–Pomeranian, Poland	16th	Triple Jump	13.01 m (42 ft 8 in)

Year	Competition	Venue	Position	Event	Result
2026	USA Indoor Track and Field Championships	Ocean Breeze Athletic Complex, New York	3rd	Triple jump	13.50 m (44 ft 3 in)
