= Ruth Usoro =

Nigerian athlete (born 1997)

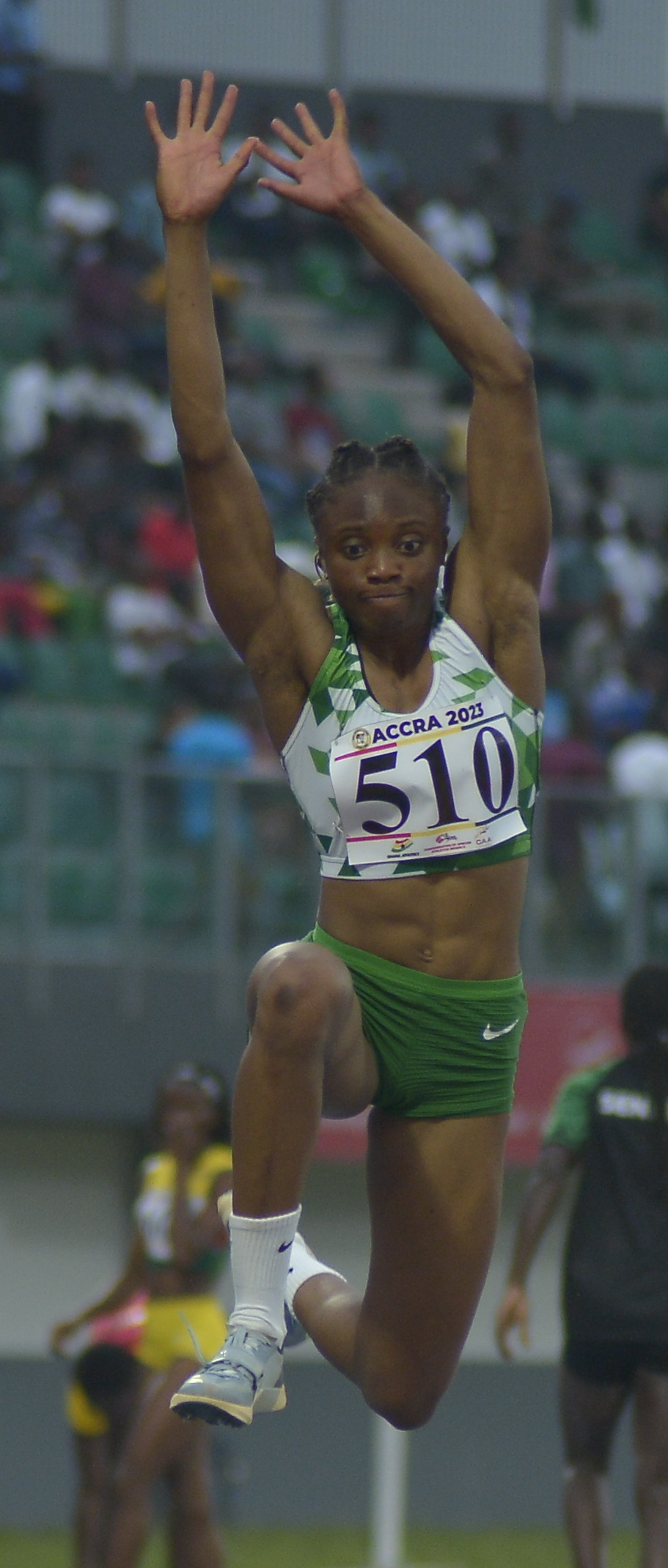
- Ruth Usoro at the 2024 African Games

Personal information
- Nationality: Nigerian
- Born: 8 October 1997 (age 28)

Sport
- Sport: Track and Field
- Events: long jump, triple jump
Medal record
Women's athletics
Representing Nigeria
African Games
Gold medal – first place	2023 Accra	Triple jump
Commonwealth Games
Silver medal – second place	2026 Glasgow	Long jump

Ruth Usoro (born 8 October 1997) is a Nigerian athlete who competes at long jump and triple jump. She won the gold medal in the triple jump at the 2023 African Games and the silver medal in the long jump at the 2026 Commonwealth Games with a jump of 6.87 metres.

== Biography ==
As a student at Texas Tech University, on 26 February 2021, Usoro jumped 6.82m in the long jump to meet the qualifying standard for the delayed 2020 Olympic Games in Tokyo. It was the 2nd best jump in the world for the season at the time and the 3rd best on the Nigerian all-time list alongside Ese Brume.

On 12 June 2021, she jumped 14.19m to win the triple jump at the 2021 NCAA Division I Outdoor Track and Field Championships at Hayward Field, Eugene, Oregon. She also won the NCAA indoor title in 2021. Her personal best triple jump of 14.50 in Texas met the qualifying standard for the delayed 2020 Tokyo Olympics in the triple jump and placed her in the top 10 in the world for the year. Despite arriving in Tokyo to compete at the Olympic Games, Usoro was ruled out when her name was included on a list of ten athletes from her country ineligible to participate due to non-compliance with out-of-competition drug testing requirements in the run-up to the Games. In a statement The Athletics Federation of Nigeria (AFN) took responsibility for the failings and for not putting in place "appropriate measures to comply with rule 15 of the anti-doping rules of World Athletics".

Usoro competed at the 2023 World Athletics Championships long jump in Budapest.

In March 2024, she won gold in the triple jump at the 2023 African Games in Accra. She competed in the long jump at the 2024 Paris Olympics, where she placed tenth overall.

On 1 August 2026, she won the silver medal in the long jump at the 2026 Commonwealth Games in Glasgow, Scotland.
