= Athletics at the 2023 African Games – Women's triple jump =

The women's triple jump event at the 2023 African Games was held on 19 March 2024 in Accra, Ghana.

== Medalists ==
Gold	Silver	Bronze
Ruth Usoro; Nigeria	Winny Bii; Kenya	Saly Sarr; Senegal

== Results ==
Held on 19 March

Rank	Name	Nationality	#1	#2	#3	#4	#5	#6	Result	Notes
1st place, gold medalist(s)	Ruth Usoro	Nigeria	13.23	13.08	13.45	13.80	13.64	13.63	13.80	
2nd place, silver medalist(s)	Winny Bii	Kenya	12.56	13.22	13.47	13.12	13.13	13.64	13.64	
3rd place, bronze medalist(s)	Saly Sarr	Senegal	13.08	13.16	13.31	13.27	12.91	13.60	13.60	
4	Liliane Potiron	Mauritius	13.21	13.31	x	13.10	x	x	13.31	
5	Véronique Kossenda Rey	Cameroon	x	12.89	12.98	12.72	13.26	13.24	13.26	
6	Fayza Issaka Abdou Kerim	Togo	13.18	13.23	12.58	12.10	12.80	12.59	13.23	NR
7	Sangoné Kandji	Senegal	12.83	12.89	13.07	x	x	13.02	13.07	
8	Sylvie Sawadogo	Burkina Faso	12.49	12.51	12.68	12.56	12.66	12.66	12.68	
9	Winfred Atimango	Uganda	11.84	12.44	12.29				12.44	
10	Pwoch Omod Olok	Ethiopia	x	x	12.37				12.37	
11	Betselot Alemayehu Kibret	Ethiopia	11.42	11.10	11.11				11.42	
