= 2026 World Athletics Indoor Championships – Women's triple jump =

Women's triple jump at the 2026 World Athletics Indoor Championships
- Venue: Kujawsko-Pomorska Arena Toruń
- Location: Toruń, Poland
- Dates: 21 March
- Winning distance: 14.95 m

Medalists
gold medal	Leyanis Pérez	Cuba
silver medal	Yulimar Rojas	Venezuela
bronze medal	Saly Sarr	Senegal

The women's triple jump at the 2026 World Athletics Indoor Championships took place on the short track of the Kujawsko-Pomorska Arena Toruń in Toruń, Poland, on 21 March 2026. This was the 19th time the event was contested at the World Athletics Indoor Championships. Athletes could qualify by achieving the entry standard or by their World Athletics Ranking in the event.

== Background ==
The women's triple jump was contested 18 times before 2026, at every previous edition of the World Athletics Indoor Championships since 1991.

Records before the 2026 World Athletics Indoor Championships
Record	Athlete (nation)	Distance (m)	Location	Date
World record	Yulimar Rojas (VEN)	15.74	Belgrade, Serbia	20 March 2022
Championship record	Yulimar Rojas (VEN)	15.74	Belgrade, Serbia	20 March 2022
2026 World Lead	Yulimar Rojas (VEN)	14.95	Valencia, Spain	19 February 2026

== Qualification ==
For the women's triple jump, the qualification period ran from 1 November 2025 until 8 March 2026. Athletes could qualify by achieving the entry standard of 14.15 m. Athletes could also qualify by virtue of their World Athletics Ranking for the event or by virtue of their World Athletics Indoor Tour wildcard. There is a target number of 16 athletes.

== Results ==
=== Final ===
The final was held on 21 March, starting at 19:38 (UTC+1) in the evening.

Results of the final
Place	Athlete	Nation	#1	#2	#3	#4	#5	#6	Result	Notes
1st place, gold medalist(s)	Leyanis Pérez	Cuba	14.88	14.95	14.49	14.77	x	x	14.95	WL
2nd place, silver medalist(s)	Yulimar Rojas	Venezuela	x	14.54	x	14.86	x	14.75	14.86	
3rd place, bronze medalist(s)	Saly Sarr	Senegal	14.41	14.58	14.51	14.70	14.65	14.48	14.70	PB
4	Liadagmis Povea	Cuba	14.23	14.41	14.29	x	14.19	13.85	14.41	SB
5	Thea Lafond	Dominica	14.30	x	14.38	14.33	14.36	14.38	14.38	
6	Ivana Španović	Serbia	14.35	13.87	13.78	13.79	14.03	14.06	14.35	
7	Jasmine Moore	United States	14.33	14.08	14.01	14.02	13.93		14.33	SB
8	Aleksandra Nacheva	Bulgaria	14.05	x	13.66	x	13.72		14.05	SB
9	Elena Taloş	Romania	x	13.85	13.98	x			13.98	
10	Sharifa Davronova	Uzbekistan	13.81	13.62	x	x			13.81	
11	Neja Filipič	Slovenia	x	x	13.35				13.35	
12	Rūta Kate Lasmane	Latvia	x	13.23	13.22				13.23	
13	Alexia Ioana Dospin	Romania	13.20	13.09	12.69				13.20	
14	Charisma Taylor	Bahamas	x	x	13.11				13.11	
15	Georgina Forde-Wells	United Kingdom	x	x	13.06				13.06	
16	Ryann Porter	United States	12.78	13.01	12.73				13.01	
17	Shantae Foreman	Jamaica	11.61	x	12.35				12.35	
