= Winny Bii =

Kenyan athlete (born 2003)

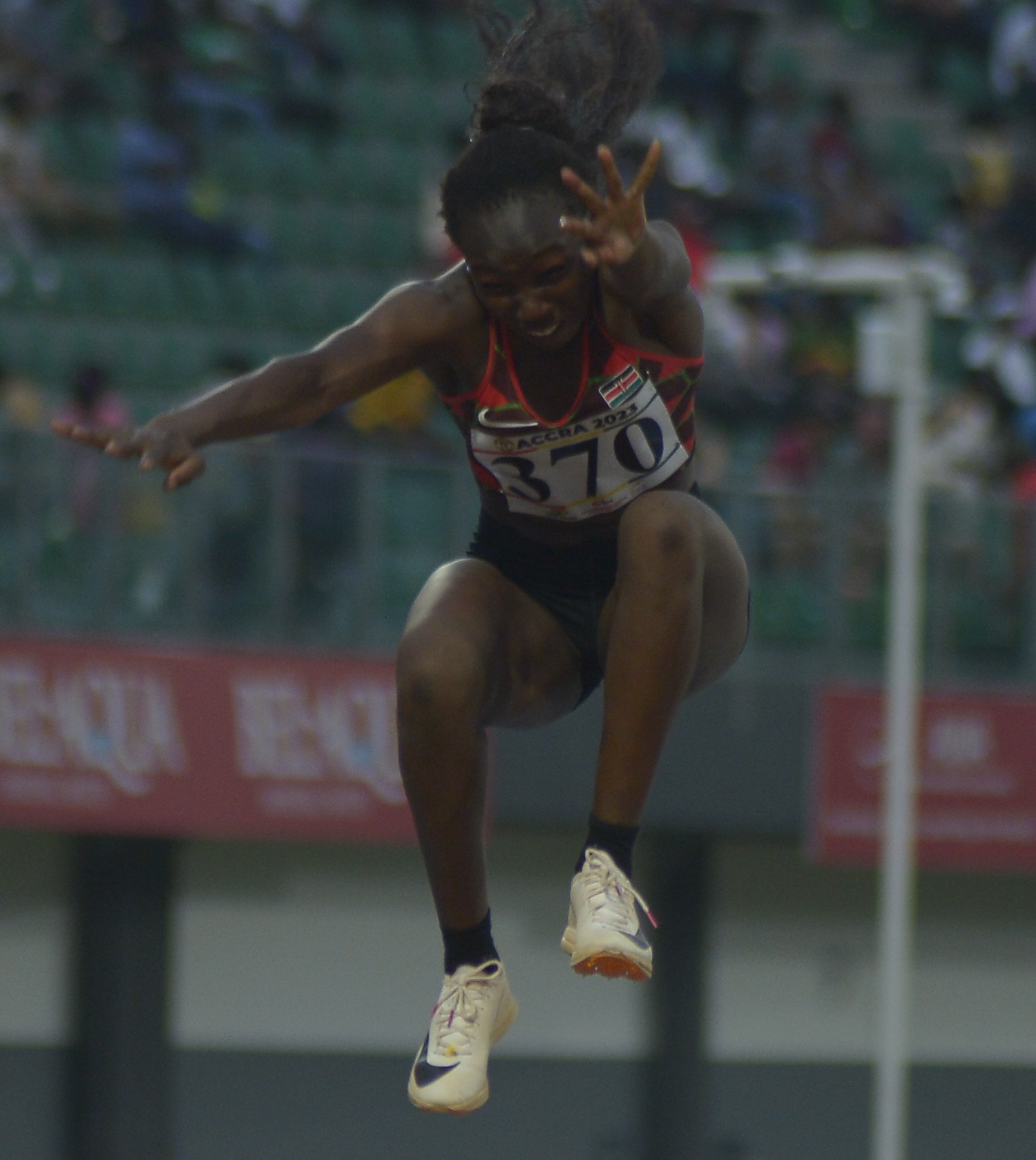
- Bii at the 2023 African Games

Personal information
- Full name: Winny Chepngetich Bii
- Nationality: Kenya
- Born: 27 December 2003 (age 22)

Sport
- Sport: Athletics
- Event(s): Triple Jump, Long jump

Achievements and titles
- Personal bests: Long jump 6.20m (Nairobi, 2022); Triple jump: 14.01m (Clemson, 2025) NR
Medal record
Women's athletics
Representing Kenya
African Games
Silver medal – second place	2023 Accra	Triple jump

Winny Chepngetich Bii (born 27 December 2003) is a Kenyan track and field athlete. She is the Kenyan national record holder in the triple jump.

== Early life ==
From Kericho, she trained at the Kaptere Athletics camp in Kericho County. She later trained in Miramas in France before joining Oklahoma State University.

== Career ==
In 2022, she became the first Kenyan to qualify for the long jump at the World Athletics U20 Championships in Cali, Colombia. She also competed in the triple jump at the event.

In January 2024, competing for Oklahoma State University, Bii set a new national record in the triple jump as she won the Arkansas Invitational at the Randal Tyson Indoor Centre, Fayetteville, Arkansas with a leap of 13.49 metres. She broke the previous record set by Gloria Mulei set in 2019.

In February 2024, she extended her own national triple jump record to 13.66 metres at the Big 12 Indoor Championships. In March 2024, she was a silver medalist in the triple jump at the 2023 African Games in Accra, Ghana with a jump of 13.64 metres.

She jumped 14.01 cm to finish runner-up by a centimetre at the 2025 SEC Championships in Kentucky in May 2025 whilst competing for Texas A&M. She also won the triple jump title at the 2025 NCAA Division I Outdoor Track and Field Championships in June 2025, with a jump of 13.96 metres.
