= 2026 World Athletics Ultimate Championship – Women's triple jump =

Women's triple jump at the 2026 World Athletics Ultimate Championship
- Venue: National Athletics Centre
- Location: Budapest, Hungary
- Dates: 13 September 2026 (final)
- Competitors: 8 from 6 nations
- Winning time: 15.06 m

Champion
- Saly Sarr; Senegal

The women's triple jump was held as a straight final at the 2026 World Athletics Ultimate Championship at the National Athletics Centre in Budapest, Hungary on 13 September 2026. It was the first time the World Ultimate Championship is held. Athletes qualified by wildcard or by their world ranking.

== Background ==
Global records before the 2026 World Athletics Ultimate Championship
| Record | Distance | Athlete (nation) | Location | Date |
|---|---|---|---|---|
| World record | 15.74 m i | Yulimar Rojas (VEN) | Belgrade, Serbia | 20 March 2022 |
| World lead | 15.25 | Thea Lafond (DMA) | Zagreb, Croatia | 26 June 2026 |

Area records before the 2026 World Athletics Ultimate Championship
| Record | Distance | Athlete (nation) | Location | Date |
|---|---|---|---|---|
| African record | 15.39 m | Françoise Mbango Etone (CMR) | Beijing, China | 17 August 2008 |
| Asian record | 15.25 m | Olga Rypakova (KAZ) | Split, Croatia | 26 October 2009 |
| European record | 15.50 m | Inessa Kravets (UKR) | Gothenburg, Sweden | 10 August 1995 |
| North, Central American, and Caribbean record | 15.29 m | Yamilé Aldama (CUB) | Rome, Italy | 11 July 2003 |
| Oceanian record | 14.04 m | Nicole Mladenis (AUS) | Hobart, Australia | 9 March 2002 |
| Oceanian record | 14.04 m | Nicole Mladenis (AUS) | Perth, Australia | 7 December 2003 |
| South American record | 15.74 m i | Yulimar Rojas (VEN) | Belgrade, Serbia | 20 March 2022 |

== Qualification ==
For the triple jump, eight athletes qualified, up to three by wildcard for winners of the event at the 2024 Summer Olympic, the 2025 World Athletics Championships, or the 2026 Diamond League final and the others by their position at the World Athletics Rankings for the event on 3 September 2026.

== Results ==
=== Final ===
The final was held on 13 September at 19:34 (UTC+2).

| Place | Athlete | Nation | Round | | | | Result | Notes |
| Place | Athlete | Nation | #1 | #2 | #3 | #4 | Result | Notes |
|---|---|---|---|---|---|---|---|---|
| 1st place, gold medalist(s) | Saly Sarr | Senegal | 15.06 (+0.3 m/s) | x | 14.92 (+0.4 m/s) | 14.83 (−0.1 m/s) | 15.06 m (+0.3 m/s) | |
| 2 | Davisleydi Velazco | Cuba | 14.83 (+0.6 m/s) | x | 15.04 (+0.5 m/s) | 14.44 (−0.2 m/s) | 15.04 m (+0.5 m/s) | |
| 3 | Leyanis Pérez | Cuba | 14.88 (+0.6 m/s) | 14.90 (+0.7 m/s) | 14.66 (+0.8 m/s) | - | 14.90 m (+0.7 m/s) | |
| 4 | Thea LaFond | Dominica | 14.26 (+0.3 m/s) | 14.09 (+0.8 m/s) | 14.47 (−0.1 m/s) | 14.09 (−0.5 m/s) | 14.47 m (−0.1 m/s) | |
| 5 | Ackelia Smith | Jamaica | 13.66 (+0.3 m/s) | 14.17 (+0.6 m/s) | 14.23 (+0.3 m/s) | | 14.23 m (+0.3 m/s) | |
| 6 | Dariya Derkach | Italy | 13.82 (−0.3 m/s) | x | 13.52 (±0.0 m/s) | | 13.82 m (−0.3 m/s) | |
| 7 | Gabriele dos Santos | Brazil | 13.06 (+1.2 m/s) | x | | | 13.06 m (+1.2 m/s) | |
| — | Liadagmis Povea | Cuba | x | x | | | NM | |
