= 2026 Doha Diamond League =

Athletics meeting in Doha, Qatar

- Dates: 19 June 2026
- Host city: Doha, Qatar
- Venue: Suheim bin Hamad Stadium
- Level: 2026 Diamond League

The 2026 Doha Diamond League was the 28th edition of the annual outdoor track and field meeting in Doha, Qatar. Held on 19 June at Suheim bin Hamad Stadium, it was the seventh leg of the 2026 Diamond League – the highest level international track and field circuit. Originally scheduled to take place on 8 May, the meet was postponed to 19 June due to security concerns amid the 2026 Iran war.

== Diamond+ events results ==
=== Men's ===
110 Metres hurdles
Place	Athlete	Nation	Time	Points	Notes
1st place, gold medalist(s)	Cordell Tinch	United States	13.23	8	
2nd place, silver medalist(s)	Asier Martínez	Spain	13.27	7	SB
3rd place, bronze medalist(s)	Thomas Wilkes	France	13.28	6	PB
4	Enrique Llopis	Spain	13.31	5	SB
5	Kendry Menéndez	Cuba	13.41	4	
6	Romain Lecoeur	France	13.46	3	
7	Just Kwaou-Mathey	France	13.57	2	SB
8	Jamal Britt	United States	13.85	1	
			Wind: (+1.4 m/s)		

3000 Metres steeplechase
Place	Athlete	Nation	Time	Points	Notes
1st place, gold medalist(s)	Soufiane El Bakkali	Morocco	8:09.28	8	
2nd place, silver medalist(s)	Samuel Firewu	Ethiopia	8:10.44	7	SB
3rd place, bronze medalist(s)	Daniel Arce	Spain	8:13.35	6	
4	Abraham Kibiwot	Kenya	8:15.49	5	
5	Abrham Sime	Ethiopia	8:16.90	4	
6	Niklas Buchholz	Germany	8:18.40	3	
7	Hailemariyam Amare	Ethiopia	8:22.84	2	SB
8	Ahmed Jaziri	Tunisia	8:23.47	1	
9	Zakariya Girma	Ethiopia	8:35.68		SB
10	Amos Serem	Kenya	8:41.52		SB
—	Eisa Girma	Ethiopia	DNF		
—	Faid El Mostafa	Morocco	DNF		
—	Geoffrey Kirwa	Kenya	DNF		
—	Samuel Duguna	Ethiopia	DQ		TR23.7.1
—	Abderrafia Bouassel	Morocco	DNF		PM

High jump
Place	Athlete	Nation	Height	Points	Notes
1st place, gold medalist(s)	Matteo Sioli	Italy	2.29 m	8	SB
2nd place, silver medalist(s)	Mutaz Barsham	Qatar	2.27 m	7	SB
3rd place, bronze medalist(s)	Oleh Doroshchuk	Ukraine	2.24 m	6	
4	Raymond Richards	Jamaica	2.20 m	5	
5	Tyus Wilson	United States	2.20 m	4	
6	Erick Portillo	Mexico	2.20 m	3	
7	Jan Štefela	Czech Republic	2.20 m	2	
8	Mateusz Kołodziejski	Poland	2.16 m	1	
9	Yual Reath	Australia	2.12 m		

Pole vault
Place	Athlete	Nation	Height	Points	Notes
1st place, gold medalist(s)	Emmanouil Karalis	Greece	5.92 m	8	
2nd place, silver medalist(s)	Chris Nilsen	United States	5.92 m	7	SB
3rd place, bronze medalist(s)	Sondre Guttormsen	Norway	5.92 m	6	
4	Sam Kendricks	United States	5.82 m	5	
5	KC Lightfoot	United States	5.82 m	4	
6	Seif Heneida	Qatar	5.72 m	3	SB
7	Menno Vloon	Netherlands	5.62 m	2	
8	Zach Bradford	United States	5.42 m	1	
8	EJ Obiena	Philippines	5.42 m	1	

=== Women's ===
100 Metres
Place	Athlete	Nation	Time	Points	Notes
1st place, gold medalist(s)	Kemba Nelson	Jamaica	10.88	8	
2nd place, silver medalist(s)	Zaynab Dosso	Italy	11.01	7	
3rd place, bronze medalist(s)	Patrizia Van der Weken	Luxembourg	11.05	6	
4	Jaël Bestué	Spain	11.07	5	
5	Anavia Battle	United States	11.13	4	
6	María Isabel Pérez	Spain	11.23	3	
7	Destiny Smith-Barnett	Liberia	11.46	2	
8	Dana Noor Salem	Qatar	11.49	1	
			Wind: (+2.5 m/s)		

400 Metres
Place	Athlete	Nation	Time	Points	Notes
1st place, gold medalist(s)	Marileidy Paulino	Dominican Republic	48.91	8	MR, SB
2nd place, silver medalist(s)	Natalia Bukowiecka	Poland	50.10	7	SB
3rd place, bronze medalist(s)	Roxana Gómez	Cuba	50.23	6	
4	Bassant Hemida	Egypt	50.50	5	
5	Martina Weil	Chile	51.05	4	SB
6	Paris Peoples	United States	51.27	3	
7	Skadi Schier	Germany	51.53	2	PB
8	Obakeng Kamberuka	Botswana	51.79	1	

800 Metres
Place	Athlete	Nation	Time	Points	Notes
1st place, gold medalist(s)	Addison Wiley	United States	1:57.98	8	SB
2nd place, silver medalist(s)	Tsige Duguma	Ethiopia	1:58.08	7	
3rd place, bronze medalist(s)	Halimah Nakaayi	Uganda	1:58.41	6	SB
4	Prudence Sekgodiso	South Africa	1:58.61	5	
5	Oratile Nowe	Botswana	1:58.66	4	
6	Nigist Getachew	Ethiopia	1:59.12	3	
7	Rénelle Lamote	France	1:59.21	2	SB
8	Shafiqua Maloney	Saint Vincent and the Grenadines	1:59.48	1	
9	Lorea Ibarzabal	Spain	1:59.84		SB
10	Msgana Hailu	Ethiopia	2:01.47		
11	Lore Hoffmann	Switzerland	2:01.96		
12	Saida Tsehaye	Ethiopia	2:04.22		
—	Lisanne de Witte	Netherlands	DNF		PM

5000 Metres
Place	Athlete	Nation	Time	Points	Notes
1st place, gold medalist(s)	Medina Eisa	Ethiopia	14:53.91		
2nd place, silver medalist(s)	Likina Amebaw	Ethiopia	14:54.37		
3rd place, bronze medalist(s)	Marta Alemayo	Ethiopia	14:55.65		
4	Bernesh Dessie	Ethiopia	14:55.85		SB
5	Hawi Abera	Ethiopia	14:58.43		
6	Nelvin Jepkemboi	Kenya	14:59.68		SB
7	Melknat Wudu	Ethiopia	15:02.13		SB
8	Cynthia Chepkirui	Kenya	15:06.48		PB
9	Aynadis Mebratu	Ethiopia	15:10.60		SB
10	Yenawa Nbret	Ethiopia	15:18.35		
11	María Forero	Spain	15:19.69		
12	Fantaye Belayneh	Ethiopia	15:25.31		
13	Wubrist Aschal	Ethiopia	15:26.21		
14	Mercy Chepngeno Kosgei	Kenya	15:30.00		SB
15	Tirhas Gebrehiwet	Ethiopia	15:46.15 [.142]		SB
16	Mastewal Mehabaw	Ethiopia	15:46.15 [.143]		PB
—	Asayech Ayichew	Ethiopia	DNF		
—	Lemlem Nibret	Ethiopia	DNF		PM

== Diamond events results ==
=== Men's ===
200 Metres
Place	Athlete	Nation	Time	Points	Notes
1st place, gold medalist(s)	Sinesipho Dambile	South Africa	19.74	8	PB
2nd place, silver medalist(s)	Makanakaishe Charamba	Zimbabwe	19.88	7	=PB
3rd place, bronze medalist(s)	Alexander Ogando	Dominican Republic	19.96	6	SB
4	Phaezel Selepe	Botswana	20.01	5	PB
5	Reynier Mena	Cuba	20.04	4	SB
6	Kyree King	United States	20.38	3	
7	Cheickna Traore	Ivory Coast	20.52	2	
8	Robin Ganter	Germany	20.65	1	SB
			Wind: (+1.8 m/s)		

Triple jump
Place	Athlete	Nation	Distance	Points	Notes
1st place, gold medalist(s)	Pedro Pichardo	Portugal	17.71 m (+0.4 m/s)	8	WL
2nd place, silver medalist(s)	Jordan Scott	Jamaica	17.69 m (+1.7 m/s)	7	PB
3rd place, bronze medalist(s)	Yasser Triki	Algeria	17.67 m (+0.4 m/s)	6	NR
4	Andrea Dallavalle	Italy	17.19 m (+0.9 m/s)	5	SB
5	Almir dos Santos	Brazil	17.01 m (+1.4 m/s)	4	
6	Dawoud Jok	South Sudan	16.67 m (+1.0 m/s)	3	PB
7	Nikolaos Andrikopoulos	Greece	16.02 m (+0.6 m/s)	2	
8	Lázaro Martínez	Cuba	15.42 m (+0.5 m/s)	1	

Javelin throw
Place	Athlete	Nation	Distance	Points	Notes
1st place, gold medalist(s)	Rumesh Tharanga	Sri Lanka	88.68 m	8	
2nd place, silver medalist(s)	Anderson Peters	Grenada	86.38 m	7	SB
3rd place, bronze medalist(s)	Curtis Thompson	United States	85.99 m	6	SB
4	Neeraj Chopra	India	85.69 m	5	SB
5	Artur Felfner	Ukraine	83.62 m	4	SB
6	Julius Yego	Kenya	82.22 m	3	SB
7	Keshorn Walcott	Trinidad and Tobago	81.47 m	2	
8	Jakub Vadlejch	Czech Republic	80.38 m	1	
9	Ahmed Mohamed Hussein	Egypt	79.21 m		

=== Women's ===
1500 Metres
Place	Athlete	Nation	Time	Points	Notes
1st place, gold medalist(s)	Birke Haylom	Ethiopia	3:59.89	8	
2nd place, silver medalist(s)	Saron Berhe	Ethiopia	4:02.61	7	
3rd place, bronze medalist(s)	Haregeweyni Kalayu	Ethiopia	4:03.56	6	
4	Gesa Felicitas Krause	Germany	4:04.28	5	PB
5	Águeda Marqués	Spain	4:04.61	4	
6	Gaia Sabbatini	Italy	4:06.24	3	
7	Marta Zenoni	Italy	4:06.25	2	
8	Aster Areri	Ethiopia	4:08.26	1	
9	Worknesh Mesele	Ethiopia	4:08.78		
10	Lorena Martín	Spain	4:09.61		PB
11	Samrawit Mulugeta	Ethiopia	4:19.41		
—	Andrea Rodriguez	Spain	DNF		PM

400 Metres hurdles
Place	Athlete	Nation	Time	Points	Notes
1st place, gold medalist(s)	Emma Zapletalová	Slovakia	52.30	8	WL, MR, NR
2nd place, silver medalist(s)	Rushell Clayton	Jamaica	53.05	7	SB
3rd place, bronze medalist(s)	Kemi Adekoya	Bahrain	53.67	6	SB
4	Gianna Woodruff	Panama	53.88	5	
5	Amalie Iuel	Norway	54.09	4	
6	Ashley Miller	Zimbabwe	54.33	3	
7	Ayomide Folorunso	Italy	54.85	2	SB
8	Eileen Demes	Germany	54.91	1	SB

Triple jump
Place	Athlete	Nation	Distance	Points	Notes
1st place, gold medalist(s)	Davisleydi Velazco	Cuba	15.13 m (+1.3 m/s)	8	WL, PB
2nd place, silver medalist(s)	Leyanis Pérez	Cuba	14.97 m (+2.5 m/s)	7	SB
3rd place, bronze medalist(s)	Saly Sarr	Senegal	14.86 m (+1.2 m/s)	6	PB
4	Liadagmis Povea	Cuba	14.58 m (+1.2 m/s)	5	SB
5	Thea LaFond	Dominica	14.52 m (+0.8 m/s)	4	
6	Ilionis Guillaume	France	13.99 m (+1.3 m/s)	3	
7	Elena Andreea Taloș	Romania	13.99 m (+0.1 m/s)	2	SB
8	Tuğba Danışmaz	Turkey	13.98 m (+1.7 m/s)	1	
9	Neja Filipič	Slovenia	13.94 m (+1.0 m/s)		
10	Caroline Joyeux	Germany	13.94 m (+1.3 m/s)		SB

== See also ==
- 2026 Diamond League
