= Leyanis Pérez =

Cuban athlete (born 2002)

Leyanis Perez
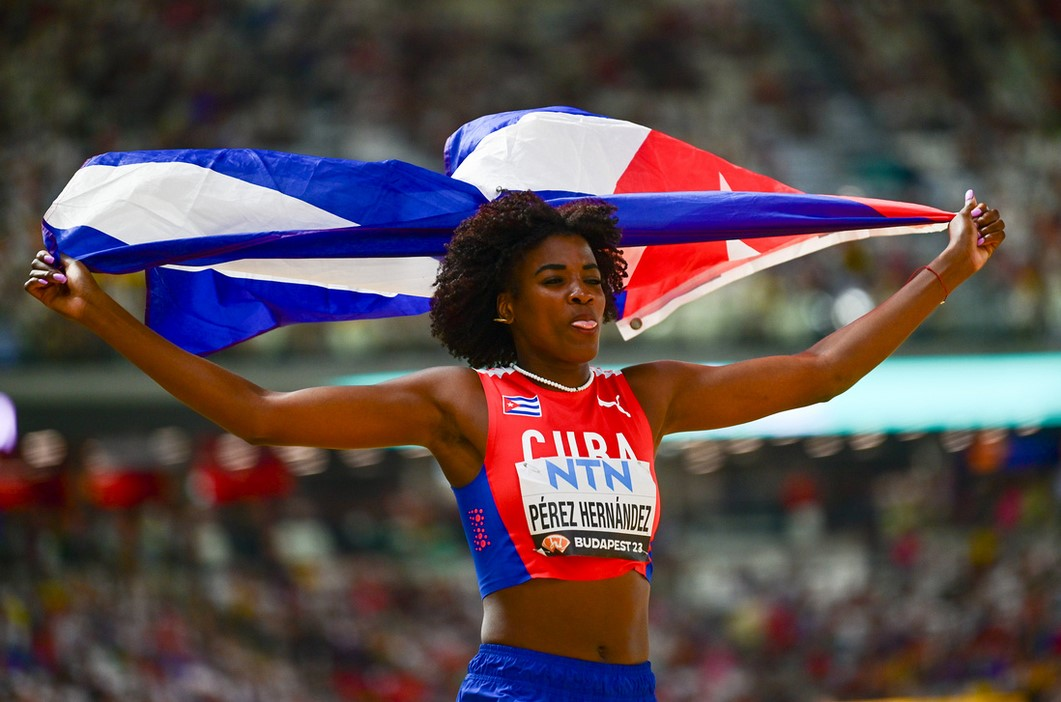
- Leyanis Pérez in 2023

Personal information
- Nationality: Cuban
- Born: Leyanis Perez Hernandez; 10 January 2002 (age 24) Pinar del Río

Sport
- Sport: Track and Field
- Event: triple jump

Achievements and titles
- Personal bests: Long Jump: 6.63m (San Salvador, 2023); Triple Jump 15.06 (Monaco, 2026)
Medal record
Women's athletics
Representing Cuba
World Championships
Gold medal – first place	2025 Tokyo	Triple jump
Bronze medal – third place	2023 Budapest	Triple jump
World Ultimate Championship
Third place	2026 Budapest	Triple jump
World Indoor Championships
Gold medal – first place	2026 Toruń	Triple jump
Gold medal – first place	2025 Nanjing	Triple jump
Silver medal – second place	2024 Glasgow	Triple jump
Diamond League
Gold medal – first place	2024	Triple jump
Gold medal – first place	2025	Triple jump
Second place	2026	Triple jump
Pan American Games
Gold medal – first place	2023 Santiago	Triple jump
Central American and Caribbean Games
Gold medal – first place	2026 Santo Domingo	Triple jump
Pan American U23 Games
Gold medal – first place	2021 Cali	Triple jump
Pan American U20 Championships
Silver medal – second place	2019 San José	Triple jump

Leyanis Pérez Hernández (born 10 January 2002) is a Cuban triple jumper. She is the reigning women's World Champion in the triple jump, both indoors and outdoors, having won gold medals at the 2025 World Athletics Championships and 2025 and 2026 World Athletics Indoor Championships.

== Early life ==
From Pinar del Río, she has a twin sister, Lidianis, who is a handball player. Leyanis joined a sports school at the age of ten years-old and trained in both the high jump and triple jump. In 2018, she focused more on the triple jump and jumped over 14 metres for the first time by leaping 14.13m in her first official competition of 2019.

== Career ==
=== Early career: Junior Pan American champion ===
In 2019, she won a silver medal at the Pan American U20 Championships in San Jose, Costa Rica, in her first international event.

Her jump of 14.15m on 21 March 2020 was the fifteenth longest jump in the world that year, and the world leading distance by a junior. She made the qualifying mark for the delayed 2020 Olympic Games in May 2021 by jumping 14.46m (wind assisted) and then 14.32m. Unfortunately, a late injury meant she traveled to Tokyo but could not compete. She did however, win gold in the triple jump at the Junior Pan American Games in Cali in late 2021.

=== 2022-2024: World Championships medals, Indoors and Outdoors ===
She finished fourth at the 2022 World Athletics Championships and improved her personal best by 12 cm with her second-round 14.70m.

She earned a silver medal at the Central American and Caribbean Games in San Salvador in July 2023, with a personal best of 14.98m. On 28 May, she achieved her first victory at a Diamond League meeting, leaping 14.84m in Rabat. She won the bronze medal at the World Athletics Championships in Budapest in August 2023, with a jump of 14.96m. She won the gold medal at the 2023 Pan American Games in Santiago, Chile in November 2023.

She won silver at the 2024 World Athletics Indoor Championships in Glasgow with a distance of 14.90m.

In May 2024, she won the Prefontaine Classic in Eugene, Oregon with a distance of 14.73 metres. In June 2024, she won the Diamond League event in Stockholm. On 12 July, she jumped 14.96 metres to win at the Herculis Diamond League event in Monaco. She competed in the triple jump at the Paris Olympics, placing fifth overall.

=== 2025: Double World Championship gold medals ===
The following year, she was awarded a wild card place for the World Indoor Championships in Nanjing, China, following her performances on the World Indoor Tour. At the Championships, she won the gold medal in the women's triple jump, with her first round jump of 14.93 metres. She was runner-up with 14.46 metres at the Diamond League event at the Golden Gala in Rome on 6 June 2025. She won the triple jump at the Bislett Games on 12 June and at the Memorial van Damme, in Brussels on 22 August, with jumps of 14.72m and 14.78m, respectively. She won the triple jump with 14.91 metres at the Diamond League Final in Zurich on 28 August.

On 18 September, she won the gold medal in the women's triple jump at the 2025 World Championships in Tokyo, Japan, securing gold with a world leading triple jump distance of 14.94m.

=== 2026: World Indoor title retained ===
On 21 March, Hernandez retained her world title at the 2026 World Athletics Indoor Championships in Toruń, Poland. Her best jump of 14.95 metres was enough to secure the title ahead of Yulimar Rojas and Senegal's Saly Sarr. On 19 June, she jumped a wind-assisted 14.97 m and a wind-legal 14.93 m to place second to compatriot Davisleydi Velazco at the 2026 Doha Diamond League. On 10 July, she surpassed 15 metres with a legal wind for the first time, with 15.06m (-0.1m/s) to win at the 2026 Herculis Diamond League event in Monaco. In August, she won the gold medal in the triple jump at the 2026 CAC Games in Santo Domingo, Dominican Republic. On 23 August, she jumped 14.91m to place second to Sarr in the Diamond League at the 2026 Kamila Skolimowska Memorial in Silesia, Poland. Defending her title at the 2026 Diamond League Final in Brussels on 4 September, she finished runner-up behind Saly Sarr. On 13 September, she placed third behind Sarr and Velazco at the inaugural World Ultimate Championship in Budapest with a jump of 14.90 metres.

== Competition record ==
Year	Competition	Venue	Position	Notes
Representing Cuba
2019	Pan American U20 Championships	San José, Costa Rica	2nd	13.21 m
2021	Olympic Games	Tokyo, Japan	−	DNS
2021	Junior Pan American Games	Cali, Colombia	1st	14.39 m
2022	World Indoor Championships	Belgrade, Serbia	11th	13.99 m
2022	Ibero-American Championships	La Nucía, Spain	1st	14.58 m
2022	World Championships	Eugene, United States	4th	14.70 m
2023	World Championships	Budapest, Hungary	3rd	14.96 m
2023	Pan American Games	Santiago, Chile	1st	14.75 m
2024	World Indoor Championships	Glasgow, United Kingdom	2nd	14.90 m
2024	Olympic Games	Paris, France	5th	14.68 m
2025	World Indoor Championships	Nanjing, China	1st	14.93 m
2025	World Championships	Tokyo, Japan	1st	14.94 m
2026	World Indoor Championships	Toruń, Poland	1st	14.95 m
2026	Central American and Caribbean Games	Santo Domingo, Dominican Republic	1st	14.78 m
2026	World Ultimate Championship	Budapest, Hungary	3rd	14.90 m
