= 2026 Diamond League =

International athletics championship series

- Edition: 17th
- Dates: 16 May – 5 September 2026
- Events: 32
- Meetings: 15
- Individual Prize Money (US$): $9.24 million

The 2026 Diamond League was the seventeenth season of the annual series of outdoor track and field meetings, organised by World Athletics. The competition was a revision to the top level athletics series since Diamond League foundation in 2010. The number of Diamond Discipline events was 32. Each meeting hosted a number of Diamond Discipline events and some of these events would not be broadcast. Events losing Diamond Discipline status would feature on the World Athletics Continental Tour, the second tier of track and field meetings.

Starting in 2025, each meeting nominated 4 events (2 male and 2 female) to be Diamond+ Disciplines, these events will have increased levels of prize money; this will mean at regular meetings a doubling of the 1st place prize from $10,000 to $20,000 and at the Diamond League Finals an increase to $50,000. In 2026, the number of Diamond+ Disciplines per meet was increased from four to eight.

The series concluded with the Diamond League Finals in Brussels, on the 4th and 5th of September 2026, with the winners receiving a bye for the 2026 World Athletics Ultimate Championship.

== Schedule ==
The following fifteen meetings are scheduled to be included in the 2026 season. The Doha Diamond League was originally scheduled to take place at the Qatar Sports Club on May 8, but was rescheduled to take place at the Khalifa International Stadium on June 19 instead.

Leg	Date	Meet	Stadium	City	Country	Diamond events (M+W) Diamond+ events
1	16 May	Shanghai Diamond League	China Textile City Sports Center	Shaoxing	China	7 + 7 = 14; 4 + 4 = 8
2	23 May	Xiamen Diamond League	Xiamen Egret Stadium	Xiamen	China	7 + 7 = 14; 4 + 4 = 8
3	31 May	Meeting International Mohammed VI d'Athlétisme de Rabat	Rabat Olympic Stadium	Rabat	Morocco	7 + 7 = 14; 4 + 4 = 8
4	4 June	Golden Gala Pietro Mennea	Stadio Olimpico	Rome	Italy	7 + 7 = 14; 4 + 4 = 8
5	7 June	Bauhausgalan	Stockholm Olympic Stadium	Stockholm	Sweden	7 + 6 = 13; 4 + 4 = 8
6	10 June	Bislett Games	Bislett Stadium	Oslo	Norway	7 + 7 = 14; 4 + 4 = 8
7	19 June	Doha Diamond League	Khalifa International Stadium	Doha	Qatar	7 + 7 = 14; 4 + 4 = 8
8	28 June	Meeting de Paris	Stade Sébastien Charléty	Paris	France	7 + 7 = 14; 4 + 4 = 8
9	3–4 July	Prefontaine Classic	Hayward Field	Eugene	United States	6 + 8 = 14; 4 + 4 = 8
10	10 July	Herculis EBS	Stade Louis II	Fontvieille	Monaco	7 + 7 = 14; 4 + 4 = 8
11	18 July	London Athletics Meet	London Stadium	London	Great Britain	7 + 7 = 14; 4 + 4 = 8
12	20–21 August	Athletissima	Stade Olympique de la Pontaise	Lausanne	Switzerland	7 + 7 = 14; 4 + 4 = 8
13	22–23 August	Kamila Skolimowska Memorial	Stadion Śląski	Chorzów	Poland	8 + 7 = 15; 4 + 4 = 8
14	26–27 August	Weltklasse Zürich	Letzigrund	Zürich	Switzerland	7 + 7 = 14; 4 + 4 = 8
15	4–5 September	AG Memorial Van Damme	King Baudouin Stadium	Brussels	Belgium	16 + 16 = 32

== Men's results ==
Denotes the event is a Diamond+ discipline
Denotes the event was not included as part of qualification for the Diamond League Finals

=== Track ===
#	Meeting	100 m	200 m	400 m	800 m	1500 m	5000 m	110 m h	400 m h	3000 m st
1	Shanghai/Keqiao	Gift Leotlela (RSA); 9.97 SB	-	-	Mark English (IRL); 1:43.85 MR	-	Mohamed Abdilaahi (GER); 7:25.77; MR, WL, PB (3000 m)	Jamal Britt (USA); 13.07; PB	Alison dos Santos (BRA); 33.01; WL, PB (300 m hurdles)	-
2	Xiamen	Ferdinand Omanyala (KEN); 9.94 SB	-	Collen Kebinatshipi (BOT); 43.92 WL	-	-	Addisu Yihune (ETH); 12:57.32 MR, WL	Jamal Britt (USA); 13.07 PB	Alison dos Santos (BRA); 46.72 WL	-
3	Rabat	-	Kenny Bednarek (USA); 19.69 MR, SB	Jacory Patterson (USA); 44.11 MR, SB	Max Burgin (GBR); 1:42.98 SB	Yared Nuguse (USA); 3:30.35 MR, SB	-	-	-	Soufiane El Bakkali (MAR); 7:57.25 WL
4	Rome	Noah Lyles (USA); 9.88 SB	-	-	Gabriel Tual (FRA); 1:43.66 SB	-	-	Trey Cunningham (USA); 12.98 MR, WL, PB	-	-
5	Stockholm	Jeremiah Azu (GBR); 10.07	Kenny Bednarek (USA); 19.87	Zakithi Nene (RSA); 44.48	Cooper Lutkenhaus (USA); 1:42.70 SB	Yared Nuguse (USA); 3:30.11 SB	-	-	Alison dos Santos (BRA); 47.11	Soufiane El Bakkali (MAR); 8:10.40
6	Oslo	-	Letsile Tebogo (BOT) 19.84	-	Cooper Lutkenhaus (USA); 1:42.08 WL, PB	Timothy Cheruiyot (KEN); 3:48.21 SB (Mile)	Addisu Yihune (ETH); 12:47.62 WL	-	Alison dos Santos (BRA); 46.89	-
7	Doha	-	Sinesipho Dambile (RSA); 19.74 PB	-	-	-	-	Cordell Tinch (USA); 13.23	-	Soufiane El Bakkali (MAR); 8:09.28
8	Paris	Trayvon Bromell (USA); 9.91 SB	-	Collen Kebinatshipi (BOT); 43.54 MR	Marco Arop (CAN); 1:41.84 WL	Cameron Myers (AUS); 3:28.00 AR, WL	Grant Fisher (USA); 12:54.80	Jamal Britt (USA); 12.89 PB	-	Karl Bebendorf (GER); 8:05.55 PB
9	Eugene	Kanyinsola Ajayi (NGR); 9.84 =NR	Tate Taylor (USA); 19.75 PB	Collen Kebinatshipi (BOT); 44.00	Brandon Miller (USA); 1:43.68 SB	Cameron Myers (AUS); 3:46.06 AR (Mile)	Parker Wolfe (USA); 8:10.13 (Two miles)	Jamal Britt (USA); 12.86 MR, PB	-	-
10	Monaco	Oblique Seville (JAM); 9.88	-	Collen Kebinatshipi (BOT); 43.44 DLR, NR	Emmanuel Wanyonyi (KEN); 2:11.83 WR (1000 m)	-	Dominic Lobalu (SUI); 12:53.54 SB	-	-	Simon Koech (KEN); 8:03.35
11	London	Kanyinsola Ajayi (NGR); 9.84 =NR	-	Rai Benjamin (USA); 44.05 PB	Brandon Miller (USA); 1:42.19 PB	Josh Kerr (GBR); 3:42.66 WR (Mile)	-	Ja'Kobe Tharp (USA); 12.89 MR	Karsten Warholm (NOR); 46.61 MR, WL	-
12	Lausanne	-	Letsile Tebogo (BOT) 19.87	-	Emmanuel Wanyonyi (KEN); 1:42.19	-	Birhanu Balew (BHN); 12:57.55	Jamal Britt (USA); 13.13	Rai Benjamin (USA); 46.67 MR	-
13	Silesia	Oblique Seville (JAM); 9.83 MR	-	Collen Kebinatshipi (BOT); 43.59 MR	-	Ethan Strand (USA); 3:30.77 SB	-	Ja'Kobe Tharp (USA); 13.05	Alison dos Santos (BRA); 46.43 WL	Gemechu Godana (ETH); 8:02.74 MR, PB
14	Zürich	-	Kenny Bednarek (USA); 19.62 WL	Yuki Joseph Nakajima (JPN); 44.62 SB	Emmanuel Wanyonyi (KEN); 1:41.76 WL	Cole Hocker (USA); 3:31.71	Parker Wolfe (USA); 7:27.43; MR, PB (3000 m)	Jason Joseph (SUI); 13.11 SB	Alison dos Santos (BRA); 45.80; WR	-
15	Brussels; Final	Oblique Seville (JAM); 9.90	Kenny Bednarek (USA); 19.62 =WL	Collen Kebinatshipi (BOT); 43.40 DLR, NR	Emmanuel Wanyonyi (KEN); 1:41.80 MR	Cameron Myers (AUS); 3:30.14	Birhanu Balew (BHN); 12:45.70 AR, WL	Ja'Kobe Tharp (USA); 13.03	Alison dos Santos (BRA); 46.70 MR	Gemechu Godana (ETH); 8:08.67

=== Field ===
#	Meeting	Long jump	Triple jump	High jump	Pole vault	Shot put	Discus	Javelin
1	Shanghai/Keqiao	Mattia Furlani (ITA); 8.43 m PB	-	-	Armand Duplantis (SWE); 6.12 m MR	-	Kristjan Čeh (SLO); 70.58 m MR	-
2	Xiamen	Miltiadis Tentoglou (GRE); 8.46 m MR, WL	-	-	-	Rajindra Campbell (JAM); 22.34 m NR, PB	-	-
3	Rabat	-	-	-	-	Joe Kovacs (USA); 22.58 m MR, WL	-	Anderson Peters (GRN); 86.08 m SB
4	Rome	Bozhidar Sarâboyukov (BUL); 8.26 m	Andy Díaz Hernández (ITA); 17.59 m SB	Matteo Sioli (ITA); 2.28 m SB	-	Leonardo Fabbri (ITA); 22.14 m	-	Rumesh Tharanga Pathirage (SRI); 92.62 m MR, NR, WL
5	Stockholm	-	-	-	Kurtis Marschall (AUS); 5.90 m	-	Daniel Ståhl (SWE); 69.60 m SB	-
6	Oslo	-	Jordan Scott (JAM); 17.66 m	-	Kurtis Marschall (AUS); 5.82 m	-	-	-
7	Doha	-	Pedro Pichardo (POR); 17.71 m	Matteo Sioli (ITA); 2.29 m SB	Emmanouil Karalis (GRE); 5.92 m	-	-	Rumesh Tharanga Pathirage (SRI); 88.68 m
8	Paris	-	-	-	Armand Duplantis (SWE); 6.13 m MR	-	-	-
9	Eugene	-	-	-	-	Leonardo Fabbri (ITA); 22.74 m WL	Mykolas Alekna (LTU); 71.06 m SB	-
10	Monaco	Miltiadis Tentoglou (GRE); 8.61 m MR, WL	-	Oleh Doroshchuk (UKR); 2.32 m	Armand Duplantis (SWE); 6.07 m MR	-	-	-
11	London	-	-	-	Sam Kendricks (USA); 5.95 m SB	-	-	-
12	Lausanne	Miltiadis Tentoglou (GRE); 8.24 m	Pedro Pichardo (POR); 17.44 m	-	Armand Duplantis (SWE); 6.21 m MR	-	-	Rumesh Tharanga Pathirage (SRI); 88.14 m
13	Silesia	-	-	Gianmarco Tamberi (ITA); 2.31 m	Armand Duplantis (SWE); 6.20 m	Leonardo Fabbri (ITA); 22.08 m	Mykolas Alekna (LTU); 72.58 m DLR	-
14	Zürich	Miltiadis Tentoglou (GRE); 8.45 m	-	-	Armand Duplantis (SWE); 6.25 m MR	Jordan Geist (USA); 22.53 m PB	-	Rumesh Tharanga Pathirage (SRI); 92.07 m
15	Brussels; Final	Tajay Gayle (JAM); 8.46 m SB	Andy Díaz Hernández (ITA); 17.74 m MR	Mateusz Kołodziejski (POL); 2.28 m	Emmanouil Karalis (GRE); 6.12 m MR	Rajindra Campbell (JAM); 23.08 m MR, NR, WL	Kristjan Čeh (SLO); 71.29 m MR	Rumesh Tharanga Pathirage (SRI); 89.04 m

== Women's results ==
Denotes the event is a Diamond+ discipline
Denotes the event was not included as part of qualification for the Diamond League Finals

=== Track ===
#	Meeting	100 m	200 m	400 m	800 m	1500 m	5000 m	100 m h	400 m h	3000 m st
1	Shanghai/Keqiao	-	Shericka Jackson (JAM); 22.07 SB	Nickisha Pryce (JAM); 49.75 SB	-	Birke Haylom (ETH); 3:55.56 MR, SB	Faith Kipyegon (KEN); 14:24.14 SB	Masai Russell (USA); 12.25 MR, SB	-	Peruth Chemutai (UGA); 8:51.47 MR, SB
2	Xiamen	-	Shericka Jackson (JAM); 21.87 SB	-	-	Abbey Caldwell (AUS); 3:57.26	-	Masai Russell (USA); 12.14 AR, DLR, WL	-	Peruth Chemutai (UGA); 8:51.06 MR, WL
3	Rabat	Tina Clayton (JAM); 10.85 SB	Cambrea Sturgis (USA); 22.21 SB	-	Audrey Werro (SUI); 1:56:56 MR, SB	Freweyni Hailu (ETH); 3:58.25 SB	-	Tobi Amusan (NGR); 12.28 MR, =SB	Emma Zapletalová (SVK); 52.82 WL, NR	-
4	Rome	-	Julien Alfred (LCA); 21.93	Henriette Jæger (NOR); 49.60 SB	-	Georgia Hunter Bell (GBR); 3:58.63 SB	Likina Amebaw (ETH); 14:18.41 WL, PB	Megan Simmonds (JAM); 12.50 SB	Emma Zapletalová (SVK); 52.58 WL, NR	-
5	Stockholm	Melissa Jefferson-Wooden (USA); 10.84 SB	-	-	Audrey Werro (SUI); 1:53.98 DLR, NR, WL	Birke Haylom (ETH); 4:00.68	-	-	-	Marwa Bouzayani (TUN); 8:59.28 MR
6	Oslo	Julien Alfred (LCA); 10.76 w (+3.2 m/s)	-	Henriette Jæger (NOR); 49.52 SB	-	-	Freweyni Hailu (ETH); 8:24.22 WL (3000 m)	-	Emma Zapletalová (SVK); 53.13	-
7	Doha	Kemba Nelson (JAM); 10.88 w (+2.5 m/s)	-	Marileidy Paulino (DOM); 48.91 MR, SB	Addison Wiley (USA); 1:57.98 SB	Birke Haylom (ETH); 3:59.89	Medina Eisa (ETH); 14:53.91	-	Emma Zapletalová (SVK); 52.30 MR, NR, WL	-
8	Paris	-	-	Marileidy Paulino (DOM); 48.48 DLR, WL	Audrey Werro (SUI); 1:53.80 DLR, NR, WL	Georgia Hunter Bell (GBR); 3:55.65 SB	-	Tobi Amusan (NGR); 12.28 =SB	-	-
9	Eugene	Melissa Jefferson-Wooden (USA); 10.78 SB	-	Dejanea Oakley (JAM); 49.64	Lilian Odira (KEN); 1:56.19 SB	Nikki Hiltz (USA); 4:17.49 WL (Mile)	Aleshign Baweke (ETH); 9:20.02 WL (Two miles)	Masai Russell (USA); 12.24 =MR	-	Faith Cherotich (KEN); 8:51.74
10	Monaco	-	Julien Alfred (LCA); 21.51 MR, NR, WL	Marileidy Paulino (DOM); 48.67 MR	-	-	Agnes Ngetich (KEN); 8:08.95 MR, WL, PB (3000 m)	Masai Russell (USA); 12.20 MR	-	-
11	London	-	Julien Alfred (LCA); 21.66 MR	Marileidy Paulino (DOM); 48.97	Keely Hodgkinson (GBR); 1:56.21	-	Jessica Hull (AUS); 8:24.69 (3000 m)	-	-	-
12	Lausanne	-	Kayla White (USA); 22.18	-	Audrey Werro (SUI); 1:55:33 MR	-	-	Masai Russell (USA); 12.27 MR	Emma Zapletalová (SVK); 52.41	Winfred Yavi (BHR); 9:00.04 MR
13	Silesia	Melissa Jefferson-Wooden (USA); 10.78 =SB	-	Marileidy Paulino (DOM); 48.87	-	Tsige Duguma (ETH); 3:55.06 WL, PB	Nadia Battocletti (ITA); 14:54.09 MR	Alaysha Johnson (USA); 12.52	-	-
14	Zürich	Julien Alfred (LCA); 10.70 NR	Fabienne Hoenke (SUI); 22.53	-	Audrey Werro (SUI); 1:53.70 DLR, NR, WL	Ludovica Cavalli (ITA); 4:03.27	-	Masai Russell (USA); 12.09 WR	Anna Cockrell (USA); 52.13 MR, WL	Faith Cherotich (KEN); 8:55.82
15	Brussels; Final	Tina Clayton (JAM); 10.93	Julien Alfred (LCA); 21.79	Marileidy Paulino (DOM); 48.64 MR	Audrey Werro (SUI); 1:54.75 MR	Klaudia Kazimierska (POL); 3:54:05 MR, NR, WL	Freweyni Hailu (ETH); 14:35.20	Masai Russell (USA); 12.20 MR	Anna Cockrell (USA); 53.01	Faith Cherotich (KEN); 8:51.61 MR

=== Field ===
#	Meeting	Long jump	Triple jump	High jump	Pole vault	Shot put	Discus	Javelin
1	Shanghai/Keqiao	Monae' Nichols (USA); 6.89 m	-	-	-	Jessica Schilder (NED); 21.09 m DLR, NR, WL	-	-
2	Xiamen	-	-	Yuliya Levchenko (UKR); 1.99 m SB	-	-	Valarie Sion (USA); 68.45 m	Yan Ziyi (CHN); 71.74 m WU20R, AR, DLR, WL
3	Rabat	-	-	Yaroslava Mahuchikh (UKR); 1.97 m	Nina Kennedy (AUS); 4.80 m SB	-	Valarie Sion (USA); 68.75 m MR	-
4	Rome	-	-	-	Molly Caudery (GBR); 4.80 m SB	-	-	-
5	Stockholm	Hilary Kpatcha (FRA); 6.85 m	-	-	-	Jessica Schilder (NED); 20.89 m MR	Valarie Sion (USA); 68.60 m	-
6	Oslo	-	Davisleydi Velazco (CUB); 14.85 m	-	-	Chase Jackson (USA); 20.74 m MR, SB	-	Yan Ziyi (CHN); 67.11 m
7	Doha	-	Davisleydi Velazco (CUB); 15.13 m WL, PB	-	-	-	-	-
8	Paris	-	-	-	Angelica Moser (SUI); 4.77 m	Sarah Mitton (CAN); 19.99 m	-	Yan Ziyi (CHN); 67.44 m
9	Eugene	Tara Davis-Woodhall (USA); 7.13 m	-	-	Sandi Morris (USA); 4.85 m SB	Chase Jackson (USA); 20.56 m	Valarie Sion (USA); 68.64 m	-
10	Monaco	-	Leyanis Pérez Hernández (CUB); 15.06 m PB	-	Nina Kennedy (AUS); 4.95 m AR, WL	-	-	Yan Ziyi (CHN); 68.75 m
11	London	Malaika Mihambo (GER); 7.05 m	-	Nicola Olyslagers (AUS); 2.01 m	-	-	Cierra Jackson (USA); 71.72 m DLR, PB	-
12	Lausanne	-	-	-	Hana Moll (USA); 4.84 m	-	-	Haruka Kitaguchi (JPN); 64.90 m SB
13	Silesia	Alyssa Jones (USA); 6.98 m =MR	Saly Sarr (SEN); 15.08 m NR	Yaroslava Mahuchikh (UKR); 2.00 m =MR	-	Chase Jackson (USA); 20.92 m MR, SB	-	-
14	Zürich	-	-	Nicola Olyslagers (AUS); 2.02 m SB	Hana Moll (USA); 4.90 m PB	-	-	-
15	Brussels; Final	Monae' Nichols (USA); 6.91 m	Saly Sarr (SEN); 14.96 m	Eleanor Patterson (AUS); 2.01 m	Hana Moll (USA); 4.91 m PB	Chase Jackson (USA); 21.14 m DLR, AR, WL	Feng Bin (CHN); 67.46 m SB	Yan Ziyi (CHN); 68.42 m MR
