= Véronique Kossenda Rey =

Cameroonian athlete

Veronique Kossenda Rey
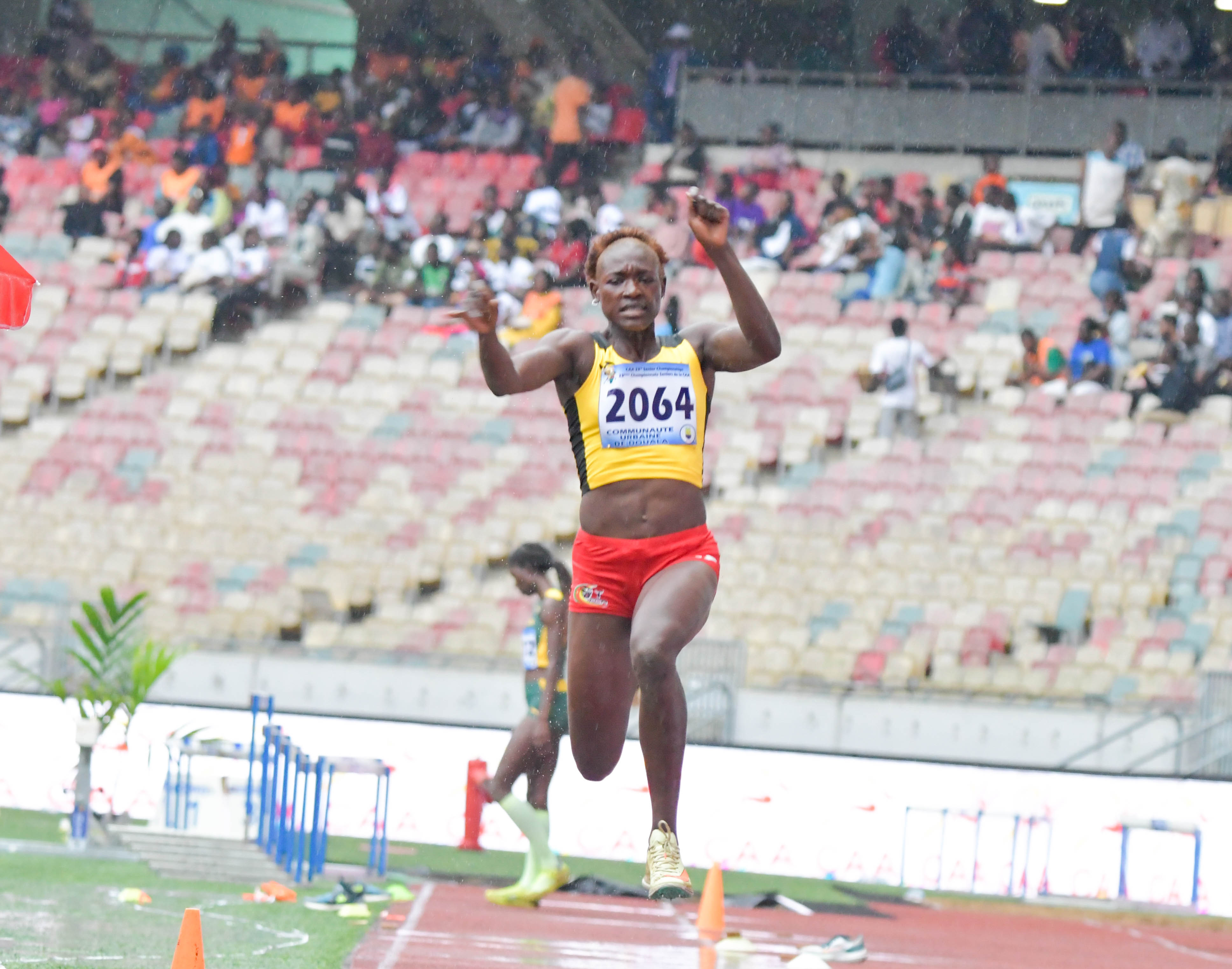
- African Athletics Championships 2024

Personal information
- Nationality: Cameroonian
- Born: Veronique Kossenda Rey; 23 September 1996 (age 29) Cameroon

Sport
- Country: Cameroon
- Sport: Track and field
- Events: Triple Jump; Long Jump

Achievements and titles
- Regional finals: 2022 African Athletics Championships 2023 Francophone Games 2024 African Athletics Championships
- Highest world ranking: 57
- Personal bests: 13.97m (Triple Jump); 6.42m (Long Jump)
Medal record
Representing Cameroon
African Championships
Bronze medal – third place	2022 Saint Pierre	Triple Jump
Representing Cameroon
Francophone Games
Silver medal – second place	2023 Kinshasa	Triple Jump
Representing Cameroon
Francophone Games
Bronze medal – third place	2023 Kinshasa	Long Jump
Representing Cameroon
African Championships
Bronze medal – third place	2024 Douala	Triple Jump

Veronique Kossenda Rey (born 23 September 1996) is a Cameroonian track and field athlete specializing in the triple jump and long jump disciplines. She finished second in the triple jump and third in the long jump at the 2023 Francophone Games in Kinshasa, Democratic Republic of the Congo. Her participation in the African championships have also been very significant having finished third in the Triple Jump at the 2022 African Championships in Saint Pierre, and third in the 2024 African championships in Douala, Cameroon as well. She also finished fifth at the 2024 African Games in Accra, Ghana.

== Biography ==
Veronique Kossenda Rey was born on the 23rd of September 1996 in Cameroon.
