= World Athletics Ultimate Championship =

International biennial track and field sporting event

- Status: Active
- Genre: sports event
- Date: Varying
- Frequency: Biennial
- Location: Varying
- Inaugurated: 2026
- Organiser: World Athletics
- Website: World Athletics Ultimate Championship
- 2026 World Athletics Ultimate Championship

The World Athletics Ultimate Championship is a biennial track and field invitational event held by World Athletics. Announced in June 2024, it is a season-ending meet that will be held in even-numbered years between World Athletics Championships. The meet will have a streamlined format oriented towards television audiences, and limited fields for individual events consisting of defending Olympic, world, and Diamond League champions, and entrants determined by the World Athletics Rankings.

The inaugural World Athletics Ultimate Championship was held 11–13 September 2026 in Budapest, Hungary.

== History ==
In June 2024, World Athletics announced that it would hold a new biennial event known as the World Athletics Ultimate Championship, with the inaugural edition to be held in Budapest, Hungary in September 2026 following the Diamond League final; the event is intended to serve as a season-closing meet featuring limited fields of top athletes, and will take place in even-numbered years when the World Athletics Championships are not being held. It is being designed to appeal to younger demographics and television audiences, with a focus on fast-paced sessions lasting less than three hours each, and events determined to be popular among viewers. The inaugural Ultimate Championship will have a total purse of US$10 million, with gold medalists to be awarded US$150,000 each.

President Sebastian Coe stated that the Ultimate Championship was part of an effort by World Athletics to "remain interesting" and "create new formats that keep our sport at the top of people's consciousness." Swedish-American pole vaulter Armand Duplantis and Jamaican sprinter Usain Bolt were named as ambassadors for the inaugural edition, billed as "Ultimate Star" and "Ultimate Legend" respectively.

== Format ==
The Ultimate Championship features limited fields in each discipline, with a quota of sixteen athletes for individual track events, eight athletes for field events, and eight teams for relays. For individual events, invites are extended to champions from the most recent Summer Olympics, world championships, and Diamond League final, with the remainder of the field determined by the World Athletics Rankings during the one-year ranking period ending prior to the Diamond League final. There is no limit on how many entrants may come from a single country.

For relay events, the World Athletics Relays are used as direct qualifiers for the Ultimate Championship, with the top six finishers advancing, and the final two teams chosen based on performance over the past year. Unlike individual events, a single country may only be represented by one team.

The disciplines for the inaugural event were announced in November 2024; to ensure a faster pace, the Ultimate Championship features only 28 events, leaving out long-distance events such as the 10,000 metres and the steeplechase, and focusing on field events that were determined to be the most popular among viewers at previous World Athletics Championships.

Field events (except vertical jumps) use a more compact format than standard competitions: two rounds for all eight athletes, then a third round for the top-6 athletes, and a final, fourth round for the top-4, with the order changing from highest to lowest mark after each round.

Men's disciplines
| Track events | Field events |
|---|---|
| 100 metres | Pole vault |
| 200 metres | High jump |
| 400 metres | Long jump |
| 800 metres | Hammer throw |
| 1500 metres | Javelin throw |
5000 metres
110 metres hurdles
400 metres hurdles

Women's disciplines
| Track events | Field events |
|---|---|
| 100 metres | Pole vault |
| 200 metres | High jump |
| 400 metres | Long jump |
| 800 metres | Triple jump |
| 1500 metres | Javelin throw |
5000 metres
100 metres hurdles
400 metres hurdles

Mixed-sex disciplines
Track events
4 × 100 metres relay
4 × 400 metres relay

== Championships ==
| Edition | Year | Host | Date | Venue | No. of events | No. of countries | No. of athletes | Top of the medal table |
|---|---|---|---|---|---|---|---|---|
| 1 | 2026 | (Hungary) Budapest | 11-13 September | National Athletics Centre | 28 | 65 | 381 | United States |

== All time champion table ==
After 2026 World Athletics Ultimate Championship.

| Rank | Nation | Total |
|---|---|---|
| 1 | United States | 10 |
| 2 | Italy | 2 |
| 3 | Algeria | 1 |
| 3 | Botswana | 1 |
| 3 | Brazil | 1 |
| 3 | Dominican Republic | 1 |
| 3 | Ethiopia | 1 |
| 3 | Germany | 1 |
| 3 | Great Britain | 1 |
| 3 | Greece | 1 |
| 3 | Japan | 1 |
| 3 | Norway | 1 |
| 3 | Poland | 1 |
| 3 | Senegal | 1 |
| 3 | Sri Lanka | 1 |
| 3 | Sweden | 1 |
| 3 | Switzerland | 1 |
| 3 | Ukraine | 1 |
