= 2016 European Athletics Championships – Women's long jump =

Women's long jump at the European Athletics Championships
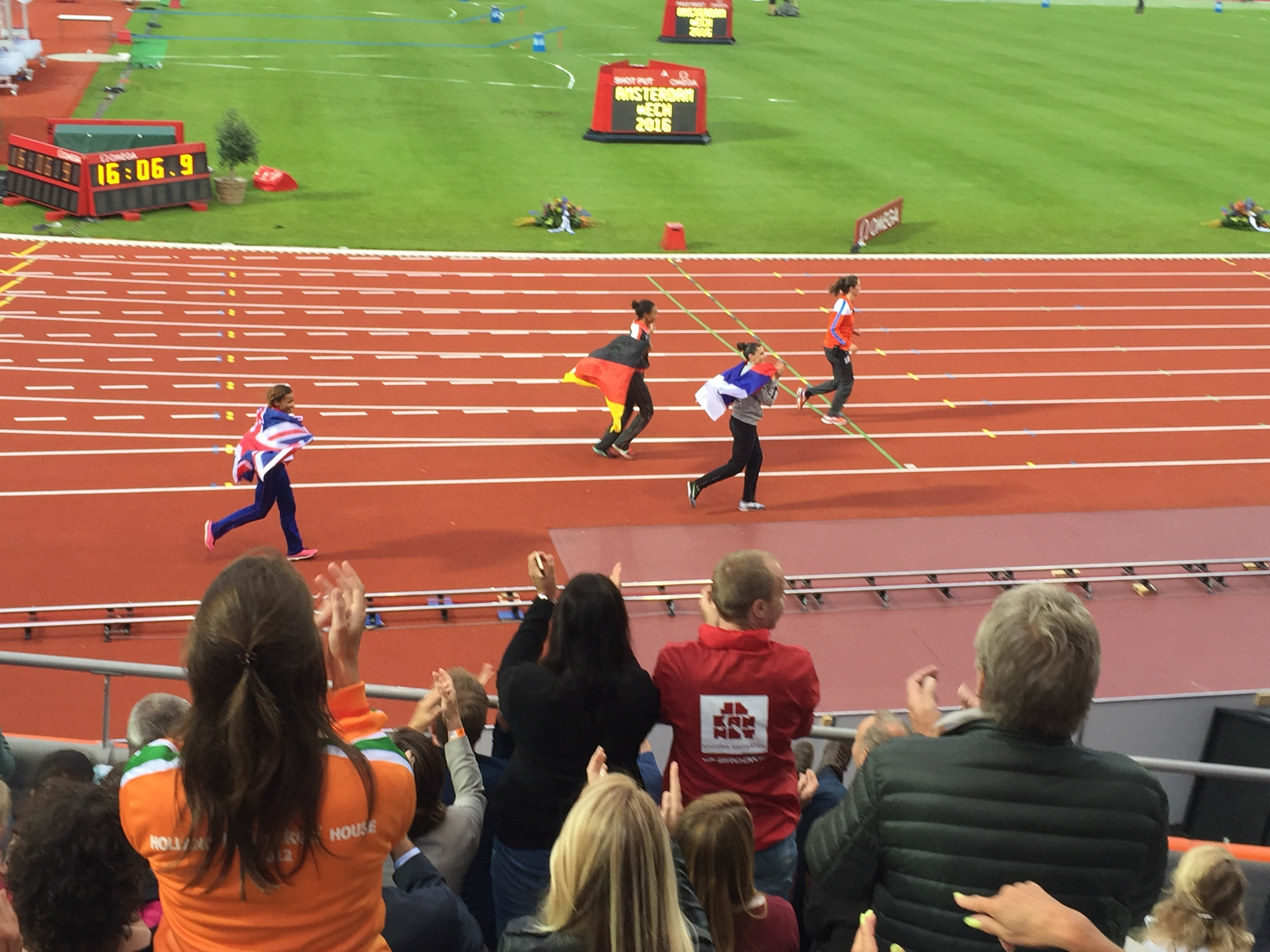
- Venue: Olympic Stadium
- Location: Amsterdam
- Dates: 6 July (qualification); 8 July (final)
- Competitors: 26 from 16 nations
- Winning mark: 6.94 m

Medalists
gold medal	Ivana Španović	Serbia
silver medal	Jazmin Sawyers	Great Britain
bronze medal	Malaika Mihambo	Germany

The women's long jump at the 2016 European Athletics Championships took place at the Olympic Stadium on 6 and 8 July.

== Records ==
Standing records prior to the 2016 European Athletics Championships
World record	Galina Chistyakova (URS)	7.52 m	Leningrad, Soviet Union	11 June 1988
European record	Galina Chistyakova (URS)	7.52 m	Leningrad, Soviet Union	11 June 1988
Championship record	Heike Drechsler (GDR)	7.30 m	Split, Yugoslavia	28 August 1990
World Leading	Sosthene Moguenara (GER)	7.16 m	Weinheim, Germany	28 May 2016
European Leading	Sosthene Moguenara (GER)	7.16 m	Weinheim, Germany	28 May 2016

== Schedule ==
Date	Time	Round
6 July 2016	18:40	Qualification
8 July 2016	19:20	Final

All times are local times (UTC+2)

== Results ==
=== Qualification ===
Qualification: 6.60 m (Q) or best 12 performers (q)

Rank	Group	Name	Nationality	#1	#2	#3	Result	Note
1	A	Ivana Španović	Serbia	6.90			6.90	Q
2	A	Malaika Mihambo	Germany	6.29	6.55	6.76	6.76	Q, SB
3	A	Ksenija Balta	Estonia	6.32	x	6.64	6.64	Q, SB
4	B	Karin Melis Mey	Turkey	x	6.46	6.55w	6.55w	q
5	A	Alexandra Wester	Germany	6.53	6.39w	6.06	6.53	q
6	B	Maryna Bekh	Ukraine	6.31	6.35	6.50	6.50	q
7	A	Jazmin Sawyers	Great Britain	x	6.48	6.49	6.49	q
8	B	Nadia Akpana Assa	Norway	5.90	6.24	6.48w	6.48w	q
9	A	Jana Veldáková	Slovakia	x	6.45	6.47w	6.47w	q
10	B	Khaddi Sagnia	Sweden	5.03	x	6.47	6.47	q
11	B	Nadja Käther	Germany	6.44	6.46	6.36	6.46	q
12	A	Anna Kornuta	Ukraine	x	6.46	6.41	6.46	q
13	B	María del Mar Jover	Spain	x	6.43	6.34	6.43	
14	B	Haido Alexouli	Greece	6.23	6.43	x	6.43	
15	B	Hafdís Sigurdardóttir	Iceland	6.11	6.35	6.21	6.35	
16	A	Juliet Itoya	Spain	6.16	6.35w	6.09	6.35w	
17	A	Nektaria Panagi	Cyprus	x	6.24	6.33	6.33	
18	B	Lorraine Ugen	Great Britain	6.33w	x	6.19	6.33w	
19	A	Erica Jarder	Sweden	x	6.33w	x	6.33w	
19	B	Malin Marmbrandt	Sweden	x	6.33w	x	6.33w	
21	A	Neja Filipič	Slovenia	6.24	6.01	6.21w	6.24	
22	B	Anna Lunyova	Ukraine	5.72	6.20w	6.09	6.20w	
23	B	Jogaile Petrokaite	Lithuania	x	6.17	x	6.17	
24	A	Efthimia Kolokitha	Greece	x	5.91w	5.88	5.91w	
	A	Aiga Grabuste	Latvia	x	r		NM	
	B	Shara Proctor	Great Britain				DNS	

=== Final ===
Rank	Athlete	Nationality	#1	#2	#3	#4	#5	#6	Result	Notes
1st place, gold medalist(s)	Ivana Španović	Serbia	x	6.94	6.81	6.71	6.72	x	6.94	
2nd place, silver medalist(s)	Jazmin Sawyers	Great Britain	6.25	6.63	6.86w	6.78w	5.13	x	6.86w	
3rd place, bronze medalist(s)	Malaika Mihambo	Germany	6.50w	6.23	6.63	6.65	6.54	x	6.65	
4	Ksenija Balta	Estonia	6.65	6.61	6.57	6.44	6.48	6.60	6.65	SB
5	Karin Melis Mey	Turkey	6.62	6.48	6.29	6.55	6.42	6.49	6.62	
6	Khaddi Sagnia	Sweden	x	6.59	x	6.37	x	6.41	6.59	
7	Alexandra Wester	Germany	6.51	6.26	6.50w	6.14	6.21	r	6.51	
8	Nadia Akpana Assa	Norway	6.32	6.51	6.45	6.40	6.12	6.13	6.51	
9	Nadja Käther	Germany	6.45	x	6.48w				6.48w	
10	Jana Veldáková	Slovakia	6.27w	6.47w	x				6.47w	
11	Anna Kornuta	Ukraine	6.42	x	x				6.42	
12	Maryna Bekh	Ukraine	x	x	6.29				6.29	
