= 2012 European Athletics Championships – Women's long jump =

Women's long jump at the European Athletics Championships

The women's long jump at the 2012 European Athletics Championships was held at the Helsinki Olympic Stadium on 27 and 28 June.

== Medalists ==
Gold	Éloyse Lesueur; France
Silver	Volha Sudarava; Belarus
Bronze	Margrethe Renstrøm; Norway

== Records ==
Standing records prior to the 2012 European Athletics Championships
World record	Galina Chistyakova (URS)	7.52	Leningrad, Soviet Union	11 June 1988
European record	Galina Chistyakova (URS)	7.52	Leningrad, Soviet Union	11 June 1988
Championship record	Heike Drechsler (GDR)	7.30	Split, Yugoslavia	28 August 1990
World Leading	Brittney Reese (USA)	7.12	Walnut, United States	21 April 2012
European Leading	Anna Nazarova (RUS)	7.11	Moscow, Russia	20 June 2012

== Schedule ==
Date	Time	Round
27 June 2012	9:00	Qualification
28 June 2012	17:25	Final

== Results ==
=== Qualification ===
Qualification: Qualification Performance 6.65 (Q) or at least 12 best performers advance to the final

Rank	Group	Athlete	Nationality	#1	#2	#3	Result	Notes
DQ	A	Karin Melis Mey	Turkey	~~6.66~~			~~6.66~~	Q, ~~SB~~, Doping
1	B	Éloyse Lesueur	France	6.66			6.66	Q
1	A	Margrethe Renstrøm	Norway	x	x	6.66	6.66	Q, SB
3	A	Sosthene Taroum Moguenara	Germany	x	6.29	6.62	6.62	q
4	A	Svetlana Denyayeva	Russia	6.41	5.73	6.53	6.53	q
5	A	Marharyta Tverdohlib	Ukraine	6.12	6.15	6.53	6.53	q
6	B	Volha Sudarava	Belarus	6.29	6.36	6.44	6.44	q
7	B	Irène Pusterla	Switzerland	6.02	6.34	6.44	6.44	q
8	B	Ineta Radēviča	Latvia	6.25	6.44	6.31	6.44	q
9	A	Melanie Bauschke	Germany	x	6.43	6.30	6.43	q
10	A	Jana Velďáková	Slovakia	6.32	6.41	x	6.41	q
11	A	Concepción Montaner	Spain	6.39	6.39	6.34	6.39	q
12	A	Lauma Grīva	Latvia	x	6.37	6.36	6.37	
13	A	Teresa Dobija	Poland	x	6.23	6.36	6.36	
14	A	Ivana Španović	Serbia	x	x	6.33	6.33	
15	B	Nektaria Panayi	Cyprus	x	6.01	6.31	6.31	
16	A	Viorica Țigău	Romania	6.19	x	6.29	6.29	
17	B	María Del Mar Jover	Spain	6.15	4.77	6.27	6.27	
18	B	Oksana Zhukovaskaya	Russia	6.16	5.97	6.26	6.26	
19	A	Cristina Sandu	Romania	6.22	x	x	6.22	
20	B	Alina Rotaru	Romania	6.19	5.99	x	6.19	
21	B	Abigail Irozuru	Great Britain	x	4.22	6.19	6.19	
22	B	Anna Jagaciak	Poland	x	6.16	x	6.16	
23	B	Sinje Florczak	Germany	6.15	5.99	6.11	6.15	
24	B	Viktoriya Molchanova	Ukraine	6.06	5.42	6.12	6.12	
25	A	Krystyna Hryshutyna	Ukraine	x	5.77	6.08	6.08	
26	A	Māra Grīva	Latvia	5.90	6.00	x	6.00	
27	B	Renáta Medgyesová	Slovakia	5.95	x	5.73	5.95	
28	B	Maiko Gogoladze	Georgia	5.71	x	x	5.71	
29	B	Anna Sirvent	Andorra	x	4.27	4.43	4.43	

=== Final ===
Rank	Athlete	Nationality	#1	#2	#3	#4	#5	#6	Result	Notes
1st place, gold medalist(s)	Éloyse Lesueur	France	6.81	x	3.61	6.57	x	x	6.81	SB
2nd place, silver medalist(s)	Volha Sudarava	Belarus	6.59	6.51	x	6.38	6.74	6.51	6.74	
3rd place, bronze medalist(s)	Margrethe Renstrøm	Norway	x	x	6.51	x	6.67	x	6.67	SB
4	Sosthene Taroum Moguenara	Germany	6.59	x	6.53	6.57	6.48	6.66	6.66	
DQ	Karin Melis Mey	Turkey	~~6.60~~	~~6.51~~	~~6.41~~	~~x~~	~~6.62~~	~~6.63~~	~~6.63~~	Doping
5	Ineta Radēviča	Latvia	6.43	x	6.55	x	6.49	6.33	6.55	
6	Irène Pusterla	Switzerland	6.53	6.50	4.96	6.32	6.40	6.25	6.53	
7	Melanie Bauschke	Germany	6.50	x	6.36	6.47	6.34	6.39	6.50	
8	Svetlana Denyayeva	Russia	6.40	x	6.33				6.40	
9	Jana Velďáková	Slovakia	6.16	x	6.31				6.31	
10	Concepción Montaner	Spain	x	6.07	6.26				6.26	
	Marharyta Tverdohlib	Ukraine	x	x	x				NM	
