= Athletics at the 2016 Summer Olympics – Women's long jump =

Women's long jump at the Games of the XXXI Olympiad
- Venue: Olympic Stadium
- Dates: 16 August 2016 (qualifications); 17 August 2016 (final)
- Competitors: 38 from 26 nations
- Winning distance: 7.17 m

Medalists
1st place, gold medalist(s)		Tianna Bartoletta	United States
2nd place, silver medalist(s)		Brittney Reese	United States
3rd place, bronze medalist(s)		Ivana Španović	Serbia

Official Video Highlights

The women's long jump event at the 2016 Summer Olympics took place between 16–17 August at the Olympic Stadium. The winning margin was 2 cm.

== Summary ==
In the final, Malaika Mihambo jumped 6.83 m as the first athlete down the runway. The second jumper was Darya Klishina, the only Russian athlete in the entire athletics competition. Her 6.63 took the second spot. Ksenija Balta jumped 6.71 m as the fourth athlete but that order held until almost the end of the round when Ivana Španović moved on top with 6.95 m.

In the second round Tianna Bartoletta moved into silver medal position with a 6.94 m. Defending champion Brittney Reese jumped a 6.79 m, her only legal jump of the first four rounds, but remained outside of the medals. In the third round, Bartoletta's 1 cm improvement to 6.95 m equalled Španović, with the tiebreaker to put her in gold medal position. On the next jump, Balta equalled Reese, with the same tiebreaker rule pushing her into fifth place.

The fifth round had the real action. First Reese jumped 7.09 to leap from fifth to first. Her mood went from serious to jubilant. Mihambo jumped the third 6.95 of the competition. Then Španović moved right behind Reese with a 7.08 m, her personal best and a new Serbian national record.

On the final jump of the round, Bartoletta jumped the winner 7.17 m (23 ft 6 1/4 in), her personal best in the Olympic final. She moved up to be the number 21 performer in history. Only Reese has jumped further in the last nine years. But Reese wasn't done. She popped another big jump on her last attempt. She was celebrating again, but the measurement turned out to be 7.15 m, improving her hold on silver but didn't reach Bartoletta's gold.

The following evening the medals were presented by Auvita Rapilla, IOC member, Papua New Guinea and Svein Arne Hansen, Council Member of the IAAF.

== Competition format ==
The competition consisted of two rounds, qualification and final. In qualification, each athlete jumped three times (stopping early if they made the qualifying distance). At least the top twelve athletes moved on to the final; if more than twelve reached the qualifying distance, all who did so advanced. Distances were reset for the final round. Finalists jumped three times, after which the eight best jumped three more times (with the best distance of the six jumps counted).

== Records ==
Prior to the competition, the existing World and Olympic records were as follows.

World record	Galina Chistyakova (URS)	7.52 m	Leningrad, USSR	11 June 1988
Olympic record	Jackie Joyner-Kersee (USA)	7.40 m	Seoul, South Korea	29 September 1988
2016 World leading	Brittney Reese (USA)	7.31 m	Eugene, Oregon, United States	2 July 2016

The following national record was established during the competition:

Country	Athlete	Round	Distance	Notes
Serbia	Ivana Španović (SRB)	Final	7.08 m	

== Schedule ==
All times are Brasilia Time (UTC-3)

Date	Time	Round
Tuesday, 16 August 2016	21:05	Qualifications
Wednesday, 17 August 2016	21:15	Finals

=== Qualifying round ===
Qualification rule: qualification standard 6.75m (Q) or at least best 12 qualified (q).

Rank	Group	Name	Nationality	#1	#2	#3	Result	Notes
1	A	Ivana Španović	Serbia	6.87			6.87	Q
2	A	Malaika Mihambo	Germany	6.63	6.82		6.82	Q
3	B	Brittney Reese	United States	6.78			6.78	Q
4	B	Ksenija Balta	Estonia	6.13	6.71	–	6.71	q
5	A	Tianna Bartoletta	United States	6.44	6.70	6.61	6.70	q
6	B	Ese Brume	Nigeria	6.32	6.67	6.49	6.67	q
7	A	Lorraine Ugen	Great Britain	6.44	6.58	6.65	6.65	q
8	A	Darya Klishina	Russia	6.64	x	x	6.64	q
9	B	Brooke Stratton	Australia	6.40	6.46	6.56	6.56	q
10	A	Maryna Bekh	Ukraine	6.49	6.47	6.55	6.55	q
11	A	Sosthene Moguenara	Germany	6.46	x	6.55	6.55	q
12	B	Jazmin Sawyers	Great Britain	6.49	6.36	6.53	6.53	q
13	B	Janay Deloach	United States	6.45	6.50	6.46	6.50	
14	A	Karin Mey Melis	Turkey	6.49	6.43	6.40	6.49	
15	B	Jana Veldakova	Slovakia	6.45	6.48	6.29	6.48	
16	A	Bianca Stuart	Bahamas	6.45	5.40	6.39	6.45	
17	A	Chelsea Jaensch	Australia	6.20	6.35	6.41	6.41	
18	A	Alina Rotaru	Romania	6.40	x	6.38	6.40	
19	B	Anna Kornuta	Ukraine	x	6.34	6.37	6.37	
20	A	Christabel Nettey	Canada	6.05	6.32	6.37	6.37	
21	B	Shara Proctor	Great Britain	6.36	6.34	6.30	6.36	
22	B	Juliet Itoya	Spain	6.35	x	5.69	6.35	
23	B	Eliane Martins	Brazil	6.33	6.24	6.30	6.33	
24	A	Concepción Montaner	Spain	6.23	6.23	6.32	6.32	
25	A	Volha Sudarava	Belarus	6.29	x	x	6.29	
26	B	Maria Natalia Londa	Indonesia	6.21	6.29	6.29	6.29	
27	B	Khaddi Sagnia	Sweden	6.04	6.25	x	6.25	
28	B	Marestella Sunang	Philippines	6.22	6.10	6.15	6.22	
29	A	Yuliya Tarasova	Uzbekistan	x	6.10	6.16	6.16	
30	B	Yvonne Treviño	Mexico	x	6.16	x	6.16	
31	A	Anna Lunyova	Ukraine	6.12	6.15	6.14	6.15	
32	A	Haido Alexouli	Greece	6.07	x	6.13	6.13	
33	B	Lynique Prinsloo	South Africa	5.96	x	6.10	6.10	
34	B	Alexandra Wester	Germany	5.98	x	x	5.98	
35	A	Amaliya Sharoyan	Armenia	5.58	x	5.95	5.95	
36	B	María del Mar Jover	Spain	x	5.82	5.90	5.90	
37	B	Konomi Kai	Japan	x	x	5.87	5.87	
38	A	Keila Costa	Brazil	5.86	5.73	5.79	5.86	

=== Final ===
Rank	Athlete	Nationality	#1	#2	#3	#4	#5	#6	Result	Notes
1st place, gold medalist(s)	Tianna Bartoletta	United States	x	6.94	6.95	6.74	7.17	7.13	7.17	PB
2nd place, silver medalist(s)	Brittney Reese	United States	x	6.79	x	x	7.09	7.15	7.15	
3rd place, bronze medalist(s)	Ivana Španović	Serbia	6.95	x	x	6.91	7.08	7.05	7.08	NR
4	Malaika Mihambo	Germany	6.83	x	x	6.58	6.95	6.79	6.95	PB
5	Ese Brume	Nigeria	6.73	6.34	6.71	5.96	6.81	x	6.81	
6	Ksenija Balta	Estonia	6.71	x	6.79	6.71	x	6.62	6.79	SB
7	Brooke Stratton	Australia	x	6.69	6.64	6.74	6.64	6.53	6.74	
8	Jazmin Sawyers	Great Britain	6.55	6.69	6.57	6.53	x	x	6.69	
9	Darya Klishina	Russia	6.63	6.60	6.53	did not advance			6.63	
10	Sosthene Moguenara	Germany	6.61	x	6.46	did not advance			6.61	
11	Lorraine Ugen	Great Britain	6.56	x	6.58	did not advance			6.58	
–	Maryna Bekh	Ukraine	x	x	x	did not advance			NM	
