= 2018 European Athletics Championships – Women's long jump =

Women's long jump at the 2018 European Athletics Championships
- Venue: Olympic Stadium
- Location: Berlin
- Dates: 9 August (qualification); 11 August (final)
- Competitors: 27 from 18 nations
- Winning distance: 6.75

Medalists
gold medal	Malaika Mihambo	Germany
silver medal	Maryna Bekh	Ukraine
bronze medal	Shara Proctor	Great Britain

The women's long jump at the 2018 European Athletics Championships took place at the Olympic Stadium on 9 and 11 August.

== Records ==
Standing records prior to the 2016 European Athletics Championships
World record	Galina Chistyakova (URS)	7.52 m	Leningrad, Soviet Union	11 June 1988
European record	Galina Chistyakova (URS)	7.52 m	Leningrad, Soviet Union	11 June 1988
Championship record	Heike Drechsler (GDR)	7.30 m	Split, Yugoslavia	28 August 1990
World Leading	Lorraine Ugen (GBR)	7.05 m	Birmingham, Great Britain	1 July 2018
European Leading	Lorraine Ugen (GBR)	7.05 m	Birmingham, Great Britain	1 July 2018

== Schedule ==
Date	Time	Round
9 August 2018	10:30	Qualification
11 August 2018	20:05	Final

All times are local times (UTC+2)

== Results ==
=== Qualification ===
Qualification: 6.67 m (Q) or best 12 performers (q)

Rank	Group	Name	Nationality	#1	#2	#3	Result	Note
1	A	Ivana Španović	Serbia	x	6.56	6.84	6.84	Q
2	A	Shara Proctor	Great Britain	6.22	6.49	6.75	6.75	Q
3	B	Malaika Mihambo	Germany	6.71			6.71	Q
4	B	Lorraine Ugen	Great Britain	x	6.70		6.70	Q
5	A	Khaddi Sagnia	Sweden	x	6.69		6.69	Q, SB
6	B	Nastassia Mironchyk-Ivanova	Belarus	6.60	6.68		6.68	Q
7	B	Juliet Itoya	Spain	6.65	x	6.45	6.65	q
8	B	Maryna Bekh	Ukraine	6.64	x	6.63	6.64	q, =SB
9	B	Jazmin Sawyers	Great Britain	x	6.49	6.64	6.64	q
10	A	Ksenija Balta	Estonia	6.54	6.63	–	6.63	q,=SB
11	A	Nektaria Panagi	Cyprus	6.30	x	6.62	6.62	q
12	B	Evelise Veiga	Portugal	6.61	x	x	6.61	q,=NU23R
13	B	Laura Strati	Italy	x	6.60	6.29	6.60	
14	B	Angela Moroșanu	Romania	6.13	6.55	x	6.55	SB
15	A	Alina Rotaru	Romania	x	x	6.55	6.55	
15	A	Alexandra Wester	Germany	x	6.55	x	6.55	
17	B	Sosthene Moguenara	Germany	x	6.54	x	6.54	
18	A	Lauma Grīva	Latvia	6.47	6.46	x	6.47	
19	A	Krystyna Hryshutyna	Ukraine	x	6.31	x	6.31	
20	A	Milena Mitkova	Bulgaria	6.25	x	6.29	6.29	
21	B	Milica Gardašević	Serbia	6.26	6.00	x	6.26	
22	A	Fátima Diame	Spain	6.24	6.20	x	6.24	
23	A	Haido Alexouli	Greece	x	6.11	6.21	6.21	
24	B	Karin Melis Mey	Turkey	5.98	x	6.18	6.18	
25	B	Florentina Costina Iușco	Romania	x	x	6.17	6.17	
	A	Neja Filipič	Slovenia	x	x	x	NM	
	A	Éloyse Lesueur	France	x	x	–	NM	

=== Final ===
Rank	Athlete	Nationality	#1	#2	#3	#4	#5	#6	Result	Notes
1st place, gold medalist(s)	Malaika Mihambo	Germany	6.36	6.36	6.75	6.54	x	6.73	6.75	
2nd place, silver medalist(s)	Maryna Bekh	Ukraine	6.60	6.45	6.52	x	6.67	6.73	6.73	SB
3rd place, bronze medalist(s)	Shara Proctor	Great Britain	6.58	6.44	6.51	6.69	x	6.70	6.70	
4	Jazmin Sawyers	Great Britain	6.40	5.10	6.53	x	6.66	6.67	6.67	
5	Nastassia Mironchyk-Ivanova	Belarus	6.42	6.47	6.58	6.53	x	x	6.58	
6	Ksenija Balta	Estonia	6.49	x	6.38	x	6.30	x	6.49	
7	Khaddi Sagnia	Sweden	6.43	6.47	x	x	x	x	6.47	
8	Evelise Veiga	Portugal	6.47	6.39	x	6.14	6.30	x	6.47	
9	Lorraine Ugen	Great Britain	x	6.45	x				6.45	
10	Juliet Itoya	Spain	6.38	x	6.34				6.38	
11	Nektaria Panagi	Cyprus	6.10	6.10	6.29				6.29	
	Ivana Španović	Serbia							DNS	
