= Athletics at the 2012 Summer Olympics – Women's long jump =

Women's long jump at the Games of the XXX Olympiad
- Venue: Olympic Stadium
- Date: 7–8 August
- Competitors: 32 from 24 nations
- Winning distance: 7.12 m

Medalists
1st place, gold medalist(s)		Brittney Reese	United States
2nd place, silver medalist(s)		Yelena Sokolova	Russia
3rd place, bronze medalist(s)		Janay DeLoach	United States

Official video highlights

The women's long jump competition at the 2012 Summer Olympics in London, United Kingdom, was held at the Olympic Stadium on 7–8 August. The winning margin was 5 cm.

Only three barely made the auto-qualifying mark. Brittney Reese struggled with fouls and finally made a mark on her final attempt. Karin Melis Mey originally qualified for the final, but was pulled after a positive drug test.

In the final Ineta Radēviča took the first round lead with a 6.88, while Yelena Sokolova settled into second place. Brittney Reese, who has won every major championship since 2009, fouled her first attempt. In the second round, Reese hit to board cleanly, jumping 7.12. Three jumps later, Sokolova came close with a 7.07. Reese continued to struggle with three more foul jumps, her only other legal jump would have placed her eighth. Her one jump continued her string of championships. Sokolova had another attempt sufficient to get the silver, but could not challenge Reese for gold. Janay DeLoach spent the competition in fifth place until her fifth jump, when she bettered Radevica by a centimeter. Radevica had two more attempts, but couldn't improve, giving DeLoach the bronze.

== Competition format ==
The competition consisted of two rounds, qualification and final. In qualification, each athlete jumped three times (stopping early if they made the qualifying distance). At least the top twelve athletes moved on to the final; if more than twelve reached the qualifying distance, all who did so advanced. Distances were reset for the final round. Finalists jumped three times, after which the eight best jumped three more times (with the best distance of the six jumps counted).

== Schedule ==
All times are British Summer Time (UTC+1)

Date	Time	Round
Tuesday, 7 August 2012	19:05	Qualifications
Wednesday, 8 August 2012	20:05	Finals

== Records ==
Prior to the competition, the existing World and Olympic records were as follows.

World record	Galina Chistyakova (URS)	7.52 m	Leningrad, USSR	11 June 1988
Olympic record	Jackie Joyner-Kersee (USA)	7.40 m	Seoul, South Korea	29 September 1988
2012 World leading	Brittney Reese (USA)	7.15 m	Eugene, United States	1 July 2012

== Results ==
=== Qualifying round ===
Qual. rule: qualification standard 6.70m (Q) or at least best 12 qualified (q).

Rank	Group	Name	Nationality	#1	#2	#3	Result	Notes
1	A	Shara Proctor	Great Britain	6.83	-	-	6.83	Q
2	B	Janay DeLoach	United States	6.81	-	-	6.81	Q
3	A	Karin Mey Melis	Turkey	6.80	-	-	6.80	DSQ (q)
4	A	Yelena Sokolova	Russia	6.63	6.71	-	6.71	Q
5	B	Ineta Radēviča	Latvia	6.58	6.59	6.68	6.68	DSQ (q)
6	A	Nastassia Mironchyk-Ivanova	Belarus	6.55	6.62	6.66	6.66	DSQ (q)
7	B	Anna Nazarova	Russia	x	6.62	x	6.62	DSQ (q)
8	A	Lyudmila Kolchanova	Russia	6.57	x	6.54	6.57	q
9	A	Brittney Reese	United States	x	x	6.57	6.57	q
10	B	Éloyse Lesueur	France	6.48	x	6.38	6.48	q
11	A	Ivana Španović	Serbia	x	6.21	6.41	6.41	q
12	B	Veronika Shutkova	Belarus	6.01	6.21	6.40	6.40	q
13	B	Arantxa King	Bermuda	6.40	x	6.20	6.40	
14	A	Volha Sudarava	Belarus	6.38	6.35	6.13	6.38	
15	B	Maurren Higa Maggi	Brazil	6.37	x	6.27	6.37	
16	B	Chelsea Hayes	United States	6.11	6.37	6.05	6.37	
17	A	Blessing Okagbare	Nigeria	6.32	6.20	6.34	6.34	
18	A	Bianca Stuart	Bahamas	5.30	6.31	6.32	6.32	
19	B	Concepción Montaner	Spain	6.30	6.13	x	6.30	
20	B	Viktoriya Rybalko	Ukraine	x	6.21	6.29	6.29	
21	B	Sostene Moguenara	Germany	6.23	x	x	6.23	
22	A	Marestella Torres	Philippines	5.98	6.21	6.22	6.22	
23	A	Ola Sesay	Sierra Leone	6.22	5.77	5.91	6.22	
24	B	Viorica Țigău	Romania	6.21	x	x	6.21	
25	B	Irene Pusterla	Switzerland	6.20	6.14	4.88	6.20	
26	A	Marharyta Tverdohlib	Ukraine	x	6.19	6.19	6.19	DSQ
27	B	Jana Velďáková	Slovakia	6.02	6.18	x	6.18	
28	A	Lauma Grīva	Latvia	6.10	5.96	6.08	6.10	
—	A	Maiko Gogoladze	Georgia	x	x	x	NM	
—	A	Yuliya Tarasova	Uzbekistan	x	x	x	NM	
—	B	Caterine Ibargüen	Colombia	–	–	–	DNS	
—	B	Margrethe Renstrøm	Norway	–	–	–	DNS	

=== Final ===
Rank	Athlete	Nationality	1	2	3	4	5	6	Result	Notes
1st place, gold medalist(s)	Brittney Reese	United States	x	7.12	x	x	6.69	x	7.12	
2nd place, silver medalist(s)	Yelena Sokolova	Russia	6.80	7.07	6.84	6.93	6.78	6.79	7.07	PB
3rd place, bronze medalist(s)	Janay DeLoach	United States	6.77	x	6.71	6.74	6.89	x	6.89	
-	Ineta Radēviča	Latvia	6.88	6.77	6.74	x	x	6.79	6.88	DSQ
-	Anna Nazarova	Russia	x	6.77	x	6.56	6.45	6.62	6.77	DSQ
4	Lyudmila Kolchanova	Russia	x	x	6.76	6.44	x	5.97	6.76	
-	Nastassia Mironchyk-Ivanova	Belarus	6.61	6.62	6.54	6.72	x	4.55	6.72	DSQ
5	Éloyse Lesueur	France	6.57	x	x	x	6.67	x	6.67	
6	Shara Proctor	Great Britain	6.55	x	6.37	–	–	–	6.55	
7	Veronika Shutkova	Belarus	6.37	6.54	6.53	–	–	–	6.54	
8	Ivana Španović	Serbia	4.29	6.33	6.35	–	–	–	6.35	
—	Karin Mey Melis	Turkey	–	–	–	–	–	–	DNS	(Note: Karin Melis Mey was forced to withdraw after testing positive for testosterone.)
