= 2014 IAAF World Indoor Championships – Women's long jump =

The women's Long Jump at the 2014 IAAF World Indoor Championships took place on 8–9 March 2014.

== Medalists ==
Gold	Silver	Bronze
Éloyse Lesueur; France	Katarina Johnson-Thompson; Great Britain	Ivana Španović; Serbia

== Records ==
Standing records prior to the 2012 IAAF World Indoor Championships
World record	Heike Drechsler (GDR)	7.37	Vienna, Austria	13 February 1988
Championship record	Brittney Reese (USA)	7.23	Istanbul, Turkey	11 March 2012
World Leading	Svetlana Denyaeva-Biryukova (RUS)	6.98	Moscow, Russia	12 January 2014
World Leading	Svetlana Denyaeva-Biryukova (RUS)	6.98	Volgograd, Russia	25 January 2014
African record	Chioma Ajunwa (NGR)	6.97	Erfurt, Germany	5 February 1997
Asian record	Yang Juan (CHN)	6.82	Beijing, China	13 March 1992
European record	Heike Drechsler (GDR)	7.37	Vienna, Austria	13 February 1988
North and Central American and Caribbean record	Brittney Reese (USA)	7.23	Istanbul, Turkey	11 March 2012
Oceanian Record	Nicole Boegman (AUS)	6.81	Barcelona, Spain	12 March 1995
South American record	Maurren Maggi (BRA)	6.89	Valencia, Spain	9 March 1998

== Qualification standards ==
Indoor	Outdoor
6.70

== Schedule ==
Date	Time	Round
8 March 2014	12:15	Qualification
9 March 2014	15:05	Final

== Results ==
=== Qualification ===
Qualification: 6.70 (Q) or at least 8 best performers (q) qualified for the final.

Rank	Athlete	Nationality	#1	#2	#3	Result	Notes
1	Ivana Španović	Serbia	6.77			6.77	Q
2	Darya Klishina	Russia	6.76			6.76	Q, SB
3	Shara Proctor	Great Britain	6.41	6.69	–	6.69	q, SB
4	Éloyse Lesueur	France	x	6.59	6.63	6.63	q
5	Teresa Dobija	Poland	6.62	x	–	6.62	q
6	Katarina Johnson-Thompson	Great Britain	6.55	6.55	6.60	6.60	q
7	Tori Polk	United States	6.53	6.49	–	6.53	q
8	Erica Jarder	Sweden	6.35	6.40	6.50	6.50	q
9	Volha Sudarava	Belarus	6.41	6.47	6.34	6.47	
10	Sosthene Moguenara	Germany	6.44	x	x	6.44	
11	Anna Kornuta	Ukraine	6.35	6.25	x	6.35	
12	Lauma Grīva	Latvia	x	6.29	6.17	6.29	
13	Tori Bowie	United States	6.05	x	6.12	6.12	

=== Final ===
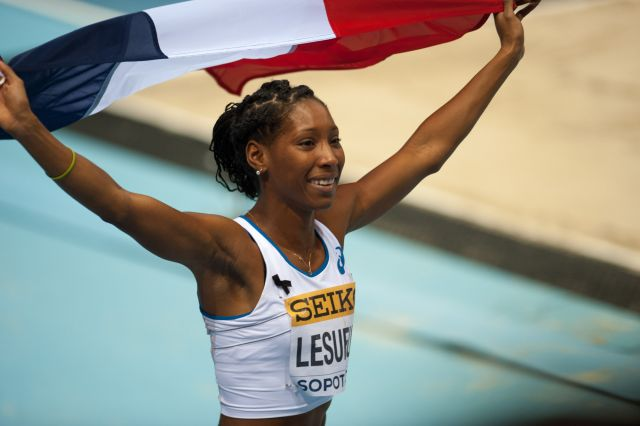
Éloyse Lesueur after winning the event.

Rank	Athlete	Nationality	#1	#2	#3	#4	#5	#6	Result	Notes
1st place, gold medalist(s)	Éloyse Lesueur	France	6.72	x	6.74	6.85	x	6.70	6.85	
2nd place, silver medalist(s)	Katarina Johnson-Thompson	Great Britain	6.69	6.81	6.69	6.54	6.68	6.62	6.81	PB
3rd place, bronze medalist(s)	Ivana Španović	Serbia	6.68	6.64	6.71	6.68	6.64	6.77	6.77	
4	Shara Proctor	Great Britain	6.68	6.65	x	6.66	x	6.46	6.68	
5	Tori Polk	United States	6.47	6.32	6.61	6.44	6.47	x	6.61	
6	Teresa Dobija	Poland	x	6.52	6.47	x	6.40	6.48	6.52	
7	Darya Klishina	Russia	6.46	x	6.38	6.10	x	6.51	6.51	
8	Erica Jarder	Sweden	6.36	x	x	6.26	6.08	x	6.36	
