= 2011 European Athletics U23 Championships – Women's triple jump =

The Women's triple jump event at the 2011 European Athletics U23 Championships was held in Ostrava, Czech Republic, at Městský stadion on 14 and 15 July.

== Medalists ==
Gold	Paraskeví Papahrístou; Greece
Silver	Carmen Toma; Romania
Bronze	Anna Jagaciak; Poland

== Results ==
=== Final ===
15 July 2011 / 15:45

Rank	Name	Nationality	Attempts						Result	Notes
Rank	Name	Nationality	1	2	3	4	5	6	Result	Notes
1st place, gold medalist(s)	Paraskeví Papahrístou	Greece	14.40 (w: +1.2 m/s)	x (w: +1.1 m/s)	x (w: +1.1 m/s)	13.98 (w: +1.2 m/s)	-	-	14.40 (w: +1.2 m/s)	
2nd place, silver medalist(s)	Carmen Toma	Romania	x (w: +1.2 m/s)	13.73 (w: +1.5 m/s)	x (w: 0.0 m/s)	13.92 (w: 0.0 m/s)	x (w: +0.5 m/s)	x (w: +0.4 m/s)	13.92 (w: 0.0 m/s)	
3rd place, bronze medalist(s)	Anna Jagaciak	Poland	13.46 (w: +1.1 m/s)	13.64 (w: +2.0 m/s)	13.67 (w: +1.0 m/s)	13.86 (w: 0.0 m/s)	13.75 (w: -0.1 m/s)	11.83 (w: +0.8 m/s)	13.86 (w: 0.0 m/s)	
4	Jenny Elbe	Germany	x (w: +0.8 m/s)	13.51 (w: +1.2 m/s)	13.73 (w: +0.7 m/s)	13.49 (w: +0.6 m/s)	13.41 (w: +1.0 m/s)	x (w: +0.9 m/s)	13.73 (w: +0.7 m/s)	
5	Hanna Knyazheva	Ukraine	13.61 (w: +1.1 m/s)	13.36 w (w: +2.1 m/s)	13.53 (w: 0.0 m/s)	x (w: +1.8 m/s)	13.36 (w: +0.5 m/s)	13.22 (w: +0.5 m/s)	13.61 (w: +1.1 m/s)	
6	Eleonora D'Elicio	Italy	13.57 (w: +1.2 m/s)	13.49 (w: +0.8 m/s)	13.24 (w: 0.0 m/s)	13.08 (w: 0.0 m/s)	x (w: +1.1 m/s)	13.17 (w: +0.6 m/s)	13.57 (w: +1.2 m/s)	PB
7	Maitane Azpeitia	Spain	13.47 (w: +0.9 m/s)	13.07 (w: +0.3 m/s)	x (w: +0.9 m/s)	x (w: 0.0 m/s)	x (w: +2.0 m/s)	12.93 (w: +0.4 m/s)	13.47 (w: +0.9 m/s)	SB
8	Svetlana Denyayeva	Russia	13.20 (w: +1.7 m/s)	13.31 (w: +1.2 m/s)	12.89 (w: 0.0 m/s)	11.90 (w: 0.0 m/s)	13.10 (w: +1.4 m/s)	x (w: 0.0 m/s)	13.31 (w: +1.2 m/s)	
9	Māra Grīva	Latvia	13.03 (w: +1.1 m/s)	13.23 (w: +1.2 m/s)	x (w: 0.0 m/s)				13.23 (w: +1.2 m/s)	
10	Martyna Bielawska	Poland	x (w: +0.1 m/s)	12.98 (w: +0.2 m/s)	13.22 (w: +0.7 m/s)				13.22 (w: +0.7 m/s)	
11	Jana Nosova	Lithuania	12.86 (w: +0.3 m/s)	12.66 (w: +0.6 m/s)	12.70 (w: 0.0 m/s)				12.86 (w: +0.3 m/s)	SB
	Kristin Gierisch	Germany							DNS	

=== Qualifications ===
Qualified: qualifying perf. 13.55 (Q) or 12 best performers (q) to the advance to the Final

==== Summary ====
Rank	Name	Nationality	Result	Notes
1	Paraskeví Papahrístou	Greece	14.28	Q
2	Carmen Toma	Romania	13.92	Q
3	Hanna Knyazheva	Ukraine	13.54	q
4	Jenny Elbe	Germany	13.54	q
5	Eleonora D'Elicio	Italy	13.41	q
6	Maitane Azpeitia	Spain	13.39	q SB
7	Martyna Bielawska	Poland	13.35	q
8	Svetlana Denyayeva	Russia	13.27	q
9	Anna Jagaciak	Poland	13.23	q
10	Kristin Gierisch	Germany	13.23	q
11	Māra Grīva	Latvia	13.05	q
12	Jana Nosova	Lithuania	13.04	q SB
13	Essi Lindgren	Finland	12.99	
14	Marquilu Nervilus	France	12.95	
15	Antoaneta Petkova	Bulgaria	12.91	
16	Inger Anne Frøysedal	Norway	12.82	
17	Mathilde Boateng	France	12.80	
18	Kristin Franke-Björkman	Sweden	12.71	
19	Iryna Vaskouskaya	Belarus	12.66	
20	Kaja Glavač	Slovenia	12.55	
21	Haykanush Beklaryan	Armenia	12.46	
22	Krisztina Hoffer	Hungary	12.38	
	Cecilia Pacchetti	Italy	NM	

==== Details ====
===== Group A =====
14 July 2011 / 18:40

Rank	Name	Nationality	Attempts			Result	Notes
Rank	Name	Nationality	1	2	3	Result	Notes
1	Paraskeví Papahrístou	Greece	14.28 (w: -0.1 m/s)			14.28 (w: -0.1 m/s)	Q
2	Carmen Toma	Romania	x (w: +0.3 m/s)	13.54 (w: -0.5 m/s)	13.92 (w: +0.1 m/s)	13.92 (w: +0.1 m/s)	Q
3	Maitane Azpeitia	Spain	13.24 (w: +0.2 m/s)	13.39 (w: -0.2 m/s)	x (w: +0.6 m/s)	13.39 (w: -0.2 m/s)	q SB
4	Martyna Bielawska	Poland	13.21 (w: -0.3 m/s)	13.27 (w: +0.4 m/s)	13.35 (w: 0.0 m/s)	13.35 (w: 0.0 m/s)	q
5	Svetlana Denyayeva	Russia	11.58 (w: -0.9 m/s)	12.40 (w: +0.3 m/s)	13.27 (w: +0.5 m/s)	13.27 (w: +0.5 m/s)	q
6	Kristin Gierisch	Germany	13.23 (w: -0.1 m/s)	x (w: -0.9 m/s)	-	13.23 (w: -0.1 m/s)	q
7	Marquilu Nervilus	France	x (w: +0.2 m/s)	12.63 (w: 0.0 m/s)	12.95 (w: -0.1 m/s)	12.95 (w: -0.1 m/s)	
8	Antoaneta Petkova	Bulgaria	12.59 (w: -1.2 m/s)	12.84 (w: +0.7 m/s)	12.91 (w: -0.1 m/s)	12.91 (w: -0.1 m/s)	
9	Inger Anne Frøysedal	Norway	12.63 (w: -0.5 m/s)	12.44 (w: +0.3 m/s)	12.82 (w: +0.6 m/s)	12.82 (w: +0.6 m/s)	
10	Iryna Vaskouskaya	Belarus	12.42 (w: -0.3 m/s)	x (w: -0.7 m/s)	12.66 (w: -0.1 m/s)	12.66 (w: -0.1 m/s)	
11	Haykanush Beklaryan	Armenia	x (w: -0.6 m/s)	12.46 (w: +0.3 m/s)	12.34 (w: +0.1 m/s)	12.46 (w: +0.3 m/s)	

===== Group B =====
14 July 2011 / 18:40

Rank	Name	Nationality	Attempts			Result	Notes
Rank	Name	Nationality	1	2	3	Result	Notes
1	Hanna Knyazheva	Ukraine	13.54 (w: +0.1 m/s)	13.37 (w: -0.3 m/s)	x (w: +0.1 m/s)	13.54 (w: +0.1 m/s)	q
2	Jenny Elbe	Germany	13.54 (w: -0.1 m/s)	-	-	13.54 (w: -0.1 m/s)	q
3	Eleonora D'Elicio	Italy	13.32 (w: -1.0 m/s)	13.18 (w: +0.2 m/s)	13.41 (w: +1.1 m/s)	13.41 (w: +1.1 m/s)	q
4	Anna Jagaciak	Poland	11.64 (w: -0.3 m/s)	13.19 (w: +0.7 m/s)	13.23 (w: +0.3 m/s)	13.23 (w: +0.3 m/s)	q
5	Māra Grīva	Latvia	13.05 (w: -0.7 m/s)	12.81 (w: +0.4 m/s)	x (w: +1.0 m/s)	13.05 (w: -0.7 m/s)	q
6	Jana Nosova	Lithuania	12.70 (w: -0.4 m/s)	13.04 (w: 0.0 m/s)	12.61 (w: 0.0 m/s)	13.04 (w: 0.0 m/s)	q SB
7	Essi Lindgren	Finland	x (w: -0.6 m/s)	x (w: +0.1 m/s)	12.99 (w: +0.5 m/s)	12.99 (w: +0.5 m/s)	
8	Mathilde Boateng	France	12.76 (w: +0.1 m/s)	12.80 (w: -0.2 m/s)	12.67 (w: +0.1 m/s)	12.80 (w: -0.2 m/s)	
9	Kristin Franke-Björkman	Sweden	x (w: +0.1 m/s)	12.71 (w: 0.0 m/s)	x (w: -0.1 m/s)	12.71 (w: 0.0 m/s)	
10	Kaja Glavač	Slovenia	12.18 (w: +0.2 m/s)	x (w: +0.8 m/s)	12.55 (w: +0.5 m/s)	12.55 (w: +0.5 m/s)	
11	Krisztina Hoffer	Hungary	12.32 (w: -1.1 m/s)	12.38 (w: 0.0 m/s)	x (w: +0.6 m/s)	12.38 (w: 0.0 m/s)	
	Cecilia Pacchetti	Italy	x (w: -0.4 m/s)	x (w: -0.1 m/s)	x (w: +0.4 m/s)	NM	

== Participation ==
According to an unofficial count, 23 athletes from 19 countries participated in the event.

- Armenia (1)
- Belarus (1)
- Bulgaria (1)
- Finland (1)
- France (2)
- Germany (2)
- Greece (1)
- Hungary (1)
- Italy (2)
- Latvia (1)
- Lithuania (1)
- Norway (1)
- Poland (2)
- Romania (1)
- Russia (1)
- Slovenia (1)
- Spain (1)
- Sweden (1)
- Ukraine (1)
