= 2011 European Athletics U23 Championships – Women's long jump =

The Women's long jump event at the 2011 European Athletics U23 Championships was held in Ostrava, Czech Republic, at Městský stadion on 16 and 17 July.

== Medalists ==
Gold	Darya Klishina; Russia
Silver	Ivana Španović; Serbia
Bronze	Sosthene Taroum Moguenara; Germany

== Results ==
=== Final ===
17 July 2011 / 15:00

Rank	Name	Nationality	Attempts						Result	Notes
Rank	Name	Nationality	1	2	3	4	5	6	Result	Notes
1st place, gold medalist(s)	Darya Klishina	Russia	7.05 (w: +1.1 m/s)	x (w: +0.3 m/s)	6.53 (w: +1.3 m/s)	x (w: +2.3 m/s)	-	6.71 (w: +1.3 m/s)	7.05 (w: +1.1 m/s)	CR
2nd place, silver medalist(s)	Ivana Španović	Serbia	6.74 w (w: +3.2 m/s)	6.51 (w: +1.1 m/s)	x (w: +3.0 m/s)	x (w: +2.7 m/s)	6.71 (w: +1.1 m/s)	x (w: +0.7 m/s)	6.74 w (w: +3.2 m/s)	SB
3rd place, bronze medalist(s)	Sosthene Taroum Moguenara	Germany	6.11 (w: +1.9 m/s)	6.74 (w: +1.8 m/s)	x (w: +2.8 m/s)	6.63 w (w: +2.1 m/s)	6.52 (w: +1.5 m/s)	6.67 (w: +0.6 m/s)	6.74 (w: +1.8 m/s)	PB
4	Anna Jagaciak	Poland	6.42 (w: +2.0 m/s)	6.31 (w: +0.4 m/s)	x (w: +0.3 m/s)	6.62 (w: +1.8 m/s)	6.29 (w: +2.0 m/s)	6.45 (w: +1.6 m/s)	6.62 (w: +1.8 m/s)	SB
5	Māra Grīva	Latvia	x (w: +1.6 m/s)	6.59 (w: +2.0 m/s)	6.38 w (w: +2.2 m/s)	6.45 (w: +1.5 m/s)	x (w: +3.0 m/s)	x (w: +2.1 m/s)	6.59 (w: +2.0 m/s)	PB
6	Nastassia Mironchyk-Ivanova	Belarus	6.51 (w: +1.4 m/s)	x (w: +2.3 m/s)	x (w: +2.4 m/s)	6.54 w (w: +2.5 m/s)	x (w: +0.6 m/s)	4.83 (w: +1.3 m/s)	6.54 w (w: +2.5 m/s)	
7	Laura Strati	Italy	6.00 (w: +1.3 m/s)	6.13 (w: +1.3 m/s)	6.36 (w: +1.6 m/s)	6.12 (w: +1.4 m/s)	6.24 (w: +1.0 m/s)	x (w: +1.4 m/s)	6.36 (w: +1.6 m/s)	PB
8	Yana Gubar	Russia	6.17 (w: +2.0 m/s)	6.27 (w: +0.8 m/s)	6.12 (w: +1.4 m/s)	6.11 (w: +1.9 m/s)	x (w: +2.0 m/s)	x (w: +1.6 m/s)	6.27 (w: +0.8 m/s)	
9	Maitane Azpeitia	Spain	6.26 (w: +0.5 m/s)	6.04 (w: +0.6 m/s)	x (w: +1.7 m/s)				6.26 (w: +0.5 m/s)	
10	Nektaria Panagi	Cyprus	6.03 (w: +0.4 m/s)	6.00 (w: +1.8 m/s)	6.12 (w: +1.6 m/s)				6.12 (w: +1.6 m/s)	
11	Oda Utsi Onstad	Norway	x (w: +2.2 m/s)	x (w: +2.1 m/s)	6.01 (w: +0.7 m/s)				6.01 (w: +0.7 m/s)	
12	Marquilu Nervilus	France	5.96 (w: +1.1 m/s)	5.96 w (w: +2.3 m/s)	5.84 (w: +2.0 m/s)				5.96 (w: +1.1 m/s)	

=== Qualifications ===
Qualified: qualifying perf. 6.45 (Q) or 12 best performers (q) to the advance to the Final

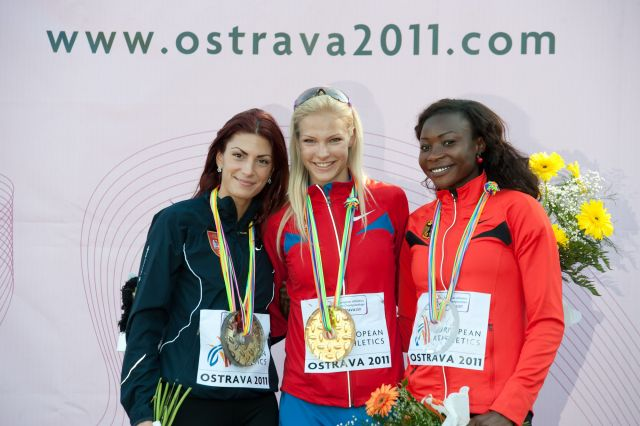
The podium (left to right): Ivana Španović, Darya Klishina, Sosthene Taroum Moguenara

==== Summary ====
Rank	Name	Nationality	Result	Notes
1	Darya Klishina	Russia	6.81	Q SB
2	Ivana Španović	Serbia	6.43	q
3	Anna Jagaciak	Poland	6.37	q
4	Māra Grīva	Latvia	6.34	q
5	Sosthene Taroum Moguenara	Germany	6.29	q
6	Maitane Azpeitia	Spain	6.28	q PB
7	Nastassia Mironchyk-Ivanova	Belarus	6.24	q
8	Laura Strati	Italy	6.24	q
9	Marquilu Nervilus	France	6.20	q PB
10	Yana Gubar	Russia	6.18	q
11	Oda Utsi Onstad	Norway	6.12	q SB
12	Nektaria Panagi	Cyprus	6.11	q
13	Daniella Sacama Isidore	France	6.07	
14	Marharyta Tverdohlib	Ukraine	6.03	
15	Svetlana Denyayeva	Russia	6.02	
16	Xenia Achkinadze	Germany	6.00	
17	Malin Olsson	Sweden	5.97	
18	Martyna Bielawska	Poland	5.96	
19	Teresa Di Loreto	Italy	5.91	
20	Hanna Knyazheva	Ukraine	5.85	
21	Milena Mitkova	Bulgaria	5.60	
	Cristina Sandu	Romania	NM	
	Lorraine Ugen	United Kingdom	NM	

==== Details ====
===== Group A =====
16 July 2011 / 10:30

Rank	Name	Nationality	Attempts			Result	Notes
Rank	Name	Nationality	1	2	3	Result	Notes
1	Darya Klishina	Russia	6.81 (w: -0.8 m/s)			6.81 (w: -0.8 m/s)	Q SB
2	Ivana Španović	Serbia	6.43 (w: -0.7 m/s)	-	-	6.43 (w: -0.7 m/s)	q
3	Anna Jagaciak	Poland	6.37 (w: -0.1 m/s)	x (w: +1.5 m/s)	6.33 (w: -0.1 m/s)	6.37 (w: -0.1 m/s)	q
4	Māra Grīva	Latvia	6.34 (w: -0.6 m/s)	x (w: 0.0 m/s)	-	6.34 (w: -0.6 m/s)	q
5	Maitane Azpeitia	Spain	x (w: -0.4 m/s)	6.11 (w: -0.1 m/s)	6.28 (w: -0.3 m/s)	6.28 (w: -0.3 m/s)	q PB
6	Laura Strati	Italy	6.09 (w: -0.4 m/s)	x (w: -0.3 m/s)	6.24 (w: +0.3 m/s)	6.24 (w: +0.3 m/s)	q
7	Marquilu Nervilus	France	x (w: -0.3 m/s)	6.06 (w: +0.1 m/s)	6.20 (w: +0.1 m/s)	6.20 (w: +0.1 m/s)	q PB
8	Oda Utsi Onstad	Norway	x (w: -0.7 m/s)	6.12 (w: +1.3 m/s)	x (w: -0.5 m/s)	6.12 (w: +1.3 m/s)	q SB
9	Marharyta Tverdohlib	Ukraine	6.03 (w: -0.4 m/s)	5.77 (w: -1.4 m/s)	x (w: -0.6 m/s)	6.03 (w: -0.4 m/s)	
10	Xenia Achkinadze	Germany	6.00 (w: -1.1 m/s)	x (w: -0.6 m/s)	5.79 (w: -0.2 m/s)	6.00 (w: -1.1 m/s)	
11	Malin Olsson	Sweden	x (w: -0.7 m/s)	5.96 (w: +0.7 m/s)	5.97 (w: -0.7 m/s)	5.97 (w: -0.7 m/s)	
	Cristina Sandu	Romania	x (w: -0.2 m/s)	x (w: -0.1 m/s)	x (w: +0.4 m/s)	NM	

===== Group B =====
16 July 2011 / 10:30

Rank	Name	Nationality	Attempts			Result	Notes
Rank	Name	Nationality	1	2	3	Result	Notes
1	Sosthene Taroum Moguenara	Germany	6.29 (w: -1.3 m/s)	4.78 (w: -1.1 m/s)	6.26 (w: 0.0 m/s)	6.29 (w: -1.3 m/s)	q
2	Nastassia Mironchyk-Ivanova	Belarus	x (w: -0.7 m/s)	6.24 (w: -0.6 m/s)	6.22 (w: -0.6 m/s)	6.24 (w: -0.6 m/s)	q
3	Yana Gubar	Russia	6.18 (w: 0.0 m/s)	6.16 (w: -0.2 m/s)	6.09 (w: -0.5 m/s)	6.18 (w: 0.0 m/s)	q
4	Nektaria Panagi	Cyprus	6.11 (w: -0.8 m/s)	5.83 (w: -0.3 m/s)	5.89 (w: -1.0 m/s)	6.11 (w: -0.8 m/s)	q
5	Daniella Sacama Isidore	France	6.07 (w: 0.0 m/s)	x (w: -1.0 m/s)	5.68 (w: -0.5 m/s)	6.07 (w: 0.0 m/s)	
6	Svetlana Denyayeva	Russia	x (w: -0.9 m/s)	5.99 (w: -0.8 m/s)	6.02 (w: -1.9 m/s)	6.02 (w: -1.9 m/s)	
7	Martyna Bielawska	Poland	5.89 (w: -0.2 m/s)	x (w: +0.2 m/s)	5.96 (w: -0.1 m/s)	5.96 (w: -0.1 m/s)	
8	Teresa Di Loreto	Italy	x (w: -0.7 m/s)	5.91 (w: 0.0 m/s)	x (w: +0.3 m/s)	5.91 (w: 0.0 m/s)	
9	Hanna Knyazheva	Ukraine	x (w: -0.5 m/s)	x (w: -0.2 m/s)	5.85 (w: -0.1 m/s)	5.85 (w: -0.1 m/s)	
10	Milena Mitkova	Bulgaria	5.60 (w: -1.3 m/s)	x (w: +0.4 m/s)	5.57 (w: -0.7 m/s)	5.60 (w: -1.3 m/s)	
	Lorraine Ugen	United Kingdom	x (w: -0.5 m/s)	x (w: +0.7 m/s)	x (w: +0.2 m/s)	NM	

== Participation ==
According to an unofficial count, 23 athletes from 16 countries participated in the event.

- Belarus (1)
- Bulgaria (1)
- Cyprus (1)
- France (2)
- Germany (2)
- Italy (2)
- Latvia (1)
- Norway (1)
- Poland (2)
- Romania (1)
- Russia (3)
- Serbia (1)
- Spain (1)
- Sweden (1)
- Ukraine (2)
- United Kingdom (1)
