= Eliane Martins =

Brazilian long jumper (born 1986)

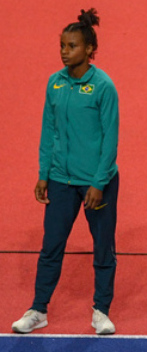
- Eliane Martins in 2022

Personal information
- Born: 26 May 1986 (age 40) Joinville, Brazil

Sport
- Country: Brazil
- Sport: Athletics
- Event: Long jump
Medal record
Women's athletics
Representing Brazil
Pan American Games
| Silver medal – second place | 2023 Santiago | Long jump |

Eliana Martins (born 26 May 1986) is a Brazilian long jumper.

She competed at the 2007 World Championships, but without reaching the final. At the 2010 World Indoor Championships she failed to record a valid jump.

She competed at the 2020 Summer Olympics.

== Personal bests ==
- Long Jump: 6.75 (wind: +1.8 m/s) – Guadalajara, Spain, 12 June 2024
- Long Jump: 6.80 (wind: +2.2 m/s) – Bragança Paulista, Brazil, 20 June 2021

All information from World Athletics profile.

== International competitions ==
| Year | Competition | Venue | Position | Event | Notes |
Representing Brazil
| 2005 | South American Junior Championships | Rosario, Argentina | 1st | Long jump | 6.41 m |
| 2007 | World Championships | Osaka, Japan | 28th (q) | Long jump | 6.28 m |
| 2008 | Ibero-American Championships | Iquique, Chile | 2nd | Long jump | 6.20 m |
| 2008 | South American U23 Championships | Lima, Peru | 1st | Long jump | 6.11 m (0.0 m/s) A |
| 2010 | World Indoor Championships | Doha, Qatar | – | Long jump | NM |
| 2010 | Ibero-American Championships | San Fernando, Spain | 1st | Long jump | 6.17 m |
| 2012 | Ibero-American Championships | Barquisimeto, Venezuela | 1st | Long jump | 6.55 m |
| 2013 | Universiade | Kazan, Russia | 17th (q) | Long jump | 5.97 m |
| 2014 | Ibero-American Championships | São Paulo, Brazil | 3rd | Long jump | 6.31 m |
| 2015 | Pan American Games | Toronto, Canada | 10th | Long jump | 6.40 m |
| 2015 | World Championships | Beijing, China | — | Long jump | NM |
| 2016 | World Indoor Championships | Portland, United States | – | Long jump | NM |
| 2016 | Ibero-American Championships | Rio de Janeiro, Brazil | 1st | Long jump | 6.52 m |
| 2016 | Olympic Games | Rio de Janeiro, Brazil | 23rd (q) | Long jump | 6.33 m |
| 2017 | South American Championships | Asunción, Paraguay | 1st | Long jump | 6.51 m (w) |
| 2017 | World Championships | London, United Kingdom | 11th | Long jump | 6.52 m |
| 2018 | South American Games | Cochabamba, Bolivia | 2nd | Long jump | 6.66 m |
| 2018 | Ibero-American Championships | Trujillo, Peru | 2nd | Long jump | 6.66 m (w) |
| 2019 | South American Championships | Lima, Peru | 1st | Long jump | 6.71 m |
| 2019 | Pan American Games | Lima, Peru | 10th | Long jump | 6.19 m |
| 2019 | World Championships | Doha, Qatar | 15th (q) | Long jump | 6.50 m |
| 2020 | South American Indoor Championships | Cochabamba, Bolivia | 3rd | Long jump | 6.44 m |
| 2021 | South American Championships | Guayaquil, Ecuador | 2nd | Long jump | 6.57 m |
| 2021 | Olympic Games | Tokyo, Japan | 18th (q) | Long jump | 6.43 m |
| 2022 | South American Indoor Championships | Cochabamba, Bolivia | 3rd | Long jump | 6.23 m |
| 2022 | World Indoor Championships | Belgrade, Serbia | – | Long jump | NM |
| 2022 | Ibero-American Championships | La Nucía, Spain | 6th | Long jump | 6.30 m |
| 2022 | World Championships | Eugene, United States | 21st (q) | Long jump | 6.33 m |
| 2023 | South American Championships | São Paulo, Brazil | 1st | Long jump | 6.62 m |
| 2023 | World Championships | Budapest, Hungary | 26th (q) | Long jump | 6.38 m |
| 2023 | Pan American Games | Santiago, Chile | 2nd | Long jump | 6.49 m |
| 2024 | South American Indoor Championships | Cochabamba, Bolivia | 2nd | Long jump | 6.49 m |
| 2024 | World Indoor Championships | Glasgow, United Kingdom | 14th | Long jump | 6.29 m |
| 2024 | Ibero-American Championships | Cuiabá, Brazil | 3rd | Long jump | 6.47 m |
| 2024 | Olympic Games | Paris, France | 23rd (q) | Long jump | 6.36 m |
| 2025 | South American Indoor Championships | Cochabamba, Bolivia | 3rd | Long jump | 6.24 m |
| 2026 | South American Indoor Championships | Cochabamba, Bolivia | 4th | Long jump | 6.28 m |
| 2026 | Pan American Championships | Medellín, Colombia | 6th | Long jump | 6.05 m |
