= Jenny Elbe =

German triple jumper (born 1990)

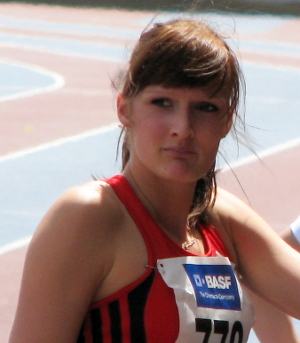
- Elbe in 2012

Personal information
- Born: 18 April 1990 (age 36) Karl-Marx-Stadt, East Germany
- Education: Dresden University of Technology
- Height: 1.80 m (5 ft 11 in)
- Weight: 64 kg (141 lb)

Sport
- Country: Germany
- Sport: Track and field
- Event: Triple jump
- Club: Dresdner SC 1898

Jenny Elbe (born 18 April 1990) is a German athlete specialising in the triple jump. She represented her country at several major international competitions making the final at the 2013 European Indoor Championships and 2014 European Championships.

Born in Karl-Marx-Stadt, East Germany, Elbe's personal bests in the event are 14.28 metres outdoors (+1.4 m/s Dresden 2016) and 14.27 metres (Belgrade 2017).

== Competition record ==
Year	Competition	Venue	Position	Event	Notes
Representing Germany
2008	World Junior Championships	Bydgoszcz, Poland	10th	Triple jump	13.01 m (wind: -0.8 m/s)
2009	European Junior Championships	Novi Sad, Serbia	3rd	Triple jump	13.55 m
2011	European U23 Championships	Ostrava, Czech Republic	4th	Triple jump	13.73 m
2011	Universiade	Shenzhen, China	8th	Triple jump	13.73 m
2012	European Championships	Helsinki, Finland	14th (q)	Triple jump	13.98 m
2013	European Indoor Championships	Gothenburg, Sweden	7th	Triple jump	13.81 m
2014	European Championships	Zürich, Switzerland	11th	Triple jump	13.68 m
2015	Universiade	Gwangju, South Korea	2nd	Triple jump	13.86 m
2016	European Championships	Amsterdam, Netherlands	7th	Triple jump	14.08 m
2016	Olympic Games	Rio de Janeiro, Brazil	13th (q)	Triple jump	14.02 m
2017	European Indoor Championships	Belgrade, Serbia	6th	Triple jump	14.12 m
