= Carmen Toma =

Romanian triple jumper

Personal information
- Born: 28 March 1989 (age 36)
- Education: Ovidius University
- Height: 1.66 m (5 ft 5 in)
- Weight: 50 kg (110 lb)

Sport
- Sport: Track and field
- Event: Triple jump

Carmen Cristina Toma (born 28 March 1989) is a Romanian athlete specialising in the triple jump. She won the bronze medal at the 2013 Summer Universiade.

She has personal bests of 14.29 metres outdoors (2009) and 13.89 metres indoors (2009).

== Competition record ==
| Year | Competition | Venue | Position | Notes |
Representing Romania
| 2005 | World Youth Championships | Marrakesh, Morocco | 8th | 12.76 m |
| 2006 | World Junior Championships | Beijing, China | 11th | 12.79 m |
| 2007 | European Junior Championships | Hengelo, Netherlands | 7th | 13.06 m (w) |
| 2008 | World Junior Championships | Bydgoszcz, Poland | 5th | 13.40 m |
| 2009 | European Indoor Championships | Turin, Italy | 12th (q) | 13.88 m |
| 2009 | European U23 Championships | Kaunas, Lithuania | – | NM |
| 2010 | European Championships | Barcelona, Spain | 14th (q) | 14.03 m |
| 2011 | European Indoor Championships | Paris, France | 17th (q) | 13.66 m |
| 2011 | European U23 Championships | Ostrava, Czech Republic | 2nd | 13.92 m (wind: 0.0 m/s) |
| 2011 | Universiade | Shenzhen, China | 7th | 13.82 m |
| 2013 | Universiade | Kazan, Russia | 3rd | 14.14 m |
| 2013 | Jeux de la Francophonie | Nice, France | 2nd | 13.92 m |
| 2015 | Universiade | Gwangju, South Korea | 17th (q) | 12.91 m |
| 2016 | World Indoor Championships | Portland, United States | 12th | 13.31 m |
| 2017 | DécaNation | Angers, France | 2nd | 13.48 m |
