= Brooke Buschkuehl =

Australian athletics competitor

Personal information
- Full name: Brooke Marie Buschkuehl
- Born: Brooke Marie Stratton; 12 July 1993 (age 33) Box Hill, Victoria, Australia
- Education: Caulfield Grammar School, Deakin University
- Height: 1.66 m (5 ft 5 in)
- Weight: 58 kg (128 lb)

Sport
- Country: Australia
- Sport: Track and field
- Event: Long jump
- Coached by: Self coached
Medal record
Commonwealth Games
Silver medal – second place	2018 Gold Coast	Long jump
Silver medal – second place	2022 Birmingham	Long jump
- Updated on 26 January 2023

Brooke Marie Buschkuehl (née Stratton; born 12 July 1993) is an Australian long jumper. She is the current Australian & Oceania Record Holder with a personal best distance of 7.13m. She is a 3x Olympian and has represented Australia in the 2016, 2020 & 2024 Olympic Games. At the 2020 Olympics in Tokyo, Stratton jumped a distance of 6.83m placing 7th in the Women's Long Jump final. Brooke is a 2x Commonwealth Games Silver Medallist (Gold Coast & Birmingham) and multiple World Championship finalist. In 2022 Brooke placed 5th at the Eugene World Championships missing the Bronze Medal by 2 cm.

== Early years ==
Stratton started her career at the Nunawading Little Athletics center at the age of 5, following in the footsteps of her brother, Jamie. Four years later she won the under-9 state title and her success in the long jump continued with the World Youth Championships in 2009 where she placed 10th. She then competed at the world juniors in 2010 and 2012. She also competed in athletics at school level for Caulfield Grammar School.

In 2013 Stratton was diagnosed with coeliac disease. She had been struggling with fatigue & associated symptoms of undiagnosed Coeliac Disease for most of the previous two years. She changed her diet and performance improved. She was selected in the 2014 Commonwealth Games but was forced to withdraw with an injury.

== Achievements ==
Stratton competed at the 2015 World Championships in Beijing leaping 6.64m in the qualifying round but narrowly missed the final. In the 2016 Summer Olympics she finished seventh.

As a 23 year old, she jumped a personal best of 7.05m at the Perth Track Classic on 12 March 2016, breaking the 14-year-old Australian record held by Bronwyn Thompson.

She was selected for the Australian Athletics team (in long jump) at the 2018 Commonwealth Games on the Gold Coast, Queensland and was placed 2nd with a leap of 6.77m.

== Personal life ==
Stratton studied a Bachelor of Health Sciences at Deakin University, which she completed in February 2020. She is the sister of Hawthorn AFLW player Kristy Stratton. Both of them attended Caulfield Grammar School in Wheelers Hill, Victoria and were active athletes, with Brooke holding many records and Kristy holding the record for 80 metres hurdles in the under-14 category.

== Competition record ==
Year	Competition	Venue	Position	Event	Notes
Representing Australia
2009	World Youth Championships	Brixen, Italy	10th	Long jump	5.86 m
2010	Oceania Youth Championships	Sydney, Australia	2nd	Triple jump	12.60 m
2010	World Junior Championships	Moncton, Canada	6th	Long jump	6.05 m
2012	World Junior Championships	Barcelona, Spain	7th	Long jump	6.42 m
2015	World Championships	Beijing, China	14th (q)	Long jump	6.64 m
2016	World Indoor Championships	Portland, United States	5th	Long jump	6.75 m
2016	Olympic Games	Rio de Janeiro, Brazil	7th	Long jump	6.74 m
2017	World Championships	London, United Kingdom	6th	Long jump	6.67 m
2018	Commonwealth Games	Gold Coast, Australia	2nd	Long jump	6.77 m
2019	World Championships	Doha, Qatar	10th	Long jump	6.46 m
2021	Olympic Games	Tokyo, Japan	7th	Long jump	6.83 m
2022	World Championships	Eugene, United States	5th	Long jump	6.87 m
2022	Commonwealth Games	Birmingham, England	2nd	Long jump	6.95 m
2023	World Championships	Budapest, Hungary	17th (q)	Long jump	6.55 m
2024	Olympic Games	Paris, France	25th (q)	Long jump	6.31 m
2026	Commonwealth Games	Glasgow, United Kingdom	3rd	Long jump	6.80 m

== See also ==
- List of Caulfield Grammar School people
