= Naa Anang =

Australian long jumper

Personal information
- Born: 10 March 1995 (age 31) Accra, Ghana
- Education: Australian Catholic University
- Height: 1.65 m (5 ft 5 in)
- Weight: 57 kg (126 lb)

Sport
- Sport: Athletics
- Event: Long jump
- Coached by: Gary Bourne
Medal record
Women's athletics
Representing AUS
Commonwealth Games
Bronze medal – third place	2022 Birmingham	4×100m relay

Naa Anang (born 10 March 1995) is an Australian athlete specialising in the long jump. She represented her country at the 2017 World Championships without reaching the final. In addition, she won a bronze medal at the 2015 Summer Universiade.

Her personal best in the event is 6.81 metres set in Sydney in 2019.

Naa Anang was part of the Australian 4 x 100m sprint relay team that finished third at the 2022 Commonwealth Games.

== International competitions ==
Year	Competition	Venue	Position	Event	Notes
Representing Australia
2011	Commonwealth Youth Games	Douglas, Isle of Man	2nd	Long jump	5.94 m (w)
2014	World Junior Championships	Eugene, United States	17th (q)	Long jump	5.97 m
2015	Universiade	Gwangju, South Korea	3rd	Long jump	6.55 m
2017	World Championships	London, United Kingdom	22nd (q)	Long jump	6.27 m
2018	Commonwealth Games	Gold Coast, Queensland	9th	Long jump	6.22 m
2019	World Relays	Yokohama, Japan	6th	4 × 100 m relay	44.62
2022	Commonwealth Games	Birmingham, England	3rd	4 × 100 m relay	43.16

== Personal bests ==
Event	PB	Wind	Venue	Date
100 m	11.20s	+ 1.3	Melbourne, Australia	23 February 2023
Long Jump	6.81m	+1.5	Sydney, Australia	7 April 2019
