= Athletics at the 2015 Summer Universiade – Women's triple jump =

The women's triple jump event at the 2015 Summer Universiade was held on 10 and 11 July at the Gwangju Universiade Main Stadium.

== Medalists ==
Gold	Silver	Bronze
Yekaterina Koneva; Russia	Jenny Elbe; Germany	Anna Jagaciak-Michalska; Poland

== Results ==
=== Qualification ===
Qualification: 13.90 m (Q) or at least 12 best (q) qualified for the final.

Rank	Group	Athlete	Nationality	#1	#2	#3	Result	Notes
1	A	Yekaterina Koneva	Russia	14.29			14.29	Q
2	A	Jenny Elbe	Germany	13.58	13.90		13.90	Q
3	A	Anna Jagaciak-Michalska	Poland	13.77	x	13.89	13.89	q
4	B	Wang Wupin	China	13.58	13.81	x	13.81	q
5	A	Nneka Okpala	New Zealand	13.04	13.36	x	13.36	q
6	A	Irina Ektova	Kazakhstan	13.25	13.30	x	13.30	q
7	B	Anna Kornuta	Ukraine	12.87	13.00	13.30	13.30	q
8	A	Essi Lindgren	Finland	13.29	x	x	13.29	q
9	B	Eleonora D'Elicio	Italy	13.05	13.00	13.24	13.24	q, SB
10	B	Bae Chan-mi	South Korea	13.21	x	12.50	13.21	q
11	A	Madara Apine	Latvia	x	x	13.21	13.21	q
11	B	Olesya Tikhonova	Russia	x	13.21	x	13.21	q
13	A	Saša Babšek	Slovenia	x	x	13.15	13.15	
14	B	Sanna Nygaard	Finland	13.13	x	x	13.13	
15	B	Giselly Landazuri	Colombia	13.09	12.77	13.05	13.09	
16	A	Ivonne Rangel	Mexico	13.06	x	x	13.06	SB
17	B	Carmen Toma	Romania	12.91	x	x	12.91	
18	A	Sun Yan	China	12.47	12.84	x	12.84	
19	B	Sibongile Ntshingila	South Africa	12.26	x	12.82	12.82	
20	A	Zinzi Chabangu	South Africa	12.20	12.54	12.78	12.78	
21	A	Bhumika Thakur	India	12.41	x	12.53	12.53	
22	A	Jasmin Tairlbahre	Sweden	12.30	12.20	12.46	12.46	
	B	Vindya Rillagodage	Sri Lanka	x	x	x	NM	
	B	Ariana Gutiérrez	Venezuela				DNS	

=== Final ===
Official Video

Rank	Athlete	Nationality	#1	#2	#3	#4	#5	#6	Result	Notes
1st place, gold medalist(s)	Yekaterina Koneva	Russia	14.17	14.41	14.28	14.60	–	–	14.60	
2nd place, silver medalist(s)	Jenny Elbe	Germany	13.49	13.85	13.59	13.86	13.72	13.34	13.86	
3rd place, bronze medalist(s)	Anna Jagaciak-Michalska	Poland	13.48	13.65	13.65	x	13.76	13.81	13.81	
4	Wang Wupin	China	13.28	13.64	13.70	13.15	13.56	13.75	13.75	
5	Madara Apine	Latvia	13.12	13.18	12.76	13.29	13.56	12.94	13.56	
6	Irina Ektova	Kazakhstan	x	13.40	x	x	x	13.45	13.45	
7	Anna Kornuta	Ukraine	12.95	x	13.27	13.20	12.98	x	13.27	
8	Nneka Okpala	New Zealand	x	12.82	13.09	13.13	13.08	13.15	13.15	
9	Olesya Tikhonova	Russia	x	x	13.09				13.09	
10	Essi Lindgren	Finland	12.94	12.71	12.91				12.94	
11	Eleonora D'Elicio	Italy	x	x	12.87				12.87	
12	Bae Chan-mi	South Korea	x	12.65	12.57				12.65	
