= Velďáková =

Velďáková is a Slovak surname, a feminine form of surname Velďák. Notable people with the surname include:

- Dana Velďáková (born 1981), Slovak triple jumper
- Jana Velďáková (born 1981), Slovak long jumper, twin sister of Dana
