= María del Mar Jover =

Spanish long jumper

Personal information
- Born: 21 April 1988 (age 38) Alicante, Spain
- Height: 1.61 m (5 ft 3 in)
- Weight: 51 kg (112 lb)

Sport
- Sport: Track and field
- Event: Long jump
- Club: Valencia Terra i Mar
- Updated on 29 August 2015

María del Mar Jover Pérez (born 21 April 1988) is a Spanish long jumper. She competed at the 2015 World Championships in Beijing without recording a legal jump.

Her personal bests in the event are 6.78 metres outdoors (+0.2 m/s, Monachil 2014) and 6.43 metres indoors (Monachil 2014).

== Competition record ==
Year	Competition	Venue	Position	Event	Notes
Representing Spain
2003	World Youth Championships	Sherbrooke, Canada	10th	Long jump	5.65 m
2005	European Youth Olympic Festival	Lignano Sabbiadoro, Italy	–	100 m H (76.2 cm)	DNF
2005	European Youth Olympic Festival	Lignano Sabbiadoro, Italy	4th	Long jump	6.15 m
2005	World Youth Championships	Marrakesh, Morocco	17th (h)	100 m H (76.2 cm)	14.09 s
2005	World Youth Championships	Marrakesh, Morocco	17th (q)	Long jump	5.94 m
2009	European U23 Championships	Kaunas, Lithuania	15th (q)	Long jump	6.18 m
2011	Universiade	Shenzhen, China	18th (q)	Long jump	6.01 m
2012	European Championships	Helsinki, Finland	18th (q)	Long jump	6.27 m
2013	Universiade	Kazan, Russia	6th	Long jump	6.32 m
2014	European Championships	Zurich, Switzerland	14th (q)	Long jump	6.36 m
2015	World Championships	Beijing, China	–	Long jump	NM
2016	European Championships	Amsterdam, Netherlands	13th (q)	Long jump	6.43 m
2016	Olympic Games	Rio de Janeiro, Brazil	36th (q)	Long jump	5.90 m
