= Krystyna Hryshutyna =

Ukrainian long jumper (born 1992)

Personal information
- Born: 21 March 1992 (age 34)

Sport
- Country: Ukraine
- Sport: Track and field
- Event: Long jump
- Updated on 29 August 2015

Krystyna Hryshutyna (born 21 March 1992) is a long jumper from Ukraine. She competed at the 2015 World Championships in Beijing without qualifying for the final.

Her personal bests in the event are 6.81 metres outdoors (+1.1 m/s, Kirovohrad 2015) and 6.41 metres indoors (Kiev 2015).

== Competition record ==
Year	Competition	Venue	Position	Event	Notes
Representing Ukraine
2009	World Youth Championships	Brixen, Italy	7th	Long jump	5.99 m
2009	European Youth Olympic Festival	Tampere, Finland	13th (q)	Long jump	5.67 m
2011	European Junior Championships	Tallinn, Estonia	4th	Long jump	6.10 m
2012	European Championships	Helsinki, Finland	26th (q)	Long jump	6.08 m
2013	European U23 Championships	Tampere, Finland	2nd	Long jump	6.61 m
2015	World Championships	Beijing, China	18th (q)	Long jump	6.53 m
2018	European Championships	Berlin, Germany	19th (q)	Long jump	6.31 m
