= Nektaria Panagi =

Cypriot long jumper (born 1990)

Personal information
- Nationality: Cypriot
- Born: 20 March 1990 (age 36) Larnaca, Cyprus
- Height: 1.69 m (5 ft 7 in)
- Weight: 50 kg (110 lb) (2014)

Sport
- Country: Cyprus
- Sport: Athletics
- Event: Long jump

Achievements and titles
- Personal best(s): Long jump: 6.72m, 6.77m/w (2018)
Medal record
Summer Universiade
Silver medal – second place	2017 Taipei	Long jump
Mediterranean Games
Gold medal – first place	2013 Mersin	Long jump
Games of the Small States of Europe
Gold medal – first place	2007 Monaco	Long jump
Gold medal – first place	2009 Nicosia	Long jump
Gold medal – first place	2011 Liechtenstein	Long jump
Gold medal – first place	2013 Luxembourg	Long jump

Nektaria Panagi (Greek: Νεκταρία Παναγή) (born 20 March 1990 in Larnaca) is a Cypriot long jumper. Her personal best is 6.72m, achieved in Argos Orestiko, Greece on July 7, 2018. She is known for winning the gold medal at the 2013 Mediterranean Games, the silver medal at the 2017 Summer Universiade, the qualification at the 2018 European Championships final, as well as the participation at the 2017 World Championships and 2019 World Championships .

== Achievements ==
Year	Competition	Venue	Position	Event	Notes
Representing Cyprus
2007	Games of the Small States of Europe	Monaco	1st	Long jump	5.81 m
2009	Games of the Small States of Europe	Nicosia, Cyprus	1st	Long jump	6.05 m
2009	Mediterranean Games	Pescara, Italy	5th	Long jump	5.93 m
2009	European Junior Championships	Novi Sad, Serbia	20th (q)	Long jump	5.88 m
2011	Games of the Small States of Europe	Schaan, Liechtenstein	1st	Long jump	6.35 m
2011	European U23 Championships	Ostrava, Czech Republic	10th	Long jump	6.12 m
2012	European Championships	Helsinki, Finland	16th (q)	Long jump	6.31 m
2013	Games of the Small States of Europe	Luxembourg, Luxembourg	1st	Long jump	6.07 m
2013	Mediterranean Games	Mersin, Turkey	1st	Long jump	6.51 m
2014	Commonwealth Games	Glasgow, United Kingdom	7th	Long jump	6.33 m
2014	European Championships	Zürich, Switzerland	24th (q)	Long jump	6.12 m
2015	Universiade	Gwangju, South Korea	4th	Long jump	6.52 m
2016	European Championships	Amsterdam, Netherlands	17th (q)	Long jump	6.33 m
2017	World Championships	London, United Kingdom	15th (q)	Long jump	6.43 m
2017	Universiade	Taipei, Taiwan	2nd	Long jump	6.42 m
2018	Commonwealth Games	Gold Coast, Australia	6th	Long jump	6.44 m
2018	Mediterranean Games	Tarragona, Spain	4th	Long jump	6.61 m
2018	European Championships	Berlin, Germany	11th	Long jump	6.29 m
2019	World Championships	Doha, Qatar	30th (q)	Long jump	6.21 m
