= Lauma Grīva =

Latvian long jumper

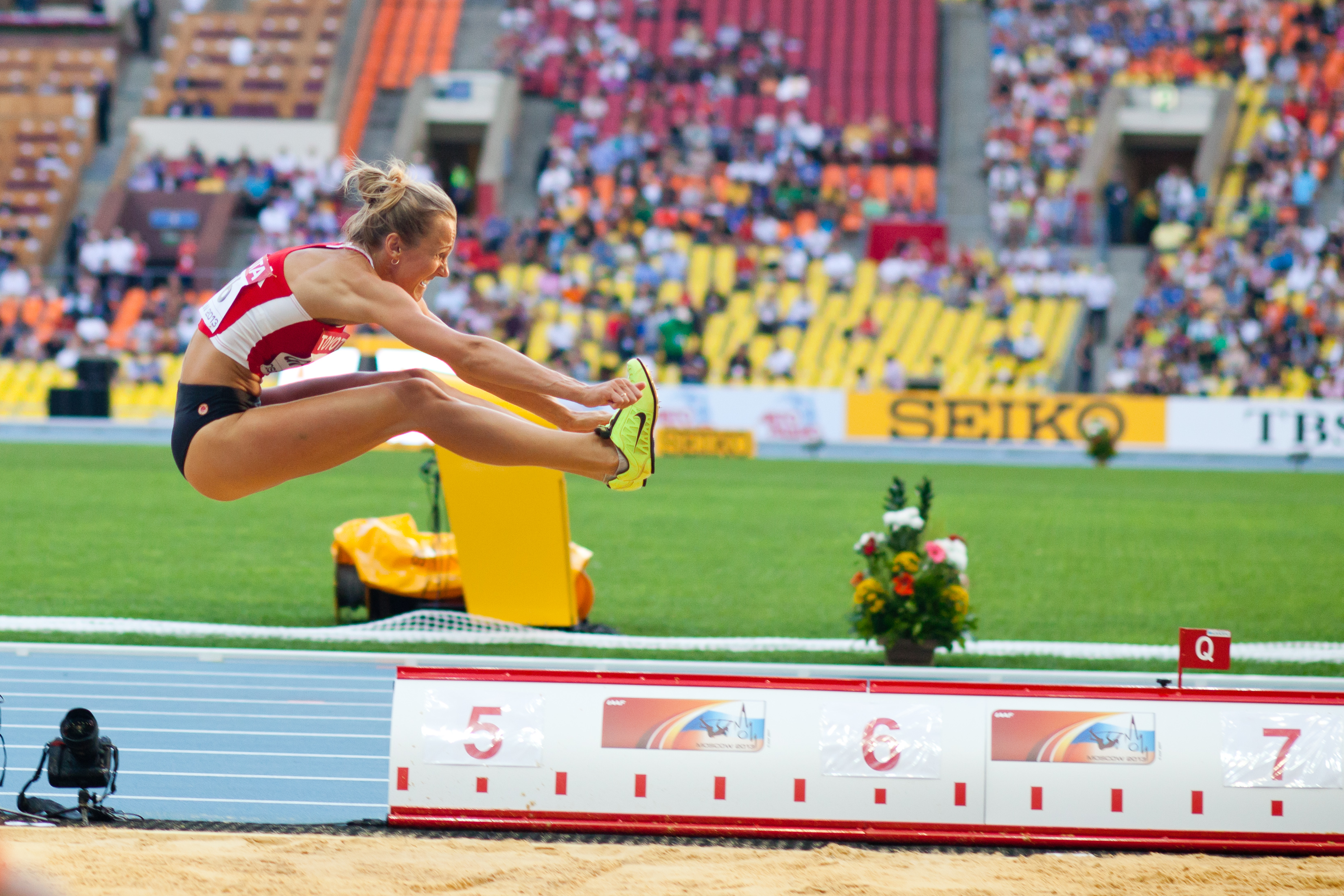
- Lauma Grīva during 2013 World Championships in Athletics in Moscow.

Personal information
- Nationality: Latvian
- Born: 27 October 1984 (age 41) Ventspils, Latvian Socialist Soviet Republic, Soviet Union (now Republic of Latvia)
- Height: 1.81 m (5 ft 11 in)
- Weight: 63 kg (139 lb)

Sport
- Country: Latvia
- Sport: Track and field
- Event: Long jump

Achievements and titles
- Personal best: Long jump: 6.86 m (2011)

Lauma Grīva (born 27 October 1984) is a Latvian athlete who competed in the long jump.

At the 2010 European Championships she achieved a new personal best of 6.60 metres, but was two centimetres short of qualifying for the final. She finished 15th.

Lauma is also the 2009 Latvian champion in long jump.

Her sister Māra Grīva is also a long jumper.

Lauma attended the Ventspils Gymnasium No.1 and the Latvian Academy of Sport Education.

== Achievements ==
Year	Competition	Venue	Position	Notes
2009	Universiade	Belgrade, Serbia	15th (q)	6.04 m
2010	European Championships	Barcelona, Spain	15th (q)	6.60 m
2011	Universiade	Shenzhen, China	10th	6.22 m
2011	World Championships	Daegu, South Korea	23rd (q)	6.27 m
2012	World Indoor Championships	Istanbul, Turkey	–	NM
2012	European Championships	Helsinki, Finland	12th (q)	6.37 m
2012	Olympic Games	London, United Kingdom	28th (q)	6.10 m
2013	European Indoor Championships	Gothenburg, Sweden	13th (q)	6.34 m
2013	World Championships	Moscow, Russia	16th (q)	6.50 m
2014	World Indoor Championships	Sopot, Poland	12th (q)	6.29 m
2014	European Championships	Zürich, Switzerland	23rd (q)	6.14 m
2017	World Championships	London, United Kingdom	9th	6.54 m
2018	World Indoor Championships	Birmingham, United Kingdom	11th	6.34 m
2018	European Championships	Berlin, Germany	18th (q)	6.47 m
2019	European Indoor Championships	Glasgow, United Kingdom	15th (q)	6.34 m
