= Athletics at the 2013 Summer Universiade – Women's long jump =

The women's long jump event at the 2013 Summer Universiade was held on 7–8 July 2013.

== Medalists ==
Gold	Silver	Bronze
Darya Klishina; Russia	Yelena Sokolova; Russia	Michelle Weitzel; Germany

== Results ==
=== Qualification ===
Qualification: 6.25 m (Q) or at least 12 best (q) qualified for the final.

Rank	Group	Athlete	Nationality	#1	#2	#3	Result	Notes
1	A	Yelena Sokolova	Russia	6.70			6.70	Q
2	B	Daria Klishina	Russia	6.48			6.48	Q
3	A	Cornelia Deiac	Romania	6.13	x	6.42	6.42	Q
4	A	Ksenia Achkinadze	Germany	6.19	6.41		6.41	Q
5	B	María del Mar Jover	Spain	6.39			6.39	Q
6	A	Anna Jagaciak	Poland	4.94	6.39		6.39	Q
7	B	Michelle Weitzel	Germany	6.20	6.31		6.31	Q
8	A	Jessica Penney	Australia	4.88	6.20	6.30	6.30	Q
9	A	Māra Grīva	Latvia	6.28			6.28	Q
10	B	Yuliya Tarasova	Uzbekistan	6.27			6.27	Q
11	B	Cristina Sandu	Romania	x	6.20	6.27	6.27	Q
12	B	Vashti Thomas	United States	6.02	6.26		6.26	Q
13	B	Maria Londa	Indonesia	x	6.25		6.25	Q
14	B	Christabel Nettey	Canada	6.20	6.08	6.22	6.22	
15	A	Sabrina Nettey	Canada	x	6.14	6.15	6.15	
16	A	Lina Andrijauskaite	Lithuania	6.02	5.99	x	6.02	
17	A	Eliane Martins	Brazil	5.97	x	5.88	5.97	
18	B	Sevim Sinmez Serbest	Turkey	5.90	x	x	5.90	
19	A	Hsieh Ching-ju	Chinese Taipei	5.81	5.83	5.72	5.83	
20	B	No Kaushlya Devi	India	5.83	5.76	5.65	5.83	
21	A	Laura Maasik	Estonia	3.38	5.44	5.58	5.58	
22	B	Rebecca Sare	Malta	5.57	5.56	5.38	5.57	
23	B	Doussou Diakite	Mali	5.01	5.19	5.09	5.19	
24	B	Triin Eerme	Estonia	5.19	5.08	x	5.19	
25	A	Cindy Vega	Colombia	x	5.12	4.87	5.12	
26	B	Irma Betancourth	Colombia	x	4.58	-	4.58	
27	A	Rosemary Kaputula	Zambia	4.29	4.08	4.44	4.44	
	A	Corlia Kruger	Namibia				DNS	
	A	Marcelle Bouele Bondo	Congo				DNS	
	A	Aissa Issa Seyni	Niger				DNS	
	B	Marina Mpiana Konde	DR Congo				DNS	
	B	Susan Kamara	Sierra Leone				DNS	

=== Final ===
Official Video

Rank	Athlete	Nationality	#1	#2	#3	#4	#5	#6	Result	Notes
1st place, gold medalist(s)	Daria Klishina	Russia	6.72	x	6.77	6.90	6.61	6.78	6.90	SB
2nd place, silver medalist(s)	Yelena Sokolova	Russia	6.67	6.55	6.73	6.60	x	6.67	6.73	
3rd place, bronze medalist(s)	Michelle Weitzel	Germany	6.16	x	6.38	6.56	6.50	6.35	6.56	
4	Cornelia Deiac	Romania	6.24	6.27	6.29	6.12	6.38	6.19	6.38	
5	Ksenia Achkinadze	Germany	6.22	6.34	6.02	6.20	6.25	6.09	6.34	
6	María del Mar Jover	Spain	6.24	6.29	6.32	x	x	6.10	6.32	
7	Anna Jagaciak	Poland	x	6.25	4.99	6.32	5.12	5.99	6.32	
8	Māra Grīva	Latvia	6.16	6.17	6.29	x	6.14	6.27	6.29	
9	Jessica Penney	Australia	6.25	4.79	x				6.25	
10	Cristina Sandu	Romania	6.16	6.20	6.20				6.20	
11	Maria Londa	Indonesia	6.19	x	6.19				6.19	
12	Yuliya Tarasova	Uzbekistan	6.04	x	6.03				6.04	
13	Vashti Thomas	United States	x	6.01	5.68				6.01	
