= Māra Grīva =

Latvian track and field athlete

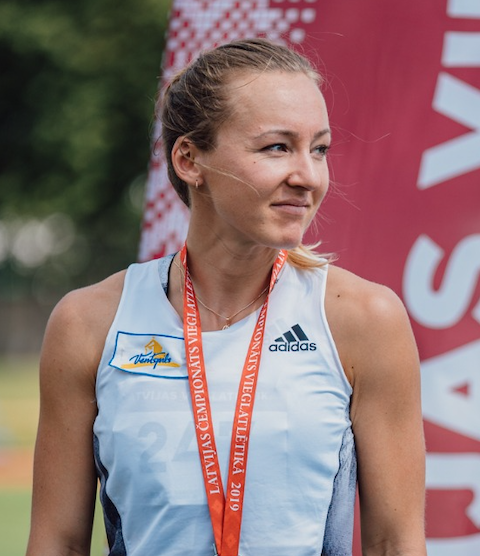

Personal information
- Nationality: Latvian
- Born: 4 August 1989 (age 36) Ventspils, Latvian SSR, Soviet Union (now Republic of Latvia)
- Education: University of Nebraska–Lincoln
- Height: 1.70 m (5 ft 7 in)
- Weight: 60 kg (132 lb)
- Parents: Baiba Griva, Maris Griva

Sport
- Sport: Athletics
- Events: Long jump, triple jump
- Coached by: Māris Grīva

Achievements and titles
- Personal bests: 6.59m in long jump, 13.81m in triple jump, 41.60m in javelin throw
Medal record
Universiade
Bronze medal – third place	Taipei 2017	Triple jump

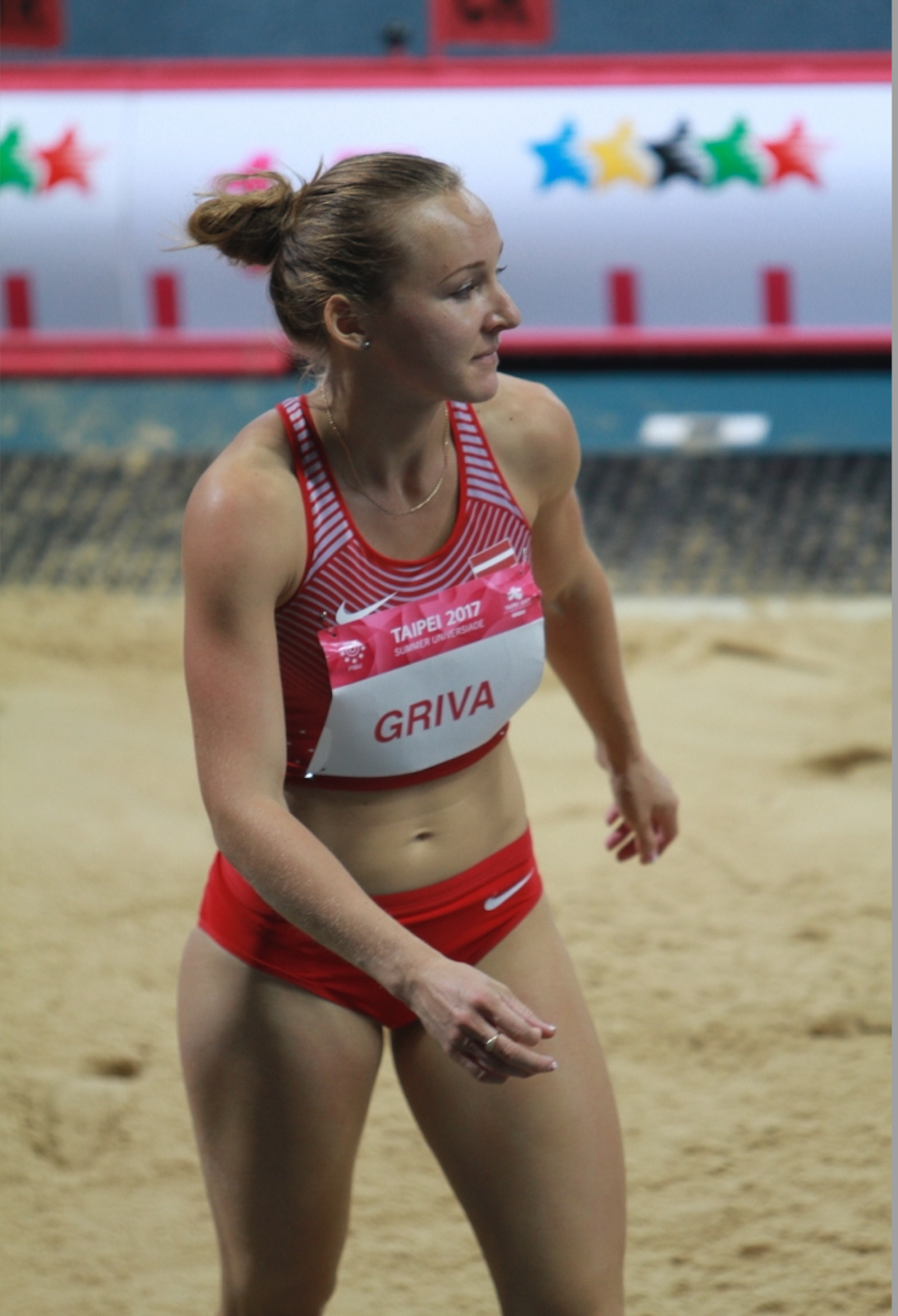

Māra Grīva (born 4 August 1989 in Ventspils) is a Latvian track and field athlete competing in the long and triple jump. She won a bronze medal in the triple jump at the 2017 Summer Universiade.

Her coach is her father Māris Grīva - a well-known Latvian coach, whose athlete Dainis Kūla won the Olympic gold medal at the 1980 Moscow Olympic Games. Her sisters Lauma Grīva, Gundega Grīva and brother Janis Svens Grīva are also athletes.

== International competitions ==
Year	Competition	Venue	Position	Event	Notes
Representing Latvia
2009	Universiade	Belgrade, Serbia	14th (q)	Triple jump	12.43 m
2009	European U23 Championships	Kaunas, Lithuania	17th (q)	Long jump	6.14 m
2011	European U23 Championships	Ostrava, Czech Republic	5th	Long jump	6.59 m
2011	European U23 Championships	Ostrava, Czech Republic	9th	Triple jump	13.23 m
2011	Universiade	Shenzhen, China	12th	Long jump	6.17 m
2011	Universiade	Shenzhen, China	22nd (q)	Triple jump	12.49 m
2012	European Championships	Helsinki, Finland	27th (q)	Long jump	6.00 m
2013	Universiade	Kazan, Russia	8th	Long jump	6.29 m
2013	Universiade	Kazan, Russia	12th	Triple jump	12.77 m
2017	Universiade	Taipei, Taiwan	8th	Long jump	6.16 m
2017	Universiade	Taipei, Taiwan	3rd	Triple jump	13.58 m
2019	European Indoor Championships	Glasgow, United Kingdom	10th (q)	Long jump	6.41 m

== Personal bests ==
Outdoor

- Long jump – 6.59 ( Ostrava 2011)
- Triple jump – 13.81 (Norman 2011)

Indoor

- Triple jump – 13.26 (Lincoln 2014)
- Long jump – 6.41 (Nehvizdy 2019)
