= Anna Kornuta =

Ukrainian long jumper (born 1988)

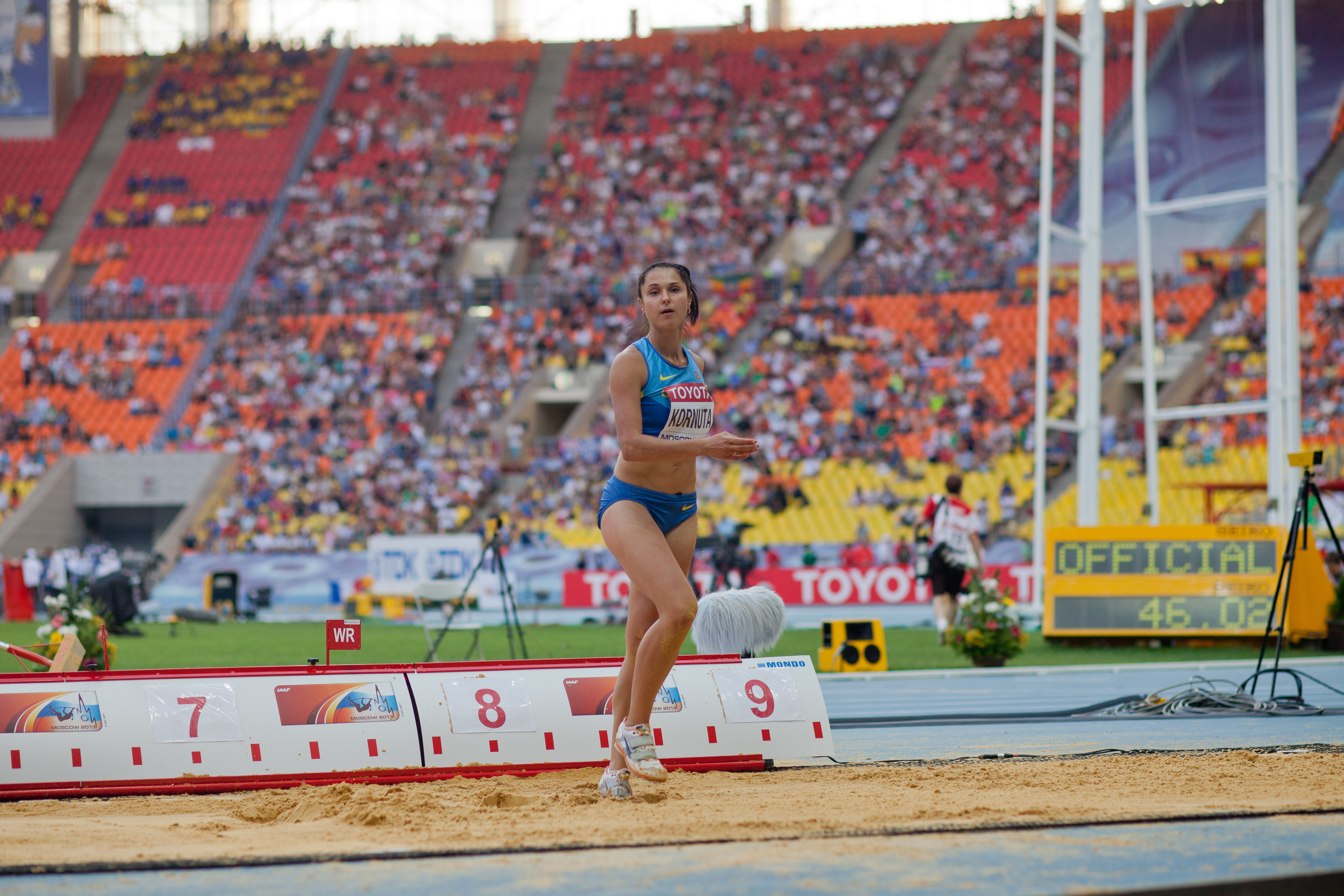
- Kornuta at the 2013 World Championships in Athletics

Personal information
- Full name: Anna Mykolayivna Kornuta
- Born: 10 November 1988 (age 37)
- Education: Kharkiv State Academy of Physical Culture
- Height: 1.70 m (5 ft 7 in)
- Weight: 55 kg (121 lb)

Sport
- Sport: Athletics
- Events: Long jump, triple jump

Anna Mykolayivna Kornuta (Ukrainian: Анна Миколаївна Корнута; born 10 November 1988) is a Ukrainian athlete specialising in the long jump. She represented her country at the 2013 World Championships without qualifying for the final.

== International competitions ==
Year	Competition	Venue	Position	Event	Notes
Representing Ukraine
2013	World Championships	Moscow, Russia	15th (q)	Long jump	6.53 m
2014	World Indoor Championships	Sopot, Poland	11th (q)	Long jump	6.35 m
2015	Universiade	Gwangju, South Korea	16th (q)	Long jump	5.98 m
2015	Universiade	Gwangju, South Korea	7th	Triple jump	13.27 m
2016	European Championships	Amsterdam, Netherlands	11th	Long jump	6.42 m
2016	Olympic Games	Rio de Janeiro, Brazil	19th (q)	Long jump	6.37 m

== Personal bests ==
Outdoor

- Long jump – 6.72 (+2.0 m/s, Kiev 2013)
- Triple jump – 13.70 (+1.9 m/s, Yalta 2011)

Indoor

- Long jump – 6.53 (Sumy 2014)
- Triple jump – 13.29 (Sumy 2011)
