= Anna Jagaciak-Michalska =

Polish long and triple jumper

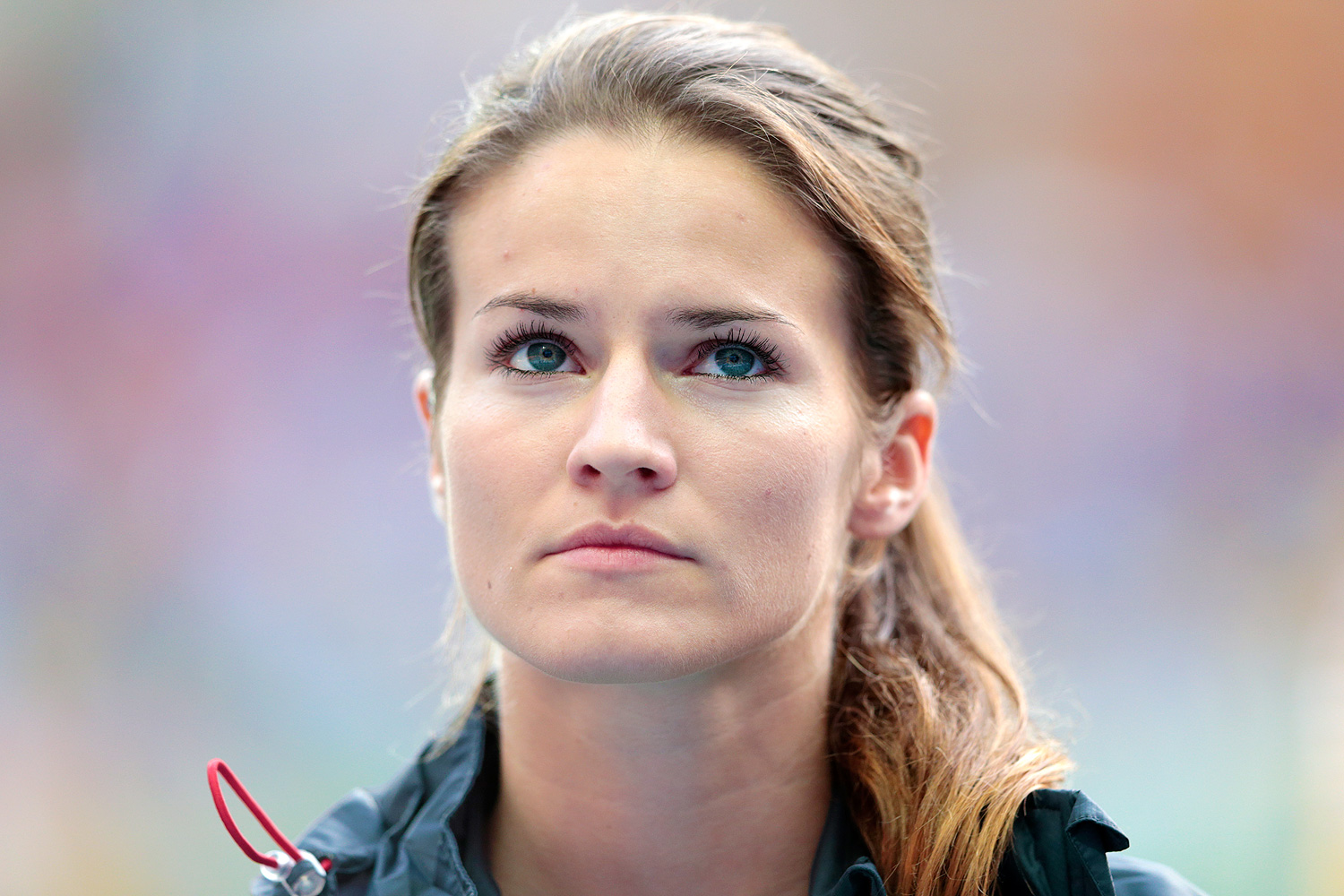
- Anna Jagaciak at 2013 World Championships in Athletics

Personal information
- Born: 10 February 1990 (age 36)
- Height: 1.77 m (5 ft 10 in)
- Weight: 59 kg (130 lb)

Sport
- Country: Poland
- Sport: Athletics
- Event: Women's Triple Jump
Medal record
Women's athletics
Representing Poland
European U23 Championships
Bronze medal – third place	2011 Ostrava	triple jump
Universiade
Silver medal – second place	2013 Kazan	Triple jump
Silver medal – second place	2015 Gwangju	Long jump
Bronze medal – third place	2015 Gwangju	Triple jump

Anna Jagaciak-Michalska (born 10 February 1990 in Zielona Góra) is a retired Polish long and triple jumper. She won three medals in total at Summer Universiades. In addition she finished sixth at the 2017 World Championships and just behind the podium at the 2016 European Championships and 2017 European Indoor Championships.

In July 2014, she married Polish pole vaulter Łukasz Michalski. Her younger sister, Monika Jagaciak, is an internationally known model.

She retired from athletics in 2019 to focus on photography.

== International competitions ==
Year	Competition	Venue	Position	Event	Notes
Representing Poland
2007	World Youth Championships	Ostrava, Czech Republic	13th (q)	Long jump	5.89 m
2007	European Youth Olympic Festival	Belgrade, Serbia	5th	Long jump	5.98 m
2007	European Youth Olympic Festival	Belgrade, Serbia	10th	Triple jump	12.22 m
2007	European Youth Olympic Festival	Belgrade, Serbia	–	4 × 100 m relay	DNF
2008	World Junior Championships	Bydgoszcz, Poland	7th	Long jump	6.27 m (-2.0 m/s)
2008	World Junior Championships	Bydgoszcz, Poland	14th (q)	Triple jump	12.97 m (0.0 m/s)
2009	European Junior Championships	Novi Sad, Serbia	2nd	Long jump	6.46 m
2010	European Championships	Barcelona, Spain	10th	Long jump	6.36 m
2010	European Championships	Barcelona, Spain	15th (q)	Triple jump	14.03 m
2011	European U23 Championships	Ostrava, Czech Republic	4th	Long jump	6.62 m (+1.8 m/s)
2011	European U23 Championships	Ostrava, Czech Republic	3rd	Triple jump	13.86 m (0.0 m/s)
2011	Universiade	Shenzhen, China	7th	Long jump	6.40 m
2011	Universiade	Shenzhen, China	15th (q)	Triple jump	13.15 m
2011	World Championships	Daegu, South Korea	28th (q)	Triple jump	13.57 m
2012	European Championships	Helsinki, Finland	23rd (q)	Long jump	6.16 m
2013	Universiade	Kazan, Russia	7th	Long jump	6.32 m
2013	Universiade	Kazan, Russia	2nd	Triple jump	14.21 m
2013	World Championships	Moscow, Russia	10th	Triple jump	13.95 m
2014	World Indoor Championships	Sopot, Poland	11th (q)	Triple jump	13.57 m
2014	European Championships	Zürich, Switzerland	15th (q)	Triple jump	13.59 m
2015	Universiade	Gwangju, South Korea	2nd	Long jump	6.57 m
2015	Universiade	Gwangju, South Korea	3rd	Triple jump	13.81 m
2016	European Championships	Amsterdam, Netherlands	4th	Triple jump	14.40 (w)
2016	Olympic Games	Rio de Janeiro, Brazil	10th	Triple jump	14.07 m
2017	European Indoor Championships	Belgrade, Serbia	4th	Triple jump	14.14 m
2017	World Championships	London, United Kingdom	6th	Triple jump	14.25 m
2018	European Championships	Berlin, Germany	14th (q)	Triple jump	14.01 m
