= 2017 World Championships in Athletics – Women's long jump =

Women's long jump at the 2017 World Championships
- Venue: Olympic Stadium
- Dates: 9 August (qualification); 11 August (final)
- Competitors: 30 from 21 nations
- Winning distance: 7.02

Medalists
gold medal	Brittney Reese	United States
silver medal	Darya Klishina	Authorised Neutral Athletes
bronze medal	Tianna Bartoletta	United States

Video on YouTube Official Video

The women's long jump at the 2017 World Championships in Athletics was held at the Olympic Stadium on 9 and 11 August.

== Summary ==
In 2016, Darya Klishina was notable as the only Russian athlete allowed to participate in the Olympic track and field schedule, finishing 9th. Here as an Authorised Neutral Athlete, she made her mark on the athletic field taking the early lead with a 6.78 metre jump in the first round. Later in the round Brittney Reese pulled close with her 6.75 metres. With her 6.96 metres, Ivana Španović jumped into the lead near the beginning of the second round. Klishina followed with an improvement to 6.88 metres. Near the end of the third round, Reese hit her 7.02 metres which turned out to be the winner. Reese didn't hit another fair jump, but didn't need to. Klishina improved in the fourth round but didn't change her place until her 7.00 metres in the fifth round put her into silver. On her final attempt, defending champion and Olympic champion Tianna Bartoletta moved from fifth to third with a 6.97 metre jump. Klishina joined Sergey Shubenkov as the second medalist of the Authorised Neutral Athletes, both silver.

Reese became the second athlete after Valerie Adams to win a World Championship in the same event four times.

== Records ==
Before the competition records were as follows:

Record	Perf.	Athlete	Nat.	Date	Location
World	7.52	Galina Chistyakova	URS	11 Jun 1988	Leningrad, Soviet Union
Championship	7.36	Jackie Joyner-Kersee	USA	4 Sep 1987	Rome, Italy
World leading	7.13	Brittney Reese	USA	17 Jun 2017	Chula Vista, United States
African	7.12	Chioma Ajunwa	NGR	2 Aug 1996	Atlanta, United States
Asian	7.01	Yao Weili	CHN	5 Jun 1993	Jinan, China
NACAC	7.49	Jackie Joyner-Kersee	USA	22 May 1994	New York City, United States
NACAC	7.49	Jackie Joyner-Kersee	USA	31 Jul 1994	Sestriere, Italy
South American	7.26	Maurren Higa Maggi	BRA	26 Jun 1999	Bogotá, Colombia
European	7.52	Galina Chistyakova	URS	11 Jun 1988	Leningrad, Soviet Union
Oceanian	7.05	Brooke Stratton	AUS	12 Mar 2016	Perth, Australia

No records were set at the competition.

== Qualification standard ==
The standard to qualify automatically for entry was 6.75 metres.

== Schedule ==
The event schedule, in local time (UTC+1), is as follows:

Date	Time	Round
9 August	19:10	Qualification
11 August	19:10	Final

== Results ==
=== Qualification ===
The qualification round took place on 9 August, in two groups, both starting at 19:10. Athletes attaining a mark of at least 6.70 metres ( Q ) or at least the 12 best performers ( q ) qualified for the final. The overall results were as follows: In rainy conditions, no athlete was able to make the automatic qualifying mark.

Rank	Group	Name	Nationality	Round			Mark	Notes
Rank	Group	Name	Nationality	1	2	3	Mark	Notes
1	A	Darya Klishina	Authorised Neutral Athletes	6.51	6.66	x	6.66	q
2	A	Tianna Bartoletta	United States	6.64	x	6.48	6.64	q
3	B	Lorraine Ugen	Great Britain & N.I.	6.63	x	x	6.63	q
4	A	Ivana Španović	Serbia	6.62	r		6.62	q
5	A	Lauma Grīva	Latvia	6.50	6.58	-	6.58	q
6	A	Claudia Salman-Rath	Germany	x	6.42	6.52	6.52	q
7	A	Chantel Malone	British Virgin Islands	6.52	x	x	6.52	q
8	B	Blessing Okagbare	Nigeria	6.21	6.51	x	6.51	q
9	B	Brittney Reese	United States	6.50	6.46	6.47	6.50	q
10	A	Alina Rotaru	Romania	6.23	6.50	6.45	6.50	q
11	B	Brooke Stratton	Australia	6.43	6.46	6.43	6.46	q
12	B	Eliane Martins	Brazil	6.46	6.41	x	6.46	q
13	A	Shara Proctor	Great Britain & N.I.	6.07	6.26	6.45	6.45	
14	A	Quanesha Burks	United States	6.12	6.04	6.44	6.44	
15	B	Nektaria Panagi	Cyprus	6.43	6.29	6.33	6.43	
16	B	Khaddi Sagnia	Sweden	x	x	6.42	6.42	
17	A	Ese Brume	Nigeria	6.16	6.29	6.38	6.38	
18	A	Maryna Bekh	Ukraine	6.35	6.36	6.33	6.36	
19	B	Christabel Nettey	Canada	6.36	6.20	6.15	6.36	
20	A	Jazmin Sawyers	Great Britain & N.I.	6.17	5.98	6.34	6.34	
21	B	Shakeelah Saunders	United States	6.25	6.32	6.24	6.32	
22	A	Naa Anang	Australia	6.22	5.07	6.27	6.27	
23	B	Alexandra Wester	Germany	x	5.95	6.27	6.27	
24	B	Laura Strati	Italy	6.21	x	6.19	6.21	
25	A	Ksenija Balta	Estonia	x	5.81	6.15	6.15	
26	B	Haido Alexouli	Greece	x	5.94	x	5.94	
27	B	Angela Moroșanu	Romania	5.79	5.39	5.92	5.92	
28	B	Bianca Stuart	Bahamas	4.25	x	5.91	5.91	
29	B	Jessamyn Sauceda	Mexico	5.61	5.42	5.46	5.61	
30	A	Rellie Kaputin	Papua New Guinea	x	5.59	x	5.59	

=== Final ===
The final took place on 11 August at 19:10. The start list was as follows:

Rank	Name	Nationality	Round						Mark	Notes
Rank	Name	Nationality	1	2	3	4	5	6	Mark	Notes
1st place, gold medalist(s)	Brittney Reese	United States	6.75	x	7.02	x	x	x	7.02	
2nd place, silver medalist(s)	Darya Klishina	Authorised Neutral Athletes	6.78	6.88	x	6.91	7.00	6.83	7.00	SB
3rd place, bronze medalist(s)	Tianna Bartoletta	United States	6.56	6.60	x	6.64	6.88	6.97	6.97	
4	Ivana Španović	Serbia	x	6.96	6.77	x	x	6.91	6.96	
5	Lorraine Ugen	Great Britain & N.I.	x	x	6.72	x	x	6.40	6.72	
6	Brooke Stratton	Australia	6.27	6.54	6.67	6.55	6.67	6.64	6.67	
7	Chantel Malone	British Virgin Islands	6.52	6.44	6.57	x	x	6.52	6.57	
8	Blessing Okagbare	Nigeria	6.40	6.55	6.47	6.49	x	6.31	6.55	
9	Lauma Grīva	Latvia	6.54	x	6.42				6.54	
10	Claudia Salman-Rath	Germany	6.39	6.29	6.54				6.54	
11	Eliane Martins	Brazil	6.52	x	x				6.52	
12	Alina Rotaru	Romania	6.29	6.20	6.46				6.46	
