= Athletics at the 2015 Summer Universiade – Women's long jump =

The women's long jump event at the 2015 Summer Universiade was held on 8 and 9 July at the Gwangju Universiade Main Stadium, Gwangju, Korea.

== Medalists ==
Gold	Silver	Bronze
Yuliya Pidluzhnaya; Russia	Anna Jagaciak-Michalska; Poland	Naa Anang; Australia

== Results ==
=== Qualification ===
Qualification: 6.25 m (Q) or at least 12 best (q) qualified for the final.

Rank	Group	Athlete	Nationality	#1	#2	#3	Result	Notes
1	B	Yuliya Pidluzhnaya	Russia	6.20	6.47		6.47	Q
2	A	Nektaria Panayi	Cyprus	6.22	6.05	6.31	6.31	Q
3	B	Naa Anang	Australia	x	6.15	6.29	6.29	Q
4	B	Nataliyah Friar	United States	6.29			6.29	Q
5	A	Yana Nikulina	Russia	6.27			6.27	Q
6	A	Anna Jagaciak-Michalska	Poland	6.05	6.22	6.19	6.22	q
7	A	Milena Mitkova	Bulgaria	6.14	6.05	6.20	6.20	q
8	A	Kylie Price	United States	6.05	6.09	6.19	6.19	q
9	B	Noor Amira Mohamad Nafiah	Malaysia	6.16	5.74	5.82	6.16	q
10	B	Sanna Nygaard	Finland	6.15	x	6.12	6.15	q
11	B	Jiang Yanfei	China	x	x	6.08	6.08	q
12	B	Vivien Fanni Schmelcz	Hungary	6.06	x	6.06	6.06	q
13	A	Alejandra Maldonado	Mexico	6.04	5.90	5.72	6.04	PB
14	A	Mariah Ririnui	New Zealand	x	6.04	x	6.04	
15	A	Laurence Beaudet	Canada	x	5.98	5.97	5.98	
16	B	Anna Kornuta	Ukraine	5.98	5.70	5.90	5.98	
17	A	Zinzi Chabangu	South Africa	x	x	5.87	5.87	
18	A	Bae Chan-mi	South Korea	5.83	5.83	5.50	5.83	
19	B	María Victoria Fernández	Chile	5.52	5.74	5.59	5.74	
19	B	Nathalee Aranda	Panama	5.72	5.48	5.72	5.72	
20	A	Bhumika Thakur	India	x	5.59	5.69	5.69	
21	B	Karabo Buzwani	Botswana	5.63	5.42	5.45	5.63	
22	A	Reesika Adojaan	Estonia	5.58	x	5.43	5.58	
23	A	Diane Kiendrebeogo	Burkina Faso	5.51	5.54	5.47	5.54	
24	B	Sibongile Ntshingila	South Africa	5.39	5.45	x	5.45	
25	A	Anna Bulanova	Kyrgyzstan	x	5.44	5.22	5.44	
26	A	Macarena Borie	Chile	x	5.35	x	5.35	
27	B	Mary Unyuthfua	Uganda	x	4.35	5.28	5.28	
28	B	Vindya Rillagodage	Sri Lanka	x	4.84	4.94	4.94	
29	B	Ariana Gutiérrez	Venezuela	4.50	4.38	4.80	4.80	
29	B	Aida Belamri	Algeria	x	4.71	4.72	4.72	
	A	Euphemia Edem	Nigeria				DNS	

=== Final ===
Official Video

Rank	Athlete	Nationality	#1	#2	#3	#4	#5	#6	Result	Notes
1st place, gold medalist(s)	Yuliya Pidluzhnaya	Russia	6.64	6.48	6.79	6.44	6.44	6.58	6.79	SB
2nd place, silver medalist(s)	Anna Jagaciak-Michalska	Poland	6.54	6.50	6.53	6.57	6.42	6.49	6.57	SB
3rd place, bronze medalist(s)	Naa Anang	Australia	6.36	6.55	6.39	6.36	6.35	x	6.55	PB
4	Nektaria Panayi	Cyprus	6.44	x	6.52	x	6.33	6.18	6.52	SB
5	Nataliyah Friar	United States	x	6.16	6.27	6.42	6.27	6.27	6.42	PB
6	Sanna Nygaard	Finland	6.33	6.26	x	6.13	6.24	6.09	6.33	PB
7	Milena Mitkova	Bulgaria	6.31	5.98	6.08	6.19	5.79	5.57	6.31	
8	Kylie Price	United States	6.21	x	6.28	6.24	6.09	6.03	6.28	
9	Yana Nikulina	Russia	6.20	6.12	x				6.20	
10	Vivien Fanni Schmelcz	Hungary	6.05	x	5.96				6.05	
11	Jiang Yanfei	China	5.88	x	5.91				5.91	
	Noor Amira Mohamad Nafiah	Malaysia	x	x	x				NM	
