= Anna Lunyova =

Ukrainian long jumper

Anna Lunyova (born October 1, 1991) is a Ukrainian long jumper. She competed at the 2016 Summer Olympics in the women's long jump; her result of 6.15 meters in the qualifying round did not qualify her for the final.
