= Maiko Gogoladze =

Georgian long jumper

Maiko Gogoladze (Georgian: მაიკო გოგოლაძე; born 9 September 1991 in Orenburg, Russian SFSR) is a Georgian long jumper. She competed in the long jump event at the 2012 Summer Olympics.
