= Janay DeLoach Soukup =

American track and field athlete

Janay DeLoach
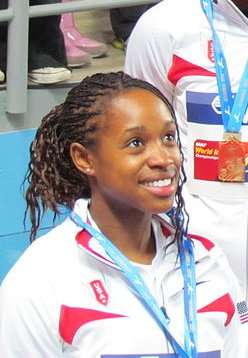

Personal information
- Full name: Cynithia DeLoach Soukup
- Nickname: Nay
- Nationality: American
- Born: October 12, 1985 (age 40) Panama City, Florida, U.S.
- Home town: Fort Collins, Colorado, U.S.
- Height: 5 ft 5 in (165 cm)
- Weight: 128 lb (58 kg)

Sport
- Sport: Track and field
- Event(s): Long jump and hurdles
- College team: Colorado State
Medal record
Women's athletics
Representing the United States
Olympic Games
Bronze medal – third place	2012 London	Long jump
World Indoor Championships
Silver medal – second place	2012 Istanbul	Long jump

Cynithia "Janay" DeLoach Soukup (born October 12, 1985) is a United States track and field athlete who won the bronze medal in the women's long jump at the 2012 Summer Olympics. She was listed in The Coloradoan's #3 Top Sports Story of 2011 about her road to the 2012 Olympics. She is currently signed to Nike and trains in Colorado.

== Early years ==
She graduated from Ben Eielson High School located in Eielson AFB, Alaska May 19, 2003. Janay Deloach grew up as a "military brat" living in many different places but Eielson AFB and the Ravens became her home. She played basketball and track for the Ravens throughout high school and was even on the cheerleading team in her freshman year. She was the leading scorer for the Lady Ravens basketball team with quite a few scholarship opportunities as well.

She was recruited for scholarships in track and field as well as basketball and academics. She went to college at Colorado State University for track and field in the fall of 2003.

== Professional career ==
She was 21st in the long jump at the U.S. 2008 Summer Olympic Trials for the long jump She won the long jump at the Birmingham Grand Prix meeting and was sixth in the event at the 2011 World Championships in Athletics. She won her first major medal at the 2012 IAAF World Indoor Championships, coming second to Brittney Reese with a clearance of 6.98 m.

=== 2012 U.S. Olympic Trials ===
Janay competed in the 2012 U.S. Olympic Trials in Eugene, Oregon from June 29-July 1, 2012. While there she managed to earn the number three spot in the U.S. long jump finals with a jump of 7.03m (her career-best). With a new career-best jump she made the 2012 U.S. Olympic team for long jump and qualified to compete in London in August 2012.

=== 2012 Olympics ===
At the 2012 Summer Olympics, Janay won the bronze medal with a jump of 6.89 m.

=== 2014 US Indoor Track and Field Championships ===
Janay finished 2nd in New Mexico at the 2014 USA Indoor Track and Field Championships in the 60-meter hurdles with a time of 7.82 seconds.

=== 2014 IAAF World Indoor Championships ===
At the 2014 World Indoor Athletics Championships, Janay competed in the women's 60 m hurdles. She finished 2nd in her prelim (8.01 seconds), 2nd in her semifinal (7.93 seconds) and 5th in the World Final (7.90 seconds).

=== 2015 IAAF World Outdoor Championships ===
Janay competed in the long jump after qualifying at the 2015 USA Outdoor Track and Field Championships with a jump of 6.95m off her opposite leg (right leg). She qualified for the final with a jump of 6.68 m. In the World Championship final, she finished in 8th place with a jump of 6.67 m.

=== 2016 U.S. Olympic Trials ===
Janay took third in the long jump at the trials in Eugene, Oregon.

=== 2016 Summer Olympics ===
The final US representative for Women's Long Jump, she was the only one of the three (the other two being eventual gold and silver medalists Tianna Bartoletta and Brittney Reese) to miss the final, missing out by .03 metres.

== Personal life ==
Janay Deloach was born to Dede and William Deloach on October 12, 1985. She graduated from Colorado State University with a bachelor's degree in psychology and human development and family studies and a master's degree in occupational therapy. She formerly married fellow CSU athlete Patrick Soukup; the couple later divorced, but have since been remarried. They are expecting their first child together in 2018.
