= Sosthene Moguenara =

German long jumper (born 1989)

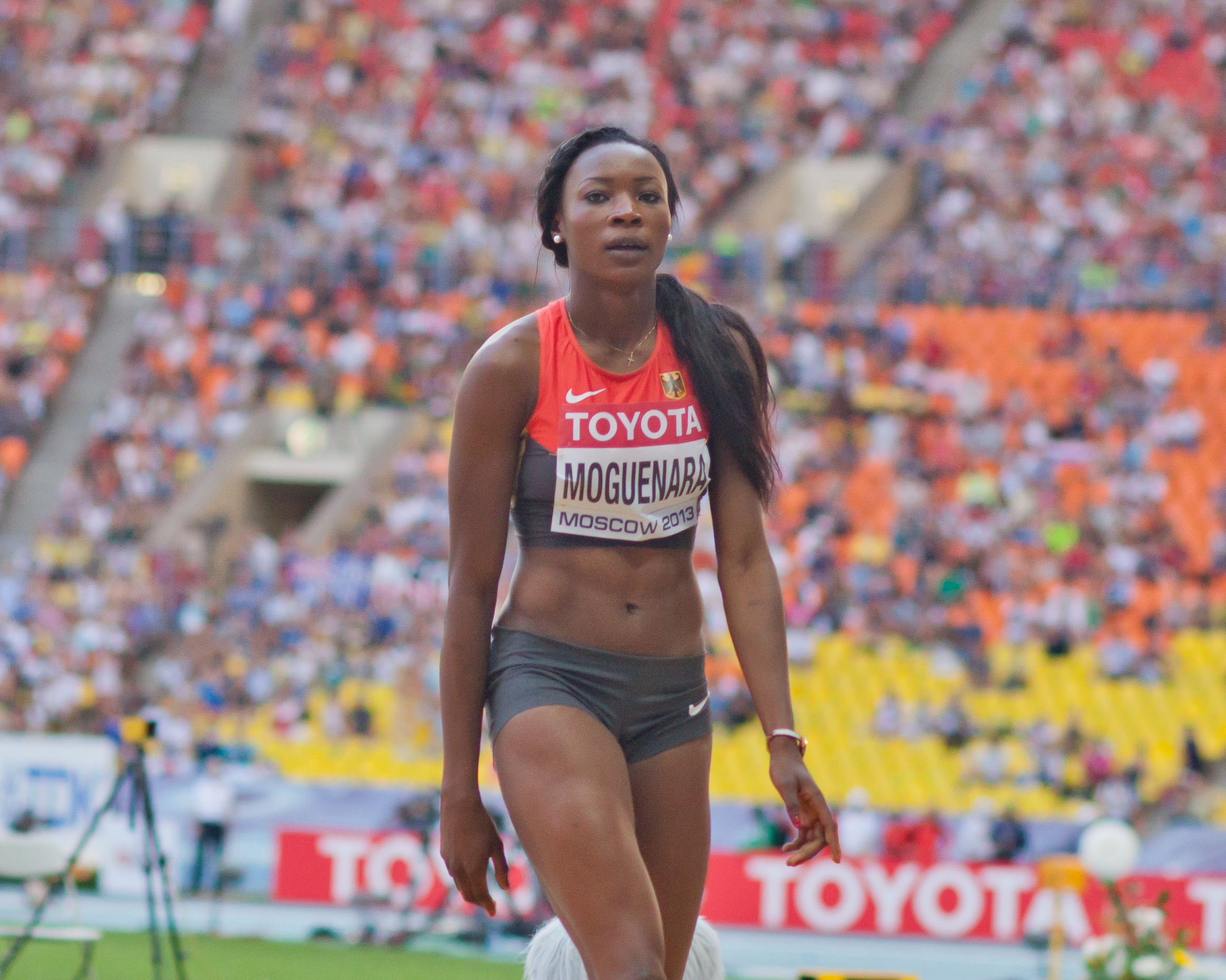
- Moguenara at the 2013 World Championships

Personal information
- Born: October 17, 1989 (age 36) Sarh, Chad
- Height: 1.76 m (5 ft 9 in)
- Weight: 65 kg (143 lb)

Sport
- Country: Germany
- Sport: Athletics
- Event: Long jump
- Club: TV Wattenscheid 01

Achievements and titles
- Personal best: Long jump: 7.16 m (2016)
Medal record
Women's athletics
Representing Germany
World Indoor Championships
Bronze medal – third place	2018 Birmingham	Long jump
European Indoor Championships
Silver medal – second place	2015 Prague	Long jump

Sosthene-Taroum Moguenara (born 17 October 1989) is a German long jumper. She competed at the 2012 Summer Olympics in London, but failed to qualify for the final. In 2011 Moguenara won the bronze medal at the European Athletics U23 Championships in Ostrava.

== Competition record ==
Year	Competition	Venue	Position	Event	Notes
Representing Germany
2009	European U23 Championships	Kaunas, Lithuania	4th	Long jump	6.69 m w (+4.8 m/s)
2010	World Indoor Championships	Doha, Qatar	11th (q)	Long jump	6.37 m
2011	European U23 Championships	Ostrava, Czech Republic	3rd	Long jump	6.74 m
2011	World Championships	Daegu, South Korea	31st (q)	Long jump	6.02 m
2012	European Championships	Helsinki, Finland	4th	Long jump	6.66 m
2012	Olympic Games	London, United Kingdom	21st (q)	Long jump	6.23 m
2013	World Championships	Moscow, Russia	12th	Long jump	6.42 m
2014	World Indoor Championships	Sopot, Poland	10th (q)	Long jump	6.44 m
2014	European Championships	Zurich, Switzerland	9th	Long jump	6.38 m
2015	European Indoor Championships	Prague, Czech Republic	2nd	Long jump	6.83 m
2015	World Championships	Beijing, China	27th (q)	Long jump	6.23 m
2016	Olympic Games	Rio de Janeiro, Brazil	10th	Long jump	6.61 m
2018	World Indoor Championships	Birmingham, United Kingdom	3rd	Long jump	6.85 m
2018	European Championships	Berlin, Germany	17th (q)	Long jump	6.54 m
