= Darya Klishina =

Russian long jumper

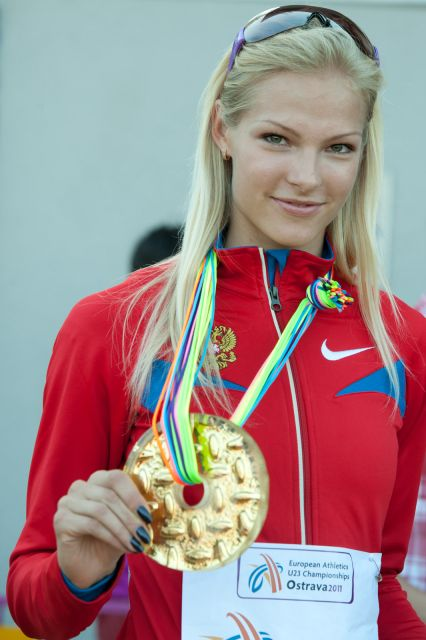
- Klishina at the 2011 European Athletics U23 Championships

Personal information
- Native name: Дарья Игоревна Клишина
- Full name: Darya Igorevna Klishina
- Nationality: Russian
- Born: 15 January 1991 (age 35) Tver, Russian SFSR, Soviet Union
- Height: 1.80 m (5 ft 11 in)

Sport
- Country: Russia
- Sport: Women's athletics
- Event: Long jump

Achievements and titles
- Personal best: Long jump: 7.05 m (Ostrava 2011)
Medal record
European Championships
Bronze medal – third place	2014 Zürich	Long jump
European Indoor Championships
Gold medal – first place	2011 Paris	Long jump
Gold medal – first place	2013 Gothenburg	Long jump
Universiade
Gold medal – first place	2013 Kazan	Long jump
Representing Authorised Neutral Athletes
World Championships
Silver medal – second place	2017 London	Long jump

Darya Igorevna Klishina (Russian: Дарья Игоревна Клишина, born 15 January 1991) is a Russian long jumper.

== Early life ==
Klishina was born in 1991 in Tver, Russian SFSR. At the age of eight, she began playing volleyball, and at thirteen changed her preference for athletics in long jump.

== Career ==
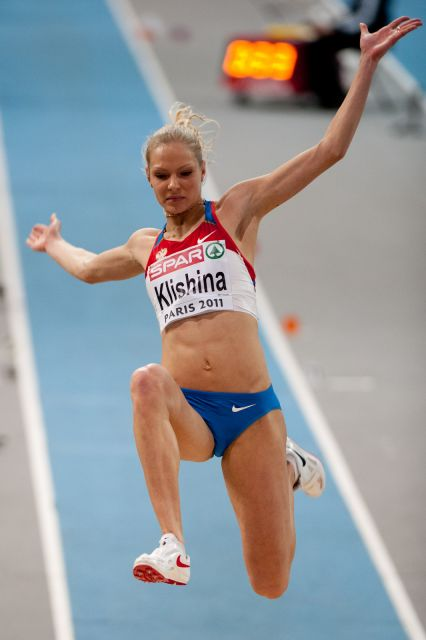
Klishina at the 2011 European Athletics Indoor Championships

Klishina achieved a jump of 7.03 metres on 26 June 2010, a Russian junior record, and the second best junior mark of all time. This jump was also the second best jump in the world that year, behind only her teammate Olga Kucherenko's mark of 7.13 metres. Despite her dominance in the long jump in 2010, Klishina did not compete at the 2010 World Junior Championships in Athletics. In 2013, she moved from Russia to the United States.

In 2016, Klishina was approved to compete at the 2016 Summer Olympics through special permission granted by the IAAF. The IAAF had suspended the Russian national federation from competing due to breach of anti-doping rules, and Klishina was the only member of the athletics team allowed to compete. This decision was initially reversed on 13 August 2016. Klishina immediately appealed the decision, saying that she was "a clean athlete and have proved that already many times and beyond any doubt. Based in the US for three years now, I have been almost exclusively tested outside of the Anti-Doping system in question. I am falling victim to those who created a system of manipulating our beautiful sport and is guilty of using it for political purposes.". During the appeal process it came to light that a doping test from 26 February 2014 had shown a testosterone to epitestosterone ratio of 8.5% which was well over the legal limit. The sample was subject to a "save" order by the Russian Ministry of Sport on 3 March 2014 and subsequently recorded in the Moscow Laboratory notes as an inconclusive result and reported negative in the Anti-Doping Administration and Management System (ADAMS). However, no action was taken against her.

On 15 August 2016, the eve of the long jump event, Klishina's appeal was upheld, allowing her to compete. She qualified for the long jump final, finishing ninth. For the first time in 20 years, Russian women failed to win an Olympic medal in the long jump.

Klishina competed as an authorised neutral athlete at the 2017 World Championships in Athletics in London. She won the silver medal with a season-best jump of 7.00 metres.

== Personal life ==
Since 2013, she has been living and training in the USA.

Klishina is married. She has sons born in 2018 and 2022.

== International competitions ==
Year	Competition	Venue	Position	Notes
Representing Russia
2007	World Youth Championships	Ostrava, Czech Republic	1st	6.47 m
2007	European Youth Olympics	Belgrade, Serbia	1st	6.43 m
2009	European Junior Championships	Novi Sad, Serbia	1st	6.80 m
2010	World Indoor Championships	Doha, Qatar	5th	6.62 m
2011	European Indoor Championships	Paris, France	1st	6.80 m
2011	European U23 Championships	Ostrava, Czech Republic	1st	7.05 m
2011	World Championships	Daegu, South Korea	7th	6.50 m
2012	World Indoor Championships	Istanbul, Turkey	4th	6.85 m
2013	European Indoor Championships	Gothenburg, Sweden	1st	7.01 m
2013	Universiade	Kazan, Russia	1st	6.90 m
2013	World Championships	Moscow, Russia	7th	6.76 m
2014	World Indoor Championships	Sopot, Poland	7th	6.51 m
2014	European Championships	Zürich, Switzerland	3rd	6.65 m
2015	World Championships	Beijing, China	10th	6.65 m
2016	Olympic Games	Rio de Janeiro, Brazil	9th	6.63 m
Competing for Authorised Neutral Athletes
2017	European Indoor Championships	Belgrade, Serbia	4th	6.84 m
2017	World Championships	London, United Kingdom	2nd	7.00 m
2021	Olympic Games	Tokyo, Japan	–	NM

== Personal bests ==
Event	Best (m)	Venue	Date
Long jump (outdoor)	7.05 (1.1 m/s)	Ostrava, Czech Republic	17 July 2011
Long jump (indoor)	7.01	Gothenburg, Sweden	2 March 2013

== See also ==
- List of World Athletics Championships medalists (women)
- List of European Athletics Championships medalists (women)
- List of European Athletics Indoor Championships medalists (women)
- List of sports rivalries
