= Laura Strati =

Italian long jumper (born 1990)

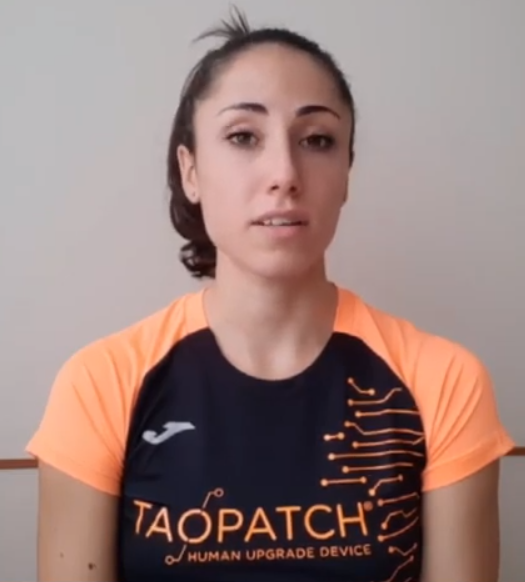
- Laura Strati in 2022.

Personal information
- Nickname: Lalla
- National team: Italy (10 caps)
- Born: 3 October 1990 (age 35) Bassano del Grappa
- Height: 1.70 m (5 ft 7 in)
- Weight: 59 kg (130 lb)

Sport
- Country: Italy
- Sport: Athletics
- Event: Long jump
- Club: Atletica Vicentina
- Coached by: Daniele Chiurato

Achievements and titles
- Personal bests: 6.72 m outdoor (2017); 6.66 m indoor (2021)

Laura Strati (born 3 October 1990) is an Italian long jumper.

== Biography ==
She finished 9th at the 2017 European Athletics Indoor Championships and has won seven times at the Italian Athletics Championships. she has 10 caps in senior national team from 2015. She lives in Madrid from 2017 where she works as interpreter.

== Personal best ==
- Long jump: 6.72, (Spain) Avila, 15 July 2017

== Progression ==
Personal best

Outdoor

Year (age)	Performance	Venue	Date	World Ranking
2021 (30)	6.52	(Italy) Savona	13 May	
2020 (29)	6.38	(Italy) Vicenza	11 July	
2019 (28)	6.65	(Italy) Venezia	2 June	
2018 (27)	6.62	(Italy) Nembro	5 July	52nd
2017 (26)	6.72	(Spain) Avila	15 June	20th
2016 (25)	6.59	(Slovenia) Ljubljana	10 July	62nd
2011 (20)	6.36	(Czech Republic) Ostrava	17 July	

Indoor

Year (age)	Performance	Venue	Date	World Ranking
2021 (30)	6.66	(Italy) Ancona	24 January	
2017 (26)	6.59	(Italy) Ancona	19 February	15th
2015 (24)	6.53	(Italy) Padua	22 February	28th
2011 (20)	6.29	(Italy) Ancona	12 February	
2009 (18)	6.07	(Italy) Ancona	15 February	

== Achievements ==
Year	Competition	Venue	Position	Event	Measure	Notes
2011	European U23 Championships	(Czech Republic) Ostrava	6th	Long jump	6.36 m	PB
2015	European Indoor Championships	(Czech Republic) Prague	17th	Long jump	6.22 m	
2017	European Indoor Championships	(Serbia) Belgrade	9th	Long jump	6.49 m	
2017	European Team Championships	(France) Villeneuve-d'Ascq	6th	Long jump	6.35 m	
2017	World Championships	(United Kingdom) London	24th (q)	Long jump	6.21 m	
2021	European Indoor Championships	(Poland) Toruń	6th	Long jump	6.57 m	

== National titles ==
She won seven national championships.

- 3 wins in the long jump outdoor (2016, 2017, 2018)
- 4 wins in the long jump indoor (2011, 2012, 2017, 2020)

== See also ==
- Italian all-time lists - Long jump
