= Svetlana Biryukova =

Russian track and field athlete

Svetlana Sergeevna Biryukova (née Denyaeva; Russian: Светлана Сергеевна Бирюкова (Деняева); born 1 April 1991) is a Russian track and field athlete who specialises in the long jump. Her personal best for the event is 6.98 m (22 ft 10 3/4 in), set indoors in 2014.

She served a two-year ban for doping between 2014 and 2016.

== Career ==
Born in Saint Petersburg, she competing in national long jump competitions as a teenager and cleared a personal best of 6.18 m (20 ft 3 1/4 in) in 2007. Her performances stagnated until 2010, when she improved to 6.28 m (20 ft 7 in). That year she won the Russian junior athletics indoor championships and was runner-up at the outdoor meeting.

Biryukova added the triple jump to her oeuvre the following year. She set personal bests at the Russian under-23 championships, winning the triple jump in 13.68 m (44 ft 10 1/2 in) and finishing second in the long jump with 6.48 m (21 ft 3 in). She represented Russia in both events at the 2011 European Athletics U23 Championships – she was eliminated in long jump qualifying but came eighth in the triple jump final. She refocused on the long jump and made significant improvements in 2012, clearing a best of 6.72 m (22 ft 1/2 in). She came ninth (upgraded to eighth after Karin Melis Mey was disqualified) at the 2012 European Athletics Championships in her first senior international outing, but managed only tenth place at the Russian Athletics Championships. The 2013 season also had mixed fortunes for Biryukova: she set several personal bests (7.50 for the 60 metres, 6.76 m (22 ft 2 in) in the long jump, 13.96 m (45 ft 9 1/2 in) in the triple jump) and placed third at the Russian indoor championships, but did not get past the qualifying of the 2013 European Athletics Indoor Championships – her only outing for Russia that year.

Biryukova had a strong start to 2014. She cleared a world-leading mark of 6.98 m (22 ft 10 3/4 in) at the Moscow Christmas Cup, beating the reigning European indoor champion Darya Klishina. She matched that jump at the Volgograd Governor Cup later that January to beat Tatyana Lebedeva's meeting record. At the Russian indoor championships, Biryukova again got the better of national rival Klishina and won her first national title in the long jump.

She is currently serving a 2-year doping ban for the use of prohibited substances, SARMs. The ban lasts between 26 February 2014 and 3 March 2016.

== Personal bests ==
- 60 metres – 7.50 sec (2013)
- Long jump outdoor – 6.72 m (22 ft 1/2 in) (2012)
- Long jump indoor – 6.98 m (22 ft 10 3/4 in) (2014)
- Triple jump outdoor – 13.68 m (44 ft 10 1/2 in) (2011)
- Triple jump indoor – 13.96 m (45 ft 9 1/2 in) (2013)
