= Karin Melis Mey =

South African-born Turkish long jumper

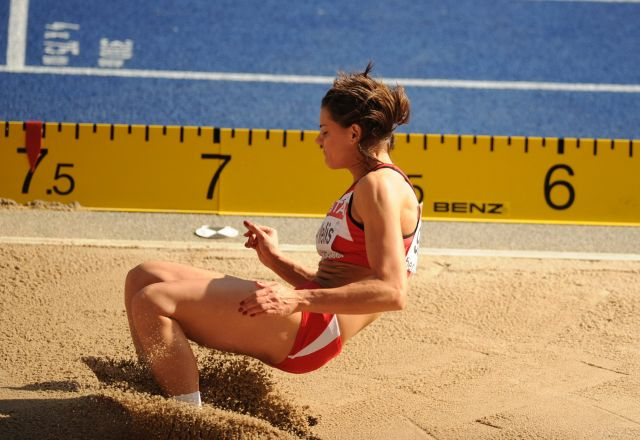

Personal information
- Nationality: Turkey
- Born: Karin Mey; May 31, 1983 (age 43) Pretoria, South Africa
- Height: 172 cm (5 ft 8 in)
- Weight: 55 kg (121 lb)

Sport
- Sport: Long jump
- Club: Fenerbahçe Athletics
- Coached by: Charley Strohmenger

Achievements and titles
- Olympicfinals: London 2012 (DSQ)
- Personal best: 6.93 m (2008)
Medal record
Women's athletics
Representing Turkey
World Championships
Silver medal – second place	2009 Berlin	Long jump

Karin Melis Mey, née Karin Mey, (born 31 May 1983) is a South African-born Turkish female long jumper. She became a naturalised Turkish citizen in June 2008, and took the name Melis in addition to her birth name Karin Mey. The 172 cm (5 ft 8 in) tall athlete at 55 kg (121 lb) is a member of Fenerbahçe Athletics team, where she is coached by Charley Strohmenger.

Representing South Africa, one of her first international appearances was a sixth-place finish at the 2005 Summer Universiade. She represented her adopted country at the 2008 Summer Olympics, competing in the qualifying stages of the long jump. She was also sixth at the 2008 IAAF World Athletics Final that year. Melis Mey qualified for the 2009 European Athletics Indoor Championships but did not make the final. Outdoors she was the silver medallist at the 2009 Mediterranean Games and also in the First League of the 2009 European Team Championships. She won the bronze medal by jumping 6.80 m at the 2009 World Championships in Athletics in Berlin.

She jumped at the 2010 IAAF World Indoor Championships, but did not progress beyond the qualifying round.

Her personal best jump is 6.93 metres, achieved in July 2007 in Bad Langensalza, which is the South African record for the event. In July 2009 she set a Turkish record of 6.87 metres

Mey qualified for participation in long jump event at the 2012 Summer Olympics. She qualified for the final, but was pulled after testing positive for testosterone. The positive sample was from the European Championships.

She received a two-year suspension, which expired on 7 August 2014.

== See also ==
- List of eligibility transfers in athletics
- List of doping cases in athletics
