= 2009 European Athletics U23 Championships – Women's long jump =

The women's long jump event at the 2009 European Athletics U23 Championships was held in Kaunas, Lithuania, at S. Dariaus ir S. Girėno stadionas (Darius and Girėnas Stadium) on 18 and 19 July.

== Medalists ==
Gold	Melanie Bauschke; Germany
Silver	Nastassia Mironchyk; Belarus
Bronze	Éloyse Lesueur; France

== Results ==
=== Final ===
19 July

Rank	Name	Nationality	Attempts						Result	Notes
Rank	Name	Nationality	1	2	3	4	5	6	Result	Notes
1st place, gold medalist(s)	Melanie Bauschke	Germany	6.45 (w: 1.9 m/s)	6.68 w (w: +2.6 m/s)	x	x	6.05 (w: -0.3 m/s)	6.83 (w: -0.3 m/s)	6.83 (w: 0.3 m/s)	
2nd place, silver medalist(s)	Nastassia Mironchyk	Belarus	x	6.76 w (w: 4.7 m/s)	6.58 w (w: 2.4 m/s)	x	x	x	6.76 w (w: 4.7 m/s)	
3rd place, bronze medalist(s)	Éloyse Lesueur	France	6.55 (w: 1.6 m/s)	6.64 (w: 2.0 m/s)	x	6.46 w (w: 3.5 m/s)	x	6.72 w (w: 3.5 m/s)	6.72 w (w: 3.5 m/s)	
4	Sosthene Moguenara	Germany	4.59 w (w: 3.4 m/s)	6.39 (w: 1.7 m/s)	6.43 (w: 2.0 m/s)	x	6.20 w (w: 2.3 m/s)	6.69 w (w: 4.8 m/s)	6.69 w (w: 4.8 m/s)	
5	Cornelia Deiac	Romania	6.49 w (w: 2.1 m/s)	6.61 (w: 1.5 m/s)	6.42 (w: 1.7 m/s)	6.47 (w: 0.7 m/s)	–	–	6.61 (w: 1.5 m/s)	
6	Kelly Proper	Ireland	x	x	6.58 w (w: 2.9 m/s)	6.50 w (w: 2.2 m/s)	5.95 w (w: 2.4 m/s)	6.32 (w: 0.5 m/s)	6.58 w (w: 2.9 m/s)	
7	Irène Pusterla	Switzerland	6.16 (w: 0.8 m/s)	6.27 w (w: 2.7 m/s)	6.54 w (w: 5.0 m/s)	6.32 (w: 1.6 m/s)	6.38 w (w: 3.4 m/s)	6.57 w (w: 4.9 m/s)	6.57 w (w: 4.9 m/s)	
8	Yekaterina Malysheva	Russia	6.57 w (w: 2.4 m/s)	x	x	x	x	6.46 w (w: 2.6 m/s)	6.57 w (w: 2.4 m/s)	
9	Erika Halai	Romania	6.36 w (w: 3.5 m/s)	6.19 w (w: 3.5 m/s)	6.05 w (w: 2.3 m/s)				6.36 w (w: 3.5 m/s)	
10	Clélia Reuse	Switzerland	x	x	6.33 w (w: 3.2 m/s)				6.33 w (w: 3.2 m/s)	
11	Haoua Kessely	France	x	x	6.11 (w: 2.0 m/s)				6.11 (w: 2.0 m/s)	
	Lina Andrijauskaitė	Lithuania	–	–	x				NM	

=== Qualifications ===
18 July
Qualifying 6.35 or 12 best to the Final

==== Group A ====
Rank	Name	Nationality	Result	Notes
1	Sosthene Moguenara	Germany	6.47 (w: -0.7 m/s)	Q
2	Yekaterina Malysheva	Russia	6.44 w (w: 3.1 m/s)	Q
3	Cornelia Deiac	Romania	6.44 (w: 1.3 m/s)	Q
4	Clélia Reuse	Switzerland	6.41 w (w: 2.3 m/s)	Q
5	Kelly Proper	Ireland	6.40 (w: -0.7 m/s)	Q
6	Nastassia Mironchyk	Belarus	6.37 (w: -0.3 m/s)	Q
7	Lina Andrijauskaitė	Lithuania	6.29 w (w: 3.4 m/s)	q
8	Noora Pesola	Finland	6.16 (w: -0.1 m/s)	
9	Keshia Willix	France	6.08 (w: 0.2 m/s)	
10	Emel Güngör	Turkey	5.87 (w: -0.9 m/s)	

==== Group B ====
Rank	Name	Nationality	Result	Notes
1	Melanie Bauschke	Germany	6.50 w (w: 2.3 m/s)	Q
2	Éloyse Lesueur	France	6.49 (w: -0.1 m/s)	Q
3	Erika Halai	Romania	6.29 (w: -0.6 m/s)	q
4	Irène Pusterla	Switzerland	6.27 (w: -0.1 m/s)	q
5	Haoua Kessely	France	6.25 (w: -0.6 m/s)	q
6	Anika Leipold	Germany	6.21 (w: 0.4 m/s)	
7	Małgorzata Reszka	Poland	6.20 (w: 1.4 m/s)	
8	María del Mar Jover	Spain	6.18 (w: -0.4 m/s)	
9	Māra Grīva	Latvia	6.14 (w: 0.0 m/s)	
10	Cristina Radu	Romania	6.12 (w: 0.1 m/s)	
11	Eglė Kondrotaitė	Lithuania	4.63 (w: 0.7 m/s)	

== Participation ==
According to an unofficial count, 21 athletes from 13 countries participated in the event.

- Belarus (1)
- Finland (1)
- France (3)
- Germany (3)
- Ireland (1)
- Latvia (1)
- Lithuania (2)
- Poland (1)
- Romania (3)
- Russia (1)
- Spain (1)
- Switzerland (2)
- Turkey (1)
