= 2011 European Athletics Indoor Championships – Women's long jump =

The women's long jump event at the 2011 European Athletics Indoor Championships was held on 5 and 6 March 2011.

== Records ==
Standing records prior to the 2011 European Athletics Indoor Championships
World record	Heike Drechsler (DDR)	7.37	Vienna, Austria	13 February 1988
European record	Heike Drechsler (DDR)	7.37	Vienna, Austria	13 February 1988
Championship record	Heike Drechsler (DDR)	7.30	Budapest, Hungary	5 March 1988
World Leading	Janay DeLoach (USA)	6.99	Albuquerque, United States	27 February 2011
European Leading	Anna Nazarova (RUS)	6.89	Krasnodar, Russia	29 January 2011

== Results ==
=== Qualification ===
Qualifying perf. 6.60 (Q) or 8 best performers (q) advanced to the Final The qualification was held at 11:30.

Rank	Athlete	Nationality	#1	#2	#3	Result	Note
1	Yuliya Pidluzhnaya	Russia	6.74			6.74	Q, PB
2	Irène Pusterla	Switzerland	6.71			6.71	Q, NR
3	Veronika Shutkova	Belarus	6.67			6.67	Q
4	Darya Klishina	Russia	6.65			6.65	Q
5	Éloyse Lesueur	France	X	6.38	6.61	6.61	Q
6	Cornelia Deiac	Romania	X	6.50	6.60	6.60	Q
7	Naide Gomes	Portugal	6.33	6.46	6.58	6.58	q
8	Nastassia Mironchyk-Ivanova	Belarus	6.26	6.37	6.58	6.58	q
9	Anna Nazarova	Russia	X	6.55	6.57	6.57	
10	Viorica Țigău	Romania	6.41	6.56	6.17	6.56	
11	Lauma Grīva	Latvia	6.53	6.38	X	6.53	PB
12	Concepción Montaner	Spain	6.21	6.35	6.47	6.47	
13	Kelly Proper	Ireland	6.27	6.29	6.45	6.45	SB
14	Cristina Sandu	Romania	6.34	6.44	6.42	6.44	
15	Michelle Weitzel	Germany	6.31	6.28	6.44	6.44	
16	Renáta Medgyesová	Slovakia	X	6.09	6.37	6.37	
17	Nadja Käther	Germany	X	X	6.36	6.36	
18	Nina Kolarič	Slovenia	X	X	6.24	6.24	
19	Jana Velďáková	Slovakia	5.87	6.11	X	6.11	
20	María-Eléni Kafoúrou	Greece	5.72	5.57	5.75	5.75	
—N/a	Aiga Grabuste	Latvia				DNS	

=== Final ===
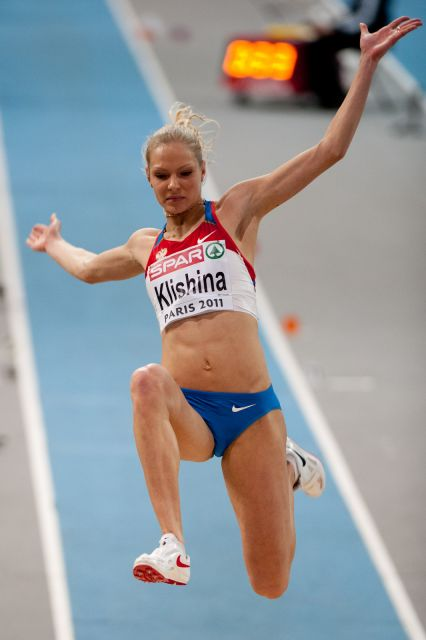
Klishina on her way to gold

Rank	Athlete	Nationality	#1	#2	#3	#4	#5	#6	Result	Note
1st place, gold medalist(s)	Darya Klishina	Russia	X	6.61	6.58	6.73	6.80	6.64	6.80	
2nd place, silver medalist(s)	Naide Gomes	Portugal	6.67	6.63	X	6.79	6.75	X	6.79	SB
3rd place, bronze medalist(s)	Yuliya Pidluzhnaya	Russia	6.58	X	6.54	6.74	6.75	X	6.75	PB
4	Éloyse Lesueur	France	X	X	6.59	6.40	6.44	X	6.59	
5	Veronika Shutkova	Belarus	6.57	X	6.53	X	X	6.56	6.57	
6	Nastassia Mironchyk-Ivanova	Belarus	6.48	6.55	X	6.38	X	6.44	6.55	
7	Cornelia Deiac	Romania	X	6.45	X	6.18	6.37	X	6.45	
8	Irène Pusterla	Switzerland	6.35	6.43	6.42	X	6.35	6.11	6.43	
