= 2009 European Athletics Indoor Championships – Women's long jump =

The women's long jump event at the 2009 European Athletics Indoor Championships was held on March 6–7.

== Medalists ==
| Gold | Silver | Bronze |
|---|---|---|
| Ksenija Balta; Estonia | Yelena Sokolova; Russia | Olga Kucherenko; Russia |

== Results ==
=== Qualification ===
Qualifying performance: 6.55 (Q) or 8 best performers (q) advanced to the Final.

| Rank | Athlete | Nationality | #1 | #2 | #3 | Result | Note |
|---|---|---|---|---|---|---|---|
| 1 | Ksenija Balta | Estonia | 6.43 | x | 6.75 | 6.75 | Q, NR |
| 2 | Yelena Sokolova | Russia | 6.71 | | | 6.71 | Q |
| 3 | Nina Kolarič | Slovenia | 6.51 | 6.67 | | 6.67 | Q, NR |
| 4 | Sirkka-Liisa Kivine | Estonia | x | 6.66 | | 6.66 | Q, PB |
| 5 | Kelly Proper | Ireland | x | 6.59 | | 6.59 | Q, NR |
| 6 | Olga Kucherenko | Russia | 6.58 | | | 6.58 | Q |
| 7 | Joanna Skibińska | Poland | x | x | 6.53 | 6.53 | q |
| 8 | Tatyana Voykina | Russia | x | 6.51 | 6.31 | 6.51 | q |
| 9 | Viorica Țigău | Romania | 6.35 | 6.46 | 6.33 | 6.46 | |
| 10 | Alina Militaru | Romania | x | 6.43 | 6.43 | 6.43 | |
| 11 | Melanie Bauschke | Germany | 6.30 | 6.38 | 6.39 | 6.39 | |
| 12 | Irene Pusterla | Switzerland | 6.03 | x | 6.31 | 6.31 | |
| 13 | Melis Mey | Turkey | x | x | 6.30 | 6.30 | |
| 14 | Jana Veldáková | Slovakia | 6.22 | x | 4.53 | 6.22 | |
| 15 | Cornelia Deiac | Romania | x | 6.22 | – | 6.22 | |
| 16 | Tania Vicenzino | Italy | 6.13 | 6.10 | 6.20 | 6.20 | |
| 17 | Rotem Batat | Israel | 4.66 | 5.98 | 6.04 | 6.04 | PB |
| | Arantza Loureiro | Spain | x | x | – | NM | |

=== Final ===
| Rank | Athlete | Nationality | #1 | #2 | #3 | #4 | #5 | #6 | Result | Note |
|---|---|---|---|---|---|---|---|---|---|---|
| 1st place, gold medalist(s) | Ksenija Balta | Estonia | 6.73 | 6.73 | x | 6.87 | – | 6.79 | 6.87 | NR |
| 2nd place, silver medalist(s) | Yelena Sokolova | Russia | x | 6.73 | 6.63 | x | 6.81 | 6.84 | 6.84 | PB |
| 3rd place, bronze medalist(s) | Olga Kucherenko | Russia | 6.78 | x | 6.73 | 6.73 | 6.56 | 6.82 | 6.82 | |
| 4 | Nina Kolarič | Slovenia | 6.62 | 6.51 | 6.62 | 6.48 | x | 6.47 | 6.62 | |
| 5 | Tatyana Voykina | Russia | 6.57 | x | x | 5.85 | 6.37 | 6.45 | 6.57 | |
| 6 | Sirkka-Liisa Kivine | Estonia | 6.43 | 6.47 | x | x | x | 6.51 | 6.51 | |
| 7 | Kelly Proper | Ireland | 6.32 | x | 5.94 | 6.37 | 6.37 | 6.18 | 6.37 | |
| 8 | Joanna Skibińska | Poland | x | x | 6.28 | 6.18 | x | x | 6.28 | |
