= Athletics at the 2011 Summer Universiade – Women's long jump =

The women's long jump event at the 2011 Summer Universiade was held on 16–17 August.

== Medalists ==
Gold	Silver	Bronze
Anna Nazarova; Russia	Yuliya Pidluzhnaya; Russia	Melanie Bauschke; Germany

== Results ==
=== Qualification ===
Qualification: 6.25 m (Q) or at least 12 best (q) qualified for the final.

Rank	Group	Athlete	Nationality	#1	#2	#3	Result	Notes
1	B	Michelle Weitzel	Germany	6.11	6.41		6.41	Q
2	A	Melanie Bauschke	Germany	6.37			6.37	Q
3	A	Anna Jagaciak	Poland	6.19	6.34		6.34	Q
4	B	Anna Nazarova	Russia	6.34			6.34	Q
5	B	Keila Costa	Brazil	x	6.07	6.32	6.32	Q
6	A	Cornelia Deiac	Romania	6.29			6.29	Q
6	B	Amy Harris	Great Britain	x	6.29		6.29	Q
8	A	Lauma Grīva	Latvia	6.15	6.27		6.27	Q
9	B	Māra Grīva	Latvia	6.23	6.01	6.26	6.26	Q
10	B	Inna Akhozova	Ukraine	6.12	6.25		6.25	Q
11	A	Yuliya Pidluzhnaya	Russia	6.22	x	6.24	6.24	q
12	A	Chen Jiao	China	6.16	5.67	6.16	6.16	q
13	A	Erica Jarder	Sweden	6.14	5.99	6.06	6.14	
14	A	Hanako Kotake	Japan	6.02	6.13	6.01	6.13	
15	B	Liu Xiao	China	6.08	5.99	6.02	6.08	
16	B	Jennifer Cotten	Canada	5.96	6.04	5.99	6.04	
17	A	Elina Torro	Finland	x	6.03	x	6.03	
18	A	María Jover	Spain	x	x	6.01	6.01	
19	B	Rotem Golan	Israel	x	5.95	x	5.95	
20	A	Hanna Knyazyeva	Ukraine	5.94	5.80	x	5.94	
21	A	Lina Andrijauskaitė	Lithuania	5.40	5.93	5.86	5.93	
22	B	Macarena Reyes	Chile	5.79	5.73	5.82	5.82	
23	A	Sibongile Ntshingila	South Africa	5.57	x	5.75	5.75	
24	B	Enirahs Martina	Netherlands Antilles	5.36	5.23	5.46	5.46	
25	B	Lidiya Shakhvorostova	Uzbekistan	x	5.03	5.34	5.34	
26	A	Diala El Khazen	Lebanon	4.73	4.96	5.03	5.03	
27	B	Nighat Kausar	Pakistan	4.89	4.78	x	4.89	
28	A	Onkemetse Ramhikela	Botswana	4.82	4.27	4.45	4.82	
29	B	Denisa Buziu	Albania	x	4.56	4.70	4.70	
30	B	Jana Majed	Lebanon	x	4.42	4.42	4.42	
	A	Ikabongo Ikabongo	Zambia				DNS	
	B	Mwiya Muyatwa	Zambia				DNS	
	B	Sarah Nambawa	Uganda				DNS	

=== Final ===
Rank	Athlete	Nationality	#1	#2	#3	#4	#5	#6	Result	Notes
1st place, gold medalist(s)	Anna Nazarova	Russia	6.72	6.70	x	6.61	6.70	x	6.72	
2nd place, silver medalist(s)	Yuliya Pidluzhnaya	Russia	x	6.42	x	6.44	6.56	x	6.56	
3rd place, bronze medalist(s)	Melanie Bauschke	Germany	6.22	6.25	6.40	6.10	6.51	6.35	6.51	
4	Cornelia Deiac	Romania	x	x	6.36	6.29	6.45	x	6.45	
5	Michelle Weitzel	Germany	6.17	6.39	6.41	6.37	4.76	6.43	6.43	
6	Amy Harris	Great Britain	6.41	6.26	6.25	6.27	6.36	6.21	6.41	
7	Anna Jagaciak	Poland	6.39	5.04	6.25	x	6.40	x	6.40	
8	Chen Jiao	China	6.28	6.05	6.29	6.22	x	5.96	6.29	=SB
9	Inna Akhozova	Ukraine	6.24	6.23	6.21				6.24	
10	Lauma Grīva	Latvia	6.22	x	x				6.22	
11	Keila Costa	Brazil	6.19	x	x				6.19	
12	Māra Grīva	Latvia	x	6.09	6.17				6.17	
