= 2014 European Athletics Championships – Women's long jump =

Women's long jump at the European Athletics Championships

The women's long jump at the 2014 European Athletics Championships took place at the Letzigrund on 12 and 13 August.

== Medalists ==
| Gold | Éloyse Lesueur; France |
| Silver | Ivana Španović; Serbia |
| Bronze | Darya Klishina; Russia |

== Records ==
Standing records prior to the 2014 European Athletics Championships
| World record | Galina Chistyakova (URS) | 7.52 m | Leningrad, Soviet Union | 11 June 1988 |
| European record | Galina Chistyakova (URS) | 7.52 m | Leningrad, Soviet Union | 11 June 1988 |
| Championship record | Heike Drechsler (GDR) | 7.30 m | Split, Yugoslavia | 28 August 1990 |
| World Leading | Tianna Bartoletta (USA) | 7.02 m | Oslo, Norway | 11 June 2014 |
| European Leading | Anna Klyashtornaya (RUS) | 6.93 m | Kazan, Russia | 23 July 2014 |

== Schedule ==
| Date | Time | Round |
|---|---|---|
| 12 August 2014 | 20:07 | Qualification |
| 13 August 2014 | 20:00 | Final |

All times are local times (UTC+2)

== Results ==
=== Qualification ===
6.65 m (Q) or at least 12 best performers (q) advance to the Final.

| Rank | Group | Name | Nationality | #1 | #2 | #3 | Mark | Note |
|---|---|---|---|---|---|---|---|---|
| 1 | B | Éloyse Lesueur | France | x | 6.72 | | 6.72 | Q |
| 2 | A | Malaika Mihambo | Germany | 6.36 | 6.29 | 6.70 | 6.70 | Q |
| 3 | A | Ivana Španović | Serbia | 6.66 | | | 6.66 | Q |
| 3 | B | Darya Klishina | Russia | 6.66 | | | 6.66 | Q |
| 5 | A | Alina Rotaru | Romania | 6.54 | 6.49 | 6.65 | 6.65 | Q |
| 6 | B | Aiga Grabuste | Latvia | 6.51 | 6.46 | 6.65 | 6.65 | Q |
| 7 | A | Melanie Bauschke | Germany | 6.53 | 6.47 | 6.56 | 6.56 | q |
| 8 | A | Anna Klyashtornaya | Russia | 6.53 | 6.41 | x | 6.53 | q |
| 9 | B | Volha Sudareva | Belarus | 6.53 | 6.36 | 6.23 | 6.53 | q |
| 10 | A | Erica Jarder | Sweden | 6.46 | 6.52 | – | 6.52 | q |
| 11 | B | Sosthene Moguenara | Germany | 6.36 | 6.39 | 6.50 | 6.50 | q |
| 12 | B | Nina Djordjevič | Slovenia | 6.11 | 6.44 | 6.29 | 6.44 | q |
| 13 | A | Irène Pusterla | Switzerland | x | 6.39 | x | 6.39 | |
| 14 | B | María del Mar Jover | Spain | 6.36 | x | x | 6.36 | |
| 15 | B | Marharyta Tverdohlib | Ukraine | 6.31 | 6.13 | 6.16 | 6.31 | |
| 16 | A | Hafdís Sigurdardóttir | Iceland | 5.84 | 5.89 | 6.27 | 6.27 | |
| 17 | A | Jana Velďáková | Slovakia | 6.24 | 6.21 | x | 6.24 | |
| 18 | B | Cornelia Deiac | Romania | 5.98 | 6.23 | x | 6.23 | |
| 19 | A | Oksana Zubkovska | Ukraine | 6.19 | x | 6.22 | 6.22 | |
| 20 | B | Tania Vicenzino | Italy | 6.17 | x | 6.22 | 6.22 | |
| 21 | A | Juliet Itoya | Spain | 6.20 | 6.12 | x | 6.20 | |
| 22 | B | Rebecca Camilleri | Malta | 6.10 | 6.17 | 6.08 | 6.17 | |
| 23 | B | Lauma Grīva | Latvia | 6.14 | x | x | 6.14 | |
| 24 | B | Nektaria Panagi | Cyprus | 5.99 | 5.98 | 6.12 | 6.12 | |
| 25 | B | Efthimia Kolokitha | Greece | x | 5.93 | 6.00 | 6.00 | |
| 26 | A | Fanni Schmelcz | Hungary | 5.80 | x | 5.90 | 5.90 | |
| 27 | A | Maiko Gogoladze | Georgia | x | 5.50 | 5.73 | 5.73 | |
| | A | Mara Grīva | Latvia | x | r | | NM | |

=== Final ===
| Rank | Name | Nationality | #1 | #2 | #3 | #4 | #5 | #6 | Result | Notes |
|---|---|---|---|---|---|---|---|---|---|---|
| 1st place, gold medalist(s) | Éloyse Lesueur | France | 6.65 | x | x | 6.85 | x | x | 6.85 | |
| 2nd place, silver medalist(s) | Ivana Španović | Serbia | 6.81 | 6.36 | 6.53 | 6.75 | 6.80 | 6.65 | 6.81 | |
| 3rd place, bronze medalist(s) | Darya Klishina | Russia | 6.38 | 6.41 | x | 6.53 | 6.42 | 6.65 | 6.65 | |
| 4 | Malaika Mihambo | Germany | 5.70 | 6.45 | x | 6.22 | 6.65 | 6.51 | 6.65 | |
| 5 | Aiga Grabuste | Latvia | 6.35 | x | 6.52 | x | 6.57 | 6.56 | 6.57 | |
| 6 | Melanie Bauschke | Germany | 6.55 | 6.37 | x | x | 6.44 | 6.50 | 6.55 | |
| 7 | Alina Rotaru | Romania | x | 6.46 | 6.55 | 6.45 | 6.33 | 6.40 | 6.55 | |
| 8 | Erica Jarder | Sweden | x | 6.39 | 6.26 | 6.33 | x | x | 6.39 | |
| 9 | Sosthene Moguenara | Germany | 6.38 | x | 6.33 | | | | 6.38 | |
| 10 | Anna Klyashtornaya | Russia | x | 6.31 | 6.09 | | | | 6.31 | |
| 11 | Volha Sudareva | Belarus | 6.25 | x | 6.29 | | | | 6.29 | |
| 12 | Nina Djordjevič | Slovenia | x | 6.19 | 6.14 | | | | 6.19 | |
