= Malaika Mihambo =

German athletics competitor

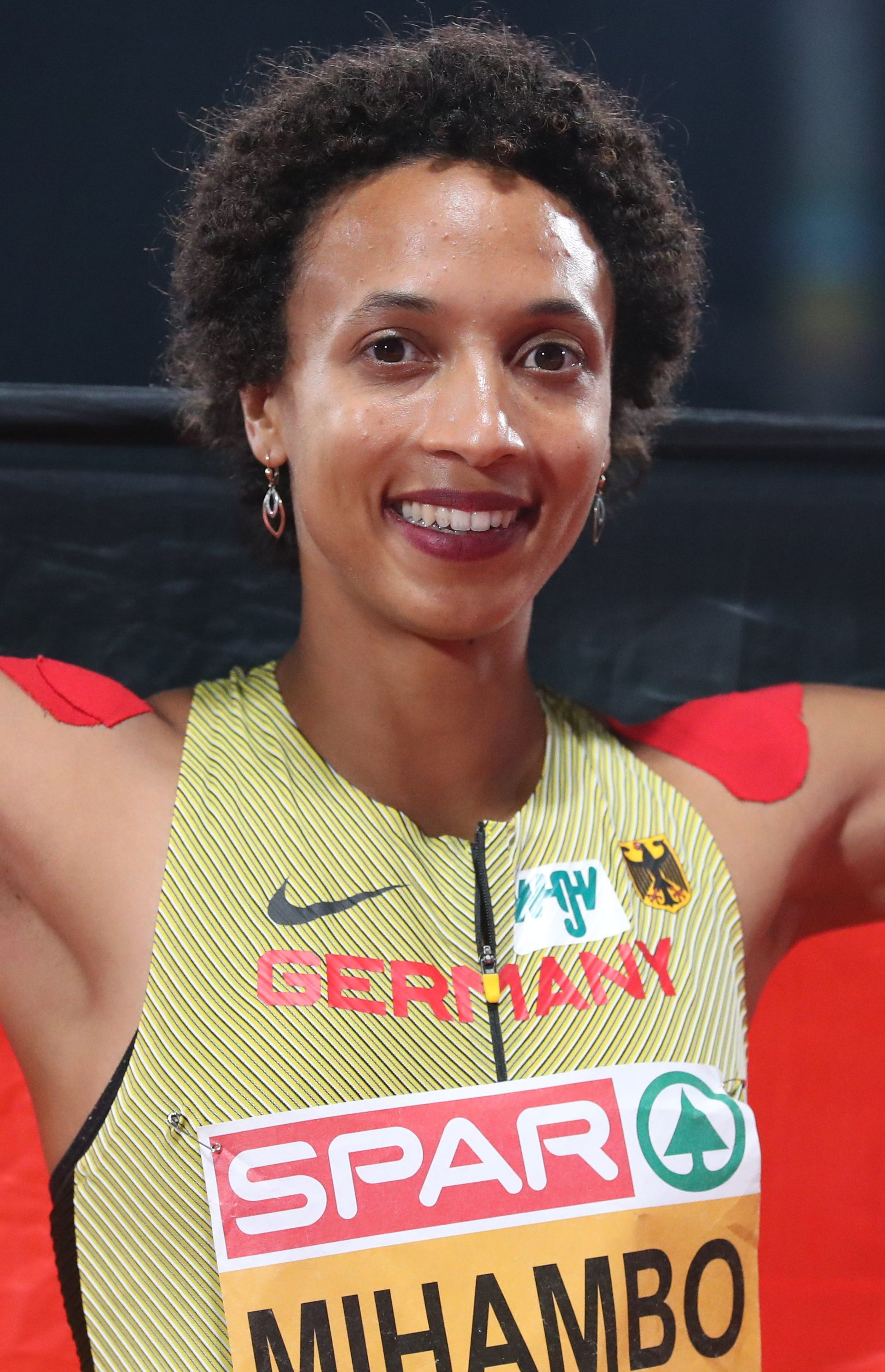
- Mihambo in 2022

Personal information
- Nationality: German
- Born: 3 February 1994 (age 32) Heidelberg, Germany
- Height: 1.71 m (5 ft 7 in)
- Weight: 58 kg (128 lb)

Sport
- Country: Germany
- Sport: Athletics
- Event: Long jump
- Coached by: Ulrich Knapp; Ralf Weber (until 2019/Doha)
Medal record
Women's athletics
Representing Germany
Olympic Games
Gold medal – first place	2020 Tokyo	Long jump
Silver medal – second place	2024 Paris	Long jump
World Championships
Gold medal – first place	2019 Doha	Long jump
Gold medal – first place	2022 Eugene	Long jump
Silver medal – second place	2025 Tokyo	Long jump
European Championships
Gold medal – first place	2018 Berlin	Long jump
Gold medal – first place	2024 Rome	Long jump
Silver medal – second place	2022 Munich	Long jump
Bronze medal – third place	2016 Amsterdam	Long jump
European Indoor Championships
Silver medal – second place	2021 Toruń	Long jump
Bronze medal – third place	2025 Apeldoorn	Long jump
European U23 Championships
Gold medal – first place	2015 Tallinn	Long jump
European Junior Championships
Gold medal – first place	2013 Rieti	Long jump

Malaika Mihambo (German: [maˈlaɪ̯ka miːˈhamboː]; born 3 February 1994) is a German athlete, 2020 Olympic champion and 2022 world champion in long jump. At the 2024 Summer Olympics, Mihambo added a silver medal in the long jump.

== Career ==
Mihambo's athletic career began around 2009, when at the age of 15 she became the German under-16 champion with the heptathlon team. She also set the best performance, with the 4 × 100 meters relay team that lasted until 2018. In the long jump she finished ninth at the 2011 World Youth Championships, then competed at the 2012 World Junior Championships and the 2013 World Championships, without reaching the final. She also won the gold medal at the 2013 European Junior Championships, and finished fourth at the 2014 European Championships.

Her first senior major event Mihambo won at the 2014 European Team Championships, setting the new championship record with a jump of 6.90 meters. In 2015, she won the gold medal at the European U23 Championships and finished sixth at the World Championships. She narrowly missed a medal at the 2016 Summer Olympics, finishing fourth, but won the bronze medal at the 2016 European Athletics Championships. Then a serious foot injury ruined her preparations for the 2017 World Championships. After difficult months with an uncertain sporting future the injury was overcome, and she finished fifth at the World Indoor Championships.

With the gold medal at the 2018 European Athletics Championships, Mihambo's star began to rise into the world's top long jump. In 2019, she had her most successful season so far with a series of jumps over 7 meters. She won the IAAF Diamond League and became world champion for the first time. In 2021 Mihambo crowned Olympic champion at the Summer Olympics in Tokyo with a jump of 7.00 meters, beating Brittney Reese and Ese Brume, both with 6.97 meters. Mihambo experienced the preliminary highlight of her career as the first European to become world champion in the long jump at least twice in a row – at the 2022 World Athletics Championships she defended her world title from 2019 with a SB of 7.12 meters and won the gold medal again. This also makes her the first long jumper ever to win at the world's most important track and field competitions four times in consecutive years. The streak came to an end during the 2022 European Championships - ailing in health but with a huge support of the home crowd, Mihambo managed a 7.03 m leap to finish silver, while Ivana Vuleta (SRB) became the new European champion with 3 cm more; Jazmin Sawyers (representing Great Britain) won the bronze medal (6.80 m).

Mihambo's personal best in the long jump is 7.30 meters, achieved on October 6 at the 2019 World Championships in Doha; since then, this distance has not been surpassed by any female jumper. The foundations of her success are essentially a kind of symbiotic interaction with physics and sports teacher Ralf Weber, who had been accompanying her as a coach since she was ten years old. Both developed their extensive skills together by supporting each other within a manageably small family environment, as well as permanently incorporating international experience into their training. The club she represents is the LG (Track and Field Community) Kurpfalz.

== Personal life ==
Her mother Petra Mihambo-Fichtner is German and her father is Tanzanian; she grew up and went to school in the municipality of Oftersheim. Mihambo studied political science at the University of Mannheim on a sports scholarship, graduating in 2016. Since April 2019, she has been studying in the postgraduate master's program in environmental sciences at the University of Hagen and is involved in a social project for children. On 15 December 2020, Mihambo was named "Germany's Sportswoman of the Year" for the third time in a row; a world best of 7.03 meters on the athletic level was followed by special recognition for her social commitment to helping children and families get into athletics on the one hand and social contacts on the other.

== Major competitive record ==
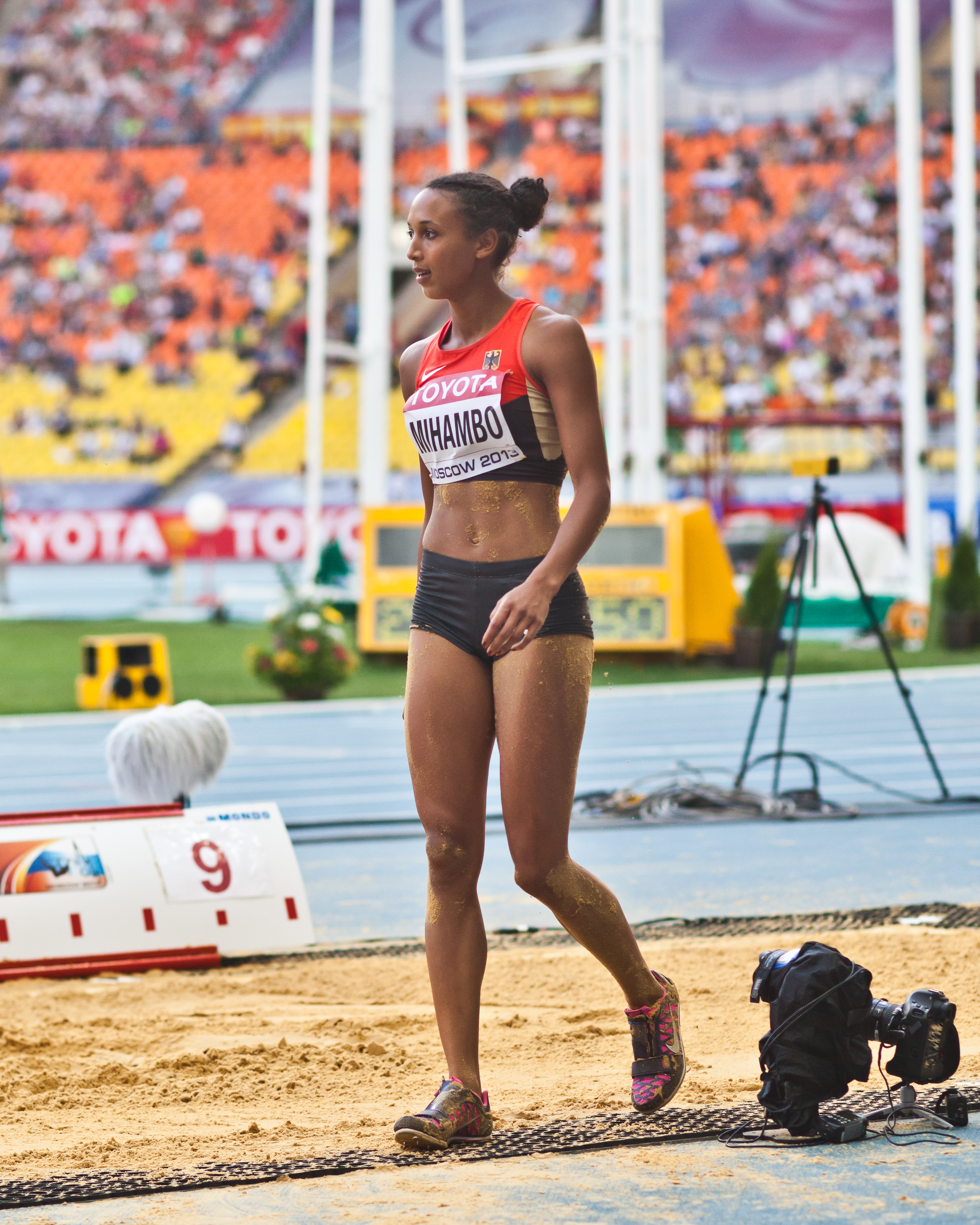
Mihambo at the 2013 World Championships in Moscow

Year	Competition	Venue	Position	Event	Notes
Representing Germany
2011	World Youth Championships	Lille, France	9th	Long jump	5.81 m
2012	World Junior Championships	Barcelona, Spain	14th (q)	Long jump	6.15 m
2013	European Junior Championships	Rieti, Italy	1st	Long jump	6.70 m
2013	World Championships	Moscow, Russia	18th (q)	Long jump	6.49 m
2014	European Team Championships	Braunschweig, Germany	1st	Long jump	6.90 m, CR
2014	European Championships	Zürich, Switzerland	4th	Long jump	6.65 m
2015	European U23 Championships	Tallinn, Estonia	1st	Long jump	6.73 m
2015	World Championships	Beijing, China	6th	Long jump	6.79 m
2016	European Championships	Amsterdam, Netherlands	3rd	Long jump	6.65 m
2016	Olympic Games	Rio de Janeiro, Brazil	4th	Long jump	6.95 m
2018	World Indoor Championships	Birmingham, United Kingdom	5th	Long jump	6.64 m
2018	European Championships	Berlin, Germany	1st	Long jump	6.75 m
2019	European Indoor Championships	Glasgow, United Kingdom	4th	Long jump	6.83 m
2019	European Team Championships	Bydgoszcz, Poland	1st	Long jump	7.11 m
2019	World Championships	Doha, Qatar	1st	Long jump	7.30 m, WL
2021	European Indoor Championships	Toruń, Poland	2nd	Long jump	6.88 m
2021	Olympic Games	Tokyo, Japan	1st	Long jump	7.00 m
2022	World Championships	Eugene, United States	1st	Long jump	7.12 m
2022	European Championships	Munich, Germany	2nd	Long jump	7.03 m
2023	European Indoor Championships	Istanbul, Turkey	4th	Long jump	6.83 m
2024	European Championships	Rome, Italy	1st	Long jump	7.22 m, WL
2024	Olympic Games	Paris, France	2nd	Long jump	6.98 m
2025	European Indoor Championships	Apeldoorn, Netherlands	3rd	Long jump	6.88 m
2025	World Championships	Tokyo, Japan	2nd	Long jump	6.99 m
2026	European Championships	Birmingham, United Kingdom	5th	Long jump	6.94 m (w)

Awards
Preceded by Angelique Kerber	German Sportswoman of the Year; 2019	Succeeded by Incumbent
