= 2013 World Championships in Athletics – Women's long jump =

Women's long jump at the 2013 World Championships
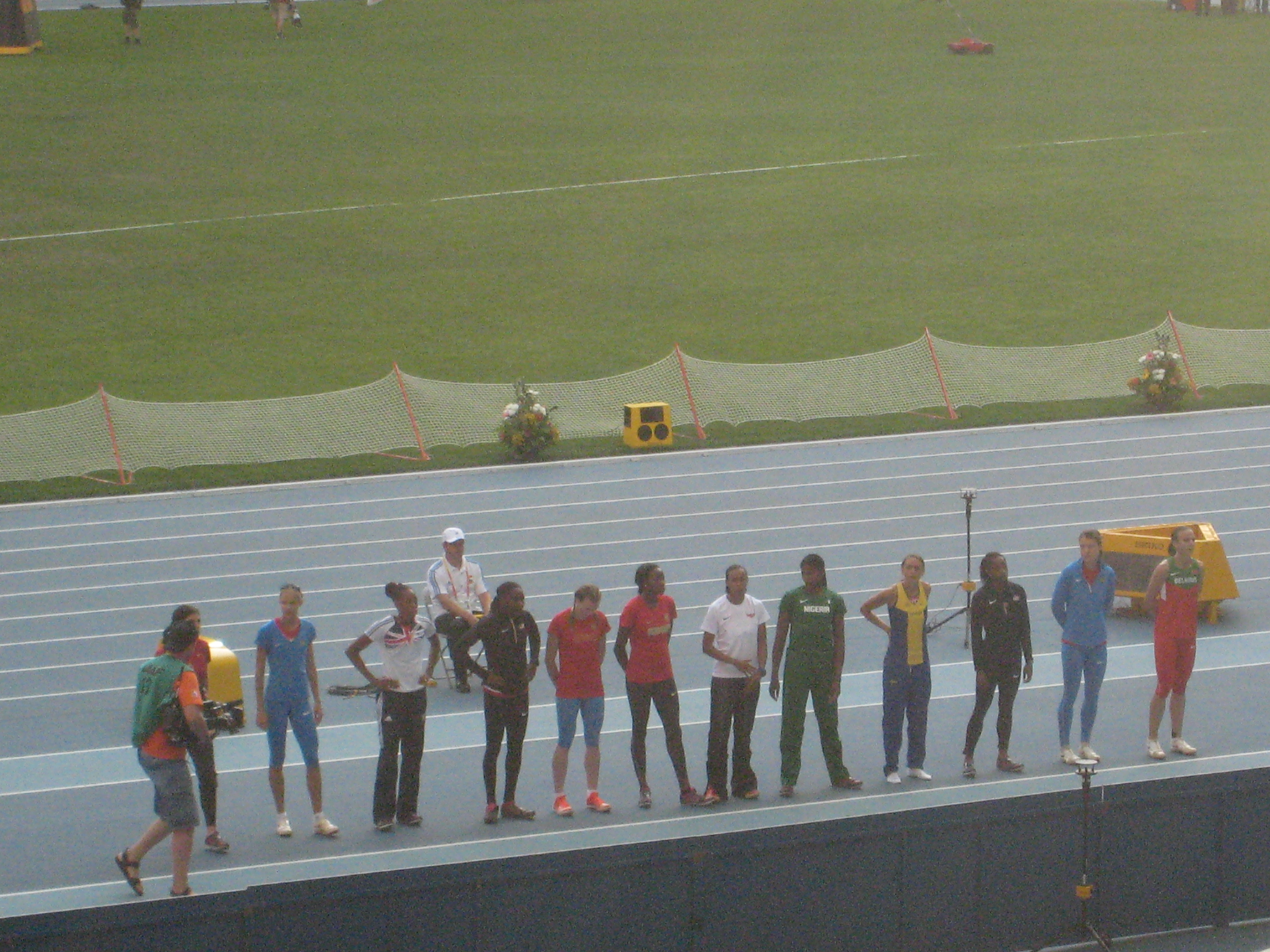
- Venue: Luzhniki Stadium
- Dates: 10 August 2013 (qualification); 11 August 2013 (final)
- Competitors: 31 from 21 nations
- Winning distance: 7.01 m (22 ft 11 3/4 in)

Medalists
gold medal	Brittney Reese; United States
silver medal	Blessing Okagbare; Nigeria
bronze medal	Ivana Španović; Serbia

Official Video

The women's long jump at the 2013 World Championships in Athletics was held at the Luzhniki Stadium on 10–11 August.

== Summary ==
Two time defending champion, current Olympic champion and world leading Brittney Reese squeaked through qualifying in the last qualifying position. Her 6.57 tied with teammate Funmi Jimoh so she won her position by her second best jump (also 6.57 with Jimoh not having a second legal jump). Shara Proctor led three automatic qualifiers.

In the final, her first round 6.50 was more of the same, while Blessing Okagbare jumped 6.89 for the lead. Reese's 7.01 to start the second round changed the tune, moving the marker beyond any else's range. Volha Sudarava's 6.82 put her into third place. In the fifth round, Ivana Španović's Serbian national record of 6.82 equaled Sudarava and Okagbare improved her best to 6.99, just 2 cm short of Reese. Reese followed with a meaningless 6.95. Okagbare's final attempt was 6.96, again close but too short to take the win. Left with a tie for third, officials again had to look to the second best attempt for the tiebreaker. Španović jumped 6.70 in the first round to get the bronze over Sudarava's 6.66, also in the first round.

== Records ==
Prior to the competition, the established records were as follows.

World record	Galina Chistyakova (URS)	7.52	Leningrad, Soviet Union	11 June 1988
Championship record	Jackie Joyner-Kersee (USA)	7.36	Rome, Italy	3 September 1987
World leading	Brittney Reese (USA)	7.25	Doha, Qatar	10 May 2013
African record	Chioma Ajunwa (NGR)	7.12	Atlanta, GA, United States	2 August 1996
Asian record	Yao Weili (CHN)	7.01	Jinan, People's Republic of China	5 June 1993
North, Central American and Caribbean record	Jackie Joyner-Kersee (USA)	7.49	New York City, United States	22 May 1994
North, Central American and Caribbean record	Jackie Joyner-Kersee (USA)	7.49	Sestriere, Italy	31 July 1994
South American record	Maurren Higa Maggi (BRA)	7.26A	Bogotá, Colombia	26 June 1999
European record	Galina Chistyakova (URS)	7.52	Leningrad, Soviet Union	11 June 1988
Oceanian record	Bronwyn Thompson (AUS)	7.00	Melbourne, Australia	7 March 2002

== Qualification standards ==
A result	B result
6.75	6.65

== Schedule ==
Date	Time	Round
10 August 2013	19:20	Qualification
11 August 2013	19:00	Final

All times are local times (UTC+4)

== Results ==
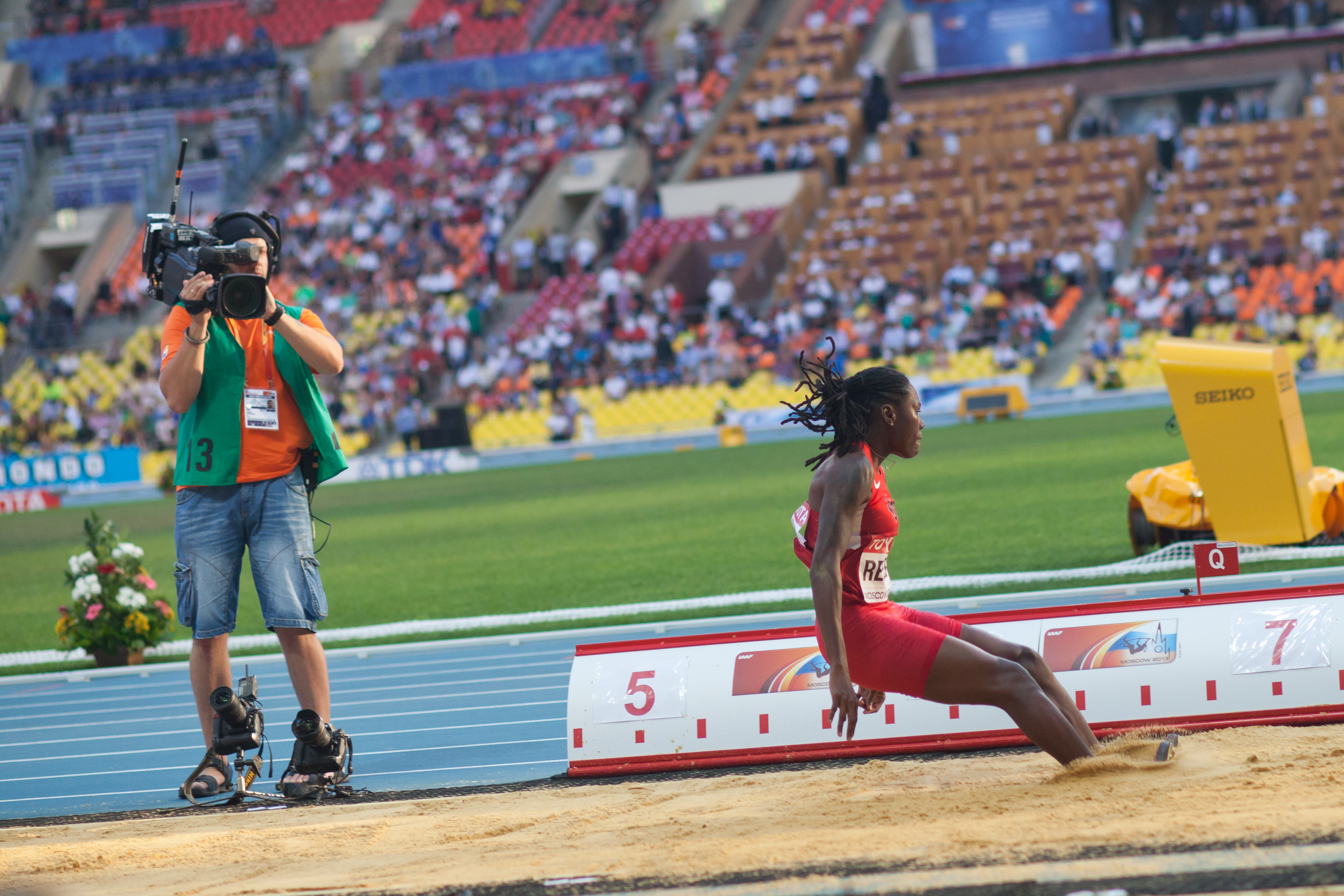
Brittney Reese

KEY:	Q	Qualified	q	12 best performers	NR	National record	PB	Personal best	SB	Seasonal best

=== Qualification ===
Qualification: 6.75 m (Q) and at least 12 best (q) advanced to the final.

Rank	Group	Name	Nationality	No. 1	No. 2	No. 3	Mark	Notes
1	A	Shara Proctor	Great Britain & N.I.	6.85	–	–	6.85	Q
2	A	Blessing Okagbare	Nigeria	6.83	–	–	6.83	Q
3	A	Tori Polk	United States	6.62	6.75		6.75	Q, PB
4	B	Volha Sudarava	Belarus	6.38	6.71	x	6.71	q
5	B	Darya Klishina	Russia	6.70	6.70	x	6.70	q
6	A	Yelena Sokolova	Russia	x	6.70	x	6.70	q
7	A	Ivana Španović	Serbia	6.58	6.57	6.63	6.63	q
8	B	Sosthene Moguenara	Germany	6.63	x	x	6.63	q
9	A	Erica Jarder	Sweden	6.57	6.59	6.58	6.59	q
10	A	Olga Kucherenko	Russia	6.59	x	x	6.59	q
11	B	Janay DeLoach Soukup	United States	x	6.04	6.58	6.58	q
12	A	Brittney Reese	United States	6.57	6.57	6.42	6.57	q
13	B	Funmi Jimoh	United States	x	6.57	x	6.57	
14	B	Lyudmila Kolchanova	Russia	6.53	x	x	6.53	
15	B	Anna Kornuta	Ukraine	6.44	6.53	x	6.53	
16	A	Lauma Grīva	Latvia	6.46	6.50	6.36	6.50	
17	A	Lena Malkus	Germany	6.26	6.49	6.41	6.49	
18	B	Malaika Mihambo	Germany	3.63	5.55	6.49	6.49	
19	A	Jana Velďáková	Slovakia	6.43	6.48	6.36	6.48	
20	B	Christabel Nettey	Canada	6.25	6.36	6.47	6.47	
21	A	Chantel Malone	British Virgin Islands	6.20	6.40	6.20	6.40	
22	B	Éloyse Lesueur	France	6.25	x	6.39	6.39	
23	B	Arantxa King	Bermuda	x	6.36	x	6.36	
24	B	Bianca Stuart	Bahamas	x	6.30	6.35	6.35	
25	A	Maryna Bekh	Ukraine	6.29	6.31	6.30	6.31	
26	A	Jana Korešová	Czech Republic	6.10	6.10	6.18	6.18	
27	A	Lynique Prinsloo	South Africa	6.03	x	6.17	6.17	
28	B	Dariya Derkach	Italy	x	6.16	x	6.16	
29	B	Macarena Reyes	Chile	x	5.93	x	5.93	
	B	Lorraine Ugen	Great Britain & N.I.	x	x	x	NM	
	B	Francine Simpson	Jamaica	x	x	x	NM	

=== Final ===
The final was held on 11 August.

Rank	Name	Nationality	No. 1	No. 2	No. 3	No. 4	No. 5	No. 6	Mark	Notes
1st place, gold medalist(s)	Brittney Reese	United States	6.50	7.01	x	x	6.95	x	7.01	
2nd place, silver medalist(s)	Blessing Okagbare	Nigeria	6.89	6.58	6.68	6.80	6.99	6.96	6.99	
3rd place, bronze medalist(s)	Ivana Španović	Serbia	6.70	6.64	6.67	x	6.82	6.61	6.82	NR
4	Volha Sudarava	Belarus	6.66	6.82	6.49	6.45	6.64	6.50	6.82	SB
5	Olga Kucherenko	Russia	6.56	6.67	6.67	6.81	6.68	6.72	6.81	
6	Shara Proctor	Great Britain & N.I.	x	6.79	6.60	6.56	6.66	6.69	6.79	
7	Darya Klishina	Russia	x	6.76	x	6.70	6.69	6.70	6.76	
8	Tori Polk	United States	6.65	6.56	6.39	6.73	6.41	x	6.73	
9	Yelena Sokolova	Russia	x	6.65	x				6.65	
10	Erica Jarder	Sweden	6.47	x	x				6.47	
11	Janay DeLoach Soukup	United States	x	6.43	6.44				6.44	
12	Sosthene Moguenara	Germany	6.42	x	6.15				6.42	
