= Kelly Proper =

Irish athlete

Personal information
- Born: 1 May 1988 (age 38)

Sport
- Sport: Athletics
- Event(s): 200 metres, long jump

Kelly Proper (born 1 May 1988) is an Irish long jumper turned sprinter. She competed in the 200 metres at the 2015 World Championships in Beijing.

== International competitions ==
Year	Competition	Venue	Position	Event	Notes
Representing Ireland
2005	World Youth Championships	Marrakesh, Morocco	24th (q)	Long jump	5.69 m
2005	European Youth Olympic Festival	Lignano Sabbiadoro, Italy	6th	Long jump	6.01 m
2006	World Junior Championships	Beijing, China	19th (q)	Long jump	5.91 m
2007	European Junior Championships	Hengelo, Netherlands	11th	Long jump	5.79 m
2009	European Indoor Championships	Paris, France	7th	Long jump	6.37 m
2009	European U23 Championships	Kaunas, Lithuania	6th	Long jump	6.58 m (w)
2010	World Indoor Championships	Doha, Qatar	16th (q)	Long jump	6.29 m
2010	European Championships	Barcelona, Spain	–	Long jump	NM
2011	European Indoor Championships	Paris, France	13th (q)	Long jump	6.45 m
2014	European Championships	Zurich, Switzerland	10th (sf)	200 m	23.15
2014	European Championships	Zurich, Switzerland	10th (h)	4 × 100 m relay	43.84
2015	World Championships	Beijing, China	32nd (h)	200 m	23.28

== Personal bests ==
Outdoor

- 200 metres – 23.15 (+0.3 m/s, Zurich 2014)
- 800 metres – 2:21.12 (Ribeira Brava 2013)
- 100 metres hurdles – 14.80 (0.0 m/s, Florence 2013)
- High jump – 1.66 (Florence 2013)
- Long jump – 6.60 (+1.0 m/s, Brussels 2010)
- Shot put – 10.57 (Ribeira Brava 2013)
- Javelin throw – 34.11 (Florence 2013)
- Heptathlon – 5442 (Florence 2013)

Indoor

- 60 metres – 7.38 (Athlone 2015)
- 200 metres – 23.27 (Athlone 2015)
- Long jump – 6.62 (Vienna 2010)
