= Erica Jarder =

Swedish long jumper

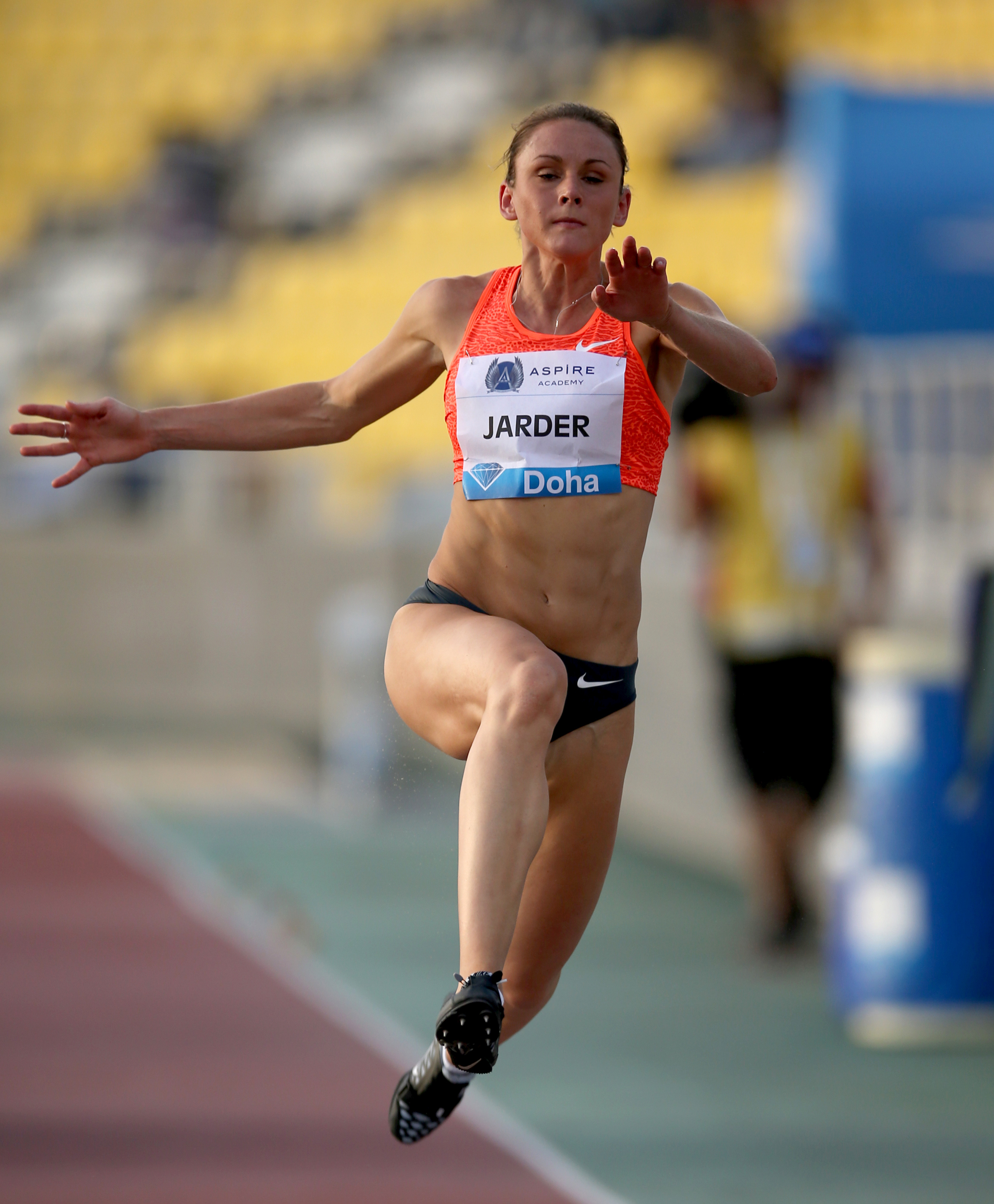
- Erica Jarder in 2015

Personal information
- Born: 2 April 1986 (age 40) Täby, Sweden

Sport
- Sport: Athletics
- Event: Long jump

Achievements and titles
- Personal best(s): Outdoor: 6.70 m (Beijing 2015); Indoor: 6.71 m (Gothenburg 2013)
Medal record
Representing Sweden
European Indoors Championships
Bronze medal – third place	2013 Gothenburg	Long jump

Erica May-Lynn Jarder (born 2 April 1986) is a Swedish athlete specializing in long jump. Jarder won the bronze medal in the long jump at the European Indoor Championships in Gothenburg on 2 March 2013.

== Competition record ==
Year	Competition	Venue	Position	Event	Notes
Representing Sweden
2007	European U23 Championships	Debrecen, Hungary	18th (q)	Long jump	5.97 m
2011	Universiade	Shenzhen, China	13th (q)	Long jump	6.14 m
2013	European Indoor Championships	Gothenburg, Sweden	3rd	Long jump	6.71 m
2013	World Championships	Moscow, Russia	10th	Long jump	6.47 m
2014	World Indoor Championships	Sopot, Poland	8th	Long jump	6.36 m
2014	European Championships	Zürich, Switzerland	8th	Long jump	6.39 m
2015	European Indoor Championships	Prague, Czech Republic	11th (q)	Long jump	6.49 m
2015	World Championships	Beijing, China	12th	Long jump	6.48 m
2016	European Championships	Amsterdam, Netherlands	19th (q)	Long jump	6.33 m (w)
