= Volha Sudarava =

Belarusian long jumper

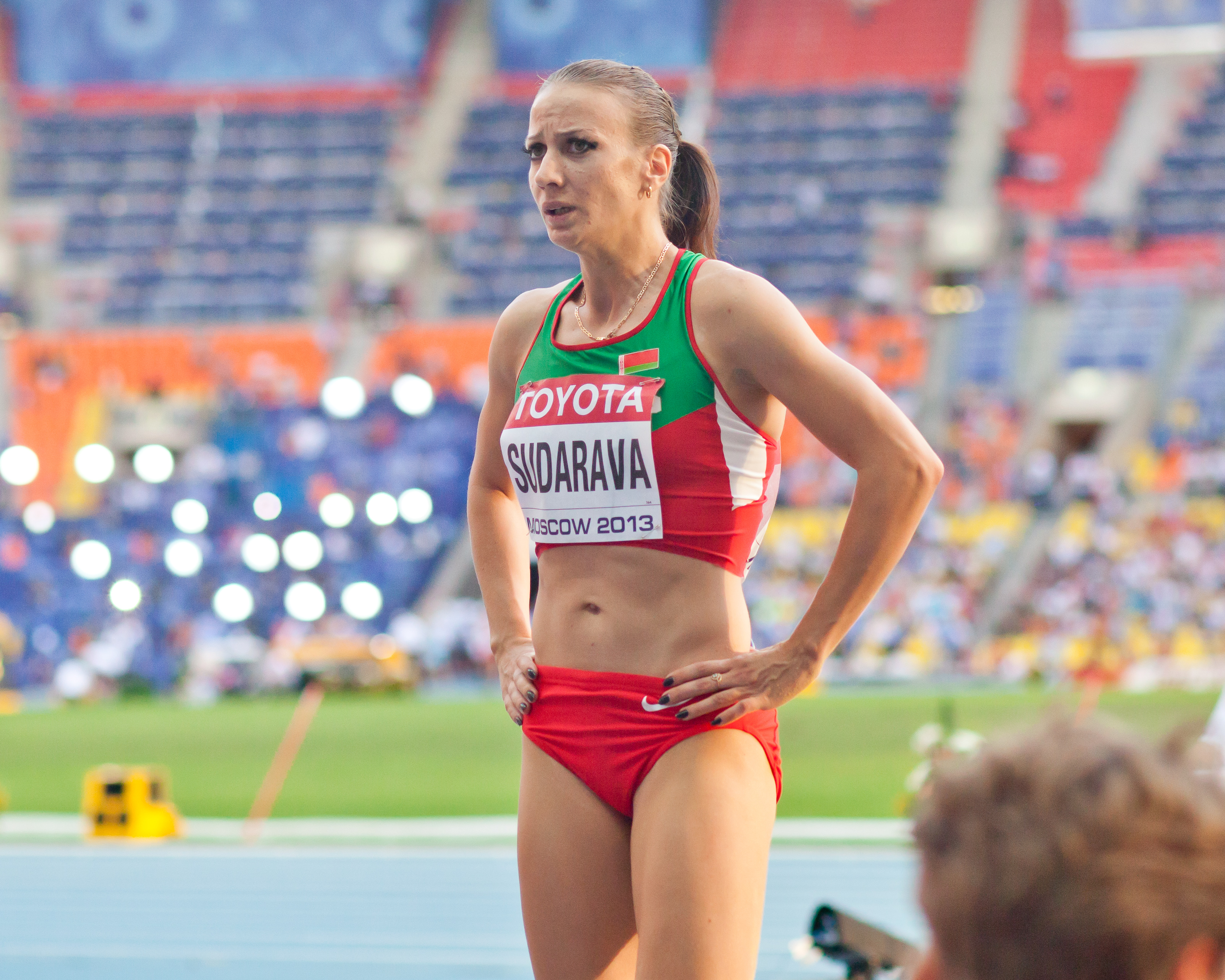
- Sudarava at the 2013 World Championships in Athletics in Moscow.

Personal information
- Born: Volha Alyaksandrauna Siarheyenka; 22 February 1984 (age 42) Gomel, Belarusian SSR, Soviet Union
- Height: 1.77 m (5 ft 9 1/2 in)
- Weight: 62 kg (137 lb)

Sport
- Country: Belarus
- Sport: Track and field
- Event: Long jump
Medal record
Representing Belarus
European Championships
Silver medal – second place	2012 Helsinki	Long jump

Volha Alyaksandrauna Sudarava, née Siarheyenka, (Belarusian: Вольга Аляксандраўна Сударава, née Сяргеенка, born 22 June 1984) is a Belarusian athlete. She won the silver medal in long jump at the 2012 European Championships in Helsinki, with a result of 6.74 metres.

Her personal bests in the event are 6.86 metres outdoors (+0.6 m/s, Cheboksary 2015) and 6.73 metres indoors (Gomel 2012).

== Competition record ==
Year	Competition	Venue	Position	Event	Notes
Representing Belarus
2007	Universiade	Bangkok, Thailand	11th	Long jump	6.27 m
2008	Olympic Games	Beijing, China	32nd (q)	Long jump	6.25 m
2012	European Championships	Helsinki, Finland	2nd	Long jump	6.74 m
2012	Olympic Games	London, United Kingdom	14th (q)	Long jump	6.38 m
2013	European Indoor Championships	Gothenburg, Sweden	10th (q)	Long jump	6.43 m
2013	World Championships	Moscow, Russia	4th	Long jump	6.82 m
2014	World Indoor Championships	Sopot, Poland	9th (q)	Long jump	6.47 m
2014	European Championships	Zurich, Switzerland	11th	Long jump	6.29 m
2015	World Championships	Beijing, China	13th (q)	Long jump	6.65 m
2016	Olympic Games	Rio de Janeiro, Brazil	25th (q)	Long jump	6.29 m
