= Melanie Bauschke =

German long jumper (born 1988)

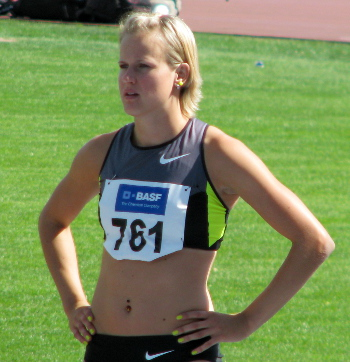
Bauschke (Mannheim, 2012)

Melanie Bauschke (born 14 July 1988 in Berlin) is a German athlete, specializing in the long jump. A versatile sprinter/hurdler, she has also scored over 5,000 points in the heptathlon. She was the 2009 European under 23 champion in the long jump. She picked up a silver medal in the high jump at the same competition.

== Competition record ==
Year	Competition	Venue	Position	Event	Notes
Representing Germany
2006	World Junior Championships	Beijing, China	13th (q)	Long jump	6.05 m (wind: -0.7 m/s)
2009	European Indoor Championships	Turin, Italy	11th (q)	Long jump	6.39 m
2009	European U23 Championships	Kaunas, Lithuania	2nd	High jump	1.89 m
2009	European U23 Championships	Kaunas, Lithuania	1st	Long jump	6.83 m
2009	World Championships	Berlin, Germany	23rd (q)	Long jump	6.32 m
2011	Universiade	Shenzhen, China	12th (h)	4 × 100 m relay	46.80 m
2011	Universiade	Shenzhen, China	16th (q)	High jump	1.75 m
2011	Universiade	Shenzhen, China	3rd	Long jump	6.51 m
2012	European Championships	Helsinki, Finland	7th	Long jump	6.50 m
2013	European Indoor Championships	Gothenburg, Sweden	14th (q)	Long jump	6.19 m
2014	European Championships	Zürich, Switzerland	6th	Long jump	6.55 m
2015	European Indoor Championships	Prague, Czech Republic	6th	Long jump	6.59 m

== Personal bests ==
Outdoor

- High jump – 1.90 m (Berlin 2009)
- Long jump – 6.83 m (-0.3 m/s) (Kaunas 2009)

Indoor

- 60 metres – 7.85 (Potsdam 2010)
- High jump – 1.89 m (Potsdam 2010)
- Long jump – 6.68 m (Karlsruhe 2013)
