= 2006 World Junior Championships in Athletics – Women's long jump =

The women's long jump event at the 2006 World Junior Championships in Athletics was held in Beijing, China, at Chaoyang Sports Centre on 17 and 19 August.

== Medalists ==
Gold	Rhonda Watkins; Trinidad and Tobago
Silver	Anika Leipold; Germany
Bronze	Zhang Yuan; China

== Results ==
=== Final ===
19 August

Rank	Name	Nationality	Attempts						Result	Notes
Rank	Name	Nationality	1	2	3	4	5	6	Result	Notes
1st place, gold medalist(s)	Rhonda Watkins	Trinidad and Tobago	6.01 (w: +0.4 m/s)	6.24 (w: 0.0 m/s)	6.46 (w: -0.3 m/s)	6.03 (w: +0.1 m/s)	6.20 (w: +0.3 m/s)	6.26 (w: +0.2 m/s)	6.46 (w: -0.3 m/s)	
2nd place, silver medalist(s)	Anika Leipold	Germany	5.92 (w: 0.0 m/s)	6.10 (w: NWI)	6.26 (w: +0.1 m/s)	6.14 (w: +0.2 m/s)	6.31 (w: +0.2 m/s)	6.42 (w: -0.1 m/s)	6.42 (w: -0.1 m/s)	
3rd place, bronze medalist(s)	Zhang Yuan	China	6.38 (w: 0.0 m/s)	x	6.41 (w: +0.1 m/s)	6.35 (w: 0.0 m/s)	6.25 (w: 0.0 m/s)	x	6.41 (w: +0.1 m/s)	
4	Charlène Quernel	France	x	6.30 (w: +0.1 m/s)	6.37 (w: +0.3 m/s)	6.29 (w: +0.1 m/s)	6.31 (w: 0.0 m/s)	6.25 (w: +0.2 m/s)	6.37 (w: +0.3 m/s)	
5	Jessica Penney	New Zealand	x	5.80 (w: -0.1 m/s)	6.26 (w: +0.2 m/s)	5.68 (w: +0.2 m/s)	6.16 (w: -0.1 m/s)	6.37 (w: +0.2 m/s)	6.37 (w: +0.2 m/s)	
6	Cornelia Deiac	Romania	6.09 (w: -0.1 m/s)	6.25 (w: +0.1 m/s)	6.30 (w: +0.2 m/s)	6.04 (w: +0.1 m/s)	6.33 (w: -0.3 m/s)	x	6.33 (w: -0.3 m/s)	
7	Ivana Španović	Serbia	6.14 (w: +0.1 m/s)	6.21 (w: +0.2 m/s)	6.09 (w: +0.1 m/s)	6.20 (w: +0.3 m/s)	x	6.23 (w: 0.0 m/s)	6.23 (w: 0.0 m/s)	
8	Noora Pesola	Finland	6.17 (w: +0.3 m/s)	6.02 (w: +0.3 m/s)	6.09 (w: +0.3 m/s)	6.06 (w: +0.2 m/s)	6.10 (w: +0.1 m/s)	x	6.17 (w: +0.3 m/s)	
9	Nina Kokot	Slovenia	5.82 (w: +0.3 m/s)	6.09 (w: +0.2 m/s)	5.78 (w: -0.3 m/s)				6.09 (w: +0.2 m/s)	
10	Arantxa King	Bermuda	5.57 (w: +0.1 m/s)	x	5.47 (w: -0.1 m/s)				5.57 (w: +0.1 m/s)	
	Manuela Galtier	France	x	x	x				NM	
	Yuliya Pidluzhnaya	Russia	-	-	-				NM	

=== Qualifications ===
17 August

==== Group A ====
Rank	Name	Nationality	Attempts			Result	Notes
Rank	Name	Nationality	1	2	3	Result	Notes
1	Cornelia Deiac	Romania	5.97 (w: -0.6 m/s)	6.25 (w: +0.8 m/s)	-	6.25 (w: +0.8 m/s)	Q
2	Manuela Galtier	France	6.04 (w: +1.1 m/s)	6.03 (w: -0.1 m/s)	6.23 (w: +0.3 m/s)	6.23 (w: +0.3 m/s)	Q
3	Anika Leipold	Germany	6.13 (w: -0.7 m/s)	6.18 (w: +0.1 m/s)	6.14 (w: +0.4 m/s)	6.18 (w: +0.1 m/s)	q
4	Yuliya Pidluzhnaya	Russia	6.18 (w: -0.3 m/s)	6.10 (w: +0.6 m/s)	6.10 (w: +0.5 m/s)	6.18 (w: -0.3 m/s)	q
5	Arantxa King	Bermuda	6.11 (w: +0.5 m/s)	5.44 (w: -0.6 m/s)	6.14 (w: +0.7 m/s)	6.14 (w: +0.7 m/s)	q
6	Blessing Okagbare	Nigeria	5.94 (w: +0.9 m/s)	5.97 (w: +0.7 m/s)	5.69 (w: -1.1 m/s)	5.97 (w: +0.7 m/s)	
7	Oda Utsi Onstad	Norway	5.73 (w: -0.7 m/s)	5.92 (w: -0.3 m/s)	5.94 (w: +0.4 m/s)	5.94 (w: +0.4 m/s)	
8	Serena Amato	Italy	x	4.18 (w: -0.1 m/s)	5.85 (w: +0.3 m/s)	5.85 (w: +0.3 m/s)	
9	Natasha Harvey	United States	5.50 (w: 0.0 m/s)	5.83 (w: -0.7 m/s)	x	5.83 (w: -0.7 m/s)	
10	Beate Schrott	Austria	x	x	5.74 (w: -0.8 m/s)	5.74 (w: -0.8 m/s)	
11	Dóra Végvári	Hungary	5.65 (w: +1.1 m/s)	5.66 (w: 0.0 m/s)	5.70 (w: +0.3 m/s)	5.70 (w: +0.3 m/s)	
12	Kauiza Venâncio	Brazil	5.61 (w: -1.1 m/s)	5.69 (w: +0.4 m/s)	5.67 (w: +0.2 m/s)	5.69 (w: +0.4 m/s)	
13	Rima Taha	Jordan	5.40 (w: -0.1 m/s)	5.52 (w: +0.3 m/s)	5.49 (w: +0.7 m/s)	5.52 (w: +0.3 m/s)	
14	Aleksandra Kotlyarova	Uzbekistan	x	x	5.39 (w: -0.2 m/s)	5.39 (w: -0.2 m/s)	
	Zhang Lan	China	x	x	-	NM	

==== Group B ====
Rank	Name	Nationality	Attempts			Result	Notes
Rank	Name	Nationality	1	2	3	Result	Notes
1	Rhonda Watkins	Trinidad and Tobago	6.04 (w: -0.2 m/s)	6.47 (w: +0.5 m/s)	-	6.47 (w: +0.5 m/s)	Q
2	Nina Kokot	Slovenia	6.29 (w: +1.1 m/s)	-	-	6.29 (w: +1.1 m/s)	Q
3	Jessica Penney	New Zealand	6.26 (w: -0.7 m/s)	-	-	6.26 (w: -0.7 m/s)	Q
4	Ivana Španović	Serbia	6.24 (w: +0.2 m/s)	-	-	6.24 (w: +0.2 m/s)	Q
5	Zhang Yuan	China	x	6.23 (w: -0.4 m/s)	-	6.23 (w: -0.4 m/s)	Q
6	Charlène Quernel	France	6.21 (w: -0.7 m/s)	-	-	6.21 (w: -0.7 m/s)	Q
7	Noora Pesola	Finland	6.14 (w: -0.9 m/s)	x	x	6.14 (w: -0.9 m/s)	q
8	Melanie Bauschke	Germany	6.05 (w: -0.7 m/s)	x	5.98 (w: +0.2 m/s)	6.05 (w: -0.7 m/s)	
9	Bianca Stuart	Bahamas	x	6.05 (w: -0.2 m/s)	x	6.05 (w: -0.2 m/s)	
10	Amy Harris	United Kingdom	6.00 (w: +0.1 m/s)	5.95 (w: +0.5 m/s)	6.02 (w: +0.4 m/s)	6.02 (w: +0.4 m/s)	
11	Shara Proctor	Anguilla	5.90 (w: -0.9 m/s)	5.89 (w: +0.5 m/s)	6.01 (w: 0.0 m/s)	6.01 (w: 0.0 m/s)	
12	Kelly Proper	Ireland	x	x	5.91 (w: +0.3 m/s)	5.91 (w: +0.3 m/s)	
13	Cristina Sandu	Romania	5.79 (w: +0.5 m/s)	5.74 (w: +0.1 m/s)	5.88 (w: -0.1 m/s)	5.88 (w: -0.1 m/s)	
14	Namatirai Maugara	Zimbabwe	5.31 (w: -0.5 m/s)	5.43 (w: +0.9 m/s)	4.66 (w: +0.1 m/s)	5.43 (w: +0.9 m/s)	
	Sarah Matthew	United States	x	x	x	NM	

== Participation ==
According to an unofficial count, 30 athletes from 25 countries participated in the event.

- Anguilla (1)
- Austria (1)
- Bahamas (1)
- Bermuda (1)
- Brazil (1)
- China (2)
- Finland (1)
- France (2)
- Germany (2)
- Hungary (1)
- Ireland (1)
- Italy (1)
- Jordan (1)
- New Zealand (1)
- Nigeria (1)
- Norway (1)
- Romania (2)
- Russia (1)
- Serbia (1)
- Slovenia (1)
- Trinidad and Tobago (1)
- United Kingdom (1)
- United States (2)
- Uzbekistan (1)
- Zimbabwe (1)
