= 2013 European Athletics Indoor Championships – Women's long jump =

The Women's long jump event at the 2013 European Athletics Indoor Championships was held on March 1, 2013 at 10:05 (qualification) and March 2, 16:00 (final) local time.

== Records ==
Standing records prior to the 2013 European Athletics Indoor Championships
World record	Heike Drechsler (GDR)	7.37	Vienna, Austria	13 February 1988
European record	Heike Drechsler (GDR)	7.37	Vienna, Austria	13 February 1988
Championship record	Heike Drechsler (GDR)	7.30	Budapest, Hungary	5 March 1988
World Leading	Olga Kucherenko (RUS)	7.00	Krasnodar, Russia	20 January 2013
European Leading	Olga Kucherenko (RUS)	7.00	Krasnodar, Russia	20 January 2013

== Results ==
=== Qualification ===
Qualification: Qualification Performance 6.65 (Q) or at least 8 best performers advanced to the final.

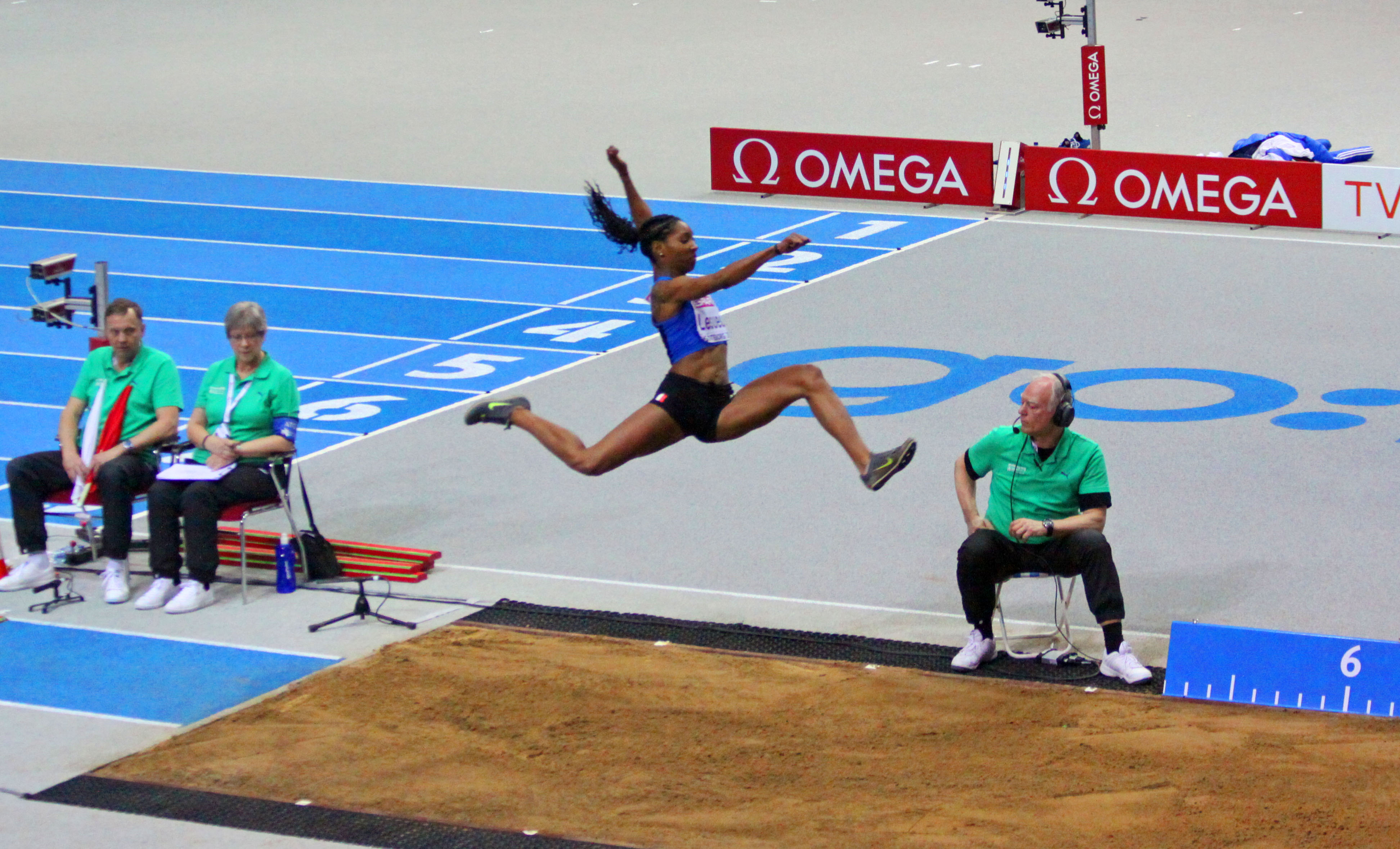
Éloyse Lesueur of France finished second in the event.

Rank	Athlete	Nationality	#1	#2	#3	Result	Note
1	Darya Klishina	Russia	6.62	6.58	–	6.62	q
2	Erica Jarder	Sweden	x	6.61	–	6.61	q, PB
2	Shara Proctor	Great Britain	6.61	–	–	6.61	q
4	Éloyse Lesueur	France	6.60	–	–	6.60	q
5	Ivana Španović	Serbia	6.59	–	–	6.59	q
6	Olga Kucherenko	Russia	6.48	6.42	6.54	6.54	q
7	Anastasiya Mokhnyuk	Ukraine	6.47	6.19	6.52	6.52	q
8	Cornelia Deiac	Romania	x	6.46	6.52	6.52	q
9	Svetlana Denyaeva	Russia	5.74	6.44	6.50	6.50	
10	Volha Sudarava	Belarus	6.01	6.28	6.43	6.43	
11	Alina Rotaru	Romania	6.30	6.39	6.32	6.39	
12	Renáta Medgyesová	Slovakia	6.35	6.17	6.21	6.35	SB
13	Lauma Griva	Latvia	6.26	6.18	6.34	6.34	
14	Melanie Bauschke	Germany	6.16	6.19	6.19	6.19	
15	Jana Veldáková	Slovakia	x	6.17	x	6.17	
16	Stefanie Voss	Germany	x	6.12	x	6.12	
17	Florentina Marincu	Romania	x	5.98	x	5.98	
18	Sevim Sinmez Serbest	Turkey	x	5.97	5.81	5.97	
19	Giulia Liboá	Italy	x	x	5.94	5.94	

=== Final ===
The final was held at 16:00.

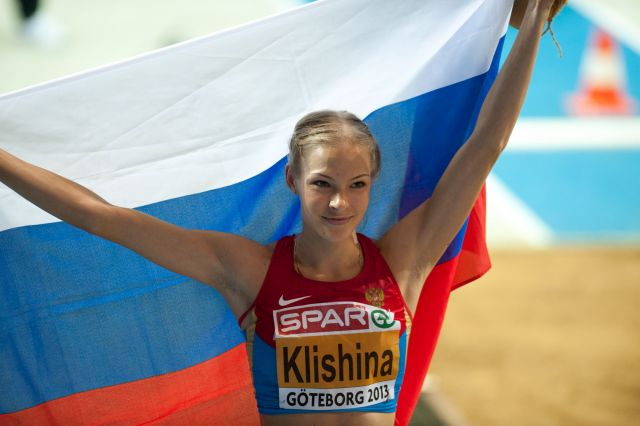
Gold medalist, Darya Klishina

Rank	Athlete	Nationality	#1	#2	#3	#4	#5	#6	Result	Notes
1st place, gold medalist(s)	Darya Klishina	Russia	7.01	6.83	x	6.57	6.71	x	7.01	WL
2nd place, silver medalist(s)	Éloyse Lesueur	France	6.85	x	x	6.87	6.90	x	6.90	NR
3rd place, bronze medalist(s)	Erica Jarder	Sweden	x	6.55	x	6.56	x	6.71	6.71	PB
4	Shara Proctor	Great Britain	6.68	6.54	x	6.69	6.60	x	6.69	
5	Ivana Španović	Serbia	x	6.48	6.62	6.38	6.44	6.68	6.68	
6	Olga Kucherenko	Russia	6.31	6.59	6.62	x	6.44	x	6.62	
7	Cornelia Deiac	Romania	6.35	6.48	6.52	6.38	6.48	6.48	6.52	
8	Anastasiya Mokhnyuk	Ukraine	x	x	x	6.19	6.43	6.46	6.46	
