= Jana Velďáková =

Slovak long jumper

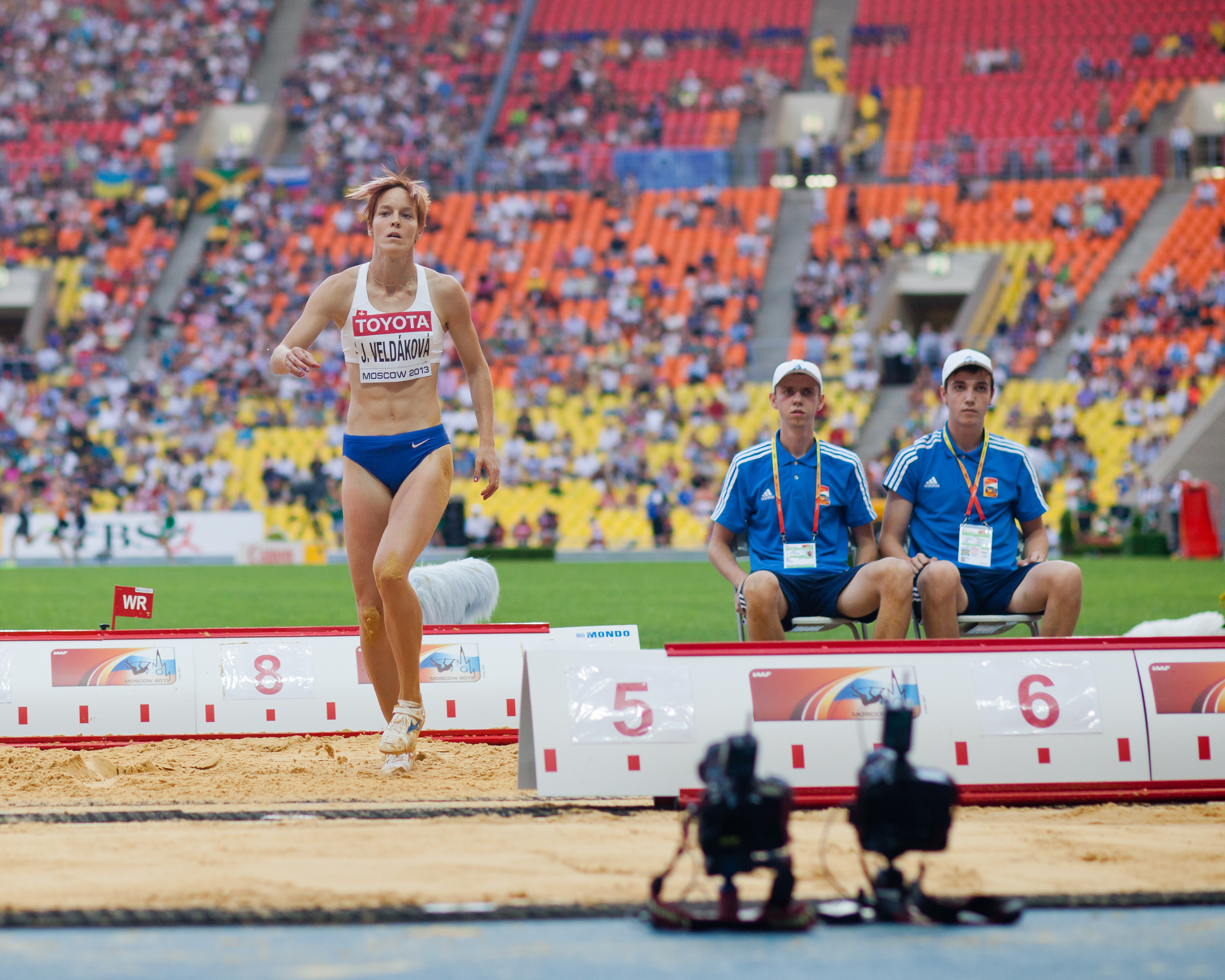
- Velďáková in Moscow 2013

Personal information
- Born: 3 June 1981 (age 45) Rožňava, Czechoslovakia
- Height: 1.77 m (5 ft 9 1/2 in)
- Weight: 60 kg (132 lb)

Sport
- Country: Slovakia
- Sport: Athletics
- Event: Long jump
- Coached by: Radoslav Dubovský

Achievements and titles
- Personal bests: Outdoor: 6.75 m Indoor: 6.56 m
Medal record
Women's athletics
Representing Slovakia
European Games
Gold medal – first place	2015 Baku	Mixed team
- Updated on 4 July 2021

Jana Velďáková (born 3 June 1981) is a Slovak former long jumper. She was born in Rožnava and has a twin sister named Dana, who is a triple jumper.

Her personal bests in the event are 6.75 metres outdoors (Banská Bystrica 2016) and 6.56 metres indoors (Stuttgart 2007).

== Achievements ==
Year	Competition	Venue	Position	Event	Notes
Representing Slovakia
2000	World Junior Championships	Santiago, Chile	12th	Long jump	5.70 m (-1.1 m/s)
2001	European U23 Championships	Amsterdam, Netherlands	8th	Long jump	6.02 m
2003	European U23 Championships	Bydgoszcz, Poland	18th (q)	Long jump	6.00 m
2003	Universiade	Daegu, South Korea	8th	Long jump	6.17 m
2005	European Indoor Championships	Madrid, Spain	22nd (q)	Long jump	4.30 m
2005	Universiade	İzmir, Turkey	11th	Long jump	5.71 m
2006	European Championships	Gothenburg, Sweden	12th	Long jump	6.29 m
2007	European Indoor Championships	Birmingham, United Kingdom	13th (q)	Long jump	6.44 m
2007	World Championships	Osaka, Japan	12th	Long jump	6.21 m
2007	Universiade	Bangkok, Thailand	10th	Long jump	6.30 m
2008	Olympic Games	Beijing, China	– (q)	Long jump	NM
2009	European Indoor Championships	Turin, Italy	14th (q)	Long jump	6.22 m
2009	World Championships	Berlin, Germany	32nd (q)	Long jump	6.16 m
2010	European Championships	Barcelona, Spain	9th	Long jump	6.54 m
2011	European Indoor Championships	Paris, France	19th (q)	Long jump	6.11 m
2012	European Championships	Helsinki, Finland	9th	Long jump	6.31 m
2012	Olympic Games	London, United Kingdom	27th (q)	Long jump	6.18 m
2013	European Indoor Championships	Gothenburg, Sweden	15th (q)	Long jump	6.17 m
2013	World Championships	Moscow, Russia	18th (q)	Long jump	6.48 m
2014	European Championships	Zurich, Switzerland	17th (q)	Long jump	6.24 m
2015	European Indoor Championships	Prague, Czech Republic	15th (q)	Long jump	6.29 m
2015	World Championships	Beijing, China	17th (q)	Long jump	6.56 m
2016	European Championships	Amsterdam, Netherlands	10th	Long jump	6.47 m
2016	Olympic Games	Rio de Janeiro, Brazil	15th (q)	Long jump	6.48 m
2017	European Indoor Championships	Belgrade, Serbia	12th (q)	Long jump	6.34 m
