= 2015 World Championships in Athletics – Women's long jump =

Women's long jump at the 2015 World Championships
- Venue: Beijing National Stadium
- Dates: 27 August (qualification); 28 August (final)
- Competitors: 34 from 20 nations
- Winning distance: 7.14

Medalists
gold medal	Tianna Bartoletta	United States
silver medal	Shara Proctor	Great Britain
bronze medal	Ivana Španović	Serbia

The women's long jump at the 2015 World Championships in Athletics was held at the Beijing National Stadium on 27 and 28 August. Defending champion Brittney Reese returned but was unable to get out of the qualification round. Katarina Johnson-Thompson could have used her 6.79 automatic qualifier in her heptathlon earlier in the week, 6.79 meters further than she received credit for.

In the first round of the final, Christabel Nettey took the early lead with a 6.95. Janay DeLoach Soukup pulled into second with a 6,67 while most of the field struggled to find the board. Ivana Španović then popped 7.01 for a new Serbian National Record. World #1 Tianna Bartoletta put out a 6.95 in the second round to almost pull even with Nettey. Bartoletta's third round 6.87 narrowly broke the tie to briefly put her into second place. On the last jump of the third round Shara Proctor jumped 7.07 for a new British Record and the lead. Nobody made any improvements in the fourth and fifth rounds. On her final attempt, Bartoletta leaped a world leading 7.14 to take the lead. Španović then duplicated her 7.01 but no improvement. When Proctor fouled her final attempt, the medals were settled.

== Records ==
Prior to the competition, the established records were as follows.

World record	Galina Chistyakova (URS)	7.52	Leningrad, Soviet Union	11 June 1988
Championship record	Jackie Joyner-Kersee (USA)	7.36	Rome, Italy	3 September 1987
World leading	Tianna Bartoletta (USA)	7.12	Eugene, United States	27 June 2015
African record	Chioma Ajunwa (NGR)	7.12	Atlanta, GA, United States	2 August 1996
Asian record	Yao Weili (CHN)	7.01	Jinan, People's Republic of China	5 June 1993
North, Central American and Caribbean record	Jackie Joyner-Kersee (USA)	7.49	New York City, United States	22 May 1994
North, Central American and Caribbean record	Jackie Joyner-Kersee (USA)	7.49	Sestriere, Italy	31 July 1994
South American record	Maurren Higa Maggi (BRA)	7.26A	Bogotá, Colombia	26 June 1999
European record	Galina Chistyakova (URS)	7.52	Leningrad, Soviet Union	11 June 1988
Oceanian record	Bronwyn Thompson (AUS)	7.00	Melbourne, Australia	7 March 2002
The following records were established during the competition:
World Leading	Tianna Bartoletta (USA)	7.14	Beijing, China	28 August 2015

== Qualification standards ==
Entry standards
6.70

== Schedule ==
Date	Time	Round
27 August 2015	10:20	Qualification
28 August 2015	19:50	Final

All times are local times (UTC+8)

== Results ==
=== Qualification ===
Qualification: 6.75 m (Q) and at least 12 best (q) advanced to the final.

Rank	Group	Name	Nationality	# 1	# 2	# 3	Mark	Notes
1	A	Ivana Španović	Serbia	6.91			6.91	Q, NR
2	B	Lorraine Ugen	Great Britain & N.I.	6.29	6.61	6.87	6.87	Q
3	B	Malaika Mihambo	Germany	6.84			6.84	Q, SB
4	B	Christabel Nettey	Canada	6.68	6.52	6.79	6.79	Q
5	A	Katarina Johnson-Thompson	Great Britain & N.I.	6.54	6.79		6.79	Q
6	B	Nastassia Mironchyk-Ivanova	Belarus	6.71	6.76		6.76	Q
7	A	Tianna Bartoletta	United States	6.71	6.66	6.71	6.71	q
8	B	Khaddi Sagnia	Sweden	6.53	6.54	6.71	6.71	q
9	A	Darya Klishina	Russia	6.71	x	x	6.71	q
10	A	Erica Jarder	Sweden	6.70	x	6.53	6.70	q, SB
11	B	Shara Proctor	Great Britain & N.I.	6.67	6.68	6.57	6.68	q
12	B	Janay DeLoach Soukup	United States	6.27	6.65	6.68	6.68	q
13	A	Volha Sudarava	Belarus	x	6.65	6.48	6.65	
14	A	Brooke Stratton	Australia	6.57	6.55	6.64	6.64	
15	B	Alina Rotaru	Romania	6.45	6.58	6.43	6.58	
16	B	Yuliya Pidluzhnaya	Russia	6.51	x	6.57	6.57	
17	A	Jana Velďáková	Slovakia	6.40	x	6.56	6.56	
18	A	Krystyna Hryshutyna	Ukraine	6.53	6.28	x	6.53	
19	A	Jasmine Todd	United States	x	6.26	6.52	6.52	
20	A	Aiga Grabuste	Latvia	x	6.48	x	6.48	
21	B	Chantel Malone	British Virgin Islands	6.22	6.46	6.10	6.46	
22	B	Lena Malkus	Germany	x	6.46	3.99	6.46	
23	A	Yelena Sokolova	Russia	6.31	x	6.44	6.44	
24	B	Brittney Reese	United States	6.39	6.23	6.17	6.39	
25	B	Bianca Stuart	Bahamas	6.34	6.31	x	6.34	
26	B	Keila Costa	Brazil	6.32	x	x	6.32	
27	A	Sosthene Moguenara	Germany	x	x	6.23	6.23	
28	B	Tânia da Silva	Brazil	6.16	6.18	6.08	6.18	
29	A	Paola Mautino	Peru	6.15	6.03	5.80	6.15	
30	B	Lu Minjia	China	6.01	x	6.01	6.01	
31	B	Claudia Guri	Andorra	5.46	5.59	5.33	5.59	
	A	Eliane Martins	Brazil	x	x	x	NM	
	A	Florentina Marincu	Romania	x	x	x	NM	
	A	María del Mar Jover	Spain	x	x	x	NM	

=== Final ===
The final was started at 19:50

Rank	Name	Nationality	# 1	# 2	# 3	# 4	# 5	# 6	Mark	Note
1st place, gold medalist(s)	Tianna Bartoletta	United States	x	6.95	6.87	6.62	6.94	7.14	7.14	WL
2nd place, silver medalist(s)	Shara Proctor	Great Britain & N.I.	x	6.87	7.07	7.01	x	x	7.07	NR
3rd place, bronze medalist(s)	Ivana Španović	Serbia	7.01	x	x	6.86	6.98	7.01	7.01	NR
4	Christabel Nettey	Canada	6.95	6.85	x	6.69	6.84	x	6.95	
5	Lorraine Ugen	Great Britain & N.I.	x	6.85	6.73	x	x	x	6.85	
6	Malaika Mihambo	Germany	x	6.79	x	x	6.60	–	6.79	
7	Khaddi Sagnia	Sweden	x	6.67	6.56	6.40	6.78	5.05	6.78	PB
8	Janay DeLoach Soukup	United States	6.67	x	6.64	6.53	x	x	6.67	
9	Nastassia Mironchyk-Ivanova	Belarus	6.66	x	6.53				6.66	
10	Darya Klishina	Russia	6.60	6.65	6.50				6.65	
11	Katarina Johnson-Thompson	Great Britain & N.I.	6.63	x	6.63				6.63	
12	Erica Jarder	Sweden	x	x	6.48				6.48	
