= Shara Proctor =

British jumper (born 1988)

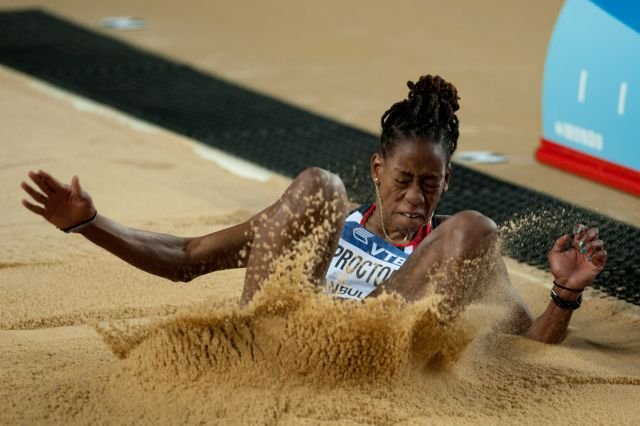
- Proctor at the 2012 IAAF World Indoor Championships

Personal information
- Nationality: British
- Born: 16 September 1988 (age 38) The Valley, Anguilla
- Height: 1.73 m (5 ft 8 in)
- Weight: 60 kg (132 lb)

Sport
- Sport: Track and field
- Event: Long jump
- College team: University of Florida
- Coached by: Rana Reider
Medal record
Women's athletics
Representing Great Britain
World Championships
Silver medal – second place	2015 Beijing	Long jump
World Indoor Championships
Bronze medal – third place	2012 Istanbul	Long jump
European Championships
Bronze medal – third place	2018 Berlin	Long jump
Diamond League
Gold medal – first place	2013	Long jump
Silver medal – second place	2012	Long jump
Bronze medal – third place	2015	Long jump
Representing England
Commonwealth Games
Bronze medal – third place	2018 Gold Coast	Long jump
Representing Anguilla
CAC Championships
Gold medal – first place	2009 Havana	Long jump
Silver medal – second place	2008 Cali	Long jump

Shara Proctor (born 16 September 1988) is a British former long jumper born in Anguilla. She is the national record holder of both Anguilla and Great Britain. On 28 August 2015 at the World Championships in Beijing, she became the first British female long-jumper to jump over 7 metres (7.07), setting a new British record and earning a world championship silver medal in the process. She also won the 2013 IAAF Diamond League in the event. Her younger sister is the Anguillan sprinter Shinelle Proctor.

== Career ==
=== Representing Anguilla ===
She competed at the 2006 Commonwealth Games and the 2007 World Championships for Anguilla, but without reaching the final round.

In November 2010, she announced that she would be competing for Great Britain at events held by the IAAF, as Anguilla is a British Overseas Territory and cannot send delegations to the Olympic Games for not having your National Olympic Committee (NOC) recognized. A British Overseas Territory, Anguilla does not have a National Olympic Committee (NOC) of its own; However, this would not prevent Proctor from competing for Great Britain, as the responsibilities of the National Olympic Committee for the territory are the responsibility of the British Olympic Association (BOA). However, this would not happen at World Athletics competitions and at the Commonwealth Games because Anguilla is an effective member of both associations. After the change of nation, she was invited to compete for the English team at the 2014 Commonwealth Games in Glasgow.

=== Representing Great Britain and England ===
In 2012, Proctor won her first senior medal for Great Britain, a bronze medal in the long jump in the IAAF World Indoor Athletics Championships, after a British national indoor record leap of 6.89 metres.

Her longest jumps outdoors are 7.07 metres in the long jump, achieved in August 2015 in Beijing; and 13.74 metres in the triple jump, achieved in May 2009 in Greensboro.

In November 2012 Proctor moved from her training base at Embry-Riddle Aeronautical University, Daytona Beach to Loughborough when her coach Rana Reider was recruited to work at UK Athletics. On Reider's move to the Netherlands, Proctor relocated to stay with her coach.

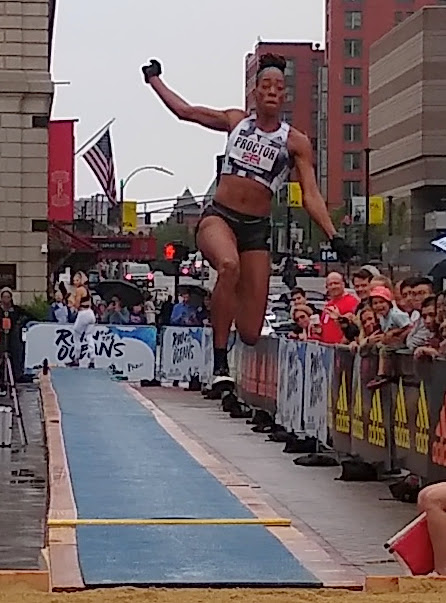
Proctor competing in the long jump at the Adidas Boost Boston Games in 2019

On 28 August 2015 at the World Championships in Beijing she became the first British female long jumper to jump over 7 metres (7.07) thus setting a new British record, and earning a silver medal.

Proctor won bronze medals at the 2018 Commonwealth Games and 2018 European Athletics Championships. She announced her retirement from athletics in 2022.

== Achievements ==
Year	Competition	Venue	Position	Event	Notes
Representing Anguilla
2003	CARIFTA Games (U17)	Port of Spain, Trinidad and Tobago	8th	High jump	1.55m
2003	CARIFTA Games (U17)	Port of Spain, Trinidad and Tobago	3rd	Long jump	5.45m (1.1 m/s)
2004	CARIFTA Games (U17)	Hamilton, Bermuda	6th	High jump	1.50m
2004	CARIFTA Games (U17)	Hamilton, Bermuda	2nd	Long jump	5.83m w (NWI)
2004	CAC Junior Championships (U17)	Port of Spain, Trinidad and Tobago	1st	Long jump	5.99m
2005	CARIFTA Games (U-20)	Bacolet, Trinidad and Tobago	5th (h)	200 m	26.66 (0.0 m/s)
2005	CARIFTA Games (U-20)	Bacolet, Trinidad and Tobago	2nd	Long jump	6.24m NR (0.4 m/s)
2006	CARIFTA Games (U-20)	Les Abymes, Guadeloupe	1st	Long jump	6.17m (0.0 m/s)
2006	Commonwealth Games	Melbourne, Australia	13th (q)	Long jump	6.06 m
2006	CAC Junior Championships (U20)	Port of Spain, Trinidad and Tobago	3rd	Long jump	6.08m
2006	World Junior Championships	Beijing, China	16th (q)	Long jump	6.01 m (wind: 0.0 m/s)
2007	CARIFTA Games (U-20)	Providenciales, Turks and Caicos Islands	1st	Long jump	6.17m (−0.3 m/s)
2007	World Championships	Osaka, Japan	29th (q)	Long jump	5.82 m
2008	Central American and Caribbean Championships	Cali, Colombia	2nd	Long jump	6.54 m
2008	Central American and Caribbean Championships	Cali, Colombia	7th	Triple jump	12.99 m
2008	NACAC U-23 Championships	Toluca, Mexico	4th	Long jump	6.23m (wind: NWI) A
2008	NACAC U-23 Championships	Toluca, Mexico	2nd	Triple jump	13.11m (wind: NWI) A
2009	Central American and Caribbean Championships	Havana, Cuba	1st	Long jump	6.61 m
2009	World Championships	Berlin, Germany	6th	Long jump	6.71 m NR
2010	NACAC U23 Championships	Miramar, United States	1st	Long jump	6.43m (wind: 0.9 m/s)
Representing Great Britain and England
2011	World Championships	Daegu, South Korea	20th (q)	Long jump	6.34 m
2012	World Indoor Championships	Istanbul, Turkey	3rd	Long jump	6.89 m NR
2012	Olympic Games	London, United Kingdom	6th	Long jump	6.55 m
2013	European Indoor Championships	Gothenburg, Sweden	4th	Long jump	6.69 m
2013	World Championships	Moscow, Russia	6th	Long jump	6.79 m
2014	World Indoor Championships	Sopot, Poland	4th	Long jump	6.68 m
2014	Commonwealth Games	Glasgow, United Kingdom	4th (q)	Long jump	6.51 m
2015	World Championships	Beijing, China	2nd	Long jump	7.07m NR
2016	World Indoor Championships	Portland, United States	8th	Long jump	6.57 m
2016	Olympic Games	Rio de Janeiro, Brazil	21st (q)	Long jump	6.36 m
2017	World Championships	London, United Kingdom	13th (q)	Long jump	6.45 m
2018	Commonwealth Games	Gold Coast, Australia	3rd	Long jump	6.75 m
2018	European Championships	Berlin, Germany	3rd	Long jump	6.70 m
2019	World Championships	Doha, Qatar	11th	Long jump	6.43 m
