= Nina Kolarič =

Slovenian long jumper

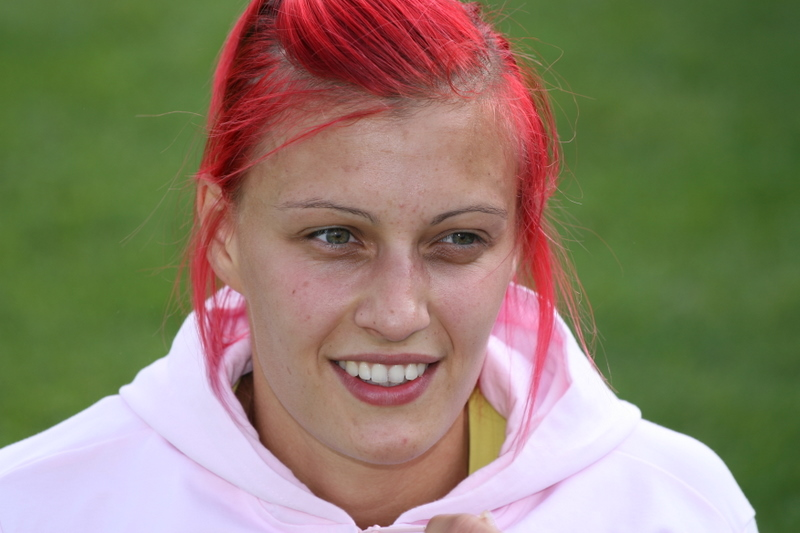
- Kolarič in 2007

Personal information
- Full name: Nina Kolarič
- Born: 12 December 1986 (age 39) Ptuj, SFR Yugoslavia

Sport
- Country: Slovenia
- Sport: Athletics
- Event: Long jump

Achievements and titles
- Personal bests: Long jump: 6.78 (NR; Ptuj, June 2008)

Nina Kolarič (born 12 December 1986 in Ptuj) is a Slovenian long jumper. She holds both the indoor and outdoor national records with jumps of 6.67 and 6.78 metres respectively.

Kolarič represented Slovenia at the 2008 Summer Olympics where she finished in 26th place in the long jump.

== Achievements ==
Year	Competition	Venue	Position	Event	Notes
Representing Slovenia
2007	European U23 Championships	Debrecen, Hungary	8th	Long jump	6.37 m (wind: 1.4 m/s)
2007	Universiade	Bangkok, Thailand	13th	Long jump	6.16 m
2008	Olympic Games	Beijing, China	26th (q)	Long jump	6.40 m
2009	European Indoors	Turin, Italy	4th	Long jump	6.62 m
2009	Mediterranean Games	Pescara, Italy	3rd	Long jump	6.50 m
2009	World Championships	Berlin, Germany	35th	Long jump	6.00 m
2010	European Championships	Barcelona, Spain	20th (q)	Long jump	6.43 m
2011	European Indoors	Paris, France	18th (q)	Long jump	6.24 m
2011	World Championships	Daegu, South Korea	27th (q)	Long jump	6.19 m
2013	Mediterranean Games	Mersin, Turkey	2nd	Long jump	6.49 m
