= Irène Pusterla =

Swiss long jumper

Personal information
- Born: 21 June 1988 (age 37) Mendrisio, Switzerland
- Height: 1.76 m (5 ft 9 1/2 in)
- Weight: 64 kg (141 lb)

Sport
- Country: Switzerland
- Sport: Athletics
- Event: Long jump

Irène Pusterla (born 21 June 1988 in Mendrisio) is a Swiss long jumper.

== Achievements ==
Year	Competition	Venue	Position	Event	Notes
Representing Switzerland
2004	World Junior Championships	Grosseto, Italy	12th (h)	4 × 100 m relay	45.77
2007	European Junior Championships	Hengelo, Netherlands	6th	Long jump	6.21 m
2009	European Indoor Championships	Turin, Italy	12th (q)	Long jump	6.31 m
2009	European U23 Championships	Kaunas, Lithuania	7th	Long jump	6.57 m w (wind: 4.9 m/s)
2010	European Championships	Barcelona, Spain	13th (q)	Long jump	6.62 m
2011	European Indoor Championships	Paris, France	8th	Long jump	6.43 m
2011	World Championships	Daegu, South Korea	19th (q)	Long jump	6.34 m
2012	World Indoor Championships	Istanbul, Turkey	12th (q)	Long jump	6.45 m
2012	European Championships	Helsinki, Finland	6th	Long jump	6.53 m
2014	European Championships	Zürich, Switzerland	13th (q)	Long jump	6.39 m
