= List of Slovenian records in athletics =

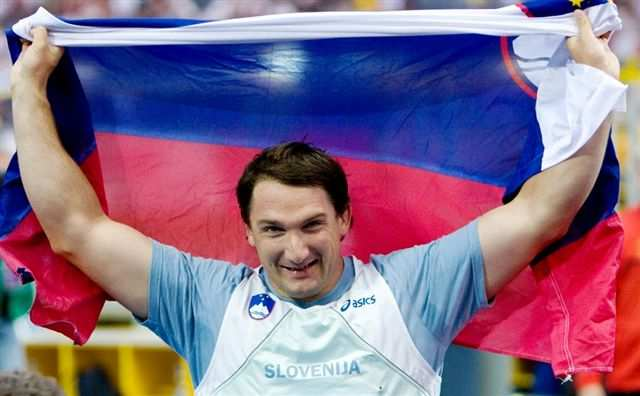

The following are the national records in athletics in Slovenia maintained by its national athletics federation: Atletska Zveza Slovenije (AZS).

== Outdoor ==
Key to tables: Awaiting ratification Record not kept by AZS Not ratified or later rescinded by AZS

=== Men ===
Event	Record	Athlete	Date	Meet	Place	Ref.
100 y	9.72+ (+1.0 m/s)	Matic Osovnikar	31 May 2011	Golden Spike Ostrava	Ostrava, Czech Republic	
100 m	10.09 (+1.6 m/s)	Anej Čurin Prapotnik	19 June 2026	Slovenian Championships	Maribor, Slovenia	
200 m	20.47 (+0.5 m/s)	Matic Osovnikar	24 August 2004	Olympic Games	Athens, Greece	
300 m	31.89	Luka Janežič	27 May 2017	Stepišnikov Memorial	Slovenska Bistrica, Slovenia	
400 m	44.70	Rok Ferlan	28 June 2025	European Team Championships	Maribor, Slovenia	
600 m	1:15.49	Žan Rudolf	8 May 2016	26. Internationales Läufermeeting	Pliezhausen, Germany	
800 m	1:46.00	Žan Rudolf	1 July 2015	20th International Athletic Meeting in Honor of Miner's Day	Velenje, Slovenia	
1000 m	2:19.03	Žan Rudolf	5 May 2024	Internationales thallos Läufermeeting	Pliezhausen, Germany	
1500 m	3:39.29	Aleš Tomič	8 July 2002		Zagreb, Croatia	
1500 m	3:34.23	Žan Rudolf	26 June 2026	Hanžeković Memorial	Zagreb, Croatia	
Mile	3:58.89	Bekim Bahtiri	25 August 1993		Linz, Austria	
Mile (road)	3:58.85	Žan Rudolf	19 September 2026	World Road Running Championships	Copenhagen, Denmark	
2000 m	5:08.4 h	Stane Miklavžina	9 August 1981		Zagreb, S.F.R. Yugoslavia	
3000 m	7:51.35	Stanko Lisec	7 June 1978		Gothenburg, Sweden	
5000 m	13:32.8	Peter Svet	12 June 1974		East Berlin, East Germany	
5000 m	13:27.96	Vid Botolin	1 August 2026	IFAM Oordegem	Oordegem, Belgium	
5 km (road)	13:41	Vid Botolin	19 September 2026	World Road Running Championships	Copenhagen, Denmark	
10,000 m	28:32.86	Stane Rozman	30 June 1983		Lausanne, Switzerland	
10 km (road)	28:45	Jan Kokalj	16 May 2026	Corri Trieste	Trieste, Italy	
10 km (road)	28:34	Vid Botolin	17 October 2026	Ljubljana Generali Halfmarathon & Garmin 10 km	Ljubljana, Slovenia	
20,000 m (track)	59:54.2	Numan Ukić	2 October 1980		Celje, S.F.R. Yugoslavia	
One hour	20042 m	Numan Ukić	2 October 1980		Celje, S.F.R. Yugoslavia	
Half marathon	1:01:57	Jan Kokalj	20 September 2026	World Road Running Championships	Copenhagen, Denmark	
30 km (road)	1:36:47.6	Mirko Vindiš	1 April 1994		Velenje, Slovenia	
Marathon	2:11:50	Roman Kejžar	26 March 2000		Turin, Italy	
110 m hurdles	13.47 (+0.4 m/s)	Filip Demšar	29 June 2025	European Team Championships	Maribor, Slovenia	
300 m hurdles	34.14	Matic Ian Guček	16 May 2026	Shanghai Diamond League	Shaoxing/Keqiao, China	
400 m hurdles	48.25	Matic Ian Guček	8 August 2025	TIPOS P-T-S Meeting	Banská Bystrica, Slovakia	
400 m hurdles	48.16	Matic Ian Guček	16 June 2026	Golden Spike Ostrava	Ostrava, Czechia	
400 m hurdles	48.03	Matic Ian Guček	12 August 2026	European Championships	Birmingham, United Kingdom	
400 m hurdles	47.80	Matic Ian Guček	27 August 2026	Weltklasse Zürich	Zurich, Switzerland	
2000 m steeplechase	5:31.19	Janko Podgoršek	12 July 1998		Formia, Italy	
3000 m steeplechase	8:16.96	Boštjan Buč	12 June 2003	Golden Spike Ostrava	Ostrava, Czech Republic	
High jump	2.32 m	Rožle Prezelj	17 June 2012	Slovenian Cup	Maribor, Slovenia	
Pole vault	5.70 m	Robert Renner	22 August 2015	World Championships	Beijing, China	
Long jump	8.40 m (+2.0 m/s)	Gregor Cankar	18 May 1997		Celje, Slovenia	
Triple jump	16.82 m (+1.8 m/s)	Boštjan Simunič	1 June 2002		Ljubljana, Slovenia	
Shot put	20.76 m	Miran Vodovnik	17 June 2006		Thessaloniki, Greece	
Discus throw	72.61 m	Kristjan Čeh	9 April 2026	Oklahoma Throws Series World Invitational	Ramona, United States	
Hammer throw	82.58 m	Primož Kozmus	2 September 2009	Celje Dukes International Meeting	Celje, Slovenia	
Javelin throw	81.13 m	Matija Kranjc	23 June 2016		Brežice, Slovenia	
Decathlon	7718 pts	Damjan Sitar	31 May – 1 June 2008		Maribor, Slovenia	
Decathlon	100m (wind) / Long jump (wind) / Shot put / High jump / 400m / 110m H (wind) / Discus / Pole vault / Javelin / 1500m; 11.07 / 7.24 m / 12.93 m / 2.02 m / 49.85 / 14.67 / 43.41 m / 4.50 m / 45.68 m / 4:23.76					
5 km walk (road)	20:04.8	Edvard Kolar	11 April 1981		Celje, S.F.R. Yugoslavia	
10,000 m walk (track)	42:19.1	Milan Balek	9 June 1990		Celje, S.F.R. Yugoslavia	
10 km walk (road)	44:48.0	Fabio Ruzzier	16 April 2005		Udine, Italy	
20,000 m walk (track)	1:28:03.2	Milan Balek	28 August 1983		Postojna, S.F.R. Yugoslavia	
20 km walk (road)	1:37:05	Fabio Ruzzier	29 May 2004		San Giovanni in Marignano, Italy	
30 km walk (road)	2:24:43	Milan Balek	1 May 1990		Milan, Italy	
50 km walk (road)	4:18:28	Milan Balek	16 October 1983		Wien, Austria	
4 × 100 m relay	38.99	Slovenia; Jernej Gumilar; Jurij Beber; Andrej Skočir; Anej Čurin Prapotnik	20 July 2025	European U23 Championships	Bergen, Norway	
4 × 200 m relay	1:25.84	Rok Predanič; P. Oberaurner; T. Fakin; Matija Šestak	19 June 1999		Istanbul, Turkey	
4 × 400 m relay	3:02.70	Slovenia; Miro Kocuvan; Boštjan Horvat; Jože Vrtačič; Matija Šestak	28 August 1999	World Championships	Seville, Spain	
4 × 800 m relay	7:37.87	Z. Planinšec; L. Leitinger; J. Štern; U. Verhovnik	19 May 1996		Landshut, Germany	
4 × 1500 m relay	15:29.7	F. Kovač; D. Žuntar; F. Červan; S. Važić	25 September 1966		Trbovlje, S.F.R. Yugoslavia	

=== Women ===
Event	Record	Athlete	Date	Meet	Place	Ref.
100 m	11.09 (+2.0 m/s)	Merlene Ottey	3 August 2004		Liège, Belgium	
200 m	22.72 (+1.4 m/s)	Merlene Ottey	23 August 2004	Olympic Games	Athens, Greece	
150 m	17.30 (+0.6 m/s)	Maja Mihalinec	8 September 2020	Golden Spike Ostrava	Ostrava, Czech Republic	
300 m	36.77	Agata Zupin	30 August 2017		Domžale, Slovenia	
400 m	51.22	Anita Horvat	20 July 2018	Herculis	Fontvieille, Monaco	
600 m	1:26.26	Anita Horvat	29 April 2023	Walk ad Middle Distance Night	Milan, Italy	
600 m	1:25.84	Brigita Langerholc	3 June 2007		Ljubljana, Slovenia	
800 m	1:55.19	Jolanda Čeplak	20 July 2002	KBC Night of Athletics	Heusden-Zolder, Netherlands	
1000 m	2:31.66	Jolanda Čeplak	28 August 2002		Rovereto, Italy	
1500 m	4:02.13	Sonja Roman	10 July 2009	Golden Gala	Rome, Italy	
Mile	4:28.82	Maruša Mišmaš-Zrimsek	11 September 2022	Hanžeković Memorial	Zagreb, Croatia	
Mile (road)	4:47.00 Wo	Veronika Sadek	1 October 2023	World Road Running Championships	Riga, Latvia	
2000 m	5:40.91	Klara Lukan	14 September 2021	Hanžeković Memorial	Zagreb, Croatia	
3000 m	8:50.71	Helena Javornik	8 July 2000	Pedros Cup	Bydgoszcz, Poland	
5000 m	15:01.37	Klara Lukan	10 June 2023	Fast5000	Montesson, France	
5 km (road)	14:45 Mx	Klara Lukan	9 February 2025	Monaco Run 5K	Monaco	
5 km (road)	15:25 Wo	Klara Lukan	1 October 2023	World Road Running Championships	Riga, Latvia	
10,000 m	31:06.63	Helena Javornik	27 August 2004	Olympic Games	Athens, Greece	
10 km (road)	29:50 Mx (Note: by AZS source; 29:51 by European Athletics source)	Klara Lukan	18 April 2026	Ruta Villa de Laredo	Laredo, Spain	
One hour	17070 m+	Helena Javornik	19 July 2006		Maribor, Slovenia	
20,000 m (track)	1:10:30.4+	Helena Javornik	19 July 2006		Maribor, Slovenia	
Half marathon	1:06:43 Mx	Klara Lukan	15 March 2026	Medio Maratón de Málaga	Málaga, Spain	
25,000 m (track)	1:28:22.60+	Helena Javornik	19 July 2006		Maribor, Slovenia	
Marathon	2:27:33	Helena Javornik	27 October 2004		Amsterdam, Netherlands	
100 m hurdles	12.59 (+0.2 m/s)	Brigita Bukovec	31 July 1996	Olympic Games	Atlanta, United States	
200 m hurdles	26.95 (+0.2 m/s)	Meta Mačus	31 May 2000		Trento, Italy	
300 m hurdles	41.86	Agata Zupin	8 September 2020	Golden Spike Ostrava	Ostrava, Czech Republic	
400 m hurdles	55.96	Agata Zupin	23 July 2017	European U20 Championships	Grosseto, Italy	
2000 m steeplechase	5:53.38	Maruša Mišmaš-Zrimsek	10 September 2023	Hanžeković Memorial	Zagreb, Croatia	
3000 m steeplechase	9:06.37	Maruša Mišmaš-Zrimsek	27 August 2023	World Championships	Budapest, Hungary	
High jump	2.00 m	Britta Bilač	14 August 1994		Helsinki, Finland	
Pole vault	4.81 m	Tina Šutej	16 September 2023	Prefontaine Classic	Eugene, United States	
Long jump	6.78 m (+1.8 m/s)	Nina Kolarič	29 June 2008		Ptuj, Slovenia	
Triple jump	15.03 m (+1.1 m/s)	Marija Šestak	17 August 2008	Olympic Games	Beijing, China	
Shot put	18.10 m	Nataša Erjavec	14 May 1994		Nova Gorica, Slovenia	
Discus throw	60.11 m	Veronika Domjan	6 July 2016	European Championships	Amsterdam, Netherlands	
Hammer throw	71.25 m	Barbara Špiler	5 May 2012		Čakovec, Croatia	
Javelin throw	67.16 m	Martina Ratej	14 May 2010	Qatar Athletic Super Grand Prix	Doha, Qatar	
Heptathlon	5740 pts	Vladha Lopatic	16–17 May 1992		Brescia, Italy	
Heptathlon	100m H (wind) / High jump / Shot put / 200m (wind) / Long jump (wind) / Javelin / 800m; 14.02 / 1.72 m / 11.35 m / 24.76 / 5.26 m / 30.12 m / 2:16.74					
5 km walk (road)	26:48	Eva Čanadi	27 August 2016		Remanzacco, Italy	
10,000 m walk (track)	55:26.13	Eva Čanadi	13 April 2019		Velenje, Slovenia	
10 km walk (road)	55:24	Eva Čanadi	26 May 2018		Borsky Mikulaš, Slovenia	
10 km walk (road)	55:24	Eva Čanadi	3 November 2018		Zagreb, Croatia	
10 km walk (road)	55:05	Eva Čanadi	19 May 2019	European Race Walking Cup	Alytus, Lithuania	
20 km walk (road)	1:48:18	Eva Čanadi	5 October 2019		Dunaj, Slovenia	
4 × 100 m relay	43.91	Slovenia; Alenka Bikar; Kristina Žumer; Maja Nose; Merlene Ottey	25 July 2003		Pergine Valsugana, Italy	
4 × 200 m relay	1:43.3	N. Horvat; I. Bravč; Andreja Bačnik; Z. Weingartner	21 April 1984		Maribor, S.F.R. Yugoslavia	
4 × 400 m relay	3:30.90	Slovenia; Agata Zupin; Jerneja Smonkar; Maja Pogorevc; Anita Horvat	20 June 2021	European Team Championships	Stara Zagora, Bulgaria	
4 × 800 m relay	9:02.96	Mateja Hojs; Marjana Zajfrid; Nina Krašovec; Sonja Roman	11 May 2003		Slovenska Bistrica, Slovenia	

=== Mixed ===
Event	Record	Athlete	Date	Meet	Place	Ref.
4 × 400 m relay	3:14.72	Slovenia; Lovro Mesec Košir; Agata Zupin; Rok Ferlan; Anita Horvat	22 June 2023	European Team Championships	Chorzów, Poland	

== Indoor ==
=== Men ===
Event	Record	Athlete	Date	Meet	Place	Ref.
50 m	5.83	Urban Acman	23 February 1999		Eaubonne, France	
60 m	6.58	Matic Osovnikar	5 March 2004	World Championships	Budapest, Hungary	
60 m	6.58	Matic Osovnikar	10 March 2006	World Championships	Moscow, Russia	
200 m	20.77	Matic Osovnikar	14 March 2003	World Championships	Birmingham, United Kingdom	
300 m	33.94	Jure Grkman	25 January 2018	Czech Indoor Gala	Ostrava, Czech Republic	
400 m	46.02	Luka Janežič	27 January 2018	Indoor Track & Field Vienna	Vienna, Austria	
600 m	1:16.89	Jan Vukovič	31 January 2026		Zagreb, Croatia	
800 m	1:46.96	Žan Rudolf	31 January 2013	Gugl Indoor Meeting	Linz, Austria	
1000 m	2:21.29	Rok Markelj	3 February 2024	Zagreb Open Championships	Zagreb, Croatia	
1500 m	3:43.22	Mitja Krevs	7 March 2014	World Championships	Sopot, Poland	
3000 m	7:55.97	Boštjan Buč	31 January 2003		Erfurt, Germany	
60 m hurdles	7.64	Damjan Zlatnar	29 January 2008		Vienna, Austria	
High jump	2.31 m	Rožle Prezelj	24 January 2004		Ljubljana, Slovenia	
Pole vault	5.62 m	Robert Renner	10 February 2013	Meeting INSA Perch´Formance	Villeurbanne, France	
Long jump	8.28 m	Gregor Cankar	7 March 1999	World Championships	Maebashi, Japan	
Triple jump	16.82 m	Gregor Cankar	19 February 2003		Ljubljana, Slovenia	
Shot put	20.68 m	Miroslav Vodovnik	23 February 2008		Slovenska Bistrica, Slovenia	
Heptathlon	5894 pts	Ranko Leskovar	14–15 February 2004		Linz, Austria	
Heptathlon	60m / Long jump / Shot put / High jump / 60m H / Pole vault / 1000m; 6.93 / 7.50 m / 13.10 m / 2.05 m / 7.98 / 4.80 m / 2:57.12					
3000 m walk	13:23.9	Jaka Grabner	27 February 2022		Zagreb, Croatia	
5000 m walk	20:57.17	Milan Balek	10 February 1990		Athens, Greece	
4 × 200 m relay	1:27.37	Slovenia; M. Stor; Boštjan Horvat; Matija Šestak; T. Bozič	17 February 1996		Vienna, Austria	
4 × 400 m relay	3:10.47	Slovenia; Gregor Grahovač; Rok Ferlan; Lovro Kosir; Luka Janežič	5 March 2022	Balkan Championships	Istanbul, Turkey	

=== Women ===
Event	Record	Athlete	Date	Meet	Place	Ref.
50 m	6.44	Jerneja Perc	2 February 1997		Schielleiten, Austria	
60 m	7.17	Merlene Ottey	7 March 2003		Linz, Austria	
60 m	7.17	Merlene Ottey	14 March 2003	World Championships	Birmingham, United Kingdom	
200 m	23.16	Alenka Bikar	26 February 2000	European Championships	Ghent, Belgium	
300 m	37.34	Anita Horvat	25 January 2018	Czech Indoor Gala	Ostrava, Czech Republic	
400 m	52.22	Anita Horvat	8 February 2018	Meeting Ville de Madrid	Madrid, Spain	
600 m	1:30.05	Brigita Langerholc	13 February 2009		Düsseldorf, Germany	
800 m	1:55.82	Jolanda Čeplak	3 March 2002	European Championships	Vienna, Austria	
1000 m	2:38.03	Jolanda Čeplak	21 February 2003	AVIVA Indoor Grand Prix	Birmingham, United Kingdom	
1500 m	4:05.44	Jolanda Čeplak	9 March 2002		Glasgow, United Kingdom	
Mile	4:29.35	Helena Javornik	24 February 2002	Meeting Pas de Calais	Liévin, France	
2000 m	5:44.93	Helena Javornik	22 February 2002		Chemnitz, Germany	
3000 m	8:44.80 (Note: outdoor mark ratified as absolute record)	Klara Lukan	25 February 2023	World Indour Tour Final	Birmingham, United Kingdom	
50 m hurdles	6.70	Brigita Bukovec	5 February 1999		Budapest, Hungary	
60 m hurdles	7.78	Brigita Bukovec	7 February 1999	Sparkassen Cup	Stuttgart, Germany	
2000 m steeplechase	5:47.79	Maruša Mišmaš	19 February 2020	Meeting Hauts de France Pas de Calais	Liévin, France	
High jump	2.00 m	Britta Bilač	9 February 1994		Frankfurt, Germany	
Pole vault	4.82 m	Tina Šutej	2 February 2023	Czech Indoor Gala	Ostrava, Czech Republic	
Long jump	6.67 m	Nina Kolarič	6 March 2009	European Championships	Turin, Italy	
Triple jump	15.08 m	Marija Šestak	13 February 2008	IAAF Meeting	Athens, Greece	
Shot put	17.97 m	Nataša Erjavec	27 January 1996		Ljubljana, Slovenia	
Pentathlon	4087 pts	Vladka Lopatič	2 February 1996		Budapest, Hungary	
Pentathlon	60m H / High jump / Shot put / Long jump / 800m; 8.80 / 1.70 m / 11.82 m / 6.05 m / 2:24.33					
3000 m walk	15:38.0	Tamara Reicht	27 February 2022		Zagreb, Croatia	
4 × 200 m relay	1:36.36	Slovenia; Jerneja Perc; Saša Prokofjev; Brigita Langerholc; Alenka Bikar	17 February 1996		Vienna, Austria	
4 × 400 m relay	3:37.08	Slovenia; Agata Zupin; Jerneja Smonkar; Veronika Sadek; Anita Horvat	20 March 2022	World Championships	Belgrade, Serbia	
