= Cornelia Deiac =

Romanian long jumper

Cornelia Ioana Deiac (born 20 March 1988) is a Romanian long jumper.

She was born in Oradea. In her early career she won the bronze medal at the 2005 World Youth Championships and finished sixth at the 2006 World Junior Championships. She competed in the 2009 European Indoor Championships and 2010 European Athletics Championships without reaching the final.

She qualified with 6.60 meters in the final of 2011 European Indoor Championships where she ranked seventh with 6.46 meters. She ranked fourth with 6.45 meters in the final of 2011 Summer Universiade in Shenzhen (China).

Her outdoor personal best is 6.70 metres, achieved in July 2010 in Bucharest. Her indoor personal best is 6.67 meters, achieved in January 2012 in Bucharest.

Her height is 171 cm and weight 56 kg. She is studying Psychology at Oradea University.

== Competition record ==
Year	Competition	Venue	Position	Event	Notes
Representing Romania
2004	World Junior Championships	Grosseto, Italy	21st (q)	Long jump	5.37 m (wind: -1.1 m/s)
2005	World Youth Championships	Marrakesh, Morocco	3rd	Long jump	6.25 m
2006	World Junior Championships	Beijing, China	6th	Long jump	6.33 m (wind: -0.3 m/s)
2007	European Junior Championships	Hengelo, Netherlands	18th (q)	Long jump	5.69 m
2009	European Indoor Championships	Turin, Italy	15th (q)	Long jump	6.22 m
2009	Universiade	Belgrade, Serbia	12th	Long jump	6.05 m
2009	European U23 Championships	Kaunas, Lithuania	5th	Long jump	6.61 m (wind: 1.5 m/s)
2010	European Championships	Barcelona, Spain	19th (q)	Long jump	6.46 m
2011	European Indoor Championships	Paris, France	7th	Long jump	6.45 m
2011	Universiade	Shenzhen, China	4th	Long jump	6.45 m
2012	World Indoor Championships	Istanbul, Turkey	17th (q)	Long jump	6.16 m
2013	European Indoor Championships	Gothenburg, Sweden	7th	Long jump	6.52 m
2013	Universiade	Kazan, Russia	4th	Long jump	6.38 m
2013	Jeux de la Francophonie	Nice, France	5th	Long jump	6.48 m (w)
2014	European Championships	Zurich, Switzerland	18th (q)	Long jump	6.23 m
