= Éloyse Lesueur-Aymonin =

French long jumper

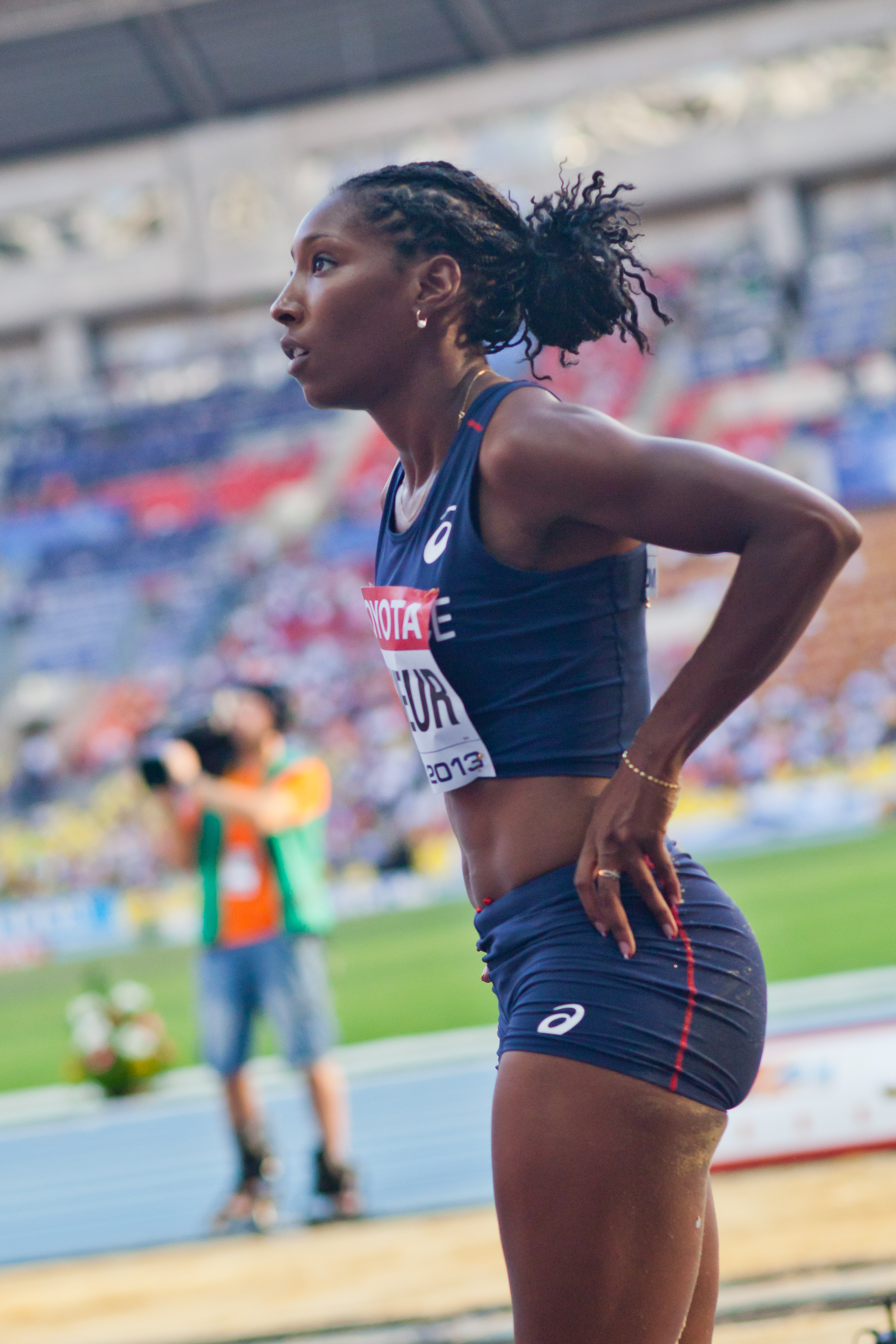
- Lesueur during 2013 World Championships in Athletics in Moscow

Personal information
- Born: 15 July 1988 (age 38) Créteil, France
- Height: 180 cm (5 ft 11 in)
- Weight: 64 kg (141 lb)

Sport
- Country: France
- Sport: Athletics
- Event: Long jump

Achievements and titles
- Personal bests: outdoor - 6.91 m (2011); indoor - 6.90 m (2013)
Medal record
World Indoor Championships
Gold medal – first place	2014 Sopot	Long jump
European Championships
Gold medal – first place	2012 Helsinki	Long jump
Gold medal – first place	2014 Zurich	Long jump
European Indoors Championships
Silver medal – second place	2013 Gothenburg	Long jump
Continental Cup
Gold medal – first place	2014 Marrakesh	Long jump
World Youth Championships
Silver medal – second place	2005 Marrakesh	Long jump
European U23 Championships
Bronze medal – third place	2009 Kaunas	Long jump
European Junior Championships
Silver medal – second place	2007 Hengelo	Long jump

Éloyse Lesueur (born 15 July 1988) is a French long jumper.

== Career ==
Lesueur became the first woman from France to win a long jump gold medal at the European Championships when she won the 2012 European Championships long jump event in Helsinki by jumping 6.81 meters in the final.

Lesueur currently holds the French national indoor record of 6.90 m. This record was set in the final of the 2013 European Indoor Championships in Gothenburg, where she won the silver medal.

Lesueur withdrew from the 2015 World Championships in Athletics because of torn ligaments in her right knee sustained during training in May 2015.

== Results in international competitions ==
Note: Only the position and distance in the final are indicated, unless otherwise stated. (q) means the athlete did not qualify for the final, with the overall position and distance in the qualification round indicated.

Year	Competition	Venue	Position	Event	Notes
Representing France
2005	World Youth Championships	Marrakesh, Morocco	2nd	Long jump	6.28 m
2006	World Junior Championships	Beijing, China	—	Heptathlon	DNF
2007	European Junior Championships	Hengelo, Netherlands	2nd	Long jump	6.34 m
2008	World Indoor Championships	Valencia, Spain	4th	Long jump	6.60 m
2009	European U23 Championships	Kaunas, Lithuania	3rd	Long jump	6.72 m (SB)
2009	World Championships	Berlin, Germany	18th (q)	Long jump	6.40 m (q)
2010	European Team Championships	Bergen, Norway	1st	Long jump	6.78 m (PB)
2011	European Indoor Championships	Paris, France	4th	Long jump	6.59 m
2011	European Team Championships	Stockholm, Sweden	3rd	Long jump	6.60 m
2011	World Championships	Daegu, South Korea	26th (q)	Long jump	6.22 m (q)
2011	DécaNation	Nice, France	1st	Long jump	6,91 m
2012	European Championships	Helsinki, Finland	1st	Long jump	6.81 m (SB)
2012	Olympic Games	London, United Kingdom	8th	Long jump	6.67 m
2013	European Indoor Championships	Gothenburg, Sweden	2nd	Long jump	6.90 m (iNR)
2013	European Team Championships	Gateshead, United Kingdom	1st	Long jump	6.44 m
2013	World Championships	Moscow, Russia	22nd (q)	Long jump	6.39 m (q)
2014	World Indoor Championships	Sopot, Poland	1st	Long jump	6.85 m
2014	European Championships	Zurich, Switzerland	1st	Long jump	6.85 m
2014	DécaNation	Angers, France	1st	Long jump	6,79 m
2015	European Indoor Championships	Prague, Czech Republic	5th	Long jump	6.73 m
2018	World Indoor Championships	Birmingham, United Kingdom	12th	Long jump	6.34 m
2018	European Championships	Berlin, Germany	–	Long jump	NM
2019	European Indoor Championships	Glasgow, United Kingdom	13th (q)	Long jump	6.37 m
2019	World Championships	Doha, Qatar	21st (q)	Long jump	6.46 m
