= Sirkka-Liisa Kivine =

Estonian athletics competitor

Sirkka-Liisa Kivine (born 22 June 1977) is an Estonian athletics competitor.

She was born in Paide. In 2002 she graduated from Tartu University's Institute of Physical Education.

She started her athletics career exercising under the guidance of Tiina Torop and Mehis Viru. 2002–2010 her coach was Ivo Kala. She has competed at the World Athletics Championships and Summer Universiade. She is multiple-times Estonian champion in long and triple jump, and also in relay. She has been a member of Estonian national athletics team.

Records:

- long jump: 6.67 (2008)
- triple jump: 13.76 (2003)
