= Yuliya Pidluzhnaya =

Russian long jumper

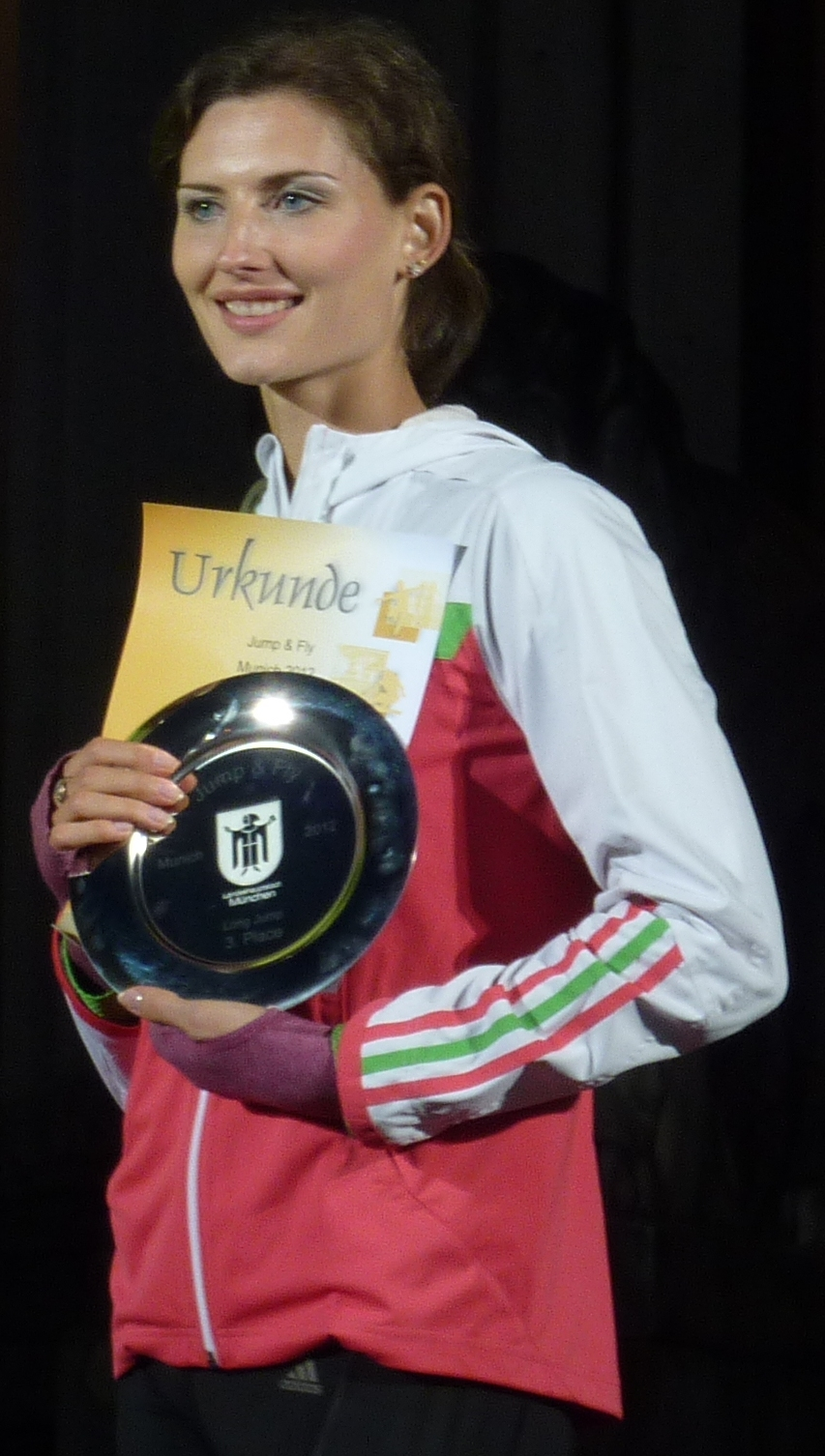
Yuliya Pidluzhnaya (2012)

Yuliya Vitalyevna Pidluzhnaya (Russian: Юлия Витальевна Пидлужная; born October 1, 1988 in Sverdlovsk) is a Russian long jumper.

== International competitions ==
Year	Competition	Venue	Position	Event	Result	Notes
2005	World Youth Championships	Marrakesh, Morocco	9th	Long jump	6.01 m	
2006	World Junior Championships	Beijing, China	10th (q)	Long jump	6.18 m	
2007	European Junior Championships	Hengelo, Netherlands	3rd	Long jump	6.28	
2011	European Indoor Championships	Paris, France	3rd	Long jump	6.75 m	
2011	Universiade	Shenzhen, China	2nd	Long jump	6.56 m	
2015	Universiade	Gwangju, South Korea	1st	Long jump	6.79 m	
2015	World Championships	Beijing, China	16th (q)	Long jump	6.57 m	

== See also ==
- List of people from Yekaterinburg
- List of European Athletics Indoor Championships medalists (women)
