= Anna Nazarova =

Russian long jumper

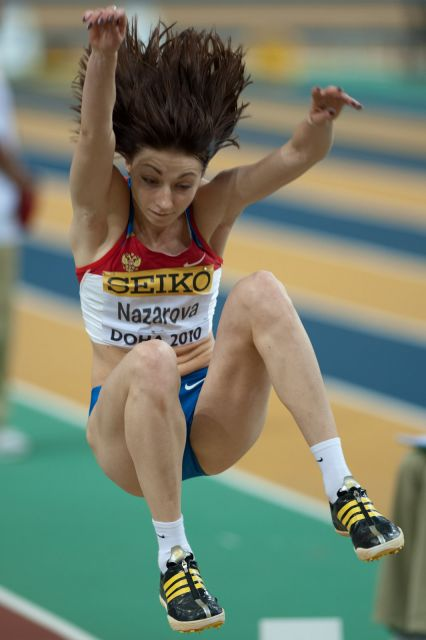
- Nazarova at the 2010 World Indoor Championships

Personal information
- Born: February 3, 1986 (age 40) Leningrad, Soviet Union
- Height: 1.72 m (5 ft 7 1/2 in)
- Weight: 58 kg (128 lb)

Sport
- Country: Russia
- Sport: Athletics
- Event: Long jump
Medal record
Universiade
Gold medal – first place	2011 Shenzhen	Long jump
European U23 Championships
Gold medal – first place	2007 Debrecen	Long jump
- Updated on 16 August 2012

Anna Sergeyevna Nazarova-Klyashtornaya (Russian: Анна Сергеевна Назарова; born 3 February 1986) is a Russian track and field athlete who competes in the long jump. A two-time Russian champion indoors, her best mark for the event is 7.11 metres. She represented Russia at the 2010 IAAF World Indoor Championships and the 2012 Summer Olympics and won gold medals at the 2007 European Athletics U23 Championships and 2011 Summer Universiade.

On 30 November 2017 she was disqualified from the 2012 Summer Olympics, as a result of a positive doping test for turinabol.

== Early life and junior athletics career ==
Born in Leningrad (now St. Petersburg), and taking up athletics at the age of 8, she began competing nationally in the long and triple jump around 2003. Her first international competition was the 2004 World Junior Championships in Athletics, where she took part in the long jump qualifying, and she won her first long jump medal (a bronze) at the 2005 European Athletics Junior Championships.

== Senior athletics career ==
Moving up to senior level, she came second at the European Champions Club Cup in 2006 and won the Russian indoor long jump title the following year, going on to represent Russia at the 2007 European Athletics Indoor Championships. That same year she won the gold medal at the 2007 European Athletics U23 Championships with a personal best jump of 6.81 m and came fifth at the 2007 Summer Universiade. She rarely competed internationally in 2008 and 2009, but managed third at the 2008 Russian Athletics Championships and was third at the 2009 Decanation competition.

Nazarova returned to the top spot domestically with a win at the Russian Indoor Championships in 2010 and she was a long jump finalist at the 2010 IAAF World Indoor Championships. Further indoor success came the following season when she jumped a personal best of 6.89 m at the Governor's Cup meet, placed second at the Russian Winter meeting and was runner-up at the Russian Championships. She was again selected for the national team, but did not make the final at the 2011 European Athletics Indoor Championships. Following an outdoor best jump of 6.88 m at the Russian Athletics Cup, she was the favourite for the long jump title at the 2011 Summer Universiade, which she comfortably won with a jump of 6.72 m ahead of second-placed Yuliya Pidluzhnaya.

At the 2014 European Championships, she finished 10th in the final, with a jump of 6.31 m.
