= List of people from Kazan =

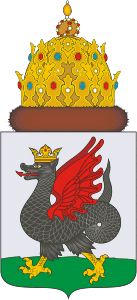
Coat of Arms of Kazan

This is a list of notable people who were born or have lived in Kazan, Russia.

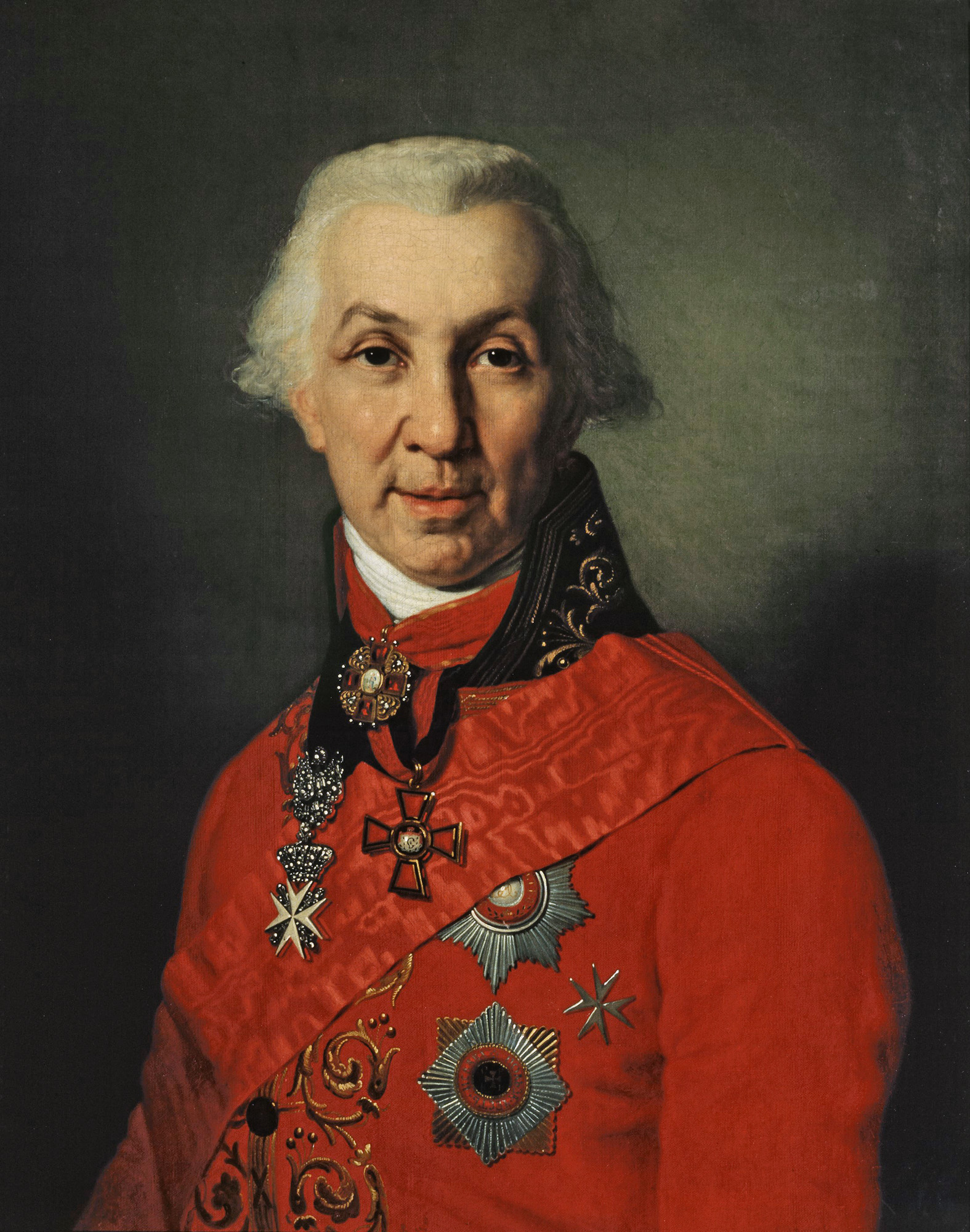
Gavrila Derzhavin (1743–1816)

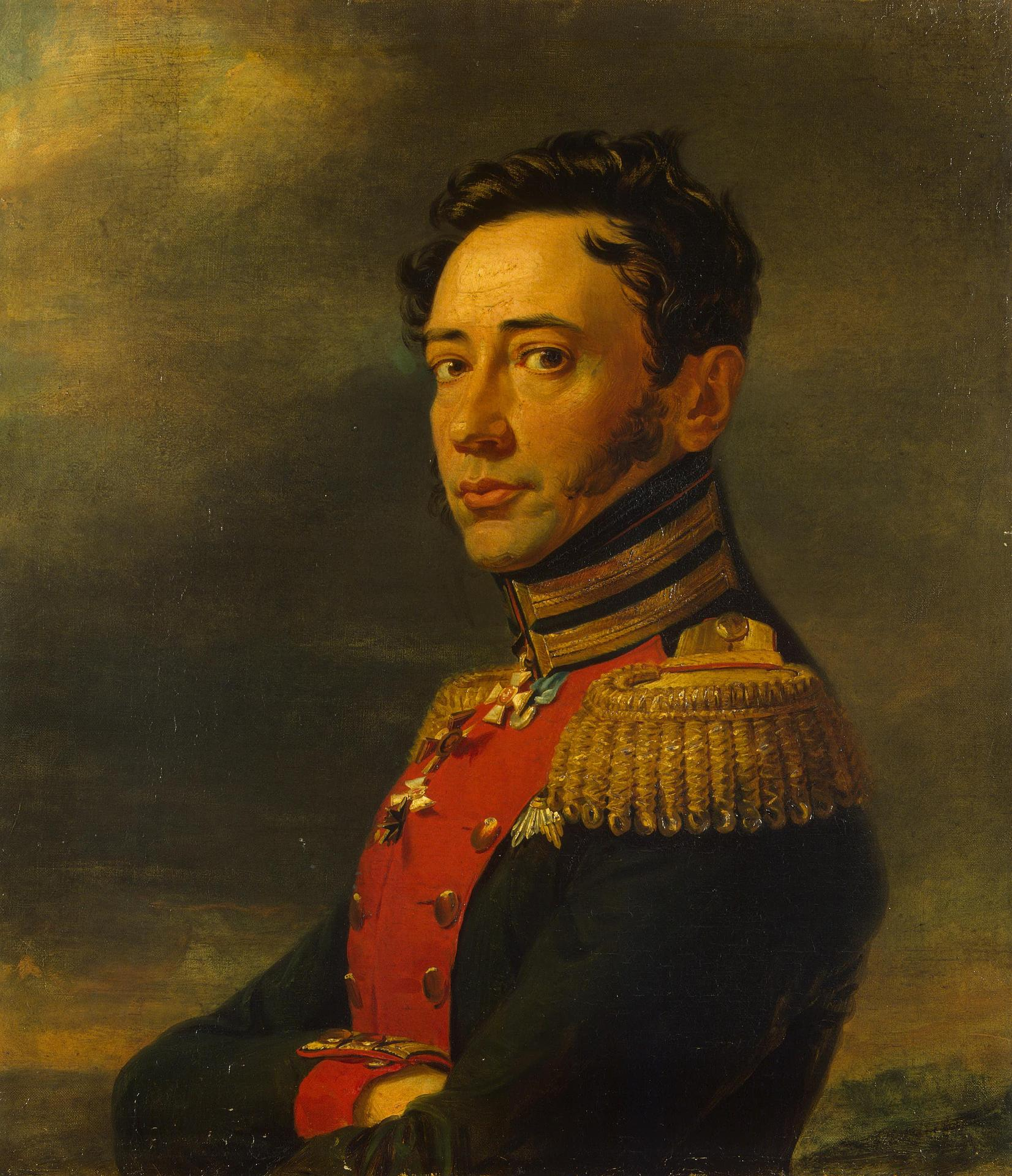
Peter Zheltukhin (1777–1829)

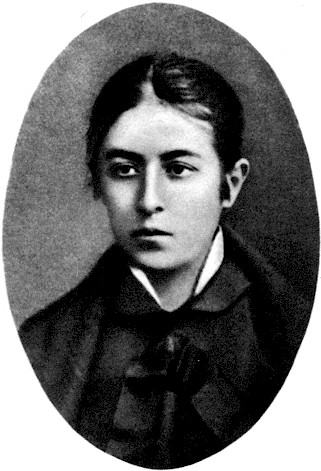
Vera Figner (1852–1942)

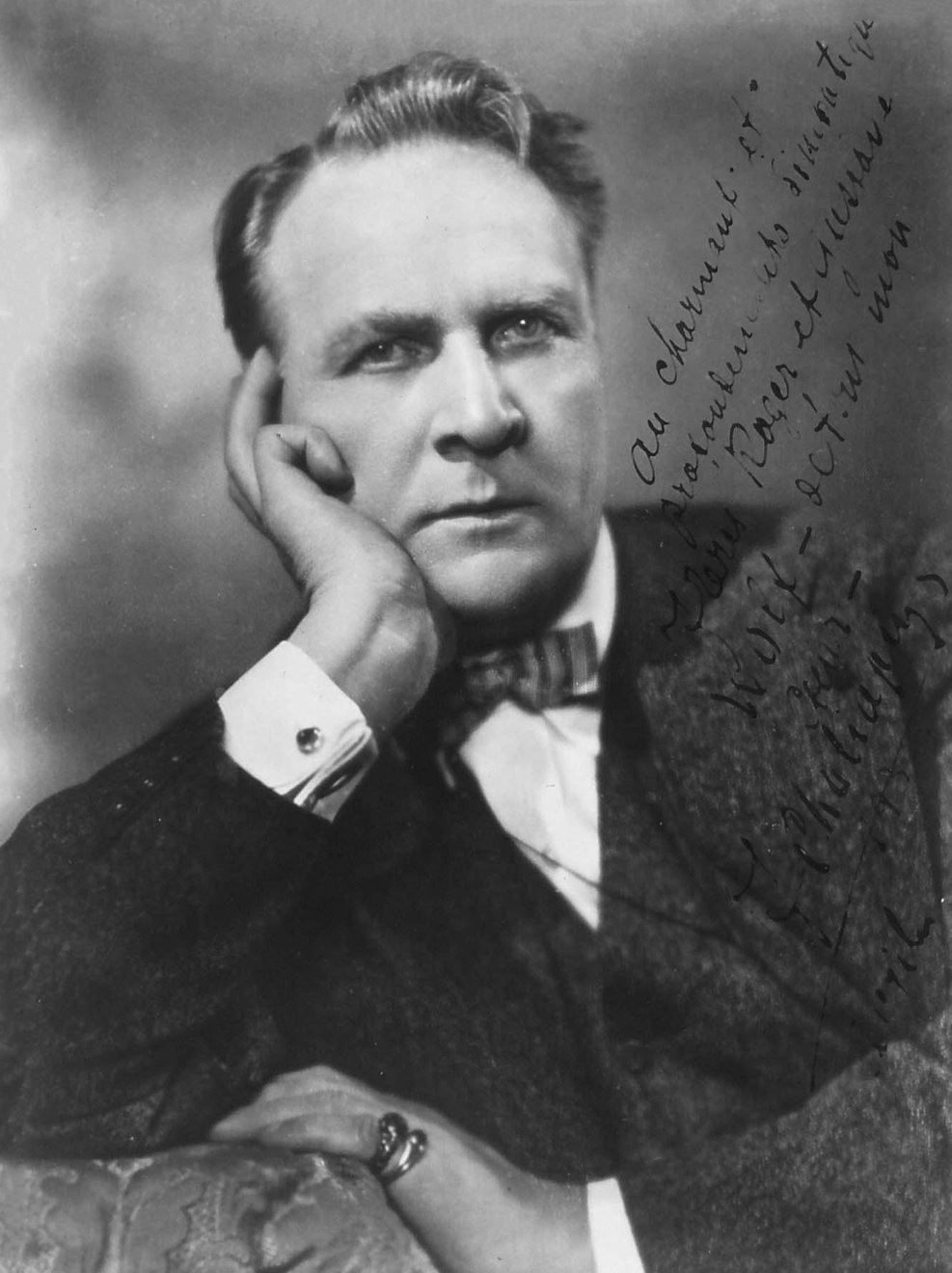
Feodor Chaliapin (1873–1938)

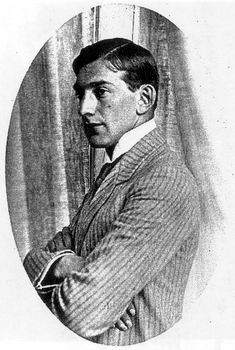
Vadim Shershenevich (1893–1942)

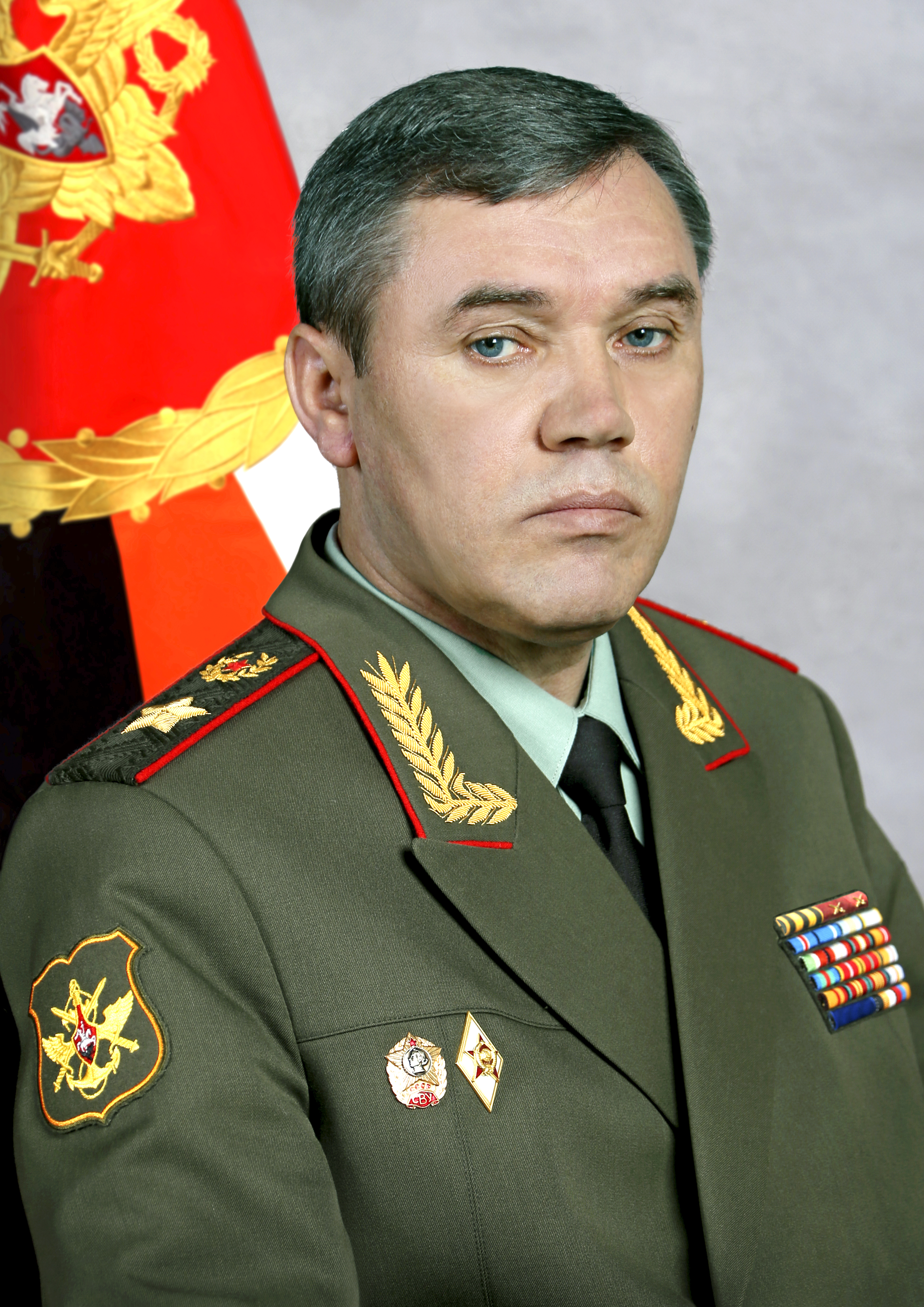
Valery Gerasimov (born 1955)

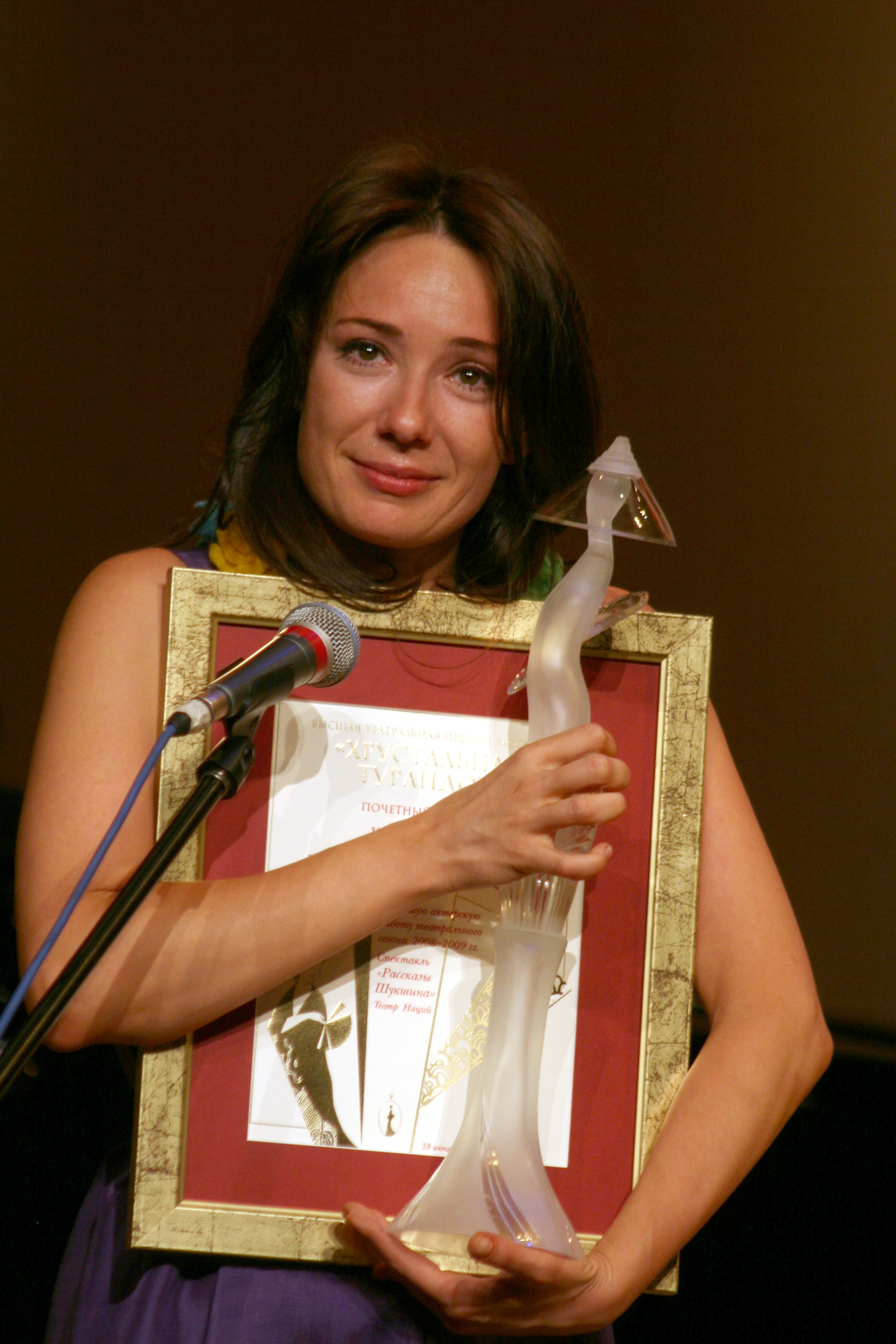
Chulpan Khamatova (born 1975)

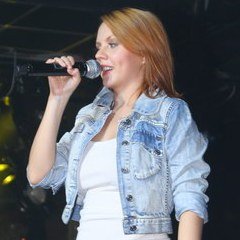
MakSim (born 1983)

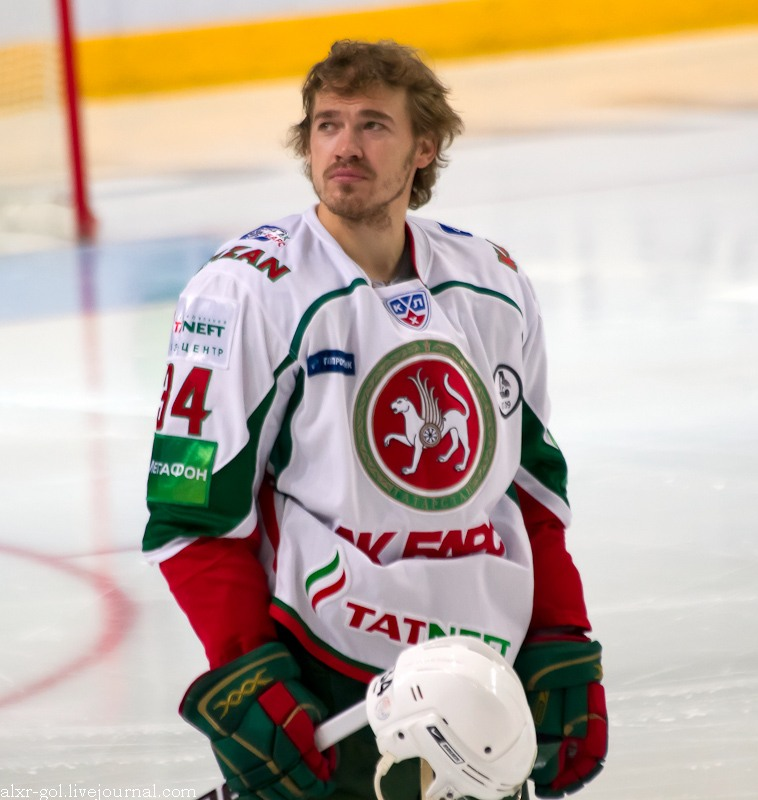
Dmitri Obukhov (born 1983)

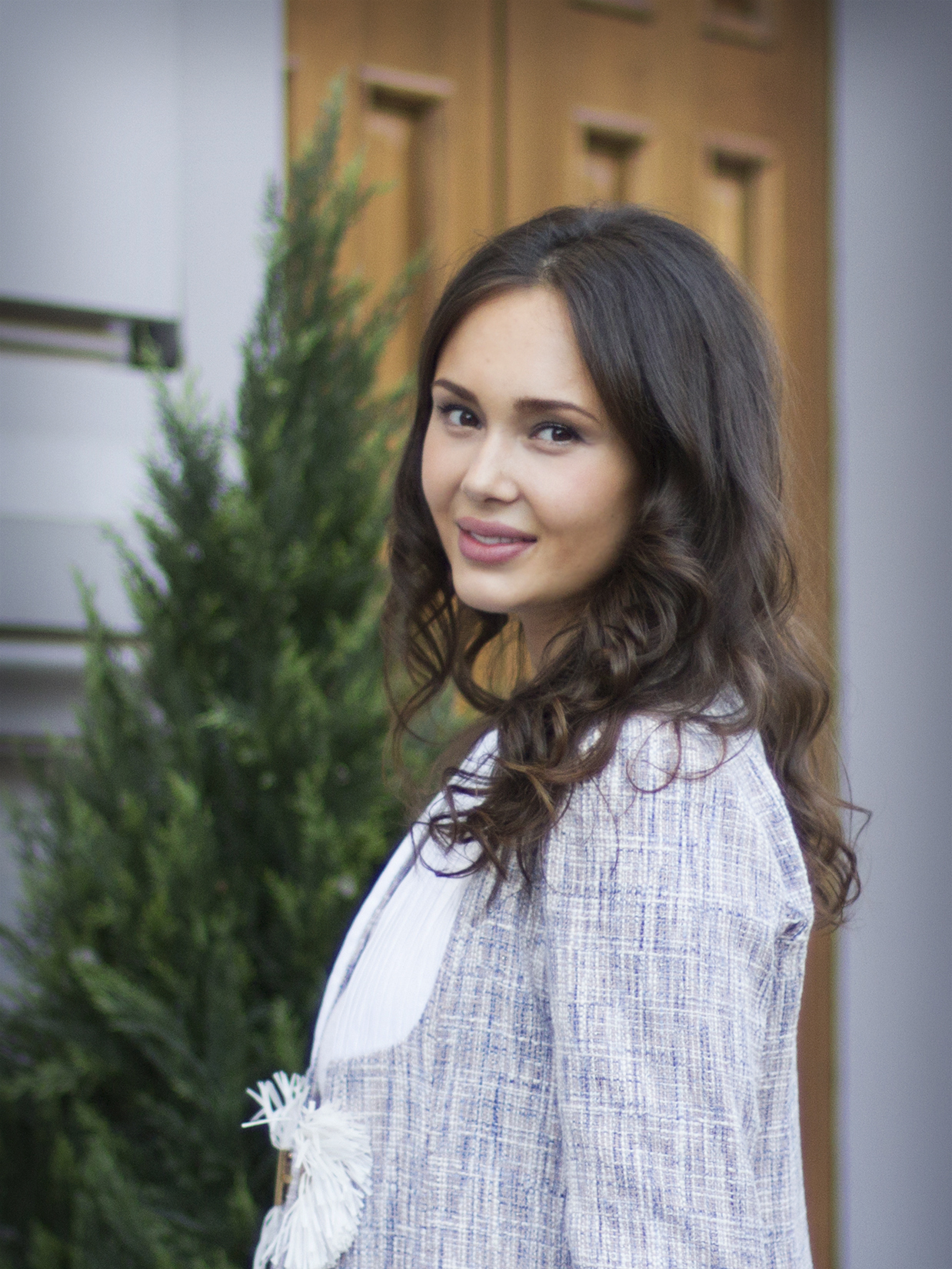
Aida Garifullina (born 1987)

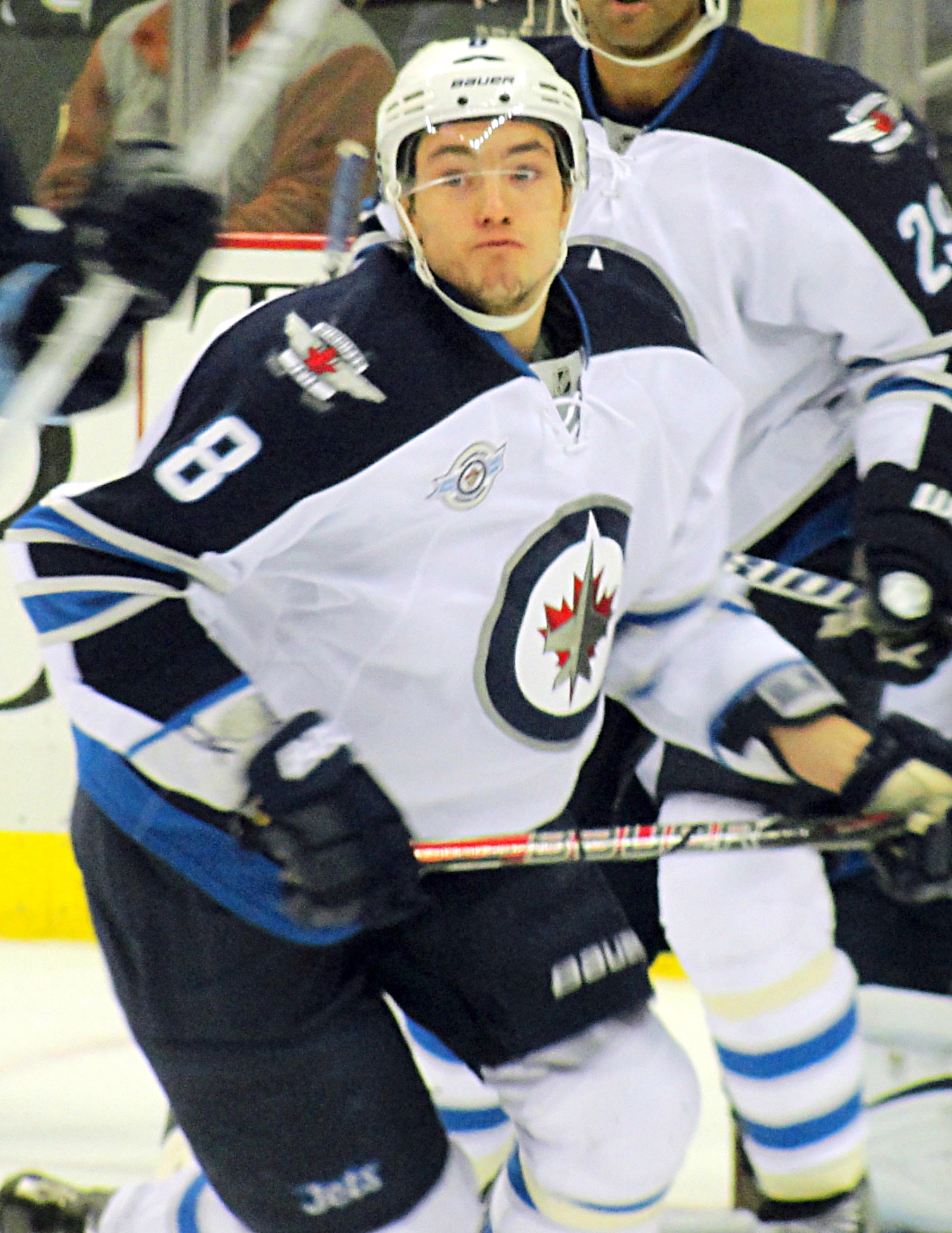
Alexander Burmistrov (born 1991)

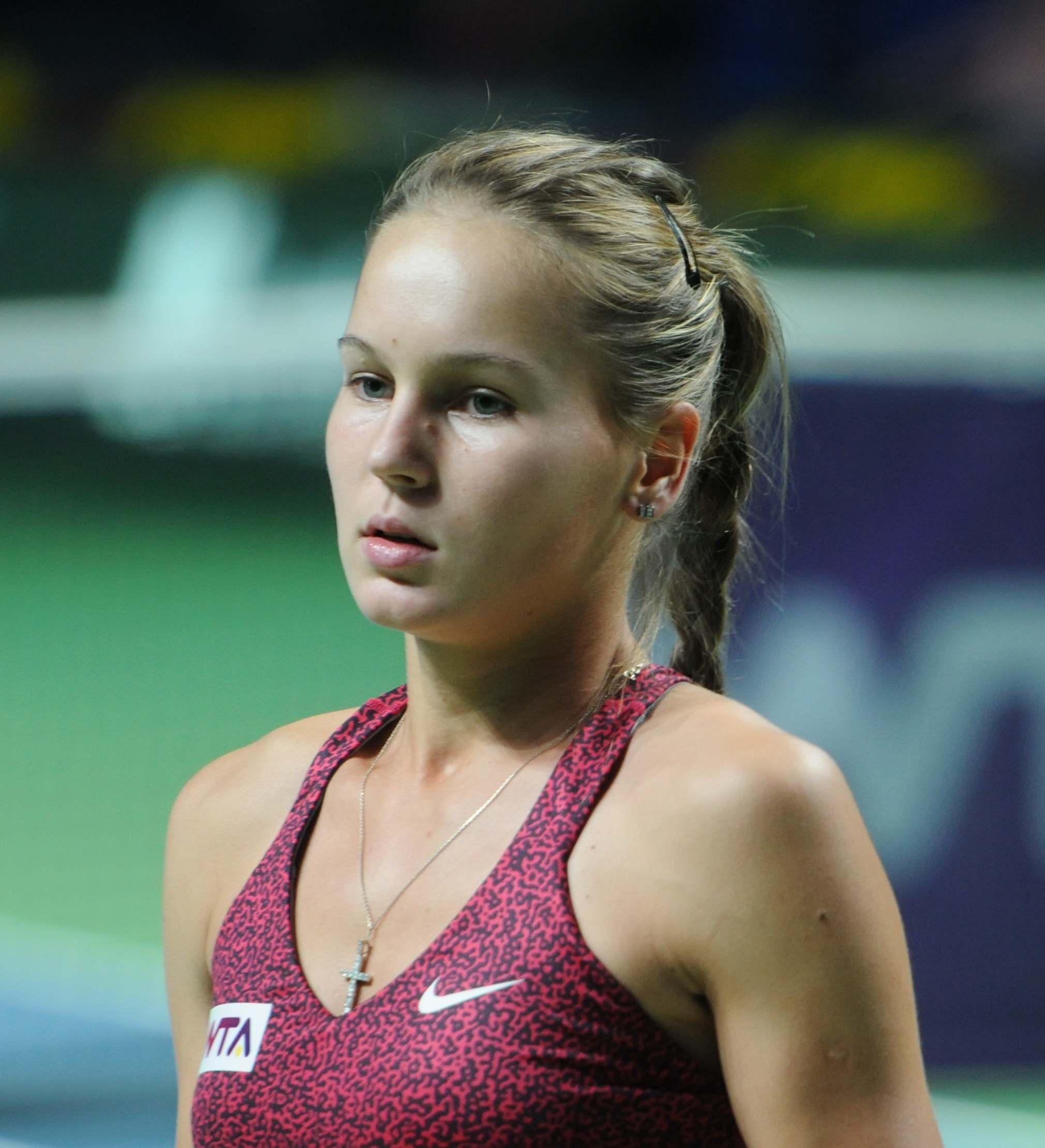
Veronika Kudermetova (born 1997)

== Born in Kazan ==
=== 1700–1799 ===
- Gavrila Derzhavin (1743–1816), Russian poet
- Gavriil Kamenev (1772–1803), Russian poet, writer and translator
- Peter Zheltukhin (1777–1829), Russian general

=== 1800–1899 ===
- Karl Ludwig Littrow (1811–1877), Austrian astronomer
- Ivan Martynov (1821–1894), Russian Jesuit priest
- Alexander Zaytsev (1841–1910), Russian chemist
- Alexander Solovtsov (1847–1923), Russian chess master
- Stepan Smolensky (1848–1909), Russian choir director and scholar of ancient
- Vera Figner (1852–1942), Russian revolutionary and narodnik
- Evgeny Chirikov (1864–1932), Russian novelist, short story writer, dramatist, essayist and publicist
- Aleksandr Kotelnikov (1865–1944), Russian mathematician
- Pyotr Pertsov (1868–1947), Russian poet, publisher, editor, literary critic, journalist and memoirist
- Nikolay Bauman (1873–1905), Russian revolutionary of the Bolshevik party
- Feodor Chaliapin (1873–1938), Russian opera singer
- Ivan Grave (1874–1960), Russian and Soviet scientist in the field of artillery
- Sergey Namyotkin (1876–1950), Russian chemist
- Vladimir Adoratsky (1878–1945), Soviet communist historian and political theorist
- Sadri Maksudi Arsal (1879–1957), Tatar and Turkish statesman, scholar and thinker
- Sergey Malov (1880–1957), Russian Turkologist
- Nicolai A. Vasiliev (1880–1940), Russian logician, philosopher, psychologist, poet
- Nicolai Fechin (1881–1955), Russian-American painter
- Aleksandr Ivanovsky (1881–1968), Russian screenwriter and film director
- Valentin Dogiel (1882–1955), Russian and Soviet zoologist, specialized in parasitology and protozoology
- Fatix Ämirxan (1886–1926), Tatar classic writer, editor and publicist
- Boris Obukhov (1891-1937), naval officer, victim of Stalin's purges, Catholic convert from Orthodoxy
- Alexander Arkhangelsky (1892–1978), aircraft designer and doctor of technical sciences
- Vadim Shershenevich (1893–1942), Russian poet
- Gala Dalí (1894–1982), Russian wife of Salvador Dalí
- Evgeny Schwartz (1896–1958), Soviet writer and playwright

=== 1900–1949 ===
- Mikhail Lavrentyev (1900–1980), Soviet mathematician and hydrodynamicist
- Alexandre Alexeieff (1901–1982), Russian artist, filmmaker and illustrator
- Alexander Kazembek (1902–1977), Russian émigré and political activist
- Alexander Luria (1902–1977), Soviet neuropsychologist and developmental psychologist
- Alexander Dubyago (1903–1959), Soviet astronomer and expert in theoretical astrophysics
- Nikolay Zabolotsky (1903–1958), Russian poet, children's writer and translator
- Aleksey Zhivotov (1904–1964), Russian composer
- Galina Kravchenko (1905–1996), Russian actress
- Sara Sadíqova (1906–1986), Soviet Tatar actress, singer and composer
- Alexander Vishnevsky (1906–1975), Soviet surgeon
- Vladimir Kotelnikov (1908–2005), Soviet information theory and radar astronomy pioneer
- Georgi Vinogradov (1908–1980), Russian tenor
- Kārlis Šteins (1911–1983), Latvian and Soviet astronomer
- Veronika Tushnóva (1911–1965), Soviet poet and member of the Soviet Union of Writers
- Yitzchok Zilber (1917–2004), Russian-born Haredi Rabbi and a leader of the Russian baal teshuva movement
- Gregory Freiman (1926–2024), Russian mathematician
- German Zonin (1926–2021), Soviet Russian football coach and player
- Amina Adil (1930–2004), Tatar writer and Islamic theologian
- Sofia Gubaidulina (1931–2025), Russian composer
- Vasily Aksyonov (1932–2009), Soviet and Russian novelist
- Mikhail Roshchin (1933–2010), Russian playwright, screenwriter and short story writer
- Albert Schwarz (born 1934), Soviet mathematician and a theoretical physicist
- Igor Vulokh (1938–2012), Russian nonconformist artist of the 1960s
- Dmitry Fuchs (born 1939), mathematician, professor at the University of California, Davis
- Valery Popov (born 1939), Russian writer
- Vladimir E. Zakharov (1939–2023), Soviet and Russian mathematician and physicist
- Aida Vedishcheva (born 1941), Soviet and Russian singer of Jewish descent
- Natalia Gutman (born 1942), Russian cellist
- Dmytro Kiva (1942–2024), Ukrainian engineer and President–General designer at Antonov
- Albert Kapengut (born 1944), Soviet chess master
- Viktor Yerin (1944–2018), Russian army general
- Gennady Yevryuzhikhin (1944–1998), Russian footballer
- Vyacheslav Bulavin (born 1946), Russian football coach and a former player
- Leonid Filatov (1946–2003), Soviet and Russian actor, director, poet, pamphleteer
- Talgat Tadzhuddin (born 1948), Chief Mufti of Russia
- Kamil Iskhakov (born 1949), Russian regional development minister's assistant of Tatar origin

=== 1950–1975 ===
- Natalia Rom (born 1950), Soviet-born operatic soprano
- Lidiya Loginova (born 1951), Soviet volleyball player
- Valentin A. Bazhanov (born 1953), Russian professor, chairperson of Philosophy Department at Ulyanovsk State University
- Nailya Gilyazova (born 1953), Soviet fencer
- Youri Egorov (1954–1988), Soviet classical pianist
- Olga Knyazeva (1954–2015), Soviet fencer
- Valery Gerasimov (born 1955), Russian General and current Chief of the General Staff of the Armed Forces of Russia
- Rustem Adagamov (born 1961), influential Russian blogger
- Sergey Mavrin (born 1963), Russian musician and composer
- Alexandre Fadeev (born 1964), Russian competitive figure skater
- Marat Khusnullin (born 1966), Russian politician
- Aleksandr Tatarkin (born 1966), Russian professional footballer
- Ildar Ibragimov (born 1967), Russian-American chess Grandmaster
- Dmitry Balmin (born 1970), Russian ice hockey defender
- Denis Kapustin (born 1970), Russian triple jumper
- Alisa Galliamova (born 1972), Russian chess player
- Anna Gourari (born 1972), Russian classical concert pianist
- Rustem Khuzin (born 1972), Russian professional football coach and a former player
- Vasily Mosin (born 1972), Russian sport shooter
- Rustem Bulatov (1974–2008), Russian professional footballer
- Maria Manakova (born 1974), Russian and Serbian chess Grandmaster
- Ruslan Nigmatullin (born 1974), Russian footballer
- Roman Shaykhutdinov (born 1974), Russian politician, Deputy Prime Minister of the Republic of Tatarstan
- Marsel Tukhvatullin (born 1974), Russian football player
- Chulpan Khamatova (born 1975), Russian film, theater and TV actress of Volga Tatar origin
- Yevgeni Varlamov (born 1975), Russian football player

=== 1976–1999 ===
- Denis Arkhipov (born 1979), Russian professional ice hockey player
- Farhad Fatkullin (born 1979), social activist and 2018 Wikimedian of the Year
- Sofya Gulyak (born 1979), Russian classical pianist
- Alexandre Dinerchtein (born 1980), professional Go player from Russia
- Maxim Sharafutdinov (born 1980), Russian journalist, television presenter of Channel One
- Svetlana Shikshina (born 1980), Russian professional Go player
- Evgeny Konstantinov (born 1981), Russian professional ice hockey goaltender
- Tatiana Kovylina (born 1981), Russian model
- Ruslan Mukhametshin (born 1981), Russian professional football player
- Nikolay Nikiforov (born 1982), Russian politician
- Ruslan Zainullin (born 1982), Russian professional ice hockey center
- MakSim (born 1983), Russian singer, songwriter and a music producer
- Dmitri Obukhov (born 1983), Russian professional ice hockey winger
- Venera Gimadieva (born 1984), Russian operatic soprano
- Ayrat Kashaev (born 1984), Russian conductor
- Marat Khairullin (born 1984), Russian-born Kazakh football attacking midfielder/forward
- Anastasiya Kolesnikova (born 1984), Russian Olympic gymnast
- Yelena Migunova (born 1984), Russian sprint athlete
- Rustem Mukhametshin (born 1984), Russian professional football player
- Eugenia Volodina (born 1984), Russian model
- Lenar Gilmullin (1985–2007), Russian football full-back of Tatar origin
- Anastasia Luppova (born 1985), Russian billiards player, the two-time European champion in Russian pyramid
- Alexander Rybakov (born 1985), Russian professional ice hockey forward
- Artyom Timofeev (born 1985), Russian chess grandmaster
- Aida Garifullina (born 1987), Russian operatic soprano
- Alsu Murtazina (born 1987), Russian triple jumper
- Kamilla Gafurzianova (born 1988), Russian female fencer
- Yana Martynova (born 1988), Russian swimmer
- Dinar Khafizullin (born 1989), Russian professional ice hockey defenceman
- Niyaz Nabeev (born 1989), Russian Nordic combined skier
- Nail Zamaliyev (born 1989), Russian professional football player
- Kirill Petrov (born 1990), Russian professional ice hockey player
- Daria Shkurikhina (born 1990), Russian group rhythmic gymnast and Olympic champion
- Alexander Burmistrov (born 1991), Russian professional ice hockey player
- Emil Garipov (born 1991), Russian professional ice hockey goaltender of Tatar descent
- Maksim Zhestokov (born 1991), Russian football defender
- Natalia Zhukova (born 1992), Russian cross-country skier
- Andrey Makarov (born 1993), Russian professional ice hockey goaltender
- Albert Yarullin (born 1993), Russian professional ice hockey defenceman
- Evgenia Tarasova (born 1994), Russian pair skater
- Elmir Nabiullin (born 1995), Russian professional football player
- Veronika Kudermetova (born 1997), Russian tennis player

=== 2000–2050 ===
- Dayana Kirillova (born 2002), Russian singer
- Kamila Valieva (born 2006), figure skater

== Lived in Kazan ==
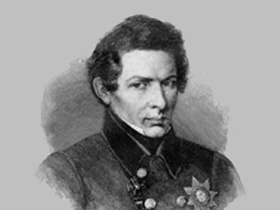
Nikolai Lobachevsky (1792–1856)

- Joseph Johann von Littrow (1781–1840), Austrian astronomer
- Nikolai Lobachevsky (1792–1856), Russian mathematician and geometer
- Ğabdulla Tuqay (1886–1913), Tatar poet
- Vladimir Lenin (1870–1924), founder and first leader of the Bolshevik Party and Soviet Union, studied at Kazan University
- Yevgeny Zavoisky (1907–1976), Soviet physicist
- Rashid Nezhmetdinov (1912–1974), Soviet chess player, International Master and 5-time winner of the Russian Chess Championship
- Viktor Kolotov (1949–2000), Soviet footballer
- Taliya Habrieva (born 1958), Russian legal writer; graduated in 1980 from the Law Faculty of Kazan State University
- Svetlana Demina (born 1961), Russian sport shooter
- Pavel Prygunov (born 1976), Russian professional footballer; made his professional debut in the Russian Second Division in 1994 for FC Rubin Kazan
