= Marcel =

Marcel may refer to:

== People ==
- Marcel (given name), people with the given name Marcel
- Marcel (footballer, born August 1981), Marcel Silva Andrade, Brazilian midfielder
- Marcel (footballer, born November 1981), Marcel Augusto Ortolan, Brazilian striker
- Marcel (footballer, born 1983), Marcel Silva Cardoso, Brazilian left back
- Marcel (footballer, born 1992), Marcel Henrique Garcia Alves Pereira, Brazilian midfielder
- Marcel (singer), American country music singer
- Étienne Marcel (died 1358), provost of merchants of Paris
- Gabriel Marcel (1889–1973), French philosopher, Christian existentialist and playwright
- Jean Marcel (died 1980), Madagascan Anglican bishop
- Jean-Jacques Marcel (1931–2014), French football player
- Rosie Marcel (born 1977), English actor
- Sylvain Marcel (born 1974), Canadian actor
- Terry Marcel (born 1942), British film director
- Claude Marcel (1793-1876), French diplomat and applied linguist
- Marcel (bishop of Die) (died 510), 5th-century bishop

== Other uses ==
- Marcel (electronics), a Bangladeshi electronic appliance brand
- Marcel (Friends), a fictional monkey in the television series
- Marcel (horse), a racehorse
- "Marcel" (song), a German entry for Eurovision 1963
- Marcel, Goa, a village in India
- "Marcel", a song by Alex Calder from Strange Dreams, 2015
- "Marcel", a 2016 song by Her's
- Marcel, a novel by Erwin Mortier

== See also ==
- Marcel wave, a hair styling technique
- Saint-Marcel (disambiguation)
- Marcell (disambiguation)
- Marsel, a given name
- Marvel (disambiguation)
- Marzel, surname
- Marcil, a surname
