= Marsel =

Marsel is a given name. Notable people with the name include:

- Marsel Çaka (born 1995), Albanian footballer
- Marsel Efroimski (born 1995), Israeli chess player
- Marsel Ibragimov (born 1997), Russian professional ice hockey player
- Marsel Idiatullin (born 1977), Uzbek professional footballer and coach
- Marsel İlhan (born 1987), Turkish professional tennis player
- Marsel Islamkulov (born 1994), Kazakhstani-Kyrgyzstani footballer
- Marsel Ismailgeci (born 2000), Albanian professional footballer
- Marsel Kararbo (born 1994), Indonesian professional footballer
- Marsel Markulin (1936–2009), Croatian gymnast
- Marsel van Oosten, Dutch photographer of nature and wildlife
- Marsel Tenter (born 1969), Romanian basketball coach
- Marsel Tukhvatullin (born 1974), Russian football player

== See also ==
- Marcel (disambiguation)
