= Guzal Sitdykowa =

Bashkir writer and Wikipedian (1952-)

- Born: Sitdikova Guzal Ramazanovna; 10 June 1952; Inzer village Beloretsky District of the Bashkir ASSR, Russian SFSR
- Citizenship: USSR, Russian Federation
- Education: Chelyabinsk State Institute of Culture
- Occupations: Poet, novelist

Guzal Ramazanovna Sitdykowa (Bashkir: Гүзәл Рамаҙан ҡыҙы Ситдиҡова, romanized: Güzäl Ramaźan qıźı Sitdiqova, Russian: Гузаль Рамазановна Ситдыкова) is a Bashkir writer, poet, publicist and translator. She is a member of the Union of Writers of Russia and the Union of Writers of Bashkortostan. She was the leader of the Society of Bashkir Women of the Republic Bashkortostan from 2004 until 2011. Since 2012, she participates in the international volunteer movement Wikimedia.

== Biography ==
Sitdykowa (Sitdykowa) Guzal Ramazanovna was born on 10 June 1952, in the Inzer village Beloretsky District of the Bashkir ASSR in Russia. In 1967, after graduating from an eight-year school, she entered the Beloretsk Pedagogical School. Since 1971, she worked as a tutor at boarding school No. 1, then in various educational institutions in the city of Beloretsk.

In 1980, she graduated from the library department of the Chelyabinsk State Institute of Culture. Since 1983 she was an employee, since 1986 - head of the department, and since 1987 - deputy editor of the Beloretsk regional newspaper "Ural". Since 1983, she worked in the regional newspaper "Ural".

From 1989 to 1995, she was the editor-in-chief of the regional newspaper Ural of the Beloretsky district. At the same time, she was elected a People's Deputy of the Supreme Council of the Bashkir ASSR of the XII convocation (1991-1995).

From 1995-2008, she was a deputy of the State Assembly of the Republic of Bashkortostan I-III convocations, and a member of the Public Chamber of the Republic of Bashkortostan I convocation (2011-2012). From 2004-2011 she was elected chairman of the Society of Bashkir Women of the Republic of Bashkortostan. Took part in the work of the Executive Committee of The World Qoroltai of the Bashkirs.

In 2002, she was awarded the Honor Diploma of the Republic of Bashkortostan.

== Creative activity ==
Sitdykowa has been publishing her writings since 1976. While working in the regional newspaper "Ural" her works were published in the republican press. The first collection of her poems was published in the almanac "Йәш көстәр" (Young Forces) in 1984. She is the author of 11 books and about twenty scientific publications.

She participates in the movement of Wikimedia as one of the editors-volunteers, regularly creating and editing articles of the Bashkir Wikipedia, as well as pages of the Bashkir Wikimedia projects of Wikisource and Wiktionary.

Sitdykowa is fond of poetry and translations from foreign languages into the Bashkir language. Her works have been translated into Russian.

Since 1995, she is a member of the Union of Writers of the Republic of Bashkortostan, she works in different literary genres - poetry, prose, essay, and children's literature.

She is one of the creators of Wikigrannies Wikimedia user group.
