= Marcel (given name) =

Marcel (French: [maʁsɛl], Occitan: [maɾˈsɛl], Catalan: [məɾˈsɛl, maɾˈsɛl], Romanian: [marˈtʃel]) is an Occitan form of the Ancient Roman origin male given name Marcellus, which in Latin means "Belonging to Mars". The feminine counterpart of the name is Marcelle. It is used predominantly in France, Monaco, Catalonia, Belgium, Switzerland, Germany, Austria, Hungary, Canada and partially in Poland and Romania. Similar sounding male form "Marcel" (Tatar, Bashkir: Марсел) is very distributed also in Tatarstan and Bashkiria since the middle of the 20th century, but has nothing to do with the Latin origin name Marcel.

== In the arts ==
- Marcel (singer) (Marcel Francois Chagnon) (born 1975), American country music singer and songwriter known by the singular name, Marcel
- Marcel Achard (1899–1974), French playwright and screenwriter
- Marcel Alcalá (born 1990) American artist
- Marcel Aymé (1902–1967), French author, screenwriter and playwright
- Marcel Breuer (1902–1981), Hungarian-born American modernist, architect and furniture designer
- Marcel Broodthaers (1924–1976), Belgian poet, artist and filmmaker
- Marcel Camus (1912–1982), French film director
- Marcel Carné (1906–1996), French film director
- Marcel Cuvelier (1924–2015), French actor
- Marcel Dadi (1951–1996), French guitarist and songwriter
- Marcel Duchamp (1887–1968), French-American artist whose work is most often associated with the Dadaist and Surrealist movements
- Marcel Dupré (1886–1971), French organist, pianist, composer and pedagogue
- Marcel Dzama (born 1974), Canadian artist known for small-scale ink and watercolor drawings
- Marcel Everett (born 1995), American electronic musician better known as XXYYXX
- Marcel Gotlib (1934–2016), French comics artist
- Marcel Iureș (born 1951), Romanian actor
- Marcel Janco (1895–1984), Israeli painter and architect
- Marcel Jouhandeau (1888–1979), French writer
- Marcel Journet (actor) (1895–1973), French film and stage actor
- Marcel Khalife (born 1950), Lebanese-French composer, singer and oud player
- Marcel L'Herbier (1888–1979), French filmmaker
- Marcel Marceau (1923–2007), French mime artist and actor
- Marcel Martí (1925–2010), Argentine-born sculptor of Catalan descent
- Marcel Moyse (1889–1984), French flutist
- Marcel Mule (1901–2001), French classical saxophonist
- Marcel Neels (1922–2016), Belgian cartoonist known as "Marc Sleen"
- Marcel Olinescu (1896–1992), Romanian engraver
- Marcel Ophuls (1927–2025), German-French documentary film maker and actor
- Marcel Pagnol (1895–1975), French novelist, playwright and filmmaker
- Marcel Poot (1901–1988), Belgian composer and music educator
- Marcel Proust (1871–1922), French novelist, essayist, and critic
- Marcel Rodríguez-López (born 1984), member of The Mars Volta and younger brother of Omar Rodriguez-Lopez
- Marcel Romanescu (1897–1956), Romanian poet
- Marcel Schwob (1867–1905), Jewish French symbolist writer
- Marcel Simon (actor) (1872–1958), Belgian actor
- Marcel Theo Hall (1964–2021), American rapper better known by his stage name Biz Markie
- Marcel Vaid (born 1967), Swiss film composer

== In sports ==
- Marcel "Marco" van Basten (born 1964), Dutch football player and coach
- Marcel (footballer, born 1983), Marcel Silva Cardoso, Brazilian left back
- Marcel (footballer, born 1992), Marcel Henrique Garcia Alves Pereira, Brazilian midfielder
- Marcel (footballer, born August 1981), Marcel Silva Andrade, Brazilian midfielder
- Marcel (footballer, born November 1981), Marcel Augusto Ortolan, Brazilian striker
- Marcel Augusto Ortolan, Brazilian football player
- Marcel Balkestein (born 1981), Dutch field hockey player
- Marcel Barthel (born 1990), German professional wrestler known by his ring name Ludwig Kaiser
- Marcel Braithwaite (born 1994), English professional boxer
- Marcel Buysse (1889–1939), Belgian racing cyclist
- Marcel Cerdan (1916–1949), French pied noir world boxing champion
- Marcel Comeau (born 1952), Canadian ice hockey coach and NHL executive
- Marcel Coraș (born 1959), Romanian footballer
- Marcel Desailly (born 1968), French footballer
- Marcel Dionne (born 1931), Canadian ice hockey player
- Marcel Dost (born 1969), retired decathlete from the Netherlands
- Marcel Felder (born 1984), Uruguayan tennis player
- Marcel Goc (born 1983), German professional ice hockey player
- Marcel Granollers (born 1986), Spanish tennis player
- Marcel Henrique Garcia Alves Pereira (born 1992), Brazilian footballer known as Marcel
- Marcel Hirscher (born 1989), Austrian alpine skier
- Marcel Hossa (born 1981), Slovak professional ice hockey player
- Marcel Keßen (born 1997), German basketball player
- Marcel Kint (1914–2002), Belgian racing cyclist
- Marcel Kittel (born 1988), German racing cyclist
- Marcel Latak (born 2009), American tennis player
- Marcel Nguyen (born 1987), Vietnamese-German gymnast
- Marcel Ponitka (born 1997), Polish basketball player
- Marcel Reed, American football player
- Marcel Sabitzer (born 1994), Austrian footballer
- Marcel Schäfer (born 1984), German footballer
- Marcel Schmelzer (born 1988), German footballer
- Marcel Seip (born 1982), Dutch footballer
- Marcel Spears Jr. (born 1997), American football player
- Marcel Toader (1963–2019), Romanian rugby union player
- Marcel Wouda (born 1972), Dutch swimmer
- Marcel Wyss (born 1986), Swiss road cyclist
- Marcell Dareus (born 1990), NFL defensive tackle
- Marcell Jansen (born 1985), German footballer
- Marcel Eckardt (born 1989), German snooker referee

== In other fields ==
- Marcel Alessandri (1895–1968), French Army general
- Marcel Barrère (1920–1996), French rocket scientist
- Marcel Alexandre Bertrand (1847–1907), French geologist
- Marcel Bauer (born 1992), German politician
- Marcel Berlins (1941–2019), Anglo-French lawyer, legal commentator, broadcaster, and columnist
- Marcel Bich (1914–1994), French manufacturer of ballpoint pens
- Marcel Bigeard (1916–2010), French Army general
- Marcel Bouyer (1920–2000), French politician
- Marcel Cachin (1869–1958), Breton politician, director of the communist newspaper L'Humanité
- Marcel Carpentier (1895–1977), French Army general
- Marcel Ciolacu (born 1967), Romanian politician
- Marcel Claude (born 1957), Chilean economist and political activist
- Marcel Dassault (1892–1986), French aircraft industrialist
- Marcel Déat (1894–1955), French socialist turned fascist politician
- Marcel Deprez (1843–1918), French electrical engineer
- Marcel Desjardins (1941–2003), Canadian journalist, news editor, and director
- Marcel Deviq (1907–1972), French engineer, businessman, and politician
- Marcel Dinu (born 1935), Romanian diplomat
- Marcel Douzima (1926–2012), Central African teacher and politician
- Marcel Grateau (1852–1936), French hairdresser who pioneered the use of hair irons
- Marcel Griaule (1898–1956), French anthropologist
- Marcel Grossmann (1878–1936), Hungarian-Swiss mathematician
- Marcel Gumbs (born 1953), Dutch Prime Minister of Sint Maarten
- Marcel Ichac (1906–1994), French alpinist, explorer, photographer, and film director
- Marcel Lefebvre (1905–1991), French Roman Catholic archbishop
- Marcel Machill (born 1968), German journalist and politician
- Marcel Mason (born 1959), Canadian blogger and political activist
- Marcel Mauss (1872–1950), French ethnologist
- Marcel Minnaert (1893–1970), Dutch astronomer of Flemish origin
- Marcel Olteanu (1872–1943), Romanian general
- Marcel Pauker (1896–1938), Romanian communist militant
- Marcel Peyrouton (1887–1983), French diplomat and politician.
- Marcel Pilet-Golaz (1889–1958), Swiss politician
- Marcel Queckemeyer (born 1980), German politician
- Marcel Rayman (1923−1944), Polish Jew in the FTP-MOI group of French resistance fighters during World War II
- Marcel Reich-Ranicki (1920–2013), Polish-born German literary critic
- Marcel Renault (1871 or 1872–1903), French racing car driver and industrialist
- Marcel Riesz (1886–1969), Hungarian-born Swedish mathematician
- Marcel Scharrelmann (born 1982), German politician
- Marcel Schwerzmann (born 1965), Swiss politician
- Marcel Toussaint Terfve (1893–1918), Belgian corporal
- Marcel Trillat (1940–2020), French journalist and documentary filmmaker
- Marcel Vigneron (born 1980), American chef and television personality
- Marcel Vonk, Dutch poker player and physicist
- Marcel Vos, Dutch YouTuber

== In fiction ==
- Marcel Galliard, a character in the Attack on Titan manga and anime.
- Marcel Gerard, a character in The Originals
- Marcel, a fictional marketer in the music video of "Best Song Ever" by One Direction
- Marcel, a one inch tall shell that stars in the 2010 YouTube series of short films Marcel the Shell with Shoes On (short film series) and 2021 feature-length film Marcel the Shell with Shoes On (2021 film)
- Marcel, a villager in the video game series Animal Crossing
- Marcel, a villain in the anime Yu-Gi-Oh! GX
- Marcel, Ross Geller's pet monkey in the television series Friends
