= Alexander Rybakov =

Alexander Rybakov may refer to:

- Alexander Rybakov (ice hockey) (born 1985), Russian ice hockey forward
- Alexander Rybakov (cyclist) (born 1988), Russian cyclist
