= Ektov =

Ektov (Russian: Эктов) is a Russian masculine surname; its feminine counterpart is Ektova (Russian: Эктова). Notable people with one of these surnames include:

- Aleksandr Ektov (born 1996), Russian footballer
- Irina Ektova (born 1987), Kazakhstani triple jumper, wife of Yevgeniy
- Yekaterina Ektova (born 1992), Kazakhstani triple jumper
- Yevgeniy Ektov (born 1986), Kazakhstani triple jumper, husband of Irina
