= Marcelle =

Marcelle may refer to:

== Given name ==
- Marcelle Auclair (1899–1983), French novelist, biographer, journalist and poet
- Marcelle Arnold (1917–2010), French film, stage and television actress
- Marcelle Barthe (1904–1964), Canadian radio personality and writer.
- Marcelle Baud (1890-1987), French Egyptologist and artist
- Marcelle Bergerol (née Cahen) (1901-1989), post-impressionist French painter
- Marcelle Bittar (born 1981), Brazilian model
- Marcelle Bory (1908–1929), French fencer, competed in the individual women's foil competition at the 1924 Summer Olympics
- Marcelle Bühler (1913–2002), Swiss alpine skier who competed in the 1936 Winter Olympics.
- Marcelle Cahn (1895-1981), French painter, member of Abstraction-Création
- Marcelle Capy (pseudonym of Marcelle Marquès) (1891–1962), French novelist, journalist, feminist and militant pacifist
- Marcelle Choisnet (1914–1974), French aviator, the first woman to be awarded the Lilienthal medal
- Marcelle Chantal (1901–1960), French stage and film actress
- Marcelle Chaumont (1891-1990), French fashion designer
- Marcelle Corday (1890–1971), Belgian-born American actress
- Marcelle Corneille (1923–2019), Canadian administrator and educator in music education
- Marcelle Demougeot (1876–1931), French soprano
- Marcelle Derrien (1916–2008), French stage and film actress
- Marcelle Deschênes (born 1939), Canadian multi-media artist, music educator and composer of electroacoustic music
- Marcelle Devaud (1908–2008), French politician
- Marcelle Dormoy (1895–1976), French couture fashion designer active from the 1910s to 1950
- Marcelle Engelen Faber (1923–2023), French Resistant
- Marcelle Ferron (1924–2001), Canadian Québécoise painter and stained glass artist
- Marcelle Gabarrus (born 1929), French sprinter
- Marcelle Géniat (1881-1959), French film actress.
- Marcelle Lively Hamer (1900–1974), American librarian and folklorist
- Marcelle Henry (1895–1945), French civil servant, member of the French Resistance during the Second World War
- Anne-Marcelle Kahn (1896–1965) first French woman engineer to graduate from l'École nationale supérieure des mines de Saint-Étienne
- Marcelle Karp, a.k.a. Betty Boob, (born 1964), American feminist writer, editor, and television director and producer
- Marcelle Kellermann (c.1919–2015), French writer and teacher, member of French Resistance during Second World War
- Marcelle Lafont (1905-1982), chemist, chemical engineer, member of the French Resistance and later a politician
- Marcelle Lagesse (1916–2011), Mauritian journalist and writer
- Marcelle Laloë (1884–1974), French wife of Emperor Hàm Nghi of the Nguyễn dynasty of Vietnam
- Marcelle Lalou (1890–1967), 20th-century French Tibetologist
- Marcelle Lapicque (1873–1960), French neurophysiologist
- Marcelle Larguier, Malagasy political figure, second First Lady of Madagascar from 1972 to 1975 during presidency of her husband
- Marcelle Leblanc, American film and television actress
- Marcelle Lender (1862–1926), French singer, dancer and entertainer made famous in paintings by Henri de Toulouse-Lautrec
- Marie-Anne-Marcelle Mallet (1805–1871), Roman Catholic nun and founder of the Sisters of Charity of Quebec
- Marcelle de Manziarly (1899–1989), French pianist, music educator, conductor and composer.
- Marcelle Manson (b. 1984), former water polo player and field hockey player from South Africa
- Marcelle Maurette (1903–1972), French playwright and screenwriter
- Marcelle Mercenier (1920–1996), Belgian pianist and teacher
- Marcelle Meredith, National Council of Societies for the Prevention of Cruelty to Animals (NSPCA)
- Marcelle Mersereau, (born 1942), Canadian politician
- Marcelle Neveu (1906–1993), French middle-distance runner, competed in women's 800 metres at 1928 Summer Olympics
- Marcelle Meyer (1897–1958), French pianist
- Marcelle Narbonne (1898–2012), at the time of her death, the oldest living person in France and Europe.
- Marcelle Ninio (1929–2019), Egyptian secretary and Israeli spy in involved in the Lavon affair
- Marcelle Ranson-Hervé (1929–2020), French actress
- Marcelle Rumeau (1912–1985), French politician
- Marcelle Tassencourt (1914–2001), French actress and theatre director
- Marcelle Tiard (1861-1932), French Esperantist
- Marcelle Tinayre (1870–1948), French woman of letters
- Marcelle Parkes (born 1997), New Zealand rugby union player
- Marcelle Pradot (1901–1982), French actress who worked principally in silent films
- Marcelle Praince (9 June 1882–1969), French actress
- Marcelle Romée (1903–1932), French actress
- Marcelle Wahba, American former diplomat, president emeritus of the Arab Gulf States Institute in Washington

== Surname ==
- Cinthia Marcelle (b. 1974), Brazilian artist
- Clint Marcelle (b. 1968), Trinidadian former professional footballer and coach
- Édouard Marcelle (1909–2001), French rower who won a silver medal in the coxed pairs at the 1928 Summer Olympics
- Kareem Marcelle (born 1995), Trinidadian politician
- Oliver Marcell (1895–1949), nicknamed "Ghost", American third baseman in the Negro leagues
- Shanice Marcelle (born 1990), Canadian female volleyball player and assistant coach
- Thomas Marcelle (b. 1962), American attorney and judge.

== Other ==
- 1300 Marcelle (1934 CL), a main-belt asteroid
- Marcelle (musical), 1908 Broadway musical

== See also ==
- Marcel (disambiguation)
- Marcell (disambiguation)
