= Marcil =

Marcil is a surname. Notable people with the surname include:

- Brian Marcil (born 1948), Canadian football player
- Champlain Marcil (1920–2010), Canadian photojournalist
- Charles Marcil (1860–1937), Canadian politician
- Chris Marcil, American television writer and producer
- Claude Marcil (born 1964), Canadian fencer
- Serge Marcil (1944–2010), Canadian educator and politician
- Simon Marcil, Canadian politician
- Vanessa Marcil (born 1968), American actress
- William C. Marcil (born 1936), American media executive

== See also ==
- Marcel as a surname
- Marzel, a surname
