= Society of Bashkir Women of the Republic Bashkortostan (Russia) =

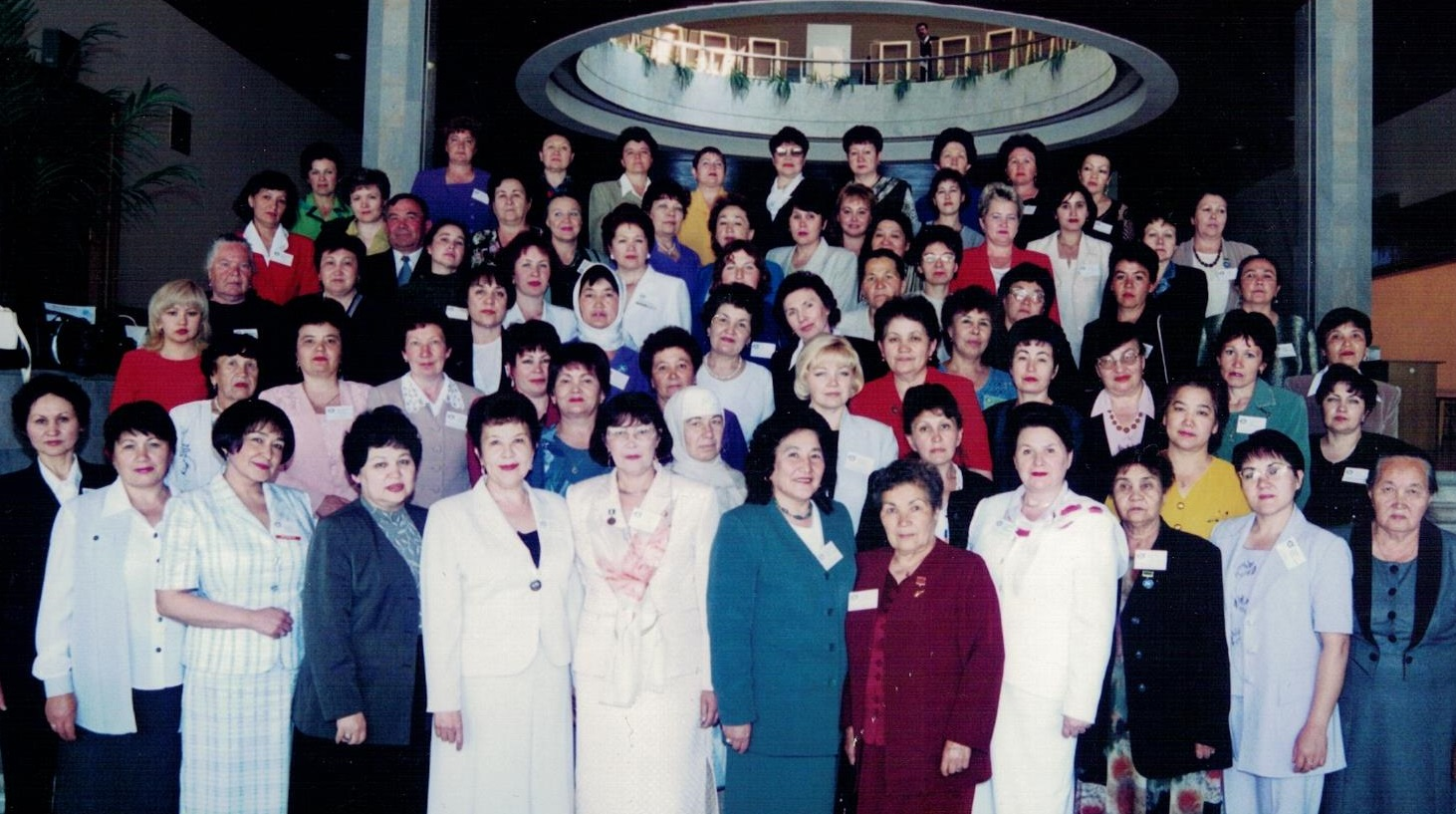
Female delegates of the Second World Kurultai of the Bashkir People

The Society of Bashkir Women of the Republic Bashkortostan (Bashkir: Башҡортостан Республикаһының Башҡорт ҡатын-ҡыҙҙары йәмғиәте) is a non-governmental organization established to enhance the status of women in society, its role in the socio-political, economic, social and cultural life of the republic, family strengthening, preservation and development culture and language of Bashkirs, folk traditions and crafts.

The headquarters is located in Bashkortostan in the city of Ufa.

== General characteristics ==
The public organization "Society of Bashkir Women of the Republic of Bashkortostan" was established in Ufa at the Constituent Assembly on November 17, 1990.

As of 2007, there were 30 members in the Bashkir Women's Board.

The organization actively participates in various social events, such as the Days of Bashkortostan regions and cities, national holidays, competitions, scientific and practical conferences, charitable assistance to orphanages, promotion of healthy lifestyles and others.

The Bashkir Women's Society is one of the organizers of republican and regional competitions, such as "Model Young Family", "Beauty Contest", "Bashkir National Costume", contest of Bashkir poets-storytellers, "Best Mother"; holidays "Meeting of fellow villagers", "Genealogical tree", "Song of a lullaby" and others.

The Bashkir Women's Society is a member of the Union of Women of Bashkortostan, The World Qoroltai of the Bashkirs. The Society cooperates with the Interregional Women's Public Organization to promote the preservation of the traditions of the Turkic-speaking peoples, the World Association of Women of the Turkic World, the public organization "Ak Tirma" and others.
