= Athletics at the 2013 Summer Universiade – Women's triple jump =

Sports event

The women's triple jump event at the 2013 Summer Universiade was held on 9–10 July.

== Medalists ==
Gold	Silver	Bronze
Ekaterina Koneva; Russia	Anna Jagaciak; Poland	Carmen Toma; Romania

== Results ==
=== Qualification ===
Qualification: 13.90 m (Q) or at least 12 best (q) qualified for the final.

Rank	Group	Athlete	Nationality	#1	#2	#3	Result	Notes
1	B	Ekaterina Koneva	Russia	14.47			14.47	Q
2	A	Carmen Toma	Romania	x	x	13.71	13.71	q
3	B	Anna Jagaciak	Poland	13.22	x	13.70	13.70	q
4	A	Shaneika Thomas	Jamaica	13.19	13.36	13.58	13.58	q
5	B	Noor Amira Binti Nafiah	Malaysia	13.22	13.41	x	13.41	q, SB
6	B	Irina Ektova	Kazakhstan	x	x	13.37	13.37	q
7	B	Elina Torro	Finland	13.30	13.22	12.97	13.30	q
8	A	Alsu Murtazina	Russia	13.20	13.06	13.05	13.20	q
9	A	Ekaterina Ektova	Kazakhstan	13.13	x	x	13.13	q
10	A	Sevim Sinmez Serbest	Turkey	12.87	13.07	13.06	13.07	q
11	B	Māra Grīva	Latvia	x	13.00	12.72	13.00	q
12	A	Ellen Pettitt	Australia	12.42	12.78	12.17	12.78	q
13	A	Sheena Varkey	India	12.55	12.52	12.37	12.55	
14	B	Ivonne Rangel	Mexico	12.47	x	x	12.47	
15	A	Anna Makarova	Estonia	x	12.29	12.08	12.29	
16	B	Allison Outerbridge	Bermuda	x	11.75	12.04	12.04	PB
17	A	Rebecca Sare	Malta	11.48	11.73	12.01	12.01	PB
18	B	Irma Betancourth	Colombia	x	11.41	11.14	11.41	
	A	Milika Tuivanuavou	Fiji	x	x	x	NM	
	B	Nighat Kausar	Pakistan	x	x	x	NM	
	B	Ikabongo Ikabongo	Zambia				DNS	

=== Final ===
Rank	Athlete	Nationality	#1	#2	#3	#4	#5	#6	Result	Notes
1st place, gold medalist(s)	Ekaterina Koneva	Russia	14.39	14.59	14.03	14.72	14.82	14.58	14.82	UR
2nd place, silver medalist(s)	Anna Jagaciak	Poland	13.75	13.50	x	14.03	14.21	14.04	14.21	SB
3rd place, bronze medalist(s)	Carmen Toma	Romania	13.87	13.93	13.89	x	13.95	14.14	14.14	SB
4	Irina Ektova	Kazakhstan	13.84	13.87	13.78	13.51	14.13	x	14.13	SB
5	Alsu Murtazina	Russia	13.91	13.62	13.89	13.69	x	x	13.91	
6	Shanieka Thomas	Jamaica	13.53	13.10	13.20	13.47	13.37	13.22	13.53	
7	Noor Amira Binti Nafiah	Malaysia	x	13.43	13.21	x	13.08	x	13.43	SB
8	Elina Torro	Finland	13.25	13.33	x	x	13.34	13.32	13.34	
9	Sevim Sinmez Serbest	Turkey	13.31	11.44	13.00				13.31	
10	Ekaterina Ektova	Kazakhstan	12.75	12.92	13.05				13.05	
11	Ellen Pettitt	Australia	x	13.04	12.90				13.04	
12	Māra Grīva	Latvia	12.77	x	12.74				12.77	
