= Wikigrannies =

Wikimedia user group

WikiGrannies User Group logo

Wikigrannies (Bashkir: вики-өләсәйҙәр, Russian: вики-бабушки) is a group of Wikipedia authors and Wikimedians of elderly age, partly organized as a Wikimedia user group. As a user group, they originate from Bashkortostan, and tend to include participants and colleagues from other regions and countries.

== History ==
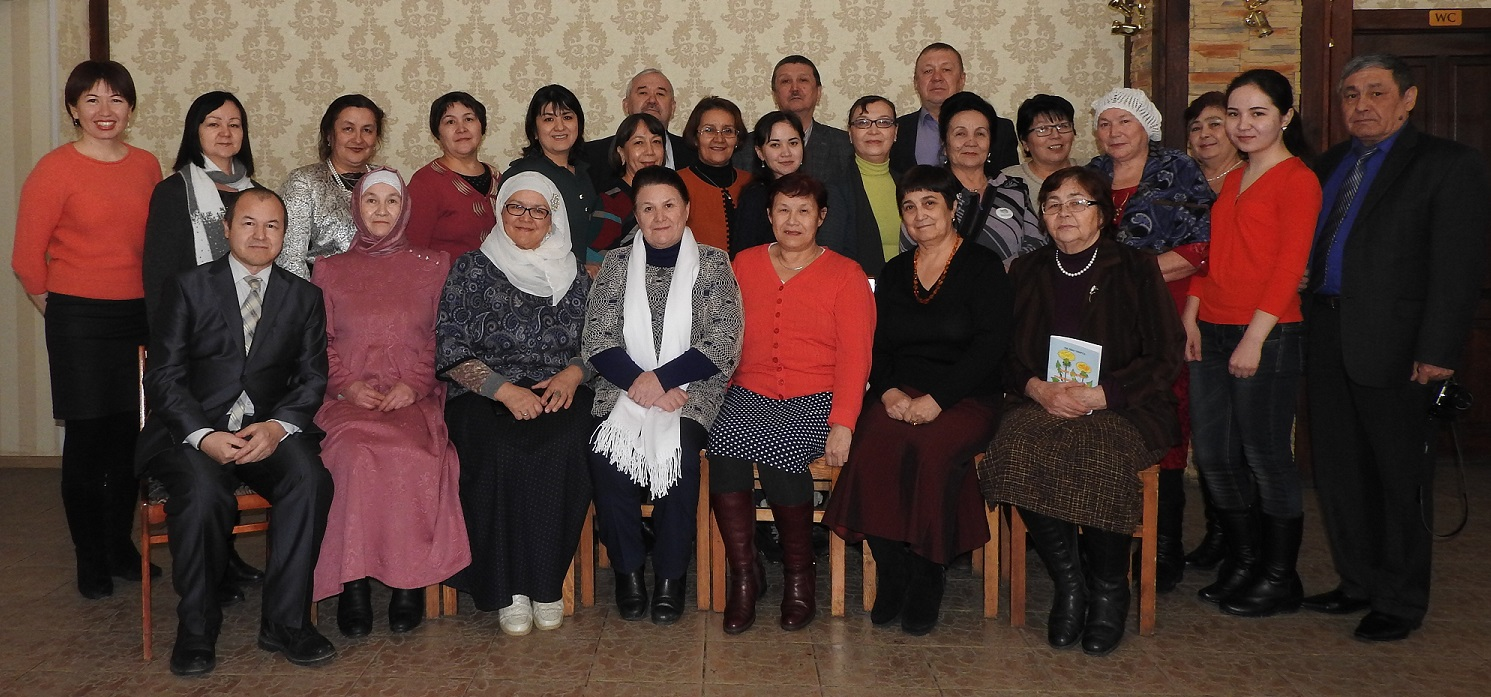
In 2016 in Ufa

In 2015, Bashkir public figure Guzal Sitdykowa, writer, poet and an active Wikipedian, called for development of the Bashkir Wikipedia through her locally popular page at the social network VKontakte. She asked her readers to join activists Rustam Nuryev and Zufar Salikhov, who were actively developing Wikipedia in their native Bashkir language. After that, people of retirement age who had free time joined the project. Later they began to be called Wikigrannies.

The idea came in 2016 in the course of preparations for the wiki-seminar "WikiUral" in Izhevsk, Udmurtia. The initiators were inspired by the experience of Buranovskiye Babushki (Buranovo Grannies), also from Udmurtia, that took 2nd place in Eurovision Song Contest 2012 and had international success.

The main reason for engaging elderly people in Wikipedia's language projects is that they are considered to be the strong holders of local culture such as Bashkir culture — while younger people of those cultures tend to operate in wider-scale cultures such as Russian and English. This produces fears of extinction of local cultures, so extra efforts are needed to preserve them, including maintenance of local Wikipedias.

Bashkir elderly Wikipedians became to participate as a group in numerous international Wikipedia events and cultural events in Bashkortostan, branding themselves as "Wiki-Grannies". Guzal Sitdykowa, Bashkir writer, poetess, publicist and translator, together with major Bashkir Wikipedia activist Zaytuna Nigamatyanova, played leading role in organizing them. Wikimedia Foundation's Wikigrannies User Group was registered by them on 26 October 2019. Also in 2019, the project was awarded by Federal Agency for Ethnic Affairs. Wikigrannies maintain collaboration with other Wikimedia groups such as WikiDonne dedicated to women in Wikipedia in general. They also received support from Farhad Fatkullin, 2018 Wikimedian of the Year from neighboring Tatarstan, who maintains wiki-supporting programs in different Russian regions. Wikimedia Russia also provides several types of collaboration to Wikigrannies.

Bashkir Wiki-Grannies displayed ability to produce large amount of Wiki work as many of them were previously school teachers, philologists, translators, etc., so they have enough qualification and experience for that type of work. As elderly people, they usually are retired and have a lot of spare time for this. Also, Wikigrannies sometimes actively participate in editing of neighboring Tatar Wikipedia as these languages are very close and often cross-used in native areas.

Bashkir Wiki-Grannies presented themselves and their work at a number of Wikimedia events in Moscow, Saint Petersburg, Ukraine, Berlin, Cape Town, Stockholm, Belgrade. In 2019 at the Wikimania conference in Stockholm, they were specially recognized by Wikimedia Foundation executive director Katherine Maher in her speech.

Since 2021, a small new group of "wiki-grannies" began to participate in the newly created wikipedia in the Altai language.
