= Farhad Fatkullin =

Russian social activist from Tatarstan (born 1979)

- Фаткуллин Фәрһад Наил улы (Tatar); Фархад Наилевич Фаткуллин (Russian)
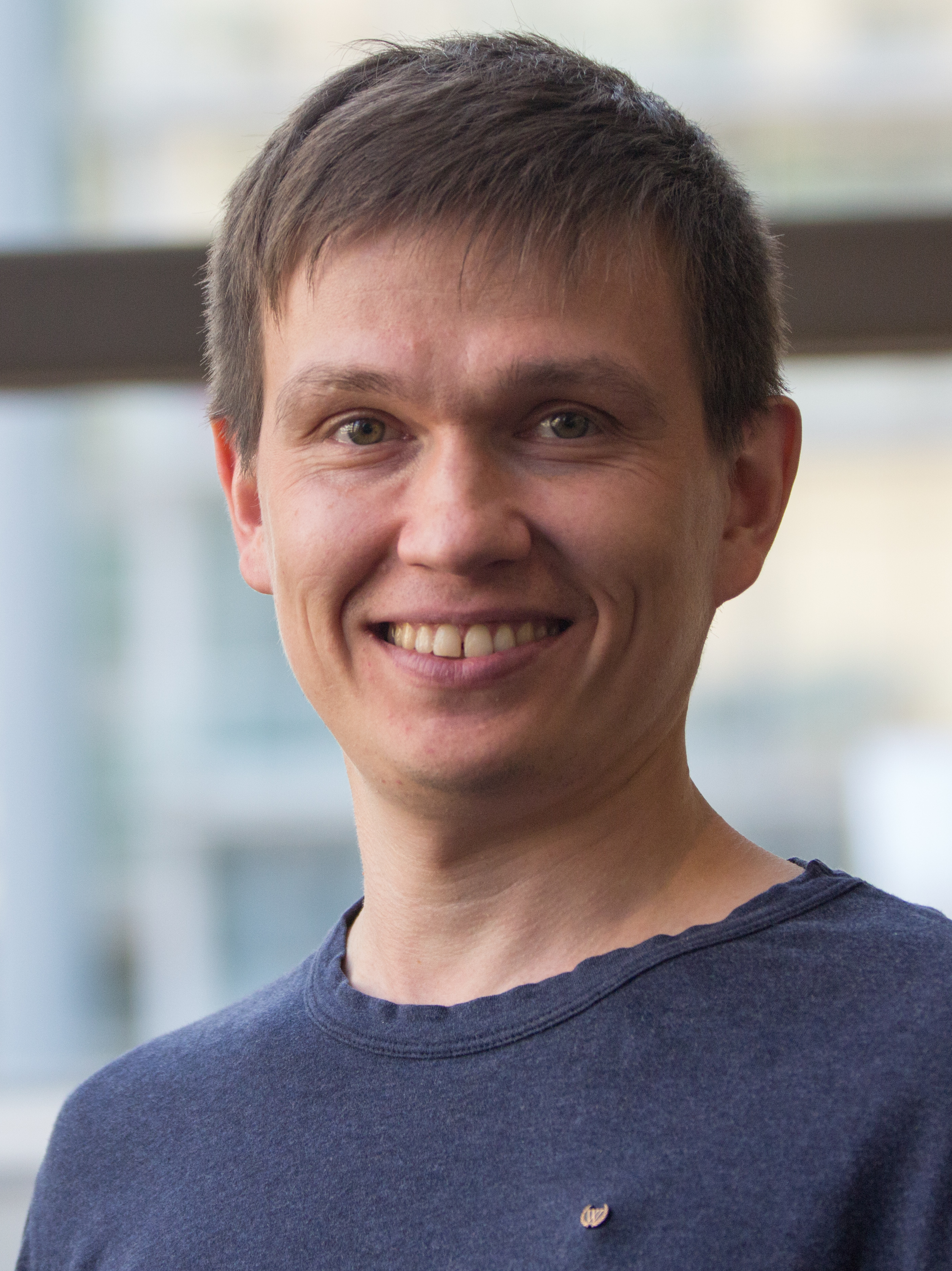
- Fatkullin in 2017
- Born: 2 November 1979 (age 46); Kazan, Tatar ASSR, Soviet Union
- Education: Kazan State Finance and Economics Institute, Moscow International School of Translation and Interpretation, Institute of Social and Humanities, Lyceum Boarding School No. 2, Clayton High School
- Occupations: Simultaneous interpreter; social activist
- Awards: Wikimedian of the Year (2018)
- Website: frhd.narod.ru

Farhad Nail Fatkullin (Note: Tatar: Фаткуллин Фәрһад Наил улы, romanized: Fatqullin Färhad Nail ulı, Tatar pronunciation: [fatqulːin fæhad nɑil ulɤ̞]; Russian: Фархад Наилевич Фаткуллин, romanized: Farhad Nailevich Fatkullin) (born 2 November 1979) is a Russian social activist from Tatarstan best known for his activities in promoting the Wikimedia movement among non-Russian speaking peoples of Russia. He was declared Wikimedian of the Year by Jimmy Wales during Wikimania 2018. He is a professional simultaneous interpreter previously serving for Mintimer Shaimiev, former President of Tatarstan.

== Biography ==
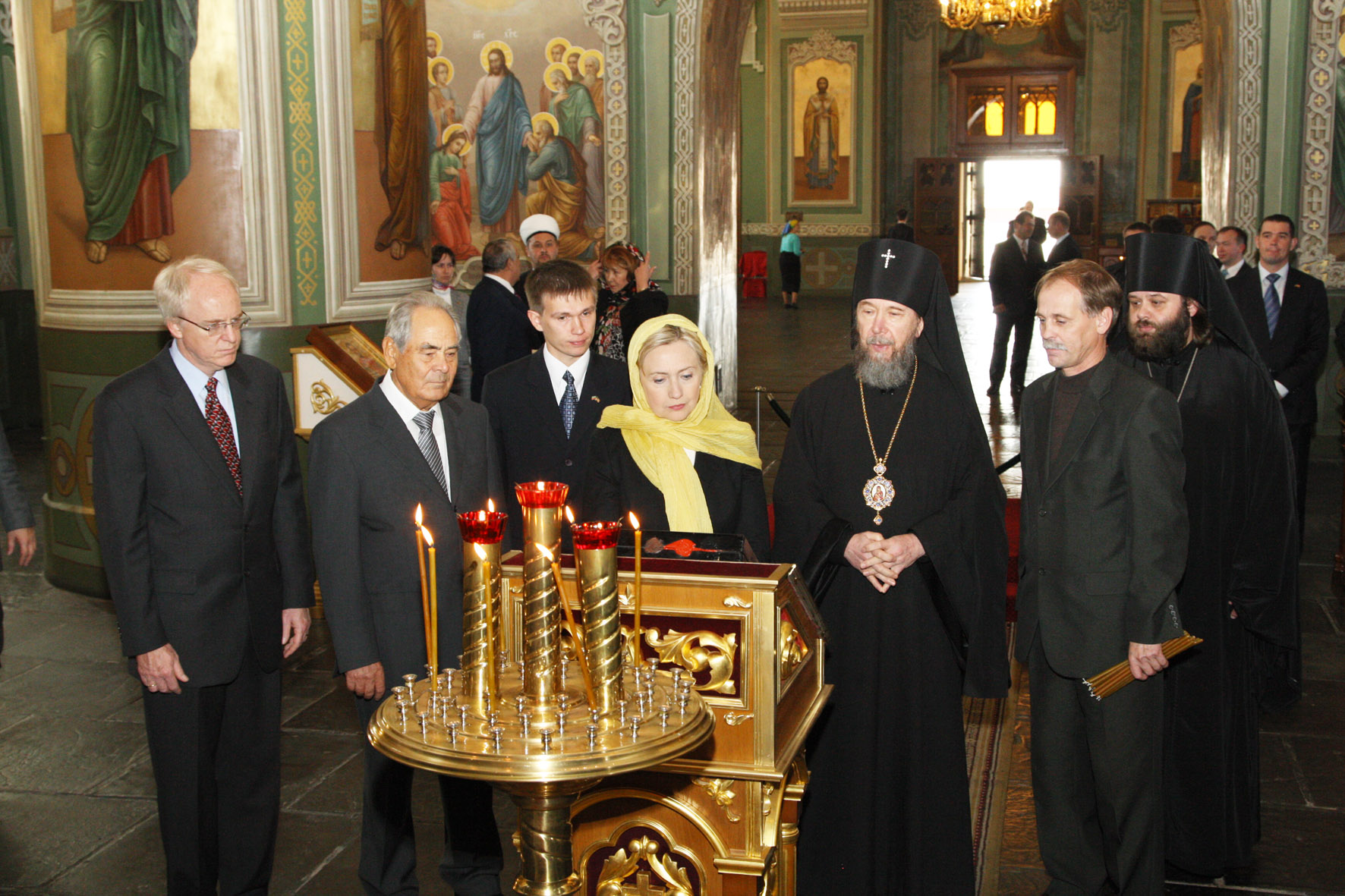
Farhad Fatkullin serving as English-Tatar simultaneous interpreter between Mintimer Shaimiev and Hillary Clinton in 2009

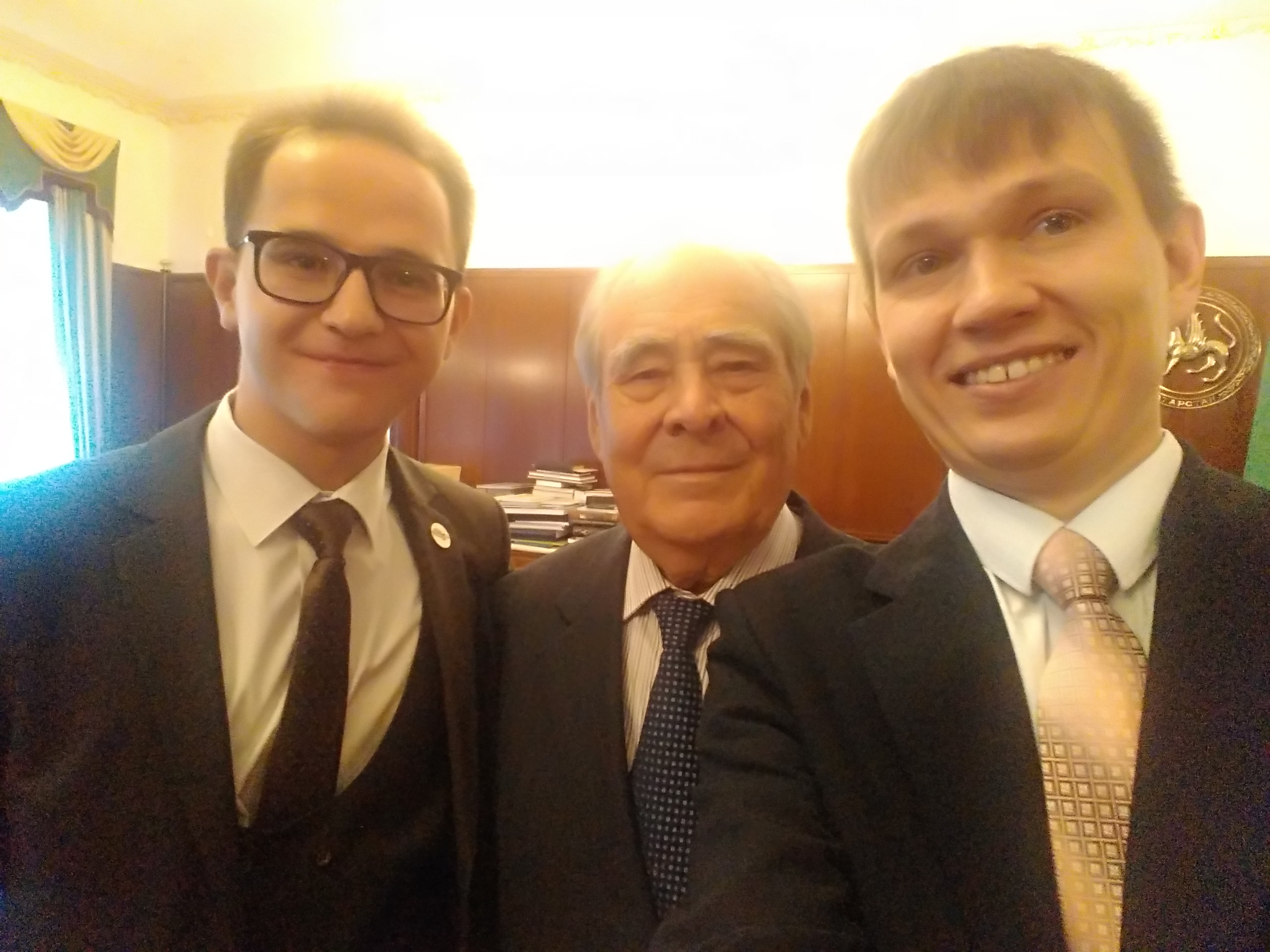
Fakullin in a meeting with Mintimer Shaimiev on Smart Region project

Fatkullin was born on 2 November 1979, in Kazan. He is married, with two children.

=== Education ===
- 1986–1993: Kazan High school No.123 with in-depth study of French language.
- 1993–1997: Ertugrul Gazi Tatar-Turkish high school, Kazan.
- 1995–1997: Clayton High School, Missouri, USA.
- 1997–2002: Kazan State Finance and Economics Institute, Economy of Enterprise—Finance management.
- 2004–2008: Institute of Social and Humanitarian Knowledge, Kazan, faculty of interpretation.

He speaks and is able to translate into Tatar, Russian, English, French, Turkish and Italian.

=== Professional activities ===
Teacher of "Risk Management" (in English) at Kazan State Finance and Economics Institute (Russia) and State University of New York at Canton (USA).

Interpreter of translation sector, State Protocol Department of the Republic of Tatarstan Presidential Administration. In particular, he was serving as English-Tatar simultaneous interpreter in the course of visit of Hillary Clinton to Tatarstan in 2009.

Has a lengthy record of many other translation activities at numerous political, educational, cultural and business events.

In 2020, he was included by the President of Tatarstan Rustam Minnikhanov into the Commission for Preservation and Development of the Tatar language consisting of 35 high-profile language and culture specialists.

== Wikimedia projects ==
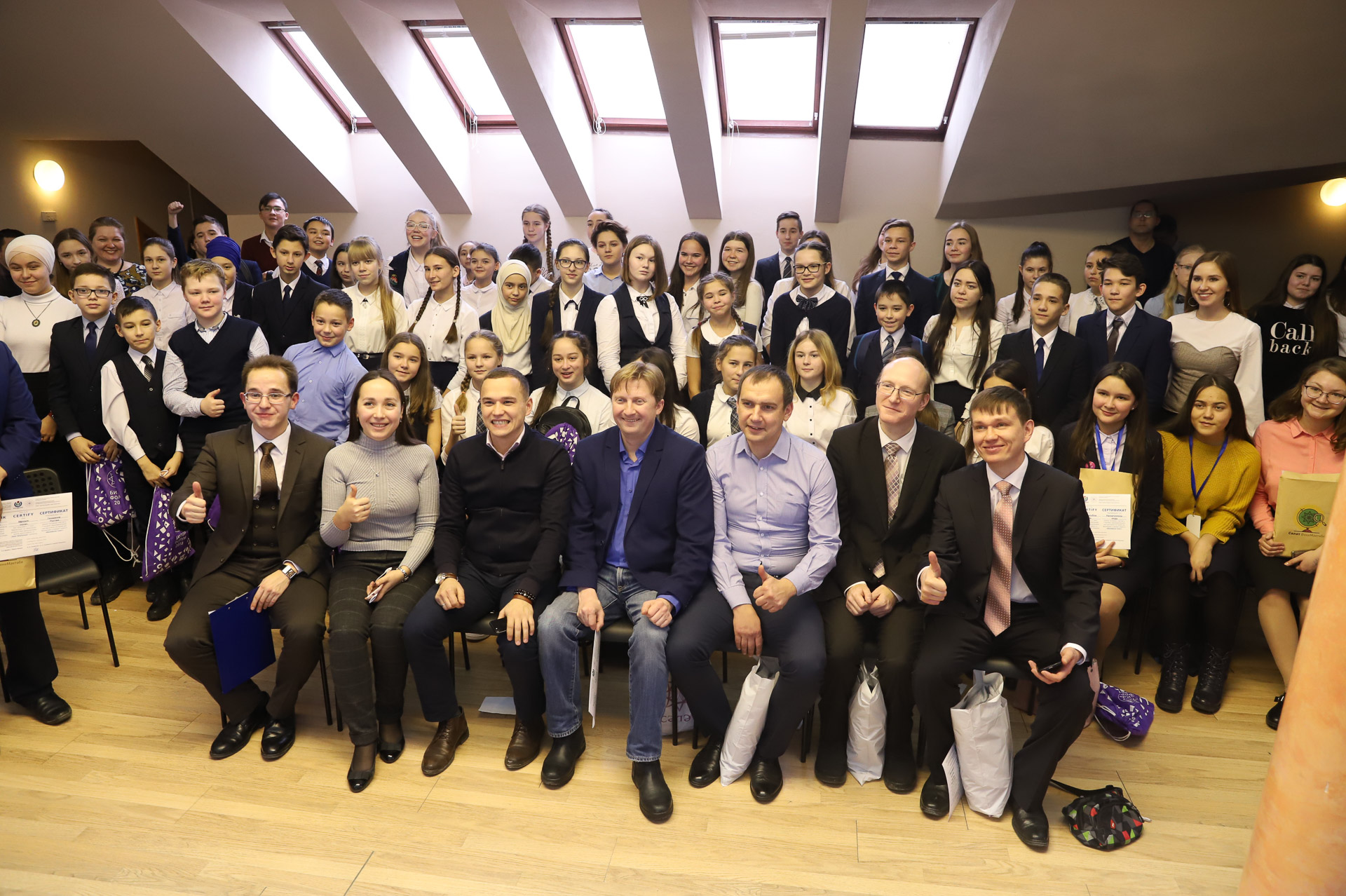
Year 2018 summarizing session at Selet WikiSchool

Farhad is involved in a large number of volunteering initiatives related to global Wikimedia movement and to development of Wikipedias in languages of Russia. These include:

- Selet WikiSchool (regional classes for learning wiki technologies);
- Smart region (project to use wiki technologies for governance);
- Wikimedia Community of Tatar language User Group (Wikimedia volunteers union);
- Wikimedia Russia (regional Wikimedia chapter);
- Tatar Wikipedia (development and promotion of a flagship Wikimedia project).

In 2018, at the moment his Wikimedian of the Year award was announced by Jimmy Wales at Wikimania in Cape Town, Farhad was busy at home simultaneously translating live broadcast from Wikimania for Russian Wikipedians as volunteer interpreter for community (without knowing he was going to be awarded).

Fatkullin is a member of Wikimedia Russia and maintains collaboration with Wikigrannies wiki-usergroup from neighboring Bashkortostan.
