= Marcell =

Marcell may refer to:

- Joseph Marcell, an actor from St. Lucia
- Marcell, Minnesota, an unincorporated town
- Marcell Township, Minnesota

== See also ==
- Marcel (disambiguation)
- Marcelle (disambiguation)
- Marcelling, a hair styling technique
