= Tatar Wikipedia =

Tatar-language edition of Wikipedia

- Screenshot
- Website type: Internet encyclopedia project
- Available in: Tatar language
- Headquarters: Miami, Florida
- Owner: Wikimedia Foundation
- Website: tt.wikipedia.org
- Commercial: Charitable
- Registration: Optional
- Launched: September 2003
- Content license: Creative Commons Attribution/Share-Alike 4.0 (most text also dual-licensed under GFDL); Media licensing varies

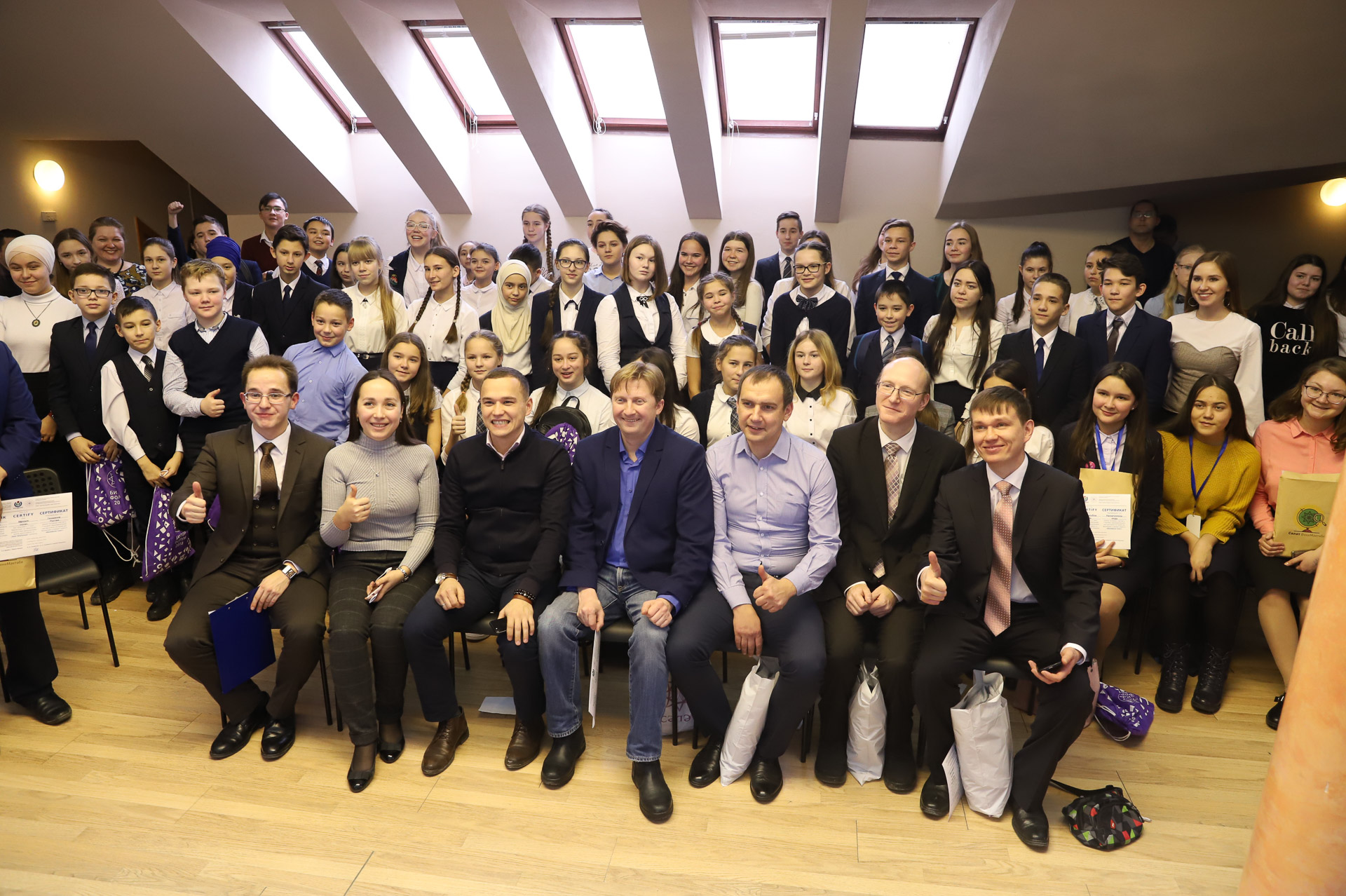
Selet WikiSchool — Tatarstan's official public initiative to develop and promote Tatar Wikipedia

The Tatar Wikipedia (Tatar: Татар Википедиясе, romanized: Tatar Vikipediyase) is the Tatar language edition of Wikipedia. Launched in September 2003, It currently has 709,216 articles, making it the 25th largest Wikipedia by article count. This Wikipedia has 7 administrators along with 62,549 registered users and 87 active users.

The Tatar Wikipedia mainly uses the Cyrillic script. However, unlike most other Cyrillic-based languages, some of the articles are in Latin script; accordingly, the language name appears in the language sidebar in both scripts.

One of the most active participators and promoters of Tatar Wikipedia is Farhad Fatkullin, Wikimedian of the Year 2018. An organized group of editors from Bashkir Wikipedia entitled Wikigrannies sometimes actively participate in editing of Tatar Wikipedia as these languages are very close and often cross-used in native areas.
