= Alsu Murtazina =

Russian triple jumper

Alsu Ilkhamovna Murtazina (Russian: Алсу Ильхамовна Муртазина; born 20 December 1987 in Kazan) is a Russian triple jumper. She has represented her country twice at the European Athletics Championships and won the Russian Athletics Championships in 2010.

== International competitions ==
Representing Russia
Year	Competition	Venue	Position	Event	Result	Notes
2009	European U23 Championships	Kaunas, Lithuania	6th	Triple jump	13.70 m	wind: 0.8 m/s
2010	European Championships	Barcelona, Spain	12th	Triple jump	13.65 m	
2013	Universiade	Kazan, Russia	5th	Triple jump	13.91 m	
2014	European Championships	Zürich, Switzerland	10th	Triple jump	13.76 m	

== See also ==
- List of people from Kazan
