= Marzel =

Marzel is a surname. Notable people with the surname include:

- Baruch Marzel (21st century), Israeli politician
- Itamar Marzel (born 1949), Israeli basketball player
- Ron Marzel (21st century), Canadian lawyer

== See also ==
- Jakob Marzel Sternberger (1750–1822), the first mayor of the town of Kadaň in the Czech Republic
- Marcel, given name and surname
- Marcil, a surname
