= Ayrat Kashaev =

Russian conductor (born 1984)

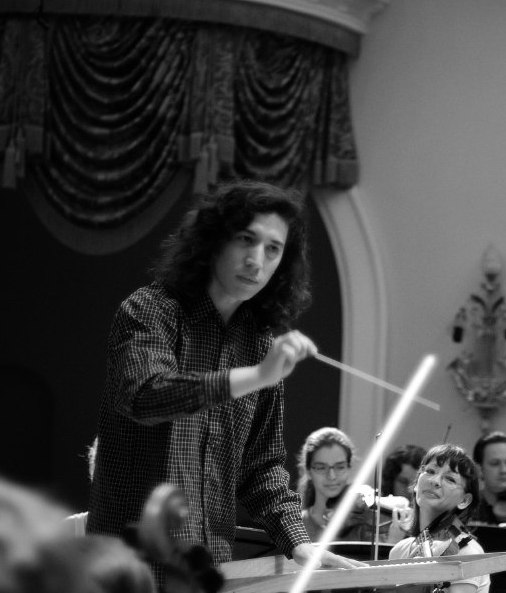
- Born: November 23, 1984 (age 40); Kazan, Russian Federation
- Occupation: Conductor

Ayrat Kashaev (Russian: Айрат Кашаев; born November 23, 1984) is a Russian conductor.

== Biography ==
Born in 1984 in Kazan, Russia, Ayrat Kashaev began his musical training at age four. In 2004 he graduated with honours in choral conducting from Kazan College of Music and entered the Kazan Conservatory.

In 2008 Kashaev was invited to continue his education in Moscow Tchaikovsky Conservatory, where he first studied choral conducting with Lev Kontorovitch (graduated in 2009, with honours) and then orchestra conducting with Gennady Rozhdestvensky (graduated in 2012 summa cum laude).

== Career ==
Since 2008 Kashaev has been the Principal Conductor of Galina Vishnevskaya College Theatre. In 2011-2013 Kashaev was the Artistic Director of Gnesin College of Music Choir. In April 2013 Kashaev was invited by Gennady Rozhdestvensky to become a conductor at Pokrovsky Chamber Opera. Since 2015 Kashaev has been the Director and Conductor of Taurida National Educational Forum's Symphony Orchestra.

=== Awards ===
In 2009 Kashaev won the Russian National Choral Conducting Competition.
