= Boris Obukhov =

Russian naval officer (1891–1937)

Boris Obukhov (born in 1891, Kazan, Russian Empire – died on 15 September 1937, Levashovo, Saint Petersburg, USSR) was a naval officer, a victim of Stalin's purges and a Catholic convert from Orthodoxy.

== Biography ==
Boris Obukhov was born in 1891 in Kazan, before the Russian Revolution served as a naval officer and had a university degree. After the Revolution he lived in Leningrad, where he joined to the Catholic Church from Russian Orthodoxy. In 1923 the group was involved for the cause of Russian Catholics, but escaped conviction. During a trip to Moscow, attended clandestine worship conducted in Father Sergei Solovyov (Catholic priest)'s apartment. On 16 August 1937 Obukhov was arrested in the case of Russian Catholics, and on August 31 of the same year was sentenced to death, executed on September 15 of that year near Leningrad.
