= Claude Marcel =

French diplomat, language teacher and applied linguist

Claude Victor André Marcel
- Born: 31 August 1793
- Died: 17 January 1876 (aged 82)
- Other name: C.V.A. Marcel
- Occupations: diplomat; language teacher; applied linguist
- Employer: Government of France
- Notable work: Practical Method of Teaching the Living Languages, Applied to the French; Language as a Means of Mental Culture and International Communication

Claude Victor André Marcel Knight, Leg Hon (31 August 1793 - 17 January 1876) was a French diplomat and language teacher who served in Cork as an official representative of the French government between 1816 and April 1863 and was additionally a teacher of French and the author of a two-volume study of language education published in London in 1853 under the title Language as a Means of Mental Culture and International Communication; or, Manual of the Teacher and the Learner of Languages. He has been seen as pioneer of applied linguistics.

== Biography ==
=== Early life and family ===
Claude Victor André Marcel was born on 31 August 1793 at rue Bertin Poirée 25, Section du Museum, Paris, to Claude Marcel (8 July 1767 - 13 November 1842) and Marie Catherine Geneviève Aubry (7 September 1764 - 10 April 1834). His father was an épicier and later an Hotelier. He was baptised in November 1793 at St. Germain-L'Auxerrois, Paris.

Claude was the second of 8 children, his siblings were:

- Marie Charlotte Marcel (17 August 1792 - 2 December 1872)
- Annibal Simon Marcel (23 November 1794 - 30 January 1875)
- Catherine Thaïse Marcel (24 July 1797 - 21 December 1878)
- Justine Louise Marcel (13 November 1798 - 28 January 1876)
- Virginie Julienne Marcel (16 May 1802 - 2 July 1879)
- Anne Marcel (1803 - 6 January 1866)
- Henriette Eloyse Marcel (b. 31 October 1807)

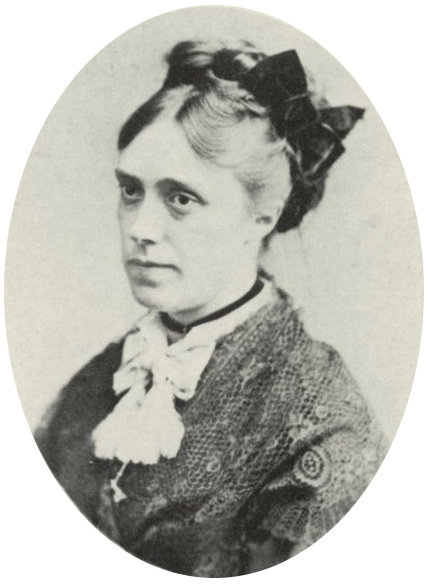
Camille Doncieux, first wife of Claude Monet.

Being born and living in Paris at the height of the French Revolution would have been a frightening experience. The Marcel family lived in the near vicinity of Palais des Tuilieries and Claude's parents would likely have been witness to the executions of notable figures.

His sister Catherine was the grandmother of Camille Léonie Doncieux, the first wife of Claude Monet.

13 years into his life in Cork, Claude married Anne Murray on 9 June 1829 at Ss. Peter and Paul's Roman Catholic Church, Cork. They lived at 48 Grande Parade, Cork, and had 9 children:

- Claude Joseph Marcel (1831 - After 1861)
- Justin James Marcel (29 December 1832 - 11 December 1920)
- Marie Henriette Marcel (May 1834 - 17 December 1923)
- Victor Joseph Marcel (26 August 1836 - 13 April 1885)
- Annie Josephine Marcel (August 1838 - 22 November 1902)
- Héloïse Virginie Marcel (4 March 1840 - 14 February 1908)
- James Augustin Marcel (29 August 1844 - 20 March 1888)
- Alfred Henri Marcel (May 1849 - 9 October 1883)
- Frédéric Charles Marcel (August 1852 - 19 April 1910)

=== Education and military career ===
Claude was educated at Lycée Napoléon, Paris, France, and later prepared l’École Polytechnique, a military college then located in Montagne Sainte Genevieve in the Quartier Latin in central Paris, but he never attended. In 1813 he enlisted in the Garde Impériale in the 13th Regiment of the Young Guard. He served in the Napoleonic Wars and received a shoulder injury at the Siege of Antwerp in January 1814.

=== Diplomatic career ===
In 1816, soon after the end of the war he took up an honorary post as Chancellor in the French Consulate in Cork, Ireland, then part of the United Kingdom. He was to remain there until he retired to Paris in April 1863, except for a short interruption caused by the French Revolution of 1830. Aside from his diplomatic duties he became a successful teacher of French, attracting local dignitaries including two bishops to his lessons.

In 1830, following the July Revolution which saw the overthrow of King Charles X, the consulate was closed and Claude became a consular agent. Patrice de MacMahon, later 1st Duc de Magenta, of Irish descent, gave a very good testimony “In impeccable conduct, he joins extensive knowledge; he is particularly devoted to the study of foreign languages and especially of English, which he speaks and writes extremely well; he even published in this language some pieces of literature, worthy of good English writers.” His liberal views earned him the same year, after the fall of Charles X and the arrival on the throne of Louis-Philippe, to be appointed by the city of Cork to invite Odilon Barrot, a French Politician and prefect of the Seine department, and General Lafayette who was a general in the American Revolutionary War and a leader of the Garde Nationale during the French Revolution, and address the people of Cork from the French people.

In 1835 he hosted in Cork François d'Orléans, prince de Joinville, son of King Louis-Philippe.

In 1839, his intervention in a maritime incident earned him recognition and the friendship of Admiral Baron Ange de Mackau, who was to intervene on several occasions in his favor afterwards. On his way back from Martinique, an island in the Caribbean Sea, the frigate Tepsichore commanded by Baron de Mackau, on which was all its family, was attacked by a terrible storm, and remained several days in perdition on the coasts of Ireland. To have it towed, they called in a boat belonging to a company of merchants and shipowners. They asked 500 guineas to save the ship but Claude reduced the amount to 50 guineas.

This action, however, gave him some strong enmities on the part of certain traders, at least this is what he affirmed a few years later by adding that to harm him, his enemies had appealed to teachers of foreign languages by means of small advertisements published in the English newspapers in order to make him lose his clientele.

A few years later, Marcel had to intervene successfully in favour of the crew of the Aurore, sentenced to a long detention for breach of customs regulations. He obtained their quick release while the consul of France to Dublin had not been able to obtain it from the Viceroy of Ireland.

From 1840, Claude had applied for the title of honorary consul in Cork. Baron de Mackau who intervened on his behalf then wrote “he is a talented man who enjoys Cork where I saw him with very special consideration”. This request was approved and an ordinance of 29 February 1840 granted him the title of honorary consul with an annual allowance of 1000 francs.

The government of Napoleon III made Marcel a knight of the Légion d'honneur as well as elevating his mission in Cork to a full consulate and rewarding him with an increased salary and a bonus.

=== Work ===
Early on, probably to help make ends meet, he began to engage in French language teaching, and the Southern Reporter of 19 October 1819 carried an advertisement stating that he had "opened a French Practical School" in South Mall in the city. Little more is known about his teaching or business activities at this time, except what can be inferred from newspaper adverts, and his books, the first of which, Practical Method of Teaching the Living Languages, Applied to the French, in which Several Defects of the Old Method are Pointed Out and Remedied, 1820, was published in London in the year following the opening of his school, under the name C. V. A. Marcel.

While he continued to work as Chancellor in the French Consulate in Patrick Street as stated in Pigot and Co.’s City of Dublin and Hibernian Provincial Directory Containing a Classification of the Nobility, Gentry, Clergy, professional Gentlemen, Merchants, and Manufacturers of Dublin and upwards of Two Hundred & Twenty of the Principal Cities, Seaports and Towns of Ireland, Alphabetically Arranged in Provinces, 1824:264, Claude’s own French classes were gaining increasing favour in the local Cork community.

On 13 August 1825, an announcement ran in the Southern Reporter that a “Seminary for the General Education of Young Gentlemen” was open at 9 Grand Parade, under the Principals Claude Marcel and James Ward. Claude is described as being a member of the Grammatical Society, and the Royal Society [Academy] of Sciences, Paris. However, he does not appear under the members lists for the latter.

One of his pupils was the young painter, Daniel Maclise (1806-1870), a Cork native who painted a portrait of Claude in June 1827, and was exhibited locally in 1828 (according to the Constitution of 27th May 1828) and who subsequently went on to become well-known in England as a portraitist, caricaturist and historical painter. Numerous members of the local establishment also learned French with Claude, including the Catholic and Protestant Bishops of Cork, the Governor-General of the province, and members of the clergy, the judiciary and the medical profession.

In 1853 his major work, the Language as a Means of Mental Culture and International Communication was also published in London, privately and for limited distribution.

Contrary to earlier scholars believing that Claude Marcel published Méthode Marcellienne, ou methode naturelle théorisée in 1833 under a pseudonym "Annibal Marcel", records show that this was in fact written by his brother Annibal Simon Marcel, himself a professor of languages at École Royale des Mines. His death certificate confirms him to have been a "Professeur de langues". L'Ouest Parisien (5 November 1864) confirms Annibal to be the "inventeur d’une nouvelle méthode, dite méthode Marcel" and Le Corsaire (21 October 1827) reaffirms this.

After his retirement in the late 1850s Marcel issued a number of publications, often re-presenting the ideas of Language as a Means of Mental Culture and International Communication. In the 1870s he published learning materials including English grammar tables and various readers. At the time of his death he appears to have been working on a comparative grammar of French and English.

=== Death ===
Claude Marcel died on 17 January 1876 at rue Notre-Dame de Lorette 52, Paris and was buried at Père Lachaise Cemetery on 20 January in section D92 grave no. 240cc. His wife, Anne, died 27 July 1890 and was interred with Claude. Their sons Alfred and Frédéric were also interred in the same grave. Their remains have since been exhumed and placed in the Ossuary within the cemetery.
