= Yekaterina Ektova =

Kazakhstani triple jumper

Personal information
- Born: 30 August 1992 (age 33)
- Education: North Kazakhstan State University
- Height: 1.70 m (5 ft 7 in)
- Weight: 59 kg (130 lb)

Sport
- Sport: Athletics
- Event: Triple jump

Yekaterina Ektova (Kazakh: Екатерина Эктова; born 30 August 1992) is a Kazakhstani athlete specialising in the triple jump. She represented her country at the 2016 Summer Olympics without qualifying for the final.

Her personal bests in the event are 14.16 metres outdoors (+1.0 m/s, Almaty 2016) and 13.19 metres indoors (Karaganda 2012).

== International competitions ==
Year	Competition	Venue	Position	Event	Notes
Representing Kazakhstan
2007	World Youth Championships	Ostrava, Czech Republic	20th (q)	Triple jump	11.88 m
2009	World Youth Championships	Brixen, Italy	17th (q)	Long jump	5.75 m
2009	World Youth Championships	Brixen, Italy	4th	Triple jump	13.36 m
2010	Asian Junior Championships	Hanoi, Vietnam	4th	Long jump	5.97 m (w)
2010	Asian Junior Championships	Hanoi, Vietnam	4th	Triple jump	12.88 m
2010	World Junior Championships	Moncton, Canada	18th (q)	Long jump	5.49 m
2010	World Junior Championships	Moncton, Canada	17th (q)	Triple jump	12.74 m
2012	Asian Indoor Championships	Hangzhou, China	4th	Triple jump	13.05 m
2013	Universiade	Kazan, Russia	10th	Triple jump	13.05 m
2014	Asian Indoor Championships	Hangzhou, China	8th	Triple jump	12.38 m
2016	Asian Indoor Championships	Doha, Qatar	10th	Long jump	5.57 m
2016	Olympic Games	Rio de Janeiro, Brazil	29th (q)	Triple jump	13.51 m
