= Marcel Scharrelmann =

German politician (born 1982)

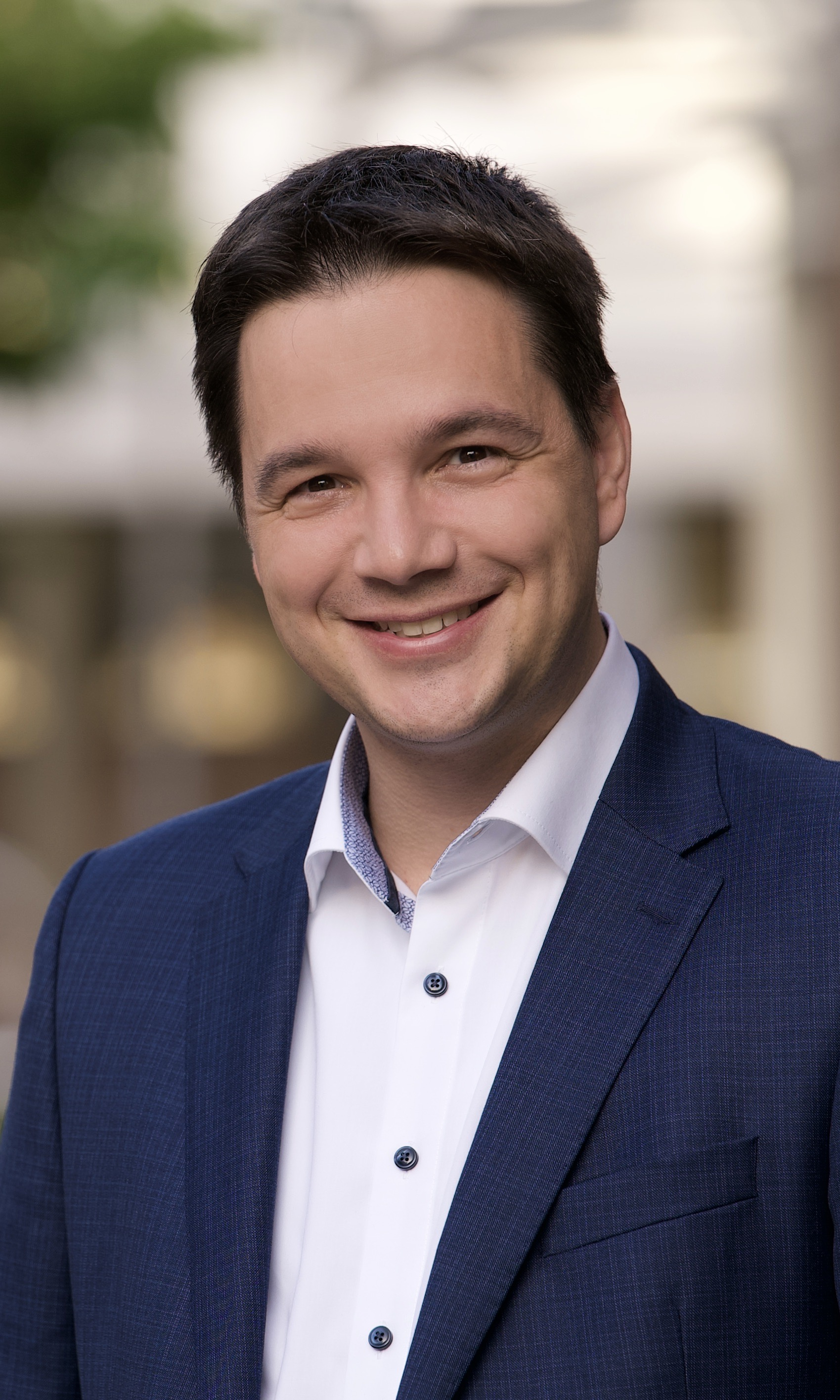
- Scharrelmann in 2022

Member of the Landtag of Lower Saxony
- Incumbent
- Assumed office 14 November 2017
- Preceded by: Karl-Heinz Klare
- Constituency: Diepholz

Personal details
- Born: 21 November 1982 (age 43) Vechta
- Party: Christian Democratic Union (since 2002)

Marcel Scharrelmann (born 21 November 1982 in Vechta) is a German politician serving as a member of the Landtag of Lower Saxony since 2017. He has served as chairman of the Christian Democratic Union in Diepholz since 2025.
