= Kazan State Finance and Economics Institute =

Coordinates: 55°47′12″N 49°07′35″E

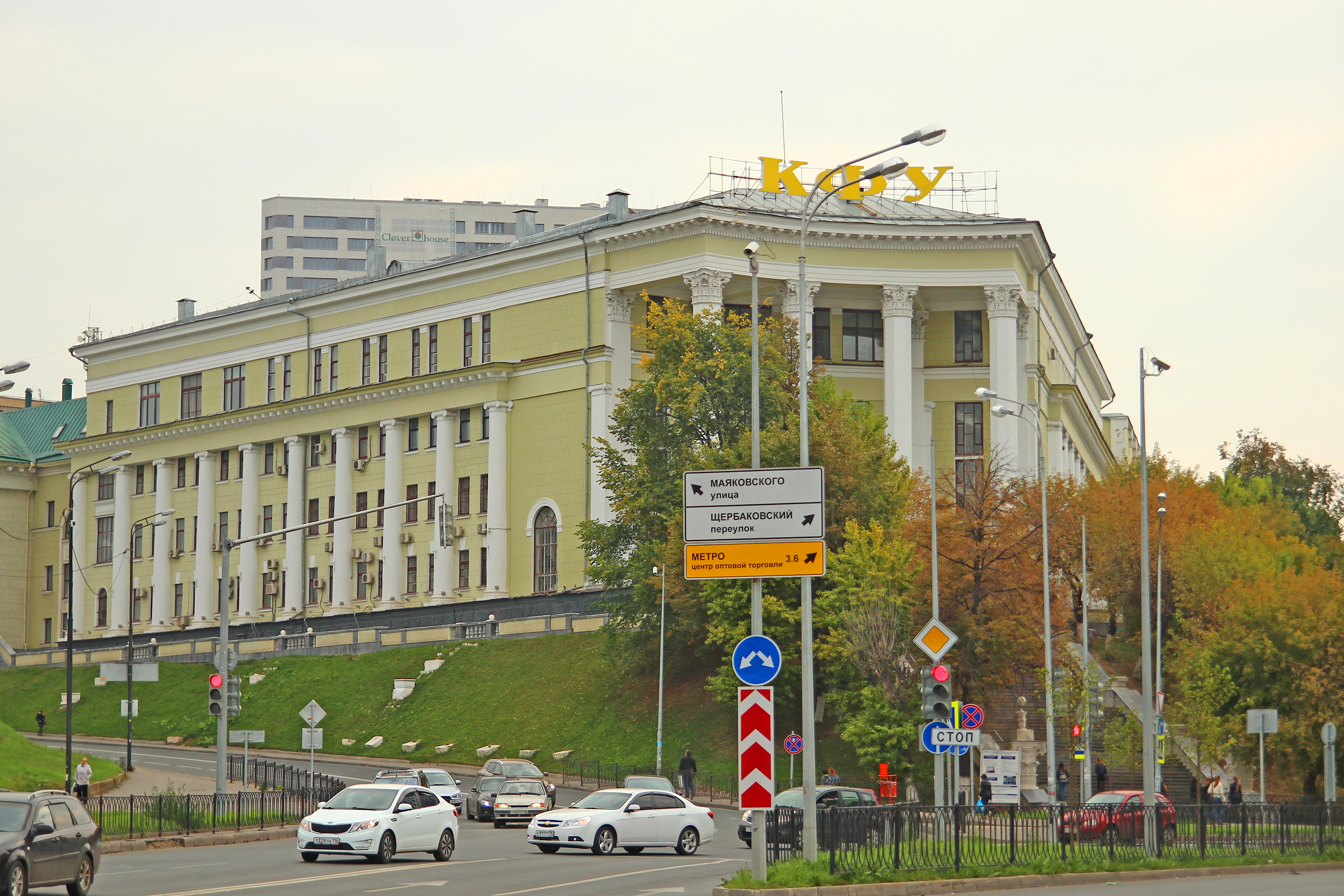
Kazan State Finance and Economics Institute Main building

The Kazan State Finance and Economics Institute (Russian: Казанский государственный финансово-экономический институт; Tatar: Казань дәүләт финанс-икътисад институты, romanized: Qazan däwlät finans-iqtisad institutı, KSFEI) is an Institute in the city of Kazan of the Republic of Tatarstan, Russia.

== Overview ==
The institution was founded in 1931. It evolved from the Faculty of Economics of the Kazan State University named after Vladimir Lenin.

The institute offers undergraduate (bachelor's), postgraduate (master's), and research (doctoral) degrees. It also offers higher education degrees for people already holding university degrees. These are offered in management of enterprise, finance and credits, and accounting and audit.

There are six faculties in the institute:

- Faculty of General Economics
- Faculty of Management
- Faculty of Finance and Credits
- Faculty of the Economy of Enterprise
- Faculty of Part-time Education
- Faculty of Re-training Graduates

In 2002 the institute started to offer the MBA program.

At the moment there are 3,500 full-time students and 279 academic members of staff.
