= Marsel Kararbo =

Indonesian association footballer

Personal information
- Full name: Marsel Alexander Kararbo
- Date of birth: 1 October 1994 (age 32)
- Place of birth: Jayapura, Indonesia
- Height: 1.64 m (5 ft 5 in)
- Position: Winger

Youth career
- Persipura Jayapura

Senior career*
Years	Team	Apps	(Gls)
2017	Persewangi Banyuwangi	2	(0)
2018	Persipura Jayapura	2	(0)
2019	Persela Lamongan	5	(0)
2020–2021	Persewar Waropen	6	(2)
2022	Kalteng Putra	2	(0)
- * Club domestic league appearances and goals as of 30 September 2022

Marsel Alexander Kararbo (born 1 October 1994) is an Indonesian professional footballer who plays as a left winger.

== Club career ==
=== Persipura Jayapura ===
In 2018, Kararbo signed a contract with Indonesian Liga 1 club Persipura Jayapura. He made his league debut on 7 April 2018 in a match against PS TIRA at the Mandala Stadium, Jayapura.

=== Persela Lamongan ===
He was signed for Persela Lamongan to play in Liga 1 in the 2019 season. Kararbo made his league debut on 17 May 2019 in a match against Madura United at the Surajaya Stadium, Lamongan.

=== Persewar Waropen ===
Kararbo joined the Persewar Waropen club in the 2020 Liga 2. This season was suspended on 27 March 2020 due to the COVID-19 pandemic. The season was abandoned and was declared void on 20 January 2021.
