= Marsel Tukhvatullin =

Russian footballer

Personal information
- Full name: Marsel Nakipovich Tukhvatullin
- Date of birth: 22 November 1974 (age 51)
- Place of birth: Kazan, Russian SFSR
- Height: 1.68 m (5 ft 6 in)
- Position: Forward

Youth career
- Volna Kazan

Senior career*
| Years | Team | Apps | (Gls) |
| 1992 | FC Idel Kazan | 13 | (0) |
| 1992–1993 | FC KAMAZ Naberezhnye Chelny | 13 | (0) |
| 1993 | → FC KAMAZ-d Naberezhnye Chelny (loan) | 9 | (1) |
| 1993–1995 | FC Progress Zelenodolsk | 68 | (8) |
| 1996 | FC Rubin Kazan | 26 | (1) |
| 1997 | FC Diana Volzhsk (amateur) | | |
| 1998 | FC Diana Volzhsk | 21 | (1) |
| 2009 | FC Taro Layt Kazan | | |
- * Club domestic league appearances and goals

Marsel Nakipovich Tukhvatullin (Tatar: Марсил Нәкыйп улы Төхфәтуллин, Russian: Марсель Накипович Тухватуллин; born 22 November 1974 in Kazan) is a former Russian football player.
