= Marcel (footballer, born 1992) =

Brazilian footballer

Personal information
- Full name: Marcel Henrique Garcia Alves Pereira
- Date of birth: 16 October 1992 (age 34)
- Place of birth: São José do Rio Preto, Brazil
- Height: 1.87 m (6 ft 2 in)
- Position: Midfielder

Youth career
- 2008–2011: São Paulo

Senior career*
Years	Team	Apps	(Gls)
2012–2013	São Paulo	0	(0)
2012	→ Mirassol (loan)	2	(0)
2013	→ Noroeste (loan)	2	(0)
2013	→ Mirassol (loan)	0	(0)
2014–2015	Boa Esporte	8	(0)
2015–2021	Portimonense	81	(3)
2020	→ Penafiel (loan)	4	(1)
2020–2021	→ Londrina (loan)	15	(0)
- * Club domestic league appearances and goals as of 21 April 2021

Marcel Henrique Garcia Alves Pereira (born 16 October 1992), known as Marcel, is a Brazilian football player.

== Club career ==
He made his professional debut in the Campeonato Brasileiro Série B for Boa Esporte on 19 April 2014 in a game against Atlético Goianiense.
