= Alexander Rybakov (ice hockey) =

Russian ice hockey player

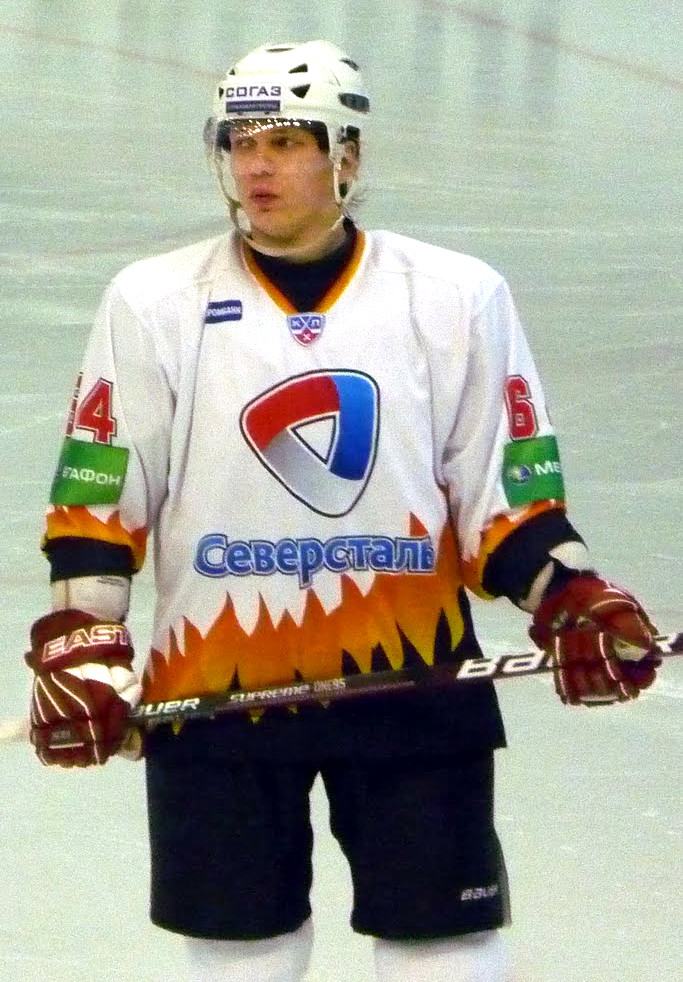
- Born: August 11, 1985 (age 41) Kazan, Russian SFSR
- Height: 6 ft 0 in (183 cm)
- Weight: 207 lb (94 kg; 14 st 11 lb)
- Position: Forward
- Shoots: Left
- KHL team Former teams: Free Agent; Ak Bars Kazan; Neftekhimik Nizhnekamsk; Spartak Moscow; Severstal Cherepovets; Atlant Moscow Oblast; HC Ugra; Vityaz Podolsk; Avtomobilist Yekaterinburg; Traktor Chelyabinsk; Dynamo Moscow; HC Sochi
- Playing career: 2003–present

Alexander V. Rybakov (Russian: Александр Рыбаков, born August 11, 1985) is a Russian professional ice hockey forward who is currently an unrestricted free agent. He most recently played for HC Sochi of the Kontinental Hockey League (KHL). He has previously played with HC Spartak Moscow in the KHL.
