= The World Qoroltai of the Bashkirs =

The World Qoroltai of the Bashkirs (The World Kurultai of the Bashkirs) (Bashkir: Бөтә донъя башҡорттары ҡоролтайы (конгресы)) — international Union of Public Organizations, designed to meet the challenges of unification, ethnic and cultural development and renewal Bashkirs. Headquartered in Bashkortostan in Ufa.

== Goals ==
1. Upholding the cultural identity of the Bashkirs in conditions of increasing globalization
2. Maintaining and enhancing the quality of teaching of the Bashkir language
3. Countering attempts to distort the history of the Bashkir people and the role of prominent figures
4. Spiritual and moral and patriotic education of youth
5. Adapting to the established multi-ethnic society representatives of the people, who had not previously inhabited Bashkortostan
6. Development of international cooperation in the sphere of national policy

== History ==
The tradition of Bashkirs to gather for kurultay or iyiyn to discuss the most important issues and solutions to pressing problems is rooted in the deep past. It is documented that Kurultai were still in place in the years 1556-1557, when they deliberated the question of voluntary inclusion of Bashkortostan into Russia. After the agreement on the conditions of entry into Russia, its results have been approved by iyiyn birth.

After a series of Bashkir rebellions, which were mostly decided in Kurultai, the tsarist government in order to end the unrest in Bashkortostan banned the gathering of iyiyny.

== III The World Qoroltai of the Bashkirs ==
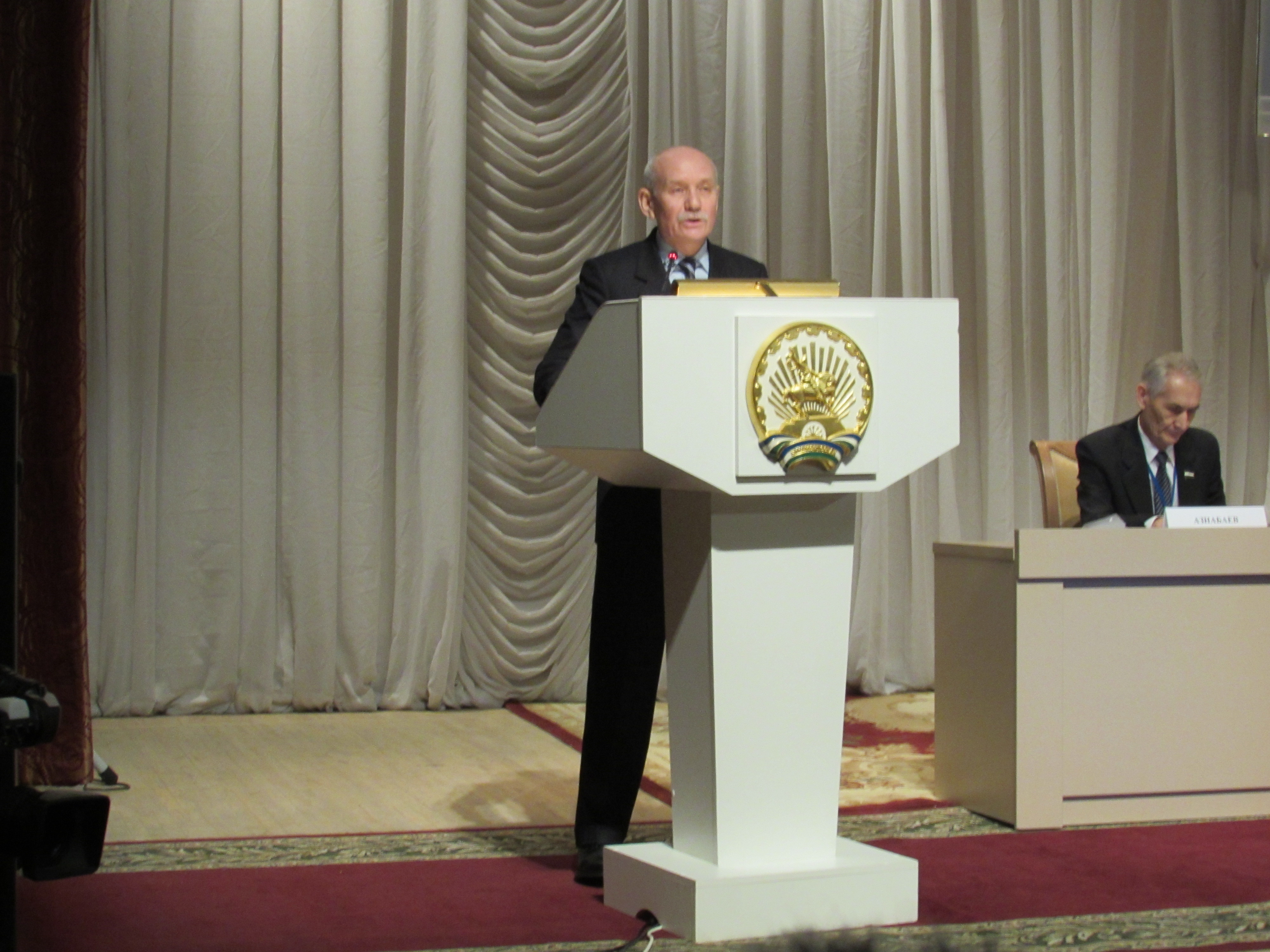
Bashkortostan President Rustem Khamitov addresses the IV The World Qoroltai

== IV The World Qoroltai of the Bashkirs ==
IV The World Qoroltai of the Bashkirs was held on 19–21 November 2015 in Ufa. Bashkir Wikipedia significance was particularly emphasized at the event.

== The measures undertaken ==
1. Days Bashkir kutsltury in cities and regions of Russia and the world.
2. Konkurss "A sober Village"

== Links ==
- official website MSOO "World kurultay Bashkir"
- Kurultaj Bashkirs
- Kurultaj in Bashkortostan: a brief encyclopedia
- II World kurultay Bashkirs
- History vsebashkirskih kurultays
