= Romania at the 2017 World Championships in Athletics =

- WA code: ROU
- National federation: Federatia Romana de Atletism
- Website: www.fra.ro

in London
- Competitors: 15
- Medals: Gold 0 Silver 0 Bronze 0 Total 0

World Championships in Athletics appearances
- 1983; 1987; 1991; 1993; 1995; 1997; 1999; 2001; 2003; 2005; 2007; 2009; 2011; 2013; 2015; 2017; 2019; 2022; 2023; 2025

Romania competed at the 2017 World Championships in Athletics in London, Great Britain, from 4–13 August 2017.

== Results ==
(q – qualified, NM – no mark, SB – season best)

=== Men ===
Track and road events

| Athlete | Event | Final | |
| Athlete | Event | Result | Rank |
|---|---|---|---|
| Marius Ionescu | Marathon | DNF | – |
| Narcis Ștefan Mihăilă | 50 kilometres walk | 4:02:27 SB | 31 |
| Florin Alin Stirbu | 50 kilometres walk | DQ | – |

Field events

| Athlete | Event | Qualification | | Final | |
| Athlete | Event | Distance | Position | Distance | Position |
|---|---|---|---|---|---|
| Andrei Gag | Shot put | 21.61 SB | 11 q | 19.96 | 12 |
| Alexandru Novac | Javelin throw | 74.67 | 29 | Did not advance | |

=== Women ===
Track and road events

| Athlete | Event | Heat | | Semifinal | | Final | |
| Athlete | Event | Result | Rank | Result | Rank | Result | Rank |
|---|---|---|---|---|---|---|---|
| Bianca Răzor | 400 metres | 51.64 | 15 q | 52.09 | 18 | Did not advance | |
| Claudia Bobocea | 1500 metres | 4:11.20 | 35 | Did not advance | | | |
| Liliana Maria Dragomir | Marathon | —N/a | | | | 2:53:30 | 67 |
| Paula-Claudia Todoran | Marathon | —N/a | | | | DNF | – |
| Andreea Arsine | 20 kilometres walk | —N/a | | | | 1:33:46 PB | 31 |
| Ana Veronica Rodean | 20 kilometres walk | —N/a | | | | 1:34:50 SB | 34 |

Field events

| Athlete | Event | Qualification | | Final | |
| Athlete | Event | Distance | Position | Distance | Position |
|---|---|---|---|---|---|
| Angela Moroșanu | Long jump | 5.92 | 27 | Did not advance | |
| Alina Rotaru | Long jump | 6.50 | 10 q | 6.46 | 12 |
| Elena Panțuroiu | Triple jump | 14.02 | 14 | Did not advance | |
| Bianca Perie-Ghelber | Hammer throw | 65.07 | 24 | Did not advance | |
