= Romania at the 2023 World Athletics Championships =

- Flag of Romania
- WA code: ROU

in Budapest, Hungary 19 August 2023 – 27 August 2023
- Competitors: 16 (7 men and 9 women)
- Medals Ranked 39th: Gold 0 Silver 0 Bronze 1 Total 1

World Athletics Championships appearances
- 1983; 1987; 1991; 1993; 1995; 1997; 1999; 2001; 2003; 2005; 2007; 2009; 2011; 2013; 2015; 2017; 2019; 2022; 2023; 2025

Romania competed at the 2023 World Athletics Championships in Budapest, Hungary, from 19 to 27 August 2023.

== Medalists ==
Medal	Athlete	Event	Date
Bronze	Alina Rotaru-Kottmann	Women's long jump	August 20

== Results ==
Romania entered 16 athletes.

Key

- Q = Qualified for the next round
- q = Qualified for the next round as a fastest loser or, in field events, by position without achieving the qualifying target
- NR = National record
- PB = Personal best
- SB = Season best
- N/A = Round not applicable for the event

=== Men ===
Track and road events

Athlete	Event	Final	
Athlete	Event	Result	Rank
Ilie Alexandru Corneschi	Marathon	DNF	
Nicolae Soare	Marathon	2:25:14	56
Narcis Mihăilă	35 kilometres walk	DNF	

Field events

Athlete	Event	Qualification		Final	
Athlete	Event	Distance	Position	Distance	Position
Gabriel Bitan	Long jump	7.32	36	Did not advance	
Andrei Toader	Shot put	NM		Did not advance	
Alin Firfirică	Discus throw	61.03	29	Did not advance	
Alexandru Novac	Javelin throw	75.75	25	Did not advance	

=== Women ===
Track and road events

Athlete	Event	Heat		Semifinal		Final	
Athlete	Event	Result	Rank	Result	Rank	Result	Rank
Andrea Miklós	400 metres	51.24	2 Q	50.77	5	Did not advance	
Claudia Bobocea	800 metres	2:00.54 PB	4	Did not advance			
Claudia Bobocea	1500 metres	4:06.07	9	Did not advance			
Mihaela Acatrinei	35 kilometres walk	—				DNF	
Ana Rodean	35 kilometres walk	—				DNF	

Field events

Athlete	Event	Qualification		Final	
Athlete	Event	Distance	Position	Distance	Position
Daniela Stanciu	High jump	1.85	=20	Did not advance	
Alina Rotaru-Kottmann	Long jump	6.69	9 q	6.88	3rd place, bronze medalist(s)
Diana Ana Maria Ion	Triple jump	13.66	22	Did not advance	
Elena Panțuroiu	Triple jump	14.06 =SB	15	Did not advance	
Bianca Ghelber	Hammer throw	73.67	5 Q	73.70	7
