= Romania at the 2025 World Athletics Championships =

- Flag of Romania
- WA code: ROM

in Tokyo, Japan 13 September 2025 – 21 September 2025
- Competitors: 9 (3 men and 6 women)
- Medals: Gold 0 Silver 0 Bronze 0 Total 0

World Athletics Championships appearances
- 1983; 1987; 1991; 1993; 1995; 1997; 1999; 2001; 2003; 2005; 2007; 2009; 2011; 2013; 2015; 2017; 2019; 2022; 2023; 2025

Romania competed at the 2025 World Athletics Championships in Tokyo, Japan, from 13 to 21 September 2025.

== Results ==
Romania entered 9 athletes to the championships: 6 women and 3 men.

Key

- Q = Qualified for the next round
- q = Qualified for the next round as a fastest loser or, in field events, by position without achieving the qualifying target
- NR = National record
- PB = Personal best
- SB = Season best
- N/A = Round not applicable for the event

=== Men ===
==== Track and road events ====
Athlete	Event	Heat		Semifinal		Final	
Athlete	Event	Result	Rank	Result	Rank	Result	Rank
Mihai Sorin Dringo	400 metres	45.21	6	Did not advance			

==== Field events ====
Athlete	Event	Qualification		Final	
Athlete	Event	Distance	Position	Distance	Position
Andrei Rares Toader	Shot put	20.38	13	Did not advance	
Alin Alexandru Firfirică	Discus throw	60.78	24	Did not advance	

=== Women ===
==== Track and road events ====
Athlete	Event	Heat		Semifinal		Final	
Athlete	Event	Result	Rank	Result	Rank	Result	Rank
Andrea Miklós	400 metres	50.96 SB	3 Q	50.90 SB	6	Did not advance	
Stella Rutto	3000 metres steeplechase	9:55.76	12	—N/a		Did not advance	

==== Field events ====
Athlete	Event	Qualification		Final	
Athlete	Event	Distance	Position	Distance	Position
Alina Rotaru-Kottmann	Long jump	6.37	24	Did not advance	
Diana Ana Maria Ion	Triple jump	13.64	26	Did not advance	
Elena Andreea Taloș	Triple jump	13.85	15	Did not advance	
Bianca Florentina Ghelber	Hammer throw	69.61	17	Did not advance	
