= Romania at the 2015 World Championships in Athletics =

- WA code: ROM
- Website: fra.ro

in Beijing
- Competitors: 16
- Medals: Gold 0 Silver 0 Bronze 0 Total 0

World Championships in Athletics appearances
- 1983; 1987; 1991; 1993; 1995; 1997; 1999; 2001; 2003; 2005; 2007; 2009; 2011; 2013; 2015; 2017; 2019; 2022; 2023; 2025

Romania competed at the 2015 World Championships in Athletics in Beijing, China, from 22–30 August 2015.

== Results ==
(q – qualified, NM – no mark, SB – season best)

=== Men ===
Track and road events

Athlete	Event	Heat		Semifinal		Final	
Athlete	Event	Result	Rank	Result	Rank	Result	Rank
Marius Ionescu	Marathon	—N/a				DNF	
Marius Cocioran	50 kilometres walk	—N/a				DNF	

Field events

Athlete	Event	Qualification		Final	
Athlete	Event	Distance	Position	Distance	Position
Mihai Donisan	High jump	2.26	22	did not advance	
Marian Oprea	Triple jump	17.07 SB	3 q	17.06	6
Andrei Gag	Shot put	19.74	17	did not advance	

=== Women ===
Track and road events

Athlete	Event	Heat		Semifinal		Final	
Athlete	Event	Result	Rank	Result	Rank	Result	Rank
Bianca Răzor	400 metres	50.37 PB	2 Q	51.05	13	did not advance	
Florina Pierdevara	1500 metres	4:13.76	30	did not advance			
Paula Todoran	Marathon	—N/a				DNF	
Claudia Ștef	20 kilometres walk	—N/a				1:34:51	24
Bianca Răzor; Andreea Grecu; Anamaria Ioniță; Sanda Belgyan	4 × 400 metres relay	3:28.60 SB	11	—N/a		did not advance	

Field events

Athlete	Event	Qualification		Final	
Athlete	Event	Distance	Position	Distance	Position
Alina Rotaru	Long jump	6.58	15	did not advance	
Florentina Marincu	Long jump	NM		did not advance	
Cristina Bujin	Triple jump	13.21	25	did not advance	
Elena Panțuroiu	Triple jump	13.58	18	did not advance	
