= Romania at the 2022 World Athletics Championships =

- Flag of Romania
- WA code: ROU

in Eugene, United States 15 July 2022 – 24 July 2022
- Competitors: 8 (4 men and 4 women)
- Medals: Gold 0 Silver 0 Bronze 0 Total 0

World Athletics Championships appearances
- 1983; 1987; 1991; 1993; 1995; 1997; 1999; 2001; 2003; 2005; 2007; 2009; 2011; 2013; 2015; 2017; 2019; 2022; 2023; 2025

Romania competed at the 2022 World Athletics Championships in Eugene, United States, from 15 to 24 July 2022.

== Results ==
Romania entered 8 athletes.

Key

- Q = Qualified for the next round
- q = Qualified for the next round as a fastest loser or, in field events, by position without achieving the qualifying target
- NR = National record
- PB = Personal best
- SB = Season best
- N/A = Round not applicable for the event

=== Men ===
Track and road events

Athlete	Event	Heat		Semi-final		Final	
Athlete	Event	Result	Rank	Result	Rank	Result	Rank
Marius Cocioran	35 km walk	—N/a				2:43:27	38

Field events

Athlete	Event	Qualification		Final	
Athlete	Event	Distance	Position	Distance	Position
Andrei Toader	Shot put	19.83	18	Did not advance	
Alin Firfirică	Discus throw	65.54 SB	9 q	65.57 SB	7
Alexandru Novac	Javelin throw	75.20	25	Did not advance	

=== Women ===
Track and road events

Athlete	Event	Heat		Semi-final		Final	
Athlete	Event	Result	Rank	Result	Rank	Result	Rank
Mihaela Acatrinei	35 km walk	—N/a				DNF	–
Ana Veronica Rodean	35 km walk	—N/a				3:01:29 SB	26

Field events

Athlete	Event	Qualification		Final	
Athlete	Event	Distance	Position	Distance	Position
Daniela Stanciu	High jump	1.93 =SB	=6 q	1.93 =SB	10
Bianca Ghelber	Hammer throw	72.00	8 q	72.26	6
