= Romania at the 2013 World Championships in Athletics =

- WA code: ROM

in Moscow
- Competitors: 18
- Medals: Gold 0 Silver 0 Bronze 0 Total 0

World Championships in Athletics appearances
- 1983; 1987; 1991; 1993; 1995; 1997; 1999; 2001; 2003; 2005; 2007; 2009; 2011; 2013; 2015; 2017; 2019; 2022; 2023; 2025

Romania competed at the 2013 World Championships in Athletics in Moscow, Russia, from 10 to 18 August 2013. A team of 18 athletes was announced to represent the country in the event.

== Results ==
(q – qualified, NM – no mark, SB – season best)

=== Men ===
Track and road events

Athlete	Event	Preliminaries		Heats		Semifinals		Final	
Athlete	Event	Time	Rank	Time	Rank	Time	Rank	Time	Rank
Marius Ionescu	Marathon							2:18:31	26
Marius Cocioran	50 kilometres walk							4:04.58 SB	40

Field events

Athlete	Event	Preliminaries		Final	
Athlete	Event	Width Height	Rank	Width Height	Rank
Adrian Vasile	Long jump	7.52	25	did not advance	
Marian Oprea	Triple jump				
Mihai Donisan	High jump	2.26	16	did not advance	

=== Women ===
Track and road events

Athlete	Event	Preliminaries		Heats		Semifinals		Final	
Athlete	Event	Time	Rank	Time	Rank	Time	Rank	Time	Rank
Andreea Ograzeanu	200 metres			23.83	36	did not advance			
Bianca Răzor	400 metres			51.51 PB	13 Q	51.49 PB	13	did not advance	
Elena Mirela Lavric	800 metres			2:10.37	31	did not advance			
Ioana Doaga	1500 metres			4:09.78	26	did not advance			
Ancuta Bobocel	3000 metres steeplechase			9:35.78 SB	6 q			9:53.35	13
Sanda Belgyan; Camelia Florina Gal; Elena Mirela Lavric; Alina Andreea Panainte; Adelina Pastor; Bianca Răzor	4 × 400 metres relay			3:29.62	6 Q			3:28.40 SB	7
Simona Maxim	Marathon							did not start	

Field events

Athlete	Event	Preliminaries		Final	
Athlete	Event	Width Height	Rank	Width Height	Rank
Anca Heltne	Shot put	17.76	15	did not advance	
Nicoleta Grasu	Discus throw	56.31	22	did not advance	
Eliza Toader	Javelin throw	55.76	25	did not advance	
Bianca Perie	Hammer throw	71.32 SB	10 q	71.25	11
