= 2018 IAAF World Indoor Championships – Women's long jump =

Women's long jump at the 2018 IAAF World Indoor Championships
- Venue: Arena Birmingham
- Dates: 4 March
- Competitors: 13 from 11 nations
- Winning distance: 6.96 m

Medalists
gold medal	Ivana Španović	Serbia
silver medal	Brittney Reese	United States
bronze medal	Sosthene Moguenara	Germany

The women's long jump at the 2018 IAAF World Indoor Championships took place at Arena Birmingham in Birmingham, United Kingdom, on 4 March 2018.

== Summary ==
Brittney Reese entered the competition as defending champion and reigning world champion outdoors. She had won the 2018 USA Indoor Track and Field Championships with a jump of 6.88 m (22 ft 6 3/4 in), ranking third among jumpers before the event. Leading the world on distance was Serbia's Ivana Španović, with the European champion and 2016 World Indoor runner-up having cleared 6.93 m (22 ft 8 3/4 in). With just one centimetre less was emerging athlete Khaddi Sagnia, who had equalled the Swedish record in February. As winner of the IAAF World Indoor Tour, Germany's Sosthene Moguenara-Taroum received a wildcard entry.

Until the final jumper of the first round, Quanesha Burks's personal best 6.81m held the lead until Španović took the lead with a 6.89m. In the second round, Sosthene Moguenara moved into second place with a 6.85m which would be her best of the day. In the fourth round, the top two places were decided. First Reese moved into the lead by equalling Španović's 6.89m, also holding the better second best jump tiebreaker. Three jumpers later, Španović settled the matter with a 6.96 m (22 ft 10 in). The same top two medalist as in 2016, but in reverse order.

== Results ==
The final was started at 15:27.

Rank	Athlete	Nationality	#1	#2	#3	#4	#5	#6	Result	Notes
1st place, gold medalist(s)	Ivana Španović	Serbia	6.89	6.74	x	6.96	–	–	6.96	WL
2nd place, silver medalist(s)	Brittney Reese	United States	6.76	6.61	6.77	6.89	6.72	6.44	6.89	SB
3rd place, bronze medalist(s)	Sosthene Moguenara	Germany	6.59	6.85	x	6.31	6.23	6.30	6.85	SB
4	Quanesha Burks	United States	6.81	6.51	6.71	6.78	x	6.70	6.81	PB
5	Malaika Mihambo	Germany	6.43	6.40	6.55	x	6.64		6.64	
6	Khaddi Sagnia	Sweden	6.64	x	6.40	6.45	4.23		6.64	
7	Christabel Nettey	Canada	6.49	6.63	6.49	6.45	6.44		6.63	SB
8	Ksenija Balta	Estonia	6.46	6.48	6.26	6.50	6.57		6.57	
9	Alina Rotaru	Romania	x	6.37	6.41				6.41	
10	Maryna Bekh	Ukraine	x	6.37	6.35				6.37	
11	Lauma Grīva	Latvia	6.18	6.34	6.28				6.34	
12	Éloyse Lesueur	France	6.26	6.34	6.20				6.34	
13	Jessamyn Sauceda	Mexico	5.95	5.93	5.99				5.99	SB
