= Romania at the 2011 World Championships in Athletics =

- WA code: ROU
- National federation: Federatia Romana de Atletism
- Website: www.fra.ro

in Daegu
- Competitors: 8
- Medals: Gold 0 Silver 0 Bronze 0 Total 0

World Championships in Athletics appearances
- 1983; 1987; 1991; 1993; 1995; 1997; 1999; 2001; 2003; 2005; 2007; 2009; 2011; 2013; 2015; 2017; 2019; 2022; 2023

Romania competed at the 2011 World Championships in Athletics from August 27 to September 4 in Daegu, South Korea. A team of 8 athletes was announced to represent the country in the event. The team is led by triple jumper Marian Oprea and discus thrower Nicoleta Grasu who won the bronze medal in the last championships.

== Results ==
=== Men ===
Athlete	Event	Preliminaries		Heats		Semifinals		Final	
Athlete	Event	Time Width Height	Rank	Time Width Height	Rank	Time Width Height	Rank	Time Width Height	Rank
Marius Ionescu	Marathon							2:15:32 PB	13
Marian Oprea	Triple jump	16.61	15					Did not advance	

=== Women ===
Athlete	Event	Preliminaries		Heats		Semifinals		Final	
Athlete	Event	Time Width Height	Rank	Time Width Height	Rank	Time Width Height	Rank	Time Width Height	Rank
Andreea Ograzeanu	100 metres			11.46	32	Did not advance			
Cristina Casandra	3000 metres steeplechase			9:51.00	19			Did not advance	
Claudia Stef	20 kilometres walk							1:36:55	27
Esthera Petre	High jump	1.92	14					Did not advance	
Nicoleta Grasu	Discus throw	60.13 q	10					62.08	8
Bianca Perie	Hammer throw	69.66	11					72.04 SB	6
