= Romania at the 2019 World Athletics Championships =

Romania at the 2019 World Championships in Athletics
- WA code: ROU

in Doha
- Competitors: 10 (4 men and 6 women)
- Medals: Gold 0 Silver 0 Bronze 0 Total 0

World Championships in Athletics appearances
- 1983; 1987; 1991; 1993; 1995; 1997; 1999; 2001; 2003; 2005; 2007; 2009; 2011; 2013; 2015; 2017; 2019; 2022; 2023

Romania competed at the 2019 World Athletics Championships in Doha, Qatar, from 27 September–6 October 2019.

== Result ==
Key

- Note–Ranks given for track events are for the entire round
- Q = Qualified for the next round
- q = Qualified for the next round as a fastest loser or, in field events, by position without achieving the qualifying target
- NR = National record
- GR = Games record
- PB = Personal best
- SB = Season best
- DNF = Did not finish
- DNS = Did not start
- NM = No mark
- N/A = Round not applicable for the event
- Bye = Athlete not required to compete in round

=== Men ===
Track and road events

Athlete	Event	Heat		Semifinal		Final	
Athlete	Event	Result	Rank	Result	Rank	Result	Rank
Narcis Stefan Mihaila	50 km walk	—				4:13:56	10

Field events

Athlete	Event	Qualification		Final	
Athlete	Event	Distance	Position	Distance	Position
Andrei Gag	Shot put	20.50	17	Did not advance	
Alin Alexandru Firfirica	Discus throw	65.05	4 q	66.46	4
Alexandru Novac	Javelin throw	82.12	13	Did not advance	

=== Women ===
Track and road events

Athlete	Event	Heat		Semifinal		Final	
Athlete	Event	Result	Rank	Result	Rank	Result	Rank
Claudia Bobocea	1500 m	4:07.76	15 Q	4:18.25	24	Did not advance	

Field events

Athlete	Event	Qualification		Final	
Athlete	Event	Distance	Position	Distance	Position
Daniela Stanciu	High jump	1.85	24=	Did not advance	
Florentina Costina Iusco	Long jump	6.22	29	Did not advance	
Alina Rotaru	Long jump	6.72	5 q	6.71	6
Andreea Panturoiu	Triple jump	14.12	12 q	14.07	11
Bianca Florentina Ghelber	Hammer throw	68.65	18	Did not advance	
