= 2010 World Junior Championships in Athletics – Women's long jump =

The women's long jump event at the 2010 World Junior Championships in Athletics was held in Moncton, New Brunswick, Canada, at Moncton Stadium on 22 and 23 July.

== Medalists ==
Gold	Irisdaymi Herrera; Cuba
Silver	Wang Wupin; China
Bronze	Marharyta Tverdohlib; Ukraine

== Results ==
=== Final ===
23 July

Rank	Name	Nationality	Attempts						Result	Notes
Rank	Name	Nationality	1	2	3	4	5	6	Result	Notes
1st place, gold medalist(s)	Irisdaymi Herrera	Cuba	6.01 (w: -0.6 m/s)	6.30 (w: -0.6 m/s)	6.06 (w: -1.2 m/s)	5.79 (w: +0.7 m/s)	6.41 (w: +0.3 m/s)	6.17 (w: -0.1 m/s)	6.41 (w: +0.3 m/s)	
2nd place, silver medalist(s)	Wang Wupin	China	5.83 (w: -0.6 m/s)	6.11 (w: 0.0 m/s)	x	6.21 (w: +0.2 m/s)	5.91 (w: +0.2 m/s)	6.23 (w: +0.1 m/s)	6.23 (w: +0.1 m/s)	
3rd place, bronze medalist(s)	Marharyta Tverdohlib	Ukraine	5.79 (w: -0.1 m/s)	6.08 (w: +0.5 m/s)	6.07 (w: +0.3 m/s)	6.20 (w: 0.0 m/s)	6.18 (w: -0.4 m/s)	6.04 (w: 0.0 m/s)	6.20 (w: 0.0 m/s)	
4	Chantel Malone	British Virgin Islands	6.16 (w: -0.2 m/s)	6.17 (w: +0.1 m/s)	6.04 (w: +0.5 m/s)	6.15 (w: +1.0 m/s)	4.62 (w: +0.4 m/s)	5.88 (w: 0.0 m/s)	6.17 (w: +0.1 m/s)	
5	Anna Yermakova	Ukraine	5.73 (w: -0.6 m/s)	5.75 (w: 0.0 m/s)	6.01 (w: -0.4 m/s)	5.81 (w: -0.2 m/s)	6.06 (w: +0.7 m/s)	5.84 (w: 0.0 m/s)	6.06 (w: +0.7 m/s)	
6	Brooke Stratton	Australia	6.01 (w: -0.1 m/s)	5.94 (w: +0.2 m/s)	5.82 (w: +0.3 m/s)	5.83 (w: +0.6 m/s)	6.05 (w: +0.4 m/s)	5.90 (w: +0.1 m/s)	6.05 (w: +0.4 m/s)	
7	Marina Kraushofer	Austria	5.86 (w: -0.1 m/s)	6.04 (w: +0.1 m/s)	5.97 (w: +0.1 m/s)	x	x	6.00 (w: -0.1 m/s)	6.04 (w: +0.1 m/s)	
8	Sveinbjörg Zophoníasdóttir	Iceland	5.75 (w: -0.3 m/s)	5.75 (w: +0.1 m/s)	5.94 (w: -0.5 m/s)	5.61 (w: -0.1 m/s)	5.72 (w: +0.9 m/s)	5.54 (w: 0.0 m/s)	5.94 (w: -0.5 m/s)	
9	Meruska Eduarda	Netherlands Antilles	5.92 (w: +0.9 m/s)	5.93 (w: -0.4 m/s)	5.65 (w: -0.5 m/s)				5.93 (w: -0.4 m/s)	
10	Yekaterina Khalyutina	Russia	5.83 (w: -0.2 m/s)	5.88 (w: -0.1 m/s)	5.90 (w: +0.2 m/s)				5.90 (w: +0.2 m/s)	
11	Karynn Dunn	United States	5.83 (w: -0.6 m/s)	5.76 (w: -0.9 m/s)	5.76 (w: -1.0 m/s)				5.83 (w: -0.6 m/s)	
12	Darya Ahmedova	Uzbekistan	5.72 (w: 0.0 m/s)	5.43 (w: +0.2 m/s)	5.81 (w: 0.0 m/s)				5.81 (w: 0.0 m/s)	

=== Qualifications ===
22 July

==== Group A ====
Rank	Name	Nationality	Attempts			Result	Notes
Rank	Name	Nationality	1	2	3	Result	Notes
1	Irisdaymi Herrera	Cuba	6.02 (w: -0.7 m/s)	5.98 (w: -0.4 m/s)	5.42 (w: -0.2 m/s)	6.02 (w: -0.7 m/s)	q
2	Wang Wupin	China	5.82 w (w: +2.2 m/s)	x	5.89 (w: +0.4 m/s)	5.89 (w: +0.4 m/s)	q
3	Yekaterina Khalyutina	Russia	5.30 (w: +0.4 m/s)	5.79 (w: +1.4 m/s)	5.77 (w: -0.2 m/s)	5.79 (w: +1.4 m/s)	q
4	Meruska Eduarda	Netherlands Antilles	5.75 (w: +1.2 m/s)	5.67 (w: -0.2 m/s)	5.75 (w: +0.7 m/s)	5.75 (w: +1.2 m/s)	q
5	Darya Ahmedova	Uzbekistan	5.75 (w: +0.1 m/s)	5.69 (w: +1.4 m/s)	5.63 (w: +0.5 m/s)	5.75 (w: +0.1 m/s)	q
6	Anna Yermakova	Ukraine	x	5.65 (w: -0.2 m/s)	5.75 (w: +0.2 m/s)	5.75 (w: +0.2 m/s)	q
7	Andrea Geubelle	United States	5.63 (w: -0.1 m/s)	5.71 (w: +0.7 m/s)	5.37 (w: +1.0 m/s)	5.71 (w: +0.7 m/s)	
8	Caroline Ehrhardt	Canada	5.67 (w: 0.0 m/s)	5.59 (w: 0.0 m/s)	3.74 (w: +0.3 m/s)	5.67 (w: 0.0 m/s)	
9	Yekaterina Ektova	Kazakhstan	5.48 (w: +1.3 m/s)	5.49 (w: +0.3 m/s)	5.40 (w: +0.7 m/s)	5.49 (w: +0.3 m/s)	
10	Alina Rotaru	Romania	x	5.27 (w: +1.6 m/s)	4.90 (w: +0.3 m/s)	5.27 (w: +1.6 m/s)	

==== Group B ====
Rank	Name	Nationality	Attempts			Result	Notes
Rank	Name	Nationality	1	2	3	Result	Notes
1	Chantel Malone	British Virgin Islands	6.07 (w: +0.9 m/s)	5.99 (w: +1.0 m/s)	-	6.07 (w: +0.9 m/s)	q
2	Marharyta Tverdohlib	Ukraine	5.85 (w: +0.2 m/s)	5.86 (w: -0.6 m/s)	5.68 (w: +0.4 m/s)	5.86 (w: -0.6 m/s)	q
3	Marina Kraushofer	Austria	5.85 (w: +0.9 m/s)	5.83 (w: +0.5 m/s)	5.27 (w: +0.9 m/s)	5.85 (w: +0.9 m/s)	q
4	Karynn Dunn	United States	5.85 (w: +0.5 m/s)	5.67 (w: +0.3 m/s)	5.63 (w: -0.2 m/s)	5.85 (w: +0.5 m/s)	q
5	Brooke Stratton	Australia	5.84 (w: +0.6 m/s)	5.71 (w: +1.1 m/s)	x	5.84 (w: +0.6 m/s)	q
6	Sveinbjörg Zophoníasdóttir	Iceland	5.79 (w: +0.3 m/s)	5.78 (w: +0.2 m/s)	5.63 (w: -0.1 m/s)	5.79 (w: +0.3 m/s)	q
7	Mégane Beaufour	France	x	5.64 (w: +1.6 m/s)	x	5.64 (w: +1.6 m/s)	
8	Chanice Porter	Jamaica	5.15 (w: +0.1 m/s)	5.45 (w: +0.2 m/s)	5.56 (w: +0.5 m/s)	5.56 (w: +0.5 m/s)	
9	Lorraine Ugen	United Kingdom	x	x	5.56 (w: -0.5 m/s)	5.56 (w: -0.5 m/s)	
	Renubala Mahanta	India	x	x	4.37 (w: -1.1 m/s)	DQ	IAAF rule 32.2

== Participation ==
According to an unofficial count, 20 athletes from 18 countries participated in the event.

- Australia (1)
- Austria (1)
- British Virgin Islands (1)
- Canada (1)
- China (1)
- Cuba (1)
- France (1)
- Iceland (1)
- India (1)
- Jamaica (1)
- Kazakhstan (1)
- Netherlands Antilles (1)
- Romania (1)
- Russia (1)
- Ukraine (2)
- United Kingdom (1)
- United States (2)
- Uzbekistan (1)
