= Ukraine at the 2022 World Athletics Championships =

- Flag of Ukraine
- WA code: UKR
- National federation: Ukrainian Athletic Federation
- Website: https://uaf.org.ua/

in Eugene, United States 15–24 July 2022
- Competitors: 22 (4 men and 18 women) in 14 events
- Medals Ranked 31st: Gold 0 Silver 1 Bronze 1 Total 2

World Athletics Championships appearances
- 1993; 1995; 1997; 1999; 2001; 2003; 2005; 2007; 2009; 2011; 2013; 2015; 2017; 2019; 2022; 2023; 2025

Ukraine competed at the 2022 World Athletics Championships in Eugene, Oregon from 15 to 24 July 2022. Ukraine had entered 22 athletes.

== Medalists ==
Medal	Athlete	Event	Date
Silver	Yaroslava Mahuchikh	Women's high jump	19 July
Bronze	Andriy Protsenko	Men's high jump	18 July

== Results ==
Key

- Q = Qualified for the next round
- q = Not qualified for the next round as a fastest loser or, in field events, by position without achieving the qualifying target
- NR = National record
- PB = Personal best
- SB = Season best
- N/A = Round not applicable for the event

=== Men ===
Field events

Athlete	Event	Qualification		Final	
Athlete	Event	Distance	Position	Distance	Position
Andriy Protsenko	High jump	2.28	=1 q	2.33 SB	3rd place, bronze medalist(s)
Oleh Doroshchuk	High jump	2.25	15	Did not advance	
Roman Kokoshko	Shot put	20.02	15	Did not advance	
Mykhaylo Kokhan	Hammer throw	77.58	8 Q	78.83 SB	7

=== Women ===
Track and road events

Athlete	Event	Heat		Semifinal		Final	
Athlete	Event	Result	Rank	Result	Rank	Result	Rank
Olha Lyakhova	800 metres	2:02.16	28	Did not advance			
Anna Ryzhykova	400 metres hurdles	54.93	10 Q	54.51	12 Q	54.93	8
Viktoriya Tkachuk	400 metres hurdles	55.27	16 Q	54.24 SB	9	Did not advance	
Nataliya Strebkova	3000 metres steeplechase	9:25.85	22	Did not advance			
Anastasiia Bryzhina; Kateryna Karpyuk; Olha Lyakhova; Anna Ryzhykova; Maryana Shostak; Viktoriya Tkachuk	4 × 400 metres relay	3:29.25 SB	9	—N/a		Did not advance	
Olena Sobchuk	20 kilometres walk	—N/a				1:31:19	11
Lyudmila Olyanovska	20 kilometres walk	—N/a				1:31:42 SB	12
Hanna Shevchuk	20 kilometres walk	—N/a				DNF	
Nadiya Borovska	35 kilometres walk	—N/a				DNF	

Field events

Athlete	Event	Qualification		Final	
Athlete	Event	Distance	Position	Distance	Position
Iryna Gerashchenko	High jump	1.93	=1 q	2.00 PB	4
Yaroslava Mahuchikh	High jump	1.93	=1 q	2.02	2nd place, silver medalist(s)
Yuliya Levchenko	High jump	1.90	=15	Did not advance	
Maryna Kylypko	Pole vault	4.35	=16	Did not advance	
Yana Hladiychuk	Pole vault	4.35	22	Did not advance	
Maryna Bekh-Romanchuk	Long jump	6.81	4 Q	6.82	8
Maryna Bekh-Romanchuk	Triple jump	14.54	2 Q	13.91	11
Iryna Klymets	Hammer throw	68.12	22	Did not advance	
