= 2015 European Athletics Indoor Championships – Women's long jump =

The women's long jump event at the 2015 European Athletics Indoor Championships was held on 6 March 2015 at 12:15 (qualification) and 7 March, 16:45 (final) local time.

== Medalists ==
Gold	Silver	Bronze
Ivana Španović; Serbia	Sosthene Taroum Moguenara; Germany	Florentina Marincu; Romania

== Records ==
Standing records prior to the 2015 European Athletics Indoor Championships
World record	Heike Drechsler (GDR)	7.37	Vienna, Austria	13 February 1988
European record	Heike Drechsler (GDR)	7.37	Vienna, Austria	13 February 1988
Championship record	Heike Drechsler (GDR)	7.30	Budapest, Hungary	5 March 1988
World Leading	Christabel Nettey (CAN)	6.99	Stockholm, Sweden	19 February 2015
European Leading	Katarina Johnson-Thompson (GBR)	6.92	Birmingham, Great Britain	21 February 2015

== Results ==
=== Qualification ===
Qualification: Qualification Performance 6.65 (Q) or at least 8 best performers advanced to the final.

Rank	Athlete	Nationality	#1	#2	#3	Result	Note
1	Ivana Španović	Serbia	6.76			6.76	Q
2	Sosthene Taroum Moguenara	Germany	6.72			6.72	Q, SB
3	Alina Rotaru	Romania	6.55	6.59	6.33	6.59	q
4	Éloyse Lesueur	France	6.59	x	–	6.59	q
5	Florentina Marincu	Romania	6.57	6.42	6.57	6.57	q
6	Aiga Grabuste	Latvia	5.95	6.51	6.57	6.57	q
7	Karin Melis Mey	Turkey	6.57	6.49	6.48	6.57	q
8	Melanie Bauschke	Germany	6.53	6.44	6.32	6.53	q
9	Khaddi Sagnia	Sweden	6.52	x	6.42	6.52	
10	Nastassia Mironchyk-Ivanova	Belarus	6.50	x	x	6.50	
11	Erica Jarder	Sweden	6.23	6.12	6.49	6.49	
12	Hafdís Sigurdardóttir	Iceland	6.32	6.18	6.35	6.35	
13	Nina Đorđević	Slovenia	6.16	6.23	6.30	6.30	
14	Xenia Achkinadze	Germany	6.09	x	6.29	6.29	
15	Jana Velďáková	Slovakia	x	6.29	x	6.29	
16	Maryna Bekh	Ukraine	6.27	6.15	x	6.27	
17	Laura Strati	Italy	6.18	6.22	6.09	6.22	
18	Lucia Slaničková	Slovakia	6.17	6.01	x	6.17	
19	Nadia Akpana Assa	Norway	x	6.08	5.95	6.08	
20	Renáta Medgyesová	Slovakia	x	6.04	5.70	6.04	
21	Maiko Gogoladze	Georgia	5.88	x	x	5.88	
22	Claudia Guri	Andorra	5.46	5.32	x	5.46	

=== Final ===
Rank	Athlete	Nationality	#1	#2	#3	#4	#5	#6	Result	Note
1st place, gold medalist(s)	Ivana Španović	Serbia	6.80	x	6.98	6.89	6.71	6.81	6.98	NR, EL
2nd place, silver medalist(s)	Sosthene Taroum Moguenara	Germany	6.83	x	x	6.55	x	6.61	6.83	SB
3rd place, bronze medalist(s)	Florentina Marincu	Romania	x	6.70	6.59	6.60	6.79	x	6.79	EJR
4	Alina Rotaru	Romania	x	6.74	6.50	6.53	6.69	x	6.74	PB
5	Éloyse Lesueur	France	x	x	x	6.66	6.73	6.57	6.73	
6	Melanie Bauschke	Germany	6.59	x	6.48	6.57	6.45	6.39	6.59	
7	Karin Melis Mey	Turkey	x	6.57	x	6.45	6.42	6.50	6.57	
8	Aiga Grabuste	Latvia	6.54	x	x	x	6.41	6.36	6.54	
