= 2021 European Athletics Indoor Championships – Women's long jump =

The women's long jump event at the 2021 European Athletics Indoor Championships was held on 5 March at 12:18 (qualification) and 6 March at 19:40 (final) local time.

== Medalists ==
Gold	Silver	Bronze
Maryna Bekh-Romanchuk; Ukraine	Malaika Mihambo; Germany	Khaddi Sagnia; Sweden

== Records ==
Standing records prior to the 2021 European Athletics Indoor Championships
World record	Heike Drechsler (GDR)	7.37	Vienna, Austria	13 February 1988
European record	Heike Drechsler (GDR)	7.37	Vienna, Austria	13 February 1988
Championship record	Heike Drechsler (GDR)	7.30	Budapest, Hungary	5 March 1988
World Leading	Larissa Iapichino (ITA)	6.91	Ancona, Italy	20 February 2021
European Leading	Larissa Iapichino (ITA)	6.91	Ancona, Italy	20 February 2021

== Results ==
=== Qualification ===
Qualification: Qualifying performance 6.70 (Q) or at least 8 best performers (q) advance to the Final.

Rank	Athlete	Nationality	#1	#2	#3	Result	Note
1	Khaddi Sagnia	Sweden	x	6.58	6.78	6.78	Q
2	Larissa Iapichino	Italy	6.35	6.42	6.70	6.70	Q
3	Maryna Bekh-Romanchuk	Ukraine	6.60	6.66	–	6.66	q
4	Fátima Diame	Spain	x	6.62	x	6.62	q, PB
5	Malaika Mihambo	Germany	6.41	6.47	6.58	6.58	q
6	Laura Strati	Italy	6.58	6.44	6.44	6.58	q
7	Florentina Iusco	Romania	x	6.57	x	6.57	q, SB
8	Nastassia Mironchyk-Ivanova	Belarus	6.49	6.52	6.55	6.55	q
9	Jogailė Petrokaitė	Lithuania	6.50	6.36	6.53	6.53	PB
10	Alina Rotaru-Kottmann	Romania	x	6.38	6.53	6.53	SB
11	Merle Homeier	Germany	4.62	6.50	6.41	6.50	
12	Maryse Luzolo	Germany	6.44	6.47	6.48	6.48	
13	Jazmin Sawyers	Great Britain	6.27	6.46	6.48	6.48	
14	Filippa Fotopoulou	Cyprus	6.41	6.39	6.46	6.46	
15	Abigail Irozuru	Great Britain	x	6.44	6.39	6.44	SB
16	Diana Lesti	Hungary	x	6.18	6.17	6.18	
17	Claire Azzopardi	Malta	x	5.44	5.51	5.51	PB

=== Final ===
Rank	Athlete	Nationality	#1	#2	#3	#4	#5	#6	Result	Note
1st place, gold medalist(s)	Maryna Bekh-Romanchuk	Ukraine	x	x	6.80	6.62	6.86	6.92	6.92	WL
2nd place, silver medalist(s)	Malaika Mihambo	Germany	6.60	6.56	6.88	6.56	6.69	6.78	6.88	SB
3rd place, bronze medalist(s)	Khaddi Sagnia	Sweden	6.48	x	6.75	x	6.62	x	6.75	
4	Nastassia Mironchyk-Ivanova	Belarus	6.44	x	6.72	6.71	x	6.72	6.72	
5	Larissa Iapichino	Italy	6.59	6.56	x	6.48	6.34	6.56	6.59	
6	Laura Strati	Italy	x	6.41	x	6.57	6.38	6.48	6.57	
7	Fátima Diame	Spain	6.35	x	x	6.47	x	6.35	6.47	
8	Florentina Iusco	Romania	x	x	6.33	6.33	6.36	6.38	6.38	
