= Romania at the 2009 World Championships in Athletics =

- WA code: ROU

in Berlin
- Competitors: 17
- Medals: Gold 0 Silver 0 Bronze 1 Total 1

World Championships in Athletics appearances
- 1983; 1987; 1991; 1993; 1995; 1997; 1999; 2001; 2003; 2005; 2007; 2009; 2011; 2013; 2015; 2017; 2019; 2022; 2023; 2025

Romania competed at the 2009 World Championships in Athletics from 15 to 23 August. A team of 17 athletes was announced in preparation for the competition. Selected athletes have achieved one of the competition's qualifying standards.

== Medalists ==
Medal	Name	Event
Bronze	Nicoleta Grasu	Women's discus throw

== Points table ==
Athletes	Event	Place	Points
Monica Stoian	Javelin throw	4	5
Cristina Bujin	Triple Jump	7	2
Angela Moroșanu	400 m hurdles	8	1
Nicoleta Grasu	Discus throw	3	6
Total			14

== Team selection ==
Track and road events

Event	Athletes	
Event	Men	Women
200 metres		Andreea Ogrăzeanu
400 meters hurdles		Angela Moroșanu
800 metres		Elena Mirela Lavric
3000 m steeplechase		Cristina Casandra; Ancuța Bobocel
20 kilometres walk		Claudia Stef; Ana Maria Groza; Ana Maria Greceanu
Marathon		Luminița Talpoș; Lidia Șimon; Nuţa Olaru

Field and combined events

Event	Athletes	
Event	Men	Women
Triple jump		Cristina Bujin
Shot put		Anca Heltne
Discus throw		Nicoleta Grasu
Hammer throw		Bianca Perie
Javelin throw		Monica Stoian; Maria Nicoleta Negoita

== Results ==
=== Women ===
Track and road events

Event	Athletes	Heat Round 1		Quarter-final		Semifinal		Final	
Event	Athletes	Result	Rank	Result	Rank	Result	Rank	Result	Rank
200 m	Andreea Ogrăzeanu	23.42	27	Did not advance					
400 m hurdles	Angela Moroșanu	54.70	2 Q			54.15	3 q	55.04	8
800 m	Elena Mirela Lavric	2:04.49	26			Did not advance			
3000 m steeplechase	Ancuța Bobocel	9:34.39 SB	17					Did not advance	
3000 m steeplechase	Cristina Casandra	9:49.88	33					Did not advance	
20 km walk	Claudia Stef							1:36.09	23
20 km walk	Ana Maria Groza							1:35.19	16
20 km walk	Anamaria Greceanu							1:43.35	34
Marathon	Luminița Talpoș							Did not start	
Marathon	Lidia Șimon							2:32:03	22
Marathon	Nuţa Olaru							3:00:59	60

Field events

Event	Athletes	Qualification		Final	
Event	Athletes	Result	Rank	Result	Rank
Triple jump	Cristina Bujin	14.29	7 q	14.26	7
Shot put	Anca Heltne	17.92	15	Did not advance	
Discus throw	Nicoleta Grasu	61.78	8 Q	65.20	Bronze medal
Javelin throw	Monica Stoian	60.29	8q	64.51	4
Javelin throw	Maria Nicoleta Negoita	59.46	12 q	57.65	10
Hammer throw	Bianca Perie	68.47	19	Did not advance	
