= Michel Butter =

Dutch long-distance runner (born 1985)

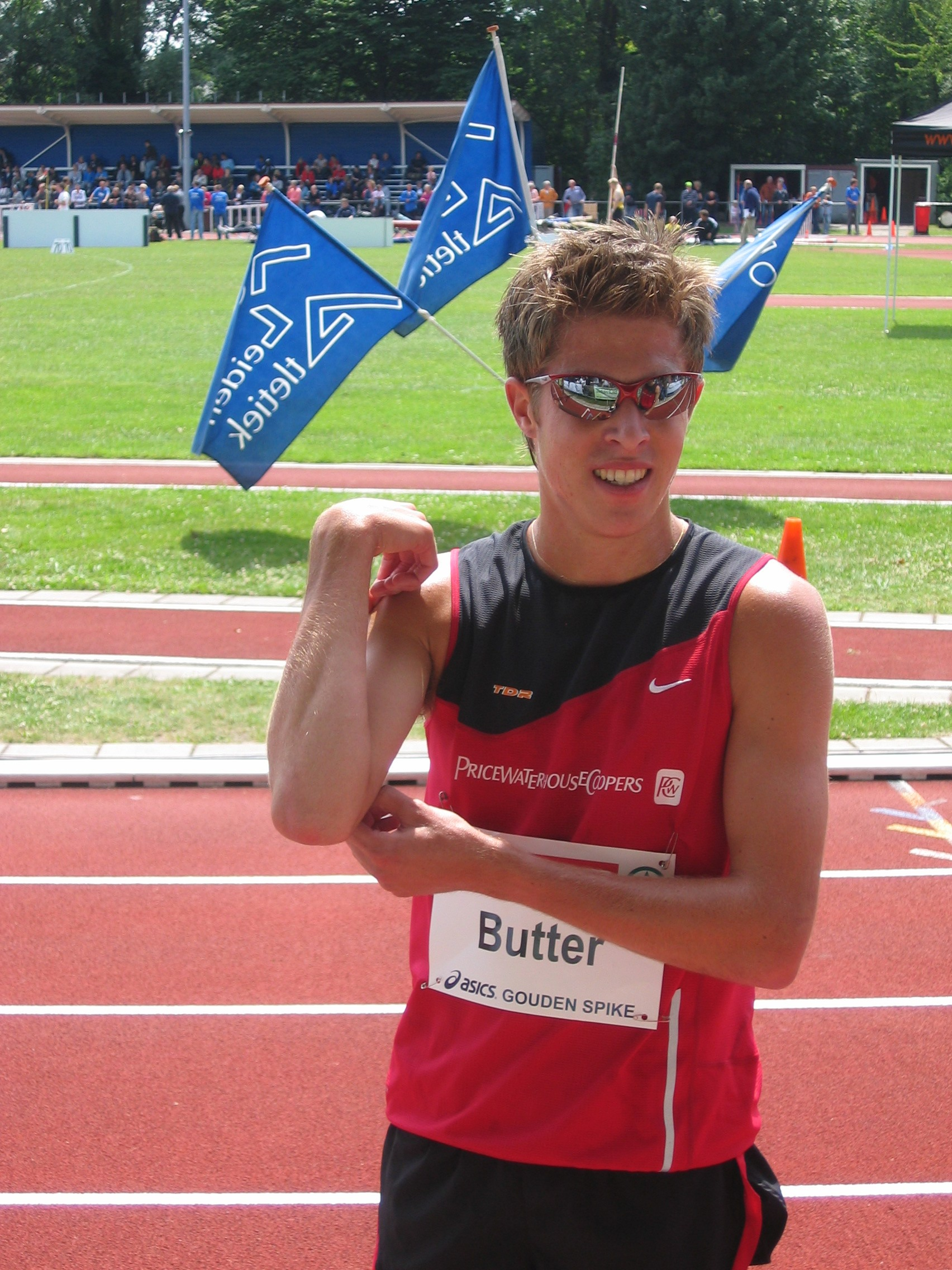
- Michel Butter at the 2008 Gouden Spike Meeting in Leiden, The Netherlands

Personal information
- Full name: Michel Butter
- Born: 5 November 1985 (age 40) Beverwijk, Netherlands
- Years active: 2000-present
- Height: 1.76 m (5 ft 9 in)
- Weight: 61 kg (134 lb)

Achievements and titles
- Personal bests: 1500 metres – 3:42.66 (2009); 3000 metres – 7:59.80 (2009); 5000 metres – 13:37.33 (2009); 10,000 metres – 28:38.70 (2010); 10 km – 28:48.00 (2008); 10 miles – 47:52 (2012) half marathon – 1:02:25 (2013)
- Updated on 9 September 2009

Michel Butter (born 5 November 1985) is a Dutch long-distance runner.

He was the silver medallist over 10,000 metres at the 2007 European Athletics U23 Championships and represented his country at the 2008 European Cross Country Championships, coming ninth in the senior men's race. Butter was the winner of the Tilburg Warandeloop in 2008 and won the half marathon at the 2009 Berenloop road race. He was 16th in the race at the 2010 European Cross Country Championships.

He made his marathon debut at the 2011 Utrecht Marathon and won on his first attempt with a time of 2:17:35 hours. The race was reduced to a national level event that year as prize money was directly solely to Dutch runners. He significantly improved his best time at the 2011 Amsterdam Marathon, where his time of 2:12:59 hours brought him the Dutch national title and 15th position overall. At the 2012 Boston Marathon, he was seventh and the top European in a race slowed by hot conditions. In the 2012 Amsterdam Marathon, he took 12th place, in a new personal best of 2:09:58 hours.

== Career highlights ==
=== International achievements ===
| Year | Competition | Venue | Position | Event | Notes |
Representing the Netherlands
| 2003 | European Cross Country Championships | Edinburgh, Scotland | 67th | Junior men individual 6.595 km | 22:30 |
| 2004 | European Cross Country Championships | Heringsdorf, Germany | 70th | Junior men individual 5.64 km | 17:37 |
| 2004 | World Cross Country Championships | Brussels, Belgium | 85th | Junior Race Men 8 km | 27:51 |
| 2005 | European U23 Championships | Erfurt, Germany | 15th | 10,000m | 30:44.86 |
| 2005 | European Cross Country Championships | Tilburg, The Netherlands | 65th | Men individual 9.84 km | 28:59 |
| 2006 | European Cross Country Championships | San Giorgio su Legnano, Italy | 15th | Men U23 individual 8.03 km | 23:35 |
| 2007 | European U23 Championships | Debrecen, Hungary | 2nd | 10,000m | 29:12.95 |
| 2007 | European Cross Country Championships | Toro, Spain | 16th | Men U23 individual 8.2 km | 25:05 |
| 2008 | European Cross Country Championships | Brussels, Belgium | 9th | Men individual 10 km | 31:30 |

=== National achievements ===
Dutch National Championships
2004 - 1st, 5,000 m (juniors)
2004 - 1st, cross-country (juniors)
2006 - Schoorl, 2nd, 10,000 m
2006 - The Hague, 2nd, Half marathon
2007 - 1st, cross-country
2007 - 1st, 10,000 m
2007 - Amsterdam, 1st, 5,000 m (track)
2008 - Gilze en Rijen, 1st, cross-country
2008 - The Hague, 1st, Half marathon
2008 - 1st, 10,000 m
2009 - Amsterdam, 1st, 5,000 m (track)
2011 - Amsterdam Marathon, 1st Dutch (15th)

== Personal bests ==
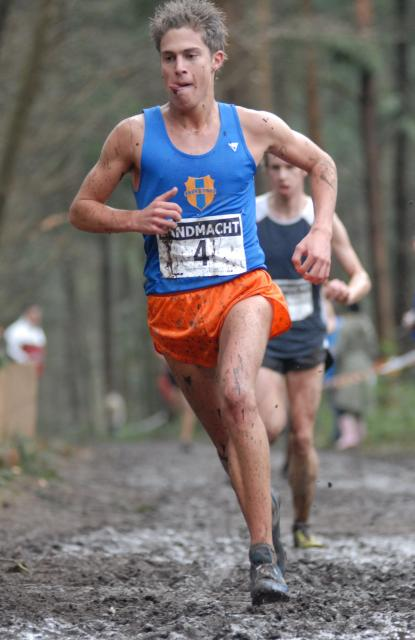
Butter at the Dutch cross country championships

Track

| Distance | Mark | Date | Location |
|---|---|---|---|
| 1,500 m | 3:42.66 | August 31, 2009 | Antwerp |
| 3,000 m | 7:59.80 | June 13, 2009 | Leiden |
| 5,000 m | 13:37.33 | July 18, 2009 | Heusden |
| 10,000 m | 28:38.70 | March 26, 2010 | Palo Alto |

Road

| Distance | Mark | Date | Location |
|---|---|---|---|
| 10,000 m | 28:48 | February 10, 2008 | Schoorl |
| 10 Eng. miles | 48:47 | September 23, 2007 | Zaandam |
| Half marathon | 1:02:33 | March 11, 2012 | The Hague |
| Marathon | 2:09:58 | October 21, 2012 | Amsterdam |
