= 2005 European Athletics U23 Championships – Men's 10,000 metres =

The men's 10,000 metres event at the 2005 European Athletics U23 Championships was held in Erfurt, Germany, at Steigerwaldstadion on 15 July.

== Medalists ==
Gold	Yevgeniy Rybakov; Russia
Silver	André Pollmächer; Germany
Bronze	Marius Ionescu; Romania

== Results ==
=== Final ===
15 July

Rank	Name	Nationality	Time	Notes
1st place, gold medalist(s)	Yevgeniy Rybakov	Russia	29:30.76	
2nd place, silver medalist(s)	André Pollmächer	Germany	29:33.22	
3rd place, bronze medalist(s)	Marius Ionescu	Romania	29:34.52	
4	Martin Fagan	Ireland	29:39.20	
5	Stefan Koch	Germany	29:39.65	
6	Antony Ford	United Kingdom	29:47.45	
7	Marc Roig	Spain	30:07.99	
8	Francesco Bona	Italy	30:12.14	
9	Alberto Montorio	Italy	30:23.95	
10	Abdil Ceylan	Turkey	30:28.97	
11	Rubén Losada	Spain	30:34.31	
12	Jesper Faurschou	Denmark	30:38.16	
13	Sabri Kara	Turkey	30:42.10	
14	Daniele Meucci	Italy	30:43.41	
15	Michel Butter	Netherlands	30:44.86	
16	Sergey Ryazantsev	Russia	30:46.31	
17	Viktors Sļesarenoks	Latvia	30:55.66	
18	Janusz Put	Poland	31:00.31	
19	Florian Prüller	Austria	31:03.11	
20	Balázs Ott	Hungary	31:07.41	

== Participation ==
According to an unofficial count, 20 athletes from 14 countries participated in the event.

- Austria (1)
- Denmark (1)
- Germany (2)
- Hungary (1)
- Ireland (1)
- Italy (3)
- Latvia (1)
- Netherlands (1)
- Poland (1)
- Romania (1)
- Russia (2)
- Spain (2)
- Turkey (2)
- United Kingdom (1)
