= Brittney Reese =

American long jumper

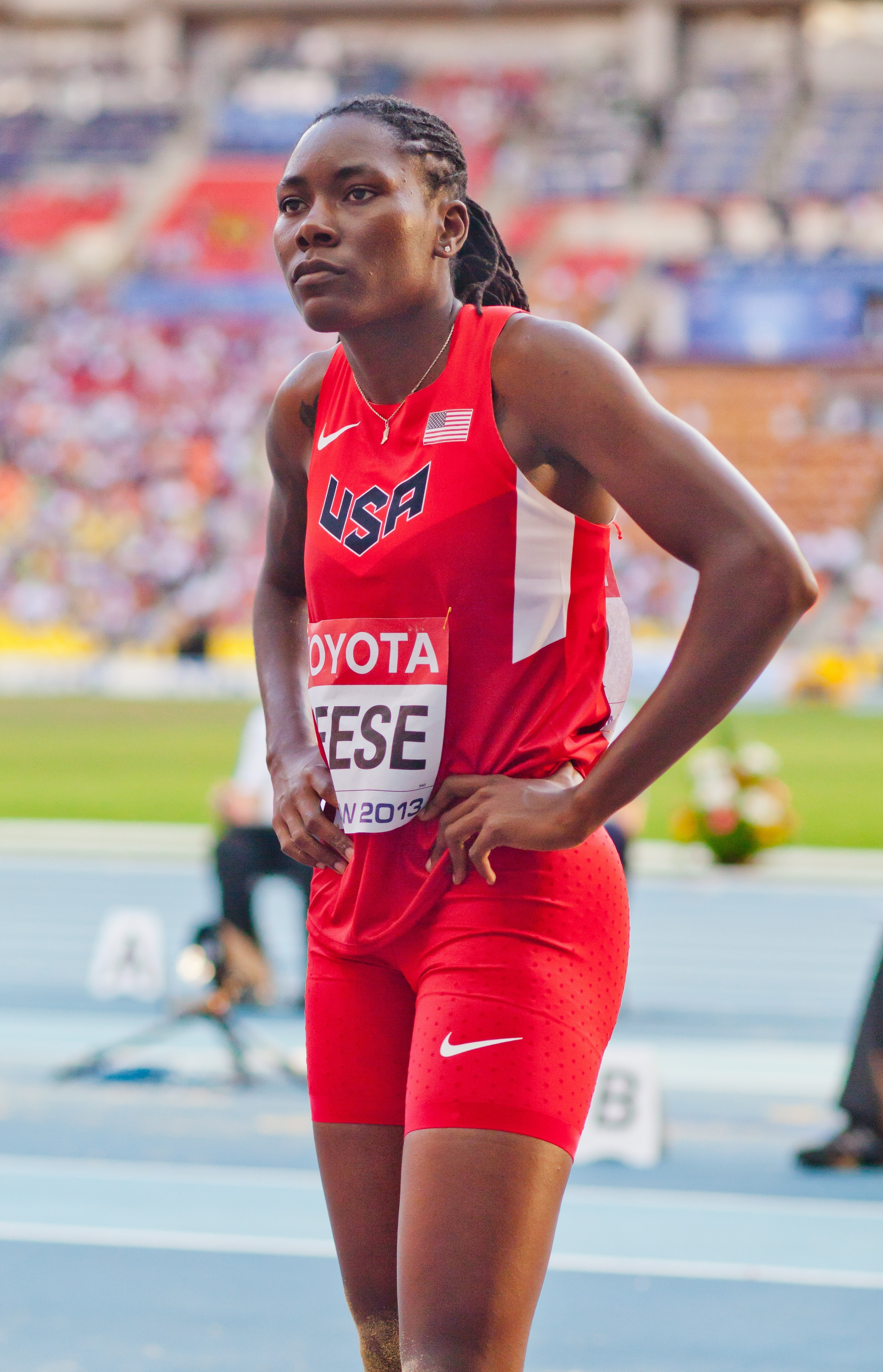
- Reese in 2013

Personal information
- Full name: Brittney Davon Reese
- Born: September 9, 1986 (age 40) Inglewood, California, U.S.
- Home town: Gulfport, Mississippi, U.S.
- Agent: Mark Pryor
- Height: 5 ft 8 in (173 cm)
- Weight: 140 lb (64 kg)

Sport
- Country: United States
- Sport: Track and field
- Event: Long jump
- College team: Ole Miss
- Club: Nike
- Turned pro: June 2008

Achievements and titles
- Personal bests: Outdoor; Long jump: 7.31 m (23 ft 11 3/4 in) (Eugene 2016); Indoor; Long jump: 7.23 m (23 ft 8 1/2 in) AR (Istanbul 2012)
Medal record
Event	1st	2nd	3rd
Olympic Games	1	2	0
World Championships	4	0	0
World Indoor Championships	3	1	0
Total	8	3	0
Olympic Games
Gold medal – first place	2012 London	Long jump
Silver medal – second place	2016 Rio de Janeiro	Long jump
Silver medal – second place	2020 Tokyo	Long jump
World Championships
Gold medal – first place	2009 Berlin	Long jump
Gold medal – first place	2011 Daegu	Long jump
Gold medal – first place	2013 Moscow	Long jump
Gold medal – first place	2017 London	Long jump
World Indoor Championships
Gold medal – first place	2010 Doha	Long jump
Gold medal – first place	2012 Istanbul	Long jump
Gold medal – first place	2016 Portland	Long jump
Silver medal – second place	2018 Birmingham	Long jump

Brittney Davon Reese (born September 9, 1986) is a retired American long jumper, Olympic gold medalist, and a seven-time world champion. Reese is the indoor American record holder in the long jump with a distance of 7.23 meters.

== Personal life ==
Born in Inglewood, California, Reese was a 2004 graduate of Gulfport High School in Gulfport, Mississippi, where she became state champion in the long jump and triple jump. She later attended MGCCC and the University of Mississippi. Reese was a member of the women's basketball team at MGCCC and was recently inducted into their sports Hall of Fame.

Reese has been assistant track and field coach at San Diego Mesa College since 2013.

== Career ==
She was the NCAA Outdoor Champion in long jump in 2007 and 2008. Reese set a personal best in the long jump of 22 feet 9.75 inches (6.95 meters) in July 2008 in Eugene, Oregon at the U.S. Olympic Trials to qualify for the 2008 Summer Olympics in Beijing. At the Olympics, Reese had the best qualifying jump at 6.87 meters. However, Reese placed fifth in the final, with a jump of 6.76 meters.

On May 24, 2009, in Belém, Reese extended her personal best to 7.06 m (0.7 m/s wind). This brought her to third on the American all-time list, behind Marion Jones and Jackie Joyner-Kersee.

At the 2009 World Athletics Championships, in Berlin, Reese won the long jump title with a jump of 7.10 meters, beating defending champion Tatyana Lebedeva. Reese is the third youngest champion in the history of the event.

At the 2010 IAAF World Indoor Championships, Reese won the gold medal in the long jump with a jump of 6.70 meters.

At the 2011 World Championships in Athletics, Reese successfully retained the gold medal in the long jump with a jump of 6.82 meters.

At the 2012 IAAF World Indoor Championships, Reese successfully retained the gold medal in the long jump with a jump of 7.23 meters. She became the first woman to win back-to-back World indoor titles in the long jump when she landed a 7.23 m last round effort, the longest mark indoors since 1989, a new American record and third on the all-time indoor lists. At the start of the outdoor season she broke Carol Lewis' long-standing meet record at the Mt SAC Relays with a jump of 7.12 m. That year, she also won the Olympic gold medal, with another jump of 7.12 m.

Reese won her third consecutive long jump world outdoor title at the 2013 World Championships in Moscow with a jump of 7.01m, beating Blessing Okagbare narrowly by 2 cm.

== Philanthropy ==
On November 14, 2011, Reese donated 100 turkeys and her time to various homeless and religious organizations in her community of Gulfport, Mississippi as her way of "giving back" to the community that has supported her throughout her athletic career. She wanted to make Thanksgiving a little easier, in an area where there are few resources for those in need.

On October 26, 2012, in conjunction with the Gulfport School District celebrating "Brittney Reese Day"; Reese created the B. Reese Scholarship which will be awarded annually to 1 male & 1 female student who has been accepted to a 2-year or 4-year college.

On May 21, 2013, the Reese Scholarship was awarded in Baltimore County Public Schools to a deserving student accepted to college or university who participated in the Allied Sports Program, coordinated by the Office of Athletics Director Michael Sye. The 2014 recipient of the scholarship is Bailey Weinkam, a Catonsville High School student that was born hearing impaired. Ms. Weinkam will attend Community College of Baltimore County in Fall 2014.

== Major competition record ==
Year	Competition	Venue	Position	Event	Notes
Representing the United States
2007	World Championships	Osaka, Japan	8th	Long jump	6.60 m (21 ft 7 3/4 in)
2008	Olympic Games	Beijing, China	5th	Long jump	6.76 m (22 ft 2 in)
2009	World Championships	Berlin, Germany	1st	Long jump	7.10 m (23 ft 3 1/2 in)
2010	World Indoor Championships	Doha, Qatar	1st	Long jump	6.70 m (21 ft 11 3/4 in)
2011	World Championships	Daegu, South Korea	1st	Long jump	6.82 m (22 ft 4 1/2 in)
2012	World Indoor Championships	Istanbul, Turkey	1st	Long jump	7.23 m (23 ft 8 1/2 in)
2012	Olympic Games	London, United Kingdom	1st	Long jump	7.12 m (23 ft 4 1/4 in)
2013	World Championships	Moscow, Russia	1st	Long jump	7.01 m (22 ft 11 3/4 in)
2015	World Championships	Beijing, China	24th (q)	Long jump	6.39 m (20 ft 11 1/2 in)
2016	World Indoor Championships	Portland, United States	1st	Long jump	7.22 m (23 ft 8 1/4 in)
2016	Olympic Games	Rio de Janeiro, Brazil	2nd	Long jump	7.15 m (23 ft 5 1/4 in)
2017	World Championships	London, United Kingdom	1st	Long jump	7.02 m (23 ft 1/4 in)
2018	World Indoor Championships	Birmingham, United Kingdom	2nd	Long jump	6.89 m (22 ft 7 1/4 in)
2019	World Championships	Doha, Qatar	13th (q)	Long jump	6.52 m (21 ft 4 1/2 in)
2021	Olympic Games	Tokyo, Japan	2nd	Long jump	6.97 m (22 ft 10 1/4 in)

== Personal bests ==
Event	Best (m)	Venue	Date	Note(s)
Long jump (outdoor)	7.31 +1.7	Eugene	July 2, 2016	= #9 all time
Long jump (indoor)	7.23	Istanbul	March 11, 2012	AR, NR, 4th of all time

- All information taken from IAAF profile.

Sporting positions
Preceded by (Portugal) Naide Gomes	Women's long jump Best year performance 2009	Succeeded by (Russia) Olga Kucherenko
Preceded by (Russia) Olga Kucherenko	Women's long jump Best year performance 2011–2013	Succeeded by (United States) Tianna Bartoletta
