= Christian Glatting =

German long-distance runner (born 1986)

Christian Glatting (born 28 December 1986) is a German long distance runner.

== Achievements ==
Year	Competition	Venue	Position	Event	Notes
Representing Germany
2007	European U23 Championships	Debrecen, Hungary	—	10,000m	DNF
2010	European Championships	Barcelona, Spain	9th	10,000 m	29:09.84
