= Marharyta Tverdokhlib =

Ukrainian long jumper (born 1991)

Marharyta Tverdokhlib (Ukrainian: Маргарита Твердохліб; born 2 June 1991) is a Ukrainian long jumper.

== Career ==
She competed in the long jump event at the 2012 Summer Olympics.

In November 2016, it was announced retests of the samples taken from the 2012 Olympics indicated that Tverdokhlib had tested positive for prohibited substances. The IOC Disciplinary Commission disqualified Tverdokhlib from the Olympic Games 2012.

In May 2017, she was disqualified for two years.

== Competition record ==
Year	Competition	Venue	Position	Event	Notes
Representing Ukraine
2010	World Junior Championships	Moncton, Canada	3rd	Long jump	6.20 m (wind: 0.0 m/s)
2011	European U23 Championships	Ostrava, Czech Republic	14th (q)	Long jump	6.03 m (wind: -0.4 m/s)
2012	European Championships	Helsinki, Finland	6th (q)	Long jump	6.53 m
2012	Olympic Games	London, United Kingdom	DSQ (26th)	Long jump	6.19 m
2013	European U23 Championships	Tampere, Finland	DSQ (9th)	Long jump	6.28 m (wind: +1.0 m/s)
2014	European Championships	Zürich, Switzerland	15th (q)	Long jump	6.31 m
