= Martin Fagan =

Irish long-distance runner

Martin Fagan (born 26 June 1983 in Mullingar) is a retired Irish long distance runner, who specialised in half-marathons and marathons.

Fagan competed for the Providence Friars track and field team in the NCAA.

In 2012 he was banned for two years after testing positive for the banned performance-enhancing blood-boosting drug EPO. He made a comeback in early 2014 and managed to qualify for the marathon at the 2016 Summer Olympics, but announced in June 2015 that he had decided in to retire from running.

== Achievements ==
Year	Competition	Venue	Position	Event	Notes
Representing Ireland
2005	European U23 Championships	Erfurt, Germany	5th	5000m	14:16.28
2005	European U23 Championships	Erfurt, Germany	4th	10,000m	29:39.20
2006	European Championships	Gothenburg, Sweden	11th	10,000 m	28:54.04
2008	Summer Olympics	Beijing, China	—	Marathon	DNF
