= 2007 European Athletics U23 Championships – Men's 10,000 metres =

Sport event

The men's 10,000 metres event at the 2007 European Athletics U23 Championships was held in Debrecen, Hungary, at Gyulai István Atlétikai Stadion on 14 July.

== Medalists ==
Gold	Anatoliy Rybakov; Russia
Silver	Michel Butter; Netherlands
Bronze	Daniele Meucci; Italy

== Results ==
=== Final ===
14 July

Rank	Name	Nationality	Time	Notes
1st place, gold medalist(s)	Anatoliy Rybakov	Russia	29:09.89	
2nd place, silver medalist(s)	Michel Butter	Netherlands	29:12.95	
3rd place, bronze medalist(s)	Daniele Meucci	Italy	29:18.26	
4	Dušan Markešević	Serbia	29:27.61	
5	Sergey Rybin	Russia	29:35.83	
6	Zelalem Martel	Germany	29:45.84	
7	Artur Kozłowski	Poland	29:48.20	
8	Arkadiusz Gardzielewski	Poland	29:51.28	
9	Muğdat Öztürk	Turkey	29:54.66	
10	Stsiapan Rahautsou	Belarus	30:02.76	
11	Fatih Bilgiç	Turkey	30:28.08	
12	Denis Mayaud	France	30:33.87	
13	Nuno Costa	Portugal	30:37.40	
14	Carlos Gazapo	Spain	30:43.22	
15	Kári Steinn Karlsson	Iceland	30:51.51	
16	Henry Gross	Sweden	30:51.84	
17	Viktors Sļesarenoks	Latvia	31:19.00	
18	António Silva	Portugal	31:21.19	
19	Andrew Ledwith	Ireland	31:39.24	
20	Michael Brandenbourg	Belgium	32:01.26	
21	Damian Witkowski	Poland	32:08.26	
	Pierrot Pantel	France	DNF	
	Kemal Koyuncu	Turkey	DNF	
	Christian Glatting	Germany	DNF	

== Participation ==
According to an unofficial count, 24 athletes from 16 countries participated in the event.

- Belarus (1)
- Belgium (1)
- France (2)
- Germany (2)
- Iceland (1)
- Ireland (1)
- Italy (1)
- Latvia (1)
- Netherlands (1)
- Poland (3)
- Portugal (2)
- Russia (2)
- Serbia (1)
- Spain (1)
- Sweden (1)
- Turkey (3)
