= Athletics at the 2017 Summer Universiade – Women's long jump =

The women's long jump event at the 2017 Summer Universiade was held on 23 and 24 August at the Taipei Municipal Stadium.

== Medalists ==
Gold	Silver	Bronze
Alina Rotaru; Romania	Nektaria Panayi; Cyprus	Anna Bühler; Germany

== Results ==
=== Qualification ===
Qualification: 6.30 m (Q) or at least 12 best (q) qualified for the final.

Rank	Group	Athlete	Nationality	#1	#2	#3	Result	Notes
1	A	Alina Rotaru	Romania	6.37			6.37	Q
2	A	Māra Grīva	Latvia	6.26	–	–	6.26	q
3	B	Milena Mitkova	Bulgaria	6.06	6.12	6.21	6.21	q
4	A	Rougui Sow	France	5.98	x	6.21	6.21	q
5	B	Matilda Bogdanoff	Finland	x	5.97	6.19	6.19	q
6	A	Lynique Prinsloo	South Africa	6.18	6.01	5.96	6.18	q
7	B	Nektaria Panayi	Cyprus	6.14	–	–	6.14	q
8	B	Tahani Belabiod	Algeria	6.12	5.90	5.56	6.12	q
9	B	Samiyah Samuels	United States	x	6.08	6.01	6.08	q
10	B	Anna Bühler	Germany	6.07	x	5.57	6.07	q
11	A	Mary Zawadi Unyuthfua	Uganda	5.55	5.98	5.98	5.98	q
12	A	Fu Luna	China	5.93	x	5.69	5.93	q, SB
13	B	Sandra Latrace	Canada	5.65	5.88	5.91	5.91	
14	A	Gloria Maldonado	Mexico	5.87	5.68	5.71	5.87	
15	B	Susana Hernández	Mexico	5.71	5.77	5.84	5.84	
16	A	Tähti Alver	Estonia	5.81	5.77	5.80	5.81	
17	B	Samantha Pretorius	South Africa	5.80	5.71	5.73	5.80	
18	B	Alevtina Tarasova	Latvia	5.54	5.79	5.61	5.79	
19	A	Titose Chilume	Botswana	5.49	5.56	5.59	5.59	
20	B	Liou Ya-jyun	Chinese Taipei	5.39	5.47	5.55	5.55	
21	A	Lee Hui-jin	South Korea	5.40	5.52	5.50	5.52	
22	A	Felyn Dolloso	Philippines	5.46	5.48	5.32	5.48	
23	B	Daria Okonnel-Bronin	Estonia	5.13	5.28	5.38	5.38	
24	B	Christel El Saneh	Lebanon	x	5.29	5.24	5.29	
25	A	Justice Henderson	United States	5.13	4.56	5.13	5.13	
26	A	Laventa Amutavi	Kenya	4.85	x	4.74	4.85	
27	B	Jayasingha Arachchilage	Sri Lanka	x	x	4.06	4.06	

=== Final ===
Rank	Name	Nationality	#1	#2	#3	#4	#5	#6	Result	Notes
1st place, gold medalist(s)	Alina Rotaru	Romania	x	x	6.41	6.39	6.65	6.56	6.65	
2nd place, silver medalist(s)	Nektaria Panayi	Cyprus	6.42	x	6.27	6.27	6.36	6.37	6.42	
3rd place, bronze medalist(s)	Anna Bühler	Germany	x	6.20	6.28	6.30	6.37	6.38	6.38	
4	Milena Mitkova	Bulgaria	x	6.19	6.24	6.01	6.26	6.19	6.26	
5	Rougui Sow	France	6.21	x	6.17	x	6.12	x	6.21	
6	Lynique Prinsloo	South Africa	6.21	x	5.94	x	6.07	x	6.21	
7	Samiyah Samuels	United States	6.17	6.13	6.00	6.01	x	5.85	6.17	
8	Māra Grīva	Latvia	6.15	6.16	6.05	6.14	x	6.15	6.16	
9	Tahani Belabiod	Algeria	x	6.10	x				6.10	
10	Matilda Bogdanoff	Finland	x	x	6.04				6.04	
11	Fu Luna	China	x	5.74	5.97				5.97	SB
12	Mary Zawadi Unyuthfua	Uganda	5.73	5.75	x				5.75	
