= 2013 European Athletics U23 Championships – Women's long jump =

The Women's long jump event at the 2013 European Athletics U23 Championships was held in Tampere, Finland, at Ratina Stadium on 13 and 14 July.

== Medalists ==
Gold	Lena Malkus; Germany
Silver	Krystyna Hryshutyna; Ukraine
Bronze	Dafne Schippers; Netherlands

== Results ==
=== Final ===
14 July 2013

Rank	Name	Nationality	Attempts						Result	Notes
Rank	Name	Nationality	1	2	3	4	5	6	Result	Notes
1st place, gold medalist(s)	Lena Malkus	Germany	6.55 (w: +1.2 m/s)	6.45 (w: +2.0 m/s)	6.45 (w: +0.8 m/s)	6.56 (w: +1.2 m/s)	6.47 (w: +0.5 m/s)	6.76 (w: +2.0 m/s)	6.76 (w: +2.0 m/s)	PB
2nd place, silver medalist(s)	Krystyna Hryshutyna	Ukraine	6.54 w (w: +2.5 m/s)	x (w: +2.7 m/s)	5.59 (w: -1.5 m/s)	6.61 (w: +1.6 m/s)	x (w: +0.8 m/s)	6.25 (w: +0.9 m/s)	6.61 (w: +1.6 m/s)	SB
3rd place, bronze medalist(s)	Dafne Schippers	Netherlands	6.58 (w: +1.7 m/s)	x (w: +1.2 m/s)	6.23 (w: +0.3 m/s)	x (w: +1.1 m/s)	6.59 (w: +1.6 m/s)	x (w: +0.2 m/s)	6.59 (w: +1.6 m/s)	PB
4	Polina Yurchenko	Russia	x (w: +1.5 m/s)	x (w: +3.3 m/s)	6.40 (w: +1.4 m/s)	6.49 w (w: +2.8 m/s)	x (w: +0.4 m/s)	6.14 (w: +0.7 m/s)	6.49 w (w: +2.8 m/s)	
5	Alina Rotaru	Romania	x (w: -0.5 m/s)	x (w: +1.6 m/s)	6.31 (w: +0.2 m/s)	6.44 w (w: +3.6 m/s)	6.04 (w: +1.5 m/s)	6.47 (w: +0.7 m/s)	6.47 (w: +0.7 m/s)	
6	Dariya Derkach	Italy	6.45 (w: +1.0 m/s)	x (w: +1.0 m/s)	6.25 (w: +0.2 m/s)	6.05 (w: +0.2 m/s)	x (w: +0.3 m/s)	6.33 (w: -0.4 m/s)	6.45 (w: +1.0 m/s)	
7	Fanni Schmelcz	Hungary	x (w: +1.1 m/s)	6.35 w (w: +2.6 m/s)	5.93 (w: -0.8 m/s)	6.15 w (w: +3.3 m/s)	6.20 w (w: +2.3 m/s)	x (w: +0.4 m/s)	6.35 w (w: +2.6 m/s)	
8	Marina Kraushofer	Austria	x (w: +1.8 m/s)	6.29 (w: +1.9 m/s)	x (w: +1.6 m/s)	x (w: +2.4 m/s)	6.13 (w: +1.0 m/s)	6.05 (w: +1.7 m/s)	6.29 (w: +1.9 m/s)	SB
DQ	Marharyta Tverdohlib	Ukraine	~~6.28~~; ~~(w: +1.0 m/s)~~	~~6.24~~; ~~(w: +0.3 m/s)~~	~~6.17~~; ~~(w: +0.5 m/s)~~				~~6.28~~; ~~(w: +1.0 m/s)~~	
9	Giada Palezza	Italy	5.71 (w: +1.7 m/s)	5.99 (w: +1.7 m/s)	5.88 (w: +0.3 m/s)				5.99 (w: +1.7 m/s)	
10	Shaina Anthony Mags	Portugal	5.80 (w: +1.6 m/s)	x (w: +1.2 m/s)	5.80 (w: -0.4 m/s)				5.80 (w: +1.6 m/s)	
	Lorraine Ugen	United Kingdom							DNS	

=== Qualifications ===
Qualified: qualifying perf. 6.45 (Q) or 12 best performers (q) advance to the Final

==== Summary ====
Rank	Name	Nationality	Result	Notes
1	Dafne Schippers	Netherlands	6.49	Q SB
2	Alina Rotaru	Romania	6.39	q
3	Lena Malkus	Germany	6.34	q
4	Lorraine Ugen	United Kingdom	6.32	q
5	Krystyna Hryshutyna	Ukraine	6.17	q
6	Dariya Derkach	Italy	6.15	q
7	Fanni Schmelcz	Hungary	6.05	q
8	Polina Yurchenko	Russia	6.03	q
9	Giada Palezza	Italy	6.03	q
DQ	Marharyta Tverdohlib	Ukraine	~~6.02~~	q
10	Shaina Anthony Mags	Portugal	5.99	q
11	Marina Kraushofer	Austria	5.97	q
12	Emmi Mäkinen	Finland	5.88	
13	Maiko Gogoladze	Georgia	5.81	
14	Georgiana Michnea	Romania	5.70	
15	Anna Visibelli	Italy	5.67	
16	Pınar Aday	Turkey	5.61	

==== Details ====
===== Group A =====
13 July 2013 / 10:25

Rank	Name	Nationality	Attempts			Result	Notes
Rank	Name	Nationality	1	2	3	Result	Notes
1	Alina Rotaru	Romania	6.32 (w: -0.3 m/s)	x (w: +0.4 m/s)	6.39 (w: -0.1 m/s)	6.39 (w: -0.1 m/s)	q
2	Dariya Derkach	Italy	6.15 (w: -0.6 m/s)	6.11 (w: -0.4 m/s)	-	6.15 (w: -0.6 m/s)	q
3	Fanni Schmelcz	Hungary	x (w: +0.4 m/s)	6.05 (w: +0.5 m/s)	6.02 (w: +0.4 m/s)	6.05 (w: +0.5 m/s)	q
4	Polina Yurchenko	Russia	5.85 (w: -0.1 m/s)	6.00 (w: -0.4 m/s)	6.03 (w: -0.7 m/s)	6.03 (w: -0.7 m/s)	q
DQ	Marharyta Tverdohlib	Ukraine	~~5.94~~; ~~(w: 0.0 m/s)~~	~~5.73~~; ~~(w: 0.0 m/s)~~	~~6.02~~; ~~(w: -0.2 m/s)~~	~~6.02~~; ~~(w: -0.2 m/s)~~	q
5	Emmi Mäkinen	Finland	5.70 (w: -0.6 m/s)	5.88 (w: -0.1 m/s)	5.86 (w: +0.6 m/s)	5.88 (w: -0.1 m/s)	
6	Maiko Gogoladze	Georgia	5.59 (w: -0.5 m/s)	5.81 (w: -0.9 m/s)	5.75 (w: -1.2 m/s)	5.81 (w: -0.9 m/s)	
7	Anna Visibelli	Italy	5.67 (w: +0.1 m/s)	x (w: +0.2 m/s)	5.52 (w: -0.7 m/s)	5.67 (w: +0.1 m/s)	

===== Group B =====
13 July 2013 / 10:25

Rank	Name	Nationality	Attempts			Result	Notes
Rank	Name	Nationality	1	2	3	Result	Notes
1	Dafne Schippers	Netherlands	6.49 (w: 0.0 m/s)			6.49 (w: 0.0 m/s)	Q SB
2	Lena Malkus	Germany	6.29 (w: 0.0 m/s)	6.34 (w: 0.0 m/s)	6.02 (w: 0.0 m/s)	6.34 (w: 0.0 m/s)	q
3	Lorraine Ugen	United Kingdom	x (w: 0.0 m/s)	6.32 (w: 0.0 m/s)	6.05 (w: 0.0 m/s)	6.32 (w: 0.0 m/s)	q
4	Krystyna Hryshutyna	Ukraine	6.17 (w: 0.0 m/s)	6.12 (w: 0.0 m/s)	x (w: 0.0 m/s)	6.17 (w: 0.0 m/s)	q
5	Giada Palezza	Italy	5.90 (w: 0.0 m/s)	6.03 (w: 0.0 m/s)	5.82 (w: 0.0 m/s)	6.03 (w: 0.0 m/s)	q
6	Shaina Anthony Mags	Portugal	5.77 (w: 0.0 m/s)	5.83 (w: 0.0 m/s)	5.99 (w: 0.0 m/s)	5.99 (w: 0.0 m/s)	q
7	Marina Kraushofer	Austria	x (w: 0.0 m/s)	5.97 (w: 0.0 m/s)	5.75 (w: 0.0 m/s)	5.97 (w: 0.0 m/s)	q
8	Georgiana Michnea	Romania	x (w: 0.0 m/s)	5.40 (w: 0.0 m/s)	5.70 (w: 0.0 m/s)	5.70 (w: 0.0 m/s)	
9	Pınar Aday	Turkey	4.24 (w: 0.0 m/s)	5.61 (w: 0.0 m/s)	x (w: 0.0 m/s)	5.61 (w: 0.0 m/s)	

== Participation ==
According to an unofficial count, 17 athletes from 13 countries participated in the event.

- Austria (1)
- Finland (1)
- Georgia (1)
- Germany (1)
- Hungary (1)
- Italy (3)
- Netherlands (1)
- Portugal (1)
- Romania (2)
- Russia (1)
- Turkey (1)
- Ukraine (2)
- United Kingdom (1)
