= 2005 European Athletics U23 Championships – Men's 5000 metres =

The men's 5000 metres event at the 2005 European Athletics U23 Championships was held in Erfurt, Germany, at Steigerwaldstadion on 17 July.

== Medalists ==
Gold	Anatoliy Rybakov; Russia
Silver	Mo Farah; United Kingdom
Bronze	Aleksey Aleksandrov; Russia

== Results ==
=== Final ===
17 July

Rank	Name	Nationality	Time	Notes
1st place, gold medalist(s)	Anatoliy Rybakov	Russia	14:06.69	
2nd place, silver medalist(s)	Mo Farah	United Kingdom	14:10.96	
3rd place, bronze medalist(s)	Aleksey Aleksandrov	Russia	14:11.10	
4	Marius Ionescu	Romania	14:15.42	
5	Martin Fagan	Ireland	14:16.28	
6	Scott Overall	United Kingdom	14:17.16	
7	Noel Cutillas	Spain	14:19.26	
8	Rafał Snochowski	Poland	14:20.89	
9	Stefano Scaini	Italy	14:25.36	
10	Kristof Van Malderen	Belgium	14:27.42	
11	Marcin Janiak	Poland	14:30.87	
12	Stefano Cugusi	Italy	14:32.00	
13	Karol Rzeszewicz	Poland	14:33.92	
14	Thibaud Naël	France	14:37.43	
15	Stéphane Lefrand	France	14:38.88	
16	Tom Humphries	United Kingdom	14:50.66	
17	Joseph Sweeney	Ireland	14:59.48	
18	Yohan Durand	France	14:59.86	
	Mario Van Waeyenberge	Belgium	DNF	
	Francisco José Bachiller	Spain	DNF	
	Velibor Radojević	Serbia and Montenegro	DNF	

== Participation ==
According to an unofficial count, 21 athletes from 10 countries participated in the event.

- Belgium (2)
- France (3)
- Ireland (2)
- Italy (2)
- Poland (3)
- Romania (1)
- Russia (2)
- Serbia and Montenegro (1)
- Spain (2)
- United Kingdom (3)
