= 2019 World Athletics Championships – Women's long jump =

Women's long jump at the 2019 World Championships
- Venue: Khalifa International Stadium
- Dates: 5 October (qualification); 6 October (final)
- Competitors: 31 from 20 nations
- Winning distance: 7.30 m (23 ft 11 1/4 in)

Medalists
| gold medal | Malaika Mihambo | Germany |
| silver medal | Maryna Bekh-Romanchuk | Ukraine |
| bronze medal | Ese Brume | Nigeria |

Video on YouTube Official Video

The women's long jump at the 2019 World Athletics Championships was held at the Khalifa International Stadium in Doha, Qatar, from 5 to 6 October 2019.

The winning margin was 38 cm. As of 2024, this is the only time the women's long jump has been won by more than 30 cm at these championships.

== Summary ==
Throughout the 2019 season, only 3 athletes were able to jump over 7 metres, led by Malaika Mihambo who had been there in 6 out of 10 competitions. One of the others was defending champion Brittney Reese, who didn't make it out of the qualifying round, leaving Ese Brume as Mihambo's strongest challenger.

On the first jump of the competition, Brume jumped 6.83m, then third up Maryna Bekh-Romanchuk came close to Brume with a 6.81m. At the end of the round, Abigail Irozuru jumped 6.64m to take over third place. Brume opened the second round by expanding her lead with a 6.91m. After two rounds Mihambo was languishing in seventh place with a 6.52m, which would ultimately prove to be inadequate to qualify for the final three jumps. On her third jump she went 7.30 m (23 ft 11 1/4 in). It was her personal best and more than 20 cm beyond the personal best of everyone else in the field. Later in the competition, she had two more jumps that would have won the competition, the last equalling her previous world leading jump 7.16m. Those standings remained until near the end of the fifth round when Bekh-Romanchuk jumped 6.92m to take silver by a centimetre.

== Records ==
Before the competition records were as follows:

| Record | Perf. | Athlete | Nat. | Date | Location |
|---|---|---|---|---|---|
| World | 7.52 | Galina Chistyakova | URS | 11 Jun 1988 | Leningrad, Soviet Union |
| Championship | 7.36 | Jackie Joyner-Kersee | USA | 4 Sep 1987 | Rome, Italy |
| World leading | 7.30 | Malaika Mihambo | GER | 4 Aug 2019 | Berlin, Germany |
| African | 7.12 | Chioma Ajunwa | NGR | 2 Aug 1996 | Atlanta, United States |
| Asian | 7.01 | Yao Weili | CHN | 5 Jun 1993 | Jinan, China |
| NACAC | 7.49 | Jackie Joyner-Kersee | USA | 22 May 1994 | New York City, United States |
| NACAC | 7.49 | Jackie Joyner-Kersee | USA | 31 Jul 1994 | Sestriere, Italy |
| South American | 7.26 | Maurren Higa Maggi | BRA | 26 Jun 1999 | Bogotá, Colombia |
| European | 7.52 | Galina Chistyakova | URS | 11 Jun 1988 | Leningrad, Soviet Union |
| Oceanian | 7.05 | Brooke Stratton | AUS | 12 Mar 2016 | Perth, Australia |

== Schedule ==
The event schedule, in local time (UTC+3), was as follows:

| Date | Time | Round |
|---|---|---|
| 5 October | 17:50 | Qualification |
| 6 October | 19:15 | Final |

== Results ==
=== Qualification ===
Qualification: Qualifying Performance 6.75 (Q) or at least 12 best performers (q) advanced to the final.

| Rank | Group | Name | Nationality | Round | | | Mark | Notes |
| Rank | Group | Name | Nationality | 1 | 2 | 3 | Mark | Notes |
|---|---|---|---|---|---|---|---|---|
| 1 | B | Malaika Mihambo | Germany | 6.98 | | | 6.98 | Q |
| 2 | A | Ese Brume | Nigeria | 6.89 | | | 6.89 | Q |
| 3 | A | Tori Bowie | United States | 6.54 | 6.77 | | 6.77 | Q |
| 4 | B | Maryna Bekh-Romanchuk | Ukraine | 6.69 | 6.74 | – | 6.74 | q |
| 5 | A | Alina Rotaru | Romania | 6.57 | 6.31 | 6.72 | 6.72 | q |
| 6 | B | Abigail Irozuru | Great Britain & N.I. | 6.66 | 6.70 | – | 6.70 | q |
| 7 | B | Nastassia Mironchyk-Ivanova | Belarus | 6.41 | 6.69 | – | 6.69 | q |
| 8 | A | Shara Proctor | Great Britain & N.I. | 6.54 | 6.63 | – | 6.63 | q |
| 9 | A | Brooke Stratton | Australia | 6.43 | 6.58 | 6.43 | 6.58 | q |
| 10 | A | Chanice Porter | Jamaica | 6.50 | 6.46 | 6.57 | 6.57 | q |
| 11 | A | Anasztázia Nguyen | Hungary | 6.41 | x | 6.54 | 6.54 | q |
| 12 | B | Sha'Keela Saunders | United States | 6.35 | 6.27 | 6.53 | 6.53 | q |
| 13 | A | Brittney Reese | United States | 6.44 | 6.43 | 6.52 | 6.52 | |
| 14 | B | Jasmine Todd | United States | 6.51 | 6.50 | 6.07 | 6.51 | |
| 15 | A | Eliane Martins | Brazil | x | 6.25 | 6.50 | 6.50 | |
| 16 | B | Tissanna Hickling | Jamaica | 6.35 | 6.49 | 6.22 | 6.49 | |
| 17 | B | Tilde Johansson | Sweden | 6.34 | 6.48 | 6.48 | 6.48 | |
| 18 | B | Hilary Kpatcha | France | 6.38 | x | 6.47 | 6.47 | |
| 19 | B | Jazmin Sawyers | Great Britain & N.I. | 6.45 | 6.46 | 6.45 | 6.46 | |
| 20 | A | Yanis David | France | 6.44 | 6.46 | x | 6.46 | |
| 21 | A | Éloyse Lesueur-Aymonin | France | 6.34 | 6.46 | 6.39 | 6.46 | |
| 22 | A | Chantel Malone | British Virgin Islands | x | 6.21 | 6.45 | 6.45 | |
| 23 | B | Petra Farkas | Hungary | 6.08 | 6.44 | 6.20 | 6.44 | |
| 24 | B | Yelena Sokolova | Authorised Neutral Athletes | 6.21 | 6.43 | 6.39 | 6.43 | |
| 25 | A | Adriana Rodríguez | Cuba | 6.39 | x | 6.29 | 6.39 | |
| 26 | B | Maria Natalia Londa | Indonesia | 6.31 | 6.16 | 6.36 | 6.36 | |
| 27 | A | Taika Koilahti | Finland | 6.33 | 6.02 | 6.35 | 6.35 | |
| 28 | B | Tania Vicenzino | Italy | 6.19 | x | 6.23 | 6.23 | |
| 29 | B | Florentina Iusco | Romania | 6.22 | 6.21 | x | 6.22 | |
| 30 | A | Nektaria Panagi | Cyprus | 6.10 | 6.21 | 6.19 | 6.21 | |
| 31 | A | Laura Strati | Italy | x | x | 6.05 | 6.05 | |

=== Final ===
The final was started on 6 October at 19:16.

| Rank | Name | Nationality | Round | | | | | | Mark | Notes |
| Rank | Name | Nationality | 1 | 2 | 3 | 4 | 5 | 6 | Mark | Notes |
|---|---|---|---|---|---|---|---|---|---|---|
| 1st place, gold medalist(s) | Malaika Mihambo | Germany | 6.52 | x | 7.30 | – | 7.09 | 7.16 | 7.30 | WL |
| 2nd place, silver medalist(s) | Maryna Bekh-Romanchuk | Ukraine | 6.81 | x | 6.77 | x | 6.92 | 6.72 | 6.92 | SB |
| 3rd place, bronze medalist(s) | Ese Brume | Nigeria | 6.83 | 6.91 | 6.90 | 6.87 | 6.84 | 6.45 | 6.91 | |
| 4 | Tori Bowie | United States | 6.61 | 6.49 | x | 6.81 | 6.65 | 6.57 | 6.81 | SB |
| 5 | Nastassia Mironchyk-Ivanova | Belarus | 6.53 | x | 6.76 | 6.70 | 6.55 | 6.71 | 6.76 | |
| 6 | Alina Rotaru | Romania | 6.59 | 6.66 | 6.67 | x | 6.71 | x | 6.71 | |
| 7 | Abigail Irozuru | Great Britain & N.I. | 6.64 | x | 6.59 | 6.59 | 6.60 | x | 6.64 | |
| 8 | Chanice Porter | Jamaica | 6.30 | 6.44 | 6.56 | 6.44 | 6.24 | 6.47 | 6.56 | |
| 9 | Sha'Keela Saunders | United States | x | 6.28 | 6.54 | | | | 6.54 | |
| 10 | Brooke Stratton | Australia | 6.46 | x | 6.42 | | | | 6.46 | |
| 11 | Shara Proctor | Great Britain & N.I. | x | 6.34 | 6.43 | | | | 6.43 | |
| 12 | Anasztázia Nguyen | Hungary | x | 6.26 | x | | | | 6.26 | |
