= Lena Malkus =

German long jumper

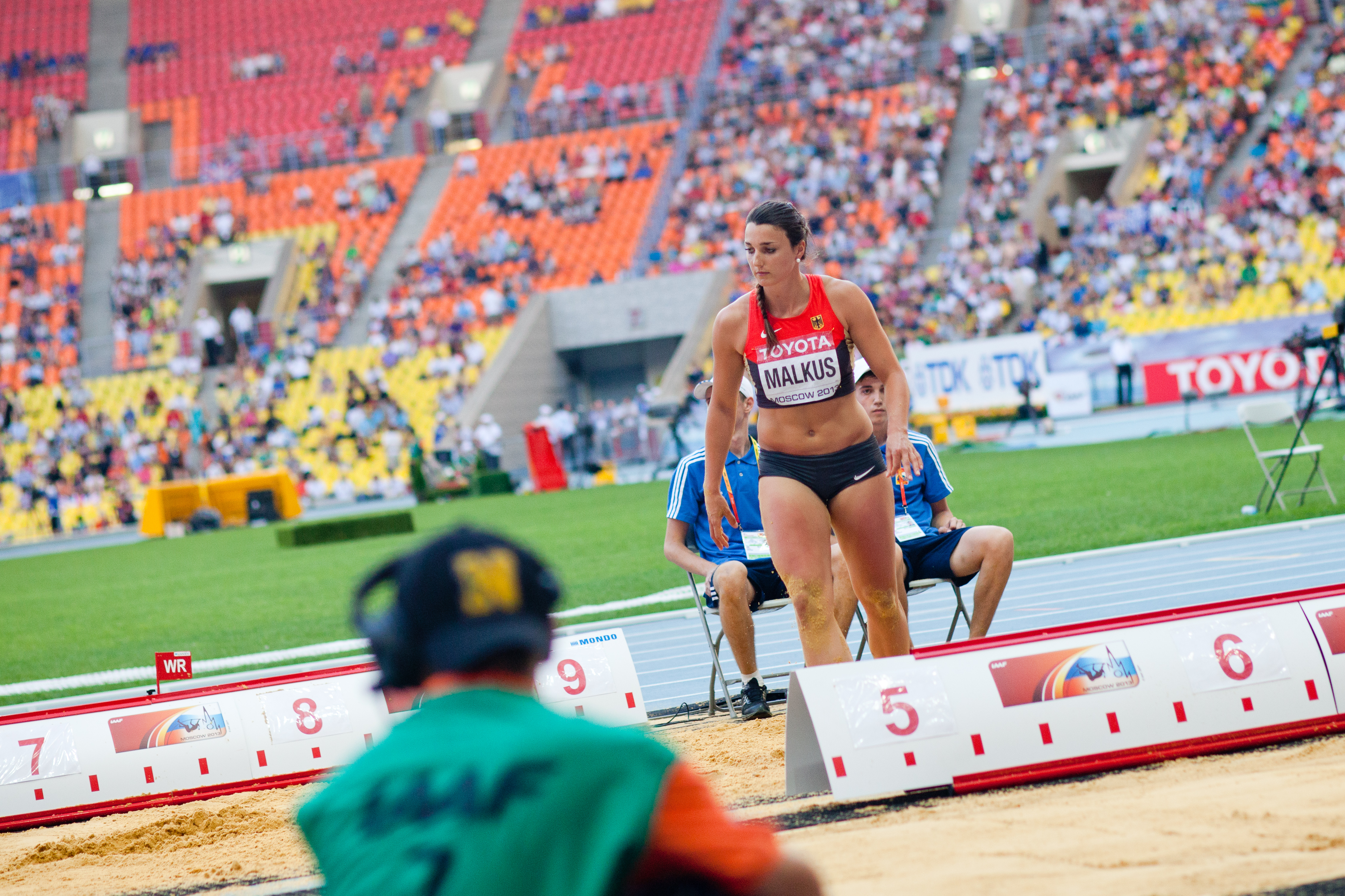
Lena Malkus, 2013 World Championships.

Lena Malkus (born 6 August 1993 in Bremen) is a German long jumper.

She won the 2010 Summer Youth Olympics, the 2011 European Junior Championships and the 2013 European U23 Championships and won the silver medal at the 2012 World Junior Championships. She also competed at the 2013 and 2015 World Championships without reaching the final.

Her personal best jump is 6.88 metres, achieved in May 2014 in Weinheim.

== Competition record ==
Year	Competition	Venue	Position	Event	Notes
Representing Germany
2009	European Youth Olympic Festival	Tampere, Finland	1st	Long jump	6.33 m
2010	Youth Olympic Games	Singapore	1st	Long jump	6.40 m
2011	European Junior Championships	Tallinn, Estonia	1st	Long jump	6.40 m
2012	World Junior Championships	Barcelona, Spain	2nd	Long jump	6.80 m
2013	European U23 Championships	Tampere, Finland	1st	Long jump	6.76 m
2013	World Championships	Moscow, Russia	17th (q)	Long jump	6.49 m
2015	European U23 Championships	Tallinn, Estonia	5th	Long jump	6.64 m
2015	World Championships	Beijing, China	22nd (q)	Long jump	6.46 m
