= 2016 IAAF World Indoor Championships – Women's long jump =

Women's long jump at the 2016 IAAF World Indoor Championships
- Venue: Oregon Convention Center
- Dates: March 18
- Competitors: 16 from 11 nations
- Winning distance: 7.22

Medalists
gold medal	Brittney Reese	United States
silver medal	Ivana Španović	Serbia
bronze medal	Lorraine Ugen	Great Britain

The women's long jump at the 2016 IAAF World Indoor Championships took place on March 18, 2016.

On paper, Brittney Reese came into this meet with a 20 cm better personal best. But the personal best came before a 2014 injury. Her 2015 season was still hampered by recovery. Ivana Španović wasn't reading the paper and took the first round lead with a new indoor personal best 7.00, just short of her outdoor personal best of 7.02. Reese jumped 6.97 to assume second place but couldn't match that until her fifth round jump when she equalled it exactly. For a little over a minute, Reese held the lead based on the tie breaking second best jump. Španović broke that up by jumping a new personal best and National Record of 7.07. With her one remaining jump, Reese pulled out the big gun, letting out a scream as she boomed her 7.22 m (23 ft 8 1/4 in) winner, just 1 cm below her indoor personal best, set to win this championship 4 years earlier, also on her last jump.

Behind the battle for gold, Lorraine Ugen was in third place after the first round with a 6.62. Janay DeLoach Soukup moved into bronze medal position with her second round 6.80 which also held up until the fifth round fireworks where Ugen flew out to a 6.93 National Record. DeLoach improved on her next two jumps, but her best of 6.89 couldn't quite make up the gap.

== Results ==
The final was started at 18.55.

Rank	Athlete	Nationality	#1	#2	#3	#4	#5	#6	Result	Notes
1st place, gold medalist(s)	Brittney Reese	United States	6.97	x	x	6.88	7.00	7.22	7.22	WL
2nd place, silver medalist(s)	Ivana Španović	Serbia	7.00	6.88	x	x	7.07	6.76	7.07	NR
3rd place, bronze medalist(s)	Lorraine Ugen	Great Britain	6.62	6.64	6.65	x	6.93	6.86	6.93	NR
4	Janay DeLoach Soukup	United States	x	6.80	x	x	6.85	6.89	6.89	SB
5	Brooke Stratton	Australia	6.57	6.75	6.62	x	6.72		6.75	
6	Alexandra Wester	Germany	x	6.44	6.67	6.59	6.57		6.67	
7	Ksenija Balta	Estonia	6.59	6.57	6.48	6.60	6.59		6.60	
8	Shara Proctor	Great Britain	x	6.55	6.57	x	6.54		6.57	
9	Nastassia Mironchyk-Ivanova	Belarus	6.56	6.55	6.47				6.56	
10	Alina Rotaru	Romania	x	6.40	6.45				6.45	
11	Chelsea Jaensch	Australia	5.84	6.28	6.38				6.38	
12	Xenia Stolz	Germany	6.34	x	6.37				6.37	
13	Jazmin Sawyers	Great Britain	x	6.31	6.27				6.31	
14	Khaddi Sagnia	Sweden	6.08	5.98	–				6.08	
	Konomi Kai	Japan	x	x	x				NM	
	Eliane Martins	Brazil	x	x	x				NM	
