= Romanian Athletics Federation =

Sports governing body in Romania

- Federaţia Română de Atletism
- Sport: Athletics
- Abbreviation: FRA
- Founded: 1912
- Affiliation: World Athletics
- Headquarters: Bucharest, Romania
- President: Constantina Diță

Official website
- www.fra.ro
- (Romania)

The Romanian Athletics Federation (Romanian: Federația Română de Atletism) is the Romanian national sporting authority which coordinates athletics activity.

== History ==
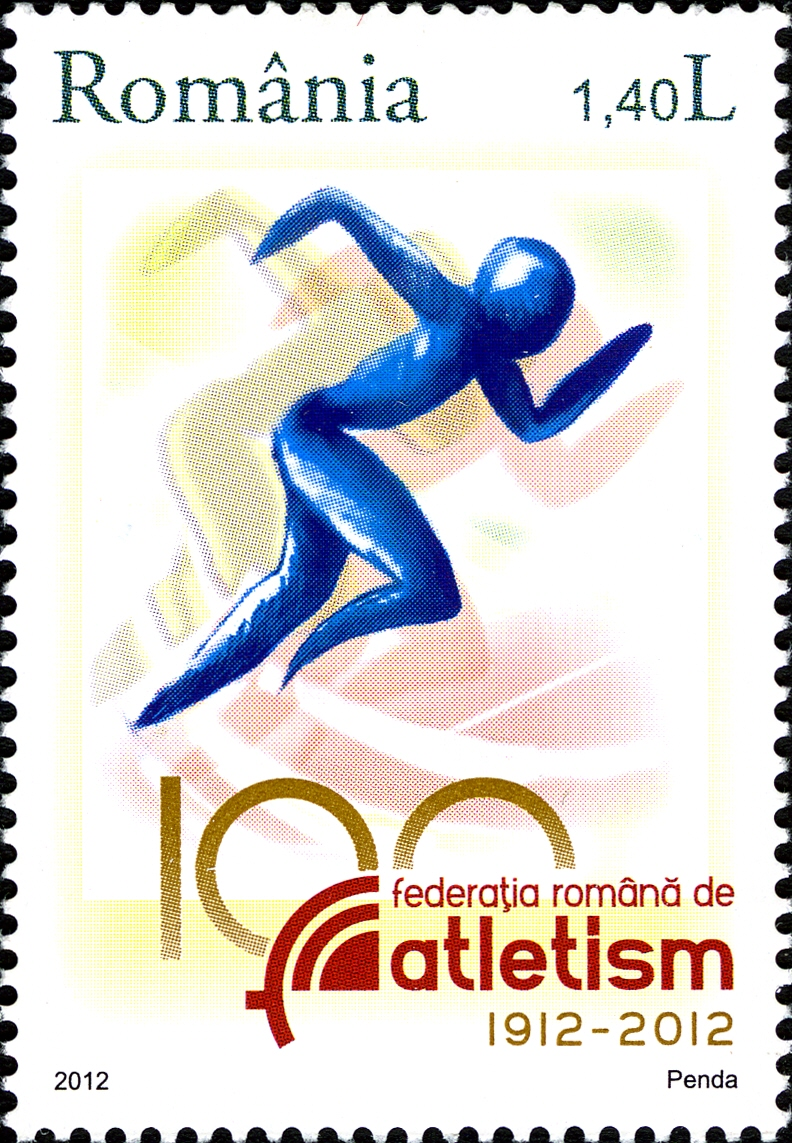
Stamp of Romania, 2012

Athletics first appeared in Romania at the end of the 19th century. The first organized athletics competition took place in 1882 in Bucharest.

In 1912, the Commission for athletics, track and field and other contests (Romanian: Comisia de atletism, alergări pe jos și concursuri was formed. It was part of the Romanian Federation of Sporting Societies (Federația Română a Societăților Spotive). This commission was precursor to the Romanian Athletics Federation. The first Romanian national championships were held in 1914. They were 16 probes and were only for men. In 1915, the first athletics field was inaugurated in Bucharest. In 1922, competitions for women were introduced and three years later the first national championships for women were introduced, along with the national championships for junior athletes. In 1923 the RAF joined the IAAF.

At the 1928 Olympic Games in Amsterdam, Romania participated for the first time at the athletics competition, with 10 male athletes and 2 female athletes. In 1937, the RFA organized the Balkan Games for the first time in Romania and in 1948 the Romanian International Championships commenced.

== Honours ==
- (Romania) Romanian Royal Family: 75th Member of the Royal Decoration of the Cross of the Romanian Royal House
