= Paula Todoran =

Romanian long-distance runner

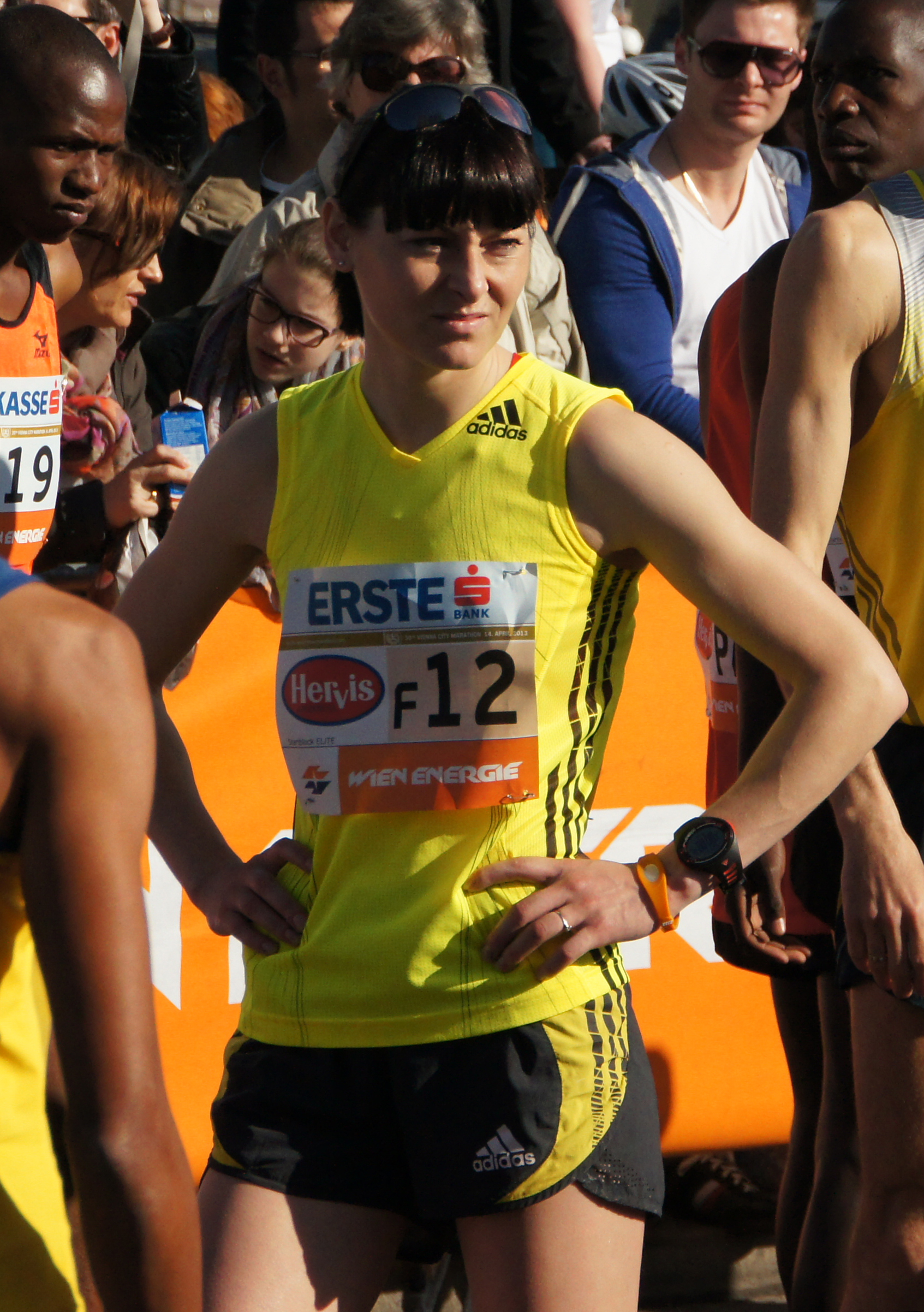
Todoran, preparing for VCM in 2013.

Paula Todoran (born 9 June 1985 in Zalău) is a Romanian long-distance runner.

== Career highlights ==
European Championships
2007 - 4th, 10,000 m (under-23)

== Personal bests ==
Distance	Mark	Date	Location
5,000 m	15:52.99	10 June 2007	Bucharest
10,000 m	33:12.08	13 July 2007	Debrecen
20,000 m	1:08.32	2 September 2007	Zalău
Half marathon	1:12.59	14 October 2007	Udine
Marathon	2:47.23	5 October 2014	Bucharest
