= Daniela Stanciu =

Romanian high jumper

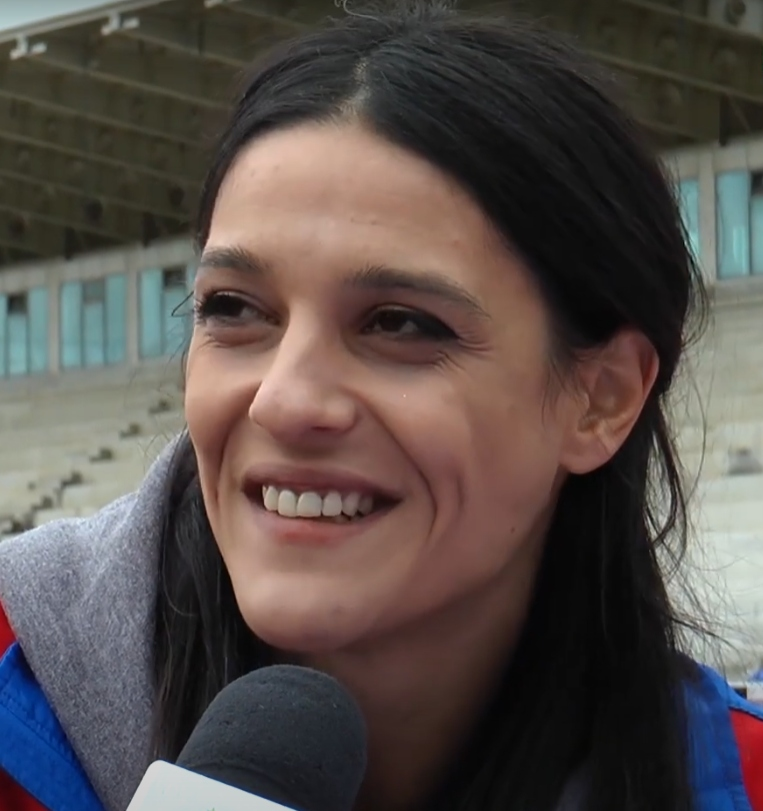
- STEAUA TV 2020

Personal information
- Nationality: Romanian
- Born: 15 October 1987 (age 38) Buftea, Romania

Sport
- Country: Romania
- Sport: Track and field
- Event: High jump
Medal record
Women's athletics
Representing Romania
European Games
Bronze medal – third place	2023 Kraków-Małopolska	High jump

Daniela Stanciu (born 15 October 1987) is a Romanian athlete who specialises in the high jump. She has represented Romania at the 2016 Summer Olympics and the 2020 Summer Olympics.

== Personal bests ==
=== Outdoor ===
Event	Record	Venue	Date
High jump	1.96	Pitești	31 July 2019

=== Indoor ===
Event	Record	Venue	Date
High jump	1.94	Bucharest	14 February 2015 / 6 February 2019

== Competition record ==
Year	Competition	Venue	Position	Notes
Representing Romania
2014	European Championships	Zurich, Switzerland	8th	1.94 m|PB
2020	Balkan Championships	Cluj-Napoca, Romania	1st	1.88 m
2021	European Indoor Championships	Toruń, Poland	5th	1.92 m|SB
2021	Olympic Games	Tokyo, Japan	19th (q)	1.90 m
2022	World Championships	Eugene, United States	10th	1.93 m
2022	European Championships	Munich, Germany	14th (q)	1.83 m
2023	European Indoor Championships	Istanbul, Turkey	7th	1.86 m
2023	World Championships	Budapest, Hungary	20th (q)	1.85 m
2024	World Indoor Championships	Glasgow, United Kingdom	–	NM
2024	Olympic Games	Paris, France	19th (q)	1.88 m
