= Ana Rodean =

Romanian racewalker

Personal information
- Full name: Ana Veronica Rodean
- Born: 23 June 1984 (age 41) Alba Iulia, Romania
- Height: 170 cm (5 ft 7 in)
- Weight: 55 kg (121 lb)

Sport
- Sport: Track and field
- Event: 20 kilometres race walk

Ana Veronica Rodean (born 23 June 1984) is a Romanian race walker. She competed in the women's 20 kilometres walk event at the 2016 Summer Olympics. In 2018, she competed in the women's 20 kilometres walk event at the 2018 European Athletics Championships held in Berlin, Germany. She finished in 19th place.
