= Marius Ionescu =

Romanian long-distance runner

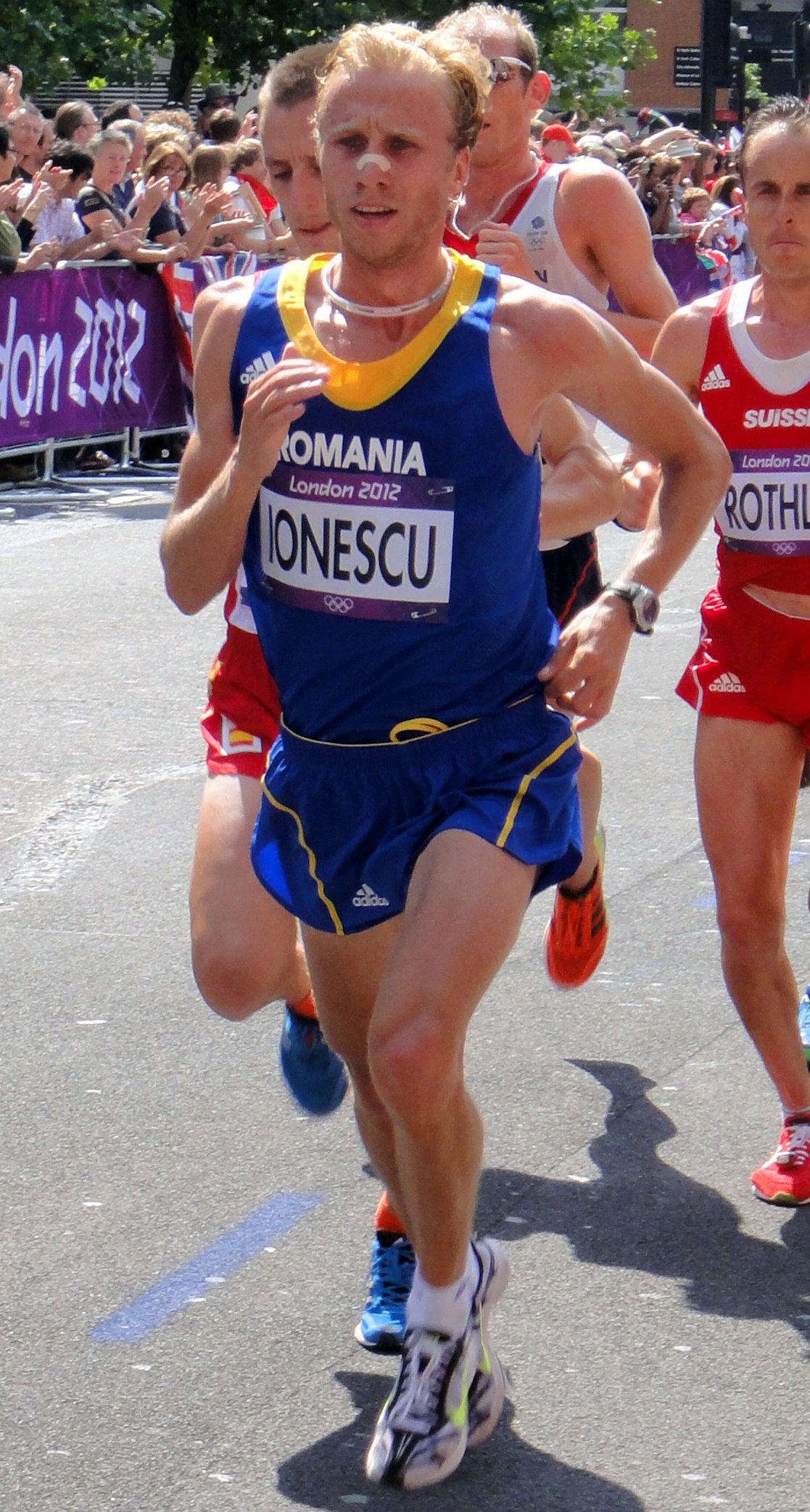
- Ionescu in the marathon at the 2012 Olympics in London

Personal information
- Born: 18 December 1984 (age 41) Craiova, Romania
- Height: 1.71 m (5 ft 7 1/2 in)
- Weight: 55 kg (121 lb)
- Website: mariusionescu.ro

Sport
- Country: Romania
- Sport: Athletics
- Event: Marathon
- Team: NN Running Team

Marius Viorel Ionescu (born 18 December 1984) is a Romanian long-distance runner.

== Biography ==
At the 2012 Summer Olympics, he competed in the Men's marathon, finishing in 26th place.

== Achievements ==
Year	Competition	Venue	Position	Event	Notes
Representing Romania
2003	European Junior Championships	Tampere, Finland	2nd	5000 m	14:16.12
2003	European Junior Championships	Tampere, Finland	1st	10,000 m	29:40.41
2003	European Cross Country Championships	Edinburgh, United Kingdom	5th	Junior race (6.595 km)	21:04
2003	European Cross Country Championships	Edinburgh, United Kingdom	2nd	Junior race - Team	31 pts
2005	European U23 Championships	Erfurt, Germany	4th	5000m	14:15.42
2005	European U23 Championships	Erfurt, Germany	3rd	10,000m	29:34.52
2005	Universiade	İzmir, Turkey	18th	10,000 m	31:08.11
2005	Jeux de la Francophonie	Niamey, Niger	7th	5000 m	14:28.75
2007	European Indoor Championships	Birmingham, United Kingdom	16th (h)	3000 m	8:06.02
2007	Universiade	Bangkok, Thailand	16th	5000 m	14:40.19
2010	European Championships	Barcelona, Spain	21st	10,000 m	30:21.76
2011	World Championships	Daegu, South Korea	13th	Marathon	2:15:32
2012	Olympic Games	London, United Kingdom	26th	Marathon	2:16:28
2013	World Championships	Moscow, Russia	26th	Marathon	2:18:31
2014	European Championships	Zurich, Switzerland	—	Marathon	DNF
2015	Düsseldorf Marathon	Düsseldorf, Germany	1st	Marathon	2:13:19
2015	World Championships	Beijing, China	—	Marathon	DNF
2016	Düsseldorf Marathon	Düsseldorf, Germany	2nd	Marathon	2:12:58
2016	European Championships	Amsterdam, Netherlands	25th	Half marathon	1:05:21
2016	Olympic Games	Rio de Janeiro, Brazil	37th	Marathon	2:17:27
