= Alina Rotaru-Kottmann =

Romanian long jumper (born 1993)

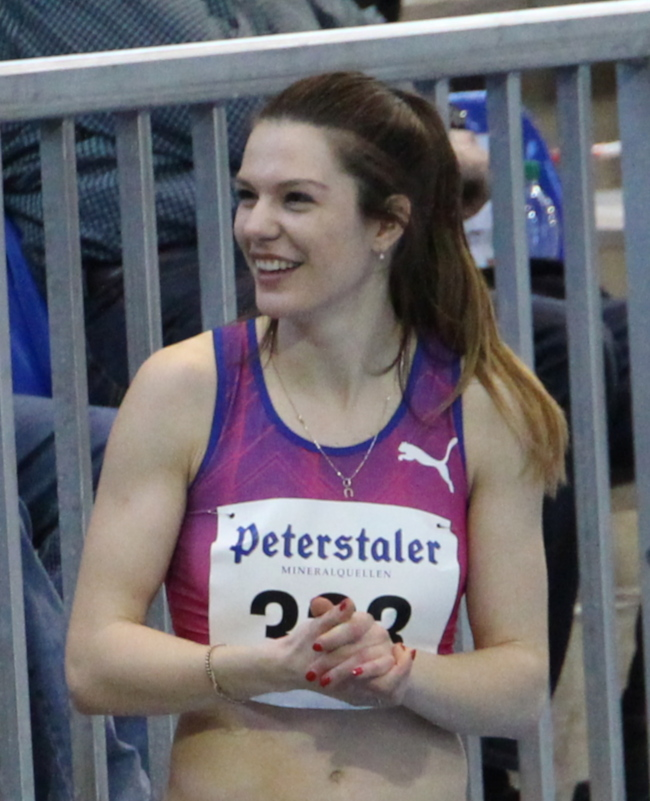
- Alina Rotaru in 2015

Personal information
- Nationality: Romanian
- Born: Alina Rotaru; 5 June 1993 (age 33) Bucharest, Romania
- Education: Ovidius University
- Height: 1.75 m (5 ft 9 in)
- Weight: 57 kg (126 lb)

Sport
- Country: Romania
- Sport: Athletics
- Event: Long jump

Achievements and titles
- Olympic finals: 2016: 18th (q); 2020: 17th (q)
- Personal best: 6.96 m
Medal record
Women's athletics
Representing Romania
World Championships
Bronze medal – third place	2023 Budapest	Long jump
Summer Universiade
Gold medal – first place	2017 Taipei	Long jump

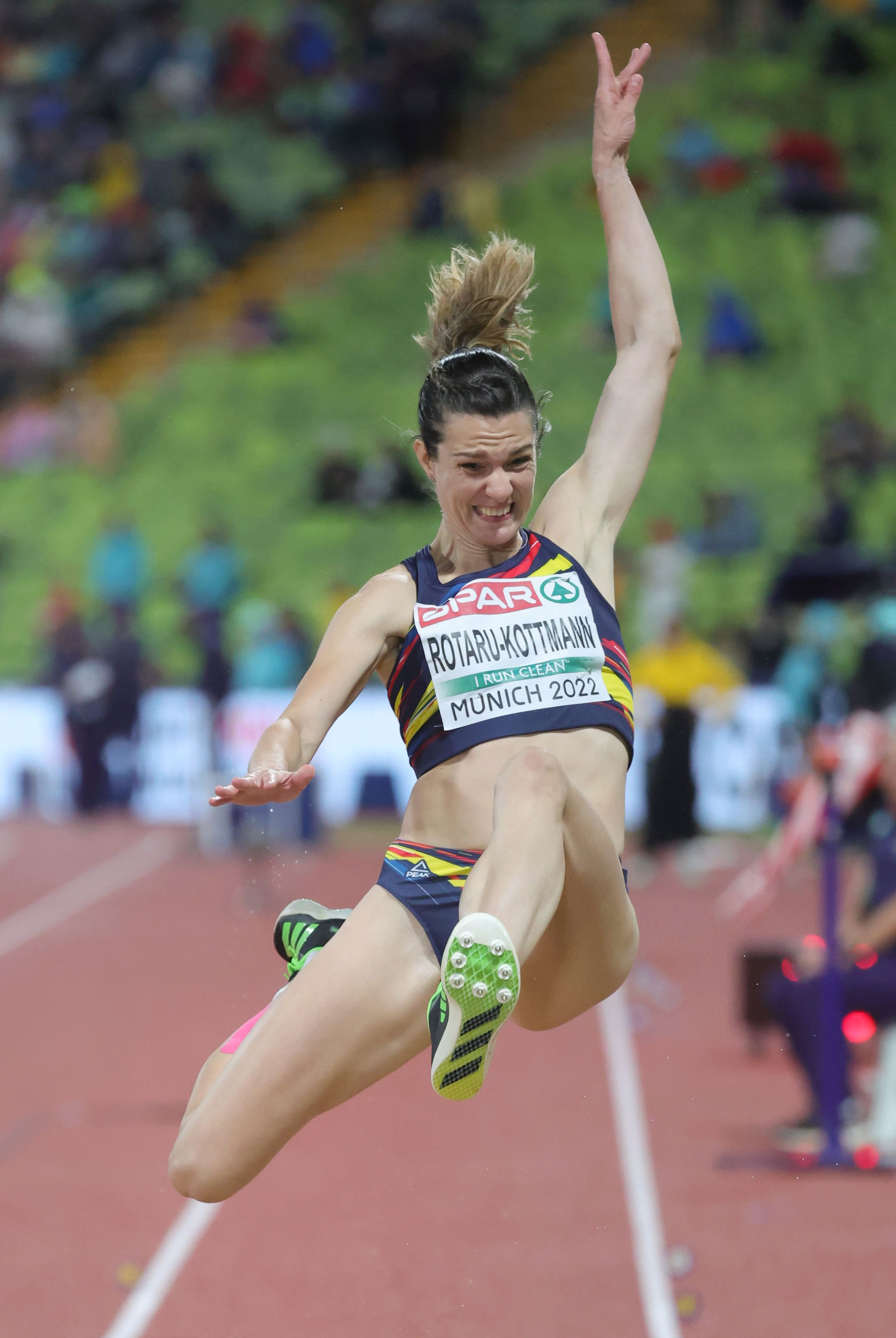
Rotaru-Kottmann, 2022

Alina Rotaru-Kottmann, née Alina Rotaru, (born 5 June 1993) is a Romanian long jumper. She won the bronze medal at the 2023 World Championships in the long jump event.

At the 2009 World Youth Championships she won the silver medal in long jump and finished fourth in the high jump. She was knocked out in the qualification at the 2010 World Junior Championships, but won the silver medal at the 2010 Summer Youth Olympics.

She finished fifth at the 2012 World Junior Championships, fourth at the 2013 Jeux de la Francophonie and seventh at the 2014 European Championships. She also competed at the 2012 European Championships and the 2013 European Indoor Championships without reaching the final.

Her personal best jump is 6.96 metres, achieved in Inneringen in July 2023.

== International competitions ==
Year	Competition	Venue	Position	Event	Notes
Representing Romania
2009	World Junior Championships	Brixen, Italy	4th	High jump	1.82 m
2009	World Junior Championships	Brixen, Italy	2nd	Long jump	6.09 m
2009	European Youth Olympic Festival	Tampere, Finland	5th	High jump	1.79 m
2009	European Youth Olympic Festival	Tampere, Finland	2nd	Long jump	6.24 m
2010	World Junior Championships	Moncton, Canada	19th (q)	Long jump	5.27 m
2010	Youth Olympic Games	Singapore	2nd	Long jump	6.38 m
2011	European Junior Championships	Tallinn, Estonia	2nd	Long jump	6.36 m
2012	European Championships	Helsinki, Finland	20th (q)	Long jump	6.19 m
2012	World Junior Championships	Barcelona, Spain	5th	Long jump	6.52 m
2013	European Indoor Championships	Gothenburg, Sweden	11th (q)	Long jump	6.39 m
2013	European U23 Championships	Tampere, Finland	5th	Long jump	6.47 m
2013	Jeux de la Francophonie	Nice, France	4th	Long jump	6.57 m (w)
2014	European Championships	Zürich, Switzerland	7th	Long jump	6.55 m
2015	European Indoor Championships	Prague, Czech Republic	4th	Long jump	6.74 m
2015	European U23 Championships	Tallinn, Estonia	3rd	Long jump	6.69 m
2015	World Championships	Beijing, China	15th (q)	Long jump	6.58 m
2015	Military World Games	Mungyeong, South Korea	3rd	High jump	1.80 m
2015	Military World Games	Mungyeong, South Korea	3rd	Long jump	6.33 m
2016	World Indoor Championships	Portland, United States	10th	Long jump	6.45 m
2016	Olympic Games	Rio de Janeiro, Brazil	18th (q)	Long jump	6.40 m
2017	World Championships	London, United Kingdom	12th	Long jump	6.46 m
2017	Universiade	Taipei, Taiwan	1st	Long jump	6.65 m
2018	World Indoor Championships	Birmingham, United Kingdom	9th	Long jump	6.41 m
2018	European Championships	Berlin, Germany	15th (q)	Long jump	6.55 m
2019	European Indoor Championships	Glasgow, United Kingdom	5th	Long jump	6.64 m
2019	World Championships	Doha, Qatar	6th	Long jump	6.71 m
2021	European Championships	Toruń, Poland	10th (q)	Long jump	6.53 m
2021	Olympic Games	Tokyo, Japan	17th (q)	Long jump	6.51 m
2022	European Championships	Munich, Germany	11th	Long jump	6.26 m
2023	European Indoor Championships	Istanbul, Turkey	5th	Long jump	6.62 m
2023	World Championships	Budapest, Hungary	3rd	Long jump	6.88 m
2024	World Indoor Championships	Glasgow, United Kingdom	8th	Long jump	6.46 m
2024	European Championships	Rome, Italy	9th	Long jump	6.68 m
2024	Olympic Games	Paris, France	7th	Long jump	6.67 m
2025	European Indoor Championships	Apeldoorn, Netherlands	14th (q)	Long jump	6.29 m
2025	World Indoor Championships	Nanjing, China	5th	Long jump	6.59 m
2025	World Championships	Tokyo, Japan	24th (q)	Long jump	6.37 m
2026	World Indoor Championships	Toruń, Poland	11th	Long jump	6.45 m
2026	European Championships	Birmingham, United Kingdom	14th (q)	Long jump	6.57 m
