= List of Super Wings episodes =

Super Wings (Korean: 출동! 슈퍼윙스, Chinese: 超级飞侠) is an animated television series co-produced by Funnyflux Entertainment in South Korea, Qianqi Animation and Alpha Group in China and Little Airplane Productions in the United States, with the production support from the Educational Broadcasting System and CJ E&M in South Korea.

== Series overview ==
Season	Episodes	Originally released	
Season	Episodes	First released	Last released
1	52	September 1, 2014	July 7, 2015
2	52	March 1, 2017	November 30, 2017
3	40	February 25, 2019	May 21, 2019
4	40	March 30, 2020	June 24, 2020
5	40	March 29, 2021	June 28, 2021
6	40	February 28, 2022	July 11, 2022
7	40	February 27, 2023	May 23, 2023
8	40	December 1, 2023	May 7, 2024
9	40	November 28, 2024	November 29, 2025
10	40	December 6, 2025	May 5, 2026

== Episodes ==
Episode numbers in the original South Korean version are different than those in the international versions (e.g. "The Right Kite" is the first episode of the international version, while "Shadow Play" is the first episode in South Korea).

=== Season 1 (2014–15) ===
—

No. overall	No. in season	Title	Location	Original release date	U.S. (Sprout) air date
1	1	"The Right Kite"	(Nepal) Himalayas	15 September 2014	14 March 2015
Jett brings a kite to Akas and his brother Remi in the Himalayas, to fly in a kite festival together when suddenly the red pandas run away with it; Jett tries to catch the kite a couple of times but fails and gets stuck under a rock; Dizzy shows up with her rescue gear to free one of Jett's legs out of the rock and catches the kite in time for the festival. Package item: A kite kit for Akas and Remi; Word of this episode: नमस्ते (Namaste; Hello) in Nepali Super Wings helper: Dizzy
2	2	"Shadow Play"	(China) Beijing	1 September 2014	16 March 2015
Mei from Beijing, China asks for a shadow puppet for the shadow play; Jett makes dumpling deliveries before the restaurant closes and it's showtime at the shadow play with Mei and her three friends! Package item: A shadow puppet for Mei; Word of this episode: 你好 ("Ní hăo"; Hello) and 再見 ("Zàijiàn"; Goodbye) in Mandarin Chinese Super Wings helper: Donnie
3	3	"Great Gondolas"	(Italy) Venice	2 September 2014	15 March 2015
Jett goes to Venice, Italy to bring a mask for Luca to wear at his masquerade party; however, during the decoration process with Jett, Luca has forgotten to deliver the invitations for the kids; when they run into a waterway traffic jam, Paul must unclog the canal traffic. Package item: A masquerade hat for Luca; Words of this episode: Grazie (Thank you) and Prego (You're welcome) in Italian Super Wings helper: Paul
4	4	"Aloha Adventure"	(United States) /Hawaii	29 September 2014	17 March 2015
Jett travels to Hawaii to bring Kelani a hula skirt that lights up; it looks like an overflowing volcano will block the road on the way to the Best Hula Dancer Contest. Package item: A hula skirt for Kelani; Word of this episode: Aloha (Hello) in Hawaiian Super Wings helper: Donnie
5	5	"Puppies for a Princess"	(United Kingdom) /England	16 September 2014	18 March 2015
Princess Maribelle seeks sparkly collars for her puppies to wear at her royal tea party in England; Jett and Jerome join forces to round up the puppies after they escape and run through the garden maze. Package item: Five dog collars for Princess Maribelle's five puppies Word of this episode: Cheerio (Goodbye) in British English Super Wings helper: Jerome
6	6	"Sahara Sled"	(Morocco) Sahara Desert	30 September 2014	19 March 2015
Jett delivers a sled to Ali in Morocco; he wants to play in the snow, despite that there's none in the Sahara Desert and the sled would only work better with snow. How is Jett supposed to bring snow to a desert? Package item: A snow racer sled for Ali; Phrase of this episode: السلام عليكمقچق (As-salamu alaykum; Peace be upon you) in Arabic Super Wings helpers: Dizzy and Donnie
7	7	"Lights, Camera, Action!"	(United States) / (California) Hollywood	14 October 2014	20 March 2015
Riley directs his first action movie in Hollywood, California; Jett puts on an alien mask and plays a monster. Package item: An alien mask for Riley; Words of this episode: Action (start a movie scene) and Cut (end filming) Super Wings helper: Jerome
8	8	"Bubble Trouble"	(United Kingdom) /Scotland	28 October 2014	21 March 2015
In Scotland, Callum wants a bagpipe that blows bubbles so he can play it for Nessie, the Loch Ness Monster; Callum tells Jett that Nessie will come up if he blows a giant bubble; while he created a bubble so large that the bagpipe got sucked up into itself and Jett not catching it in time before it fell into the lake, Mira dives into the loch to find it in weeds and emerges on Nessie's head when she comes out with it. Package item: A bagpipe with bubbles for Callum; Word of this episode: Aye (Yes) in Scots language Super Wings helper: Mira
9	9	"Race Against Time"	Kenya	10 November 2014	24 March 2015
Jett takes a pair of running shoes that light up to Lorna in Kenya, who's going to run in a race; if she wins this race, she gets to run in a big race with people from all over Africa; unfortunately, Lorna had to stop because of a lost baby wildebeest; Bello comes to gather her mom and dad while he plays a game called "Red Light, Green Light". Package item: Sneakers for Lorna; Word of this episode: Jambo! (Hello!) in Swahili Super Wings helper: Bello
10	10	"Mongolian Stars"	Mongolia	13 October 2014	23 March 2015
In Mongolia, Nambayar asks for glowing with which to decorate the inside of her tent; however, after Nambayar accidentally threw her package in the air that Jett had delivered to, the stars got stuck inside the sheep's wool; Grand Albert comes to round up Nambayar's sheep and get the stars out of their wool. Package item: Glow-in-the-dark stars for Nambayar's ger Word of this episode: Сайн байна уу (Sain baina uu; Hello) in Mongolian Cyrillic Super Wings helper: Grand Albert
11	11	"Samba Spectacular"	(Brazil) Rio de Janeiro	27 October 2014	22 March 2015
Jett brings a feathered samba headdress for Camila who is dancing the samba in a Brazilian Carnival Parade; Jerome helps Camila with her dance moves while Jett fixes a flat tire for her float. Package item: A samba headdress for Camila; Word of this episode: Bacana (Cool) in Portuguese (Brazil) Super Wings helper: Jerome
12	12	"The Pyramid Kid"	Egypt Giza	25 November 2014	25 March 2015
Jett brings an archaeology kit full of tools to Akiki in Egypt; they go inside the excavation site to reveal the Great Golden Cat; when they escape from the inside, one of Jett's legs gets stuck at the top of a giant pyramid; Dizzy shows up with her rescue ropes to save the day. Package item: An archaeology kit for Akiki; Word of this episode: يالا (Yalla; Let's go) in Arabic Super Wings helper: Dizzy
13	13	"Cold Feet"	(Canada) / (British Columbia) Vancouver	11 November 2014	21 April 2015
Drew in Vancouver, Canada asks for ice skates so that he can play on an ice hockey team. Package item: A pair of ice hockey skates for Drew; Word of this episode: Eh? (Right?) in Canadian English Super Wings helper: Grand Albert
14	14	"Gorilla Band"	Democratic Republic of the Congo	8 December 2014	27 March 2015
Jett brings drums for Lulu and Jelani to play in a village festival in the Congo; a gorilla tries out the drums and sounds great but then runs off; when Jett ends up being stuck in vines, Bello comes to get him out and play a drumming game to bring the gorilla back and make some music. Package item: Conga drums for Lulu and Jelani; Word of this episode: Mbote (Hello) in Lingala Super Wings helper: Bello
15	15	"Balancing Act"	(Russia) Moscow	24 November 2014	28 March 2015
As part of a Russian circus, Yuri needs to get a unicycle for his starring role. Package item: A unicycle for Yuri; Word of this episode: Ура ("Ura"; Hooray) in Russian Super Wings helper: Donnie
16	16	"Paper Rangers"	(Japan) Tokyo	9 December 2014	29 March 2015
Jett brings colorful folding paper as origami to Yuki and his friends in Tokyo, Japan to play "Paper Rangers", but one friend, Namiko is moving away; they build a giant Paper Robot as a going away present to her new house. Package item: Origami papers for Yuki, Masako and Haru; Words of this episode: こんにちは or 今日は ("Konichiwa"; Hello) and さようなら ("Sayonara"; Goodbye) in Japanese Super Wings helper: Donnie
17	17	"Viking Voyage"	Norway	23 December 2014	30 March 2015
A Viking hat is brought to Karl in Norway where Jett is mistaken for a dragon; Karl and his campers go on a trip on a Viking ship that accidentally hits a rock which creates a hole in it and heads for a waterfall; Mira arrives to fix the hole from the ship and pushes it away from disaster. Package item: A Viking helmet for Karl; Word of this episode: Tusen takk (Thank you) in Norwegian Super Wings helper: Mira
18	18	"Arctic Run"	(Denmark) /Greenland	TBA	31 March 2015
Jett delivers a compass for Anders in Greenland, to show direction of where he's going in a dog sled race; however, Jett has created a giant crack in the middle of the ice with Anders and his sled dogs floating out to sea; Dizzy uses rescue ropes to bring the ice floe with Jett and Anders back into the race. Package item: A compass for Anders; Word of this episode: Aluu (Hello) in Greenlandic Super Wings helper: Dizzy
19	19	"A Winning Recipe"	(France) Paris	TBA	1 April 2015
Jett delivers a cake decorating kit to Martine in Paris, France; her father, the baker asks her to ice a giant cake for a party at the Eiffel Tower; after decorating the cake, a traffic jam ends up getting blocked for the party; Dizzy uses a rescue board to carry the giant cake to the Eiffel Tower in time. Package item: A cake decoration kit for Martine; Phrase of this episode: Ooh là là! (Oh, my!) in French Super Wings helper: Dizzy
20	20	"Follow That Ghost"	Romania	TBA	2 April 2015
Brigita is hosting a party with her friends from Romania so Jett brings her a spooky flashlight; she hears an eerie sound and follows it; it is her cat Lucy stuck in the rafters; after Jett rescued the cat, he ends up getting trapped in a secret room; to make things worse, the walls are too thick for him to call base (Jimbo) because his communicator receives no signal. Can Jett escape from that part before Dizzy arrives to help him get out? Package item: A flashlight for Brigita; Word of this episode: Poftim (Here you go) in Romanian; Super Wings helper: Dizzy Note: When Jett hears for Brigita's help, she and her friends will use the flashlight that has his wing symbol on it so Jimbo will let them know that Jett's in trouble.
21	21	"Pop Star"	Vietnam	5 January 2015	3 April 2015
Vietnamese sisters Sen and Kim are fans of pop star Kellie; they want to go to her big, special concert for showtime with some pop music onstage but it's sold out, so they just have to listen to her music at their house. Package item: Two Kellie wigs for Sen and Kim; Phrase of this episode: Đi với tôi (Come with me) in Vietnamese Super Wings helper: Dizzy
22	22	"Feathered Friends"	Papua New Guinea	TBA	4 April 2015
Jett delivers a camera to Sam in Papua New Guinea to get some photos of birds in paradise, with his sister Angie; when they can't get a photo of them as usual, Grand Albert shows up and tells Jett to put on a bird costume and make some friends with the birds together so Sam and Angie could take a photo of them flying together. Package item: A camera for Sam; Word of this episode: Em nau! (That's cool! or That's great!) in Tok Pisin Super Wings helper: Grand Albert
23	23	"Paint Pals"	Netherlands	22 December 2014	5 April 2015
Jett brings paintbrushes to Willem in the Netherlands so he can paint a picture; it looks like a rainstorm might end up Willem's painting being washed away; Donnie builds a giant fan to dry the painting before the storm comes in. Package item: Paintbrushes for Willem; Phrase of this episode: Hallo, Hoe heet je? (Hello, What's your name?) in Dutch Super Wings helper: Donnie
24	24	"Fiesta! Fiesta!"	Mexico	TBA	6 April 2015
Two boys have rival birthday fiestas in Mexico. Package items: Two Piñatas for Tomás and Manuel; Phrase of this episode: Feliz Cumpleaños (Happy Birthday) in Spanish (Latin American); Super Wings helper: Paul Note: Ray debuts in this episode
25	25	"Boonying's Bath"	(Thailand) Bangkok	TBA	7 April 2015
Jerome thinks Jett's job is too easy at World Airport so he delivers his package to Nayan in Thailand; Boonying the elephant takes a bath but gets scared by a spray of water and runs off in a forest; Jett arrives to bring Boonying back to bath time. Package item: An inflatable bathtub for Nayan's elephant, Boonying; Word of this episode: สวัสดี ("Sà-wàt-dee"; Hello) in Thai; Super Wings helper: Jett Note: This was the only time Jett didn't deliver the package and his friend Jerome did it instead.
26	26	"Family Time"	(South Korea) Seoul	29 November 2015	8 April 2015
Jett brings a magnetic schedule board to Hye Mi in Korea; Hye Mi's dad has to make mail deliveries because he might not make it in time for family dinner. Package item: A schedule for Hye Mi; Word of this episode: 빨리 ("ppal-li"; Hurry or Quick) in Korean Super Wings helper: Dizzy
27	27	"Fast Track"	Monaco	28 December 2015	3 October 2015
Jett delivers a set of tires for Alex to put onto his hot dog car in Monaco; he has a sister named Adriana, who is part of a racing team to participate in a Soapbox Derby. Package item: A set of tires for Alex's Hotdog Car; Word of this episode: Allons-y (Let's go) in French Super Wings helper: Paul
28	28	"Cheese Chase"	Switzerland	2 January 2016	3 October 2015
Jett takes cowbells to Sven in Switzerland; Jett learns about making Swiss cheese but with mixed results and loses some cheese wheels on the way to market after he startles the horse on the wagon that is driven. Package item: A personalized cheese stamp for Sven; Word of this episode: Sali (Hello) in a dialect called Swiss German Super Wings helper: Dizzy
29	29	"Runaway Rex"	Denmark	2 January 2016	14 September 2015
Jett brings a giant battery for Noah's block dinosaur in Denmark to power up; when Jett tries out the remote control, the battery-operated dinosaur goes out of control and escapes outside and runs through the town. Package item: A "dino-sized" battery for Noah's block dinosaur, Tyblockasaurus Rex; Word of this episode: Velkommen (Welcome) in Danish Super Wings helper: Donnie
30	30	"Zebra Scouts"	Zimbabwe	3 January 2016	10 October 2015
Jett brings a divided wooden box to Tendai in Zimbabwe for a scavenger hunt with her Zebra Scout troop. Package item: A Zebra Scout nature box for Tendai, Munaki and Ruva; Phrase of this episode: Mushe Mushe (Very good) in Shona Super Wings helper: Grand Albert
31	31	"Aussie Animals"	Australia	TBA	17 October 2015
Ruby needs a microphone delivered in Australia by Jett for her show of wildlife. Package item: A microphone for Ruby; Words of this episode: G'day (Hello) and Hooroo (Goodbye) in Australian English Super Wings helper: Bello
32	32	"Penguin Parade"	New Zealand & Antarctica	TBA	17 October 2015
Jett brings a pair of binoculars to Ella in New Zealand; they're taking some penguins to Antarctica, but a waterspout will block their way from getting there. Package item: A pair of binoculars for Ella; Phrase of this episode: Good on ya, mate (Well done, friend) in New Zealand English; Super Wings helper: Dizzy Note: An airplane named Fred arrived at World Airport. The reason for his arrival is that he needs more fuel, in order to continue flying to an unspecified location.
33	33	"The Amazing Moritz"	(Austria) Vienna	3 January 2016	18 October 2015
A top hat is destined for Moritz in Austria, who has a magic show to perform at a theater; as a final trick, Moritz wants to make the piano disappear, but his rabbit Marcel hops on it and rolls away. How is Jett going to bring the piano back to the theater in time for Moritz's final trick? Package item: A magician's hat for Moritz; Word of this episode: Wunderbar (Wonderful) in German Super Wings helper: Dizzy
34	34	"Blast Off"	China	9 January 2016	15 September 2015
A spacesuit for Yun in China ends up going to outer space as a mistake. How will Jett bring Yun back to Earth? Package item: A spacesuit for Yun; Word of this episode: 走 ("Zǒu"; Go) in Mandarin Chinese Super Wings helper: Donnie
35	35	"Fireman Dad"	Germany Black Forest	9 January 2016	2 January 2016
Jett brings a fireman's hat to Stefan in Germany; his dad is a fireman and is coming to school to tell everyone about his job. Package item: A firefighter's helmet for Stefan; Phrase of this episode: Danke (Thank you) in German; Super Wings helper: Dizzy Note: This is the one time Jett went back to World Airport to deliver another package when he told one of Stefan's students at school that his job is delivering packages to kids from all around the world.
36	36	"Square Search"	(Czech Republic) Prague	10 January 2016	20 June 2015
Jett goes to Prague, Czech Republic to deliver a package to Marek, but he moved; Jett goes to Old Town Square to tell the people if they had seen him, but they don't know him there. Would Jett have to send the package all the way back to World Airport? Package item: A marionette for Marek; Words of this episode: Ano (Yes) and Ne (No) in Czech; Super Wings helper: Jerome Note: Maybe Marek will write his new address, so Jett will deliver it to Jimbo.
37	37	"Flying Colors"	India	10 January 2016	16 September 2015
Jett brings costumes to Meena and her dancers in India, but they will need to be colored because they are all white instead of many colors; after painting all of the clothes, a big gust of wind blows them away; Jett tries to catch them all but drops Meena's costume on the way back. Is there a way for him to find her costume quickly before the dance starts? Package items: White clothes for Meena and her five dancers Phrase of this episode: शुक्रीया ("Shukriya"; Thank you) in Hindi; Super Wings helper: Jerome Note: It is unusual how there was a mistake at World Airport when Meena opened her box and it was revealed that all of the clothes were white instead of many different colors.
38	38	"Pirate Booty"	(United Kingdom) /British Virgin Islands	16 January 2016	18 October 2015
Jett delivers a pirate hat to Cassie in the British Virgin Islands to go on a pirate treasure hunt with her uncle Eddie and their parrot Ginger. Package item: A pirate hat for Cassie; Phrase of this episode: "Cheese and Bread" (an expressive phrase of being surprised) in British English; Super Wings helper: Dizzy Note: It is intriguing to see that there could have been sentient beings working alongside humans for hundreds of years. Also, it raises questions about how Woodbeard was made and how he came to life during that time.
39	39	"Flight Fans"	Peru	16 January 2016	24 October 2015
Jett travels to Peru with clothing gear for Pilar and her friends where their uncle, Nestor runs a local airport for small airplanes; unfortunately, Jett is not a passenger plane, so he can't carry passengers on the ride. Package items: Helmets, goggles and scarves for Pilar, Fernanda and Luis; Word of this episode: Gracias (Thank you) in Spanish; Super Wings helpers: Big Wing and Jimbo Note: This is the one time Jimbo has actually left World Airport, in order to become a temporary flight attendant.
40	40	"Toy Trackers"	South Africa	24 January 2016	24 October 2015
Jett delivers a nature book to Dirk in South Africa; someone has been taking toys from all the kids at the Safari Lodge; Dirk follows the animal tracks to find out who snatched them; Paul comes to gather three wild animals, but in the end it turns out that Dirk's dog did it! Package item: An animal track book for Dirk, Mbali and Lina; Word of this episode: Howzit (Hello) in South African English Super Wings helper: Paul
41	41	"Lion Dance"	Taiwan Taipei	24 January 2016	25 October 2015
Jett brings a lion dance costume to Li-Li and Xiao Ming in Taiwan; Jerome teaches the two children to cooperate and dance in harmony while Donnie fixes the costume. Package item: A lion dance costume for both Li-Li and Xiao Ming; Word of this episode: 謝謝 ("Xiè xiè"; Thank you) in Mandarin Chinese Super Wings helpers: Donnie and Jerome
42	42	"Miner Problem"	Bolivia	14 February 2016	25 October 2015
Jett goes to Bolivia and brings a miner's helmet to Angelo; his dog has run away; they go with his grandpa to the mine where they take a wild ride on a mining cart, which breaks while underground. Can they escape from that part and see the sunlight again before Donnie arrives and drills his way through the mine? Package item: A miner's hat for Angelo; Word of this episode: Hola (Hello) in Spanish (Latin American) Super Wings helper: Donnie
43	43	"Snow Ballin'"	Finland	TBA	12 December 2015
Jett brings mittens to Stig in Finland, who wants to build the biggest snowman in the country; he and Jett make an enormous snowball that rolls out of control; then they make another snowball to stop the first one; Donnie comes and builds ramps which bring the snowball together to form a giant snowman. Package item: A big winter hat for Stig's biggest snowman Phrase of this episode: Kiitos (Thank you) in Finnish Super Wings helper: Donnie
44	44	"Wheel Good Time"	Bangladesh	14 February 2016	17 September 2015
Jett brings a bike and helmet to Ruma in Bangladesh and teaches her how to ride it; after a short shower, Ruma's houseboat has floated away. How will Jett be able to turn it around and steer it back from there? Package items: A bicycle and helmet for Ruma; Phrase of this episode: ঠিক আছে ("Thik ache"; okay) in Bengali Super Wings helper: Donnie
45	45	"Santorini Choo Choo"	(Greece) Santorini	20 February 2016	1 November 2015
Jett brings a train conductor's hat and braided rope to Katina in Santorini, Greece so she can play pretend train with all of her friends; however, when Katina and her friend Evie get into an argument of who wants to be in charge of the conductor on the ride, the rope breaks. How is Jett going to bring everyone on top to see the sunset in time? Package items: A train conductor's hat and rope for Katina; Word of this episode: Χάρηκα ("Hárika"; Nice to meet you) in Greek; Super Wings helpers: Donnie and Roy Note: Roy gets to leave the World Airport for the first time. Also, he can transform into a "train", so he can get a head start towards his goal of being one in the future.
46	46	"Rain Ride"	(United Kingdom) / (England) London	20 February 2016	1 November 2015
It is rainy day in London, England so Jett brings a teddy bear that talks to Cecily and she names it Spencer; when she hugs it, it says, "I sure do!"; Cecily and her teddy bear want to play together when suddenly a gust of wind blows Spencer and flies away in Trafalgar Square; Jett tries to catch him a few times but Spencer gets lost somewhere in a crowd of people holding their umbrellas. Is there a way for Jett to find him quickly before Cecily contacts him to see if Spencer was found? Package item: A talking teddy bear for Cecily; Word of this episode: Ta (Thank you) in British English; Super Wings helper: Jerome Note: It is unknown how Cecily managed to contact Jett by his communicator from her house.
47	47	"Fish Friends"	Maldives	21 February 2016	7 November 2015
Jett brings a toy sandcastle to Ayesha's fish, Sir Salty in the Maldives to make him less lonely. Package item: A fish bowl castle for Ayesha's fish, Sir Salty; Phrase of this episode: ކިހިނެހް؟ ("Kihineh?"; How are you?) in Dhivehi Super Wings helper: Mira
48	48	"Jamaican Waves"	Jamaica	21 February 2016	18 September 2015
Jett brings a guitar to Shanna in Jamaica; her family is playing in a reggae band on the cruise ship today; however, everyone forgot to take their instruments off the bus, except for Shanna; they find some instruments on the island but miss the boat; Mira turns a barge into a floating stage. Package item: A guitar for Shanna; Phrase of this episode: Irie (Feeling good or Feeling great) in Jamaican Patois Super Wings helper: Mira
49	49	"The Good Knight"	(Spain) Toledo	TBA	7 November 2015
Jett brings a hobbyhorse to Carlos in Toledo, Spain so he can pretend to be a knight and save princess Isabel from the top of a castle. Package item: A riding horse costume for Carlos; Word of this episode: Vámonos (Let's go) in Spanish Super Wings helper: Paul
50	50	"Wish Upon a Jett"	Turkey	17 March 2016	14 November 2015
Jett arrives with a magic lamp for Asya in Turkey; she wants a genie to grant her wishes but the lamp does not work, so Jett offers to become her genie; Asya wants three ice cream cones, a princess outfit, and a carpet that flies, but the carpet is not magical. How will Jett and Asya make their final wish come true? Package item: A magic lamp for Asya; Word of this episode: Selam (Hello) in Turkish Super Wings helper: Dizzy
51	51	"Farmer Jett"	Southern France	18 October 2016	14 November 2015
Jett takes crystal shoes to princess Colette, who lives on a farm in the south of France; animals cause a lot of trouble on the farm while Jett does the chores for her while she's at a fairytale ball with prince Emile; when Colette comes back from the ball, the farm area is completely messed up; Donnie builds a new barn wall and now the area of the farm looks nice and clean again! Package item: A pair of glass slippers for Colette; Word of this episode: Enchanté (Nice to meet you) in French Super Wings helper: Donnie
52	52	"Acting Up"	(United States) / (New York (state)) New York City	18 October 2016	21 November 2015
Jett brings pairs of sneakers to Trevor and his friends in New York City for a dance company that is rehearsing a musical; Donnie builds a stage called "Feet Beat" in the middle of Times Square for showtime. Package items: Five pairs of dancing shoes for Trevor, Carmen, Su Jung, Victor and Rada; Word of this episode: Encore Super Wings helper: Donnie

=== Season 2 (2017) ===
Note: This is the last German-dubbed season.

No. overall	No. in season	Title	Location	Original release date	U.S. (Sprout/Universal Kids) air date
53	1	"It Came From Hong Kong"	Hong Kong	3 April 2017	TBA
Jett and Shun Yip think there's a monster destroying the city. Can they find out if it's a real monster or an actor in disguise? Package item: A kung fu hero costume for Shun Yip; Word of this episode: 勁 ("Ging"; Cool) in Cantonese; Super Wings helpers: Paul, Mira and Astra Note: Sky is in charge of running the airport, because her uncle, Jimbo has gone on vacation. Also, this episode was first aired in Canada on September 2, 2017.
54	2	"Yeti Quest"	Bhutan	3 April 2017	TBA
Jett and Dema have to find a yeti, but there's a bear cub in danger. How will they save him? Package item: A first aid kit for Dema; Word of this episode: ("Kuzu Zangpo"; Hello) in Dzongkha; Super Wings helpers: Dizzy and Chase Note: This episode was first aired in Canada on September 2, 2017.
55	3	"Swimming Pigs"	(The Bahamas) Big Major Cay	4 April 2017	TBA
There's a storm coming and the pigs have to get back to shore. How will Jett and his friends save the day? Package items: A snorkeling mask for Jermaine and a floatie for a piglet Word of this episode: Tru Tru (Okay) in Bahamian Creole; Super Wings helpers: Dizzy, Donnie and Mira Note: This episode was first aired in Canada on September 3, 2017.
56	4	"The Great Inflate"	(Greece) Athens	4 April 2017	TBA
Nikos uses a muscle suit to fight against hydra, but the muscle suit goes outta control. How will the Super Wings stop it? Package item: A muscle suit for Nikos; Word of this episode: Καλώς Ορίσατε ("Kalos Orisate"; Welcome) in Greek; Super Wings helpers: Donnie and Jerome Note: This episode was first aired in Canada on September 3, 2017.
57	5	"Team Tango"	(Argentina) Buenos Aires	5 April 2017	TBA
Julieta's mother orders dancing skirts for her daughter, so Julieta can have dancing lessons, but she needs to play soccer. What will Julieta do? Package item: Dancing skirts for Julieta; Word of this episode: Vamos a Bailar (Let's Dance) in Spanish; Super Wings helpers: Jerome and Paul Note: This episode was first aired in Canada on September 9, 2017.
58	6	"Tip of the Iceberg"	(United States) / Alaska	5 April 2017	TBA
Yaari drives Tippy across the sea, but Tippy gets stuck between two icebergs. How will Jett and his Super Wing friends save the day? Package items: A sea captain's hat and a telescope for Yaari; Word of this episode: Chiku (Iceberg) in Yup'ik; Super Wings helpers: Dizzy and Bello Note: This episode was first aired in Canada on September 9, 2017.
59	7	"Alp Help"	Switzerland	6 April 2017	TBA
Lena and her dog Biggie ride on Heinz the Swiss Alps train, but Heinz goes the wrong way, and becomes derailed. Can Jett and his Super Wing friends get Heinz back on the train track? Package item: A St. Bernard keg for Lena's dog, Biggie; Word of this episode: Bis Spöter (See You Later) in Swiss German; Super Wings helpers: Dizzy and Todd; Note: This episode was first aired in Canada on September 10, 2017. Note 2: When Jett orders canine help, several dogs in various parts of the world appear. One such place that appears is Beijing and you can quickly see three of the children who appeared in the Season 1 episode "Shadow Play".
60	8	"Think Big"	Peru	6 April 2017	TBA
Mayta and Jett are ready to draw something big in the ground, but it takes forever. What will Jett and Mayta do? Package items: A remote control camera copter for Mayta; Word of this episode: Sulpayki (Thank you) in Quechuan; Super Wings helpers: Dizzy, Donnie, Jerome, Todd and Poppa Wheels Note: This episode was first aired in Canada on September 10, 2017.
61	9	"Dubai Fly By"	(United Arab Emirates) Dubai	7 April 2017	TBA
Saeed and Jett visit Saeed's mother, who's a construction worker, but Hamad knocks off a piece of a building. Can Jett and his friends stop the accident? Package item: A tool kit for Saeed; Word of this episode: شكر ("Shukran"; Thank you) in Arabic Super Wings helpers: Dizzy, Donnie and Todd
62	10	"The Jeju Giant"	(South Korea) Jeju Island	7 April 2017	TBA
Tae-Hun's project is finished for the science festival, but Seo-Yoon's robot goes out of control. What will Jett, Tae-Hun, and Seo-Yoon do? Package item: Last Pieces for Tae-Hun's Project; Word of this episode: 움브랑 호다 ("Umbrang Hoda"; Awesome) in Jeju Super Wings helpers: Donnie and Astra
63	11	"Panda-Monium"	(China) Chengdu	8 April 2017	TBA
Wen and his father in panda costumes and Jett find out that baby panda Min has disappeared. Can they bring her back? Package item: A panda costume for Wen; Words of this episode: 好 ("Hǎo"; Good) and 很好 ("Hěn hǎo"; Very Good) in Mandarin Chinese Super Wings helpers: Paul and Grand Albert
64	12	"The Large Little Laddie"	(Republic of Ireland) Dublin	8 April 2017	TBA
Kian wants to be a giant, but Aiden knocks over Grand Albert's invention, that makes Aiden become a giant. What will Jett, Donnie, Grand Albert, and Kian do? Package item: A pair of stilts for Kian; Word of this episode: Slán (Goodbye) in Irish Super Wings helpers: Donnie, Grand Albert and Poppa Wheels
65	13	"Tricky Trolls"	(Norway) Bergen	9 April 2017	TBA
Hilda's picnic basket gets taken by someone, and Jett and Hilda wonder if they are trolls. How will they get the picnic basket back? Package item: A picnic basket for Hilda; Word of this episode: Kjempegoat (Delicious) in Norwegian Super Wings helpers: Bello, Grand Albert and Todd
66	14	"Magno Dino"	(Canada) / (Alberta) Drumheller	9 April 2017	TBA
A dinosaur skeleton is finished to be put in a museum, but a dinosaur skeleton goes after the tow truck with a magnet. What will Jett, Donnie, Paul, and Justin do? Package item: An excavation kit for Justin; Word of this episode: Kerfuffle (Problem) Super Wings helpers: Donnie and Paul
67–68	15–16	"Trip to Times Past"	(France) Dordogne	15 April 2017	TBA
Jett, Grand Albert, and Margot go back in time to see a real woolly mammoth, but a mother woolly mammoth thinks they are bad guys, until a mother woolly mammoth gets stuck in the hole in the ice. What will Jett, Grand Albert, Margot, and Erk do? Package items: A cave painting kit for Margot, Then for Erk; Word of this episode: Bon Voyage (Have a good trip) in French; Super Wings helpers: Dizzy, Donnie and Grand Albert; Note: 2-part episode; Margot gives away a cave painting kit to Erk, maybe she will order another one. Note 2: In part 2, this is the only time Jimbo calls base (Sky) on his watch while he's on round-the-world trip.
69	17	"House of Ghoulies"	(United States) / (New York (state)) Sleepy Hollow	16 April 2017	TBA
It is Halloween in New York. Irving and Jett check out the haunted mansion, but they are scary creatures inside. What will Jett and Irving do? Package item: A skeleton costume for Irving; Phrase of this episode: Trick or Treat Super Wings helpers: Jerome and Bello
70	18	"Junior Detective"	(United Kingdom) / (England) London	16 April 2017	TBA
Archie and Jett have to find a toy alligator. How will Jett and Archie get it back? Package item: A detective kit for Archie; Word of this episode: Blimey (Oh, my!) in British English Super Wings helpers: Chase and Mira
71	19	"Home Run Julio"	(Cuba) Havana	16 April 2017	TBA
Julio has a baseball lesson, but a meteor is heading toward the baseball stadium. What will Jett and Julio do? Package item: A baseball bat for Julio; Word of this episode: Jonrón (Home Run) in Cuban Spanish; Super Wings helper: Grand Albert Note: Astra does not help Jett because she uses her space laser to get rid of the meteor, but it splits into two instead of being completely gone.
72	20	"Waffle Mix-Up"	Belgium	22 April 2017	TBA
Jules and his grandmother are making a giant waffle, but Jett accidentally adds too much yeast. Can Donnie stop the disaster? Package item: A giant waffle iron for Jules and his grandmother Word of this episode: Grotte (Big) in Belgian French; Super Wings helpers: Donnie, Todd and Poppa Wheels Note: Todd comes to help Jett deliver the package to Jules in Belgium together because one plane isn't enough to carry a giant package from the runway.
73	21	"The Super Seven"	(United States) / Wyoming	22 April 2017	TBA
Susanna lets her friends take a train, but a steam engine gets too much sun power. How will Jett, Dizzy, and Donnie save the day? Package item: A golden lasso for Susanna; Word of this episode: Giddy Up Super Wings helpers: Dizzy and Donnie
74	22	"Whale Tale"	Fiji	23 April 2017	TBA
Jett is on his way to Fiji to deliver a package to a girl named Tima because it has what she and her friends need to dance in the Hibiscus Festival. But, suddenly, out of nowhere, a big whale emerged from the sea and swallowed up Jett! Would Jett find a way to get out of the whale and make his delivery? Package items: Three whales on sticks for Tima and her two friends Word of this episode: Bula (Hello) in Fijian Super Wings helpers: Mira and Chase
75–76	23–24	"The Bermuda Blunder"	(United Kingdom) / (Bermuda) Hamilton	23 April 2017	TBA
Jett is on his way to deliver a package to a boy named Aaron when he is suddenly caught in a terrible storm. He loses his package and is struck by lightning knocking him into the ocean and disabling his communications with World Airport. Can Jett be rescued from the Bermuda Triangle? 1st Package item: A birthday cake for Aaron; 2nd Package item: A bucket and spade for Chelsea; Words of this episode: Crisp (Stylish) and Taunk Ja (Thank you) in Bermudian English; Super Wings helpers: Dizzy, Mira, Chase and Flip; Note 1: 2-part episode; Flip debuts in this episode Chelsea also debuts in this episode Note 2: In part 1, Chelsea gave Jett the phrase here in Bermudian English only just like Sky did. Note 3: Flip delivers the package to Aaron because Jett has lost it due to bad weather conditions and was replaced by another delivery mission (from Season 1 Episode #25).
77	25	"Laugh, Prince, Laugh"	(Liechtenstein) Vaduz	28 April 2017	TBA
A girl named Alessia ordered a laughing kit to participate in the laughing contest in order to make a serious prince named prince Simon laugh. When she arrives to the castle, she was nervous about performing against the other participants. Can Jett be part of Alessia's comedic act? Package item: A laugh kit for Alessia; Words of this episode: Ja (Yes) and Nein (No) in German Super Wings helpers: Jerome and Grand Albert
78	26	"Piano Panic"	(Austria) Salzburg	24 April 2017	TBA
Oswald has a big piano concert today, but the large piano is too big for him to play by himself. What will Jett and Oswald do? Package item: A tuxedo for Oswald; Word of this episode: Schön (Beautiful) in German Super Wings helpers: Dizzy, Donnie and Jerome
79	27	"Mission on Mars"	Chile & Mars	9 September 2017	TBA
Catalina orders a package for her pen pal, Vo, who lives on Mars, but there's no pen pal on Mars. What will Jett, Donnie, Astra, and Catalina do? Package item: A stuffed chilla in a spacesuit for Vo; Phrase of this episode: Mucho Gusto (Nice to meet you) in Spanish Super Wings helpers: Astra and Donnie
80	28	"Christmas Down Under"	(Australia) Sydney	9 September 2017	6 October 2017
It's Christmas in Australia, Jett and Nicole decorate for Christmas, but Santa Claus and his reindeer get tired. Will Jett and Nicole deliver more presents? Package items: Three Christmas stockings for Nicole and her parents Words of this episode: Boomer (Kangaroo) and Chrissie (Christmas) in Australian English Super Wings helpers: Donnie, Bello and Astra
81	29	"Drills and Thrills"	Singapore & Ecuador	9 September 2017	TBA
Rina wants to visit Raul, but Raul is on the other side of the earth. What will Jett and Rina do? Package item: A heavy-duty shovel for Rina; Words of this episode: Swee Swee (Pretty) in Hokkien and Muy Bonito (Very Pretty) in Spanish; Super Wings helper: Todd Note: Raul gave Rina the phrase in Spanish just like Sky gave Jett the phrase.
82	30	"The Dragon Flies"	(Poland) Kraków	10 September 2017	TBA
Jett, Emilia, and her lizard Adash get ready for a dragon festival, but a fly distracts them. How will Jett and Emilia stop the disaster? Package items: A knight costume for Emilia and a pair of dragon wings for her lizard, Adash; Word of this episode: Cześć (Hello) in Polish Super Wings helpers: Astra and Chase
83	31	"Sniff Test"	(Malaysia) Kuching	10 September 2017	TBA
Noriah is having a collection of smells. How will Jett, Noriah and her parents find the big, smelly flower? Package item: A scent brush for Noriah; Words of this episode: Besar (Big) and Kecil (Small) in Malay Super Wings helpers: Dizzy and Todd
84	32	"The Pumpkin Roll"	(Germany) Ludwigsburg	11 September 2017	TBA
Jett, Max, and his grandfather have to take a giant pumpkin to the pumpkin festival, but the pumpkin rolls away. How will Jett and Max stop the huge pumpkin? Package items: Three plastic face parts for Max's pumpkin Word of this episode: Kürbis (Pumpkin) in German Super Wings helpers: Dizzy, Paul and Chase
85	33	"Doubles Trouble"	Jakarta, Indonesia	11 September 2017	TBA
There's a badminton tournament, but Dimas and Dian have got into a big fight. How will Jett and Dimas and Dian's mother find a way to let Dimas and Dian play together? Package items: Two badminton uniforms for Dimas and Dian; Phrase of this episode: Terima Kasih (Thank you) in Indonesian; Super Wings helpers: Flip and Astra Note: Ray has reappeared (from Season 1 Episode #24).
86	34	"Snow on the Go"	Namibia	11 September 2017	TBA
Ndapana has a package from her friend, Stig from Finland, but she knows it never snows in Namibia, until Donnie builds a giant snow globe, and Astra adds snow inside, but the giant snow globe rolls over. What will Jett, Donnie, Astra, and Ndapana do? Package item: A snow globe for Ndapana; Word of this episode: Hello in Namibian English; Super Wings helpers: Donnie, Bello and Astra Note: Stig has reappeared (from Season 1 Episode #43).
87	35	"Mermaid Melody"	(Denmark) Copenhagen	12 September 2017	TBA
Jett, Mira, and Sofia go underwater to find a mermaid, but they saw an oil ship leaking. How will Jett and Mira save the day? Package item: A waterproof recorder for Sofia; Phrases of this episode: Tak (Thank you) and Selv Tak (You're welcome) in Danish Super Wings helper: Mira
88	36	"Dalmatian Doggercise"	(Croatia) Dubrovnik	12 September 2017	TBA
Ivan lets his dalmatian Luna doggercise, but Luna gets away, after Jerome accidentally throws a ball too far away. How will Jett, Jerome, and Ivan get Luna back? Package items: Two exercise outfits for Ivan and his dog, Luna; Word of this episode: Bok (Hello) in Croatian Super Wings helpers: Dizzy and Jerome
89	37	"Barcelona Birdhouse"	(Spain) Barcelona	13 September 2017	TBA
Martha builds a birdhouse for a bird to live in, but the birdhouse is too small for other birds, so she and Jet have to build a giant birdhouse, but it takes too long. What will Martha and Jett do? Package items: Recycled materials for Martha's birdhouse Words of this episode: Sisplau (Please) and Gràcies (Thank you) in Catalan Super Wings helpers: Donnie, Jerome, Bello and Poppa Wheels
90	38	"Cat in the Box"	(Japan) Tokyo	13 September 2017	TBA
Satomi's cat Tora gets taken to the recycling center by mistake. How will Jett, Satomi and her mother get Tora back? Package item: A cat toy for Satomi's cat, Tora; Words of this episode: どこ (Doko?; Where?) and あそこ (Asoko; Over There) in Japanese Super Wings helpers: Donnie and Paul
91	39	"Weather or Not"	Tonga	14 September 2017	TBA
Ofa and her Super Wings friends make their own weather forecast, until a tornado arrives, and Ofa tries to warn everyone, but no one believes her. What will Jett, Donnie, Jerome, Poppa Wheels, and Ofa do? Package item: A microphone for Ofa; Word of this episode: Alotamaki (Bad Weather) in Tongan Super Wings helpers: Donnie, Jerome and Poppa Wheels
92–93	40–41	"Very Special Delivery"	(South Korea) Jeonju & Antarctica	14 September 2017	TBA
Rana's parents are separated, because Rana's mother lives in Antarctica, and Rana's father lives in South Korea, so Jett has to deliver a songpyeon to Rana's mother, but a snowstorm causes him to get stuck. What will Jett do? How will he make special delivery for Rana's mother? Package items: Ingredients for Rana and her father and a songpyeon for Rana's mother Word of this episode: 오늘 (Oneul; Today) in Korean; Super Wings helpers: Paul, Chase and Neo Note: 2-part episode; Neo debuts in this episode
94	42	"Ballet Day"	(Russia) Siberia	14 September 2017	TBA
Nadia and her Super Wings friends are able to dance ballet, but Nadia's father needs help getting back home. Can Nadia and her Super Wings friends save the day? Package item: A jeweled egg music box for Nadia; Words of this episode: Спасибо ("Spasibo"; Thank you) and Пожалуйста ("Pozhaluysta"; You're welcome) in Russian Super Wings helpers: Dizzy, Jerome and Flip
95	43	"The Sheep Heap"	New Zealand	15 September 2017	TBA
Peter works as a substitute shepherd, and Jett makes the sheep go over the cliff. How will Jett, Peter, and Hine get them back? Package item: A shepherd's staff for Peter; Word of this episode: Kia Ora (Hi) in Māori Super Wings helpers: Jerome and Flip
96	44	"Blockosaurus Park"	Romania	15 September 2017	TBA
Yulia's grandfather makes the mechanical robot dinosaurs come to live, but all except Rex go hay-wired, because of the rain. How will Jett, Noah, and Yulia save the day? Package item: A mechanical key for Yulia's grandfather Word of this episode: Uimitor (Amazing) in Romanian; Super Wings helpers: Donnie, Jerome, Flip and Poppa Wheels Note: Noah and Tyblockasaurus Rex have reappeared (from Season 1 Episode #29).
97	45	"The Trouble With Trompos"	Colombia	16 September 2017	TBA
Gabriel and his older sister, Rosana and Jett are going to meet their friends, but, after building a new bridge, and getting Gabriel's trompo back from a monkey, it's getting late. How will Gabriel, Rosana, and their Super Wings friends make it on time? Package item: A trompo for Gabriel; Word of this episode: Amigos (Friends) in Spanish Super Wings helpers: Dizzy and Donnie
98	46	"Mangrove Mess"	Cambodia	16 September 2017	TBA
Nita and her father and Jett have to get all the waterproof toys outta the river, but there are too many of them, What will Jett, Nita, and her father do? Package items: Two scoop nets for Nita and her father Words of this episode: ទៅ (Tow; Go) and បញ្ឈប់ (Banhchhob; Stop) in Khmer Super Wings helpers: Mira, Todd and Grand Albert
99	47	"There's No Place Like Rome"	(Italy) Rome	17 September 2017	TBA
Giuseppe wants a new bike, but a package is for his two younger sisters, who are twins. After that, Giuseppe makes Jett go too fast on the carriage. What will Jett and Giuseppe do? Package item: A chariot stroller for Maria and Francesca; Word of this episode: Veloce (Fast) in Italian Super Wings helpers: Jerome and Chase
100	48	"Speed Hump"	(Qatar) Doha	17 September 2017	TBA
Maryam and her pet camel, Ziz are getting ready for the camel fashion show, but Ziz trips into a wheelbarrow, and runs off. How will Jett and Maryam save the day? Package item: A new hat for Maryam's camel, Ziz; Word of this episode: جيد (Jayyed; Awesome) in Arabic Super Wings helpers: Dizzy and Flip
101	49	"The Spy Who Surprised Me"	(South Africa) Cape Town	18 September 2017	TBA
It's Unathi's birthday, and Jett and Chase hope they will let Unathi's classmates be invited to the party, but the invitations to Unathi's birthday party get blown into the sea. What will Jett and Chase do? Package item: A spy watch for Unathi; Word of this episode: Molo (Hello) in Xhosa; Super Wings helpers: Donnie, Roy and Chase Note: Roy gets to leave World Airport again, along with Donnie (from Season 1 Episode #45).
102	50	"Great Wall of Go"	China	18 September 2017	TBA
Yi enters the race called the Great Wall of Go, but the battery for his go-cart goes dead. What will Yi and his pit crew do? Package item: A battery for Yi's go-cart, Clean Green Machine; Word of this episode: 真棒 (Zhēn bàng; Awesome) in Mandarin Chinese; Super Wings helpers: Donnie, Poppa Wheels and Flip Note: Sammy has reappeared (from some previous episodes (including "Samba Spectacular", "Family Time", "Cheese Chase", "Wheel Good Time", "Jamaican Waves" and "Wish Upon a Jett") of Season 1). Chelsea has also reappeared (from the 2-part episode "The Bermuda Blunder" of this season).
103	51	"Trojan Course"	(Turkey) Istanbul	18 September 2017	TBA
Mehmet has a race of Children's Day, until there are four kids left, but the big rolling horse is driven out of the race by accident. How will Jett save the day? Package item: Nothing for Mehmet; Words of this episode: Acele et (Hurry Up) and Hoşça kal (Goodbye) in Turkish; Super Wings helpers: Dizzy, Donnie, Paul, Big Wing and Poppa Wheels Note: Some children from the previous episodes have reappeared: Riley (from Season 1 Episode #7), Lorna (from Season 1 Episode #9), and Meena (from Season 1 Episode #37). Also, Big Wing gets to leave World Airport again (from Season 1 Episode #39).
104	52	"Loch Ness on Ice"	(United Kingdom) / Scotland	18 September 2017	TBA
Callum and his Super Wings friends are playing curling, but the curling stone with Nessie's babies go too far. How will Callum, Nessie, and their Super Wings friends get them back? Package item: A curling stone for Callum; Word of this episode: Wee (Little) in Scots language Super Wings helpers: Astra and Flip Note: Callum and Nessie have reappeared (from Season 1 Episode #8).

=== Season 3: Mission Teams (2019) ===
No. overall	No. in season	Title	Location	Original release date	U.S. (Universal Kids) air date
105	1	"Wild Horse Heroes"	(Argentina) Patagonia	1 September 2018	September 2, 2019
When a young foal goes missing from a herd of wild horses in Patagonia, Jett and Team Dizzy help a girl named Nayla go on a search and rescue mission in the mountains to find it. Package item: A sketch book for Nayla; Word of this episode: Bonito (Beautiful) in Spanish; Super Wings helping team: Rescue Riders (Dizzy, Zoey & Sparky) Note: Jimbo returns after his trip around the world, this time at a new function at the World Airport, this time taking care of the hangar of the new members of Super Wings.
106	2	"Treehouse Trouble"	(Canada) Rocky Mountains	1 September 2018	TBA
A young boy named Daniel in B.C. Canada asks Jett to bring him a tool kit to help him build a treehouse for his dad. The treehouse is a success but a melting glacier causes a flood of the nearby river and the Super Wings have to think fast to save the day – and the treehouse. Package item: A heavy duty plastic hammer for Daniel; Word & Phrase of this episode: Fantastique (Fantastic) & Bonne Chance (Good Luck) in Canadian French; Super Wings helping team: Build-It Buddies (Donnie, Scoop & Remi) Note: Like Sky, Daniel gave Jett the phrase mentioned here in both English and French.
107	3	"Baursaki Blast-Off"	Kazakhstan	2 September 2018	TBA
A young boy named Maxim in Kazakhstan gets Jett to bring him a package of Kazakh doughnuts so he can give them to his mom, an astronaut who is traveling to the moon; when she blasts off without them, Astra's Galaxy Wings is called upon to help. Package item: A box of baursaki (Kazakh doughnuts) for Maxim's mom Word of this episode: дәмді ("Damdi"; Delicious) in Kazakh Super Wings helping team: Galaxy Wings (Astra, Astro & Rover)
108	4	"Lost in the Everglades"	(United States) /Florida	2 September 2018	TBA
When a toy jet gets blown off course and becomes lost in the Everglades, an impossible place to find anything, it seems like the young boy who owns it will never get it back; Jett calls Mira's Wild Team for assistance. Package item: A stunt pilot's helmet for Juanito; Word of this episode: Atrevido (Daring) in Spanish; Super Wings helping team: Wild Team (Mira, Swampy & Willie) Note: Although they are absent this season, Jerome and Grand Albert make a small appearance at the start of the episode.
109	5	"The Case of the Lost Suitcase"	(Netherlands) Amsterdam	8 September 2018	TBA
A young girl named Tess is excited go to Schiphol Airport in her hometown of Amsterdam, where she will be going on her first airplane ride; Jett brings her a carry-on suitcase, but trouble arises when it goes missing. Package item: A bear-like carry-on suitcase for Tess; Word of this episode: Opgewonden (Excited) in Dutch; Super Wings helping team: Police Patrol (Paul, Kim & Badge) Note: Although Big Wing is absent in this season, it can be seen in this episode a large aircraft similar to him (or possibly himself).
110	6	"Hot Spring Helpers"	(Japan) Nagano	8 September 2018	TBA
A mishap clogs a hot spring in Nagano, Japan, causing several new hot springs to appear; Donnie's Build-It Buddies turn the calamity into a great new water park for both people and snow monkeys to enjoy. Package item: A basket of eggs for Tomo; Word of this episode: 温泉 or おんせん ("Onsen"; Hot Spring) in Japanese Super Wings helping team: Build-It Buddies (Donnie, Scoop & Remi)
111	7	"Webcaster Disaster"	(South Korea) Busan	9 September 2018	TBA
A virus disrupts a computer that is needed for a popular webcast that a girl named Yuna in Busan, South Korea, does with her father, to get the live stream back up and running, Jett and the Galaxy Wings go into the computer and vanquish the virus. Package item: A high-speed train toy for Yuna; Words of this episode: 쿨 & 굉장 ("kul & goengjang"; Cool & Awesome) in Korean (Busan dialect); Super Wings helping team: Galaxy Wings (Astra, Astro & Rover) Note: With this delivery in Busan, South Korea is the second most visited country by Jett and the Super Wings to this day in all seasons (China is still the country that has been visited by the Super Wings to this day).
112	8	"Fun in the Philippines"	(Philippines) Olango Island	9 September 2018	TBA
Three Filipina sisters named Trudis, Judith and Analyn ask Jett to deliver some mics and a stand so they can participate in a singing concert; when they are late setting out for the concert, it's a race against time to get them on stage. Package items: Three microphones & one stand for Trudis, Judith and Analyn; Word of this episode: Maganda (Beautiful) in Filipino Super Wings helping team: Wild Team (Mira, Swampy & Willie)
113	9	"Duck Drama"	(Cambodia) Battambang	15 September 2018	TBA
Jett flies to Battambang, Cambodia, to deliver a duck whistle to a girl named Solyna so she can help her parents herd their ducks into a truck; when the ducks escape, Sky scrambles Paul's Police Patrol to help track down the waddling wildlife. Package item: A duck whistle for Solyna; Word of this episode: ដ៏អស្ចារ្យ ("Aschar"; Amazing) in Khmer Super Wings helping team: Police Patrol (Paul, Kim & Badge)
114	10	"Ups and Downs"	(Germany) Trier	15 September 2018	TBA
When a girl named Louisa in Germany goes to visit her favorite amusement park, she's sad to learn that it is being closed forever; the Super Wings work to give the park a makeover and a whole new lease on life. Package item: A headband with wolf ears for Louisa; Word of this episode: Schnell (Fast) in German Super Wings helping team: Build-It Buddies (Donnie, Scoop & Remi)
115	11	"Cosmic Slam Dunk"	(Spain) Madrid & Mars	16 September 2018	TBA
Jett delivers new basketball shoes to a boy named Manu in Spain who hopes that the shoes will allow him to dunk; when the shoes don't work, Jett and the Galaxy Wings take Manu to Mars, where the lack of gravity should allow him to dunk like a champ. Package item: A pair of basketball shoes for Manu; Word of this episode: Fantástico (Fantastic) in Spanish; Super Wings helping team: Galaxy Wings (Astra, Astro & Rover) Note: Vo reappears (from Season 2 Episode #79) in this episode.
116	12	"Shark Surf Surprise"	(Australia) Gold Coast	16 September 2018	TBA
Jett delivers a surfboard to a girl named Clara who lives on Australia's Gold Coast; Mira's Wild Team is called in to teach Clara to surf, but everyone gets more than they bargained for when they also help rescue a shark. Package item: A surfboard for Clara; Word of this episode: Ace (Excellent) in Australian English; Super Wings helping team: Wild Team (Mira, Swampy & Willie) Note: For the word in this episode, you say "ice" in this case.
117–118	13–14	"Big Bug Problem"	(France) Paris	22 September 2018	TBA
Grand Albert's Telephoto Transformer is mistakenly delivered to a boy named Marcel who lives in Paris. When the camera makes a beetle named Hugo grow into a giant insect it's up to Jett and Dizzy's Rescue Riders to save the city and the Eiffel Tower and shrink the beetle back to normal size. Package item: A camera for Marcel (with an extra item); Word of this episode: Rapidement (Quickly) in French; Super Wings helping team: Rescue Riders (Dizzy, Zoey & Sparky); Note 1: This episode has 2 parts to it. Note 2: Martine and her dad from Season 1 (Episode #19), Kian, Aiden and their father from Season 2 (Episode #64) made their cameo appearances here. Note 3: Unfortunately, Marcel receives two cameras from Jett's delivery mission. He uses Grand Albert's Telephoto Transformer (from Season 2 Episode #64) to make Hugo the beetle grow into a giant size by accident instead of using the real camera to take pictures of him (from Season 1 Episode #22).
119	15	"Underground City"	(Turkey) Cappadocia	23 September 2018	TBA
Jett delivers a hamster exercise ball to a girl named Sachi who lives in Cappadocia, Turkey; her pet hamster escapes in the ball and the Super Wings must try to find the hamster in the underground city of Derinkuyu. Package item: A hamster exercise ball for Sachi's hamster, Emir; Word of this episode: Özel (Special) in Turkish Super Wings helping team: Police Patrol (Paul, Kim & Badge)
120	16	"Camp Fjord"	(Norway) Oslo & Geirangerfjord	23 September 2018	TBA
Jett brings a selfie stick to a boy named Anders in Norway; Jett joins Anders on a camping trip with his father, but things take a strange turn when beavers disrupt their campsite and Jett accidentally destroys the beavers' dam. Package item: A selfie stick for Anders; Word of this episode: Appelsin (Orange) in Norwegian Super Wings helping team: Build-It Buddies (Donnie, Scoop & Remi)
121	17	"Maeklong Market Madness"	(Thailand) Bangkok	29 September 2018	TBA
A girl named Corissa from Bangkok, Thailand, orders a baby carriage to take her kitten in to a famous local market. Chaos ensues when the cat escapes but Dizzy's Rescue Riders arrive to help save the day. Package item: A cat carriage for Corissa's kitten, Tiida; Word of this episode: ไม่ว่าง ("Mai Wang"; Busy) in Thai Super Wings helping team: Rescue Riders (Dizzy, Zoey & Sparky)
122	18	"Sandcastle Superstar"	(France) Mont-Saint-Michel	29 September 2018	TBA
Loic, a boy who lives on Mont-St-Michel in France, wants to build the biggest and best sandcastle ever; with help from Jett and the Build-It Buddies, Loic might just see that dream come true – if they can save the sandcastle from a giant wave. Package item: Sand castle molds for Loic; Phrase of this episode: Très bien (Very good) in French; Super Wings helping team: Build-It Buddies (Donnie, Scoop & Remi) Note: Big Wing makes a small appearance.
123	19	"The Show Must Go On"	(China) Xi'an	30 September 2018	TBA
When a girl named Ling Ling in China gets the role of the Monkey King in a Beijing Opera, Jett delivers a Monkey King's magical staff. The staff proves tricky to use however, and it's soon up to the Super Wings to help save the show. Package item: A Monkey King's magical staff for Ling Ling; Word of this episode: 驕傲 ("Jiāo ào"; Proud) in Mandarin Chinese Super Wings helping team: Rescue Riders (Dizzy, Zoey & Sparky)
124	20	"Backpack for Baraka"	Kenya	30 September 2018	TBA
Jett and the Build-It Buddies help a young Kenyan boy named Baraka rescue scared animals stranded by a rising river. As the team hurries to get Baraka to school on time, he worries he has nothing to show his classmates for show and tell. Package item: A new backpack for Baraka; Word of this episode: Asante (Thank you) in Swahili Super Wings helping team: Build-It Buddies (Donnie, Scoop & Remi)
125	21	"Constellation Situation"	(Italy) Tuscany	30 September 2018	TBA
A girl named Galilea who lives in Tuscany loves the constellations that appear in the night sky; she has even discovered one of her own and has made up a story about it that she is going to tell to her friends under the stars. Package item: A star constellation lamp for Galilea; Phrase of this episode: è fantastico (That's great) in Italian Super Wings helping team: Galaxy Wings (Astra, Astro & Rover)
126	22	"Moscow Metro"	(Russia) Moscow	3 March 2019	TBA
Jett brings a basket to a boy named Huddin in Moscow, so he can deliver some special bread to his mom, who is in the hospital. However, Jett needs the help of Paul's Police Patrol when the basket of bread gets left on a subway car. Package item: A bread basket for Huddin; Word of this episode: удачи ("Udachi"; Good Luck) in Russian; Super Wings helping team: Police Patrol (Paul, Kim & Badge); Note 1: Fred (from Season 1 Episode #32) returns to World Airport again in order to get fuel for himself. Note 2: Stig and his father (from Season 1 Episode #43) made their cameo appearances.
127	23	"Margaret Island Menagerie"	(Hungary) Budapest	10 March 2019	TBA
Jett delivers a Hungarian Gypsy Fiddle to a girl named Petra in Budapest. Petra takes it to an amazing island named Margaret Island, but the animals in the petting zoo there are entranced by the music and begin to follow her everywhere. Package item: A gypsy fiddle for Petra; Phrase of this episode: Ez érdekes (That's interesting) in Hungarian Super Wings helping team: Rescue Riders (Dizzy, Zoey & Sparky)
128	24	"Food Truck Ruckus"	(United States) / (Oregon) Portland	10 March 2019	TBA
Jett delivers a cooking kit to a boy named Juni in Portland, U.S. and helps him make tofu rice burgers in his family's food truck. Dizzy's Rescue Raiders arrive to help as they have too many customers and a burnt patty sets a bush on fire. Package item: A set of cooking utensils for Juni; Phrase of this episode: Yes, Chef. Super Wings helping team: Rescue Riders (Dizzy, Zoey & Sparky)
129	25	"Olivia the Brave"	(United Kingdom) / (England) London	17 March 2019	TBA
Jett delivers a lion costume to a girl named Olivia in London, England. She is easily startled and hopes that the costume will make her brave like her favorite book character, a courageous lion. Package item: An "Albert the Brave" costume for Olivia; Word of this episode: Brill (Cool) and Cheerio (Goodbye) in British English; Super Wings helping team: Police Patrol (Paul, Kim & Badge) Note: Like Sky, Jett gave himself the phrase mentioned at World Airport in British English and English. Also, the word "goodbye" in British English was reused (from Season 1 Episode #5).
130	26	"Seeing the Light"	(Chile) Cape Horn	17 March 2019	TBA
Jett calls in Paul and his Police Patrol pals to help a little girl named Isabella celebrate her birthday in one of the loneliest, most remote locations in the world. Package item: A birthday cake with candles for Isabella; Word of this episode: Buena onda (Cool) in Spanish; Super Wings helping team: Police Patrol (Paul, Kim & Badge) Note: Tippy (from Season 2 Episode #58) has reappeared.
131	27	"Puppies at the Ball"	(United Kingdom) /England	24 March 2019	TBA
Princess Maribelle in England is excited about her five dogs attending a royal ball in fancy costumes that Jett delivers. When a prince attending the ball is scared of the dogs, Jett volunteers to puppy-sit, but the dogs escape. Package items: Five formal dog costumes for Princess Maribelle's five puppies Word of this episode: Posh (Fancy) in British English; Super Wings helping team: Police Patrol (Paul, Kim & Badge) Note: Jett returns to see Princess Maribelle again (from Season 1 Episode #5).
132	28	"Searching for a Manta Ray"	Palau	24 March 2019	TBA
A boy named Ray who lives in Palau, South Pacific, wants to see a Manta Ray in the wild. Jett and the Wild Team do their best to help him find one, but end up trapped in a Blue Hole. Package item: A Pop-up book about Sea Creatures for Ray; Word of this episode: Mechikung (Goodbye) in Palauan Super Wings helping team: Wild Team (Mira, Swampy & Willie)
133	29	"Missing in Morocco"	(Morocco) Fez	31 March 2019	TBA
While on his way to deliver a package to a boy named Omar, Jett gets stuck in quicksand in the Sahara desert. Worried that Jett is overdue, Omar contacts Sky, and Paul's Police Patrol is sent. Package items: A police uniform and equipment for Omar; Word of this episode: لنتحرك ("Lanataharak"; Let's move) in Arabic; Super Wings helping team: Police Patrol (Paul, Kim & Badge); Note 1: The package was delivered to Omar by a mailman from the Camel Express. Note 2: With his knowledge about the Super Wings, Omar could become a new human member of World Airport in the future.
134	30	"Pajama Party"	(India) New Delhi	31 March 2019	TBA
Jett delivers a giant Snakes and Ladders game to Anita who is having a pajama party with her friends. To complete a game challenge, Donnie's Build-It Buddies turn Anita's bed into a princess' carriage. Package item: A Snakes and Ladders board game for Anita; Phrase of this episode: कितना मज्जेदार ("Kitana majjedaar"; How fun) in Hindi Super Wings helping team: Build-It Buddies (Donnie, Scoop & Remi)
135–136	31–32	"Abu Dhabi Thunder"	(United Arab Emirates) Abu Dhabi	5 May 2019	TBA
Jett delivers a costume to a boy named Nav in Abu Dhabi. Jack wears it to an Air Show starring his favorite plane, Thunder. When Thunder gets damaged during the competition, Jack and Jett must take his place and try to fly to victory. Package item: A Thunder costume for Nav; Word of this episode: السلامه ("Salameh"; Safety) in Arabic; Super Wings helping team: Rescue Riders (Dizzy, Zoey & Sparky); Note 1: This episode has 2 parts to it. Note 2: Jerome and Grand Albert made their appearances. Jerome, along with his sister and brother, formed a team called "Team Jerome". Note 3: Grand Albert was one of three judges for the event. Jimbo was the play-by-play announcer here. Note 4: Unlike Jerome, his siblings don't turn into robots. The reason for this is unknown.
137	33	"The Good Doctor"	(Tanzania) Serengeti National Park	12 May 2019	TBA
Jett gives a vet kit to a boy named Adika in Tanzania; and responds to a field call to rescue an elephant in the middle of the road. Package items: A toy veterinarian kit, with a lab coat, for Adika; Word of this episode: Lo (Wow) in Swahili Super Wings helping team: Build-It Buddies (Donnie, Scoop & Remi)
138	34	"Big Swiss Clean Up"	(Switzerland) Grindelwald	19 May 2019	TBA
Robin and his family owned a guest house. They were preparing their inexpensive hotel for guests that were coming for a snow festival. Jett was helping Robin clean one of the rooms, when the vacuum cleaner broke down. After the Build-It Buddies arrived at the house, they created a replacement one for Robin to use. It worked fine, but it was too powerful for Robin to handle. As a result, the vacuum cleaner was picking up everything and getting bigger at the same time. The Super Wings used fondue to stop it from destroying the snow sculptures. However, it spat out a huge cheese ball and it was flying toward the guest house. How can the Super Wings stop the ball from destroying the house? Package item: A toy vacuum cleaner for Robin; Word of this episode: Tolle (Amazing) in German Super Wings helping team: Build-It Buddies (Donnie, Scoop & Remi)
139	35	"Mykonos Marriage Magic"	(Greece) Mykonos	26 May 2019	TBA
Christo's father is marrying Sophie. The marriage ceremony gets underway as planned, but trouble arises when a pelican snatches the wedding ring from Christo. Jett tried to retrieve it from the bird, but it fell into the bottom of the sea. After the Wild Team arrives at the scene, Christo and the Super Wings go underwater, in order to look for the ring. They find it, but it got away from them by a flounder that can hide below the sea floor. To make things worse, a different school of fish was protecting one of their own kind that has the ring. Can Jett and the Super Wings figure out a way to get it from them? Package item: A wedding ring for Christo (actually, it is for Sophie: his new stepmother); Word of this episode: Ώπα (Opa!) (A Greek emotional expression); Super Wings helping team: Wild Team (Mira, Swampy & Willie) Note: At the beginning of the episode, there is a synchronized dance performance. The characters participating in this performance are (in order of appearance): Jett, Paul, Mira, Kim, Roy, Jimbo and the Build-It Buddies (Donnie, Scoop & Remi)
140	36	"Maple Syrup Surprise"	(Canada) / (Quebec) Gaspésie	2 June 2019	TBA
Manon and her family just moved in to their new home at the Gaspé Peninsula. They are preparing to go to a local maple syrup festival, in order to meet their new neighbors. Manon wanted to make maple candies for the festival, but she does not have the proper equipment to make that happen. Even more so, she needed a lot of sap for making the candies. After the Build-It Buddies arrive and created a boiler for the sap, Manon was ready to create her first maple syrup candies. However, Donnie opened the boiler's tap too much and created a big and sticky mess. How are Manon and the Super Wings supposed to use all the sap without wasting a drop of it? Package items: A maple tree tap and a bucket for Manon; Word of this episode: Génial (Great) in French Super Wings helping team: Build-It Buddies (Donnie, Scoop & Remi)
141	37	"Send in the Drones"	(South Korea) Seoul & World Airport	9 June 2019	TBA
Neo introduced a new set of super drones that can deliver packages all over the world to Jett and company. Jett, however, has major doubts about the whole idea. His fears were confirmed, when all the drones in the delivery depot started to malfunction. As a result, the World Airport complex was in lockdown. Can Jett save the World Airport's reputation and get to Si-hoo (with the items) on time? Package items: A toy race vehicle and its remote control for Si-hoo; Word of this episode: 정지 ("Jeongji", Stop) in Korean; Super Wings helping team: Police Patrol (Paul, Kim & Badge); Note 1: Unfortunately, Si-hoo first received an empty box from a delivery drone. Note 2: With this episode, Seoul becomes one of the only cities within the series to be visited on more than one occasion (Seoul (2x): "Family Time" and "Send in the Drones", Tokyo (2x): "Paper Rangers" and "Cat in the Box", Paris (2x): "A Winning Recipe" and "Big Bug Problem", Moscow (2x): "Balancing Act" and "Moscow Metro", Bangkok (2x): "Boonying's Bath Time" and "Maeklong Market Madness", London (3x): "Rain Ride", "Junior Detectives" and "Olivia the Brave", an unnamed city in England (2x): "Puppies for a Princess" and "Puppies at the Ball" (Both deliveries went to Princess Maribelle) and an unnamed city in Scotland (2x): "Bubble Trouble" and "Loch Ness on Ice" (Both deliveries went to Callum).
142	38	"Eye on the Sky"	(Chile) Atacama Desert	16 June 2019	TBA
The Galaxy Wings demonstrated what a black hole was and looked like to Jett. They also explained to Jett the opposite of a black hole: A white hole. After Jett arrived at an observatory in the desert, both he and Catalina saw that Vo, the Rover, was on an asteroid from a telescope. Once the Super Wings and Catalina had successfully landed on that asteroid, they find Vo. The reason Vo was on the asteroid was to go to Earth and visit Catalina. However, Astro saw that they were headed toward a black hole. They could not escape from its gravitational pull and ended up being trapped inside it. How are they going to escape from this predicament? Package item: A friendship bracelet for Catalina; Phrase of this episode: No lo sé (I don't know) in Spanish; Super Wings helping team: Galaxy Wings (Astra, Astro & Rover); Note 1: Jett got to see both Catalina and Vo again (from Season 2 Episode #79). Note 2: Vo loses her doll that Catalina gave it in the black hole from the same previous episode.
143	39	"A Bueno Burrito"	(Mexico) Guanajuato	23 June 2019	TBA
Victor wants to have his own guitar, in order to play it with his friends. However, in order to get one from his mother, Victor must complete 10 different chores in the house and out in the city. Jett agreed to assist Victor complete these chores. Time is against both guys because Victor wants to get that guitar immediately. With the Super Wings' help, the final chore to finish was to get the ingredients to make homemade burritos. After all the shopping they did in the city centre, the only items they need was some tortillas. Unfortunately, the bakery's tortilla-making machine broke down. Victor found out why: one of the machine's conveyor belts was ripped. Once the machine was fixed, Jett added too much tortilla dough to it. Zoey tried to turn it off, but the power lever broke in half and she could not stop it. As a result, the raw dough was so big, it pushed everyone out of the store and sent them flying in the air. How is Victor going to get his guitar, if he cannot receive any fresh tortillas now? Package item: A sticker book for Victor; Word of this episode: Bueno (Good) in Spanish Super Wings helping team: Rescue Riders (Dizzy, Zoey & Sparky)
144	40	"Kiwifruit Catastrophe"	New Zealand	30 June 2019	TBA
Kate is volunteering at Farmer Wilson's kiwifruit farm, in order to pick some fresh kiwifruit from the trees there. Unfortunately, there was not enough rain to grow any proper-sized kiwifruit. After the Super Wings arrive at the scene, they create a water pump and sprayed some water to the tree groves. However, the kiwifruit would need a few weeks to grow into their proper sizes. Donnie suggests an idea of using fertilizer to speed up the growing process. Once Donnie gets a hold of some bags of fertilizer, he uses too much of it, by pouring three big bags of it into the water pump. As the result, the kiwifruit grew into oversized giant ones and creating an avalanche of them. Can they find a way to collect them all safely? Package items: A padded picking bag and a pair of cotton gloves for Kate; Word of this episode: Choice (Great) in New Zealand English Super Wings helping team: Build-It Buddies (Donnie, Scoop & Remi)

=== Season 4: Supercharge (2020) ===
No. overall	No. in season	Title	Location	Original release date	U.S. (Universal Kids) air date
145	1	"Fuzzy Alpaca Furballs"	(Peru) Cusco	2019	2019
A delivery of grooming supplies to Alenca goes awry, when the three alpacas being groomed get scared and roll away after being dried. Package items: Hair dyes and a grooming kit for Alenca; Words of this episode: Napaykullayki (Hello) in Quechua and Muy Hermoso (Very Beautiful) in Spanish Super Wings travel buddy: Dizzy
146	2	"Guangzhou Lightshow"	(China) Guangzhou	2019	2019
Cici's cat created some chaos at a light show in the Chinese city of Guangzhou. Package item: An Emoji laser pointer for Cici; Phrase of this episode: 一起玩吧 ("yīqǐ wán ba"; Let's have fun together) in Mandarin Chinese Super Wings travel buddy: Paul
147	3	"Car Factory Chaos"	(United States) / (Alabama) Montgomery	2019	2019
A car factory nearly goes down in ruins, when a car is built with big monster truck wheels on Father's Day. Package item: A set of car decals for Kevin; Words of this episode: Y'all (a contraction of you and all) in Southern American English Super Wings travel buddy: Donnie
148	4	"Chimpanzee Choo Choo"	(Cameroon) Yaoundé	2019	2019
A toy train soon proves to be troublesome, when a pet chimpanzee drives it far into the jungle. Package item: A model train for Cynthia's Chimpanzee, Cimba; Word of this episode: Félicitations (Congratulations) in French Super Wings travel buddy: Dizzy
149	5	"The Snow Princess"	(Norway) Røros	2019	2019
A new Super Wing named Crystal comes to the rescue, when a town play almost gets postponed because of an excess accumulation of snow. Package item: A dress that shoots out fake snow for Alice; Word of this episode: Fantastisk (Amazing) in Norwegian; Super Wings travel buddy: Donnie New Super Wings helper: Crystal
150	6	"Pig Out"	(Switzerland) St. Gallen	2019	2019
It proves to be a big problem, when five pigs in a pig race are distracted by the scent of gingerbread cookies, causing a food truck to run amok in a giggling fit. Package item: A Gingerbread-scented gingerbread man costume for Teri; Word of this episode: Lecker (Yummy) in Swiss German Super Wings travel buddy: Paul
151	7	"Don't Burst My Bubble"	(Ecuador) Galápagos Islands	2019	2019
Jett and Mira must work fast, when super strong bubbles capture various sea creatures from a beach. Things get more complicated, when a female orca strands itself on the same beach shore. Package item: A bubble wand for Jeremy; Word of this episode: Fuerte (Strong) in Spanish Super Wings travel buddy: Mira
152	8	"Bulgarian Bee Buzz"	(Bulgaria) Kazanlak	2019	2019
Jett and Dizzy deliver a water sprayer to Sylvia. They'll need help from a new insect Super Wing named Bucky, when a water fight and subsequent mud splash on a beehive, causes the bees to get angry at them. Package item: A water sprayer with multiple nozzles for Sylvia; Word of this episode: красив ("Krasiv"; Beautiful) in Bulgarian; Super Wings travel buddy: Dizzy New Super Wings helper: Bucky
153	9	"The Muddier the Merrier"	(South Korea) Boryeong	2019	2019
Jett and Mira deliver a special suit to a child named Gio, who hates getting dirty. As such, he can join his parents at the Boryeong Mud Festival. Unfortunately, the suit malfunctions during the festivities, causing him to bounce around town and out of control. Package item: An inflatable protective suit for Gio; Word of this episode: 신난다 ("Sinnanda", Exciting) in Korean; Super Wings travel buddy: Mira Super Wings helper: Willie
154	10	"Noah's Dinosaur Eggs"	(Denmark) Copenhagen	2019	2019
Noah orders three egg cases, in order to house the baby block dinosaurs he made to give to their respective mothers. However, chaos ensues at the dinosaur theme park, when the babies end up mistakenly imprint on Jett as their mother. As the result, this situation enrages the would-be mother dinosaurs. Package items: Three block dinosaur eggshells for Noah; Word of this episode: Interessant (Interesting) in Danish; Super Wings travel buddy: Donnie Note: Noah returns here, from Season 1 Episode #29 & Season 2 Episode #44.
155	11	"Where Do You Go for a U.F.O.?"	(Australia) Wycliffe Well	2019	2019
A UFO hunt leads to a rescue mission, when a satellite named Orbit crashes in the Australian Outback. The hard part is trying to send him back into orbit and deal with the meteor shower that caused his crash in the first place. Package item: A miniature satellite dish for Mason; Word of this episode: Stoked (Really Excited) in Australian English; Super Wings travel buddy: Astra Super Wings helper: Rover
156	12	"Floating Fruit Fun"	(Thailand) Amphawa	2019	2019
An ordinary birthday cake delivery goes awry, when it attracts some of the hungry wildlife wanting the fruit that is covering it. Package item: A colossal birthday cake for Phra's aunt, Achara; Phrase of this episode: สุขสันต์วันเกิด ("Suk san wan koet"; Happy Birthday) in Thai Super Wings travel buddy: Mira
157	13	"Doll Daze"	Netherlands	2019	2019
When Jett and Bucky deliver a new dress for Nina's doll, they quickly found out that a mother vole a field mouse was taking Nina's things, so that her baby vole could have a tea party. Package item: A doll-sized dress for Nina's doll Word of this episode: Dank je (Thank You) in Dutch Super Wings travel buddy: Bucky
158	14	"Moai Fly By"	(Chile) Easter Island	2019	2019
Kalama orders three large propeller caps, so her favorite Moai statues could keep cool in the hot weather. However, the caps blew so much wind that they send the Moai flying in the sky and all across Easter Island. Package items: Three giant propeller beanies for Kalama's buddies: The Moai statues Word of this episode: Compadres (Buddies) in Spanish Super Wings travel buddy: Dizzy
159	15	"Tractor Triumph"	(United Kingdom) /Scotland	2019	2019
Jett and Donnie deliver a football uniform for Rooney to give his friend, Jack the Tractor, who is participating in a tractor football game. Package item: A football uniform for Jack the Tractor; Word of this episode: Tidy (Beautiful) in Scottish Super Wings travel buddy: Donnie
160	16	"Pacific Rim Roundup"	(United States) /Hawaii	2019	2019
The Super Wings set off for Hawaii to deliver a special vacuum cleaner for Tyler, in order to clean up the sea. Package item: A deep sea vacuum cleaner for Tyler; Word of this episode: Mahalo (Thank You) in Hawaiian; Super Wings travel buddy: Mira; Super Wings helper: Willie Note: This is the only appearance of Jerome in Season 4.
161	17	"Paper Rangers Puppetry"	(Japan) Tokyo	2019	2019
Jett and Donnie deliver large sheets of origami paper, in order to make a life-sized Jumbo Roboto for Paper-con. However, the Super Wings has to work fast, when the life-sized, remote controlled, Drac the Ripper, malfunctions during the stage show. Package items: Large sheets of origami paper for Namiko, Masako, Yuki and Haru; Word of this episode: コスプレ ("Kosupure"; Cosplay) in Japanese; Super Wings travel buddy: Donnie Note: Namiko, Masako, Yuki and Haru reappear, from Season 1 Episode #16.
162	18	"Mongolian Wheels"	(Mongolia) Gobi Desert	2019	2019
Gaspard orders a large set of four off-road tires for his motorhome friend Enjo. They make their way through the Gobi Desert, but Enjo gets overconfident and scares away some sheep belonging to Nambayar: One of Jett's old friends from an earlier delivery. It is up to the Super Wings to roundup the sheep back to her and her father. Package items: A set of four desert off-roading tires for Gaspard's motor home, Enjo; Word of this episode: Баярлалаа ("Bayarlalaa"; Thank You) in Mongolian; Super Wings travel buddy: Donnie; Note 1: This is the first appearance of Grand Albert in Season 4. Note 2: Nambayar and her dad reappear, from Season 1 Episode #10.
163–164	19–20	"Save World Aircraft"	(Nepal) Himalayas	2019	2019
Akas and Remi, the very first children to order their package from the Super Wings, call for a delivery of jumbo-sized art supplies. They need them to support their father on his mountain climbing expedition. Unfortunately, while Jett and Dizzy were delivering the art supplies, the World Aircraft crashes in the mountain range. All the Super Wings members together are the only ones who can save it from destroying a village. Package item: A bundle of jumbo-sized art supplies for Akas and Remi; Phrase of this episode: भाग्यले साथ दिओस् ("Bhāgyalē sātha di'ōs"; Good Luck) in Nepali; Super Wings travel buddy: Dizzy; Super Wings helpers: Crystal, Scoop, Donnie, Astro, Astra, Sparky, Paul and Mira Note: Akas and Remi reappear, from Season 1 Episode #1.
165	21	"Mural Mayhem"	(Colombia) Bogotá	2019	2019
Jett and Dizzy deliver a painting drone to a Colombian girl named Ximena. However, when she is so focused on her mural, her jealous and trouble-making dog, Pepito, steals the drone controls. He then sends the drone on a painting frenzy in the city. The Super Wings need to grab both Pepito and the drone, so Ximena can finish her mural. Package item: A painting quadcopter for Ximena; Word of this episode: Gran Idea (Great Idea) in Spanish Super Wings travel buddy: Dizzy
166	22	"Fairy Tale Fracas"	(Germany) Hanau	2019	2019
A German girl named Kirsten orders a long, blonde wig for the Brothers Grimm Fairy Tale Festival, so she can masquerade as Rapunzel. However, she keeps tripping over the wig. Therefore, Donnie creates a castle tower parade float for her and her friends to ride on. Unfortunately, after the Super Wings pick up Kirsten's friends, her wig gets blown away and jams a wheel on a dragon float in front of them. Then, it causes continually more chaos on the parade route towards the festival grounds. Package item: A blonde long-haired Rapunzel wig for Kirsten; Word of this episode: Wunderschönen (Beautiful) in German Super Wings travel buddy: Donnie
167	23	"The Missing Chapter"	Switzerland	2019	2019
Jett and Astra deliver to Mia a pre-release copy of Dylan the Masked Adventurer's newest book. However, the last chapter is missing! Later on, they meet up with the author, who reveals that he is actually a bit of a coward. When the last chapter's pages get blown away by the wind, the Super Wings gives chase, in order to get them all back. Package item: A pre-production copy of Dylan's new book for Mia; Phrase of this episode: Merci vilmal (Thanks a lot) in Swiss German; Super Wings travel buddy: Astra Super Wings helper: Liberty
168	24	"Czech Clock Commotion"	(Czech Republic) Prague	2019	2019
The Prague astronomical clock stops working properly, when the Super Wings arrive with Pavel. The reason is revealed, when the mother pigeon is trying to save her scared chick that is trapped inside the clock's gears. Package item: A wristwatch with holographic Super Wing figurines for Pavel; Word of this episode: Scholom vas (Good Luck) in Czech Super Wings travel buddy: Bucky
169	25	"Balloon Train"	(South Africa) Cape Town & Pretoria	2019	2019
Jett and Paul deliver self-inflating party balloons to Bundila, so that he can give them, as a birthday present, to his friend Kungawo. Unfortunately, the train they are in is stopped by zebras on the tracks. On top of that, several other animals enter the train because they are lured by the smell of food coming from the dining car. As a result, they prematurely set off the balloons in the baggage car and send the train floating up to the sky. It is up to the Super Wings to save it and its passengers. Package items: 100 self-inflating party balloon bundles for Bundila; Word of this episode: Ugogo (Grandmother) in Zulu Super Wings travel buddy: Paul
170	26	"Dolphin Dilemma"	(Australia) Bunbury	2019	2019
An Australian girl named Kate orders a specially-crafted underwater medical scanner. It is used to examine dolphins around her family's nature reserve. However, a young dolphin gets scared because it sensed an underwater earthquake. Later on, it is revealed that there is another dolphin stuck inside a shipwreck. Jett and Mira need to act fast to save the other dolphin, before the shipwreck sinks further downward. Package item: A special underwater medical scanner for Kate; Word of this episode: Hi, mate (Hello) in Australian English; Super Wings travel buddy: Mira Super Wings helper: Willie
171	27	"Halloween Havoc"	(United States) / (California) Long Beach	2019	2019
Jett and Donnie deliver a Super Wing costume to a kid named Allister, who needs it for trick-or-treating on Halloween. It does not take long, however, for Donnie to get scared by the decorations and costumes. Unfortunately, he gets scared and ends up having a pumpkin decoration covering his head. Things get even worse, when Donnie gets upgraded with his crazy tools, forcing Jett to rely on Kid Wing's help to catch him. Package item: A Kid Wing costume for Allister; Word of this episode: None; Super Wings travel buddy: Donnie Special Super Wings helper: Kid Wing
172	28	"A Day at the Museum"	(Egypt) Cairo	2019	2019
Jett's and Paul's tour of the Cairo Museum goes wrong, when they get trapped inside with Ebony and her brother Noor. To make matters worse, Noor had earlier took a sceptre from one of the exhibits, causing the supercharge energy to bring some mummies, a statue and a sphinx to life. Package item: A microphone and speaker unit, with a pop-out flag, for Ebony; Word of this episode: قف ("Qaf"; Stop) in Arabic; Super Wings travel buddy: Paul Super Wings helpers: (The Nightlight) Dart, Pouncer, Ruffrunner, Shadow, Goggles and Splattertail
173	29	"Holo Heroes"	(Greece) Icaria	2019	2019
Dennis and Shuan are boys who believe in their respective countries mythological figures. They order a holographic battle game that pits Chinese mythology creatures against ancient Greek mythology ones, in order to see which ones are the best fighters. Unfortunately, when they pit the Bull Demon King and the Minotaur against each other, both boys take out their power boost cards to win the game. Instead, the game malfunctions and bring the two creatures to life. Package item: A holographic battle simulation card game for Dennis and Shuan; Word of this episode: Yassas (Hello) in Greek; Super Wings travel buddy: Astra Super Wings helper: Liberty
174	30	"The Wild Wizard Wand"	(United Kingdom) / (Wales) Cardiff	2019	2019
A Welsh boy named Ryan orders a real magic wand. Since magic does not exist in the world, he receives instead a toy wand with a supercharged blue gemstone. Unfortunately, while trying it out at a wizard school day camp at Cardiff Castle, the wand causes all sorts of problems for the other students and the schoolmaster. Earlier, Jett did tell Ryan about reading the wand's warning label, before using it. Package item: A supercharged toy magic wand for Ryan; Word of this episode: Diolch (Thank You) in Welsh; Super Wings travel buddy: Dizzy Super Wings helper: Sparky
175–176	31–32	"A Rockin' Space Mission"	(Russia) Moscow, Moon, Mars & Saturn	2019	2019
Jett and Astra deliver a rock display case to a girl named Nika in Moscow. She aspires to have the best rock collection ever known on Earth. The only problem is that three of the rocks she needs in her collection are not on Earth. The three of them are located on the Moon, Mars and Saturn respectively. First, the Super Wings with Rover retrieved a moon rock, after dodging a meteor shower. Second, the group meets up with Vo on Mars. Along the way, they encounter a marsquake. After that, they got a Mars rock from Vo, to add to Nika's collection. The final part of the mission is for the group to go to Saturn. Once they arrive there, they get trapped in the rings of Saturn. To make things worse, all of Nika's other rocks gets mixed into the rings itself. With the help from the World Spacecraft, the Super Wings retrieve all of Nika's rocks, including a Saturn-shaped one. This accomplishment completes her rock collection. Package item: A rock display case for Nika (Part 1) and three sets of giant chopsticks for retrieving all the rocks (Part 2); Word of this episode: Классно ("Klassno"; Awesome) in Russian; Super Wings travel buddy: Astra Super Wings helper: Rover
177	33	"Amazon Adventure"	(Brazil) Belém	2019	2019
Avelino's father orders an adventure uniform, with an attached life jacket, for his son. He wants his son to see that there is more action in the outside world than his constant video game playing. To do that, Jett and Mira join them on a father-son adventure in the Amazon rainforest. Package item: An explorer's outfit, with a built-in lifejacket, for Avelino; Word of this episode: Incrível (Incredible) in Portuguese; Super Wings travel buddy: Mira; Super Wings helper: Swampy Note: This is Mira and Swampy's last appearance in this episode.
178	34	"A Happy New Year Adventure"	(China) Dezhou	2019	2019
For Chinese New Year, a girl named Siuwan orders an extra long-glowing dragon dance costume for a family reunion. However, when her mother tells Siuwan that the rest of the family is unable to come to the reunion on time, Jett calls for the deployment of the Super Wings Big Team, in order to save the family's New Year celebrations. Package item: An extra long-glowing dragon dance costume for Siuwan and her family. Word of this episode: 新年快乐 ("Xīnnián kuàilè"; Happy New Year) in Mandarin; Super Wings travel buddy: Paul; Super Wings helpers: Willie, Badge, Remi and Sparky Note: This was Willie's last appearance until Season 6 in this episode.
179	35	"Greenland Polar Playground"	(Denmark) /Greenland	2019	2019
Jett and Crystal deliver a set of special ice molds to a girl in Greenland named Acacia. With the Super Wings help, Acacia is making an eco-friendly colored igloo, with a playground inside. Once done, the animals start to arrive towards the igloo, in order to play in there. Later on, trouble arises, when an iceberg threatens to destroy it completely. Package item: A set of ice molds for Acacia that makes ice in eco-friendly colors. Word of this episode: Aluu (Hello) in Greenlandic; Super Wings travel buddy: Crystal Note: The word of "hello" in Greenlandic has been reused, from Season 1 Episode #18.
180	36	"Bottle Boat Bon Voyage"	(Portugal) Porto	2019	2019
Nuno is a Portuguese child, who loves making model boats. In order to prevent his little brother, Lagos, from breaking his latest project, he orders an extremely durable impossible bottle. He would use it to place his ship model inside, with the help from Jett and Bucky. Unfortunately, Lagos begins fooling around with the bottle, with Nuno and the Super Wings trapped inside. As the result, they end up rolling outside Nuno's house, then go through the sewer system and finally onto the Douro river. As a bonus, they end up joining the annual Rabelo boat regatta. Package item: An indestructible impossible bottle for Nuno; Word of this episode: Adeus (Goodbye) in Portuguese Super Wings travel buddy: Bucky
181	37	"King Tan"	(Malaysia) Kuala Lumpur	2019	2019
Jett and Donnie deliver a strong swing for a Malaysian girl named Suri. She ordered it for an orphaned orangutan named Tan. He lives at the zoo, where Suri's father works at. A chaotic misunderstanding from Jett causes an emergency release of the supercharge laser beam. As the result, Tan becomes a giant orangutan. Package item: A strong swing for Suri's friend: Tan the orangutan Phrase of this episode: Terima kasih (Thank You) in Malay; Super Wings travel buddy: Donnie Super Wings helper: Badge
182	38	"Mexican Meow Mission"	Mexico	2019	2019
A Mexican girl, named Daniela, ordered special Marigold-shaped cat treats to her late cat Sánchez. A Mexican tradition states that dead people and pets, from the past, can come back to their loved ones on the Day of the Dead. In order to do that, the surviving family members use the Tagetes flowers to guide their ancestor's spirits back to them. Later on, the Super Wings, Dragons and Daniela somehow end up in another world or dimension. There, they meet Sánchez, who is now able to talk to them. However, a spirit of a stray cat is creating problems to every cat in this plane of existence. How are Daniela and the Super Wings supposed to get back to their world? Package items: Marigold-shaped cat treats for Daniela; Word of this episode: Saludos (Greetings) in Spanish; Super Wings travel buddy: Astra; Super Wings helpers: (The Rescue Riders) Burple, Aggro, Winger, Cutter, Summer, Melodia, Azymondias, Feathers, Dart, Pouncer, Ruffrunner, Shadow and Light Fury Note: This is the second appearance of Grand Albert in Season 4.
183	39	"Cricket Boat and Bowl"	Bangladesh	2019	2019
One of Jett's old friends, Ruma, orders a tabletop cricket game for her and her classmates on a floating school. Unfortunately, the school is too small for playing regular-sized cricket. When the tabletop version of the game proves to be too small for everyone, Jett and Dizzy decided to make a cricket pitch out of nearby spare rafts. What everyone did not know is that the makeshift pitch ends up blocking the river's central area for the other boats to use. How would the children play cricket now? Package item: A tabletop cricket game for Ruma's floating school Word of this episode: গামা ("Gāmā"; Awesome) in Bengali; Super Wings travel buddy: Dizzy; Super Wings helper: Astra Note: Ruma reappears, from Season 1 Episode #44.
184	40	"Cotton Candy Catastrophe"	(France) Toulouse	2019	2019
Jett and Donnie deliver a special cotton candy machine to a boy named Olivier. He and his father plan on serving vegetarian animal confections at their booth in a world culture fair. Unfortunately, one of the customers ordered a particularly large Earth-shaped treat that ends up creating chaos in the fair grounds. Package item: A cotton candy machine for Olivier that can make cotton candy out of vegetables Word of this episode: Bonne idée (Good idea) in French; Super Wings travel buddy: Donnie Super Wings helper: Remi

=== Season 5: Super Pets (2021) ===
No. overall	No. in season	Title	Location	Original release date	U.S. (Universal Kids) air date
185	1	"Super Wings Day"	World Airport	2020	2020
Package item: None; Word of this episode: None Super Wings helper: Super Pets (Jett Pet, Dizzy Pet, Donnie Pet, Paul Pet and Astra Pet)
186	2	"Butterfly Rescue"	(Mexico) Michoacán	2020	2020
Jett goes to Mexico to deliver with Jett Pet a Butterfly costume to Andrea who wants to see the Monarch butterflies making their annual migration. Package item: A Butterfly costume and a flower crown to Andrea; Word of this episode: Perfecto (Perfect in Spanish); Super Wings helper: Dizzy and Dizzy Pet Note: Jett does not go with his travel buddy, but Jett only goes with Jett Pet.
187	3	"Pisa Pasta Panic"	(Italy) Pisa	2020	2020
Mario ordered Jett a spaghetti machine during a competition that makes the biggest spaghetti in existence. But the participation of Golden Boy in the contest may upset the course of the competition. Package item: fresh dough machine for Mario; Word of this episode: Bellissimo (Very beautiful in Italian) Super Wings helper: Donnie and Donnie Pet
188	4	"Spinning Tops"	(Japan) Sapporo	2020	2020
Jett and Jett Pet come in the Odori Park to deliver Kenta a gigantic competition spinning top, but once they reach the final, they have to fight Golden Boy once again. Package item: A spinning top for a tournament for Kenta; Word of this episode: すごい ("Sugoi"; Amazing) in Japanese Super Wings helper: Astra and Astra Pet
189	5	"Baby Tiger Delivery"	(India) Madhya Pradesh	2020	2020
A Young girl living in the jungle ordered a cat's toys to be able to get out the animal that has been hiding in her house, but it turns out that the animal in question is actually a baby tiger who has lost her mother. Jett, Shabu, and Jett Pet must quickly find her to return it to him through the jungle. Package item: Plastic mouse and cat treats for Shabu; Word of this episode: प्यारा ("Pyaara", Sweet, adorable, cute in Bangla) Super Wings helper: Paul and Paul Pet
190	6	"Geneva Car Show Chaos"	(Switzerland) Geneva	2020	2020
Leah lives in Geneva, and she's ordered to the Super Wings a pair of propellers for his new electronic car: Leo, who is going to participate in the city car show. But once they arrive, they have to come to the aid of an all-terrain vehicle that Golden Boy has gotten out of control. Package item: Two ears with propellers for Leah's electric car: Leo; Word of this episode: Biensûr (Sure in Swiss French); Super Wings helper: Dizzy and Dizzy Pet; Note: Leo, like Flip in Season 2, is not a Super Wing at the base, he joins them at the end of the episode. Note 2: Sky answers the call in this episode for Super help because Jimbo is at the car show.
191	7	"A Very Special Concert"	(United States) Mojave Desert	2020	2020
Jett leaves for the Mojave Desert to present an admirers card to his old friend Trevor, now a famous singer. Except that a twist will prevent them from going to New York where they had planned to do their concert, luckily the new Super Wing, Sunny, comes to save the show. Package item: An admirer card made for Trevor by Tom. Word of this episode: Merci beaucoup (Thank you so much in French); Super Wings helper: Sunny and Sunny Pet Note: Trevor from Season 1 Episode 52 returns in this episode.
192	8	"Airport Museum Adventure"	(South Korea) Seoul	2020	2020
Jett and Jett Pet leave for the South Korea Aviation Museum to deliver a young girl named Minji an aviation suit as she will meet the old plane that accompanied her grandfather, except that he does not seem to have arrived at his destination. Package item: A child size aviator suit . Word of this episode: 만나서 반가워 (mannaseo bangawo or bangawo "Nice to meet you" in Korean); Super Wings helper: Donnie and Donnie Pet Note: Narae appeared in this episode. It's not a Super Wings member, but the mascot of the museum.
193	9	"Swedish Snowstorm Sleepover"	(Sweden) Stockholm	2020	2020
A girl named Lily organizes a sleepover with her friend Karin, her father ordered a phone for her to finally let her know where she is, except that she is trapped in the snow. Jett, Astra, and the Super Pets are going to help her out of the room so the girls can have their sleepovers. Package item: A phone with geolocation for children for Lily . Word of this episode: Hurra (Horray) in Swedish Super Wings helper: Astra and Astra Pet
194–195	10–11	"Super Moon Super Save"	China & Moon	2020	2020
It's the Supermoon, and on this occasion, the Super Wings and Storm want to make a surprise for the children of the whole world, Ressiou just wants to see what it is and has ordered a super powerful telescope to see better, but Golden Boy comes to interrupt the party with a counterfeit golden moon. Jett tries to stop it except that the wired moon bounces off the Super Moon which causes it to deviate from its Earth orbit, causing climatic catastrophes. After a failed attempt to return to orbit, the Moon heads straight for the Sun. Donnie and Jett must build their new robot suit to fix this disaster. Package item: A super powerful telescope for Ressiou. Word of this episode: 好主意 (Hǎo zhǔyì; "Good Idea") in Mandarin Chinese Super Wings helper: Crystal, Paul, Paul Pet, Badge, Dizzy, Dizzy Pet, The Galaxy Wings (Rover, Astra, Astro and Astra Pet), Donnie and Donnie Pet
196	12	"The Case of the Missing Town"	(United States) / (Alaska) Whittier & Hawaii	2020	2020
A little girl named Amka ordered a sweater for her dog Nacho to get through the very cold winter in Alaska. Except that she doesn't have the good surprise to discover Golden Boy and not Jett who gives her the package. As a result of Golden Boy's unsuccessful attempt to allow Amka and the rest of the building to spend the winter in Hawaii, Amka's dog gets lost in the ocean. The Super Wings must intervene quickly. Package item: A sweater that keeps you warm to spend the winter for Amka's dog: Nacho. Word of this episode: Unknown; Super Wings helper: Paul, Paul Pet, Jett and Jett Pet Note: Like in the Season 1 episode "Boonying Bath Time", Season 2 double episode "Bermuda Blunder" and Season 3 episode "Send in the Drones", another plane replaces Jett for its delivery, in this case in this one, it's Golden Boy.
197	13	"Digging for Truffles"	(France) Dordogne	2020	2020
A young French girl named Sandrine has ordered a special device from the Super Wings that detects truffles buried in the ground, except that by losing her pig and Jett Pet, Jett has to call the Super Wings to the rescue. Package item: A truffle detector. Word of this episode: Va chercher (Fetches in French) Super Wings helper: Bucky, Paul and Paul Pet
198	14	"Rock 'n' Troll"	Iceland	2020	2020
Jett goes to the Icelandic mountains, a place where according to the legends, would be populated by fantastic creatures such as the Trolls or the Elves, it is precisely one of these creatures that fascinates Magnus, who ordered a special house for these beings and meet them. Except Golden Boy wants to prevent that. Package item: An elf house for Magnus. Word of this episode: Velkomin (Welcome in Icelandic) Super Wings helper: Dizzy, Dizzy Pet and Sparky
199	15	"Super Pet Sweep Up Surprise"	World Airport	2020	2020
All of the Super Wings are at World Airport to clean up the World Aircraft, except that the Super Pets are delaying the operation by wanting to help them. To keep them occupied, Storm instructs his little sister, Windy, to keep them away until the cleaning is finished, everything but that a new manigance from Golden Boy, who wants to try to get rid of the Mini creatures, may well cause tasks. Now is the time to remove the dirt with Jett and the Super Wings. Package item: None; Word of this episode: None; Super Wings helper: Jett and Sparky; Note 1: This episode introduces Storm's little sister, Windy. Note 2: Like in the "Super Wings Day" episode, there is no delivery made. This episode can be considered as filler.
200	16	"The Great Desert Dash"	(Egypt) Giza	2020	2020
A race across the Sahara is organized, and on this occasion, Nailah ordered to the Super Wings a tablet in which she can geolocate during the race. But a mystery contestant is determined to win the trophy. Package item: A geolocalization tablet for Nailah. Word of this episode: بالتوفيق (bialtawfiq, Good luck) in Arabic); Super Wings helper: Leo and Leo Pet Note: Mambo, the all-terrain vehicle that appeared in the episode "Geneva Car Show Chaos", is back in this episode.
201	17	"Little Bugs, Big Trouble"	(Costa Rica) La Fortuna	2020	2020
Jett and Jett Pet set off to deliver a package to Costa Rica for Adrian, who sets up an insect safari through the jungle, but Golden Boy decides to appropriate a particularly golden species of beetle. Jett must quickly get them back before he leaves the jungle. Package item: A Bug suit to Adrian. Word of this episode: Vámonos (Let's go) in Spanish) Super Wings helper: Dizzy and Dizzy Pet
202	18	"Lost Toys in Dreamland"	(Germany) Giengen	2020	2020
A mom ordered a teddy bear named Ute for her daughter Rachel because she lost her teddy bear named Lizzy. To help her, Jett, Astra, Squirt, their new friend Znap, and the Super Pets return to Rachel's dream to find Lizzy in toy land. Package item: A very special teddy bear named Uma for Rachel. Word of this episode: Gute Reisa (Safe travels) in German) Super Wings helper: Astra and Astra Pet
203	19	"Broadcast Station Commotion"	(South Korea) Seoul	2020	2020
A young boy named Yujun goes to visit TV studios with his father and little brother, Yown. In order not to lose sight of him, Jett brings him special bracelets to keep him close, but Yown's curiosity breaks the thread and becomes untraceable. Package item: Tracer bracelets for Yujun. Word of this episode: 멋져요! (Meosjida, Cool) in Korean) Super Wings helper: Sunny and Sunny Pet
204	20	"My New Neighbor"	(New Zealand) Dunedin	2020	2020
A boy named Oliver ordered a pair of speed selector and a battery for his bike from the Super Wings, as he would like to ride Baldwin Street, which is New Zealand's steepest road. But losing control of its speed, the bike crashes into a moving house, Oliver, the Super Wings, and the young girl who just moved in, Mila, must quickly collect things from across the street. Package item: A speed selector for Oliver's bike Word of this episode: Hoa-Noho (Residents, Flatmates) in Maori Super Wings helper: Paul and Paul Pet
205	21	"Alien Movie Stars"	(Argentina) Capilla del Monte	2020	2020
Jett and Jett Pet go to Argentina, to a festival dedicated to aliens, deliver a camera to Santiago so that he can shoot a science fiction film. It is when he confuses Golden Boy into an alien (in disguise) that he begins shooting the film. But Golden Boy's golden UFO spirals out of control and is forced to team up with Jett and the Super Wings to help Santiago make his movie a success. Package item: A camera for Santiago; Word of this episode: Recopado (Fantastic) in Spanish); Super Wings helper: Astra, Astra Pet and Golden Boy Note: This is the first episode in the season in which Golden Boy doesn't fight or trick the Super Wings and joins them to save the situation.
206	22	"Flying Clouds of Color"	Nepal	2021	2021
A young girl named Bhanu has ordered an all-white dress from Jett that she wants to wear on a friend's birthday. Except that the party is held on the same day as Holi, the festival of colors. And to make matters worse, Golden Boy, who also appears, is determined to sprinkle them with glitter yellow color. Package item: A white dress for Bhanu; Word of this episode: सुन्दर ("Sundar", Beautiful) in Hindi) Super Wings helper: Paul and Paul Pet
207	23	"Puppet Problems in Pilsen"	(Czech Republic) Pilsen	2021	2021
Jett flies to Pilsen to deliver a secret puppet to a boy named Alex, as he is going to participate in the city's puppet festival. They organize a show about an ancient legend from the Czech Republic. Except that Golden Boy interrupts the play with his own puppet. Except after a few problems, he finds himself tangled in the threads of a giant dragon-shaped puppet. Will Jett and Donnie's robot suits help him break free? Package item: It's Secret; Word of this episode: Děkuju (Thanks You) in Czech); Super Wings helper: Donnie, Donnie Pet and Remi Note: Donnie and Jett's robotic suits are used again after the episode "Super Moon Super Save".
208	24	"Runaway Piggy Bank"	(Italy) Rome	2021	2021
Jett and Jett Pet deliver a piggy bank that can move to Lorenzo, so he can fill it with coins, except that she escapes from his house and heads for the Trevi Fountain. It becomes gigantic after having sucked all the coins present in the basin, Jett and Donnie must return the recovered coins and return the piggy bank to its normal size. Package item: A moving piggy bank and a key for Lorenzo; Word of this episode: Ritorna (Come Back) in Italian) Super Wings helper: Donnie and Donnie Pet
209	25	"The Rain Dragon"	(China) Zhangjiajie	2021	2021
Yenyen ordered a small lucky bag so that she could give it to the golden dragon in the cave in addition to wishing for it to rain so that her grandfather's plantations would be saved from the heat. Except that Golden Boy overheard Jett and Yenyen's conversation and intends to make her wish come true for him. Package item: A little lucky bag for Yenyen; Word of this episode: 福 袋 (Fúdài, lucky bag) in Chinese); Super Wings helper: Astra, Astra Pet and Sparky Note: This is the second episode of the series in which a Mission Teams vehicle comes to help a member of another team, following the episode "King Tan" of Season 4 with Badge, helping Jett and Donnie. In this episode, it's Sparky who comes to help Jett and Astra.
210	26	"Newfoundland Snow Wonderland"	(Canada) / (Newfoundland and Labrador) St. John's	2021	2021
Trisha and her class go on a school trip to a weather station to understand how snow forms, she has for the occasion ordered from Jett and Jett Pet a pair of gloves and a hat to be ready if the snow falls. Jett, Trisha and the rest of the class want to see the formation of snow for real, helped by Astra and Sisu coming in as a backup. Package item: A woolen hat and gloves for Trisha; Word of this episode: Frais (Fresh in Canadian French ) Super Wings helper: Sisu, Astra and Astra Pet Note: Rover makes a very short appearance in this episode as a weather satellite.
211	27	"Happy Birthday Fishes"	Vanuatu	2021	2021
Chay ordered waterproof invitation cards to be able to go underwater because she is celebrating her birthday. She goes with Jett to the unique Vanuatu submarine post office. Except that fish take the fruit hanging on the letters, risking delaying delivery. Paul and Paul Pet are called in to save the party. Package item: Impermeable invitation cards for Chay; Word of this episode: Hapi betde (Happy Birthday in Bislama); Super Wings helper: Paul, Paul Pet and Badge Note: Sammy, the forklift, makes an appearance in the introduction segment of the episode since his cameo in the episode "Manta Ray" in Season 3, as well as Seasons 1 and 2.
212	28	"Happy Mother's Day"	(Australia) Adelaide	2021	2021
A delivery problem between Jett and Golden Boy delays the arrival of the package that Grace expects for Mother's Day, Golden Boy proposes to catch Grace's mother's plane, but ends up causing the plane to crash. Jett and Dizzy must rescue the flight. Package item: A bouquet of white Chrysanthemums for Grace; Word of this episode: Fair Dinkum (That's the True) and Bye Mate (Goodbye) in Australian English; Super Wings helper: Dizzy, Dizzy Pet and Golden Boy; Note 1: This is the second episode in which Golden Boy helps the Super Wings to repair a disaster. Note 2: Also, this episode introduces Jimbo's mother, who is invited to follow Jett's mission.
213	29	"There's a Shark in My Water Park"	(Austria) Lutzmannsburg	2021	2021
Jett and Jett Pet leave for a water park to deliver a cart to Lukas in which he can transport his catfish aquarium. But when he falls into the water and scares visitors, Jett, Dizzy and the Super Pets must retrieve him through the park's attractions. Package item: A cart used to transport heavy objects for Lukas; Word of this episode: Lass uns gehen (Let's go in German) Super Wings helper: Dizzy and Dizzy Pet
214	30	"Hamster Disaster"	(United Kingdom) / (England) London	2021	2021
An accident during a portal demonstration of Astra prevents Jett from making his next delivery to London. So it's up to Astra and Mini Astra to deliver a hamster wheel to Mark, except he escapes the house and, with Astra's failed attempt to bring the hamster home, makes him in turn giant and make go to the London Eye. Package item: A hamster wheel for Mark. Word of this episode: Chuffed (Proud in British English); Super Wings helper: Jett and Jett Pet Note: This is the second episode of the season in which another plane replaces Jett, following the episode "The Case of the Missing Town" with Golden Boy, in this one, it's Astra and Astra Pet.
215	31	"Perez the Mouse"	(Uruguay) Montevideo	2021	2021
Jett and Jett Pet go to Uruguay deliver Selena a tooth box, because she has lost her first baby tooth. Selena's father asks Jett for help as he wants to bring his daughter a gold coin while disguised as Perez, the mouse who brings a coin to children when they lose a tooth in their sleep. But that's without counting the intervention of Golden Boy who wants to bring the coin to Selena himself. Package item: A toothbox for Selena; Word of this episode: Volemos (Let's fly in Spanish); Super Wings helper: Donnie, Donnie Pet and Bucky Note: This is the second episode in which Bucky accompanies the super helps on the mission to help them, following the episode "Digging for Truffles".
216	32	"Rock Spirit Family"	Finland	2021	2021
Petri, a famous heavy metal rock star in Finland, ordered a wig for his father to become more rock and roll than his son. Except that by letting himself be carried away by the atmosphere, he bypasses all the lights on the stage. Package item: A rock star wig for Petri's father. Word of this episode: Äänekäs (Loud in Finnish ) Super Wings helper: Sunny and Sunny Pet
217	33	"Relay Delivery"	(Canada) / (Ontario) Toronto & Tanzania	2021	2021
Jett and Jett Pet leave to deliver various toys for Kamili's cousin so that he can go back to school for the first time. All donated by friends all over the world, except when they arrive in Mount Kilimanjaro, not everything goes as planned. Package item: A giant bag for Kamili; Word of this episode: C'est super (That's Great in French ) Super Wings helper: Leo and Leo Pet Note: In this episode, Jett comes to visit children who appeared in previous episodes: Nayla and Galilea, respectively appeared in the episodes "Wild Horse Heroes" and "Constellation Situation" in Season 3. As well as Bhanu in the recent episode "Flying Clouds of Colors" in Season 5.
218–219	34–35	"Jurassic Journey"	Mongolia	2021	2021
Nambayar found a dinosaur egg, a fossil of a recent discovery in Mongolia, except that by installing the egg in the incubator that Jett and Jett Pet brought her, Coco, a baby tyrannosaurus rex, is born. With Storm's help, Jett, also with Dizzy and Donnie and their Super Pets, set off in Jurassic period to try and find Coco's mother. Except that several adventures put them to the test (a brachiosaur which is stamped in a rock wall, several dinosaurs at risk of falling from a precipice). It wasn't until Storm came to the rescue with Jett and Donnie's robot suits that Coco finally found her mother, who was chasing Golden Boy, also present. Package item: An incubator for Nambayar; Word of this episode: мөрөөдөл ("möröödöl", Dream) in Mongolian; Super Wings helper: Dizzy, Dizzy Pet, Donnie, Donnie Pet and Storm; Note: Nambayar from Season 1 Episode 10 and Season 4 Episode 18 returns in this episode. Note 2: This is the second special episode in which Jett and the Super Wings travel to the past, following the double episode "Trip to Time Past" in Season 2.
220	36	"Happy the Super Pup"	Singapore	2021	2021
Jett and Jett Pet bring Lyu, a young girl who lives in Singapore, a little robot dog named Happy. Gift from her father because the young girl dreams of having a dog. Except that wanting to play with him, Happy, Jett Pet and several other dogs end up interrupting the kite party. Jett and Dizzy must then save Happy and one of the puppies, trapped in the wires of a kite. Package item: A robot dog for Lyu; Word of this episode: Budak baik (Good boy in Malay ) Super Wings helper: Dizzy and Dizzy Pet
221	37	"Special Trip Around the World"	(France) Paris & (Egypt) Giza	2021	2021
A young boy named Victor dreams of traveling the world, so he ordered Jett and Jett Pet a board game so he can make his dream come true. But the game will turn out to be much more eventful when Golden Boy joins them to win the game. Package item: A travel game around the world for Victor; Word of this episode: Génial (Awesome in French ) Super Wings helper: Paul, Paul Pet and Golden Boy Note: Among the many places where Jett, Jett Pet, Victor and Golden Boy go to play the Travel Around the World game are Hawaii, Pisa, New York, Easter Island as well as Giza
222	38	"The Flying Playhouse"	(Azerbaijan) Baku	2021	2021
Jett and Jett Pet travel to Baku to deliver the twin sisters Fatima and Perry a cardboard cabin so that they can store their toys. Except the cabin breaks and Jett asks Donnie for help building a bigger cabin for the two sisters. Package item: A cardboard cabin for Fatima and Perry; Word of this episode: Tez Olun (Be quickly in Azeri ) Super Wings helper: Donnie, Donnie Pet and Remi
223	39	"Farm Friends Fetch"	Germany	2021	2021
Jett and Jett Pet leave to deliver a package to a farm in Germany, where Greta is waiting for him. This is a hat that can turn into a frisbee, because she wants to have fun with the animals on her grandmother's farm. But when the hat gets lost in the forest along with the animals, Jett must call on Sunny's positive energy to find them through the forest. Package item: A farmer's hat that can turn into a frisbee for Greta; Word of this episode: Fantastisch (Fantastic in German ) Super Wings helper: Sunny and Sunny Pet
224	40	"Royal Puppy Campers"	(United Kingdom) /England	2021	2021
Jett and Jett Pet go to find Maribelle and Dominique who go camping with the little royal dogs. Except that once arrived there and following a game that turns into a disaster, a bear begins to pursue them through the forest. Package item: Small motorhomes for the puppies of Maribelle; Word of this episode: Collywobbles (Being nervous in British English ) Super Wings helper: Leo and Leo Pet; Note: Princess Maribelle from Season 1 Episode 5 & Season 3 Episode 27 returns in this episode. Note 2: Prince Dominique from Season 3 Episode 27 returns in this episode too.

=== Season 6: World Guardians (2022) ===
No. overall	No. in season	Title	Location	Original release date	U.S. (Universal Kids) air date
225	1	"Fire Drill Heroes"	(Brazil) Amazon rainforest	2021	2021
Lidia and her class participate in a fire drill led by the girl's mother. But when a forest fire breaks out in the Amazon rainforest, she must quickly deal with it. Can Lidia handle another forest fire on her own while her mother is busy with the first fire? Luckily, Jett and the World Guardians, the new Super Wings team, are ready to help her Package item: A firefighter costume for Lidia; Word of this episode: Rápido (fast in Portuguese); Super Wings World Guardians helper: Dizzy, Splash and Sparky; Super Ball Power used: Water Power Note: Jett now delivers the items in a new package shape with the form of a Super Ball in this season, and Jett Pet no longer goes with him
226	2	"Pelmeni Panic"	Russia & International Space Station	2021	2021
Jett flies to Russia to deliver cooking utensils to a girl named Sasha, who wants to go to the International Space Station to prepare Pelmenis, a kind of ravioli, for her father who works on board. Unfortunately, when a problem occurs in the station, it is necessary to count on the help of a new friend, Lime the Super Wings cook, to restore the menu to normal. Package item: A steam cooker for Sasha; Word of this episode: в восторге (v vostorge, being excited in Russian); Super Wings World Guardians helper: Lime and Astra; Super Ball Power used: Fire Power Note: Due to Russian invasion of Ukraine, This episode doesn't Broadcast in Ukraine
227	3	"The Animals Come to Town"	(Kenya) Nairobi	2021	2021
Joy is a young boy living in the township of Nairobi, he discovers that in the city, the animals of the national park have escaped and are walking around, including a baby lion named Kimba. He orders a tablet from Jett to bring the animals back to the park, but once they arrive, they find themselves facing Golden Boy and his new sidekick: Golden Wheels. Can Jett and Joy stop them before they cause more damage and get Kimba the lion cub back? Package item: A tactile tablet to communicate with animals for Joy; Word of this episode: Kamilii (Perfect in Swahili); Super Wings World Guardians helper: Paul; Super Ball Power used: Animal Power Note: At the start of this episode of this season, Golden Boy is showing teaming up with a new accomplice, Golden Wheels.
228	4	"Watermelon Winner"	(South Korea) Gwangju	2021	2021
Jeun-Yung and his father participate in the biggest watermelon contest organized by his village. To make the trip easier, Jett brings the young boy a giant slide that crosses the valley, except that things get complicated when the watermelon rolls faster and faster without stopping. Will Jett, Jeun-Yung, Rocky and Donnie, who has been called in to help, be able to stop the watermelon and save the contest? Package item: A giant slide for Jeun-Yung; Word of this episode: 이거 대박 (igeo daebag, "this is so cool" in Korean); Super Wings World Guardians helper: Donnie Super Ball Power used: Earth Power
229	5	"Turtle Tornado"	(Turkey) İztuzu Beach	2021	2021
Jett delivers a wheelbarrow to Sevgi, who wants to build a fence to protect turtle eggs during a storm near her home. But the eggs hatch anyway and the baby turtles are blown away by the storm. Package item: A wheelbarrow that carries turtles for Sevgi; Word of this episode: Git (can i go? in Turkish); Super Wings World Guardians helper: Donnie Super Ball Power used: Iron Power
230	6	"Operation Lemon Landing"	(France) Saint-Marguerite Island & Menton	2021	2021
Jett goes to deliver a giant inflatable boat for Emile, who wants to participate in the Lemon Festival in the city of Menton with his citrus robot. But during the sea crossing, the float falls into the water. It's time for the World Guardians and dragons to intervene to arrive in time for the parade. Package item: An inflatable boat for Emile; Word of this episode: S'il vous plaît (Please in French); Super Wings World Guardians helper: Donnie Super Ball Power used: Iron Power
231	7	"Pyramid Playtime"	(Egypt) Giza	2021	2021
Selma orders a giant rattle from Super Wings for her toddler Baba who became a giant after being photographed by Grand Albert's camera, who lost him while visiting the World Aircraft. Except that the giant baby starts chasing tourists in camels to the pyramids and risks destroying them. Jett, Selma and Donnie must quickly repair the damage and return Baba to his normal size. Package item: A giant rattle for Selma's little brother, Baba; Word of this episode: رائع ("rayie", woaw in Arabic); Super Wings World Guardians helper: Donnie and Grand Albert; Super Ball Power used: Iron Power Note: Grand Albert returns in this episode after his absence on Season 5 and his last appearance on the Season 4 episode "Mexican Meow Mission".
232	8	"Vroom Vroom Bubble Trouble"	(Canada) / (Alberta) Banff	2021	2021
Henry loves to play with the electric car his father built for him, but when it gets dirty and the town's car wash breaks down, Henry decides to order a wash kit. Jett brings it to him and together they wash all the cars that were getting impatient. Except something goes wrong when they try to clean a garbage truck, asking for help from the World Guardians. Package item: A car wash kit for Henry; Word of this episode: it git'er done (it's done in English Canadian); Super Wings World Guardians helper: Dizzy Super Ball Power used: Wind Power
233–234	9–10	"The Legendary Super Wing"	(Denmark) / Greenland	2021	2021
Jett is about to go on his 300th delivery mission, and he's excited because if he succeeds, he'll get into the Super Wings Hall of Fame. An order from Eric in Greenland leads him and the young boy to discover a dinosaur stuck in a giant iceberg. Unfortunately the intervention of Golden Boy and Golden Wheels risks injuring the creature. With the dinosaur freed, he gets rid of the golden duo and grabs Eric to take him to the mountains. Jett decides to call in the World Guardians to stop the dinosaur before it hurts Eric. Will Jett be able to complete his 300th mission and enter the Hall of Fame and find out who this dinosaur really is? Package item: A laser that melts ice for Eric; Word of this episode: Kutaa (Hello in Greenlandic); Super Wings World Guardians helper: Donnie, Dizzy, Paul, Astra, and World Aircraft as World Robot; Super Ball Power used: Wind, Lightning, Iron, Animal and Fire Power; Note: Jett becomes a legendary Super Wing at the start of this episode, entering the Hall of Fame after his 300th mission. Note 2: This is the first episode of the season in which World Aircraft turns into World Robot. Note 3: Also, this episode shows that Tino, a legendary Super Wing, is trapped in a giant block of ice, probably since the beginning of the series. Note 4: At the beginning of this episode, it shows Jett and Astra flying in from a mission without Super Pets so the 299th mission could be a Season 6 episode.
235	11	"Choo-Choo Through The Water"	Denmark	2021	2021
Jett delivers a repair kit for Laerke, who wants to fix an old locomotive, Lauge, that she found while playing hide and seek with her friends. With the locomotive repaired, the little group decides to go to the train museum with their parents, when a problem on the tracks prevents Lauge from continuing in the right direction. It's up to the Super Wings train Tony to intervene in a hurry. Word of this episode: Hurting (Quick, Fast in Danish); Super Wings World Guardians helper: Tony Super Ball Power used: Iron Power
236	12	"Golden Wishes"	Laos	2021	2021
It's the Pha That Luang festival and Niphavanh needs a basket of flowers in order to make a wish, which Jett takes care of. But when Niphavanh is about to make a wish, Golden Boy and Golden Wheels steal the golden monument and go into space. With the help of Astra and Izzy, they try to recover the Pha That Luang from the two thieves. Package item: A flower basket for Niphavanh; Word of this episode: None; Super Wings World Guardians helper: Astra Super Ball Power used: Lightning Power
237	13	"Super Wings' Super Sidekick"	(China) Shanghai & Hangzhou	2021	2021
Jett goes on a special mission to China, he is accompanied by Finley, a young boy from Wales who won a contest to deliver to Yen-Ching a camera for his cooking tutorial in a restaurant. Several problems prevent Jett and Finley from reaching her, they are helped by Tony who, as Train Express, will quickly send them to Yen-Ching; Package item: A camera for Yen-Ching; Word of this episode: 快点 ("Kuài diǎn", hurry up in Mandarin Chinese); Super Wings World Guardians helper: Tony; Super Ball Power used: Iron Power Note: This episode features Finley from Wales, a Super Wings fan who comes with Jett in a special mission, he's also based on a real person who wins a Super Wings contest organized by a UK Kids Channel
238	14	"Golden Delivery Disaster"	(Italy) Pisa, (Chile) Easter Island & Norway	2021	2021
After taking control of Astra's satellite, Golden Boy makes deliveries in Jett's place, in a very bad way that has the effect of disappointing the children. After Jett fixes Golden Boy's mess, he and the other Super Wings go to retrieve their satellite, but a space problem may complicate the task. Package item: An ice cream cake, a giant brush and a scarf for three children, first delivered by Golden Boy, later by Jett; Word of this episode: None; Super Wings World Guardians helper: Dizzy, Paul, Donnie, Astra, and World Robot; Super Ball Power used: Earth, Wind, Lightning, Animal and Fire Power, but they just being absorbed by the black hole Note: This is the second episode of the series in which Golden Boy is making deliveries in Jett's place after the episode "The Case of the Missing Town" in Season 5. Note 2: World Aircraft makes his second appearance as World Robot.
239	15	"Pass That Torch"	(Greece) Athens	2021	2021
It's the Junior Olympics in Athens, and on this occasion, Helen offers the Super Wings to participate in the torch relay to open the competition. The relay goes on without incident until Golden Boy and Golden Wheels get involved. Package item: A torch that does not extend for Helen; Word of this episode: Οδύσσεια ("Odýsseia", Odyssey in Greek); Super Wings World Guardians helper: Paul and Astra; Super Ball Power used: Animal Power Note: Like Grand Albert, Willie makes his first return in this episode since his last appearance in the episode "Happy New Year Adventure" of Season 4.
240	16	"White Elephant Rescue"	(Thailand) Chiang Mai	2021	2021
When Kulap's elephant sanctuary floods in Chiang Mai, Thailand, She orders elephant-sized life jackets and water wings so she can guide the elephants to safety. Complications arise when Cory, a baby elephant, is separated from the group and carried away by water currents. Jett already has his hands full with the other elephants and Kulap can't rescue Cory alone. Package item: Five life jackets and water wings for Cory and the elephants Word of this episode: ช้างเผือก ("Chang phueak", white elephants in Thai); Super Wings World Guardians helpers: Dizzy and Sparky Super Ball Power used: Water Power
241	17	"Measure of a Treasure"	(Jordan) Petra	2021	2021
Abu is going on the adventure of a lifetime! Exploring the excavations at Petra in Jordan with his archaeologist treasure-hunter Uncle. But there's a big problem: he forgot to bring along one of his prized toy robots. He never goes anywhere without at least one of them! But the Super Wings save the day! Package item: A transforming cube shaped robot for Abu; Word of this episode: كنز ("kinz", Treasure in Arabic); Super Wings World Guardians helper: Donnie Super Ball Power used: Earth Power
242	18	"Colossal Fossil Surprise"	(Morocco) Erfoud	2021	2021
Jett flies to Erfoud, Morocco, and delivers a fossil detector to a boy named Kamal. Kamal wants to find a rare fossil to complete his collection, but he's having a hard time spotting one. When the detector locates some strange shapes underground, Jett digs deep and he and Kamal find themselves in an underground lake with a live, ancient whale called a Basilosaurus! Package item: A fossil detector for Kamal; Word of this episode: TBA; Super Wings World Guardians helper: Tino Super Ball Power used: Animal Power
243	19	"Rubbish Recycling Rescue"	(Malaysia) Mantanani Island	2021	2021
Jett delivers recycling boxes to Zikri, a young boy who worries that the dirty beaches of Mantanani Island will stop his friend Duggy the manatee from visiting. Jett, Zikri and his Grandpa clear the sand but then discover an even bigger problem, an island of rubbish floating in the sea. Package item: Three recycling boxes for Zikri and his Grandpa; Word of this episode: Bersihkan (Clean up in Malay); Super Wings World Guardians helper: Donnie Super Ball Power used: Iron Power
244	20	"Missing Mona Lisa"	(France) Paris	2022	2022
Jet flies to Paris, France and delivers a telescope to a girl named Amélie. Amélie is at the very crowded Louvre Museum with her mom and needs the telescope to see the most famous work of art in the world: The Mona Lisa. Package item: A pair of binoculars for Amelie; Word of this episode: Je suis Desole (I'm sorry in French); Super Wings World Guardians helper: Astra Super Ball Power used: Technology Power
245	21	"Sporty Sea Lion Surprise"	(United States) / (California) San Francisco	2022	2022
A girl named Bella is looking forward playing basketball with her Dad as soon as he finishes his work unloading a cargo container of fruit from a ship docked at San Francisco's Pier 39. But playful sea lions cause the cargo container to spill all its fruit into the harbour. Package item: A net for Bella; Word of this episode: TBA; Super Wings World Guardians helper: Dizzy Super Ball Power used: Water Power
246	22	"The Marina Bay Monster"	Singapore	2022	2022
A boy named Riley is in Singapore visiting a friend, a girl named Lifen who is a local movie star. They want to make a monster movie with Riley directing and Lifen starring. Golden Boy is a huge fan of Lifen's and wants to be in the movie with her, so he makes himself mega-sized and he gets the monster role. Package item: TBA; Word of this episode: TBA; Super Wings World Guardians helper: Astra Super Ball Power used: TBA
247	23	"Puppy Patrol Partners"	(United Kingdom) / (England) Larkhill	2022	2022
Maggie wants to be a buddy-cop-duo with her pet Chihuahua, Kiki, and help people in need. So, Jet delivers police costumes for Maggie and Kiki and then joins them in patrolling the town. After a bit of a rough start, the patrol team finds a couple who needs help finding Stonehenge, the famous, ancient stone circle Package item: A police custom for Maggie; Word of this episode: TBA; Super Wings World Guardians helper: Paul Super Ball Power used: Polar Power
248	24	"Trouble in Tiny Town"	(Germany) Hamburg	2022	2022
Jett flies to Hamburg todeliver a pair of mini vacuum cleaners to help Lars and his Dad clean up a spillage of popcorn across their impressive model village. They run into problems, though, when they find difficulty reaching popcorn inside the village's train tunnel. Package item: A pair of mini vacuums for Lars and his dad Word of this episode: Sehr klein (Very Small in German); Super Wings World Guardians helper: Astra (to Minimize Jett Lars and his dad) Tony (To help with super Ball Power) Super Ball Power used: Iron Power
249	25	"Great Wall Express"	(China) Beijing	2022	2022
Peiru and her dad are hiking the Great Wall of China in Beijing. Heavy showfall has made the Great Wall difficult to traverse, so Peiru orders winter hiking gear to help their climb. Package item: A hiking gear for Peiru and her dad Word of this episode: TBA; Super Wings World Guardians helper: Tony Super Ball Power used: Polar Power
250	26	"Underwater Wheels"	(United States) / North Carolina	2022	2022
Dale wants to be in an underwater bike race with his dad, and help him win. So Jett delivers a tandem bicycle and agrees to join their team. Things take a turn when Golden Boy enters the race and sends them off-course. Their bike collides with Captain Wreck, a sunken pirate ship who's been fast asleep. She awakes and thinks they're stealing her treasure. Package item: A Shark bike with a belt for two Word of this episode: Landlover; Super Wings World Guardians helper: Dizzy Super Ball Power used: Water Power
251	27	"Sick Day Save"	(South Korea) Busan	2022	2022
A toddler in South Korea named Ha-Jun has a cold but doesn't like the taste of the medicine that his Dad needs to give him. Ha-Jun's sister Yuna calls the Super Wings for help and Jett brings a special jelly ball shaped like a plane filled with the medicine. Ha-Jun wants it now because he likes airplanes. Package item: A jellyball with medicine inside Word of this episode: TBA; Super Wings World Guardians helper: Astra Super Ball Power used: ???
252	28	"Arctic Fox Friends"	Iceland	2022	2022
A boy named Geir in Iceland goes with his Mom on a tour in a giant glacier bus to see arctic foxes in their natural habitat. Geir orders an arctic fox costume to wear so the shy foxes will come out of their caves and meet him. Package item: An Arctic Fox costume for Geir; Word of this episode: TBA; Super Wings World Guardians helper: Tino Super Ball Power used: TBA
253	29	"Mid-Air Mess Up"	(Germany) Pforzheim	2022	2022
Jett delivers a huge inflatable sword to Neela, an accessory for the balloon version of the legendary dragon-fighter Siegfried she is flying with her Papa in the annual balloon festival. Unfortunately, Golden Boy and Golden Wing are also attending, flying their inflatable, smoke billowing dragon balloon! Package item: an inflatable sword for Neela; Word of this episode: Held (Hero in German); Super Wings World Guardians helper: Dizzy Super Ball Power used: TBA
254	30	"Soccer with Stone Statues"	(Colombia) San Agustín	2022	2022
Fabio loves soccer but he is not interested in history. One day Fabio's Mom takes him to visit her workplace which is the famous San Agustín Archaeological Park. Fabio brings his ball, not expecting to have any fun from this tour. Then he accidentally drops his ball into one of sites with many ancient statues! Package item: TBA; Word of this episode: Amigo (Friend in Spanish); Super Wings World Guardians helper: Donnie Super Ball Power used: Earth Power, But This Power will Return Stone Statues to life
255	31	"World Robot vs Golden Robot Part 1"	Tuvalu & Antarctica	2022	2022
Golden Boy Unlocks golden cube in Antarctica to be a best World guardian, and Water floods Tuvalu, so Alani helps tuvalu Villagers to save. Package item: Save boat for Alani and villagers Word of this episode: Fetosami (Help me in Tuvaluan) TBA; Super Wings World Guardians helper: TBA in part 2 Super Ball Power used: TBA in part 2
256	32	"World Robot vs Golden Robot Part 2"	Antarctica	2022	2022
None; Package item: Same as part 1 Word of this episode: Same as part 1 Super Wings World Guardians helper: World Robot, Tony, Dizzy, Sparky and Tino Super Ball Power used: Fire, Iron, Animal and Water Power
257	33	"Volcano Lava Pizza"	(Italy) Naples and World Aircraft	2022	2022
TBA; Package item: A kitchen form for Mano; Word of this episode: Capocuoca (Chef in Italian); Super Wings World Guardians helper: Lime Super Ball Power used: Iron Power
258	34	"Fiji Camping Chaos"	Fiji	2022	2022
TBA; Package item: TBA; Word of this episode: TBA; Super Wings World Guardians helper: Donnie Super Ball Power used: Iron Power
259	35	"Hot Taco Trouble in Mexico"	Mexico City	2022	2022
TBA; Package item: A hot Sauce pistol for Diego; Word of this episode: TBA; Super Wings World Guardians helper: Lime Super Ball Power used: Fire Power
260	36	"Bibimbap Til Ya Drop"	(South Korea) Jeonju	2022	2022
TBA; Package item: TBA; Word of this episode: TBA; Super Wings World Guardians helper: Lime Super Ball Power used: TBA
261	37	"I Want to Meet the Moon Lady!"	(China) Shantou	2022	2022
TBA; Package item: TBA; Word of this episode: TBA; Super Wings World Guardians helper: Donnie Super Ball Power used: TBA
262	38	"Coloring The Cosmos Part 1"	(Belgium) Transinne	2022	2022
TBA; Package item: TBA; Word of this episode: TBA; Super Wings World Guardians helper: Astra, Rover and World robot Super Ball Power used: TBA
263	39	"Coloring The Cosmos Part 2"	Solar System	2022	2022
TBA; Package item: TBA; Word of this episode: TBA; Super Wings World Guardians helper: Astra, Rover and world robot Super Ball Power used: TBA
264	40	"Treasure Hunt in Peru"	(Peru) Rio Abiseo National Park	2022	2022
TBA; Package item: TBA; Word of this episode: Tesoro (Treasure in Spanish); Super Wings World Guardians helper: Paul Super Ball Power used: Animal Power

=== Season 7: Super Pet Adventures (2023) ===
No. overall	No. in season	Title	Location	Original release date	U.S. (Universal Kids) air date
265	1	"Panda Museum"	(China) Chengdu	2023	2023
Three pandas were out of a panda center. Super Wings helper: Dizzy
266	2	"Finding Fara's Family"	(Iceland) Heimaey	2023	2023
Jett and Paul try's to find Fara the Dolphin's home. Super Wings helper: Paul
267	3	"Royal Dog Training Class"	(Sweden) Stockholm	2023	2023
Jett and Donnie with princess visit royal dog training school. Super Wings helper: Donnie
268	4	"Birthday Bash"	Mexico City	2023	2023
Jett and Jerome go to birthday party. Super Wings helper: Jerome
269	5	"Cat Tower Catastrophe"	(Italy) Pisa	2023	2023
Jett and Shine go to clean up mess that cat made. Super Wings helper: Shine
270	6	"Robot Dance Competition"	(South Korea) Pohang	2023	2023
Jett and Jerome go to robot dance competition. Super Wings helper: Jerome
271	7	"Big Bird Bother"	(Tanzania) Serengeti National Park	2023	2023
Jett and Ellie goes to Serengeti National Park. Super Wings helper: Ellie
272	8	"Wild Waterslide with Hippos"	Kenya	2023	2023
Jett and Donnie go there to make slide-waters. Super Wings helper: Donnie
273	9	"Snow in the Sahara"	(Egypt) Sahara Desert	2023	2023
Jett and Astra go to Sahara desert. Super Wings helper: Astra
274	10	"A Magic Carpet Ride"	(Turkey) Istanbul	2023	2023
Jett and Ellie go to Istanbul. Super Wings helper: Ellie
275	11	"Himalayan Yeti Yikes"	(Nepal) Himalayas	2023	2023
Jett and Dizzy go to the Himalayas. Super Wings helper: Dizzy
276	12	"Space Birthday Party"	(Chile) Atacama Desert & Mars	2023	2023
Jett and Astra go to outer space. Super Wings helper: Astra
277	13	"Toy Factory Trouble"	(China) Shantou	2023	2023
Jett and Donnie go to a toy factory. Super Wings helper: Donnie
278	14	"Itchy Lion Rescue"	(South Africa) Cullinan	2023	2023
Jett and Astra go to a wildlife preserve. Super Wings helper: Astra
279	15	"Busan Video Game Arcade"	(South Korea) Busan	2023	2023
Jett and Ellie go to a video game arcade. Super Wings helper: Ellie
280	16	"Mighty Mammoth Sleigh"	(Russia) Yamal Peninsula	2023	2023
Jett and Dizzy go to Siberia. Super Wings helper: Dizzy
281	17	"Denmark Dinosaurs Part 1"	(Denmark) Copenhagen	2023	2023
Jett and Dizzy go to a natural history museum. Super Wings helper: Dizzy
282	18	"Denmark Dinosaurs Part 2"	(Denmark) Copenhagen	2023	2023
Jett and Dizzy go back in time. Super Wings helper: Dizzy, Tino
283	19	"Pet Hotel Panic"	(United Arab Emirates) Dubai	2023	2023
Jett and Paul go to a pet hotel. Super Wings helper: Paul
284	20	"Chasing the Comet"	(Namibia) Windhoek	2023	2023
Jett and Astra go to outer space. Super Wings helper: Astra, Shine, Marc
285	21	"Jett's Birthday Party"	World Aircraft, Democratic Republic of the Congo, (Italy) Venice & (Nepal) Himalayas	2023	2023
Jett goes to save the other Super Wings. Super Wings helper: Jett
286	22	"Super Wings Speed Squad"	(Italy) Monza	2023	2023
Jett, Dizzy, and Jerome go racing. Super Wings helper: Dizzy, Jerome
287	23	"Teeny Toy Takers"	(Thailand) Lopburi	2023	2023
Jett and Paul help a kid find his toy. Super Wings helper: Paul
288	24	"How to Train Your Spider"	(Spain) Madrid	2023	2023
Jett and Ellie go to a train station. Super Wings helper: Ellie
289	25	"Go Slow, Jett!"	(Malaysia) Kuala Lumpur	2023	2023
Jett eats a trick piece of chocolate that makes him slow. Super Wings helper: Donnie
290	26	"Blast from the Past"	(France) / (French Polynesia) Tahiti	2023	2023
Jett and Dizzy help stop the potential damage of an underwater volcano. Super Wings helper: Dizzy, Tino, Moza
291	27	"World Aircraft Tour Day (Paribu Cineverse)"	World Aircraft & (Hungary) Budapest	2023	2023
Jett and Dizzy have a mixed up delivery. Super Wings helper: Dizzy
292	28	"Paper Rangers are Back!"	(Japan) Tokyo	2023	2023
Jett and Donnie help the Paper Rangers with a movie. Super Wings helper: Donnie
293	29	"Spin to Win Tornado"	(Mexico) Pueblo	2023	2023
Jett and Astra help stop a tornado. Super Wings helper: Astra
294	30	"Trash Monster Madness"	(Brazil) Caldas Novas	2023	2023
Jett and Shine stop a trash monster. Super Wings helper: Shine, Marc
295	31	"The Wild Little Mermaid"	(Philippines) Cebu	2023	2023
Jett and Jerome go to a mermaid class. Super Wings helper: Jerome
296	32	"Time Travel Mayhem Part 1"	(France) Paris	2023	2023
Jett and Donnie help build an elevator at the Eiffel Tower. Super Wings helper: Donnie
297	33	"Time Travel Mayhem Part 2"	(France) Paris	2023	2023
Jett and Donnie go back in time to make the Eiffel Tower a success. Super Wings helper: Donnie
298	34	"Flying Fish Frenzy"	(Japan) Osaka	2023	2023
Jett and Dizzy help make a giant fish kite. Super Wings helper: Dizzy
299	35	"Giant Harvest Hero"	(South Korea) Jeju Island	2023	2023
Jett and Astra save an orange grove from a tornado. Note: this is a sequel to the episode 'The Jeju Giant'. Super Wings helper: Astra
300	36	"Machu Picchu Adventure"	(Peru) Machu Picchu	2023	2023
Jett and Ellie fall into a booby trap in Machu Picchu. Super Wings helper: Ellie
301	37	"Fastest Snail in the World"	(Vietnam) Ha Long	2023	2023
Jett and Astra have to catch a runaway snail on a skateboard. Super Wings helper: Astra
302	38	"Down the Ant Tunnel"	(Germany) Verrenberg	2023	2023
Jett and Astra have to find a bead down an ant tunnel. Super Wings helper: Astra
303	39	"Rock N'Roll Pinball"	(Portugal) Monsanto	2023	2023
Jett and Paul have to stop a boulder from breaking a house. Super Wings helper: Paul
304	40	"Aerial Octo-Fuss!"	(China) Weifang	2023	2023
Jett and Paul have to stop a giant kite. Super Wings helper: Paul

=== Season 8: Electric Heroes (2024) ===
No. overall	No. in season	Title	Location	Original release date	U.S. (Universal Kids) air date
305	1	"Rocket Rollercoaster"	(Germany) Württemberg	2024	2024
Jett and Marty go to a carnival in germany and Golden Boy's cousin Golden Girl joins him on his missions Super Wings helper: Marty
306	2	"Amazon Electric Adventure"	(Brazil) Amazon River	2024	2024
Jett and Dizzy go to the Amazon rainforest to bring Ria and her mother a motor for their boat but Golden Girl uses her Nano wand and gets a pineapple stuck to the tail of a jaguar Super Wings helper: Dizzy
307	3	"Robot Dog Romp"	Singapore	2024	2024
Jett and Lucie have to shrink a giant robotic dog. Super Wings helper: Lucie
308	4	"Big Bread Baguette Train"	(France) Paris	2024	2024
Jett and Marty help Nico carry the giant baguette to the school's baking festival. Super Wings helper: Marty
309	5	"Into the World of Dinosaurs"	(South Korea) Goseong	2024	2024
Jett and Traver go back in time to find the owner of a dinosaur footprint. Super Wings helper: Traver
310	6	"Vang Vieng Vroom Vroom"	(Laos) Vang Vieng	2024	2024
Jett and Dizzy deliver monster truck tires. Super Wings helper: Dizzy
311	7	"Stone Age Super Wings"	(United States) / (California) Los Angeles	2024	2024
Jett and Tino have to deliver mood lights to a boy in Los Angeles, but go fast that they end up in prehistoric Los Angeles. Super Wings helper: Tino
312	8	"The Sphinx Awakens!"	(Egypt) Cairo	2024	2024
Jett and Sally have to uncover the sphinx from underneath a sandstorm, but get into trouble when Golden Boy and Golden Girl appear. Super Wings helper: Sally
313	9	"Dragon Dance Battle"	(China) Sichuan	2024	2024
Jett, Tiki, and Taki travel to China's Sichuan province to deliver a pair of jumping shoes. Super Wings helper: Tiki and Taki
314	10	"Giant Jett!"	(Turkey) Antalya	2024	2024
Jett and Marty deliver sand castle-making tools to a girl on the beach, but meet Golden Boy and Golden Girl there. Super Wings helper: Marty
315	11	"The Amazing Hamster Race"	(United Kingdom) / (England) London	2024	2024
Jett and Tino travel to London, England, and give an obstacle track to Mark's pet hamsters. Super Wings helper: Tino
316	12	"The Himalayan Walking School"	(Nepal) Manang	2024	2024
Jett and Marty help a school get to its students during a heavy snowstorm. Super Wings helper: Marty
317	13	"Bloom on the Moon"	Moon	2024	2024
Jett and Dizzy travel to the moon to build a greenhouse to grow tulips in. Super Wings helper: Dizzy
318	14	"Super Wings Checkup Day"	World Airport	2024	2024
The Super Wings go for a health checkup, but Jett is covered in mud and it makes it harder to fly. Super Wings helper: All Super Wings Note : Jimbo was return as Trainer in World airport.
319	15	"Two Jetts Calamity"	(United Kingdom) / (Scotland) Aberdeen	2024	2024
Golden Boy and Golden Girl transform into Jett and Lucie and pretend to be Super Wings. Super Wings helper: Lucie
320	16	"Space Food Truck"	Moon	2024	2024
Jett, Tiki, Taki, and Rover deliver a set of cooking utensils to the base on the Moon. Super Wings helper: Tiki, Taki and Rover
321	17	"Dino-Riffic Day Out"	(Denmark) Copenhagen	2024	2024
Jett and Sally deliver a gift box to a boy who puts a robot dinosaur in it. Super Wings helper: Sally
322	18	"Brazil Blackout"	(Brazil) Foz do Iguaçu	2024	2024
Jett and Traver deliver a new TV so a girl can watch a soccer match with her dad. Super Wings helper: Traver
323	19	"Giant Dragonfly Danger"	(China) Hubei Sheng	2024	2024
Jett and Tino deliver a state-of-the-art dragonfly swatter. Super Wings helper: Tino
324	20	"Big Friendly Batsman"	(Nepal) Gatlang	2024	2024
Jett, Tiki, and Taki deliver a folding net for a cricket match. Super Wings helper: Tiki and Taki
325	21	"Battle of the Builders"	World Airport	2024	2024
World Spaceport collides with a meteor and the engine is destroyed! World Spaceport will have to make an emergency landing at World Airport to make repairs. Jett and Marty rush to World Airport to build a landing pad. Super Wings helper: Marty
326	22	"Frozen Fest Frenzy"	(China) Harbin	2024	2024
Jett and Marty deliver a hand warmer to a girl during the Chinese Ice Lantern Festival. Super Wings helper: Marty
327	23	"New Year's Eve Around the World Part 1"	Moldova, (Brazil) Rio de Janeiro & (United States) / (New York (state)) New York City	2024	2024
On New Year's Eve, Jett sets out with Tiki and Taki to deliver to children around the world. Super Wings helper: Tiki and Taki Note: This is the first time the Super Wings have visited a new country (Moldova) since S6 E31 (Tuvalu).
328	24	"New Year's Eve Around the World Part 2"	(United States) / (New York (state)) New York City	2024	2024
Traver rushes out to save Jett from falling with a crystal ball. However, when the energy of Traver's clock and Golden Girl's wand mix, a wormhole is formed, and Jett, Traver, Golden Boy, Golden Girl, and Layla travel dimensions with the ball. Super Wings helper: Traver
329	25	"Medieval Knight Adventure"	(Spain) Consuegra	2024	2024
Jett and Traver deliver knight armor to help a boy defeat a dragon. Super Wings helper: Traver
330	26	"Northern Magnetic Mayhem"	(Iceland) Thingvellir National Park	2024	2024
Jett and Lucie deliver a huge fur hat to a shivering camping car named Viktor. Super Wings helper: Lucie
331	27	"Fantastic First Flight"	(United Kingdom) / Gibraltar & (Switzerland) Alps	2024	2024
Jett and Lucie help the Super Band get to a concert. Super Wings helper: Lucie
332	28	"Alice in Pixel-Land"	Pixel-Land	2024	2024
Jett, Tiki and Taki visit a video game. Super Wings helper: Tiki and Taki
333	29	"Super Space Scout Adventure Part 1"	World Spaceport	2024	2024
the Super Space Scouts, visit World Spaceport for a fun, zero-gravity tour. When they join a mission to deliver a giant Super Wing ball to Mars, it breaks free during an asteroid dodge. Jett, Dizzy, and Mason retrieve it, but Golden Boy and Golden Girl intervene. During the struggle, the ball and everyone get sucked into a black hole, setting up an unexpected adventure! Super Wings helper: All Super Wings
334	30	"Super Space Scout Adventure Part 2"	World Spaceport, Jupiter, Iceland, (United States) / Hawaii, (United Kingdom) / (England) London & Mars	2024	2024
The Super Wings protect the Earth from one of Jupiter's moons.. Super Wings helper: All Super Wings
335	31	"Metatron the City Guardian"	(Japan) Fukuoka	2024	2024
Jett and Tino fix a broken robot. Super Wings helper: Tino
336	32	"The Longest Train in the World!"	(United States) / Wyoming	2024	2024
Jett and Marty visit Wyoming. Super Wings helper: Marty
337	33	"Hang Gliding With Pterosaurs"	(Australia) Wollongong	2024	2024
Traver accidentally sends Jett and Sally back in time. Super Wings helper: Traver and Sally
338	34	"The Epic Role Swap Mission"	(Canada) / Alberta	2024	2024
Jett swaps places with Sky and Storm. Super Wings helper: Jett and Dizzy
339	35	"The Epic Dino-lympics"	(Morocco) Erfoud	2024	2024
Jett, Traver, Sally and Tino create a dinosaur competition. Super Wings helper: Traver, Sally and Tino
340	36	"Babysitting Baby Nessies"	(United Kingdom) / (Scotland) Loch Ness	2024	2024
Jett and Dizzy take care of baby Loch Ness Monsters. Super Wings helper: Dizzy
341	37	"Guardians of the Sea"	Pacific Ocean	2024	2024
Jett, Lucy, Mira, Swampy and Willie heal injured animals. Super Wings helper: Lucy, Mira, Swampy and Willie
342	38	"Construction Crane Chaos"	(Germany) Munich	2024	2024
Jett and Marty save a car factory. Super Wings helper: Marty
343	39	"Melbourne Tennis Madness"	(Australia) Melbourne	2024	2024
Jett and Dizzy deliver a tennis machine. Super Wings helper: Dizzy
344	40	"Voyager's Gold Record"	Unidentified Planet & (United States) / California	2024	2024
Jett and Lucy discover an unidentified planet. Super Wings helper: Lucy

=== Season 9: Super Combo (2024–25) ===
No. overall	No. in season	Title	Location	Original release date	U.S. (Universal Kids) air date
345	1	"Dino Egg Hunt Hoopla"	(Romania) Bucharest	28 November 2024	TBA
Jett and Dizzy go to Bucharest, Romania, to deliver a 'super detection hammer' to Camilla, a girl who is competing in a competition to find hidden dinosaur eggs. Camilla finds a large egg, but Golden Boy and Golden Girl steal the egg. Upon stealing the egg, a group of angry block dinosaurs chase them, causing chaos in the park. Eventually, Jett and Dizzy get the egg back, but the block dinosaurs stack on top of each other, creating a block dinosaur tower which threatens Jett and Dizzy. In the end, Jett and Dizzy knock the tower down and Camilla wins the egg, which hatches into a block dinosaur. Package item: A super detection hammer for Camilla; Word of this episode: Salut (Hello) in Romanian Super Wings helper: Dizzy
346	2	"Tanghulu Tangle Trouble"	(China) Heilongjiang Province	28 November 2024	TBA
Jett, Tiki and Taki go to Daqing City, China, to deliver an inflatable doll to Xiangxiang, which will hopefully attract customers to her father's Tanghulu shop that lacks customers due to its remote location. The shop attracts many new customers, including Golden Boy and Golden Girl. Golden Girl uses her Nana Wand to supersize one of the skewers, but when applying syrup, Tiki and Taki spill it upon fighting over applying the syrup, creating a sticky tower with the Super Wings, Golden Boy and Golden Girl. When the inflatable doll knocks the tower down, it rolls down a road, adding two cars. In the end, the Super Wings free the tower, and Xiangxiang gives Golden Girl another skewer. Package item: An inflatable doll for Xiangxiang; Word of this episode: 你好 ("Ní hăo"; Hello) in Mandarin Chinese Super Wings helper: Tiki and Taki
347	3	"Jett Meets the New Dino Wings"	Dino World	28 November 2024	TBA
The Dino Wings' mission commences in the Dino World, where they have to rescue various dinosaurs after an earthquake has taken place. Tino and Trico rescue three baby dinosaurs, while the Dino Wings' base falls into a fault with Vivo and his mother inside. There, Jett arrives in the Dino World, delivering a heavy-duty rescue crane to Tino. While activating this crane, Tino successfully rescues the base, as the Dino Wings take care of the baby dinosaurs before being interrupted by an alarm of another earthquake. They rush to the rescue, where a stubborn T-rex, the babies' mother, falls into a fault. In the end, they rescue the T-rex, returning the babies to their mother. Package item: A heavy-duty rescue crane for Tino Dino Wings helpers: Dino Wings (Tino, Sally, Brachy, Trico and Stego)
348	4	"Jurassic Joy Dino Farm"	Dino World	28 November 2024	TBA
While Noah and the Dino Wings patrol, hail turns out to be seeds from a giant fruit eaten by a Jeholornis. To save the tree species, they plant a fruit farm! Jett brings farming gear, but a rock causes flooding that threatens the seeds. The team digs a ditch to divert water. Traver speeds up time, and the trees grow fast, feeding dinos and friends! Package item: TBA Dino Wings helpers: Dino Wings (Tino, Sally, Brachy, Trico and Stego)
349	5	"Flame Fighting Friends"	(Australia) New South Wales	29 November 2024	TBA
Jett and Dizzy go to New South Wales, Australia, to deliver an animal stroller to Hazel, who wants to send a naughty baby wombat, that digs holes everywhere in her garden, back to the forest. They successfully attract the wombat into the stroller, but when sending it back to the forest, they strangely spot many animals in town following them, attracted to the stroller. Some animals tightly fit into the stroller, but many are unable to, so Jett and Dizzy connect more trolleys into a train. When they arrive at the forest, they spot a forest fire. Package item: An animal stroller for Hazel; Word of this episode: G'day (Hello) in Australian English Super Wings helper: Dizzy and Runi
350	6	"Super Wingless"	(United States) / (Washington, D.C.) Washington, D.C.	29 November 2024	TBA
Jett brings Braden a Wright Flyer model, but it crashes. Curious about the real flight, they time-travel with Traver to meet the Wright brothers. Arriving before planes exist, the SWs lose their wings! When the brothers almost give up, Braden and the SWs inspire them to keep going. At last, the Wright Flyer soars, making history! Package item: A model of the Wright brothers first airplane Word of this episode: TBA Super Wings helper: Traver
351	7	"Dino Mama Drama"	Dino World	30 November 2024	TBA
Noah and his Mom wear dino costumes to watch shy maiasauras up close. Suddenly, a huge gigantosaurus arrives, causing chaos! Noah escapes with a baby dino, mistaking it for Mom. Meanwhile, the mama dino takes Mom, thinking she's her baby! The Dino Wings help reunite Noah and the baby with their real moms. Mission complete! Package item: dino costumes Dino Wings helpers: Dino Wings (Tino, Sally, Brachy, Trico and Stego)
352	8	"The Ultimate Bug Battle"	(South Korea) Seoul	30 November 2024	TBA
Jett and Curie deliver superfoods to Lee Jun in Seoul so his tiny ant, Antny, can join "The Strongest Bug Contest." Curie's Super Jelly makes Antny huge, but rival beetles eat too much and become giant, battling across the city! Trapped, Jett calls for help. Antny saves them, and upgraded Super Wings stop the chaos. Package item: TBA; Word of this episode: TBA Super Wings helper: Curie
353	9	"Firefighters vs. Police"	(Vietnam) Hai Phong City	1 December 2024	TBA
Jett, Lucie, and Runi deliver firefighter helmets and police vests to Binh's school in Vietnam. Lucie and Runi compete to see who's cooler when a fire breaks out at a toy factory! Runi fights flames, Lucie secures the area, and Jett rescues a forklift warning toys are trapped. Package item: TBA; Word of this episode: TBA Super Wings helpers: Runi and Lucie
354	10	"Inside a Dinosaur"	Dino World	1 December 2024	TBA
Noah and the Dino Wings measure a Supersaurus, making Tino jealous. Golden Boy, hiding under a leaf, gets swallowed! With Jett's X-ray help, the Dino Wings shrink and enter the Supersaurus's stomach to rescue him. Tino overcomes jealousy, leads the team, and saves Golden Boy. Super Wings, we deliver! Package item: TBA; Super Wings helpers: Jett and Golden Girl Dino Wings helpers: Dino Wings (Tino, Sally, Brachy, Trico and Stego)
355–356	11–12	"Stop the Space Monster"	World Airport	2 December 2024	TBA
The Super Wings are attending Jimbo's retirement party. Someone needs to guard the planet from World Spaceport and Jett draws the short straw - actually the red straw. While the Super Wings in World Spaceport and those on the ground get invitations to Jimbo's party and go to attend, Jett responsibly stays on guard. However, from the mist of space, a giant rock seeing the party invitation - left by Astra - goes towards Earth with intentions unknown for Jimbo's party. Jett tries to stop it, but the rock breaks through with the Super Wings all joining forces to try to stop it. Then, a giant space rock attempts to crash the party and faces the Super Wings. It acts like a Super Wing with eyes, rocket boosters, and the ability to transform. World Space Robot goes to World Airport to try to stop it and all the Super Wings help, but they fail. Jimbo bravely decides to try to stop it, too. He shoots a laser canon at it and the rock of the giant robot starts to crumble. Surprisingly, Jimbo stops as he recognizes an old Super Wing. He wasn't there to crash the party, he was there to stop Jimbo from retiring. Package item: Invitations for Jimbo; Word of this episode: Unknown Super Wings helpers: All Super Wings
357	13	"The Great Flood in Dino World"	Dino World	3 December 2024	TBA
Heavy rain floods Dino World! Trico hides his fear of thunder as the Dino Wings rescue dinos to Dino Base, but it's too small. Jett brings paper from the SWs ball; they fold a boat that capsizes, then turn it into a paper plane! Facing a storm, they build a lightning rod. Trico overcomes his fear, guiding them to safety. Dinosaurs are saved! Package item: A giant sheet of paper Dino Wings helpers: Dino Wings (Tino, Sally, Brachy, Trico and Stego)
358	14	"Roy the Space Train"	Mars	3 December 2024	TBA
Jett and Marty bring a Smart Pad to Jinga on a Mars tour ship. Roy rushes to deliver missing bags but gets distracted with Sid the satellite and loses them on Halley's Comet! Jett and Marty call for Super Electric Pods, get upgraded, and save the bags. Back on Mars, Jinga, now a Mars expert, proudly leads the tour. Package item: A smart pad with facts about Mars; Word of this episode: TBA Super Wings helpers: Marty and Roy
359	15	"Invisible Trouble"	(Italy) Sicily	4 December 2024	TBA
In Sicily, Jett and Curie bring Renata a giant volcano kit to learn about eruptions. But Golden Boy and Golden Girl prank them with invisibility potion, making the fake volcano go wild! Fake lava floods the village. Using Curie's snow launcher, Jett and Curie stop the chaos. Renata thanks them and learns about volcanoes. Super Wings, we deliver! Package item: a giant volcano kit Word of this episode: TBA Super Wings helper: Curie
360	16	"World's Biggest Bath Challenge"	World Airport and (Japan) Hokkaido	4 December 2024	TBA
Jett and Marty bring cleaning supplies to Windy to wash Maxy, a huge plane covered in ash. Maxy dreams of a hot spring bath, so Jett flies her to Oyunuma Pond in Japan. Startled by snow monkeys, Maxy triggers geysers! Jett calls for help; upgraded, the Super Wings stop the geysers and save Maxy from falling. Package item: giant cleaning supplies Word of this episode: TBA Super Wings helper: Marty
361	17	"Dino Egg Delivery Mission"	Dino World	5 December 2024	TBA
The Dino Wings find cracked pterosaur eggs in a gorge. While climbing to return them, a bag snags, eggs bounce, and a baby hatches unnoticed. The baby sneaks into Dinobase, triggering it to transform into Dino-bot, shaking the gorge! DWs stop Dino-bot, save the nests, and reunite the baby with its mom. The Quetzalcoatlus king thanks them! Package item: a bag for carrying dinosaur eggs Dino Wings helpers: Dino Wings (Tino, Sally, Brachy, Trico and Stego)
362	18	"Finding Fennec Foxes"	(Libya) Sahara Desert	5 December 2024	TBA
Jett and Lucie deliver goggles to Latu and his dad in the Sahara, guided by Zabar the jeep to spot fennec foxes. A sandstorm hits, and Jett calls for help. The Super Wings get robot upgrades from charging pods but sink into a dune, landing in a hidden fox burrow! Safe after the storm, they meet many foxes. Latu, Dad, and Zabar see more fennec foxes than they ever hoped. Package item: desert goggles Word of this episode: TBA Super Wings helper: Lucie
363	19	"Jeju Giant’s Deep Dive Odyssey"	(South Korea) Jeju Island	6 December 2024	TBA
Jett and Dizzy bring diving gear to Taehoon on Jeju Island to help his robot aid his injured grandma in shellfish diving. A giant fish steals their catch! Upgraded, they chase it but it gets trapped in a net. Taehoon's robot frees it, but they're hauled onto a fishing boat. The fish returns the shellfish, and grandma feels proud. Package item: robot diving gear Word of this episode: TBA Super Wings helper: Dizzy
364	20	"Delivery From the Future"	World Spaceport	6 December 2024	TBA
Jett finds a strange delivery ball that releases five cubes, which turn into a giant junk robot aboard Ned, the recycling ship! Storm reveals the cubes power new Super Electric Suits. Jett and Marty get upgraded, transform into huge robots, and defeat the junk robot to save Ned. Package item: Unknown; Word of this episode: TBA Super Wings helper: Marty
365	21	"Underground Ball Bandits"	France	TBA	TBA
In Paris, Jett and Curie bring Raphael a croquet ball with a tracker. The ball vanishes into a mole hole! Shrunk by Curie's micro-gummy, they find moles took it to escape loud croquet sounds. A broken pipe floods the tunnel, but Jett saves the moles. After fixing the pipe, they move the croquet court away, letting everyone play in peace! Package item: Special items for Raphael; Word of this episode: TBA Super Wings helper: Curie
366	22	"Moon Dust Busters"	Moon	TBA	TBA
On the moon, Jett and Curie bring Kajsa a bike that won't float away. She enjoys riding until Rover flips and kicks up a huge dust cloud. Jett's attempt to clear it causes a storm, risking a spacecraft! Upgraded, the SWs save the ship. Curie uses science to stop the storm, then they activate Super Combo mode to protect the moon. Super Wings, we deliver! Package item: A bicycle for Kashia; Word of this episode: TBA Super Wings helper: Curie
367	23	"Jolly Madagascar Jungle Adventure"	Madagascar	TBA	TBA
Eddie's dad worries he only reads comics, so he sends Eddie to find a legendary elephant bird feather. SWs deliver a comic about the bird to help! In Madagascar's Tsingy forest, Dad secretly follows and accidentally causes chaos by climbing on the bird. When they almost fall into a canyon, SWs in car-mode robot suits save them. Package item: An elephant bird comic book for Eddie; Word of this episode: TBA Super Wings helper: Dizzy
368	24	"Red Riding Hood and the Golden Wolf"	(Germany) Munich	TBA	TBA
Jett and Marty bring a basket for Mila's giant Red Riding Hood puppet. Golden Boy and Girl appear in a wolf costume, scaring everyone! Upgraded into robot mode, the SWs stop the wolf and reveal the pranksters. The siblings fall into the river but are rescued by the SWs' Super Combo mode. The parade continues! Package item: A giant basket for Mila's Little Red Hood; Word of this episode: TBA Super Wings helper: Marty
369	25	"Fireworks Frenzy"	Singapore	TBA	TBA
Lien and Happy had 2 new robot dogs named Coco and Max. Jett and Traver help Lien with her rowdy robot dogs at a fireworks fest. Golden Siblings drop a nano wand, making giant fireworks! Traver freezes time; Jett calls for pods. Lien commands her dogs to help, while Jett and Traver cross-combine and fly the giant firework into space, saving the crowd and creating a stunning show! Package item: A special stroller for Lyu's robot dogs Word of this episode: TBA Super Wings helper: Traver
370	26	"The Kings of the Ocean"	Pacific Ocean	TBA	TBA
Jett and Dizzy return to Amara and her father's marine base. Package item: a fish cookie shaped like a champion belt Word of this episode: TBA Super Wings helper: Dizzy
371	27	"Princess Maribel's Castle Warning Party"	(United Kingdom) / England	TBA	TBA
Jett and Sara bring instructions for Princess Maribel's dollhouse-style castle party. Golden Boy sneaks in and hits buttons, causing chaos with flying dresses and desserts! Golden Girl's magic turns the castle pink, adding to the mess. Jett and Sara power up, team with Maribel, and restore order. Party saved! Package item: A manual book for Princess Maribel; Word of this episode: TBA Super Wings helper: Sara
372	28	"Run, Reindeer! Run!"	(Norway) Oslo	TBA	TBA
Jett and Sara deliver a reindeer headband to Princess Hedda in Norway for her dog Henrik in a sleigh race. A yarn challenge turns messy when sneezes send giant yarn snowballs downhill! Jett calls for power pods, and the SWs combine into Robot Suits to stop the snowballs and save the race. Hedda and Henrik finish safely. Package item: A reindeer headband for Princess Hedden's puppy, Henrik; Word of this episode: TBA Super Wings helper: Sara
373	29	"The Little Pirate King of the Caribbean"	Caribbean Sea	TBA	TBA
On a Caribbean cruise, Nako spots a pirate hat! Super Wings deliver a telescope, and soon a real pirate ship attacks. Nako leads the Super Wings to stop them, but the pirate ship starts sinking! Traver freezes time to save the captain. All ends well, and Nako is crowned little pirate king before Traver returns the pirates to the past! Package item: A telescope for Nako; Word of this episode: TBA Super Wings helper: Traver, Tiki & Taki
374	30	"Monster Truck Desert Derby"	(Mexico) Baja Desert	TBA	TBA
Jett and Marty travel to a monster truck race to replace Big Wheel's worn-out tires. Package item: Monster truck tires for Big Wheel; Word of this episode: TBA Super Wings helper: Marty
375–376	31–32	"Mission Team Titans"	World Airport	TBA	TBA
While repairing Dinobase in Copenhagen, dinos sneak through Noah's portal! Jett and Lucie help a brachiosaur stuck in a bin, but more dinos appear. Upgraded, they try to guide them back. Noah and DWs finish repairs and transform Dinobase into Dinobot to help return the dinos. Jett, Lucie, and Dinobot herd dinos back through portals, but new portals open worldwide! The Super Wings handle escapes in Paris, Amazon, Serengeti, and Tokyo. A final giant portal in Antarctica releases them all! World Airport and Spaceport transform into megabots to help. Together, they save the day and return dinos home! Package item: TBA; Word of this episode: TBA Super Wings helper: Lucie, World Robot and Dino Wings
377	33	"Kung Fu Kid"	(China) Songshan	TBA	TBA
Xinyan feels sad she can't win at Kung Fu. Jett and Traver take her back to train with a master, but she only learns chopstick moves. Sent to get a special fruit, she uses chopsticks to dodge a giant tiger and removes a thorn from its mouth. Back home, she wins her sparring match with her new chopstick Kung Fu! Package item: TBA; Word of this episode: TBA Super Wings helper: Traver
378	34	"Story of Jimbo's Wedding"	World Airport	TBA	TBA
At Jimbo's wedding, Jett and Sara deliver the rings and Windy is the ring bearer. Golden Girl makes a dropped ring huge, sending it rolling! The Super Wings chase it until Big Wing catches it-and reveals Jimbo's bride as his pilot! The wedding continues with cheers. Package item: a wedding ring Word of this episode: TBA Super Wings helper: Sara and Every Super Wing
379	35	"Dino Plant Rampage"	(China) Guangxi Province	TBA	TBA
Plant expert Daming revives a giant dino-era carnivorous plant with help from Jett and Runi. Golden Girl gets eaten and accidentally brings it to life! It escapes, then swallows Runi too. Jett and Golden Boy use cross combo power to stop it and save them both Package item: TBA; Word of this episode: TBA Super Wings helper: Runi and Golden Boy
380	36	"Bermuda Triangle Mystery"	Bermuda	TBA	TBA
Jett and Runi deliver a tent to Kyle and his dad on a Bermuda Triangle island but crash when their boosters fail. They find a junk monster emitting waves that cause the malfunction! By sorting the junk and cleaning the island, they fix the problem. Kyle and his dad enjoy a clean island. Package item: TBA; Word of this episode: TBA Super Wings helper: Runi
381	37	"The Fearless Elephant Force"	(Thailand) Chiang Mai	TBA	TBA
In Chiang Mai, Jett and Runi deliver tires to help Kulap coax shy baby elephant Paya out for a TV shoot. But Paya's cake causes a fire, and she flees! The Super Wings and elephant fire brigade save Paya and her mom. Kulap bonds with Paya, and the crew films a great story! Package item: TBA; Word of this episode: TBA Super Wings helper: Runi
382	38	"Monster Catch Match!"	(United States) / (New York City) New York	TBA	TBA
In New York City, Joseph gets AR goggles from Jett and Curie to play Monster Catch. Chasing a Griffin to Times Square, they clash with the Golden Siblings. A magic mishap releases monsters into the city! Joseph, Super Wings, and the siblings team up to catch them all. After catching the Griffin, Joseph learns playing with friends is the most fun! Package item: AR goggles to catch monsters Word of this episode: TBA Super Wings helper: Curie
383	39	"Wand-erful Magic Festival"	(Japan) Tokyo	TBA	TBA
Yuto wants to join the Magic Wand Festival with his sister Yui but has no wand. The Super Wings deliver one, and Yuto joins in. Yui finds Golden Girl's lost nano wand and brings a dragon to life! Yuto and the Super Wings save her by stopping the dragon. Yuto is named best wizard, proving himself to Yui Package item: TBA; Word of this episode: TBA Super Wings helper: Sara
384	40	"Rainbow Rock Hunt"	Mars	TBA	TBA
On Mars, A girl named Sam hunts rainbow stones with her dog Buddy and rover Vo. They find red, orange, indigo, and violet, but still need yellow, green, and blue. Vo finds blue and green but loses them to Marty and Buddy. Vo then drills up a yellow stone, waking a volcano! Buddy saves Vo; Super Wings stop the eruption. Vo gifts Sam the yellow stone, completing her set! Package item: TBA; Word of this episode: TBA Super Wings helper: Marty

=== Season 10: Save the World (2025–26) ===
No. overall	No. in season	Title	Location	Original release date	U.S. (Universal Kids) air date
377–378	1–2	"The Delivery King"	China	6 December 2025 & 7 December 2025	TBA
When Golden Boy gets super powers, he challenges Jett to a race to see who the fastest airplane is. Package item: Bamboo steamer for pandas and people. Super Wings helper: Max
379	3	"The Yeti Heroes of the Snowy Mountains"	(Nepal) Himalayas	18 April 2026	TBA
TBD; Package item: TBD Super Wings helpers: Dizzy
380	4	"V-Tront Rises Again"	(Japan) Fukuoka	9 December 2025	TBA
TBD; Package item: TBD Super Wings helpers: Dizzy, Donnie and Max
381	5	"The Trevi Fountain Coin Mystery"	(Italy) Rome	10 December 2025	TBA
TBD; Package item: TBD; Word of this episode: TBD Super Wings helper: Dizzy, Paul and Max
382	6	"Super Insects Rescue Squad"	Brazil	TBA	TBA
TBD; Package item: TBD; Word of this episode: TBD Super Wings helper: Dizzy, Bucky and Max
383	7	"Egyptian Prince and Pyramid Adventure Part 1"	Egypt	12 December 2025	TBA
TBD mini deep fryer: TBD Super Wings helpers: Dizzy, Bucky and Max
384	8	"Egyptian Prince and Pyramid Adventure Part 2"	Egypt	13 December 2025	TBA
Just when Jett, Dizzy, Bucky and Max get out of deep trouble, Golden Boy gets cursed by an ancient jewel and they have to help. Package item: TBA; Word of this episode: TBA Super Wings helper: Dizzy, Bucky
385	9	"Break the Ice, Save the Nessies!"	(United Kingdom) Thames	14 December 2025	TBA
TBD; Package item: Word of this episode: TBD Super Wings helpers:
386	10	"Snap's Super Cool Camera"	(France) Paris	21 February 2026	TBA
TBD; Package item: shaved ice maker /> Super Wings helpers: Dizzy, Snap and Max
387	11	"Paul's Spooky Mission Part 1"	Romania	21 February 2026	TBA
TBD; Package item: TBD Super Wings helpers: Dizzy, Paul and Max
388	12	"Paul's Spooky Mission Part 2"	Romania	17 December 2025	TBA
TBD; Package item: None Super Wings helpers: Dizzy, Paul and Max
389	13	"Clock Tower's Mysterious Light Part 1"	(Germany) Munich	17 December 2025	TBA
TBD; Package item: None Super Wings helpers: Dizzy, Runi and Max
390	14	"Clock Tower's Mysterious Light Part 2"	(Germany) Munich	TBA	TBA
TBD; Package item: TBD; Word of this episode: TBD Super Wings helper: Dizzy, Runi and Max
391	15	"Wake Up Jett from the Dream"	World Spaceport	TBA	TBA
TBD; Package item: TBD; Word of this episode: TBD Super Wings helper: Dizzy and Curie
392	16	"Where's Max?"	World Spaceport	TBA	TBA
TBD; Package item: TBD; Word of this episode: TBD Super Wings helper: Jett, Dizzy and Astra
393	17	"Friendship Beats a Tornado!"	Netherlands	TBA	TBA
TBD; Package item: TBD; Word of this episode: TBD Super Wings helper: Dizzy and Max
394	18	"My Name Is Super Roy! Part 1"	World Airport	TBA	TBA
TBD; Package item: TBD; Word of this episode: TBD Super Wings helper: Dizzy and Max
395	19	"My Name Is Super Roy! Part 2"	World Airport	TBA	TBA
TBD; Package item: TBD; Word of this episode: TBD Super Wings helper: Dizzy and Max
396	20	"Unsealed! Solar of Atlantis"	TBD	TBA	TBA
TBD; Package item: TBD; Word of this episode: TBD Super Wings helper: Dizzy, Solar and Max
397	21	"Earth's Mightiest Machines Part 1"	TBD	TBA	TBA
TBD; Package item: TBD; Word of this episode: TBD Super Wings helper: Dizzy, Donnie and Max
398	22	"Earth's Mightiest Machines Part 2"	TBD	TBA	TBA
TBD; Package item: TBD; Word of this episode: TBD Super Wings helper: Donnie and Max
399	23	"Quokka Kaboom!"	Australia	TBA	TBA
TBD; Package item: TBD; Word of this episode: TBD Super Wings helper: Dizzy, Snap and Max
400	24	"Go Super Puppy Happy"	Singapore	TBA	TBA
TBD; Package item: TBD; Word of this episode: TBD Super Wings helper: Dizzy, Paul, Snap and Max
401	25	"The Missing Golden Crown"	(France) Paris	TBA	TBA
TBD; Package item: TBD; Word of this episode: TBD Super Wings helper: Dizzy, Grand Albert and Max
402	26	"Roy Falls Into Dino World"	Dino World	TBA	TBA
TBD; Package item: TBD; Word of this episode: TBD Super Wings helper: Jett, Dizzy, Sally and Trico
403	27	"A T-Rex Swallowed the Star Core!"	Dino World	TBA	TBA
TBD; Package item: TBD; Word of this episode: TBD Super Wings helper: Jett, Dizzy, Tino and Stego
404	28	"A Special Meal for the Baby Dinosaurs"	Dino World	TBA	TBA
TBD; Package item: TBD; Word of this episode: TBD Super Wings helper: Dizzy, Trico, and Brachy
405	29	"Dino Sitting Day!"	Dino World	TBA	TBA
TBD; Package item: TBD; Word of this episode: TBD Super Wings helper: Dizzy and Rattie
406	30	"The Rainbow Wings Strike!"	Dino World	TBA	TBA
TBD; Package item: TBD; Word of this episode: TBD Super Wings helper: Dizzy, Tino and Sally
407	31	"Sharky, Guardian of the Sea"	Dino World	TBA	TBA
TBD; Package item: TBD; Word of this episode: TBD Super Wings helper: Dizzy, Tino, Sally, Sharky, and the rest of the Dino Wings
408	32	"Protect the Dinosaur World!"	Dino World	TBA	TBA
TBD; Package item: TBD; Word of this episode: TBD Super Wings helper: Dizzy, Sharky, Rattie, Tino, Stego, Sally, Trico and Brachy
409	33	"Golden Boy's Dangerous Delivery Part 1"	(Brazil) Amazon River	TBA	TBA
TBD; Package item: TBD; Word of this episode: TBD Super Wings helper: Dizzy and Max
410	34	"Golden Boy's Dangerous Delivery Part 2"	(Brazil) Amazon River	TBA	TBA
TBD; Package item: TBD; Word of this episode: TBD Super Wings helper: Dizzy and Max
411	35	"The Giant Kimbap Commotion!"	(South Korea) Seoul	TBA	TBA
TBD; Package item: TBD; Word of this episode: TBD Super Wings helper: Dizzy and Max
412	36	"Roy is Back!"	World Airport	TBA	TBA
TBD; Package item: TBD; Word of this episode: TBD Super Wings helper: Donnie and Max
413	37	"Jett and Golden Boy Team Up!"	Kenya	TBA	TBA
TBD; Package item: TBD; Word of this episode: TBD Super Wings helper: Paul and Max
414	38	"Golden Boy Becomes a Super Wing!"	World Spaceport and Space	TBA	TBA
TBD; Package item: TBD; Word of this episode: TBD Super Wings helper: Dizzy and Astra
415	39	"Mission: Sneak Into Cube Headquarters!"	Golden Cube Headquarters	TBA	TBA
TBD; Package item: TBD; Word of this episode: TBD Super Wings helper: Dizzy, Donnie, Astra, and Max
416	40	"Power Up! The Ambassador's Miracle!"	TBD	TBA	TBA
TBD; Package item: TBD; Word of this episode: TBD Super Wings helper: Dizzy, Donnie and Astra
