= Germany at the 2024 Summer Olympics =

- IOC code: GER
- NOC: German Olympic Sports Confederation
- Website: www.dosb.de (in German, English, and French)

in Paris, France 26 July 2024 – 11 August 2024
- Competitors: 428 (216 men and 212 women) in 30 sports
- Flag bearers (opening): Dennis Schröder & Anna-Maria Wagner
- Flag bearers (closing): Max Rendschmidt & Laura Lindemann
- Officials: Olaf Tabor (chef de mission)
- Medals Ranked 10th: Gold 12 Silver 13 Bronze 8 Total 33

Summer Olympics appearances (overview)
- 1896; 1900; 1904; 1908; 1912; 1920–1924; 1928; 1932; 1936; 1948; 1952; 1956–1988; 1992; 1996; 2000; 2004; 2008; 2012; 2016; 2020; 2024; 2028

Other related appearances
- 1906 Intercalated Games –––– Saar (1952); United Team of Germany (1956–1964); East Germany (1968–1988); West Germany (1968–1988)

Germany participated at the 2024 Summer Olympics in Paris from 26 July to 11 August 2024. It was the nation's eighteenth consecutive appearance at the Summer Olympic Games, except for 1920 and 1924 due to the nation's role in World War I, and 1948 for the nation's role in World War II. From 1956 through 1964, Germans competed as part of the United Team of Germany (UTG); in 1968, the team was split into two teams West Germany and East Germany. West Germany boycotted the 1980 games as part of the American-led boycott, and then returned in 1984. East Germany boycotted the 1984 games as part of the Soviet-led boycott, and in 1988, East Germany returned for the last time. One year after the fall of the Berlin Wall, West and East Germany re-united as one country with their reunification in 1990, and it has participated in every Summer Olympics since 1992 games in Barcelona.

The German Olympic Sports Confederation appointed Olaf Tabor as the nation's chef de mission for Paris 2024.

Germany left Paris with 33 medals and a 10th place finish in the medal table, both marking its lowest results since reunification.

== Medalists ==
| Medal | Name | Sport | Event | Date |
|---|---|---|---|---|
| Gold | Lukas Märtens | Swimming | Men's 400 m freestyle | 27 July |
| Gold | Michael Jung | Equestrian | Individual eventing | 29 July |
| Gold | Oliver Zeidler | Rowing | Men's single sculls | 3 August |
| Gold | Jessica von Bredow-Werndl; Isabell Werth; Frederic Wandres | Equestrian | Team dressage | 3 August |
| Gold | Jessica von Bredow-Werndl | Equestrian | Individual dressage | 4 August |
| Gold | Tim Hellwig; Lisa Tertsch; Lasse Lührs; Laura Lindemann | Triathlon | Mixed relay triathlon | 5 August |
| Gold | Germany women's national 3x3 team: Svenja Brunckhorst; Sonja Greinacher; Elisa Mevius; Marie Reichert | Basketball | Women's 3x3 tournament | 5 August |
| Gold | Christian Kukuk | Equestrian | Individual jumping | 6 August |
| Gold | Max Lemke; Tom Liebscher; Max Rendschmidt; Jacob Schopf | Canoeing | Men's K-4 500 m | 8 August |
| Gold | Max Lemke; Jacob Schopf | Canoeing | Men's K-2 500 m | 9 August |
| Gold | Darja Varfolomeev | Gymnastics | Women's rhythmic individual all-around | 9 August |
| Gold | Yemisi Ogunleye | Athletics | Women's shot put | 9 August |
| Silver | Miriam Butkereit | Judo | Women's 70 kg | 31 July |
| Silver | Elena Lilik | Canoeing | Women's slalom C-1 | 31 July |
| Silver | Florian Unruh; Michelle Kroppen | Archery | Mixed team | 2 August |
| Silver | Leo Neugebauer | Athletics | Men's decathlon | 3 August |
| Silver | Isabell Werth | Equestrian | Individual dressage | 4 August |
| Silver | Sarah Brüßler; Jule Hake; Pauline Jagsch; Paulina Paszek | Canoeing | Women's K-4 500 m | 8 August |
| Silver | Germany men's national field hockey team: Jean Danneberg; Mats Grambusch; Tom Grambusch; Johannes Große; Malte Hellwig; Teo Hinrichs; Paul-Philipp Kaufmann; Moritz Ludwig; Marco Miltkau; Hannes Müller; Mathias Müller; Gonzalo Peillat; Thies Prinz; Christopher Rühr; Justus Weigand; Niklas Wellen; Lukas Windfeder; Martin Zwicker | Field hockey | Men's tournament | 8 August |
| Silver | Malaika Mihambo | Athletics | Women's long jump | 8 August |
| Silver | Oliver Klemet | Swimming | Men's marathon 10 km | 9 August |
| Silver | Esther Henseleit | Golf | Women's individual | 10 August |
| Silver | Nils Ehlers; Clemens Wickler | Volleyball | Men's beach | 10 August |
| Silver | Lea Sophie Friedrich | Cycling | Women's sprint | 11 August |
| Silver | Germany men's national handball team: Rune Dahmke; Justus Fischer; Johannes Golla; Marko Grgić; Kai Häfner; Sebastian Heymann; Tim Hornke; Juri Knorr; Jannik Kohlbacher; Lukas Mertens; David Späth; Christoph Steinert; Renārs Uščins; Luca Witzke; Andreas Wolff | Handball | Men's tournament | 11 August |
| Bronze | Maren Völz; Tabea Schendekehl; Leonie Menzel; Pia Greiten | Rowing | Women's quadruple sculls | 31 July |
| Bronze | Isabel Gose | Swimming | Women's 1500 m freestyle | 31 July |
| Bronze | Noah Hegge | Canoeing | Men's slalom kayak cross | 5 August |
| Bronze | Pauline Grabosch; Emma Hinze; Lea Sophie Friedrich | Cycling | Women's team sprint | 5 August |
| Bronze | Nelvie Tiafack | Boxing | Men's +92 kg | 7 August |
| Bronze | Jule Hake; Paulina Paszek | Canoeing | Women's K-2 500 m | 9 August |
| Bronze | Germany women's national football team: Nicole Anyomi; Ann-Katrin Berger; Jule Brand; Klara Bühl; Sara Doorsoun; Vivien Endemann; Laura Freigang; Merle Frohms; Giulia Gwinn; Marina Hegering; Kathrin Hendrich; Sarai Linder; Sydney Lohmann; Janina Minge; Sjoeke Nüsken; Alexandra Popp; Felicitas Rauch; Lea Schüller; Bibiane Schulze; Elisa Senß | Football | Women's tournament | 9 August |
| Bronze | Alexandra Burghardt; Rebekka Haase; Sophia Junk^{[a]} Gina Lückenkemper; Lisa Mayer | Athletics | Women's 4 × 100 m relay | 9 August |

Medals by sport
| Sport | 1st place, gold medalist(s) | 2nd place, silver medalist(s) | 3rd place, bronze medalist(s) | Total |
| Archery | 0 | 1 | 0 | 1 |
| Athletics | 1 | 2 | 1 | 4 |
| Basketball | 1 | 0 | 0 | 1 |
| Boxing | 0 | 0 | 1 | 1 |
| Canoeing | 2 | 2 | 2 | 6 |
| Cycling | 0 | 1 | 1 | 2 |
| Equestrian | 4 | 1 | 0 | 5 |
| Field hockey | 0 | 1 | 0 | 1 |
| Football | 0 | 0 | 1 | 1 |
| Golf | 0 | 1 | 0 | 1 |
| Gymnastics | 1 | 0 | 0 | 1 |
| Handball | 0 | 1 | 0 | 1 |
| Judo | 0 | 1 | 0 | 1 |
| Rowing | 1 | 0 | 1 | 2 |
| Swimming | 1 | 1 | 1 | 3 |
| Triathlon | 1 | 0 | 0 | 1 |
| Volleyball | 0 | 1 | 0 | 1 |
| Total | 12 | 13 | 8 | 33 |

Medals by gender
| Gender | 1st place, gold medalist(s) | 2nd place, silver medalist(s) | 3rd place, bronze medalist(s) | Total |
| Male | 6 | 5 | 2 | 13 |
| Female | 4 | 7 | 6 | 17 |
| Mixed | 2 | 1 | 0 | 3 |
| Total | 12 | 13 | 8 | 33 |

Medals by date
| Date | 1st place, gold medalist(s) | 2nd place, silver medalist(s) | 3rd place, bronze medalist(s) | Total |
| 27 July | 1 | 0 | 0 | 1 |
| 28 July | 0 | 0 | 0 | 0 |
| 29 July | 1 | 0 | 0 | 1 |
| 30 July | 0 | 0 | 0 | 0 |
| 31 July | 0 | 2 | 2 | 4 |
| 1 August | 0 | 0 | 0 | 0 |
| 2 August | 0 | 1 | 0 | 1 |
| 3 August | 2 | 1 | 0 | 3 |
| 4 August | 1 | 1 | 0 | 2 |
| 5 August | 2 | 0 | 2 | 4 |
| 6 August | 1 | 0 | 0 | 1 |
| 7 August | 0 | 0 | 1 | 1 |
| 8 August | 1 | 3 | 0 | 4 |
| 9 August | 3 | 1 | 3 | 7 |
| 10 August | 0 | 2 | 0 | 2 |
| 11 August | 0 | 2 | 0 | 2 |
| Total | 12 | 13 | 8 | 33 |

Multiple medalists
| Name | Sport | 1st place, gold medalist(s) | 2nd place, silver medalist(s) | 3rd place, bronze medalist(s) | Total |
| Max Lemke | Canoeing | 2 | 0 | 0 | 2 |
| Jacob Schopf | Canoeing | 2 | 0 | 0 | 2 |
| Jessica von Bredow-Werndl | Equestrian | 2 | 0 | 0 | 2 |
| Isabell Werth | Equestrian | 1 | 1 | 0 | 2 |
| Lea Sophie Friedrich | Cycling | 0 | 1 | 1 | 2 |
| Jule Hake | Canoeing | 0 | 1 | 1 | 2 |
| Paulina Paszek | Canoeing | 0 | 1 | 1 | 2 |

^{a} Athletes who participated in the heats only.

== Competitors ==
The following is the list of number of competitors in the Games.

| Sport | Men | Women | Total |
|---|---|---|---|
| Archery | 1 | 3 | 4 |
| Athletics | 42 | 37 | 79 |
| Badminton | 3 | 1 | 4 |
| Basketball | 12 | 16 | 28 |
| Boxing | 1 | 1 | 2 |
| Canoeing | 12 | 12 | 24 |
| Cycling | 12 | 13 | 25 |
| Diving | 4 | 5 | 9 |
| Equestrian | 6 | 3 | 9 |
| Fencing | 1 | 1 | 2 |
| Field hockey | 16 | 16 | 32 |
| Football | 0 | 18 | 18 |
| Golf | 2 | 2 | 4 |
| Gymnastics | 6 | 10 | 16 |
| Handball | 14 | 14 | 28 |
| Judo | 4 | 6 | 10 |
| Modern pentathlon | 2 | 2 | 4 |
| Rowing | 18 | 5 | 23 |
| Sailing | 7 | 7 | 14 |
| Shooting | 5 | 8 | 13 |
| Skateboarding | 1 | 1 | 2 |
| Sport climbing | 2 | 1 | 3 |
| Surfing | 1 | 1 | 2 |
| Swimming | 15 | 10 | 25 |
| Table tennis | 3 | 3 | 6 |
| Taekwondo | 0 | 1 | 1 |
| Tennis | 6 | 4 | 10 |
| Triathlon | 3 | 3 | 6 |
| Volleyball | 14 | 4 | 18 |
| Wrestling | 3 | 4 | 7 |
| Total | 216 | 212 | 428 |

== Archery ==
German entered four archers into the games. The first German qualified for the games by virtue of gold-medal victory in men's recurve individual events at the 2023 European Games in Kraków, Poland. Another German's fielded a full-squad of women's team by virtue of their gold-medal victory at the 2023 World Championships in Berlin, Germany.

| Athlete | Event | Ranking round | | Round of 64 | Round of 32 | Round of 16 | Quarterfinals | Semifinals | Final / BM | |
| Athlete | Event | Score | Seed | Opposition Score | Opposition Score | Opposition Score | Opposition Score | Opposition Score | Opposition Score | Rank |
|---|---|---|---|---|---|---|---|---|---|---|
| Florian Unruh | Men's individual | 681 | 3 | Tolba (EGY); W 6–0 | Nakanishi (JPN); W 6–4 | T Hall (GBR); W 7–3 | Addis (FRA); W 6–5 | Ellison (USA); L 3–7 | Lee (KOR); L 0–6 | 4 |
| Katharina Bauer | Women's individual | 656 | 27 | GNoriega (USA); L 0–6 | Did not advance | | | | | |
| Michelle Kroppen | Women's individual | 670 | 7 | Cesarini (SMR); W 7–3 | Ramazanova (AZE); W 6–2 | Kumari (IND); L 4–6 | Did not advance | | | |
| Charline Schwarz | Women's individual | 639 | 45 | Vázquez (MEX); W 6–4 | Jeon (KOR); L 7–1 | Did not advance | | | | |
| Katharina Bauer; Michelle Kroppen; Charline Schwarz | Women's team | 1965 | 6 | —N/a | | Great Britain; W 6–0 | Mexico; L 1–5 | Did not advance | | |
| Florian Unruh; Michelle Kroppen | Mixed team | 1351 | 2 Q | —N/a | | Colombia; W 5–4 | Mexico; W 5–1 | United States; W 5–3 | South Korea; L 0–6 | 2nd place, silver medalist(s) |

== Athletics ==
German track and field athletes achieved the entry standards for Paris 2024, either by passing the direct qualifying mark (or time for track and road races) or by world ranking, in the following events (a maximum of 3 athletes each):

Key

- Note–Ranks given for track events are within the athlete's heat only
- Q = Qualified for the next round
- q = Qualified for the next round as a fastest loser or, in field events, by position without achieving the qualifying target
- R = Qualified for the repechage round
- NR = National record
- N/A = Round not applicable for the event
- Bye = Athlete not required to compete in round

Track and road events
Men

| Athlete | Event | Heat | | Repechage | | Semifinal | | Final | |
| Athlete | Event | Result | Rank | Result | Rank | Result | Rank | Result | Rank |
|---|---|---|---|---|---|---|---|---|---|
| Owen Ansah | 100 m | 10.22 | 5 | —N/a | | Did not advance | | | |
| Joshua Hartmann | 100 m | 10.16 | 3 Q | —N/a | | 10.16 | 7 | Did not advance | |
| Joshua Hartmann | 200 m | 20.30 | 3 Q | Bye | | 20.47 | 5 | Did not advance | |
| Jean Paul Bredau | 400 m | 45.07 | 20 R | 45.40 | 6 | Did not advance | | | |
| Robert Farken | 1500 m | 3:36.62 | 6 Q | Bye | | 3:33.35 | 7 | Did not advance | |
| Marius Probst | 1500 m | 3:35.65 | 7 R | 3:36.54 | 18 | Did not advance | | | |
| Manuel Mordi | 110 m hurdles | 13.48 | 4 R | 13.55 | 4 | Did not advance | | | |
| Joshua Abuaku | 400 m hurdles | 49.00 | 4 R | 48.87 SB | 2 Q | 50.19 | 8 | Did not advance | |
| Emil Agyekum | 400 m hurdles | 49.38 | 4 R | 48.67 | 2 Q | 48.78 | 5 | Did not advance | |
| Constantin Preis | 400 m hurdles | 49.99 | 8 R | 51.02 | 5 | Did not advance | | | |
| Karl Bebendorf | 3000 m steeplechase | 8:20.46 | 7 | —N/a | | | | Did not advance | |
| Frederik Ruppert | 3000 m steeplechase | 8:25.31 | 6 | —N/a | | | | Did not advance | |
| Velten Schneider | 3000 m steeplechase | 8:25.75 | 10 | —N/a | | | | Did not advance | |
| Owen Ansah; Lucas Ansah-Peprah; Kevin Kranz; Yannick Wolf | 4 × 100 m relay | 38.53 | 5 | —N/a | | | | Did not advance | |
| Emil Agyekum; Jean Paul Bredau; Marc Koch; Manuel Sanders | 4 × 400 m relay | 3:00.29 SB | 6 | —N/a | | | | Did not advance | |
| Samuel Fitwi Sibhatu | Marathon | —N/a | | | | | | 2:09.50 | 15 |
| Amanal Petros | Marathon | —N/a | | | | | | DNF | |
| Richard Ringer | Marathon | —N/a | | | | | | 2:09.18 SB | 12 |
| Leo Köpp | 20 km walk | —N/a | | | | | | 1:21:36 | 23 |
| Christopher Linke | 20 km walk | —N/a | | | | | | 1:20:35 | 19 |

Women

| Athlete | Event | Heat | | Repechage | | Semifinal | | Final | |
| Athlete | Event | Result | Rank | Result | Rank | Result | Rank | Result | Rank |
|---|---|---|---|---|---|---|---|---|---|
| Rebekka Haase | 100 m | 11.28 | 32 | —N/a | | Did not advance | | | |
| Gina Lückenkemper | 100 m | 11.08 | 13 Q | —N/a | | 11.09 | 10 | Did not advance | |
| Majtie Kolberg | 800 m | 2:00.55 | 31 R | 1:59.08 | 1 Q | 1:58.52 PB | 15 | Did not advance | |
| Nele Weßel | 1500 m | 4:08.55 | 11 R | 4:07.22 | 9 | Did not advance | | | |
| Hanna Klein | 5000 m | 15:31.85 | 14 | —N/a | | | | Did not advance | |
| Carolina Krafzik | 400 m hurdles | 58.49 | 8 R | 56.02 | 6 | Did not advance | | | |
| Olivia Gürth | 3000 m steeplechase | 9:16.47 PB | 6 | —N/a | | | | Did not advance | |
| Gesa Krause | 3000 m steeplechase | 9:10.68 SB | 3 Q | —N/a | | | | 9:26.96 | 14 |
| Lea Meyer | 3000 m steeplechase | 9:14.85 PB | 3 Q | —N/a | | | | 9:09.59 PB | 10 |
| Alexandra Burghardt; Rebekka Haase; Sophia Junk; Gina Lückenkemper; Lisa Mayer | 4 × 100 m relay | 42.15 SB | 2 Q | —N/a | | | | 41.97 SB | 3rd place, bronze medalist(s) |
| Eileen Demes; Mona Mayer; Skadi Schier; Alica Schmidt | 4 × 400 m relay | 3:26.95 | 7 | —N/a | | | | Did not advance | |
| Laura Hottenrott | Marathon | —N/a | | | | | | 2:31:19 SB | 38 |
| Melat Yisak Kejeta | Marathon | —N/a | | | | | | DNF | |
| Domenika Mayer | Marathon | —N/a | | | | | | 2:30:14 | 29 |
| Saskia Feige | 20 km walk | —N/a | | | | | | 1:33:23 SB | 28 |

Mixed

| Athlete | Event | Heat | | Final | |
| Athlete | Event | Time | Rank | Time | Rank |
|---|---|---|---|---|---|
| Jean Paul Bredau; Alica Schmidt; Manuel Sanders; Eileen Demes | 4 × 400 m relay | 3:15.63 | 15 | Did not advance | |
| Saskia Feige; Christopher Linke | Marathon walk relay | —N/a | | 2:56:14 | 10 |

Field events
Men

| Athlete | Event | Qualification | | Final | |
| Athlete | Event | Distance | Position | Distance | Position |
|---|---|---|---|---|---|
| Tobias Potye | High jump | NM | — | Did not advance | |
| Bo Kanda Lita Baehre | Pole vault | 5.75 | 10 q | 5.70 | 9 |
| Torben Blech | Pole vault | 5.40 | 23 | Did not advance | |
| Oleg Zernikel | Pole vault | 5.75 | 1 q | 5.70 | 9 |
| Simon Batz | Long jump | 7.90 | 12 q | 8.07 | 6 |
| Max Heß | Triple jump | 16.98 | 7 q | 17.38 SB | 7 |
| Henrik Janssen | Discus throw | NM | — | Did not advance | |
| Clemens Prüfer | Discus throw | 66.36 | 4 Q | 67.41 | 6 |
| Miká Sosna | Discus throw | 61.81 | 21 | Did not advance | |
| Max Dehning | Javelin throw | 79.24 | 22 | Did not advance | |
| Julian Weber | Javelin throw | 87.76 | 3 Q | 87.40 | 6 |
| Merlin Hummel | Hammer throw | 75.25 | 12 q | 76.03 | 10 |
| Sören Klose | Hammer throw | 71.20 | 28 | Did not advance | |

Women

| Athlete | Event | Qualification | | Final | |
| Athlete | Event | Distance | Position | Distance | Position |
|---|---|---|---|---|---|
| Christina Honsel | High jump | 1.95 =SB | 6 q | 1.95 =SB | 6 |
| Imke Onnen | High jump | 1.92 | 14 | Did not advance | |
| Anjuli Knäsche | Pole vault | 4.40 | 12 q | 4.40 | 14 |
| Mikaelle Assani | Long jump | 6.24 | 28 | Did not advance | |
| Malaika Mihambo | Long jump | 6.86 | 3 Q | 6.98 | 2nd place, silver medalist(s) |
| Laura Raquel Müller | Long jump | 6.40 | 20 | Did not advance | |
| Alina Kenzel | Shot put | 18.16 | 11 q | 18.29 | 9 |
| Katharina Maisch | Shot put | 17.86 | 16 | Did not advance | |
| Yemisi Ogunleye | Shot put | 19.24 | 3 Q | 20.00 | 1st place, gold medalist(s) |
| Kristin Pudenz | Discus throw | 63.45 | 8 q | 60.38 | 10 |
| Marike Steinacker | Discus throw | 62.63 | 12 q | 65.37 | 4 |
| Claudine Vita | Discus throw | 62.70 | 11 q | 63.62 | 6 |
| Christin Hussong | Javelin throw | 59.99 | 18 | Did not advance | |

Combined events – Men's decathlon

| Athlete | Event | 100 m | LJ | SP | HJ | 400 m | 110H | DT | PV | JT | 1500 m | Final | Rank |
|---|---|---|---|---|---|---|---|---|---|---|---|---|---|
| Till Steinforth | Result | 10.52 | 7.61 | 13.96 | 1.96 | 47.96 | 14.37 | 42.59 SB | 4.70 | 59.14 | 4:45.43 | 8170 | 15 |
| Till Steinforth | Points | 970 | 962 | 726 | 767 | 911 | 927 | 717 | 819 | 707 | 646 | 8170 | 15 |
| Niklas Kaul | Result | 11.34 =SB | 7.09 | 14.24 | 2.02 SB | 49.13 | 14.53 | 46.28 | 4.80 | 77.78 ODB | 4:15.00 | 8445 | 8 |
| Niklas Kaul | Points | 786 | 835 | 743 | 822 | 855 | 907 | 793 | 849 | 1009 | 846 | 8445 | 8 |
| Leo Neugebauer | Result | 10.67 | 7.98 SB | 16.55 | 2.05 | 47.70 SB | 14.51 | 53.33 | 5.00 | 56.64 | 4:44.67 | 8748 | 2nd place, silver medalist(s) |
| Leo Neugebauer | Points | 935 | 1056 | 885 | 850 | 924 | 910 | 940 | 910 | 687 | 651 | 8748 | 2nd place, silver medalist(s) |

Combined event – Women's heptathlon

| Athlete | Event | 100H | HJ | SP | 200 m | LJ | JT | 800 m | Final | Rank |
|---|---|---|---|---|---|---|---|---|---|---|
| Carolin Schäfer | Result | 13.42 | 1.71 | 14.02 | 23.85 SB | 5.52 | 46.45 | 2:16.78 SB | 6084 SB | 17 |
| Carolin Schäfer | Points | 1062 | 867 | 795 | 995 | 706 | 791 | 868 | 6084 SB | 17 |
| Sophie Weißenberg | Result | DNS | — | — | — | — | — | — | DNS | |
| Sophie Weißenberg | Points | 0 | — | — | — | — | — | — | DNS | |

== Badminton ==
Germany entered four badminton players into the Olympic tournament based on the BWF Race to Paris Rankings.

| Athlete | Event | Group stage | | | | Round of 16 | Quarter-final | Semi-final | Final / BM | |
| Athlete | Event | Opposition Score | Opposition Score | Opposition Score | Rank | Opposition Score | Opposition Score | Opposition Score | Opposition Score | Rank |
|---|---|---|---|---|---|---|---|---|---|---|
| Fabian Roth | Men's singles | Prannoy (IND); L (18–21, 12–21) | Lê (VIE); L (10–21, 10–21) | —N/a | 3 | Did not advance | | | | |
| Mark Lamsfuß; Marvin Seidel | Men's doubles | Alfian / Ardianto (INA); L (13–21, 17–21) | Rankireddy / Shetty (IND); L | Labar / Corvée (FRA); L | 3 | —N/a | Did not advance | | | |
| Yvonne Li | Women's singles | Chen (CHN); L (14–21, 21–17, 9–21) | Blichfeldt (DEN); L (14–21, 21–14, 12–21) | —N/a | 3 | Did not advance | | | | |

== Basketball ==
=== 5x5 basketball ===
Summary

| Team | Event | Group stage | | | | Quarterfinal | Semifinal | Bronze medal match | |
| Team | Event | Opposition Score | Opposition Score | Opposition Score | Rank | Opposition Score | Opposition Score | Opposition Score | Rank |
|---|---|---|---|---|---|---|---|---|---|
| Germany men's | Men's tournament | Japan; W 97–77 | Brazil; W 86–73 | France; W 85–71 | 1 Q | Greece; W 76–63 | France; L 69–73 | Serbia; L 83–93 | 4 |
| Germany women's | Women's tournament | Belgium; W 83–69 | Japan; W 75–64 | United States; L 68–87 | 2 Q | France; L 71–84 | Did not advance | | |

==== Men's tournament ====
The Germany men's basketball team qualified for the games by virtue of their results through the 2023 FIBA Basketball World Cup in Okinawa, as one of the two highest ranks from the European zone.

Team roster

A 16-player roster was announced on 4 June 2024. The final squad was revealed on 12 July 2024.

Germany men's national basketball team – 2024 Summer Olympics roster
Players
Coaches

| Pos. | No. | Name | Age – Date of birth | Height | Club | Ctr. |
|---|---|---|---|---|---|---|
| SF | 0 | Isaac Bonga | 24 – 8 November 1999 | 2.03 m (6 ft 8 in) | Partizan | (Serbia) |
| PF | 1 | Oscar da Silva | 25 – 21 September 1998 | 2.06 m (6 ft 9 in) | Bayern Munich | (Germany) |
| PG | 4 | Maodo Lô | 31 – 31 December 1992 | 1.91 m (6 ft 3 in) | Olimpia Milano | (Italy) |
| SF | 5 | Niels Giffey | 33 – 8 June 1991 | 2.00 m (6 ft 7 in) | Bayern Munich | (Germany) |
| G | 6 | Nick Weiler-Babb | 28 – 12 December 1995 | 1.96 m (6 ft 5 in) | Bayern Munich | (Germany) |
| C | 7 | Johannes Voigtmann | 31 – 30 September 1992 | 2.11 m (6 ft 11 in) | Olimpia Milano | (Italy) |
| G/F | 9 | Franz Wagner | 22 – 27 August 2001 | 2.08 m (6 ft 10 in) | Orlando Magic | (United States) |
| F/C | 10 | Daniel Theis | 32 – 4 April 1992 | 2.03 m (6 ft 8 in) | New Orleans Pelicans | (United States) |
| F/C | 13 | Moritz Wagner | 27 – 26 April 1997 | 2.11 m (6 ft 11 in) | Orlando Magic | (United States) |
| PG | 17 | Dennis Schröder (C) | 30 – 15 September 1993 | 1.85 m (6 ft 1 in) | Brooklyn Nets | (United States) |
| PF | 32 | Johannes Thiemann | 30 – 9 February 1994 | 2.05 m (6 ft 9 in) | Gunma Crane Thunders | (Japan) |
| SG | 42 | Andreas Obst | 28 – 13 July 1996 | 1.91 m (6 ft 3 in) | Bayern Munich | (Germany) |

Head coach

- (Canada) / (Finland) Gordon Herbert

Assistant coach(es)

- (Germany) Klaus Perwas

Legend

- (C) Team captain
- Club – describes last
  club before the competition
- Age – describes age
  on 27 July 2024

Group play

| Pos | Team | Pld | W | L | PF | PA | PD | Pts | Qualification |
|---|---|---|---|---|---|---|---|---|---|
| 1 | Germany | 3 | 3 | 0 | 268 | 221 | +47 | 6 | Quarterfinals |
| 2 | France (H) | 3 | 2 | 1 | 243 | 241 | +2 | 5 | Quarterfinals |
| 3 | Brazil | 3 | 1 | 2 | 241 | 248 | −7 | 4 | Quarterfinals |
| 4 | Japan | 3 | 0 | 3 | 251 | 293 | −42 | 3 | |

Source: FIBA
Rules for classification: 1) classification points; 2) head-to-head results; 3) head-to-head game points difference; 4) head-to-head number of game points scored.
(H) Hosts

27 July 2024
13:30

Report

| Germany | 97–77 | Japan |
Scoring by quarter: 28–21, 24–23, 22–17, 23–16
| Pts: F. Wagner 22; Rebs: Theis 7 Asts: Schröder 12 | | Pts: Hachimura 20; Rebs: Hawkinson 11; Asts: Kawamura 7 |

Stade Pierre-Mauroy, Lille
Attendance: 26,991
Referees: Antonio Conde (ESP), Boris Krejić (SLO), Amy Bonner (USA)

30 July 2024
21:00

Report

| Brazil | 73–86 | Germany |
Scoring by quarter: 10–22, 30–18, 11–20, 22–26
| Pts: Dos Santos 18; Rebs: Meindl 6 Asts: Dos Santos 8 | | Pts: Schröder 20; Rebs: Voigtmann 8 Asts: Schröder 6 |

Stade Pierre-Mauroy, Lille
Attendance: 23,884
Referees: Antonio Conde (ESP), Omar Bermúdez (MEX), Gatis Saliņš (LAT)

2 August 2024
21:00

Report

| France | 71–85 | Germany |
Scoring by quarter: 18–24, 9–24, 19–21, 25–16
| Pts: Wembanyama 14; Rebs: Wembanyama 12; Asts: Batum 3 | | Pts: Schröder, F. Wagner 26; Rebs: Theis 8 Asts: Schröder 9 |

Stade Pierre-Mauroy, Lille
Attendance: 26,860
Referees: Antonio Conde (ESP), Juan Fernández (ARG), Andrés Bartel (URU)

Quarterfinals

6 August 2024
11:00

Report

| Germany | 76–63 | Greece |
Scoring by quarter: 11–21, 25–15, 23–16, 17–11
| Pts: F. Wagner 18; Rebs: Theis 8 Asts: Schröder 8 | | Pts: Antetokounmpo 22; Rebs: Papanikolaou 9 Asts: Antetokounmpo 3 |

Accor Arena, Paris
Attendance: 12,288
Referees: Roberto Vázquez (PUR), Mārtiņš Kozlovskis (LAT), Johnny Batista (PUR)

Semifinals

8 August 2024
17:30

Report

| France | 73–69 | Germany |
Scoring by quarter: 18–25, 15–8, 23–17, 17–19
| Pts: Yabusele 17; Rebs: three players 7 Asts: Wembanyama 4 | | Pts: Schröder 18; Rebs: Theis 11; Asts: Theis 6 |

Accor Arena, Paris
Attendance: 12,454
Referees: Antonio Conde (ESP), Boris Krejić (SLO), Wojciech Liszka (POL)

Bronze medal game

10 August 2024
11:00

Report

| Germany | 83–93 | Serbia |
Scoring by quarter: 21–30, 17–16, 25–26, 20–21
| Pts: F. Wagner 18; Rebs: F. Wagner 9 Asts: Schröder, Weiler-Babb 6 | | Pts: Jokić, Micić 19; Rebs: Jokić 12; Asts: Jokić 11 |

Accor Arena, Paris
Attendance: 12,406
Referees: Matthew Kallio (CAN), Yohan Rosso (FRA), Johnny Batista (PUR)

==== Women's tournament ====
The Germany women's national basketball team qualified for the games by placing in the top three at the 2024 Olympic Qualifying Tournament in Belém, Brazil.

Team roster

A 18-player roster was announced on 19 June 2024. It was reduced to 15 players on 12 July 2024. The final squad was revealed on 15 July 2024.

Germany women's national basketball team – 2024 Summer Olympics roster
Players
Coaches

| Pos. | No. | Name | Age – Date of birth | Height | Club | Ctr. |
|---|---|---|---|---|---|---|
| F | 0 | Satou Sabally | 26 – 25 April 1998 | 1.90 m (6 ft 3 in) | Dallas Wings | (United States) |
| PG | 1 | Alexis Peterson | 29 – 20 June 1995 | 1.65 m (5 ft 5 in) | CCC Polkowice | (Poland) |
| G | 3 | Alexandra Wilke | 27 – 29 September 1996 | 1.75 m (5 ft 9 in) | Rutronik Stars Keltern | (Germany) |
| PF | 8 | Nyara Sabally | 24 – 26 February 2000 | 1.87 m (6 ft 2 in) | New York Liberty | (United States) |
| PF | 11 | Marie Gülich (C) | 30 – 28 May 1994 | 1.95 m (6 ft 5 in) | Valencia Basket | (Spain) |
| SG | 13 | Leonie Fiebich | 24 – 10 January 2000 | 1.92 m (6 ft 4 in) | New York Liberty | (United States) |
| C | 15 | Luisa Geiselsöder | 24 – 10 February 2000 | 1.90 m (6 ft 3 in) | Basket Landes | (France) |
| SF | 16 | Alina Hartmann | 28 – 23 October 1995 | 1.85 m (6 ft 1 in) | BC Namur-Capitale | (Belgium) |
| PF | 20 | Frieda Bühner | 20 – 28 May 2004 | 1.86 m (6 ft 1 in) | CB Estudiantes | (Spain) |
| SF | 22 | Emily Bessoir | 22 – 19 November 2001 | 1.92 m (6 ft 4 in) | UCLA Bruins | (United States) |
| PG | 24 | Lina Sontag | 20 – 24 November 2003 | 1.91 m (6 ft 3 in) | UCLA Bruins | (United States) |
| SF | 46 | Romy Bär | 37 – 17 May 1987 | 1.87 m (6 ft 2 in) | GISA LIONS MBC | (Germany) |

Head coach

- (Canada) Lisa Thomaidis

Assistant coach(es)

- (Canada) Claire Meadows
- (United States) Sidney Parsons
- (United States) Anne Marie Thuss

Legend

- (C) Team captain
- Club – describes last
  club before the tournament
- Age – describes age
  on 28 July 2024

Group play

| Pos | Team | Pld | W | L | PF | PA | PD | Pts | Qualification |
|---|---|---|---|---|---|---|---|---|---|
| 1 | United States | 3 | 3 | 0 | 276 | 218 | +58 | 6 | Quarterfinals |
| 2 | Germany | 3 | 2 | 1 | 226 | 220 | +6 | 5 | Quarterfinals |
| 3 | Belgium | 3 | 1 | 2 | 228 | 228 | 0 | 4 | Quarterfinals |
| 4 | Japan | 3 | 0 | 3 | 198 | 262 | −64 | 3 | |

Source: FIBA
Rules for classification: 1) classification points; 2) head-to-head results; 3) head-to-head game points difference; 4) head-to-head number of game points scored.

29 July 2024
13:30

Report

| Germany | 83–69 | Belgium |
Scoring by quarter: 25–11, 21–14, 14–17, 23–27
| Pts: S. Sabally 17; Rebs: Gülich 7 Asts: Peterson 8 | | Pts: Meesseman 25; Rebs: Linskens 6 Asts: Vanloo 6 |

Stade Pierre-Mauroy, Lille
Attendance: 20,211
Referees: Martin Vulić (CRO), Carlos Peralta (ECU), Yann Davidson (MAD)

1 August 2024
11:00

Report

| Japan | 64–75 | Germany |
Scoring by quarter: 16–21, 20–21, 13–17, 15–16
| Pts: Takada 15; Rebs: Akaho 8 Asts: Machida 9 | | Pts: S. Sabally 33; Rebs: Gülich, Geiselsöder 10; Asts: Fiebich 6 |

Stade Pierre-Mauroy, Lille
Attendance: 20,962
Referees: Gatis Saliņš (LAT), Viola Györgyi (NOR), Yevgeniy Mikheyev (KAZ)

4 August 2024
17:15

Report

| Germany | 68–87 | United States |
Scoring by quarter: 19–16, 10–25, 17–28, 22–18
| Pts: S. Sabally 15; Rebs: Geiselsöder 8 Asts: Peterson 4 | | Pts: Young 19; Rebs: Collier 7 Asts: three players 5 |

Stade Pierre-Mauroy, Lille
Attendance: 25,844
Referees: Julio Anaya (PAN), Gatis Saliņš (LAT), Viola Györgyi (NOR)

Quarterfinals

7 August 2024
18:00

Report

| Germany | 71–84 | France |
Scoring by quarter: 19–23, 14–22, 16–21, 22–18
| Pts: N. Sabally 20; Rebs: N. Sabally 13; Asts: Fiebich, Peterson 3 | | Pts: Johannès 24; Rebs: Williams 6 Asts: Williams 5 |

Accor Arena, Paris
Attendance: 12,399
Referees: Amy Bonner (USA), Carlos Peralta (ECU), Blanca Burns (USA)

=== 3x3 basketball ===
Summary

| Team | Event | Group stage | | | | | | | | Play-in | Semifinal | Final / BM | |
| Team | Event | Opposition Score | Opposition Score | Opposition Score | Opposition Score | Opposition Score | Opposition Score | Opposition Score | Rank | Opposition Score | Opposition Score | Opposition Score | Rank |
|---|---|---|---|---|---|---|---|---|---|---|---|---|---|
| Germany women's | Women's tournament | United States; W 17–13 | Australia; L 19–21 | Canada; W 19–15 | Azerbaijan; W 12–8 | China; W 18–15 | France; W 14–13 | Spain; W 18–15 | 1 SF | Bye | Canada; W 16–15 | Spain; W 17–16 | 1st place, gold medalist(s) |

==== Women's tournament ====
The German women's 3x3 team qualified for the Olympics by finishing in the top three at the Olympic Qualifying Tournament in Debrecen, Hungary.

Team roster

- Svenja Brunckhorst
- Sonja Greinacher
- Elisa Mevius
- Marie Reichert

Group play

| Pos | Team | Pld | W | L | PF | PA | PD | Qualification |
|---|---|---|---|---|---|---|---|---|
| 1 | Germany | 7 | 6 | 1 | 117 | 100 | +17 | Semifinals |
| 2 | Spain | 7 | 4 (Note: Spain 2–1; United States 2–1; Canada 1–2; Australia 1–2. Sorted by points scored after first tie broken.) | 3 | 115 | 114 | +1 | Semifinals |
| 3 | United States | 7 | 4 | 3 | 108 | 109 | −1 | Play-ins |
| 4 | Canada | 7 | 4 | 3 | 129 | 112 | +17 | Play-ins |
| 5 | Australia | 7 | 4 | 3 | 127 | 122 | +5 | Play-ins |
| 6 | China | 7 | 2 (Note: China 1–1; France 1–1; Azerbaijan 1–1. Sorted by points scored.) | 5 | 107 | 123 | −16 | Play-ins |
| 7 | Azerbaijan | 7 | 2 | 5 | 106 | 123 | −17 | |
| 8 | France (H) | 7 | 2 | 5 | 99 | 105 | −6 | |

Source: FIBA
Rules for classification: 1) Wins; 2) Head-to-head record; 3) Points scored.
(H) Hosts
Notes:

30 July 2024
17:30

Boxscore

| Germany | 17–13 | United States |
| Pts: Greinacher, Reichert 5 | | Pts: Van Lith 6 |

Place de la Concorde, Paris
Referees: Markos Michaelides (SUI), Kim Ga-in (KOR)

31 July 2024
17:30

Boxscore

| Germany | 19–21 | Australia |
| Pts: Greinacher 9 | | Pts: Whittle 9 |

Place de la Concorde, Paris
Referees: Marek Maliszewski (POL), Dorothy Okatch (BOT)

1 August 2024
09:30

Boxscore

| Germany | 19–15 | Canada |
| Pts: Greinacher 8 | | Pts: K. Plouffe, M. Plouffe 5 |

Place de la Concorde, Paris
Referees: Jasmina Juras (SRB), Dorothy Okatch (BOT)

1 August 2024
18:30

Boxscore

| Germany | 12–8 | Azerbaijan |
| Pts: Brunckhorst, Reichert 4 | | Pts: Mollenhauer 4 |

Place de la Concorde, Paris
Referees: Kim Ga-in (KOR), Edmond Ho (HKG)

2 August 2024
09:00

Boxscore

| China | 15–18 | Germany |
| Pts: Chen 6 | | Pts: Reichert 7 |

Place de la Concorde, Paris
Referees: Marek Maliszewski (POL), Dorothy Okatch (BOT)

2 August 2024
21:30

Boxscore

| France | 13–14 | Germany |
| Pts: Guapo 4 | | Pts: Greinacher 7 |

Place de la Concorde, Paris
Referees: Shi Qirong (CHN), Vlad Ghizdareanu (ROU)

3 August 2024
18:00

Boxscore

| Spain | 15–18 | Germany |
| Pts: Alonso de Armiño 5 | | Pts: Greinacher, Reichert 5 |

Place de la Concorde, Paris
Referees: Najib Chajiddine (FRA), Shi Qirong (CHN)

Semifinal

5 August 2024
18:30

Boxscore

| Germany | 16–15 | Canada |
| Pts: Greinacher 11 | | Pts: three players 4 |

Place de la Concorde, Paris
Referees: Jasmina Juras (SRB), Najib Chajiddine (FRA)

Gold medal game

5 August 2024
22:00

Boxscore

| Germany | 17–16 | Spain |
| Pts: Greinacher 5 | | Pts: Camilión 6 |

Place de la Concorde, Paris
Referees: Edmond Ho (HKG), Brigitta Csabai-Kaskötő (HUN)

== Boxing ==
Germany entered two boxers into the Olympic tournament. Nelvie Tiafack (men's super heavyweight) and Maxi Klötzer (women's flyweight) qualified themself to Paris by winning the quota bouts round at the 2024 World Olympic Qualification Tournament 1 in Busto Arsizio, Italy.

| Athlete | Event | Round of 32 | Round of 16 | Quarterfinals | Semifinals | Final | |
| Athlete | Event | Opposition Result | Opposition Result | Opposition Result | Opposition Result | Opposition Result | Rank |
|---|---|---|---|---|---|---|---|
| Magomed Schachidov | Men's 71 kg | Muxanga (MOZ); L 1–4 | Did not advance | | | | |
| Nelvie Tiafack | Men's +92 kg | —N/a | Abdullayev (AZE); W 5–0 | Lenzi (ITA); W 5–0 | Jalolov (UZB); L 0–5 | Did not advance | 3rd place, bronze medalist(s) |
| Maxi Klötzer | Women's 50 kg | Zareen (IND); L 0–5 | Did not advance | | | | |

== Canoeing ==
=== Slalom ===
Germany entered four boats into the slalom competition, for the Games through the 2023 ICF Canoe Slalom World Championships in London, Great Britain.

| Athlete | Event | Preliminary | | | | | | Semifinal | | Final | |
| Athlete | Event | Run 1 | Rank | Run 2 | Rank | Best | Rank | Time | Rank | Time | Rank |
|---|---|---|---|---|---|---|---|---|---|---|---|
| Sideris Tasiadis | Men's C-1 | 92.44 | 6 | 92.43 | 7 | 92.43 | 7 Q | 96.74 | 3 Q | 97.27 | 4 |
| Noah Hegge | Men's K-1 | 87.67 | 8 | 87.15 | 6 | 87.15 | 10 Q | 91.24 | 2 Q | 89.73 | 7 |
| Elena Lilik | Women's C-1 | 107.95 | 7 | 103.29 | 2 | 103.29 | 5 Q | 113.59 | 7 F | 103.54 | 2nd place, silver medalist(s) |
| Ricarda Funk | Women's K-1 | 97.15 | 7 | 94.95 | 6 | 94.95 | 6 Q | 97.31 | 1 Q | 149.08 | 11 |

=== Kayak cross ===
| Athlete | Event | Time trial | Rank | Round 1 | Repechage | Heat | Quarterfinal | Semifinal | Final | |
| Athlete | Event | Time trial | Rank | Position | Position | Position | Position | Position | Position | Rank |
|---|---|---|---|---|---|---|---|---|---|---|
| Noah Hegge | Men's kayak cross | 68.01 | 8 | 1 Q | Bye | 1 Q | 1 Q | 1 FA | 3 | 3rd place, bronze medalist(s) |
| Stefan Hengst | Men's kayak cross | 69.67 FLT (6) | 38 | 2 Q | Bye | 4 | Did not advance | | | 30 |
| Ricarda Funk | Women's kayak cross | 72.89 | 7 | 1 Q | Bye | 2 Q | 4 | Did not advance | | 14 |
| Elena Lilik | Women's kayak cross | 74.19 | 13 | 1 Q | Bye | 1 Q | 1 Q | 2 FA | 4 | 4 |

=== Sprint ===
Germany canoeists qualified eight boats in each of the following distances for the Games through the 2023 ICF Canoe Sprint World Championships in Duisburg, Germany.

Men

| Athlete | Event | Heats | | Quarterfinals | | Semifinals | | Final | |
| Athlete | Event | Time | Rank | Time | Rank | Time | Rank | Time | Rank |
|---|---|---|---|---|---|---|---|---|---|
| Jakob Thordsen | K-1 1000 m | 3:29.88 | 2 SF | Bye | | 3:29.34 | 3 FA | 3:36.82 | 8 |
| Anton Winkelmann | K-1 1000 m | 3:27.80 | 1 SF | Bye | | 3:31.51 | 7 FB | 3:28.04 | 10 |
| Max Lemke; Jacob Schopf | K-2 500 m | 1:28.03 | 1 SF | Bye | | 1:28.13 | 1 FA | 1:26.87 | 1st place, gold medalist(s) |
| Tom Liebscher-Lucz; Max Rendschmidt | K-2 500 m | 1:28.39 | 1 SF | Bye | | 1:27.67 | 4 FA | 1:27.54 | 5 |
| Max Lemke; Tom Liebscher-Lucz; Max Rendschmidt; Jacob Schopf | K-4 500 m | 1:20.51 | 1 SF | Bye | | 39.07 | 1 Q | 1:19.80 | 1st place, gold medalist(s) |
| Sebastian Brendel | C-1 1000 m | 3:45.48 | 1 SF | Bye | | 3:44.78 | 1 FA | 3:51.44 | 8 |
| Tim Hecker; Peter Kretschmer | C-2 500 m | 1:41.58 | 6 QF | 1:39.94 | 1 SF | 1:41.58 | 2 FA | 1:41.62 | 5 |

Women

| Athlete | Event | Heats | | Quarterfinals | | Semifinals | | Final | |
| Athlete | Event | Time | Rank | Time | Rank | Time | Rank | Time | Rank |
|---|---|---|---|---|---|---|---|---|---|
| Enja Rößeling | K-1 500 m | 1:56.88 | 5 QF | 1:52.74 | 4 SF | 1:57.22 | 8 | Did not advance | |
| Jule Hake; Paulina Paszek | K-2 500 m | 1:39.03 | 1 SF | Bye | | 1:38.84 | 2 FA | 1:39.46 | 3rd place, bronze medalist(s) |
| Pauline Jagsch; Lena Röhlings | K-2 500 m | 1:41.45 | 1 SF | Bye | | 1:39.51 | 1 FA | 1:40.09 | 6 |
| Sarah Brüßler; Jule Hake; Pauline Jagsch; Paulina Paszek | K-4 500 m | 1:32.34 | 1 FA | —N/a | | Bye | | 1:32.62 | 2nd place, silver medalist(s) |
| Lisa Jahn | C-1 200 m | 48.92 | 3 QF | 48.55 | 5 | Did not advance | | | |
| Maike Jakob | C-1 200 m | 48.67 | 6 QF | 51.40 | 6 | Did not advance | | | |
| Lisa Jahn; Hedi Kliemke | C-2 500 m | 2:01.15 | 5 QF | 1:56.56 | 4 FB | Did not advance | | 1:56.48 | 9 |

Qualification Legend: FA = Qualify to final (medal); FB = Qualify to final B (non-medal)

== Cycling ==
=== Road ===
Germany entered five road cyclists (two male and three female). Germany qualified two male and three female through the UCI Nation Ranking and 2023 World Championships in Glasgow, Great Britain.

| Athlete | Event | Time | Rank |
|---|---|---|---|
| Nils Politt | Men's road race | 6:39:29 | 70 |
| Maximilian Schachmann | Men's road race | 6:21:54 | 28 |
| Maximilian Schachmann | Men's time trial | 37:50.71 | 9 |
| Franziska Koch | Women's road race | 4:07:16 | 40 |
| Liane Lippert | Women's road race | 4:03:27 | 16 |
| Antonia Niedermaier | Women's road race | 4:04:23 | 32 |
| Mieke Kröger | Women's time trial | 42:28.12 | 13 |
| Antonia Niedermaier | Women's time trial | 42:53.79 | 15 |

=== Track ===
Germany obtained a full spots for men's and women's track events, following the release of the final UCI Olympic rankings.

Sprint

| Athlete | Event | Qualification | | Round 1 | Repechage 1 | Round 2 | Repechage 2 | Round 3 | Repechage 3 | Quarterfinals | Semifinals | Finals / BM | |
| Athlete | Event | Time Speed (km/h) | Rank | Opposition Time Speed (km/h) | Opposition Time Speed (km/h) | Opposition Time Speed (km/h) | Opposition Time Speed (km/h) | Opposition Time Speed (km/h) | Opposition Time Speed (km/h) | Opposition Time | Opposition Time | Opposition Time | Rank |
|---|---|---|---|---|---|---|---|---|---|---|---|---|---|
| Maximilian Dörnbach | Men's sprint | 9.655; 74.573 | 24 Q | Lavreysen (NED); L | Obara (JPN); Vigier (FRA); L | Did not advance | | | | | | | |
| Luca Spiegel | Men's sprint | 9.479; 75.957 | 15 Q | Awang (MAS); L | Tjon En Fa (SUR); Zhou (CHN); L | Did not advance | | | | | | | |
| Lea Sophie Friedrich | Women's sprint | 10.029 WR; 71.792 | 1 Q | Nicolaes (BEL); W 10.997; 65.472 | Bye | Genest (CAN); W 10.671; 67.473 | Bye | Bayona (COL); W 10.716; 67.189 | Bye | Mitchell (CAN); W 10.774, W 10.684 | van de Wouw (NED); L, W 10.718, W 10.721 | Andrews (NZL); L, L | 2nd place, silver medalist(s) |
| Emma Hinze | Women's sprint | 10.198; 70.602 | 6 Q | Verdugo (MEX); W 10.928; 65.886 | Bye | Clonan (AUS); W 10.886; 66.140 | Bye | Sato (JPN); W 10.838; 66.433 | Bye | Andrews (NZL); L, L | Did not advance | 5th place final Mitchell (CAN); Bayona (COL); Capewell (GBR); L | 6 |

Team sprint

| Athlete | Event | Qualification | | Round 1 | | Final | |
| Athlete | Event | Time Speed (km/h) | Rank | Opposition Time Speed (km/h) | Rank | Opposition Time Speed (km/h) | Rank |
|---|---|---|---|---|---|---|---|
| Stefan Bötticher; Maximilian Dörnbach; Luca Spiegel | Men's team sprint | 43.009; 62.778 | 7 | Great Britain; 42.348; 63.757 | 4 | Japan; 42.280; 63.860 | 6 |
| Lea Sophie Friedrich; Pauline Grabosch; Emma Hinze | Women's team sprint | 45.644; 59.153 | 3 | Mexico; 45.377; 59.502 | 3 FB | Netherlands; 45.400; 59.471 | 3rd place, bronze medalist(s) |

Qualification legend: FA=Gold medal final; FB=Bronze medal final

Pursuit

| Athlete | Event | Qualification | | Semifinals | | Final | |
| Athlete | Event | Time | Rank | Opponent Results | Rank | Opponent Results | Rank |
|---|---|---|---|---|---|---|---|
| Tobias Buck-Gramcko; Roger Kluge; Theo Reinhardt; Tim Torn Teutenberg | Men's team pursuit | 3:50.083 | 9 | Did not advance | | | |
| Franziska Brauße; Lisa Klein; Mieke Kröger; Laura Süßemilch | Women's team pursuit | 4:08.313 | 5 q | Canada; W 4:07.908 | 5 | France; L 4:08.349 | 6 |

Keirin

| Athlete | Event | Round 1 | Repechage | Quarterfinals | Semifinals | Final |
| Athlete | Event | Rank | Rank | Rank | Rank | Rank |
|---|---|---|---|---|---|---|
| Maximilian Dörnbach | Men's keirin | 6 R | 4 | Did not advance | | |
| Luca Spiegel | Men's keirin | 6 R | 2 Q | 4 SF | DNF FB | 9 |
| Lea Sophie Friedrich | Women's keirin | 2 QF | Bye | 1 SF | 6 FB | 7 |
| Emma Hinze | Women's keirin | 1 QF | Bye | 2 SF | 3 FA | 5 |

Omnium

| Athlete | Event | Scratch race | | Tempo race | | Elimination race | | Points race | | Total | |
| Athlete | Event | Rank | Points | Rank | Points | Rank | Points | Rank | Points | Rank | Points |
|---|---|---|---|---|---|---|---|---|---|---|---|
| Tim Torn Teutenberg | Men's omnium | 10 | 22 | 3 | 36 | 3 | 34 | 12 | 4 | 7 | 98 |
| Franziska Brauße | Women's omnium | 18 | 6 | 5 | 32 | 22 | 1 | 18 | 2 | 18 | 41 |

Madison

| Athlete | Event | Points | Laps | Rank |
|---|---|---|---|---|
| Roger Kluge; Theo Reinhardt | Men's Madison | 23 | 0 | 6 |
| Franziska Brauße; Lena Reißner | Women's Madison | 0 | 0 | 13 |

=== Mountain biking ===
German mountain bikers qualified for two men's and one women's quota places into the Olympic cross-country race, as a result of the nation's sixth-place finish for men and ninth-place finish for women respectively, in the UCI Olympic Ranking List of 28 May 2024.

| Athlete | Event | Time | Rank |
|---|---|---|---|
| Julian Schelb | Men's cross-country | 1:29:08 | 15 |
| Luca Schwarzbauer | Men's cross-country | 1:29:10 | 16 |
| Nina Benz | Women's cross-country | 1:33:43 | 16 |

=== BMX ===
==== Freestyle ====
Germany received one quota spot for Women's BMX freestyle at the Olympics, as a result of being the 2nd best non-qualified NOC at the 2022 UCI Urban Cycling World Championships.

| Athlete | Event | Qualification | | Final | |
| Athlete | Event | Points | Rank | Points | Rank |
|---|---|---|---|---|---|
| Kim Lea Müller | Women's | 77.95 | 12 | Did not advance | |

==== Race ====
Germany qualified a men's quota in BMX racing after getting the unused host country quota as the 11th-ranked country in the BMX Olympic ranking and a women's quota via the 2023 UCI Cycling World Championships.

| Athlete | Event | Quarterfinal | | Semifinal | | Final | |
| Athlete | Event | Points | Rank | Points | Rank | Result | Rank |
|---|---|---|---|---|---|---|---|
| Philip Schaub | Men's | 20 | 21 | Did not advance | | | |
| Alina Beck | Women's | 20 | 21 | Did not advance | | | |

== Diving ==
German divers secured six quota places in their respective events for Paris 2024. Two of them successfully won gold medals each in the men's individual springboard and platform for Paris 2024, following their successful gold-medal triumphs at the 2023 European Games in Rzeszów, Poland;. two spots were awarded to the female German divers after advancing to the top twelve final in the women's individual platform at the 2023 World Aquatics Championships in Fukuoka, Japan; and two more spots awarded through synchronized men's platform and synchronized women's springboard after becoming the four highest synchronized divers, not yet qualified, at the 2024 World Aquatics Championships in Doha, Qatar.

| Athlete | Event | Preliminary | | Semifinal | | Final | |
| Athlete | Event | Points | Rank | Points | Rank | Points | Rank |
|---|---|---|---|---|---|---|---|
| Lars Rüdiger | Men's 3 m springboard | 301.15 | 25 | Did not advance | | | |
| Moritz Wesemann | Men's 3 m springboard | 398.70 | 9 Q | 433.00 | 8 Q | 363.65 | 12 |
| Timo Barthel | Men's 10 m platform | 402.65 | 12 Q | 411.50 | 9 Q | 446.20 | 6 |
| Timo Barthel; Jaden Eikermann | Men's 10 m synchronized platform | —N/a | | | | 364.41 | 7 |
| Jette Müller | Women's 3 m springboard | 262.85 | 20 | Did not advance | | | |
| Saskia Oettinghaus | Women's 3 m springboard | 279.35 | 15 Q | 286.75 | 9 Q | 297.35 | 8 |
| Lena Hentschel; Jette Müller | Women's 3 m synchronized springboard | —N/a | | | | 288.69 | 6 |
| Pauline Pfeif | Women's 10 m platform | 264.15 | 21 | Did not advance | | | |
| Christina Wassen | Women's 10 m platform | 303.20 | 7 Q | 255.55 | 17 | Did not advance | |

== Equestrian ==
Germany entered a full squad of equestrian riders each to the team dressage, eventing, and jumping competitions through a top-seven finish in dressage and top-five in jumping the 2022 FEI World Championships in Herning, Denmark, and through a top-six finish at the Eventing Worlds on the same year in Pratoni del Vivaro, Italy.

=== Dressage ===
| Athlete | Horse | Event | Grand Prix | | Grand Prix Special | | Grand Prix Freestyle | | Overall | |
| Athlete | Horse | Event | Score | Rank | Score | Rank | Technical | Artistic | Score | Rank |
|---|---|---|---|---|---|---|---|---|---|---|
| Jessica von Bredow-Werndl | Dalera | Individual | 82.065 | 1 Q | —N/a | | 82.357 | 97.829 | 90.093 | 1st place, gold medalist(s) |
| Frederic Wandres | Bluetooth | Individual | 76.118 | 10 Q | —N/a | | 75.214 | 87.486 | 81.350 | 13 |
| Isabell Werth | Wendy | Individual | 78.913 | 3 Q | —N/a | | 81.714 | 97.514 | 89.614 | 2nd place, silver medalist(s) |
| Jessica von Bredow-Werndl; Frederic Wandres; Isabell Werth | See above | Team | 237.546 | 1 Q | 235.790 | 1 | —N/a | | 235.790 | 1st place, gold medalist(s) |

Qualification Legend: Q = Qualified for the final based on position in group; q = Qualified for the final based on overall position

=== Eventing ===
| Athlete | Horse | Event | Dressage | | Cross-country | | | Jumping | | | | | | Total | |
| Athlete | Horse | Event | Dressage | | Cross-country | | | Qualifier | | | Final | | | Total | |
| Athlete | Horse | Event | Penalties | Rank | Penalties | Total | Rank | Penalties | Total | Rank | Penalties | Total | Rank | Penalties | Rank |
|---|---|---|---|---|---|---|---|---|---|---|---|---|---|---|---|
| Michael Jung | Chipmunk | Individual | 17.80 | 2 | 0 | 17.80 | 1 | 4.00 | 21.80 | 1 Q | 0 | 21.80 | 1 | 21.80 | 1st place, gold medalist(s) |
| Julia Krajewski | Nickel | Individual | 26.90 | 15 | 4.80 | 32.10 | 14 | 0.40 | 32.10 | 11 Q | 0 | 32.10 | 11 | 32.10 | 10 |
| Christoph Wahler | Carjatan | Individual | 29.40 | 21 | 200 | EL | EL | Did not advance | | | | | | | |
| Julia Krajewski; Michael Jung; Christoph Wahler | See above | Team | 74.10 | 2 | 204.80 | 278.90 | 14 | 4.40 | 283.30 | 14 | —N/a | | | 283.30 | 14 |

=== Jumping ===
| Athlete | Horse | Event | Qualification | | Final | | | Jump-Off | | |
| Athlete | Horse | Event | Penalties | Rank | Penalties | Time | Rank | Penalties | Time | Rank |
|---|---|---|---|---|---|---|---|---|---|---|
| Philipp Weishaupt | Zineday | Individual | 4 | 30 Q | 5 | 84.14 | 12 | Did not advance | | |
| Christian Kukuk | Checker 47 | Individual | 4 | 24 Q | 0 | 82.38 | 1 Q | 0 | 38.34 | 1st place, gold medalist(s) |
| Richard Vogel | United Touch S | Individual | 12 | 55 | Did not advance | | | | | |
| Philipp Weishaupt; Christian Kukuk; Richard Vogel | See above | Team | 0 | 1 Q | 8 | 229.57 | 5 | —N/a | | |

== Fencing ==
Germany entered two fencers into the Olympic competition, with Matyas Szabo and Anne Sauer claiming a spot as one of the two highest-ranked fencers vying for qualification from Europe in the FIE Adjusted Official Rankings.

| Athlete | Event | Round of 32 | Round of 16 | Quarterfinal | Semifinal | Final / BM | |
| Athlete | Event | Opposition Score | Opposition Score | Opposition Score | Opposition Score | Opposition Score | Rank |
|---|---|---|---|---|---|---|---|
| Matyas Szabo | Men's sabre | Al-Shamlan (KUW); W 15–6 | Patrice (FRA); W 15–13 | El-Sissy (EGY); L 14–15 | Did not advance | | 5 |
| Anne Sauer | Women's foil | Hamza (EGY); W 15–3 | Chan (HKG); W 15–8 | Volpi (ITA); L 12–15 | Did not advance | | 5 |

== Field hockey ==
Summary

Key:

- FT – After full-time.
- P – Match decided by penalty-shootout.

| Team | Event | Group stage | | | | | | Quarterfinal | Semifinal | Final | |
| Team | Event | Opposition Score | Opposition Score | Opposition Score | Opposition Score | Opposition Score | Rank | Opposition Score | Opposition Score | Opposition Score | Rank |
|---|---|---|---|---|---|---|---|---|---|---|---|
| Germany men's | Men's tournament | France; W 8–2 | Spain; L 0–2 | South Africa; W 5–1 | Netherlands; W 1–0 | Great Britain; W 2–1 | 1 Q | Argentina; W 3–2 | India; W 3–2 | Netherlands; L 1–3^{P} FT: 1–1 | 2nd place, silver medalist(s) |
| Germany women's | Women's tournament | Japan; W 2–0 | Netherlands; L 1–2 | France; W 5–1 | China; W 4–2 | Belgium; L 0–2 | 3 Q | Argentina; L 0–2^{P} FT: 1–1 | Did not advance | | |

=== Men's tournament ===
Germany men's national field hockey team qualified for the Olympics after a top three finish at the 2024 FIH Olympic Qualifiers in Muscat, Oman.

Team roster

Germany announced their squad on 14 June 2024.

Head coach: André Henning

| No. | Pos. | Player | Date of birth (age) | Caps | Club |
|---|---|---|---|---|---|
| 2 | DF | Mathias Müller | 3 April 1992 (aged 32) | 175 | (Germany) Hamburger Polo Club |
| 3 | MF | Mats Grambusch (Captain) | 4 November 1992 (aged 31) | 205 | (Germany) Rot-Weiss Köln |
| 4 | DF | Lukas Windfeder | 11 May 1995 (aged 29) | 157 | (Germany) Uhlenhorst Mülheim |
| 9 | FW | Niklas Wellen | 14 December 1994 (aged 29) | 205 | (Germany) Crefelder HTC |
| 10 | DF | Johannes Große | 7 January 1997 (aged 27) | 114 | (Germany) Rot-Weiss Köln |
| 11 | FW | Thies Prinz | 7 July 1998 (aged 26) | 74 | (Germany) Rot-Weiss Köln |
| 13 | MF | Paul-Philipp Kaufmann | 21 June 1996 (aged 28) | 50 | (Netherlands) Den Bosch |
| 14 | DF | Teo Hinrichs | 17 September 1999 (aged 24) | 65 | (Germany) Mannheimer HC |
| 15 | DF | Tom Grambusch | 4 August 1995 (aged 28) | 118 | (Germany) Rot-Weiss Köln |
| 16 | DF | Gonzalo Peillat | 12 August 1992 (aged 31) | 52 | (Germany) Mannheimer HC |
| 17 | FW | Christopher Rühr | 19 December 1993 (aged 30) | 189 | (Germany) Rot-Weiss Köln |
| 19 | FW | Justus Weigand | 20 April 2000 (aged 24) | 54 | (Germany) Mannheimer HC |
| 22 | FW | Marco Miltkau | 18 August 1990 (aged 33) | 148 | (Netherlands) Klein Zwitserland |
| 23 | MF | Martin Zwicker | 27 February 1987 (aged 37) | 318 | (Germany) Berliner HC |
| 25 | MF | Hannes Müller | 18 May 2000 (aged 24) | 56 | (Germany) UHC Hamburg |
| 29 | FW | Malte Hellwig | 23 October 1997 (aged 26) | 54 | (Germany) Uhlenhorst Mülheim |
| 44 | DF | Moritz Ludwig | 14 September 2001 (aged 22) | 50 | (Germany) Uhlenhorst Mülheim |
| 74 | GK | Jean Danneberg | 8 November 2002 (aged 21) | 28 | (Germany) Rot-Weiss Köln |

Reserves:

- Malte Hellwig
- Paul-Philipp Kaufmann
- Alexander Stadler (GK)

Group play

| Pos | Team | Pld | W | D | L | GF | GA | GD | Pts | Qualification |
|---|---|---|---|---|---|---|---|---|---|---|
| 1 | Germany | 5 | 4 | 0 | 1 | 16 | 6 | +10 | 12 | Advance to quarter-finals |
| 2 | Netherlands | 5 | 3 | 1 | 1 | 16 | 9 | +7 | 10 | Advance to quarter-finals |
| 3 | Great Britain | 5 | 2 | 2 | 1 | 11 | 7 | +4 | 8 | Advance to quarter-finals |
| 4 | Spain | 5 | 2 | 1 | 2 | 11 | 12 | −1 | 7 | Advance to quarter-finals |
| 5 | South Africa | 5 | 1 | 1 | 3 | 11 | 17 | −6 | 4 | |
| 6 | France (H) | 5 | 0 | 1 | 4 | 8 | 22 | −14 | 1 | |

Source: FIH
Rules for classification: 1) points; 2) matches won; 3) goal difference; 4) goals for; 5) head-to-head result; 6) field goals scored.
(H) Hosts

27 July 2024
17:00
v

| Germany | 8–2 | France |
|---|---|---|
| Weigand 1', 44'; Rühr 7'; Prinz 19'; M. Grambusch 21'; T. Grambusch 22'; Wellen 33', 49' | Report | Masson 15+'; Charlet 59' |

Pitch 1
Umpires:
Zeke Newman (AUS)
Gareth Greenfield (NZL)

28 July 2024
17:00
v

| Germany | 0–2 | Spain |
|---|---|---|
| | Report | Basterra 32'; Cunill 53' |

Pitch 1
Umpires:
Jonas van 't Hek (NED)
Martin Madden (GBR)

30 July 2024
10:30
v

| South Africa | 1–5 | Germany |
|---|---|---|
| Guise-Brown 35' | Report | Peillat 1', 39'; Rühr 15'; Weigand 17'; M. Grambusch 58' |

Pitch 2
Umpires:
Dan Barstow (GBR)
Raghu Prasad (IND)

31 July 2024
17:30
v

| Germany | 1–0 | Netherlands |
|---|---|---|
| Wellen 3' | Report |

Pitch 2
Umpires:
Martin Madden (GBR)
David Tomlinson (NZL)

2 August 2024
20:15
v

| Great Britain | 1–2 | Germany |
|---|---|---|
| Furlong 49' | Report | Rühr 19', 25' |

Pitch 2
Umpires:
Coen van Bunge (NED)
Gareth Greenfield (NZL)

Quarterfinal

4 August 2024
20:00
v

| Germany | 3–2 | Argentina |
|---|---|---|
| Hinrichs 9'; Peillat 24'; Weigand 54' | Report | Casella 11'; Mazilli 48' |

Pitch 1
Umpires:
Zeke Newman (AUS)
David Tomlinson (NZL)

Semifinal

6 August 2024
19:00
v

| Germany | 3–2 | India |
|---|---|---|
| Peillat 18'; Rühr 27'; Miltkau 54' | Report | Harmanpreet 7'; Sukhjeet 36' |

Pitch 1
Umpires:
Coen van Bunge (NED)
Gareth Greenfield (NZL)

Gold medal game

8 August 2024
19:00
v

| (silver) Germany | 1–1 | Netherlands (gold) |
|---|---|---|
| Prinz 50' | Report; Shootout report | Brinkman 46' |
Penalties
| Wellen (penalty shoot-out missed); H. Müller (penalty shoot-out missed); Prinz (penalty shoot-out missed); Weigand (penalty shoot-out scored) | 1–3 | (penalty shoot-out missed) De Geus; (penalty shoot-out missed) De Mol; (penalty shoot-out scored) Brinkman; (penalty shoot-out scored) Van Dam; (penalty shoot-out scored) Telgenkamp |

Stade Yves-du-Manoir
Attendance: 15,000
Umpires:
Martin Madden (GBR)
Steve Rogers (AUS)

=== Women's tournament ===
Germany women's national field hockey team qualified for the Olympics after a top three finish at the 2024 FIH Olympic Qualifiers in Ranchi, India.

Team roster

The squad was announced on 13 June 2024.

Head coach: Valentin Altenburg

| No. | Pos. | Player | Date of birth (age) | Caps | Goals | Club |
|---|---|---|---|---|---|---|
| 2 | DF | Kira Horn | 12 February 1995 (aged 29) | 87 | 3 | (Germany) Club an der Alster |
| 3 | MF | Amelie Wortmann | 21 October 1996 (aged 27) | 108 | 5 | (Germany) UHC Hamburg |
| 4 | MF | Nike Lorenz (Captain) | 12 March 1997 (aged 27) | 178 | 78 | (Germany) Rot-Weiss Köln |
| 5 | MF | Selin Oruz | 5 February 1997 (aged 27) | 160 | 7 | (Germany) Düsseldorfer HC |
| 6 | DF | Benedetta Wenzel | 31 March 1997 (aged 27) | 50 | 2 | (Germany) Berliner HC |
| 8 | MF | Anne Schröder | 11 September 1994 (aged 29) | 207 | 31 | (Germany) Club an der Alster |
| 10 | FW | Lisa Nolte | 5 February 2001 (aged 23) | 34 | 6 | (Germany) Düsseldorfer HC |
| 11 | MF | Lena Micheel | 29 April 1998 (aged 26) | 108 | 20 | (Germany) UHC Hamburg |
| 12 | FW | Charlotte Stapenhorst | 15 June 1995 (aged 29) | 169 | 84 | (Germany) Zehlendorfer Wespen |
| 15 | GK | Nathalie Kubalski | 3 September 1993 (aged 30) | 49 | 0 | (Netherlands) Nijmegen |
| 16 | MF | Sonja Zimmermann | 15 June 1999 (aged 25) | 98 | 27 | (Netherlands) Amsterdam |
| 22 | MF | Cécile Pieper | 31 August 1994 (aged 29) | 191 | | |
| 23 | | Emma Davidsmeyer | 30 March 1999 (aged 25) | 39 | | |
| 25 | DF | Viktoria Huse | 24 October 1995 (aged 28) | 117 | 20 | (Germany) Club an der Alster |
| 26 | MF | Felicia Wiedermann | 28 January 2002 (aged 22) | 21 | 3 | (Germany) Rot-Weiss Köln |
| 27 | DF | Stine Kurz | 20 May 2000 (aged 24) | 34 | 3 | (Germany) Mannheimer HC |
| 28 | FW | Jette Fleschütz | 23 October 2002 (aged 21) | 60 | 18 | (Germany) Großflottbeker THGC |
| 31 | DF | Linnea Weidemann | 15 September 2003 (aged 20) | 43 | 0 | (Germany) Berliner HC |

Group play

| Pos | Team | Pld | W | D | L | GF | GA | GD | Pts | Qualification |
|---|---|---|---|---|---|---|---|---|---|---|
| 1 | Netherlands | 5 | 5 | 0 | 0 | 19 | 5 | +14 | 15 | Quarter-finals |
| 2 | Belgium | 5 | 4 | 0 | 1 | 13 | 4 | +9 | 12 | Quarter-finals |
| 3 | Germany | 5 | 3 | 0 | 2 | 12 | 7 | +5 | 9 | Quarter-finals |
| 4 | China | 5 | 2 | 0 | 3 | 15 | 10 | +5 | 6 | Quarter-finals |
| 5 | Japan | 5 | 1 | 0 | 4 | 2 | 15 | −13 | 3 | |
| 6 | France (H) | 5 | 0 | 0 | 5 | 4 | 24 | −20 | 0 | |

Source: FIH
Rules for classification: 1) points; 2) matches won; 3) goal difference; 4) goals for; 5) head-to-head result; 6) field goals scored.
(H) Hosts

28 July 2024
10:30
v

| Germany | 2–0 | Japan |
|---|---|---|
| Stapenhorst 12'; Lorenz 56' | Report |

Pitch 2
Umpires:
Alison Keogh (IRE)
Sarah Wilson (GBR)

29 July 2024
19:45
v

| Germany | 1–2 | Netherlands |
|---|---|---|
| Stapenhorst 44' | Report | Jansen 50'; Veen 54' |

Pitch 1
Umpires:
Amber Church (NZL)
Aleisha Neumann (AUS)

31 July 2024
12:45
v

| France | 1–5 | Germany |
|---|---|---|
| Lhopital 51' | Report | Lorenz 3', 52', 53'; Stapenhorst 11'; Wortmann 28' |

Pitch 1
Umpires:
Annelize Rostron (RSA)
Emi Yamada (JPN)

2 August 2024
10:00
v

| China | 2–4 | Germany |
|---|---|---|
| Dan 36'; Zou 55' | Report | Lorenz 12', 49'; Stapenhorst 17', 18' |

Pitch 1
Umpires:
Sarah Wilson (GBR)
Annelize Rostron (RSA)

3 August 2024
19:45
v

| Germany | 0–2 | Belgium |
|---|---|---|
| | Report | Struijk 13'; Ballenghien 17' |

Pitch 1
Umpires:
Irene Presenqui (ARG)
Wanri Venter (RSA)

Quarterfinal

5 August 2024
12:30
v

| Argentina | 1–1 | Germany |
|---|---|---|
| Jankunas 59' | Report; Penalty shootout report | Huse 57' |
Penalties
| Casas (penalty shoot-out missed); Jankunas (penalty shoot-out scored); Díaz (penalty shoot-out scored) | 2–0 | (penalty shoot-out missed) Weidemann; (penalty shoot-out missed) Huse; (penalty shoot-out missed) Schröder; (penalty shoot-out missed) Zimmermann |

Pitch 1
Umpires:
Laurine Delforge (BEL)
Aleisha Neumann (AUS)

== Football ==
Summary

Key:

- a.e.t. – After extra time.
- P – Match decided by penalty-shootout.

| Team | Event | Group stage | | | | Quarterfinal | Semifinal | Bronze medal match | |
| Team | Event | Opposition Score | Opposition Score | Opposition Score | Rank | Opposition Score | Opposition Score | Opposition Score | Rank |
|---|---|---|---|---|---|---|---|---|---|
| Germany women's | Women's tournament | Australia; W 3–0 | United States; L 1–4 | Zambia; W 4–1 | 2 Q | Canada; W 4–2^{P} 0–0 (a.e.t.) | United States; L 0–1 (a.e.t.) | Spain; W 1–0 | 3rd place, bronze medalist(s) |

=== Women's tournament ===
For the first time since 2016, Germany women's football team qualified for the Olympics by winning the third place play-off match of the 2024 UEFA Women's Nations League Finals in Heerenveen, Netherlands.

Team roster

Germany named a squad of 18 players and 4 alternates for the tournament on 3 July 2024. On 17 July, Lena Oberdorf withdrew from the squad due to injury and was replaced by Janina Minge. Pia-Sophie Wolter was added to the alternate list.

Interim head coach: Horst Hrubesch

| No. | Pos. | Player | Date of birth (age) | Caps | Goals | Club |
|---|---|---|---|---|---|---|
| 1 | GK | Merle Frohms | 28 January 1995 (aged 29) | 52 | 0 | (German Football Association) VfL Wolfsburg |
| 2 | DF | Sarai Linder | 26 October 1999 (aged 24) | 16 | 0 | (German Football Association) TSG Hoffenheim |
| 3 | DF | Kathrin Hendrich | 6 April 1992 (aged 32) | 75 | 5 | (German Football Association) VfL Wolfsburg |
| 4 | DF | Bibiane Schulze | 12 November 1998 (aged 25) | 4 | 0 | (Royal Spanish Football Federation) Athletic Bilbao |
| 5 | DF | Marina Hegering | 17 April 1990 (aged 34) | 37 | 4 | (German Football Association) VfL Wolfsburg |
| 6 | MF | Janina Minge | 11 June 1999 (aged 25) | 5 | 1 | (German Football Association) SC Freiburg |
| 7 | FW | Lea Schüller | 12 November 1997 (aged 26) | 62 | 42 | (German Football Association) Bayern Munich |
| 8 | MF | Sydney Lohmann | 19 June 2000 (aged 24) | 31 | 4 | (German Football Association) Bayern Munich |
| 9 | MF | Sjoeke Nüsken | 22 January 2001 (aged 23) | 30 | 3 | (The Football Association) Chelsea |
| 10 | FW | Laura Freigang | 1 February 1998 (aged 26) | 29 | 12 | (German Football Association) Eintracht Frankfurt |
| 11 | FW | Alexandra Popp | 6 April 1991 (aged 33) | 139 | 67 | (German Football Association) VfL Wolfsburg |
| 12 | GK | Ann-Katrin Berger | 9 October 1990 (aged 33) | 10 | 0 | (United States Soccer Federation) Gotham FC |
| 13 | DF | Sara Doorsoun | 17 November 1991 (aged 32) | 53 | 1 | (German Football Association) Eintracht Frankfurt |
| 14 | MF | Elisa Senß | 1 October 1997 (aged 26) | 7 | 0 | (German Football Association) Bayer Leverkusen |
| 15 | DF | Giulia Gwinn | 2 July 1999 (aged 25) | 47 | 10 | (German Football Association) Bayern Munich |
| 16 | MF | Jule Brand | 16 October 2002 (aged 21) | 47 | 8 | (German Football Association) VfL Wolfsburg |
| 17 | FW | Klara Bühl | 7 December 2000 (aged 23) | 52 | 25 | (German Football Association) Bayern Munich |
| 18 | FW | Vivien Endemann | 7 August 2001 (aged 22) | 6 | 0 | (German Football Association) VfL Wolfsburg |
| 19 | DF | Felicitas Rauch | 30 April 1996 (aged 28) | 40 | 4 | (United States Soccer Federation) North Carolina Courage |
| 21 | FW | Nicole Anyomi | 10 February 2000 (aged 24) | 25 | 2 | (German Football Association) Eintracht Frankfurt |

Group play

| Pos | Team | Pld | W | D | L | GF | GA | GD | Pts | Qualification |
|---|---|---|---|---|---|---|---|---|---|---|
| 1 | United States | 3 | 3 | 0 | 0 | 9 | 2 | +7 | 9 | Advance to knockout stage |
| 2 | Germany | 3 | 2 | 0 | 1 | 8 | 5 | +3 | 6 | Advance to knockout stage |
| 3 | Australia | 3 | 1 | 0 | 2 | 7 | 10 | −3 | 3 | |
| 4 | Zambia | 3 | 0 | 0 | 3 | 6 | 13 | −7 | 0 | |

Source: FIFA
Rules for classification: Group stage tiebreakers
25 July 2024
19:00

| Germany | 3–0 | Australia |
|---|---|---|
| Hegering 24'; Schüller 64'; Brand 68' | Report |

Stade de Marseille, Marseille
Attendance: 9,731
Referee: Katia García (Mexico)

28 July 2024
21:00

| United States | 4–1 | Germany |
|---|---|---|
| Smith 11', 44'; Swanson 26'; Williams 89' | Report | Gwinn 22' |

Stade de Marseille, Marseille
Attendance: 12,845
Referee: Yael Falcón (Argentina)

31 July 2024
19:00

| Zambia | 1–4 | Germany |
|---|---|---|
| B. Banda 49' | Report | Schüller 10', 61'; Bühl 47'; Senß 90+5' |

Stade Geoffroy-Guichard, Saint-Étienne
Attendance: 2,642
Referee: Yoshimi Yamashita (Japan)

Quarterfinals

3 August 2024
19:00

| Canada | 0–0 (a.e.t.) | Germany |
|---|---|---|
| | Report |
Penalties
| Quinn (penalty scored); Lawrence (penalty missed); Leon (penalty missed); Beckie (penalty scored) | 2–4 | (penalty scored) Gwinn; (penalty scored) Minge; (penalty missed) Lohmann; (penalty scored) Rauch; (penalty scored) Berger |

Stade de Marseille, Marseille
Attendance: 12,517
Referee: Edina Alves Batista (Brazil)

Semifinals

6 August 2024
18:00

| United States | 1–0 (a.e.t.) | Germany |
|---|---|---|
| Smith 95' | Report |

Stade de Lyon, Décines-Charpieu
Attendance: 11,716
Referee: Bouchra Karboubi (Morocco)

Bronze medal match

9 August 2024
15:00

| Spain | 0–1 | Germany |
|---|---|---|
| | Report | Gwinn 65' (pen.) |

Stade de Lyon, Décines-Charpieu
Attendance: 10,995
Referee: Katia García (Mexico)

== Golf ==
Germany entered four golfers into the Olympic tournament. All of them qualified directly for the games in the men's and women's individual competitions, based on their respective world ranking performances, as the top 60 ranked players, on the IGF World Rankings.

| Athlete | Event | Round 1 | Round 2 | Round 3 | Round 4 | Total | | |
| Athlete | Event | Score | Score | Score | Score | Score | Par | Rank |
|---|---|---|---|---|---|---|---|---|
| Stephan Jäger | Men's | 71 | 64 | 72 | 72 | 279 | −5 | T26 |
| Matti Schmid | Men's | 68 | 75 | 69 | 67 | 279 | −5 | T26 |
| Esther Henseleit | Women's | 72 | 73 | 69 | 66 | 280 | −8 | 2nd place, silver medalist(s) |
| Alexandra Försterling | Women's | 76 | 75 | 71 | 70 | 292 | +4 | 35 |

== Gymnastics ==
=== Artistic ===
Germany fielded a squad of five male gymnasts and three female gymnasts for Paris. All of those gymnasts qualified for the games by virtue of the results at the 2023 World Championships in Antwerp, Belgium.

Men
Team

| Athlete | Event | Qualification | | | | | | | | Final | | | | | | | |
| Athlete | Event | Apparatus | | | | | | Total | Rank | Apparatus | | | | | | Total | Rank |
| Athlete | Event | F | PH | R | V | PB | HB | Total | Rank | F | PH | R | V | PB | HB | Total | Rank |
|---|---|---|---|---|---|---|---|---|---|---|---|---|---|---|---|---|---|
| Pascal Brendel | Team | 13.600 | ~~12.233~~ | 13.000 | 13.900 | ~~13.133~~ | 13.466 | 79.332 | 36 | Did not advance | | | | | | | |
| Lukas Dauser | Team | 13.233 | —N/a | | | 15.166 Q | —N/a | | | Did not advance | | | | | | | |
| Nils Dunkel | Team | ~~12.600~~ | 14.566 | 13.700 | ~~13.600~~ | 13.966 | 12.800 | 81.232 | 24 Q | Did not advance | | | | | | | |
| Timo Eder | Team | 13.400 | 12.800 | 13.066 | 13.900 | 13.366 | ~~12.266~~ | 78.798 | 39 | Did not advance | | | | | | | |
| Andreas Toba | Team | —N/a | 13.066 | ~~12.966~~ | 14.300 | —N/a | 14.100 | —N/a | | Did not advance | | | | | | | |
| Total | Team | 40.233 | 40.432 | 39.766 | 42.100 | 42.498 | 40.366 | 245.395 | 11 | Did not advance | | | | | | | |

Individual finals

| Athlete | Event | Qualification | | | | | | | | Final | | | | | | | |
| Athlete | Event | Apparatus | | | | | | Total | Rank | Apparatus | | | | | | Total | Rank |
| Athlete | Event | F | PH | R | V | PB | HB | Total | Rank | F | PH | R | V | PB | HB | Total | Rank |
|---|---|---|---|---|---|---|---|---|---|---|---|---|---|---|---|---|---|
| Lukas Dauser | Parallel bars | —N/a | | | | 15.166 | —N/a | 15.166 | 5 Q | —N/a | | | | 13.700 | —N/a | 13.700 | 7 |
| Nils Dunkel | All-around | 12.600 | 14.566 | 13.700 | 13.600 | 13.966 | 12.800 | 81.232 | 24 Q | 13.333 | 14.466 | 13.566 | 13.700 | 13.466 | 13.166 | 81.697 | 18 |

Women
Individual

| Athlete | Event | Qualification | | | | | | Final | | | | | |
| Athlete | Event | Apparatus | | | | Total | Rank | Apparatus | | | | Total | Rank |
| Athlete | Event | V | UB | BB | F | Total | Rank | V | UB | BB | F | Total | Rank |
|---|---|---|---|---|---|---|---|---|---|---|---|---|---|
| Helen Kevric | All-around | 14.066 | 14.600 | 12.133 | 13.066 | 53.865 | 15 Q | 13.866 | 14.466 | 13.400 | 12.866 | 54.598 | 8 |
| Helen Kevric | Uneven bars | —N/a | 14.600 | —N/a | | 14.600 | 8 Q | —N/a | 14.566 | —N/a | | 14.566 | 6 |
| Pauline Schäfer | All-around | —N/a | | 13.366 | 12.366 | —N/a | | Did not advance | | | | | |
| Sarah Voss | All-around | 14.000 | 13.466 | 12.233 | 12.866 | 52.565 | 25 Q | 12.500 | 12.333 | 12.300 | 12.866 | 49.999 | 24 |

=== Rhythmic ===
Germany entered one rhythmic gymnast into the individual all-around tournament by winning a silver medal and securing one of the three available berths at the 2022 World Championships in Sofia, Bulgaria.

| Athlete | Event | Qualification | | | | | | Final | | | | | |
| Athlete | Event | Hoop | Ball | Clubs | Ribbon | Total | Rank | Hoop | Ball | Clubs | Ribbon | Total | Rank |
|---|---|---|---|---|---|---|---|---|---|---|---|---|---|
| Margarita Kolosov | Individual | 34.550 | 33.000 | 33.800 | 30.150 | 131.500 | 5 Q | 34.600 | 34.150 | 33.950 | 32.550 | 135.250 | 4 |
| Darja Varfolomeev | Individual | 32.500 | 36.450 | 35.250 | 32.650 | 136.850 | 2 Q | 36.300 | 36.500 | 36.350 | 33.700 | 142.850 | 1st place, gold medalist(s) |

| Athletes | Event | Qualification | | | | Final | | | |
| Athletes | Event | 5 apps | 3+2 apps | Total | Rank | 5 apps. | 3+2 apps | Total | Rank |
|---|---|---|---|---|---|---|---|---|---|
| Anja Kosan; Daniella Kromm; Alina Oganesyan; Hannah Vester; Emilia Wickert | Group | 33.700 | 23.650 | 57.350 | 13 | Did not advance | | | |

=== Trampoline ===
Germany has qualified one gymnast in the men's trampoline by virtue of a top ten finish in 2024 Olympic Games Qualification Ranking list.

| Athlete | Event | Qualification | | Final | |
| Athlete | Event | Score | Rank | Score | Rank |
|---|---|---|---|---|---|
| Fabian Vogel | Men's | 56.890 | 11 | Did not advance | |

== Handball ==
Summary

Key:

- ET: After extra time
- P – Match decided by penalty-shootout.

| Team | Event | Group Stage | | | | | | Quarterfinal | Semifinal | Final / BM | |
| Team | Event | Opposition Score | Opposition Score | Opposition Score | Opposition Score | Opposition Score | Rank | Opposition Score | Opposition Score | Opposition Score | Rank |
|---|---|---|---|---|---|---|---|---|---|---|---|
| Germany men's | Men's tournament | Sweden; W 30–27 | Japan; W 37–26 | Croatia; L 26–31 | Spain; W 33–31 | Slovenia; W 36–29 | 1 Q | France; W 35–34^{ET} | Spain; W 25–24 | Denmark; L 26–39 | 2nd place, silver medalist(s) |
| Germany women's | Women's tournament | South Korea; L 22–23 | Sweden; L 28–31 | Slovenia; W 41–22 | Denmark; L 27–28 | Norway; L 18–30 | 4 Q | France; L 23–26 | Did not advance | | 8 |

=== Men's tournament ===
Germany men's national handball team qualified for the Olympics by securing a top two spot at the 2024 IHF Men's Olympic Qualification Tournaments in Hanover.

Team roster

A 17-player roster was announced on 10 June 2024. The final roster was revealed on 8 July 2024.

Head coach: (Iceland) Alfreð Gíslason

| No. | Pos. | Name | Date of birth (age) | Height | App. | Goals | Club |
|---|---|---|---|---|---|---|---|
| 1 | GK | David Späth | 29 April 2002 (aged 22) | 2.00 m | 20 | 0 | (Germany) Rhein-Neckar Löwen |
| 4 | P | Johannes Golla | 5 November 1997 (aged 26) | 1.95 m | 83 | 287 | (Germany) SG Flensburg-Handewitt |
| 7 | CB | Luca Witzke | 3 April 1999 (aged 25) | 1.91 m | 29 | 61 | (Germany) SC DHfK Leipzig |
| 11 | LB | Sebastian Heymann | 1 March 1998 (aged 26) | 1.98 m | 36 | 64 | (Germany) Rhein-Neckar Löwen |
| 14 | P | Justus Fischer | 6 February 2003 (aged 21) | 1.94 m | 14 | 11 | (Germany) TSV Hannover-Burgdorf |
| 15 | CB | Juri Knorr | 9 May 2000 (aged 24) | 1.91 m | 60 | 230 | (Germany) Rhein-Neckar Löwen |
| 18 | LB | Julian Köster | 16 March 2000 (aged 24) | 2.00 m | 50 | 119 | (Germany) VfL Gummersbach |
| 23 | RB | Renārs Uščins | 29 April 2002 (aged 22) | 1.89 m | 20 | 61 | (Germany) TSV Hannover-Burgdorf |
| 25 | RB | Kai Häfner | 10 July 1989 (aged 35) | 1.92 m | 146 | 349 | (Germany) TVB Stuttgart |
| 29 | RW | Tim Hornke | 4 August 1990 (aged 33) | 1.88 m | 22 | 57 | (Germany) SC Magdeburg |
| 33 | GK | Andreas Wolff | 3 March 1991 (aged 33) | 1.98 m | 161 | 14 | (Germany) THW Kiel |
| 34 | LW | Rune Dahmke | 10 April 1993 (aged 31) | 1.89 m | 74 | 111 | (Germany) THW Kiel |
| 36 | LW | Lukas Mertens | 22 March 1996 (aged 28) | 1.82 m | 47 | 108 | (Germany) SC Magdeburg |
| 44 | RB | Christoph Steinert | 18 January 1990 (aged 34) | 1.96 m | 48 | 87 | (Germany) HC Erlangen |
| 71 | LB | Marko Grgić | 11 September 2003 (aged 20) | 1.98 m | 4 | 8 | (Germany) ThSV Eisenach |
| 80 | P | Jannik Kohlbacher | 19 July 1995 (aged 29) | 1.93 m | 114 | 225 | (Germany) Rhein-Neckar Löwen |

Group play

| Pos | Team | Pld | W | D | L | GF | GA | GD | Pts | Qualification |
|---|---|---|---|---|---|---|---|---|---|---|
| 1 | Germany | 5 | 4 | 0 | 1 | 162 | 144 | +18 | 8 | Quarterfinals |
| 2 | Slovenia | 5 | 3 | 0 | 2 | 140 | 142 | −2 | 6 (Note: Slovenia 2 Pts, +2 GD; Spain 2 Pts, 0 GD; Sweden 2 Pts, −2 GD.) | Quarterfinals |
| 3 | Spain | 5 | 3 | 0 | 2 | 151 | 148 | +3 | 6 | Quarterfinals |
| 4 | Sweden | 5 | 3 | 0 | 2 | 158 | 139 | +19 | 6 | Quarterfinals |
| 5 | Croatia | 5 | 2 | 0 | 3 | 148 | 156 | −8 | 4 | |
| 6 | Japan | 5 | 0 | 0 | 5 | 143 | 173 | −30 | 0 | |

Source: Olympics Paris 2024 rankings
Rules for classification: 1) Points; 2) Head-to-head points; 3) Head-to-head goal difference; 4) Head-to-head goals scored; 5) Goal difference; 6) Goals scored; 7) Draw.
Notes:

| 27 July 2024; 19:00 | Germany | 30–27 | Sweden | Paris Expo Porte de Versailles, Paris; Attendance: 5,739; Referees: Hansen, Madsen (DEN) |
| 27 July 2024; 19:00 | Uščins 8 | (12–11) | Wanne 8 | Paris Expo Porte de Versailles, Paris; Attendance: 5,739; Referees: Hansen, Madsen (DEN) |
| 27 July 2024; 19:00 | 1× (suspension) 1× (red card) | Report | 2× (suspension) | Paris Expo Porte de Versailles, Paris; Attendance: 5,739; Referees: Hansen, Madsen (DEN) |

| 29 July 2024; 09:00 | Japan | 26–37 | Germany | Paris Expo Porte de Versailles, Paris; Attendance: 5,788; Referees: Bíró, Kiss (HUN) |
| 29 July 2024; 09:00 | Fujisaka 6 | (10–21) | Uščins 7 | Paris Expo Porte de Versailles, Paris; Attendance: 5,788; Referees: Bíró, Kiss (HUN) |
| 29 July 2024; 09:00 | 3× (suspension) | Report | 1× (suspension) | Paris Expo Porte de Versailles, Paris; Attendance: 5,788; Referees: Bíró, Kiss (HUN) |

| 31 July 2024; 11:00 | Croatia | 31–26 | Germany | Paris Expo Porte de Versailles, Paris; Attendance: 5,774; Referees: Horáček, Novotný (CZE) |
| 31 July 2024; 11:00 | Martinović 9 | (15–13) | Golla 8 | Paris Expo Porte de Versailles, Paris; Attendance: 5,774; Referees: Horáček, Novotný (CZE) |
| 31 July 2024; 11:00 | 1× (yellow card) 5× (suspension) 1× (red card) | Report | | Paris Expo Porte de Versailles, Paris; Attendance: 5,774; Referees: Horáček, Novotný (CZE) |

| 2 August 2024; 16:00 | Germany | 33–31 | Spain | Paris Expo Porte de Versailles, Paris; Attendance: 5,774; Referees: Nachevski, Nikolov (MKD) |
| 2 August 2024; 16:00 | Uščins 8 | (20–18) | Gómez 10 | Paris Expo Porte de Versailles, Paris; Attendance: 5,774; Referees: Nachevski, Nikolov (MKD) |
| 2 August 2024; 16:00 | 5× (suspension) | Report | 3× (suspension) | Paris Expo Porte de Versailles, Paris; Attendance: 5,774; Referees: Nachevski, Nikolov (MKD) |

| 4 August 2024; 14:00 | Germany | 36–29 | Slovenia | Paris Expo Porte de Versailles, Paris; Attendance: 5,685; Referees: Jørum, Kleven (NOR) |
| 4 August 2024; 14:00 | Häfner 7 | (23–14) | Horžen 7 | Paris Expo Porte de Versailles, Paris; Attendance: 5,685; Referees: Jørum, Kleven (NOR) |
| 4 August 2024; 14:00 | 1× (suspension) | Report | 1× (suspension) | Paris Expo Porte de Versailles, Paris; Attendance: 5,685; Referees: Jørum, Kleven (NOR) |

Quarterfinal

7 August 2024
13:30
Germany
35–34 (ET)
France
Stade Pierre-Mauroy, Lille
Attendance: 27,014
Referees: Hansen, Madsen (DEN)
Uščins 14
(14–17)
Mem 10
3× (suspension)
Report
1× (yellow card) 6× (suspension)

FT: 29–29 ET: 6–5

Semifinal

| 9 August 2024; 16:30 | Germany | 25–24 | Spain | Stade Pierre-Mauroy, Lille; Attendance: 22,745; Referees: Nachevski, Nikolov (MKD) |
| 9 August 2024; 16:30 | Uščins 6 | (12–12) | Fernández 5 | Stade Pierre-Mauroy, Lille; Attendance: 22,745; Referees: Nachevski, Nikolov (MKD) |
| 9 August 2024; 16:30 | 1× (yellow card) 1× (suspension) | Report | 1× (yellow card) 1× (suspension) | Stade Pierre-Mauroy, Lille; Attendance: 22,745; Referees: Nachevski, Nikolov (MKD) |

Gold medal game

| 11 August 2024; 13:30 | Germany | 26–39 | Denmark | Stade Pierre-Mauroy, Lille; Attendance: 27,328; Referees: Lah, Sok (SLO) |
| 11 August 2024; 13:30 | Knorr 6 | (12–21) | Gidsel 11 | Stade Pierre-Mauroy, Lille; Attendance: 27,328; Referees: Lah, Sok (SLO) |
| 11 August 2024; 13:30 | 1× (suspension) | Report | 1× (suspension) | Stade Pierre-Mauroy, Lille; Attendance: 27,328; Referees: Lah, Sok (SLO) |

=== Women's tournament ===
Germany women's national handball team qualified for the Olympics by securing a top two spot at the 2024 IHF Women's Olympic Qualification Tournaments in Neu-Ulm.

Team roster

A 21-player squad was announced on 17 May 2024. The final roster was revealed on 8 July 2024.

Head coach: Markus Gaugisch

| No. | Pos. | Name | Date of birth (age) | Height | App. | Goals | Club |
|---|---|---|---|---|---|---|---|
| 4 | CB | Alina Grijseels | 12 April 1996 (aged 28) | 1.75 m | 88 | 295 | (Romania) CSM București |
| 7 | P | Meike Schmelzer | 19 July 1993 (aged 31) | 1.79 m | 111 | 145 | (Romania) HC Dunărea Brăila |
| 9 | P | Lisa Antl | 21 June 2000 (aged 24) | 1.73 m | 52 | 75 | (Germany) Borussia Dortmund |
| 11 | LB | Xenia Smits | 22 April 1994 (aged 30) | 1.85 m | 120 | 283 | (Germany) HB Ludwigsburg |
| 20 | LB | Emily Bölk | 26 April 1998 (aged 26) | 1.82 m | 115 | 347 | (Hungary) Ferencvárosi TC |
| 23 | LB | Annika Lott | 7 December 1999 (aged 24) | 1.80 m | 28 | 47 | (France) Brest Bretagne Handball |
| 24 | GK | Sarah Wachter | 16 December 1999 (aged 24) | 1.82 m | 27 | 1 | (Germany) Borussia Dortmund |
| 27 | RB | Julia Maidhof | 13 March 1998 (aged 26) | 1.76 m | 54 | 183 | (Romania) Râmnicu Vâlcea |
| 29 | LW | Antje Döll | 3 October 1988 (aged 35) | 1.70 m | 81 | 214 | (Germany) HB Ludwigsburg |
| 30 | RW | Jenny Behrend | 20 January 1996 (aged 28) | 1.70 m | 60 | 102 | (Germany) HB Ludwigsburg |
| 42 | GK | Katharina Filter | 4 February 1999 (aged 25) | 1.80 m | 52 | 2 | (France) Brest Bretagne Handball |
| 77 | RB | Viola Leuchter | 15 June 2004 (aged 20) | 1.87 m | 19 | 48 | (Germany) HB Ludwigsburg |
| 93 | P | Julia Behnke | 28 March 1993 (aged 31) | 1.80 m | 108 | 200 | (Germany) TuS Metzingen |
| 95 | LW | Johanna Stockschläder | 11 February 1995 (aged 29) | 1.67 m | 53 | 143 | Unattached |

Group play

| Pos | Team | Pld | W | D | L | GF | GA | GD | Pts | Qualification |
|---|---|---|---|---|---|---|---|---|---|---|
| 1 | Norway | 5 | 4 | 0 | 1 | 140 | 110 | +30 | 8 (Note: Norway 2 Pts, +5 GD; Sweden 2 Pts, +2 GD; Denmark 2 Pts, −7 GD.) | Quarterfinals |
| 2 | Sweden | 5 | 4 | 0 | 1 | 140 | 125 | +15 | 8 | Quarterfinals |
| 3 | Denmark | 5 | 4 | 0 | 1 | 126 | 116 | +10 | 8 | Quarterfinals |
| 4 | Germany | 5 | 1 | 0 | 4 | 136 | 134 | +2 | 2 (Note: Germany 2 Pts, +18 GD; South Korea 2 Pts, −6 GD; Slovenia 2 Pts, −12 GD.) | Quarterfinals |
| 5 | South Korea | 5 | 1 | 0 | 4 | 107 | 133 | −26 | 2 | |
| 6 | Slovenia | 5 | 1 | 0 | 4 | 116 | 147 | −31 | 2 | |

Source: Olympics Paris 2024 rankings
Rules for classification: 1) Points; 2) Head-to-head points; 3) Head-to-head goal difference; 4) Head-to-head goals scored; 5) Goal difference; 6) Goals scored; 7) Draw.
Notes:

| 25 July 2024; 16:00 | Germany | 22–23 | South Korea | Paris Expo Porte de Versailles, Paris; Attendance: 5,765; Referees: Belkhiri, Hamidi (ALG) |
| 25 July 2024; 16:00 | Döll 6 | (10–11) | Kang K., Ryu 6 | Paris Expo Porte de Versailles, Paris; Attendance: 5,765; Referees: Belkhiri, Hamidi (ALG) |
| 25 July 2024; 16:00 | 2× (suspension) | Report | 2× (suspension) 1× (red card) | Paris Expo Porte de Versailles, Paris; Attendance: 5,765; Referees: Belkhiri, Hamidi (ALG) |

| 28 July 2024; 14:00 | Sweden | 31–28 | Germany | Paris Expo Porte de Versailles, Paris; Attendance: 5,815; Referees: Pavićević, Ražnatović (MNE) |
| 28 July 2024; 14:00 | Carlson 7 | (19–12) | three players 5 | Paris Expo Porte de Versailles, Paris; Attendance: 5,815; Referees: Pavićević, Ražnatović (MNE) |
| 28 July 2024; 14:00 | 4× (suspension) | Report | 3× (suspension) | Paris Expo Porte de Versailles, Paris; Attendance: 5,815; Referees: Pavićević, Ražnatović (MNE) |

| 30 July 2024; 09:00 | Germany | 41–22 | Slovenia | Paris Expo Porte de Versailles, Paris; Attendance: 5,852; Referees: García, Paolantoni (ARG) |
| 30 July 2024; 09:00 | Lott, Smits 7 | (16–9) | Gros 6 | Paris Expo Porte de Versailles, Paris; Attendance: 5,852; Referees: García, Paolantoni (ARG) |
| 30 July 2024; 09:00 | 1× (yellow card) 4× (suspension) | Report | 1× (yellow card) 4× (suspension) | Paris Expo Porte de Versailles, Paris; Attendance: 5,852; Referees: García, Paolantoni (ARG) |

| 1 August 2024; 19:00 | Germany | 27–28 | Denmark | Paris Expo Porte de Versailles, Paris; Attendance: 5,722; Referees: Bíró, Kiss (HUN) |
| 1 August 2024; 19:00 | Behrend 6 | (12–15) | Højlund 7 | Paris Expo Porte de Versailles, Paris; Attendance: 5,722; Referees: Bíró, Kiss (HUN) |
| 1 August 2024; 19:00 | 3× (suspension) | Report | 4× (suspension) | Paris Expo Porte de Versailles, Paris; Attendance: 5,722; Referees: Bíró, Kiss (HUN) |

| 3 August 2024; 19:00 | Norway | 30–18 | Germany | Paris Expo Porte de Versailles, Paris; Attendance: 5,714; Referees: A. Konjičanin, D. Konjičanin (BIH) |
| 3 August 2024; 19:00 | Reistad 8 | (14–8) | three players 3 | Paris Expo Porte de Versailles, Paris; Attendance: 5,714; Referees: A. Konjičanin, D. Konjičanin (BIH) |
| 3 August 2024; 19:00 | 3× (suspension) | Report | 2× (suspension) | Paris Expo Porte de Versailles, Paris; Attendance: 5,714; Referees: A. Konjičanin, D. Konjičanin (BIH) |

Quarterfinal

| 6 August 2024; 13:30 | France | 26–23 | Germany | Stade Pierre-Mauroy, Lille; Attendance: 26,548; Referees: Jørum, Kleven (NOR) |
| 6 August 2024; 13:30 | Horacek 7 | (13–10) | Bölk 7 | Stade Pierre-Mauroy, Lille; Attendance: 26,548; Referees: Jørum, Kleven (NOR) |
| 6 August 2024; 13:30 | 1× (yellow card) 1× (suspension) | Report | 2× (suspension) | Stade Pierre-Mauroy, Lille; Attendance: 26,548; Referees: Jørum, Kleven (NOR) |

== Judo ==
Men

| Athlete | Event | Round of 64 | Round of 32 | Round of 16 | Quarterfinals | Semifinals | Repechage | Final / BM | |
| Athlete | Event | Opposition Result | Opposition Result | Opposition Result | Opposition Result | Opposition Result | Opposition Result | Opposition Result | Rank |
|---|---|---|---|---|---|---|---|---|---|
| Igor Wandtke | −73 kg | —N/a | De Oliveira (STP); W 10–00 | Margelidon (CAN); L 10–00 | Did not advance | | | | |
| Timo Cavelius | −81 kg | Bye | Muki (ISR); L 00–10 | Did not advance | | | | | |
| Eduard Trippel | −90 kg | —N/a | Nyman (SWE); L 00–01 | Did not advance | | | | | |
| Erik Abramov | +100 kg | —N/a | Tsetsentsengel (MGL); W 01–00 | Rakhimov (TJK); L 01–10 | Did not advance | | | | |

Women

| Athlete | Event | Round of 32 | Round of 16 | Quarterfinals | Semifinals | Repechage | Final / BM | |
| Athlete | Event | Opposition Result | Opposition Result | Opposition Result | Opposition Result | Opposition Result | Opposition Result | Rank |
|---|---|---|---|---|---|---|---|---|
| Katharina Menz | −48 kg | Costa (POR); L 00–01 | Did not advance | | | | | |
| Mascha Ballhaus | −52 kg | Martínez (MEX); W 11–00 | Bishrelt (UAE); W 11–00 | Keldiyorova (UZB); L 10–00 | Did not advance | Pimenta (BRA); L 00–10 | Did not advance | 7 |
| Pauline Starke | −57 kg | Beurskens (NED); W 11–01 | Enkhriilen (MGL); L 01–11 | Did not advance | | | | |
| Miriam Butkereit | −70 kg | Bye | Coughlan (AUS); W 10–00 | Willems (BEL); W 10–00 | Polleres (AUT); W 10–00 | Bye | Matić (CRO); L 00–01 | 2nd place, silver medalist(s) |
| Anna-Maria Wagner | −78 kg | Bye | Branser (GUI); W 11–00 | Takayama (JPN); W 10–00 | Lanir (ISR); L 00–10 | Bye | Zhenzhao (CHN); L 00–01 | 4 |
| Renée Lucht | +78 kg | Somkhishvili (GEO); L 00-10 | Did not advance | | | | | |

Mixed

| Athlete | Event | Round of 32 | Round of 16 | Quarterfinals | Semifinals | Repechage | Final / BM | |
| Athlete | Event | Opposition Result | Opposition Result | Opposition Result | Opposition Result | Opposition Result | Opposition Result | Rank |
|---|---|---|---|---|---|---|---|---|
| Erik Abramov; Eduard Trippel; Igor Wandtke; Miriam Butkereit; Renée Lucht; Pauline Starke | Team | Bye | Austria; W 4–1 | Brazil; W 4–3 | Japan; L 4–0 | Bye | South Korea; L 3–4 | 5 |

== Modern pentathlon ==
German modern pentathletes confirmed three quota places for Paris 2024. Marvin Dogue, with Annika Zillekens slated to compete at her fourth straight Games on the women's side, secured a spot each in their respective individual events by finishing among the eight highest-ranked modern pentathletes eligible for qualification at the 2023 European Games in Kraków, Poland; meanwhile Fabian Liebig qualified to compete in the men's competition through the release of final Olympic ranking.

| Athlete | Event | Fencing ranking round (épée one touch) | | | Semifinal | | | | | | | | | | | | Final | | | | | | | | | | | |
| Athlete | Event | Fencing ranking round (épée one touch) | | | FBR | Swimming (200 m freestyle) | | | Riding (show jumping) | | | Combined: shooting/running (10 m laser pistol)/(3000 m) | | | Total points | Rank | FBR | Swimming (200 m freestyle) | | | Riding (show jumping) | | | Combined: shooting/running (10 m laser pistol)/(3000 m) | | | Total points | Rank |
| Athlete | Event | V–D | Rank | MP points | BP | Time | Rank | MP points | Penalties | Rank | MP points | Time | Rank | MP points | Total points | Rank | BP | Time | Rank | MP points | Penalties | Rank | MP points | Time | Rank | MP points | Total points | Rank |
|---|---|---|---|---|---|---|---|---|---|---|---|---|---|---|---|---|---|---|---|---|---|---|---|---|---|---|---|---|
| Marvin Dogue | Men's | 20–15 | 14 | 225 | 8 | 2:07.95 | 15 | 295 | 14 | 14 | 286 | 10:11.78 | 3 | 689 | 1503 | 6 Q | 0 | 2:07.00 | 16 | 296 | 7 | 10 | 293 | 9:54.76 | 7 | 706 | 1520 | 8 |
| Fabian Liebig | Men's | 17–18 | 19 | 210 | 0 | 2:03.81 | 9 | 303 | 0 | 6 | 300 | 10:09.13 | 7 | 691 | 1504 | 6 Q | 0 | 2:04.18 | 11 | 302 | 0 | 5 | 300 | 10:05.62 | 12 | 695 | 1507 | 12 |
| Rebecca Langrehr | Women's | 18–17 | 14 | 215 | 0 | 2:19.58 | 12 | 271 | DNS | | 0 | 12:44.33 | 18 | 536 | 1022 | 18 | Did not advance | | | | | | | | | | | |
| Annika Zillekens | Women's | 17–18 | 18 | 210 | 0 | 2:18.88 | 10 | 273 | 25 | 15 | 275 | 11:11.93 | 2 | 629 | 1387 | 10 q | 2 | 2:20.71 | 14 | 269 | 0 | 7 | 300 | 11:45.71 | 16 | 595 | 1376 | 15 |

== Rowing ==
German rowers qualified boats in each of the following classes through the 2023 World Rowing Championships in Belgrade, Serbia.

Men

| Athlete | Event | Heats | | Repechage | | Quarterfinals | | Semifinals | | Final | |
| Athlete | Event | Time | Rank | Time | Rank | Time | Rank | Time | Rank | Time | Rank |
|---|---|---|---|---|---|---|---|---|---|---|---|
| Oliver Zeidler | Single sculls | 6:54.72 | 1 QF | Bye | | 6:45.32 | 1 SA/B | 6:35.77; OB | 1 FA | 6:37.57 | 1st place, gold medalist(s) |
| Jonas Gelsen; Marc Weber | Double sculls | 6:25.15 | 4 R | 6:34.59 | 2 SA/B | —N/a | | 6:17.69 | 4 FB | 6:17.07 | 9 |
| Max Appel; Anton Finger; Tim Ole Naske; Moritz Wolff | Quadruple sculls | 5:46.90 | 3 R | 5:52.39 | 1 FA | —N/a | | | | 5:50.62 | 5 |
| Julius Christ; Sönke Kruse | Coxless pair | 6:38.36 | 3 SA/B | Bye | | —N/a | | 6:47.13 | 6 FB | 6:28.61 | 11 |
| Frederik Breuer; Benedict Eggeling; Laurits Follert; Torben Johannesen; Max John; Olaf Roggensack; Mattes Schönherr; Wolf Niclas Schroeder; Jonas Wiesen | Eight | 5:41.63 | 3 R | 5:29.17 | 2 FA | —N/a | | | | 5:29.80 | 4 |

Women

| Athlete | Event | Heats | | Repechage | | Quarterfinals | | Semifinals | | Final | |
| Athlete | Event | Time | Rank | Time | Rank | Time | Rank | Time | Rank | Time | Rank |
|---|---|---|---|---|---|---|---|---|---|---|---|
| Alexandra Föster | Single sculls | 7:36.35 | 1 QF | Bye | | 7:30.98 | 2 SA/B | 7:24.63 | 4 FB | 7:23.53 | 7 |
| Pia Greiten; Leonie Menzel; Tabea Schendekehl; Maren Völz | Quadruple sculls | 6:15.28 | 2 FA | Bye | | —N/a | | | | 6:19.70 | 3rd place, bronze medalist(s) |

Qualification Legend: FA=Final A (medal); FB=Final B (non-medal); FC=Final C (non-medal); FD=Final D (non-medal); FE=Final E (non-medal); FF=Final F (non-medal); SA/B=Semifinals A/B; SC/D=Semifinals C/D; SE/F=Semifinals E/F; QF=Quarterfinals; R=Repechage

== Sailing ==
German sailors qualified one boat in each of the following classes through the 2023 Sailing World Championships in The Hague, Netherlands; and 2024 Semaine Olympique Française (Last Chance Regatta) in Hyères, France. All 14 sailors were officially nominated by the German Olympic Sports Confederation (DOSB) on 24 June and 2 July 2024.

Elimination events

| Athlete | Event | Preliminary races | | | | | | | | | | | | | | | | Quarterfinal | Semifinal | Final | | | |
| Athlete | Event | 1 | 2 | 3 | 4 | 5 | 6 | 7 | 8 | 9 | 10 | 11 | 12 | 13 | 14 | Net points | Rank | Rank | Rank | 1 | 2 | Total | Rank |
|---|---|---|---|---|---|---|---|---|---|---|---|---|---|---|---|---|---|---|---|---|---|---|---|
| Sebastian Kördel | Men's iQFoil | 10 | 15 | ~~21~~ | 11 | 20 | 16 | ~~25~~; ~~BFD~~ | 2 RDG | 1 | 1 | 11 | 8 | 9 | —N/a | 104 | 12 | Did not advance | | | | | |
| Jannis Maus | Men's Formula Kite | 8 | ~~9~~ | ~~11~~ | 2 | 2 | 8 | 2 | —N/a | | | | | | | 21 | 5 SF | —N/a | 2 | Did not advance | | | |
| Theresa Steinlein | Women's iQFoil | 3 | 11 | 12 | ~~16~~ | 16 | 13 | 2 | 5 | 5 | 13 | 12 | ~~25~~; ~~UFD~~ | 9 | 7 | 108 | 8 QF | 3 | Did not advance | | | | |
| Leonie Meyer | Women's Formula Kite | 4 | 7 | ~~8~~ | 4 | 3 | 6 | —N/a | | | | | | | | 24 | 5 SF | —N/a | 2 | Did not advance | | | |

Medal race events

| Athlete | Event | Race | | | | | | | | | | | | | Net points | Final rank |
| Athlete | Event | 1 | 2 | 3 | 4 | 5 | 6 | 7 | 8 | 9 | 10 | 11 | 12 | M* | Net points | Final rank |
|---|---|---|---|---|---|---|---|---|---|---|---|---|---|---|---|---|
| Philipp Buhl | Men's ILCA 7 | 7 | 30 | 3 | 28 | 26 | 11 | ~~44~~; ~~BFD~~ | 1 | —N/a | | | | EL | 106 | 13 |
| Julia Büsselberg | Women's ILCA 6 | 10 | 14 | 10 | 27 | 24 | 27 | 23 | ~~33~~ | 27 | —N/a | | | EL | 162 | 25 |
| Jakob Meggendorfer; Andreas Spranger | Men's 49er | 6 | ~~21~~; ~~BFD~~ | 3 | 12 | 8 | 3 | 16 | 12 | 11 | 7 | 17 | 14 | EL | 109 | 11 |
| Marla Bergmann; Hanna Wille | Women's 49er FX | 3 | 4 | 5 | ~~21~~; ~~BFD~~ | 16 | 7 | 11 | 8 | 8 | 3 | 14 | 5 | 14 | 98 | 6 |
| Anna Markfort; Simon Diesch | Mixed 470 | 8 | 4 | 9 | 10 | 16 | 9 | 19 | ~~20~~; ~~RET~~ | —N/a | | | | EL | 75 | 14 |
| Paul Kohlhoff; Alica Stuhlemmer | Mixed Nacra 17 | ~~18~~ | 9 | 3 | 6 | 3 | 2 | 13 | 8 | 5 | 14 | 17 | 10 | 5 | 100 | 8 |

M = Medal race; EL = Eliminated – did not advance into the medal race

== Shooting ==
German shooters achieved quota places for the following events based on their results at the 2022 and 2023 ISSF World Championships, 2022, 2023, and 2024 European Championships, 2023 European Games, and 2024 ISSF World Olympic Qualification Tournament.

Men

| Athlete | Event | Qualification | | Final | |
| Athlete | Event | Points | Rank | Points | Rank |
|---|---|---|---|---|---|
| Maximilian Ulbrich | 10 m air rifle | 628.9 | 14 | Did not advance | |
| Maximilian Ulbrich | 50 m rifle 3 positions | 588-25x | 17 | Did not advance | |
| Christian Reitz | 10 m air pistol | 580-22x | 3 Q | 177.6 | 5 |
| Robin Walter | 10 m air pistol | 577-17x | 8 Q | 158.4 | 6 |
| Florian Peter | 25 m rapid fire pistol | 585 | 6 Q | 20 | 4 |
| Christian Reitz | 25 m rapid fire pistol | 577 | 23 | Did not advance | |
| Sven Korte | Skeet | 122 | 8 | Did not advance | |

Women

| Athlete | Event | Qualification | | Final | |
| Athlete | Event | Points | Rank | Points | Rank |
|---|---|---|---|---|---|
| Anna Janßen | 10 m air rifle | 627.5 | 19 | Did not advance | |
| Lisa Müller | 10 m air rifle | 626.5 | 25 | Did not advance | |
| Jolyn Beer | 50 m rifle 3 positions | 587-29x | 9 | Did not advance | |
| Anna Janßen | 50 m rifle 3 positions | 587-27x | 11 | Did not advance | |
| Josefin Eder | 10 m air pistol | 567-11x | 30 | Did not advance | |
| Doreen Vennekamp | 10 m air pistol | 572-12x | 20 | Did not advance | |
| Josefin Eder | 25 m pistol | 569 | 36 | Did not advance | |
| Doreen Vennekamp | 25 m pistol | 583 | 13 | Did not advance | |
| Kathrin Murche | Trap | 119 | 11 | Did not advance | |
| Nadine Messerschmidt | Skeet | 117 | 17 | Did not advance | |
| Nele Wißmer | Skeet | 120 | 8 | Did not advance | |

Mixed

| Athlete | Event | Qualification | | Final | |
| Athlete | Event | Points | Rank | Points | Rank |
|---|---|---|---|---|---|
| Maximilian Ulbrich; Anna Janßen | 10 m air rifle | 629.7 | 4 QB | Le / Satpayev (KAZ); L 5–17 | 4 |
| Sven Korte; Nadine Messerschmidt | Skeet | 142 | 10 | Did not advance | |

== Skateboarding ==
Germany qualified one male and female skateboarder by virtue of finishing in the Top 20 of the Olympic World Skateboarding Rankings.

| Athlete | Event | Qualification | | Final | |
| Athlete | Event | Result | Rank | Result | Rank |
|---|---|---|---|---|---|
| Tyler Edtmayer | Men's park | 78.20 | 17 | Did not advance | |
| Lilly Stoephasius | Women's park | 74.40 | 14 | Did not advance | |

== Sport climbing ==
Germany qualified 2 male and 1 female athlete in the combined event respectively by virtue of finishing in the top 10 of the 2024 Olympic Qualifier Series.

Combined

| Athlete | Event | Semifinal | | | | | | Final | | | | | |
| Athlete | Event | Boulder | | Lead | | Total | Rank | Boulder | | Lead | | Total | Rank |
| Athlete | Event | Score | Place | Score | Place | Total | Rank | Score | Place | Score | Place | Total | Rank |
|---|---|---|---|---|---|---|---|---|---|---|---|---|---|
| Yannick Flohé | Men's | 29.7 | 12 | 39.1 | 9 | 68.8 | 9 | Did not advance | | | | | |
| Alexander Megos | Men's | 24.7 | 15 | 24.0 | 11 | 48.7 | 13 | Did not advance | | | | | |
| Lucia Dörffel | Women's | 29.2 | 16 | 51.1 | 10 | 80.3 | 16 | Did not advance | | | | | |

== Surfing ==
German surfers confirmed two shortboard quota place for Tahiti 2024. Camilla Kemp and Tim Elter qualified for the games, by becoming one of the top eight female surfer; and one of the top six male surfer, not yet qualified, at the 2024 ISA World Surfing Games in Arecibo, Puerto Rico.

| Athlete | Event | Round 1 | | Round 2 | Round 3 | Quarterfinal | Semifinal | Final / BM | |
| Athlete | Event | Score | Rank | Opposition Result | Opposition Result | Opposition Result | Opposition Result | Opposition Result | Rank |
|---|---|---|---|---|---|---|---|---|---|
| Tim Elter | Men's shortboard | 4.00 | 3 R2 | O'Leary (JPN); L 6.07–14.50 | Did not advance | | | | |
| Camilla Kemp | Women's shortboard | 2.80 | 3 R2 | Baum (RSA); L 4.94–10.50 | Did not advance | | | | |

Qualification legend: R3 – Qualifies to elimination rounds; R2 – Qualifies to repechage round

== Swimming ==
German swimmers achieved the entry standards in the following events for Paris 2024 (a maximum of two swimmers under the Olympic Qualifying Time (OST) and potentially at the Olympic Consideration Time (OCT)):

Men

| Athlete | Event | Heat | | Semifinal | | Final | |
| Athlete | Event | Time | Rank | Time | Rank | Time | Rank |
|---|---|---|---|---|---|---|---|
| Artem Selin | 50 m freestyle | 22.54 | 38 | Did not advance | | | |
| Josha Salchow | 100 m freestyle | 48.25 | 8 Q | 47.94 | 8 Q | 47.80 NR | 6 |
| Lukas Märtens | 200 m freestyle | 1:46.33 | 10 Q | 1:45.36 | 4 Q | 1:45.46 | 5 |
| Rafael Miroslaw | 200 m freestyle | 1:46.81 | 13 Q | 1:47.34 | 15 | Did not advance | |
| Lukas Märtens | 400 m freestyle | 3:44.13 | 1 Q | —N/a | | 3:41.78 | 1st place, gold medalist(s) |
| Oliver Klemet | 400 m freestyle | 3:45.75 | 8 Q | —N/a | | 3:46.59 | 7 |
| Sven Schwarz | 800 m freestyle | 7:43.67 | 6 Q | —N/a | | 7:43.59 | 5 |
| Florian Wellbrock | 800 m freestyle | 7:47.91 | 12 | —N/a | | Did not advance | |
| Sven Schwarz | 1500 m freestyle | 14:51.97 | 10 | —N/a | | Did not advance | |
| Florian Wellbrock | 1500 m freestyle | 15:01.88 | 14 | —N/a | | Did not advance | |
| Ole Braunschweig | 100 m backstroke | 53.95 | 18 | Did not advance | | | |
| Marek Ulrich | 100 m backstroke | 54.63 | 29 | Did not advance | | | |
| Lukas Märtens | 200 m backstroke | 1:56.89 | 2 Q | 1:56.33 | 4 Q | 1:55.97 | 8 |
| Kaii Winkler | 100 m butterfly | 52.64 | 28 | Did not advance | | | |
| Melvin Imoudu | 100 m breaststroke | 59.49 | 7 Q | 59.38 | 8 Q | 59.11 | 4 |
| Lucas Matzerath | 100 m breaststroke | 59.52 | 8 Q | 59.31 | 7 Q | 59.30 | 5 |
| Cedric Büssing | 400 m medley | 4:11.52 NR | 6 Q | —N/a | | 4:17.16 | 8 |
| Luca Nik Armbruster; Lukas Märtens; Rafael Miroslaw; Josha Salchow; Peter Varjasi | 4 × 100 m freestyle relay | 3:13.15 | 8 Q | —N/a | | 3:12.29 NR | 7 |
| Lukas Märtens; Rafael Miroslaw; Josha Salchow; Timo Sorgius | 4 × 200 m freestyle relay | 7:06.20 | 5 Q | —N/a | | 7:09.56 | 8 |
| Ole Braunschweig; Melvin Imoudu; Luca Nik Armbruster; Josha Salchow | 4 × 100 m medley relay | 3:32.51 | 8 Q | —N/a | | 3:32.46 | 6 |
| Oliver Klemet | 10 km open water | —N/a | | | | 1:50:54.8 | 2nd place, silver medalist(s) |
| Florian Wellbrock | 10 km open water | —N/a | | | | 1:51:54.4 | 8 |

Women

| Athlete | Event | Heat | | Semifinal | | Final | |
| Athlete | Event | Time | Rank | Time | Rank | Time | Rank |
|---|---|---|---|---|---|---|---|
| Julia Mrozinski | 200 m freestyle | 1:59.87 | 17 | Did not advance | | | |
| Isabel Gose | 400 m freestyle | 4:03.83 | 8 Q | —N/a | | 4:02.14 NR | 5 |
| Leonie Märtens | 400 m freestyle | 4:09.62 | 14 | —N/a | | Did not advance | |
| Isabel Gose | 800 m freestyle | 8:20.63 | 5 Q | —N/a | | 8:17.82 | 5 |
| Isabel Gose | 1500 m freestyle | 15:53.27 | 4 Q | —N/a | | 15:41.16 NR | 3rd place, bronze medalist(s) |
| Leonie Märtens | 1500 m freestyle | 16:08.69 | 8 Q | —N/a | | 16:12.57 | 8 |
| Anna Elendt | 100 m breaststroke | 1:07.00 | 20 | Did not advance | | | |
| Angelina Köhler | 100 m butterfly | 56.90 | 6 Q | 56.55 | 4 Q | 56.42 | 4 |
| Isabel Gose; Nicole Maier; Julia Mrozinski; Nele Schulze | 4 × 200 m freestyle relay | 7:55.57 | 10 | —N/a | | Did not advance | |
| Laura Riedemann; Anna Elendt; Angelina Köhler; Nina Holt | 4 × 100 m medley relay | 3:58.12 | 9 | —N/a | | Did not advance | |
| Leonie Beck | 10 km open water | —N/a | | | | 2:06:13.4 | 9 |
| Leonie Märtens | 10 km open water | —N/a | | | | 2:15:57.3 | 22 |

Mixed

| Athlete | Event | Heat | | Final | |
| Athlete | Event | Time | Rank | Time | Rank |
|---|---|---|---|---|---|
| Ole Braunschweig; Nina Holt; Melvin Imoudu; Angelina Köhler | 4 × 100 m medley relay | 3:44.75 | 9 | Did not advance | |

== Table tennis ==
Germany entered a full squad of male and female athletes into the table tennis competition at the Games. The nation's mixed doubles pair, to be officially named by DOSB at an eventual date, scored a successful gold-medal victory and secured an outright berth at the 2023 European Games in Kraków, Poland. Germany entered three women athletes by winning the 2023 STUPA European Table Tennis Championship in Malmö, Sweden; and three men by advancing to the quarter-finals round at the 2024 World Team Table Tennis Championships in Busan, South Korea.

Men

| Athlete | Event | Preliminary | Round 1 | Round 2 | Round of 16 | Quarterfinals | Semifinals | Final / BM | |
| Athlete | Event | Opposition Result | Opposition Result | Opposition Result | Opposition Result | Opposition Result | Opposition Result | Opposition Result | Rank |
|---|---|---|---|---|---|---|---|---|---|
| Dimitrij Ovtcharov | Singles | Bye | Madrid (MEX); W 4–0 | Ishiy (BRA); W 4–0 | Lebrun (FRA); L 3–4 | Did not advance | | | |
| Dang Qiu | Singles | Bye | Apolónia (POR); W 4–1 | Gerassimenko (KAZ); L 3–4 | Did not advance | | | | |
| Timo Boll; Dimitrij Ovtcharov; Dang Qiu | Team | —N/a | | | Canada; W 3–0 | Sweden; L 0–3 | Did not advance | | |

Women

| Athlete | Event | Preliminary | Round 1 | Round 2 | Round of 16 | Quarterfinals | Semifinals | Bronze medal match | |
| Athlete | Event | Opposition Result | Opposition Result | Opposition Result | Opposition Result | Opposition Result | Opposition Result | Opposition Result | Rank |
|---|---|---|---|---|---|---|---|---|---|
| Nina Mittelham | Singles | Bye | Jee (AUS); W 4–0 | Pyon (PRK); L 3–4 | Did not advance | | | | |
| Shan Xiaona | Singles | Bye | Póta (HUN); L 3–4 | Did not advance | | | | | |
| Annett Kaufmann; Yuan Wan; Shan Xiaona | Team | —N/a | | | United States; W 3–2 | India; W 3–1 | Japan; L 1–3 | South Korea; L 0–3 | 4 |

Mixed

| Athlete | Event | Round of 16 | Quarterfinals | Semifinals | Final / BM | |
| Athlete | Event | Opposition Result | Opposition Result | Opposition Result | Opposition Result | Rank |
|---|---|---|---|---|---|---|
| Dang Qiu; Nina Mittelham | Doubles | Lim J-h / Shin Y-b (KOR); L 0–4 | Did not advance | | | |

== Taekwondo ==
Germany entered one athlete into the taekwondo competition at the Games. 2022 world bronze medalist Lorena Brandl qualified directly for the women's heavyweight category (+67 kg) by finishing among the top eight taekwondo practitioners at the end of the WT Olympic Rankings qualifying period in December 2023.

| Athlete | Event | Round of 16 | Quarterfinals | Semifinals | Repechage | Bronze medal match | |
| Athlete | Event | Opposition Result | Opposition Result | Opposition Result | Opposition Result | Opposition Result | Rank |
|---|---|---|---|---|---|---|---|
| Lorena Brandl | Women's +67 kg | Acosta (CUB); W 0–0, 1–0 | Laurin (FRA); L 3–8, 3–8 | Did not advance | Abdusalomova (TJK); W 8–1, 15–4 | Lee (KOR); L 2–4, 9–5, 2–13 | 5 |

== Tennis ==
Men

| Athlete | Event | Round of 64 | Round of 32 | Round of 16 | Quarterfinals | Semifinals | Final / BM | |
| Athlete | Event | Opposition Score | Opposition Score | Opposition Score | Opposition Score | Opposition Score | Opposition Score | Rank |
|---|---|---|---|---|---|---|---|---|
| Dominik Koepfer | Singles | Raonic (CAN); W 6–7^{(2–7)}, 7–6^{(7–5)}, 7–6^{(7–1)} | Arnaldi (ITA); W 3–6, 6–2, 6–1 | Djokovic (SRB); L 5–7, 3–6 | Did not advance | | | |
| Maximilian Marterer | Singles | Lajović (SRB); W 6–3, 6–7^{(6–8)}, 6–3 | Auger-Aliassime (CAN); L 0–6, 1–6 | Did not advance | | | | |
| Jan-Lennard Struff | Singles | Cabral (POR); W 6–2, 6–2 | Moutet (FRA); L WO | Did not advance | | | | |
| Alexander Zverev | Singles | Munar (ESP); W 6–2, 6–2 | Macháč (CZE); W 6–3, 7–5 | Popyrin (AUS); W 7–5, 6–3 | Musetti (ITA); L 5–7, 5–7 | Did not advance | | |
| Kevin Krawietz; Tim Pütz | Doubles | —N/a | Medvedev / Safiullin (AIN); W 6–4, 6–4 | Monfils / Roger-Vasselin (FRA); W 6–3, 6–1 | Macháč / Pavlásek (CZE); L 6–3, 1–6, [5–10] | Did not advance | | |
| Jan-Lennard Struff; Dominik Koepfer | Doubles | —N/a | Mektić / Pavić (CRO); W 6–3, 6–7^{(5–7)}, [10–5] | Borges / Cabral (POR); W 6–2, 6–2 | Ebden / Peers (AUS); L 6–7^{(2–7)}, 6–7^{(4–7)} | Did not advance | | |

Women

| Athlete | Event | Round of 64 | Round of 32 | Round of 16 | Quarterfinals | Semifinals | Final / BM | |
| Athlete | Event | Opposition Score | Opposition Score | Opposition Score | Opposition Score | Opposition Score | Opposition Score | Rank |
|---|---|---|---|---|---|---|---|---|
| Angelique Kerber | Singles | Osaka (JPN); W 7–5, 6–3 | Cristian (ROU); W 6–4, 3–6, 6–4 | Fernandez (CAN); W 6–4, 6–3 | Zheng (CHN); L 7–6^{(7–4)}, 4–6, 6–7^{(6–8)} | Did not advance | | |
| Tamara Korpatsch | Singles | Wang X (CHN); L 2–6, 1–6 | Did not advance | | | | | |
| Tatjana Maria | Singles | Carlé (ARG); L 0–6, 0–6 | Did not advance | | | | | |
| Laura Siegemund | Singles | Collins (USA); L 3–6, 0–2, ret | Did not advance | | | | | |
| Laura Siegemund; Angelique Kerber | Doubles | —N/a | Boulter / Watson (GBR); L 2–6, 3–6 | Did not advance | | | | |
| Tatjana Maria; Tamara Korpatsch | Doubles | —N/a | Carlé / Podoroska (ARG); L 3–6, 0–6 | Did not advance | | | | |

Mixed

| Athlete | Event | Round of 16 | Quarterfinals | Semifinals | Final / BM | |
| Athlete | Event | Opposition Score | Opposition Score | Opposition Score | Opposition Score | Rank |
|---|---|---|---|---|---|---|
| Laura Siegemund; Alexander Zverev | Doubles | Siniaková / Macháč (CZE); L 4–6, 5–7 | Did not advance | | | |

== Triathlon ==
Germany confirmed six quota places (two per gender) in the triathlon events for Paris, following the nation's successful gold-medal triumph at the 2023 Mixed Relay World Championships in Hamburg; and through the release of final qualification ranking.

Individual

| Athlete | Event | Time | | | | | | Rank |
| Athlete | Event | Swim (1.5 km) | Trans 1 | Bike (40 km) | Trans 2 | Run (10 km) | Total | Rank |
|---|---|---|---|---|---|---|---|---|
| Tim Hellwig | Men's | 20:34 | 0:47 | 52:03 | 0:26 | 31:39 | 1:45:29 | 18 |
| Lasse Lührs | Men's | 21:00 | 0:52 | 51:34 | 0:27 | 32:03 | 1:45:56 | 21 |
| Jonas Schomburg | Men's | 20:32 | 0:51 | 52:00 | 0:22 | 32:41 | 1:46:26 | 24 |
| Nina Eim | Women's | 23:38 | 0:53 | 58:16 | 0:29 | 33:57 | 1:57:13 | 12 |
| Laura Lindemann | Women's | 22:48 | 0:53 | 59:07 | 0:31 | 33:42 | 1:57:01 | 8 |
| Lisa Tertsch | Women's | 22:45 | 0:50 | 59:12 | 0:29 | 33:47 | 1:57:03 | 9 |

Relay

| Athlete | Event | Time | | | | | | Rank |
| Athlete | Event | Swim (300 m) | Trans 1 | Bike (7 km) | Trans 2 | Run (2 km) | Total group | Rank |
|---|---|---|---|---|---|---|---|---|
| Tim Hellwig | Mixed relay | 4:09 | 1:05 | 9:40 | 0:23 | 4:49 | 20:06 | —N/a |
| Lisa Tertsch | Mixed relay | 4:58 | 1:06 | 10:47 | 0:26 | 5:24 | 22:41 | —N/a |
| Lasse Lührs | Mixed relay | 4:25 | 1:00 | 9:33 | 0:25 | 5:01 | 20:24 | —N/a |
| Laura Lindemann | Mixed relay | 4:55 | 1:10 | 10:20 | 0:29 | 5:34 | 22:28 | —N/a |
| Total | Mixed relay | —N/a | | | | | 1:25:39 | 1st place, gold medalist(s) |

== Volleyball ==
=== Beach ===
German men's and women's pairs qualified for Paris based on the FIVB Beach Volleyball Olympic Ranking.

| Athletes | Event | Preliminary round | | | | Round of 16 | Quarterfinal | Semifinal | Final | |
| Athletes | Event | Opposition Score | Opposition Score | Opposition Score | Rank | Opposition Score | Opposition Score | Opposition Score | Opposition Score | Rank |
|---|---|---|---|---|---|---|---|---|---|---|
| Nils Ehlers; Clemens Wickler | Men's | Bassereau / Lyneel (FRA); W 2–0 | Hodges / Schubert (AUS); W 2–1 | Bryl / Łosiak (POL); W 2–0 | 1 Q | Wanderley / Stein (BRA); W 2–0 | Boermans / de Groot (NED); W 2–0 | Mol / Sørum (NOR); W 2–1 | Åhman / Hellvig (SWE); L 0–2 | 2nd place, silver medalist(s) |
| Svenja Müller; Cinja Tillmann | Women's | Vieira / Chamereau (FRA); W 2–0 | Hermannová / Štochlová (CZE); W 2–0 | Hughes / Cheng (USA); L 0–2 | 2 Q | Graudiņa / Samoilova (LAT); L 1–2 | Did not advance | | | 9 |
| Laura Ludwig; Louisa Lippmann | Women's | Placette / Richard (FRA); L 0–2 | Hüberli / Brunner (SUI); L 0–2 | Álvarez Mendoza / Moreno (ESP); L 0–2 | 4 | Did not advance | | | | 19 |

=== Indoor ===
Summary

| Team | Event | Group stage | | | | Quarterfinal | Semifinal | Final / BM | |
| Team | Event | Opposition Score | Opposition Score | Opposition Score | Rank | Opposition Score | Opposition Score | Opposition Score | Rank |
|---|---|---|---|---|---|---|---|---|---|
| Germany men's | Men's tournament | Japan; W 3–2 | United States; L 2–3 | Argentina; W 3–0 | 2 Q | France; L 2–3 | Did not advance | | 6 |

==== Men's tournament ====
Germany men's volleyball team qualified for Paris by securing an outright berth as one of the two highest-ranked nations at the Olympic Qualification Tournament in Rio de Janeiro, Brazil.

Team roster

The roster was announced on 28 June 2024.

Head coach: (Poland) Michał Winiarski

- 1 Christian Fromm OH
- 5 Moritz Reichert OH
- 6 Johannes Tille S
- 9 György Grozer OP
- 10 Julian Zenger L
- 11 Lukas Kampa (c) S
- 12 Anton Brehme MB
- 13 Ruben Schott OH
- 14 Moritz Karlitzek OH
- 21 Tobias Krick MB
- 22 Tobias Brand OH
- 25 Lukas Maase MB

Group play

| Pos | Team | Pld | W | L | Pts | SW | SL | SR | SPW | SPL | SPR | Qualification |
|---|---|---|---|---|---|---|---|---|---|---|---|---|
| 1 | United States | 3 | 3 | 0 | 8 | 9 | 3 | 3.000 | 270 | 232 | 1.164 | Quarterfinals |
| 2 | Germany | 3 | 2 | 1 | 6 | 8 | 5 | 1.600 | 287 | 264 | 1.087 | Quarterfinals |
| 3 | Japan | 3 | 1 | 2 | 4 | 6 | 7 | 0.857 | 278 | 292 | 0.952 | Quarterfinals |
| 4 | Argentina | 3 | 0 | 3 | 0 | 1 | 9 | 0.111 | 196 | 243 | 0.807 | |

Source: Olympics
Rules for classification: Tiebreakers

| 27 July 2024; 09:00 | Japan | 2–3 | Germany | South Paris Arena 1, Paris; Attendance: 9,897; Referees: Fabrice Collados (FRA), Denny Cespedes (DOM) |
| 27 July 2024; 09:00 | (17–25, 25–23, 25–20, 28–30, 12–15); P2 Report | | | South Paris Arena 1, Paris; Attendance: 9,897; Referees: Fabrice Collados (FRA), Denny Cespedes (DOM) |

| 30 July 2024; 13:00 | United States | 3–2 | Germany | South Paris Arena 1, Paris; Attendance: 9,275; Referees: Scott Dziewirz (CAN), Vladimir Simonović (SUI) |
| 30 July 2024; 13:00 | (25–21, 25–17, 17–25, 20–25, 15–11); P2 Report | | | South Paris Arena 1, Paris; Attendance: 9,275; Referees: Scott Dziewirz (CAN), Vladimir Simonović (SUI) |

| 2 August 2024; 09:00 | Argentina | 0–3 | Germany | South Paris Arena 1, Paris; Attendance: 9,455; Referees: Fabrice Collados (FRA), Hamid Al-Rousi (UAE) |
| 2 August 2024; 09:00 | (13–25, 21–25, 21–25); P2 Report | | | South Paris Arena 1, Paris; Attendance: 9,455; Referees: Fabrice Collados (FRA), Hamid Al-Rousi (UAE) |

Quarterfinal

| 5 August 2024; 17:00 | France | 3–2 | Germany | South Paris Arena 1, Paris; Attendance: 9,405; Referees: Juraj Mokrý (SVK), Denny Cespedes (DOM) |
| 5 August 2024; 17:00 | (18–25, 26–28, 25–20, 25–21, 15–13); P2 Report | | | South Paris Arena 1, Paris; Attendance: 9,405; Referees: Juraj Mokrý (SVK), Denny Cespedes (DOM) |

== Wrestling ==
Germany qualified seven wrestlers for the following classes into the Olympic competition. Luisa Niemesch qualified for the games by virtue of top five results through the 2023 World Championships in Belgrade, Serbia; Sandra Paruszewski and Jello Krahmer qualified for the games after winning their semifinal match through the 2024 European Qualification Tournament in Baku, Azerbaijan; meanwhile Anastasia Blayvas and Erik Thiele qualified for the games through the 2024 World Qualification Tournament in Istanbul, Turkey. Lucas Lazogianis and Annika Wendle joined the squads due to reallocations of Individual Neutral Athletes quotas.

Key:

- F – Victory by fall.

Freestyle

| Athlete | Event | Round of 16 | Quarterfinal | Semifinal | Repechage | Final / BM | |
| Athlete | Event | Opposition Result | Opposition Result | Opposition Result | Opposition Result | Opposition Result | Rank |
|---|---|---|---|---|---|---|---|
| Erik Thiele | Men's −97 kg | Silot (CUB); L 0–5 | Did not advance | | | | |
| Anastasia Blayvas | Women's −50 kg | Stadnik (AZE); L 2–6 | Did not advance | | | | |
| Annika Wendle | Women's −53 kg | Prevolaraki (GRE); W 3–2 | Yetgil (TUR); W 3^{F}–5 | Yépez (ECU); L 0–10 | Bye | Choe (PRK); L 0–10 | 5 |
| Sandra Paruszewski | Women's −57 kg | Nichita (MDA); L 0–9 | Did not advance | | Penalber (BRA); L 0–7 | Did not advance | |
| Luisa Niemesch | Women's −62 kg | Lee (KOR); W 3–0 | Bullen (NOR); L 0–10 | Did not advance | | | |

Greco-Roman

| Athlete | Event | Round of 16 | Quarterfinal | Semifinal | Repechage | Final / BM | |
| Athlete | Event | Opposition Result | Opposition Result | Opposition Result | Opposition Result | Opposition Result | Rank |
|---|---|---|---|---|---|---|---|
| Lucas Lazogianis | Men's −97 kg | Rosillo (CUB); L 5–7 | Did not advance | | | | |
| Jello Krahmer | Men's −130 kg | Lingzhe (CHN); L 1–4 | Did not advance | | | | |
