= Laura Raquel Müller =

German athlete (born 2004)

Personal information
- Nationality: German
- Born: 23 April 2004 (age 22)

Sport
- Sport: Athletics
- Event: Long jump

Achievements and titles
- Personal bests: Long jump: 6.81m (Dortmund, 2024)
Medal record
Women's athletics
Representing Germany
European U20 Championships
| Bronze medal – third place | Jerusalem 2023 | Long jump |

Laura Raquel Müller (born 23 April 2004) is a German track and field athlete who competes in the long jump. She represented Germany at the 2024 Paris Olympics.

== Early life ==
From Verrenberg in the Hohenlohe district of Germany, as a youngster she participated in gymnastics and dance, as well as athletics at a club in Öhringen. From January 2022 she attended a boarding school in Stuttgart and her athletics career began to be overseen by Tamas Kiss.

== Career ==
A successful junior athlete, in 2019 she set a new German U16 record over 100 metres. She went on to win gold at the German U18 and U20 athletics championships in both the long jump and 100 metres.

In 2021, she came fourth at the U20 European Championships in Tallinn, Estonia with a jump of 6.61 metres, finishing a centimetre behind compatriot Mikaelle Assani. After missing 18 months of competition with a succession of injuries, she returned in July 2023 with seventh place in the long jump at the German national championships in Kassel. In August 2023, she was a bronze medalist in the long jump at the European U20 Championships in Jerusalem, Israel.

In January 2024, she set a new personal best distance of 6.81 metres in winning the long jump at the World Athletics Indoor Tour Bronze event in Dortmund.

In May 2024, she was selected for the 2024 European Athletics Championships in Rome, Italy. At the championships, she recorded a best jump of 6.43 metres but did not progress to the final. She competed in the long jump at the 2024 Paris Olympics where she managed a distance of 6.40 metres without qualifying for the final. She was named the Hohenlohe Sportswoman of the Year 2024.
