= Mikaelle Assani =

German athlete (born 2002)

Personal information
- Born: 18 August 2002 (age 24)

Sport
- Country: Germany
- Sport: Athletics
- Event: Long jump

Achievements and titles
- Personal bests: Long jump: 6.91m (Weinheim, 2023)
Medal record
Women's athletics
Representing Germany
European U20 Championships
Bronze medal – third place	Tallinn 2021	Long jump

Mikaelle Assani (born 18 August 2002) is a German track and field athlete who competes in the long jump.

== Early and personal life ==
From Pforzheim, Germany, to a Cameroonian mother. A Christian, she has suffered injuries due to a genetic condition known as flat feet. She is an LG Region Karlsruhe athlete and attended the University of Nebraska–Lincoln in 2021. She later transferred to study bioengineering at Karlsruhe Institute of Technology.

== Career ==
She competed for Germany for the first time at the 15th European Youth Olympic Festival in Baku in 2019.

In 2020, Assani won the gold at the German U20 Indoor Championships before an injury ruled her out of the rest of the year. In 2021, she won the gold at the German U20 Championships and was a bronze medalist at the U20 European Championships in Tallinn, finishing a centimetre ahead of compatriot Laura Raquel Müller. She also won the silver at the German U23 Championships and finished fourth at the senior German Championships. She was the world's best female U20 athlete in 2021 with a distance of 6.64m.

In June 2022, Mikaelle Assani won the bronze at the German Championships in Berlin, She also competed for Germany at the European Athletics Championships in Munich in August 2022, and was the youngest German athlete in the squad.

In February 2023, she set a new personal best distance of 6.70 metres in Dortmund, and came third at the German Indoor Championships. She competed in Istanbul at the European Athletics Indoor Championships in March 2023.

On 27 May 2023, she jumped a new personal best distance of 6.91m in Weinheim. Assani competed at the 2023 World Athletics Championships in Budapest.

In February 2024, she finished runner-up at the German indoor championships equalling her personal best jump of 6.91 metres. She was subsequently selected for the 2024 World Athletics Indoor Championships in Glasgow in which she finished in fourth place with a jump of 6.77 metres.

In May 2024, she was selected for the 2024 European Athletics Championships in Rome. She finished in 4th place with a jump of 6.91 metres.

At the 2024 Summer Olympics she participated in the Women's long jump event, jumping 6.24 metres.

While competing at the European Indoor Championship 2025 in Apeldoorn (Netherlands) Women´s long jump event, she sustained a serios injury (partial and complete tears of the hamstring tendon) of the leaving her out of training for months.

Returning from a prolonoged injury break, she unexpectedly took gold in the long jump at the German Championships with 6.67m. In August 2026, she competed at the 2026 European Athletics Championships in Birmingham, England.
