= Verrenberg =

- Stadtteil of Öhringen
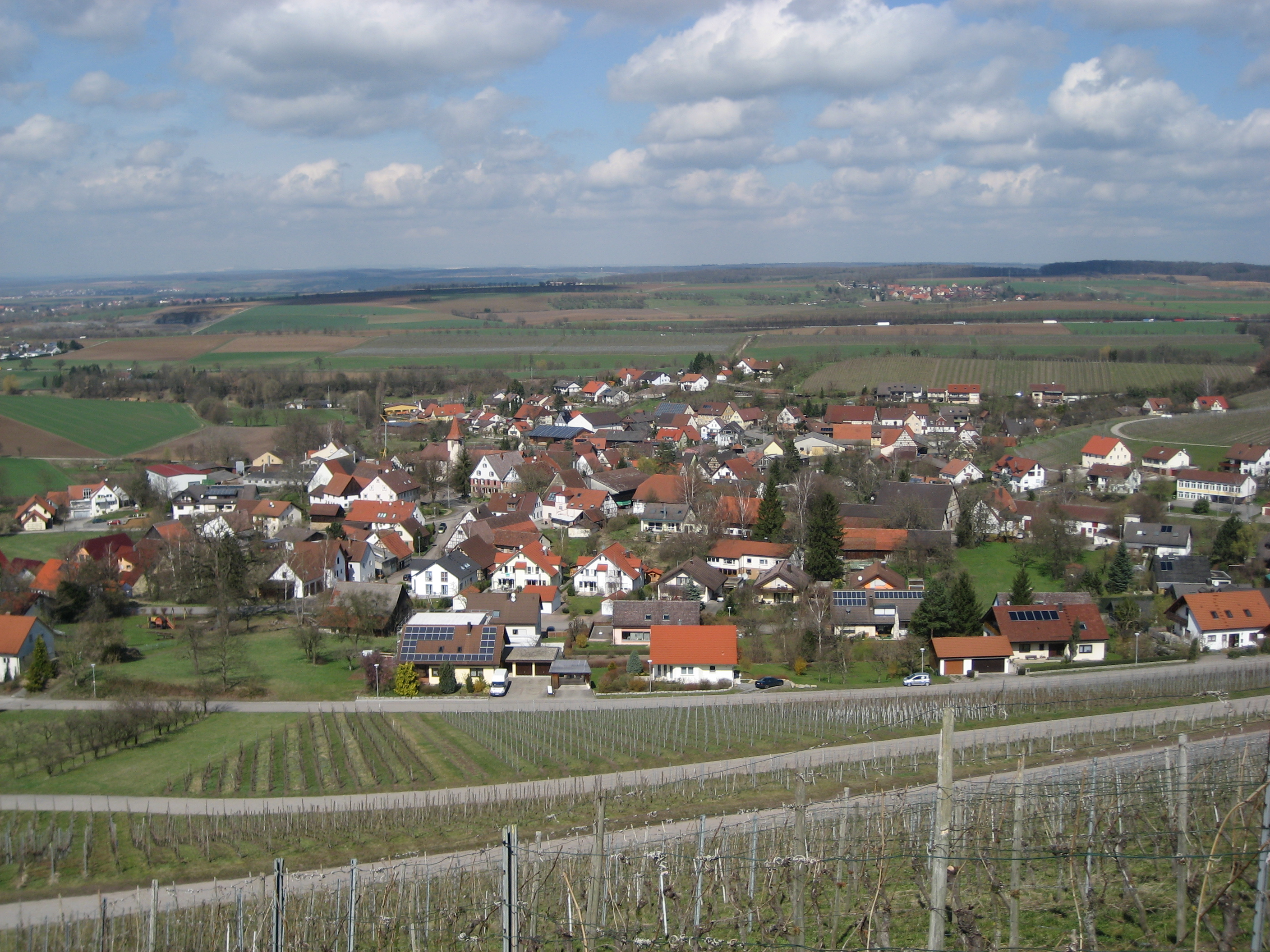
- Interactive map of Verrenberg
- Location within Germany Location within Baden-Württemberg
- Country: Germany
- State: Baden-Württemberg
- District: Hohenlohe
- Town: Öhringen

Population
  - Total: 680
- Time zone: UTC+01:00 (CET)
  - Summer (DST): UTC+02:00 (CEST)

Verrenberg is a village in Hohenlohe, Germany and has been a part of Öhringen since February 1, 1972. Today, Verrenberg has about 680 inhabitants.

The first documented proof of Verrenberg was around the year 1242; however, it is thought to have originated between the 9th and 11th centuries. In 1525, the Verrenberger, "Schönmichel" (Beautiful Michel) was the spokesman of the Verrenberger farmers in the German Peasants' War. By a division of Hohenlohe's in 1553, Verrenberg became a part of Hohenlohe-Waldenburg. In 1615, a new ruling Hohenlohe-Pfedelbach line came to Verrenburg. After the end of the Pfedelbach line in 1728, Waldenburg-Barenstein gained the succession.

From the night on June 1, 1897 to July 30, 1897 hailstorms ravaged almost the entire agricultural economy of Verrenberg and a large part of its buildings.

Another well-known citizen of Verrenberg was Johann Michael Weipert. Born in Verrenberg in 1822, he was in his early youth an orphan in the "Gustav-Werner Foundation to the brother house" in Reutlingen, where he learned his trade as a cartwright. On August 6, 1866 Johann Michael Weipart opened "ein Geschäft auf eigene Rechnung" ("a business on their own account"), which he later moved to Heilbronn in 1871. In the year of his death in 1904, 18,020 tools and machines were sold.

== Religion ==
Verrenberg was never a self-sufficient parish, but has, from the beginning, been under the aegis of the evangelical rectory, Bitzfeld. A newly constructed building of worship in Verrenberg was established in 1722. However, it was only on special occasions that Mass was celebrated there. Many changes in it followed until 1840. The last major change in its appearance occurred when it was temporarily next to the council parlour and school. Today, it serves as the seat of the local administration office.
