= Goran Obradović (coach) =

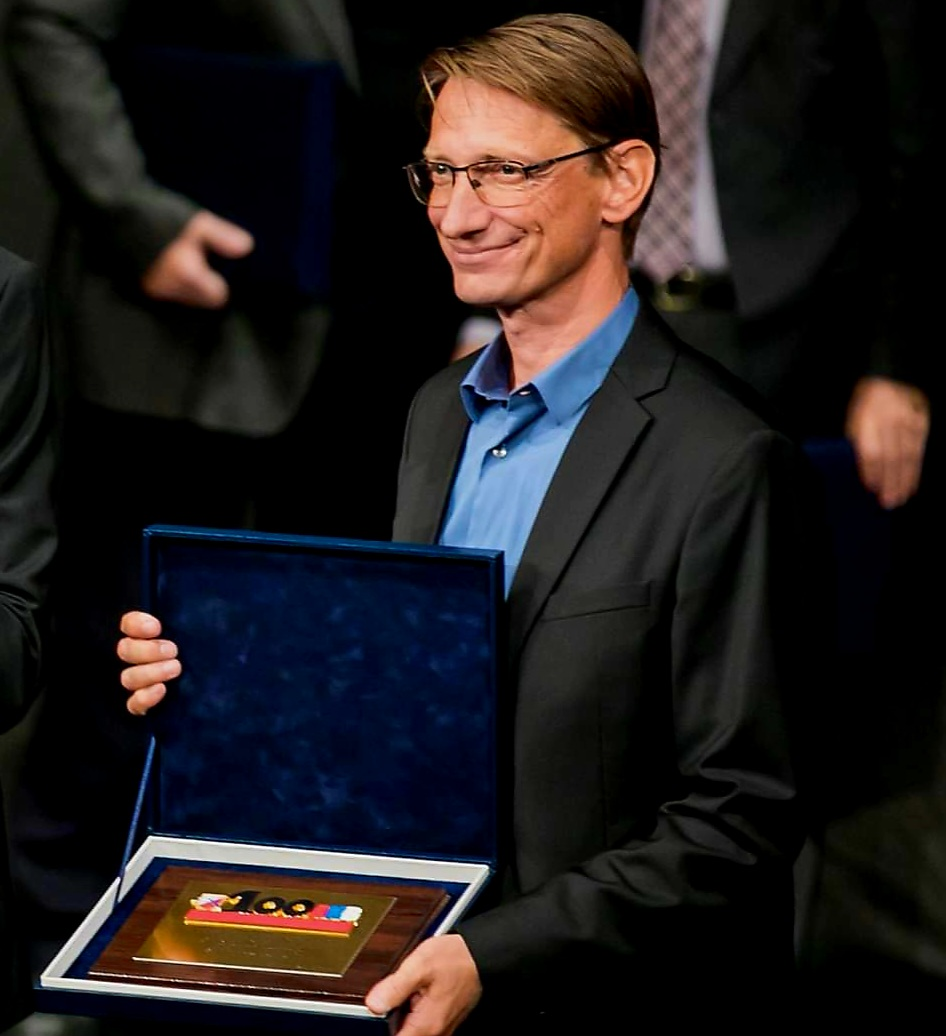
- Goran Obradović

Personal information
- Nationality: Serbian
- Born: 29 January 1971 (age 55) Novi Sad, SR Serbia, SFR Yugoslavia
- Height: 1.87 m (6 ft 1 1/2 in)
- Weight: 74 kg (163 lb; 11 st 9 lb)

Sport
- Country: Serbia
- Sport: Track and field
Medal record
Event	1st	2nd	3rd
Olympic Games	0	0	1
World Championships	1	0	2
World Indoor Championships	2	1	1
European Championships	2	1	0
European Indoor Championships	3	0	1
Total	8	2	5
Olympic Games
Bronze medal – third place	2016 Rio de Janeiro	Long jump W
World Championships
Gold medal – first place	2023 Budapest	Long jump W
Bronze medal – third place	2015 Beijing	Long jump W
Bronze medal – third place	2013 Moscow	Long jump W
World Indoor Championships
Gold medal – first place	2022 Belgrade	Long jump W
Gold medal – first place	2018 Birmingham	Long jump W
Silver medal – second place	2016 Portland	Long jump W
Bronze medal – third place	2014 Sopot	Long jump W
European Championships
Gold medal – first place	2022 Munich	Long jump W
Gold medal – first place	2016 Amsterdam	Long jump W
Silver medal – second place	2014 Zürich	Long jump W
European Indoor Championships
Bronze medal – third place	2023 Istanbul	Long jump W
Gold medal – first place	2019 Glasgow	Long jump W
Gold medal – first place	2017 Belgrade	Long jump W
Gold medal – first place	2015 Prague	Long jump W
Continental Cup
Silver medal – second place	2014 Marrakech	Long jump W
European Athletics U23 Championships
Silver medal – second place	2011 Ostrava	Long jump W
Bronze medal – third place	2009 Kaunas	Decathlon M
World Junior Championships
Bronze medal – third place	2008 Bydgoszcz	Decathlon M
Mediterranean Games
Gold medal – first place	2018 Taragona	Long jump W
Gold medal – first place	1997 Bari	High jump M

Goran Obradović (Serbian Cyrillic: Горан Обрадовић, born 29 January 1971) is an athletic coach and works in Athletic Club Vojvodina from Novi Sad. Also he is the president of the board of experts at Athletic Federation Of Serbia.

== Career ==
He started doing athletics in 1982 at Athletic club Vojvodina, Novi Sad. His main discipline was high jump and his best results were national vicechampion in 1991 and 1992. He became a coach fairly early, at the age of 24. He studied at the University of Physical Culture in Novi Sad and at the Sports Academy in Belgrade. His first coaching successes have been with his jumping team Stevan Zorić high jump, Đorđe Niketić high jump, Marko Milinkov long jump, Feđa Kamasi pole vault, who were the contestants in most of the major athletic competitions. In 2005 he created the first multi event team in Serbia with his colleague Feđa Kamasi. This team has produced many decathletes, and some of them become known worldwide. Mihail Dudaš, a big competitor and winner of many medals, Igor Šarčević and Slobodan Matijević, along with decathlon, they trained for the bob sleigh and qualified for the 2010 Winter Olympic Games in Vancouver. Dino Dodig and Darko Pešić are the decathletes from the most recent generation of athletes.

Obradović achieved his greatest results with Ivana Španović, a long jumper. Since 2013, they have won 15 major medals. The most important ones include the IAAF World Championships medal in Moscow 2013, which was the first medal of its kind in the history of Serbia, the Olympic medal at 2016 Summer Olympics in Rio for her country after 60 years and the first Global gold medal for Serbia at the IAAF World Indoor Championships in Birmingham 2018.

In 2022 Ivana become World Indoor Champion, European Champion and Diamond League Trophy winner.

With his athletes he has won the most global medals for Serbia. He has received many awards: "Majska nagrada" the greatest national award in the field of sports, The best Athletic Coach of The Year – for years 2014, 2015, 2016, 2017, 2018, 2019, 2021, 2022, 2023. The Best Sports Coach in town – for years 2013, 2014, 2015, 2016, 2017, 2018, 2023. "Jovan Mikić Spartak" the greatest Vojvodina province award in the field of sports.

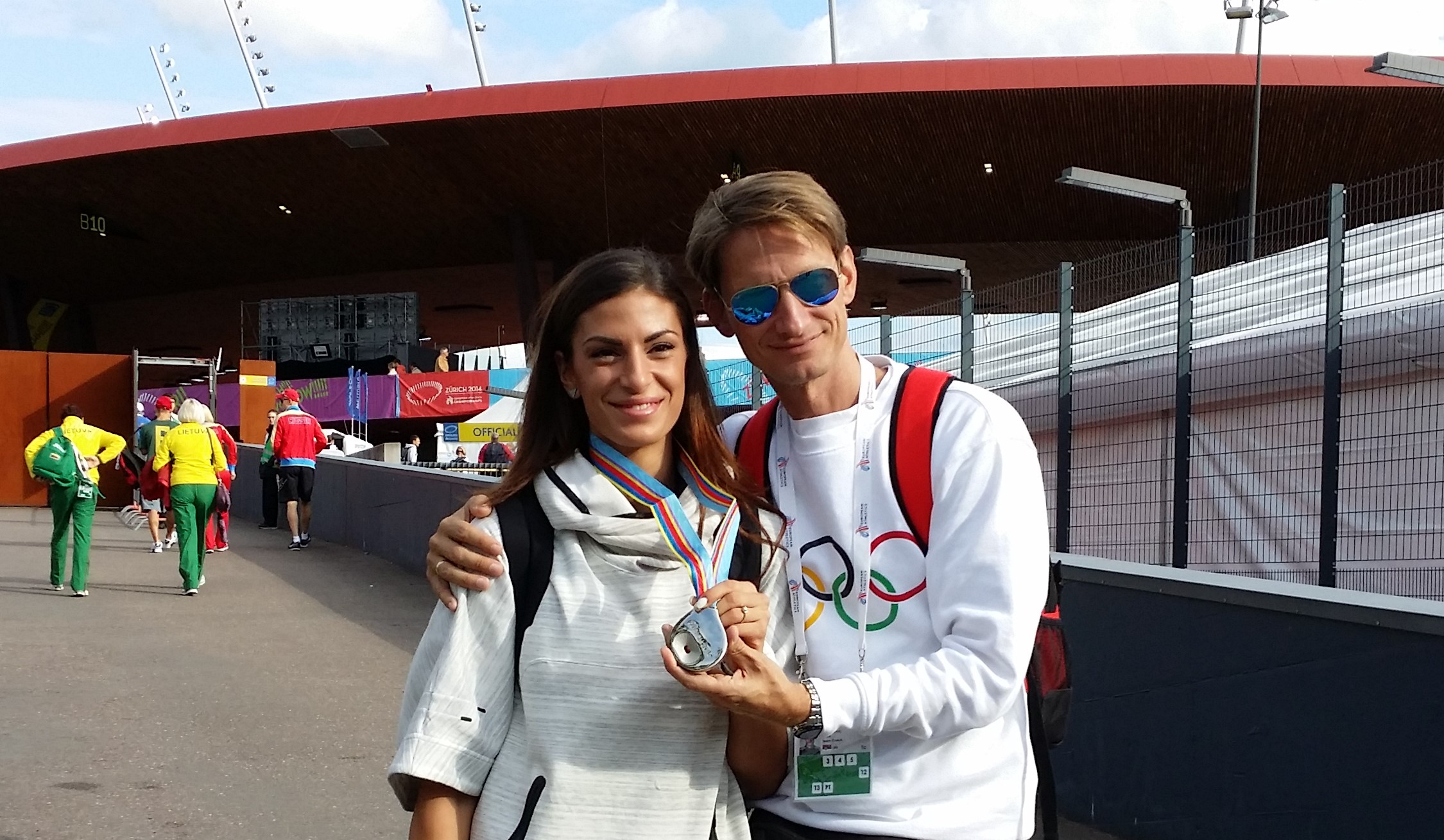
Ivana and Goran
