= Athletics at the 2020 Summer Olympics – Women's long jump =

Women's long jump at the Games of the XXXII Olympiad
- Olympic Athletics
- Venue: Japan National Stadium
- Dates: 1 August 2021 (qualifying); 3 August 2021 (final)
- Competitors: 30 from 23 nations
- Winning distance: 7.00

Medalists
1st place, gold medalist(s)		Malaika Mihambo	Germany
2nd place, silver medalist(s)		Brittney Reese	United States
3rd place, bronze medalist(s)		Ese Brume	Nigeria

The women's long jump event at the 2020 Summer Olympics took place on 1 and 3 August 2021 at the Japan National Stadium. 30 athletes from 23 nations competed. Germany's 2019 world champion Malaika Mihambo moved up from third to first with her final round jump of 7.00 metres, to win the gold medal. 2012 Olympic champion Brittney Reese of the USA won the silver and Nigeria's Ese Brume the bronze.

== Summary ==
Returning from the Rio podium, silver medalist Brittney Reese now a month short of turning 35, and bronze medalist Ivana Španović. Gold medalist Tianna Bartoletta did not qualify to return. 2019 World Champion Malaika Mihambo was here, along with the rest of the 2019 podium Maryna Bekh-Romanchuk and Ese Brume. Reese was 2017 Champion over Bartoletta. In fact, Reese had medaled in every major competition since 2009 until missing out in 2019.

Only two made the automatic qualifier in their first attempt, Tara Davis and Khaddi Sagnia. After three attempts, eight made it. It took 6.60m to reach the final. In an upset, Darya Klishina of the ROC failed to set a mark in the qualifying round.

Brume took the lead in the first round with a 6.97 metres, with Mihambo in second at 6.83 metres. Španović moved into second on her second attempt with a 6.91 metres. Seconds later, Mihambo answered with a 6.95 metres. Reese also jumped 6.97 metres on her third attempt and held a 6.81 metres second attempt to use as a tiebreaker to take over the gold medal position. Bekh-Romanchuk landed her only legal attempt to keep herself in the competition, but still out of reach of the podium. In the fourth round, Reese improved her second best jump to 6.87 metres, Brume answered with a 6.88 metres to take over gold position. Reese came back in the fifth round to jump 6.95 metres to get back the tiebreaker into gold position. On her final attempt, Mihambo jumped 7.00 m (22 ft 11 1/2 in) to grab gold. Brume improved to 6.90 metres on her final attempt, not enough to improve the color of her medal. And Reese's 6.84 metres fell short as well. Reese repeated as silver medalist.

== Background ==
This was the 19th appearance of the event, having appeared at every Summer Olympics since 1948.

== Qualification ==
A National Olympic Committee (NOC) could enter up to 3 qualified athletes in the women's long jump event if all athletes meet the entry standard or qualify by ranking during the qualifying period (the limit of 3 has been in place since the 1930 Olympic Congress). The qualifying standard is 6.82 metres. This standard was "set for the sole purpose of qualifying athletes with exceptional performances unable to qualify through the World Athletics Rankings pathway." The world rankings, based on the average of the best five results for the athlete over the qualifying period and weighted by the importance of the meet, will then be used to qualify athletes until the cap of 32 is reached.

The qualifying period was originally from 1 May 2019 to 29 June 2020. Due to the COVID-19 pandemic, the period was suspended from 6 April 2020 to 30 November 2020, with the end date extended to 29 June 2021. The world rankings period start date was also changed from 1 May 2019 to 30 June 2020; athletes who had met the qualifying standard during that time were still qualified, but those using world rankings would not be able to count performances during that time. The qualifying time standards could be obtained in various meets during the given period that have the approval of World Athletics. Both outdoor and indoor meets are eligible. The most recent Area Championships may be counted in the ranking, even if not during the qualifying period.

NOCs can also use their universality place—each NOC can enter one female athlete regardless of time if they had no female athletes meeting the entry standard for an athletics event—in the long jump.

== Competition format ==
The 2020 competition continued to use the two-round format with divided final introduced in 1952. The qualifying round gives each competitor three jumps to achieve a qualifying distance of 6.75 metres; if fewer than 12 women do so, the top 12 (including all those tied) will advance. The final provides each jumper with three jumps; the top eight jumpers receive an additional three jumps for a total of six, with the best to count (qualifying round jumps are not considered for the final).

== Records ==
Prior to this competition, the existing global and area records were as follows.

World record	Galina Chistyakova (URS)	7.52	Leningrad, Soviet Union	11 June 1988
Olympic record	Jackie Joyner-Kersee (USA)	7.40	Seoul, South Korea	29 September 1988
World Leading	Ese Brume (NGR)	7.17	Chula Vista, United States	29 May 2021

Area	Distance (m)	Wind	Athlete	Nation
Africa (records)	7.17	+1.1	Ese Brume	Nigeria
Asia (records)	7.01	+1.4	Yao Weili	China
Europe (records)	7.52 WR	+1.4	Galina Chistyakova	Soviet Union
North, Central America and the Caribbean (records)	7.49	+1.3	Jackie Joyner-Kersee	United States
Oceania (records)	7.05	+2.0	Brooke Stratton	Australia
South America (records)	7.26	+1.8	Maurren Maggi	Brazil

== Schedule ==
All times are Japan Standard Time (UTC+9)

The women's long jump took place over two separate days.

Date	Time	Round
Sunday, 1 August 2021	9:10	Qualifying
Tuesday, 3 August 2021	9:00	Final

== Results ==
=== Qualifying ===
Qualification Rules: Qualifying performance 6.75 (Q) or at least 12 best performers (q) advance to the Final.

Rank	Group	Athlete	Nation	1	2	3	Result	Notes
1	B	Ivana Španović	Serbia	X	7.00		7.00	Q, SB
2	B	Malaika Mihambo	Germany	6.64	6.56	6.98	6.98	Q, SB
3	A	Brittney Reese	United States	6.52	6.86		6.86	Q
4	A	Tara Davis	United States	6.85			6.85	Q
5	B	Chantel Malone	British Virgin Islands	X	6.44	6.82	6.82	Q
6	B	Ese Brume	Nigeria	6.68	6.55	6.76	6.76	Q
7	A	Khaddi Sagnia	Sweden	6.76			6.76	Q
8	A	Abigail Irozuru	Great Britain	6.39	6.65	6.75	6.75	Q, SB
9	A	Tyra Gittens	Trinidad and Tobago	6.12	6.72	6.34	6.72	q
10	A	Maryna Bekh-Romanchuk	Ukraine	6.71	X	X	6.71	q
11	A	Jazmin Sawyers	Great Britain	6.55	X	6.62	6.62	q
12	A	Brooke Stratton	Australia	6.60	6.44	6.32	6.60	q
13	B	Quanesha Burks	United States	6.04	6.56	6.18	6.56	
14	B	Nastassia Mironchyk-Ivanova	Belarus	6.21	6.39	6.55	6.55	
15	A	Maryse Luzolo	Germany	6.54	X	6.38	6.54	
16	B	Anasztázia Nguyen	Hungary	X	6.52	X	6.52	
17	A	Alina Rotaru	Romania	6.46	6.47	6.51	6.51	
18	B	Eliane Martins	Brazil	X	6.43	6.38	6.43	
19	A	Rellie Kaputin	Papua New Guinea	X	6.30	6.40	6.40	
20	B	Florentina Iusco	Romania	6.19	X	6.36	6.36	
21	B	Fátima Diame	Spain	X	6.27	6.32	6.32	
22	A	Christabel Nettey	Canada	6.18	6.23	6.29	6.29	
23	B	Yanis David	France	6.27	6.10	6.26	6.27	
24	A	Chanice Porter	Jamaica	X	6.13	6.22	6.22	
25	B	Tissanna Hickling	Jamaica	6.17	X	6.19	6.19	
26	B	Darya Reznichenko	Uzbekistan	5.92	5.94	6.19	6.19	
27	A	Nathalee Aranda	Panama	5.98	6.12	X	6.12	
28	B	Lorraine Ugen	Great Britain	6.05	X	X	6.05	
–	B	Ksenija Balta	Estonia	X	–	–	NM	
–	A	Darya Klishina	ROC	X	X	X	NM	

=== Final ===
Rank	Athlete	Nation	#1	#2	#3	#4	#5	#6	Result	Notes
1st place, gold medalist(s)	Malaika Mihambo	Germany	6.83	6.95	6.78	X	X	7.00	7.00	SB
2nd place, silver medalist(s)	Brittney Reese	United States	6.60	6.81	6.97	6.87	6.95	6.84	6.97	
3rd place, bronze medalist(s)	Ese Brume	Nigeria	6.97	6.67	X	6.88	X	6.90	6.97	
4	Ivana Španović	Serbia	6.71	6.91	6.84	X	6.63	6.72	6.91	
5	Maryna Bekh-Romanchuk	Ukraine	X	X	6.88	X	X	X	6.88	
6	Tara Davis	United States	6.62	6.67	6.81	6.84	6.83	6.71	6.84	
7	Brooke Stratton	Australia	X	6.52	6.83	6.24	6.62	X	6.83	
8	Jazmin Sawyers	Great Britain	X	6.80	6.53	6.74	X	X	6.80	
9	Khaddi Sagnia	Sweden	6.58	6.67	6.58				6.67	
10	Tyra Gittens	Trinidad and Tobago	6.30	6.60	6.53				6.60	
11	Abigail Irozuru	Great Britain	X	6.51	6.27				6.51	
12	Chantel Malone	British Virgin Islands	6.50	4.73	6.48				6.50	
