= 2008 World Junior Championships in Athletics – Women's long jump =

The women's long jump event at the 2008 World Junior Championships in Athletics was held in Bydgoszcz, Poland, at Zawisza Stadium on 11 and 12 July.

== Medalists ==
Gold	Ivana Španović; Serbia
Silver	Nastassia Mironchyk; Belarus
Bronze	Dailenis Alcántara; Cuba

== Results ==
=== Final ===
12 July

Rank	Name	Nationality	Attempts						Result	Notes
Rank	Name	Nationality	1	2	3	4	5	6	Result	Notes
1st place, gold medalist(s)	Ivana Španović	Serbia	6.33 (w: -0.4 m/s)	x	6.61 (w: -1.3 m/s)	6.38 (w: -1.6 m/s)	6.41 (w: -1.7 m/s)	6.55 (w: -0.6 m/s)	6.61 (w: -1.3 m/s)	
2nd place, silver medalist(s)	Nastassia Mironchyk	Belarus	6.10 (w: -0.8 m/s)	6.23 (w: -0.6 m/s)	6.46 (w: -1.3 m/s)	6.11 (w: -1.3 m/s)	6.42 (w: -1.5 m/s)	6.14 (w: -0.1 m/s)	6.46 (w: -1.3 m/s)	
3rd place, bronze medalist(s)	Dailenis Alcántara	Cuba	6.05 (w: -1.1 m/s)	6.24 (w: -2.1 m/s)	6.32 (w: -1.6 m/s)	6.30 (w: -1.6 m/s)	x	6.41 (w: -1.9 m/s)	6.41 (w: -1.9 m/s)	
4	Ksenia Achkinadze	Germany	3.01 (w: -1.0 m/s)	6.09 (w: -1.3 m/s)	6.33 (w: -2.2 m/s)	x	x	6.17 (w: -1.0 m/s)	6.33 (w: -2.2 m/s)	
5	Arantxa King	Bermuda	x	6.17 (w: -2.6 m/s)	6.22 (w: -0.6 m/s)	6.31 (w: -1.2 m/s)	6.09 (w: -1.0 m/s)	6.30 (w: -1.2 m/s)	6.31 (w: -1.2 m/s)	
6	Eileen Matthes	Germany	5.81 (w: -1.7 m/s)	6.01 (w: -1.6 m/s)	6.28 (w: -1.4 m/s)	6.24 (w: -0.4 m/s)	6.17 (w: -1.9 m/s)	5.96 (w: -0.2 m/s)	6.28 (w: -1.4 m/s)	
7	Anna Jagaciak	Poland	x	6.20 (w: -2.3 m/s)	4.71 (w: -0.7 m/s)	6.27 (w: -2.0 m/s)	6.17 (w: -1.1 m/s)	6.00 (w: -0.7 m/s)	6.27 (w: -2.0 m/s)	
8	Abigail Irozuru	United Kingdom	5.95 (w: -0.1 m/s)	6.16 (w: -1.7 m/s)	x	3.63 (w: -2.0 m/s)	x	5.97 (w: -0.8 m/s)	6.16 (w: -1.7 m/s)	
9	Cristina Sandu	Romania	x	5.99 (w: -1.0 m/s)	5.98 (w: -1.1 m/s)				5.99 (w: -1.0 m/s)	
10	Dóra Végvári	Hungary	5.87 (w: -0.8 m/s)	5.92 (w: -1.4 m/s)	5.83 (w: -1.2 m/s)				5.92 (w: -1.4 m/s)	
11	Daniella Sacama Isidore	France	5.65 (w: -1.7 m/s)	5.83 (w: -0.3 m/s)	x				5.83 (w: -0.3 m/s)	
12	Svetlana Fomina	Russia	5.76 (w: -0.9 m/s)	x	x				5.76 (w: -0.9 m/s)	

=== Qualifications ===
11 July

==== Group A ====
Rank	Name	Nationality	Attempts			Result	Notes
Rank	Name	Nationality	1	2	3	Result	Notes
1	Ksenia Achkinadze	Germany	6.17 (w: -2.4 m/s)	6.43 (w: -1.4 m/s)	-	6.43 (w: -1.4 m/s)	Q
2	Arantxa King	Bermuda	6.28 (w: -1.6 m/s)	-	-	6.28 (w: -1.6 m/s)	Q
2	Anna Jagaciak	Poland	6.28 (w: -0.3 m/s)	-	-	6.28 (w: -0.3 m/s)	Q
4	Nastassia Mironchyk	Belarus	6.13 (w: -0.9 m/s)	6.23 (w: -1.8 m/s)	6.15 (w: -1.2 m/s)	6.23 (w: -1.8 m/s)	q
5	Daniella Sacama Isidore	France	6.12 (w: -1.6 m/s)	5.66 (w: -2.5 m/s)	5.83 (w: -1.5 m/s)	6.12 (w: -1.6 m/s)	q
6	Svetlana Fomina	Russia	x	6.10 (w: -2.1 m/s)	5.91 (w: -2.4 m/s)	6.10 (w: -2.1 m/s)	q
7	Dóra Végvári	Hungary	6.02 (w: -1.6 m/s)	x	6.05 (w: -0.5 m/s)	6.05 (w: -0.5 m/s)	q
8	Abigail Irozuru	United Kingdom	x	6.04 (w: -0.8 m/s)	5.91 (w: -1.7 m/s)	6.04 (w: -0.8 m/s)	q
9	Caroline Lundahl	Sweden	5.80 (w: -1.1 m/s)	5.83 (w: -2.1 m/s)	6.04 (w: -2.0 m/s)	6.04 (w: -2.0 m/s)	
10	Shakia Forbes	United States	5.97 (w: -1.7 m/s)	5.87 (w: -2.5 m/s)	5.97 (w: -1.4 m/s)	5.97 (w: -1.7 m/s)	
11	Larissa Perry	Australia	4.68 (w: -1.6 m/s)	5.80 (w: -2.7 m/s)	5.87 (w: -0.9 m/s)	5.87 (w: -0.9 m/s)	
12	Carola van Wagtendonk	Netherlands	x	5.72 (w: -1.9 m/s)	5.83 (w: -2.1 m/s)	5.83 (w: -2.1 m/s)	

==== Group B ====
Rank	Name	Nationality	Attempts			Result	Notes
Rank	Name	Nationality	1	2	3	Result	Notes
1	Ivana Španović	Serbia	6.51 (w: -1.7 m/s)	-	-	6.51 (w: -1.7 m/s)	Q
2	Eileen Matthes	Germany	6.03 (w: -1.1 m/s)	4.50 (w: -1.3 m/s)	6.19 (w: -2.2 m/s)	6.19 (w: -2.2 m/s)	q
3	Cristina Sandu	Romania	x	6.08 (w: -2.6 m/s)	x	6.08 (w: -2.6 m/s)	q
4	Dailenis Alcántara	Cuba	5.99 (w: -0.4 m/s)	6.05 (w: -2.1 m/s)	6.05 (w: -1.7 m/s)	6.05 (w: -2.1 m/s)	q
5	Sheriffa Whyte	Saint Kitts and Nevis	5.92 (w: -3.1 m/s)	x	5.96 (w: -2.4 m/s)	5.96 (w: -2.4 m/s)	
6	Natalya Malmalayeva	Kazakhstan	5.88 (w: -3.2 m/s)	x	5.88 (w: -1.2 m/s)	5.88 (w: -3.2 m/s)	
7	Jamesha Youngblood	United States	x	5.67 (w: -1.0 m/s)	5.82 (w: -1.0 m/s)	5.82 (w: -1.0 m/s)	
8	Milena Mitkova	Bulgaria	5.81 (w: -1.5 m/s)	5.64 (w: -1.8 m/s)	x	5.81 (w: -1.5 m/s)	
9	Fabiola Taylor	Dominican Republic	5.40 (w: -1.5 m/s)	5.68 (w: -4.3 m/s)	5.76 (w: -2.3 m/s)	5.76 (w: -2.3 m/s)	
10	Mariya Shumilova	Russia	5.70 (w: -1.0 m/s)	x	-	5.70 (w: -1.0 m/s)	
11	Christy Coetzee	South Africa	5.27 (w: -0.2 m/s)	5.37 (w: -1.8 m/s)	5.56 (w: -1.4 m/s)	5.56 (w: -1.4 m/s)	
12	Keshia Willix	France	5.56 (w: -0.7 m/s)	x	-	5.56 (w: -0.7 m/s)	

== Participation ==
According to an unofficial count, 24 athletes from 20 countries participated in the event.

- Australia (1)
- Belarus (1)
- Bermuda (1)
- Bulgaria (1)
- Cuba (1)
- Dominican Republic (1)
- France (2)
- Germany (2)
- Hungary (1)
- Kazakhstan (1)
- Netherlands (1)
- Poland (1)
- Romania (1)
- Russia (2)
- Saint Kitts and Nevis (1)
- Serbia (1)
- South Africa (1)
- Sweden (1)
- United Kingdom (1)
- United States (2)
