= 2019 European Athletics Indoor Championships – Women's long jump =

The women's long jump event at the 2019 European Athletics Indoor Championships was held on 2 March at 10:00 (qualification) and 3 March at 18:00 (final) local time.

== Medalists ==
| Gold | Silver | Bronze |
|---|---|---|
| Ivana Španović; Serbia | Nastassia Mironchyk-Ivanova; Belarus | Maryna Bekh-Romanchuk; Ukraine |

== Records ==
Standing records prior to the 2019 European Athletics Indoor Championships
| World record | Heike Drechsler (GDR) | 7.37 | Vienna, Austria | 13 February 1988 |
| European record | Heike Drechsler (GDR) | 7.37 | Vienna, Austria | 13 February 1988 |
| Championship record | Heike Drechsler (GDR) | 7.30 | Budapest, Hungary | 5 March 1988 |
| World Leading | Malaika Mihambo (GER) | 6.99 | Berlin, Germany | 1 February 2019 |
| European Leading | Malaika Mihambo (GER) | 6.99 | Berlin, Germany | 1 February 2019 |

== Results ==
=== Qualification ===
Qualification: Qualifying performance 6.65 (Q) or at least 8 best performers (q) advance to the Final

| Rank | Athlete | Nationality | #1 | #2 | #3 | Result | Note |
|---|---|---|---|---|---|---|---|
| 1 | Ivana Španović | Serbia | 6.79 | | | 6.79 | Q |
| 2 | Maryna Bekh-Romanchuk | Ukraine | 6.57 | 6.78 | | 6.78 | Q |
| 3 | Nastassia Mironchyk-Ivanova | Belarus | 6.77 | | | 6.77 | Q, SB |
| 4 | Malaika Mihambo | Germany | 6.74 | | | 6.74 | Q |
| 5 | Tania Vicenzino | Italy | 6.51 | 6.68 | | 6.68 | Q, PB |
| 6 | Alina Rotaru | Romania | 6.45 | 6.66 | | 6.66 | Q |
| 7 | Florentina Costina Iușco | Romania | 6.52 | 6.45 | – | 6.52 | q, SB |
| 8 | Abigail Irozuru | Great Britain | 6.45 | 6.32 | 6.50 | 6.50 | q |
| 9 | Fátima Diame | Spain | 6.25 | x | 6.46 | 6.46 | |
| 10 | Māra Grīva | Latvia | 6.37 | x | 6.41 | 6.41 | =PB |
| 11 | Milica Gardašević | Serbia | 6.30 | x | 6.41 | 6.41 | |
| 12 | Laura Strati | Italy | 6.35 | x | 6.40 | 6.40 | |
| 13 | Éloyse Lesueur-Aymonin | France | 6.22 | 6.37 | 6.31 | 6.37 | |
| 14 | Jahisha Thomas | Great Britain | 6.33 | 6.20 | 6.34 | 6.34 | |
| 15 | Lauma Grīva | Latvia | 6.34 | 6.29 | 6.16 | 6.34 | |
| 16 | Hafdís Sigurðardóttir | Iceland | 6.34 | 6.29 | 6.16 | 6.34 | |
| 17 | Anasztázia Nguyen | Hungary | x | 6.28 | x | 6.28 | |
| 17 | Jazmin Sawyers | Great Britain | x | x | 6.28 | 6.28 | |
| | Hanne Maudens | Belgium | | | | DNS | |

=== Final ===
| Rank | Athlete | Nationality | #1 | #2 | #3 | #4 | #5 | #6 | Result | Note |
|---|---|---|---|---|---|---|---|---|---|---|
| 1st place, gold medalist(s) | Ivana Španovic | Serbia | 6.90 | 6.72 | 6.80 | 6.78 | 6.99 | – | 6.99 | =WL |
| 2nd place, silver medalist(s) | Nastassia Mironchyk-Ivanova | Belarus | 6.93 | x | 6.89 | 6.77 | x | x | 6.93 | PB |
| 3rd place, bronze medalist(s) | Maryna Bekh-Romanchuk | Ukraine | x | x | 6.63 | 6.84 | 6.75 | 6.62 | 6.84 | |
| 4 | Malaika Mihambo | Germany | 6.82 | x | x | 6.83 | x | x | 6.83 | |
| 5 | Alina Rotaru | Romania | 6.36 | x | 6.64 | 6.57 | x | 6.59 | 6.64 | |
| 6 | Tania Vicenzino | Italy | 6.42 | 6.01 | 6.40 | 6.41 | 6.58 | 6.50 | 6.58 | |
| 7 | Abigail Irozuru | Great Britain | 6.41 | x | 6.50 | x | 6.37 | 6.35 | 6.50 | |
| 8 | Florentina Costina Iușco | Romania | x | x | 6.39 | 6.28 | 6.49 | x | 6.49 | |
