= Awards of Olympic Committee of Serbia =

Logo of Olympic Committee of Serbia

Awards of Olympic Committee of Serbia are proclaimed since 1994, at the end of each calendar year, to the most successful athletes. Initially it was awarded to sportswoman and sportsman of the year, but later introduced the award for best the women's team, the men's team, coach and young sportsperson. The competition includes results from current Olympic sports, also and from Chess Olympiad. Trophies are traditionally awarded at a gala evening at the House of the National Assembly. In 2024 most categories were not awarded.

== Criteria for Awards ==
Awards are given to the athletes and teams according to their results in Olympic sports, Paralympic sports and from Chess Olympiad. The most valuable results are those accomplished in these competitions (in this order):

1. Olympic Games
2. World Championship
3. European Championship
4. World Cup
5. European Cup
6. Paralympic Games
7. Chess Olympiad

The award for most successful coach can be awarded to a coach who was a member of one of the Serbian national teams which achieved the most valuable sporting result according to listed criteria.
If two sportspersons have identical results, the award will go to athletes from individual sports instead of team sports. An exception can be made if an athlete from a team sport won an MVP award at the Olympic Games, World Championship or European Championship. Also, the worldwide popularity of their sports can be taken into account, as well as the maximum number of athletes from an individual nation that can participate in competitions.
If there are no exceptional results in given year, the award will not be presented.

== Sportswoman of The Year ==
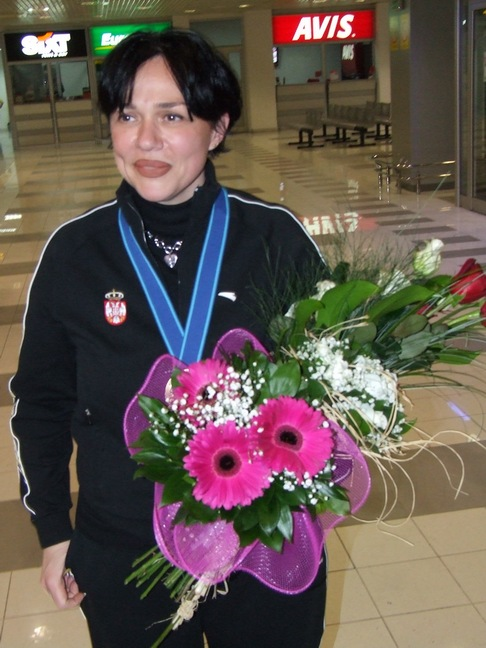
Jasna Šekarić holds the record for most wins with six awards

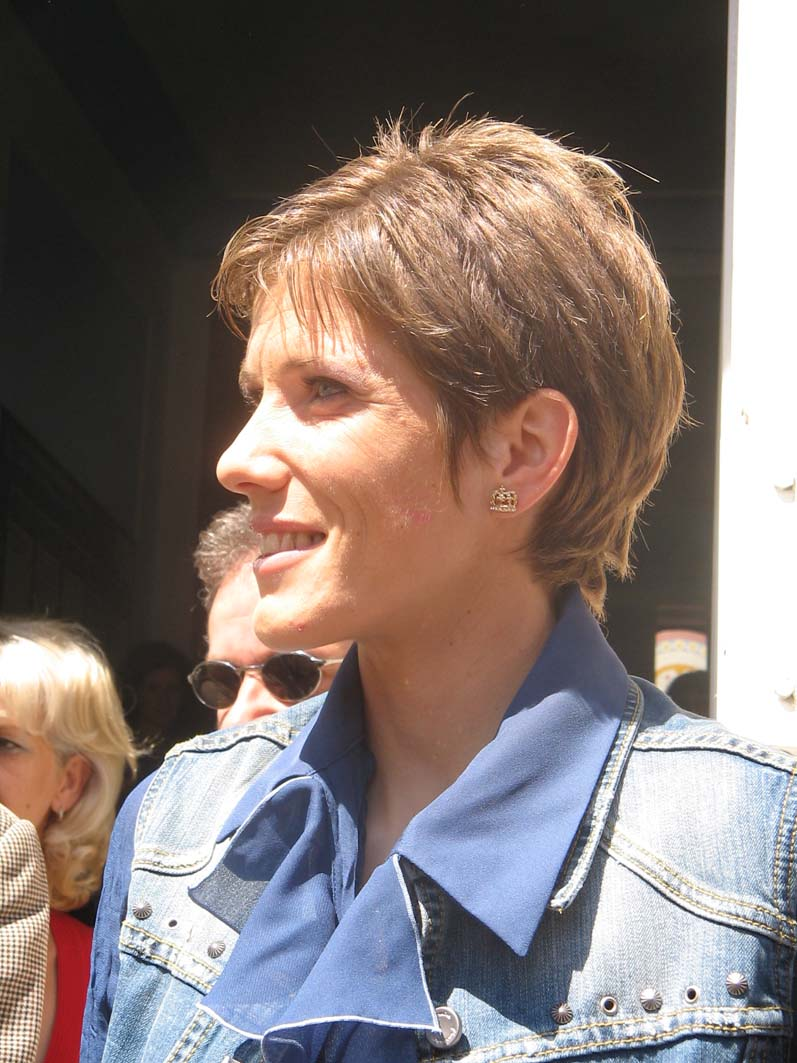
Olivera Jevtić won the award three times

This award is proclaimed since the introduction of awards in 1994. So far it was awarded to 16 different athletes from 10 sports.

Year	Sportswoman of The Year	Sport
1994	Jasna Šekarić	Shooting
1995	Jasna Šekarić (2)	Shooting
1996	Aleksandra Ivošev	Shooting
1997	Jasna Šekarić (3)	Shooting
1998	Olivera Jevtić	Athletics
1999	Olivera Jevtić (2)	Athletics
2000	Jasna Šekarić (4)	Shooting
2001	Jelena Dokić	Tennis
2002	Mara Kovačević	Judo
2003	Silvija Erdelji	Table tennis
2004	Jasna Šekarić (5)	Shooting
2005	Jasna Šekarić (6)	Shooting
2006	Olivera Jevtić (3)	Athletics
2007	Jelena Janković	Tennis
2008	Jelena Janković (2)	Tennis
2009	Nađa Higl	Swimming
2010	Zorana Arunović	Shooting
2011	Jovana Brakočević	Volleyball
2012	Milica Mandić	Taekwondo
2013	Ivana Španović	Athletics
2014	Nikolina Moldovan	Canoeing
2015	Ivana Španović (2)	Athletics
2016	Tijana Bogdanović	Taekwondo
2017	Milica Mandić (2)	Taekwondo
2018	Tijana Bošković	Volleyball
2019	Tijana Bošković (2)	Volleyball
2020	Bobana Veličković	Shooting
2021	Jovana Preković	Karate
2022	Ivana Vuleta (3)	Athletics
2023	Ivana Španović (4)	Athletics
2024	no award	
2025	Angelina Topić	Athletics

== Sportsman of The Year ==
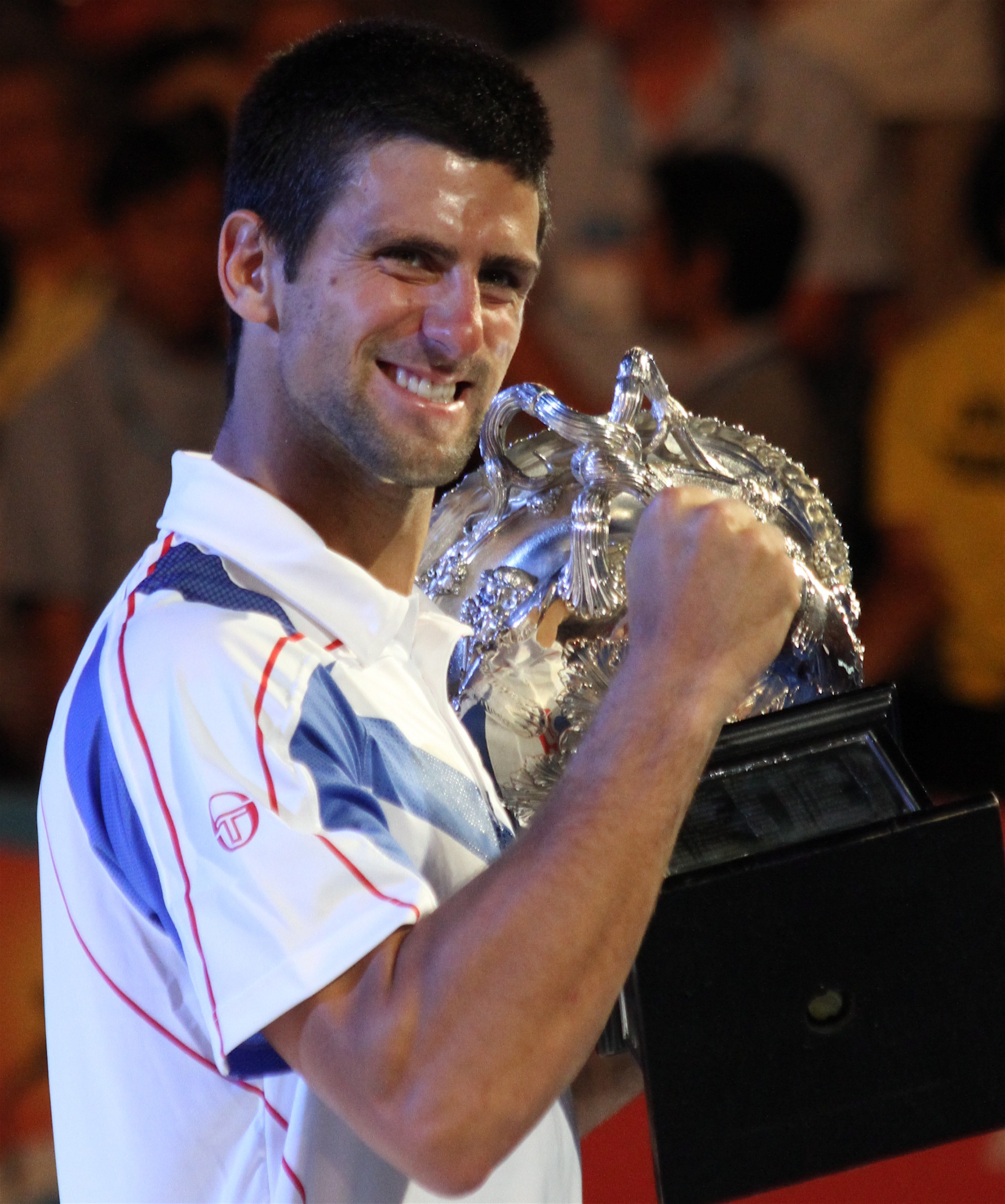
Novak Djokovic holds the record for most wins with ten awards

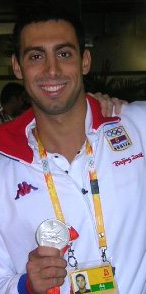
Milorad Čavić won the award three times

This award is proclaimed since the introduction of awards in 1994. So far it was awarded to 17 different athletes from 10 sports.

Year	Sportsman of The Year	Sport
1994	Stevan Pletikosić	Shooting
1995	Aleksandar Đorđević	Basketball
1996	Vladimir Grbić	Volleyball
1997	Nikola Grbić	Volleyball
1998	Dejan Bodiroga	Basketball
1999	Nedeljko Jovanović	Handball
2000	Vladimir Grbić (2)	Volleyball
2001	Aleksandar Šoštar	Water polo
2002	Dejan Bodiroga (2)	Basketball
2003	Milorad Čavić	Swimming
2004	Aleksandar Šapić	Water polo
2005	Vladimir Vujasinović	Water polo
2006	Nikola Stojić	Rowing
2007	Novak Đoković	Tennis
2008	Milorad Čavić (2)	Swimming
2009	Milorad Čavić (3)	Swimming
2010	Novak Đoković (2)	Tennis
2011	Novak Đoković (3)	Tennis
2012	Andrija Prlainović	Water polo
2013	Novak Đoković (4)	Tennis
2014	Novak Đoković (5)	Tennis
2015	Novak Đoković (6)	Tennis
2016	Filip Filipović	Water polo
2017	Milenko Zorić; Marko Tomićević	Canoeing
2018	Novak Đoković (7)	Tennis
2019	Novak Đoković (8)	Tennis
2020	Novak Đoković (9)	Tennis
2021	Filip Filipović (2)	Water polo
2022	Zurabi Datunashvili	Wrestling
2023	Novak Đoković (10)	Tennis
2024	no award	
2025	Aleksandr Komarov	Wrestling

== Team Sport Athlete of The Year ==
This award is introduced in 2022. So far it was awarded to 3 different athletes from 3 sports.

Year	Sportsman of The Year	Sport
2022	Tijana Bošković	Volleyball
2023	Strahinja Stojačić	3x3 basketball
2024	Dušan Mandić	Water polo
2025	Strahinja Stojačić (2)	3x3 basketball

== Young Athlete of The Year ==
This award is introduced in 2011. So far it was awarded to 10 different athletes from 8 sports.

Year	Sportsman of The Year	Sport
2010	Velimir Stjepanović	Swimming
2011	Uroš Kovačević	Volleyball
2012	Dušan Mandić	Water polo
2013	Andrija Šljukić	Rowing
2014	Nemanja Majdov	Judo
2015	Tijana Bogdanović	Taekwondo
2016	Nikola Jakšić	Water polo
2017	Tijana Bošković	Volleyball
2018	Nadica Božanić	Taekwondo
2019	Ivana Perović	Karate
2020	Matija Dinić	Ice hockey
2021	Adriana Vilagoš	Athletics
2022	Adriana Vilagoš (2)	Athletics
2023	Angelina Topić	Athletics
2024	no award	
2025	Milan Bulaja	Judo

== Women's Team of The Year ==
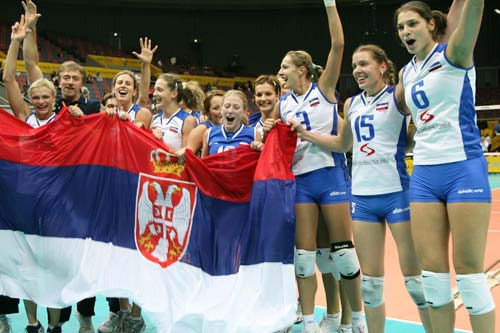
National volleyball team holds the record for most wins with ten awards

This award is introduced in 1995. It was awarded to 10 different teams from 7 different sports.

Year	Women's Team of The Year	Sport
1995	National shooting team	Shooting
1996	Karate club Soko Štark	Karate
1997	Karate club Knjaz Miloš	Karate
1998	ŽRK Budućnost	Handball
1999	National chess team	Chess
2000	no award	
2001	National handball team	Handball
2002	no award	
2003	no award	
2004	no award	
2005	National basketball team	Basketball
2006	National volleyball team	Volleyball
2007	National volleyball team (2)	Volleyball
2008	National volleyball team (3)	Volleyball
2009	National volleyball team (4)	Volleyball
2010	National volleyball team (5)	Volleyball
2011	National volleyball team (6)	Volleyball
2012	Fed cup team	Tennis
2013	National handball team (2)	Handball
2014	no award	
2015	National basketball team (2)	Basketball
2016	National volleyball team (7)	Volleyball
2017	National volleyball team (8)	Volleyball
2018	National volleyball team (9)	Volleyball
2019	National volleyball team (10)	Volleyball
2020	no award	
2021	National volleyball team (11)	Volleyball
2022	National volleyball team (12)	Volleyball
2023	National volleyball team (13)	Volleyball
2024	no award	
2025	no award	

== Men's Team of The Year ==
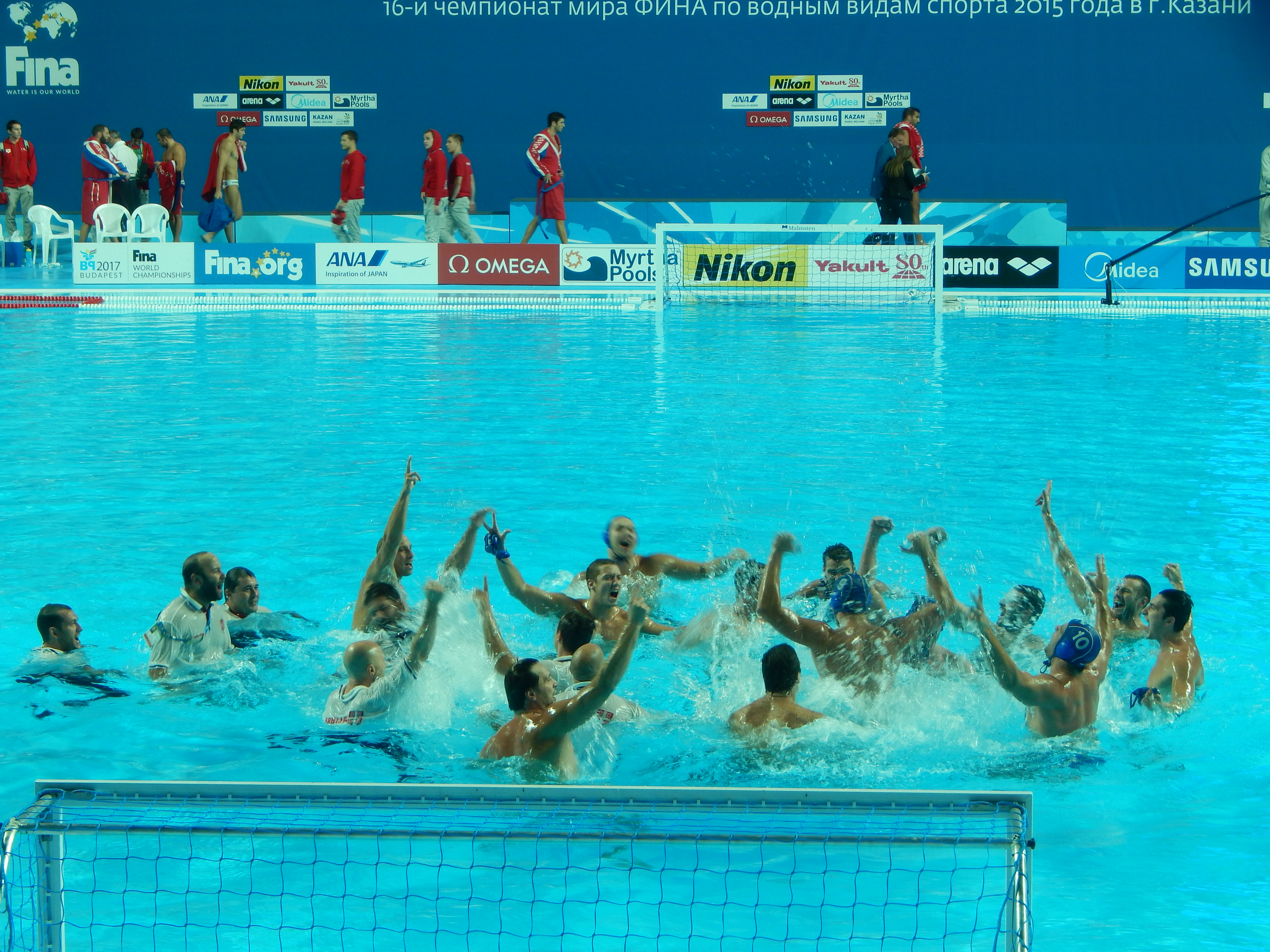
National water polo team holds the record for most wins with fifteen awards

This award is introduced in 1995. It was awarded to 5 different teams from 5 different sports.

Year	Men's Team of The Year	Sport
1995	National basketball team	Basketball
1996	National basketball team (2)	Basketball
1997	National basketball team (3)	Basketball
1998	National basketball team (4)	Basketball
1999	National handball team	Handball
2000	National volleyball team	Volleyball
2001	National water polo team	Water polo
2002	National basketball team (5)	Basketball
2003	National water polo team (2)	Water polo
2004	National water polo team (3)	Water polo
2005	National water polo team (4)	Water polo
2006	National water polo team (5)	Water polo
2007	National water polo team (6)	Water polo
2008	National water polo team (7)	Water polo
2009	National water polo team (8)	Water polo
2010	National volleyball team (2)	Volleyball
2011	National water polo team (9)	Water polo
2012	National water polo team (10)	Water polo
2013	National volleyball team (3)	Volleyball
2014	National basketball team (6)	Basketball
2015	National water polo team (11)	Water polo
2016	National water polo team (12)	Water polo
2017	National water polo team (13)	Water polo
2018	National 3x3 basketball team	3x3 basketball
2019	National volleyball team (4)	Volleyball
2020	no award	
2021	National water polo team (14)	Water polo
2022	National 3x3 basketball team (2)	3x3 basketball
2023	National 3x3 basketball team (3)	3x3 basketball
2024	National water polo team (15)	Water polo
2025	National 3x3 basketball team (4)	3x3 basketball

== Coach of The Year ==
This award is introduced in 2009. It was awarded to 10 different coaches from 8 different sports.

Year	Coach of The Year	Sport
2009	Dejan Udovičić	Water polo
2010	Marián Vajda	Tennis
2011	Marián Vajda (2)	Tennis
2012	Dragan Jović	Taekwondo
2013	Saša Bošković	Handball
2014	Dragan Plavšić	Canoeing
2015	Dejan Savić	Water polo
2016	Dejan Savić (2)	Water polo
2017	Dragan Jović (2)	Taekwondo
2018	Zoran Terzić	Volleyball
2019	Slobodan Kovač	Volleyball
2020	Jasna Šekarić	Shooting
2021	Dragan Jović (3)	Taekwondo
2022	Dragan Jović (4)	Taekwondo
2023	Goran Obradović	Athletics
2024	Uroš Stevanović	Water polo
2025	Vojislav Trajković	Wrestling

== Olympic Heart "General Đukić" ==
This award is introduced in 2017 as the Lifetime Achievement Award.

Year	Coach of The Year	Sport
2017	Vladimir Cvetković	Basketball
2018	Jasna Šekarić	Shooting
2019	Aleksandar Boričić	Volleyball
2020	Ivanka Gajić	Basketball
2021	Dragan Radovanović	Basketball
2022	Dušan Maravić	Football
2023	Boriša Simanić	Basketball
2024	no award	
2025	Žarko Zečević	Basketball

== See also ==
- Serbian Sports personality of the Year
