= Athletics at the 2007 European Youth Summer Olympic Festival =

The athletics competition at the 2007 European Youth Summer Olympic Festival was held from 23 to 27 July. The events took place in Belgrade, Serbia. Boys and girls born 1990 or 1991 or later participated 34 track and field events, with similar programmes for the sexes with the exception of no steeplechase or hammer throw event for girls.

The event was held shortly after the 2007 World Youth Championships in Athletics. Mykyta Nesterenko (discus throw) and Darya Klishina (long jump) were the only two reigning world youth champions to come and win at the European competition. Three athletes completed individual doubles: Ramil Guliyev and Eliza Vildanova did a short sprint double in the girls' and boys' divisions, respectively, and Daniela Fetcere claimed both the girls' middle-distance running titles.

Several of the participants later went on to reach the pinnacle of the sport. Klishina became the European indoor champion in 2013, but minor medallists also went on to greater acclaim: Ekaterina Zavyalova won an Olympic medal in 2012, Ivana Španović was a 2013 World Championships medallist, and discus thrower Sandra Perković (runner-up here) went on to win Olympic, World and European titles.

== Medal summary ==
=== Men ===
Event	Gold		Silver		Bronze	
100 metres (wind: +2.3 m/s)	Ramil Guliyev (AZE)	10.50 w	Eugene Ayanful (GBR)	10.67 w	Eusebio Cáceres (ESP)	10.73 w
200 metres	Ramil Guliyev (AZE)	20.98	Andrew Robertson (GBR)	21.72	Mindaugas Baliukonis (LTU)	21.78
400 metres	Vladimir Krasnov (RUS)	47.11	Roman Turčáni (SVK)	47.75	Ville Wendelin (FIN)	48.41
800 metres	Aleksandr Sheplyakov (RUS)	1:51.37	Emrah Çoban (TUR)	1:51.92	Samir Dahmani (FRA)	1:52.39
1500 metres	David Bustos (ESP)	3:53.24	Cihat Ulus (TUR)	3:53.85	Dániel Kállay (HUN)	3:54.59
3000 metres	Dieter Vanstreels (BEL)	8:31.94	Gergo Szoke (HUN)	8:34.02	Resul Çevik (TUR)	8:34.89
110 metres hurdles	Cornel Bananau (ROU)	13.83	Dominik Distelberger (AUT)	13.85	Andreas Martinsen (DEN)	13.96
400 metres hurdles	Nikita Andriyanov (RUS)	51.89	Jarno Boutkam (NED)	52.98	Felix Rupprecht (GER)	53.17
2000 metres steeplechase	Andreas Van Ham (BEL)	5:50.90	Noel Collins (IRL)	5:52.06	Antonio Abadía (ESP)	5:54.92
4 × 100 m relay	Great Britain (GBR); James McLean; Wayne Ashall; Eugene Ayanful; Andrew Robertson	41.62	Estonia (EST); Kaarel Jõeväli; Andres Saaremöts; Sander Sooäär; Richard Pulst	41.70	Netherlands (NED); Philip Lindell; Martjin Hoogendam; Joeri Jaegers; Stijn Ram	41.73
High jump	Sergey Mudrov (RUS)	2.20 m	Miguel Sancho (ESP)	2.14 m	Kourosh Fouroghi (IRL)	2.08 m
Pole vault	Hugo Dupressoir (FRA)	4.90 m	Dmitriy Zhelyabin (RUS)	4.80 m	Michael Kass (GER)	4.70 m
Long jump	Dino Pervan (CRO)	7.49 m	Łukasz Pabich (POL)	7.36 m	Gianluca Levantino (ITA)	7.27 m
Triple jump	Anvar Zeynalzade (AZE)	15.56 m	Martinš Dakša (LAT)	15.30 m	Gaetan Saku Bafuanga (FRA)	15.21 m
Shot put	Marin Premeru (CRO)	21.23 m	Dmitriy Savytskyy (UKR)	19.76 m	Tobias Ernst (GER)	19.46 m
Discus throw	Mykyta Nesterenko (UKR)	72.31 m	Marin Premeru (CRO)	68.20 m	Andrius Gudžius (LTU)	60.07 m
Javelin throw	Edgars Rütinš (LAT)	71.87 m	Kirill Kadukov (RUS)	71.47 m	Stipe Zunic (CRO)	70.98 m

=== Women ===
Event	Gold		Silver		Bronze	
100 metres	Elza Vildanova (RUS)	11.68	Torema Dorsett (GBR)	11.69	Niamh Whelan (IRL)	11.87
200 metres	Elza Vildanova (RUS)	23.75	Valentine Arrieta (SUI)	24.13	Lara Hoffmann (GER)	24.16
400 metres	Alexandra Štuková (SVK)	54.18	Yuliya Terekhova (RUS)	54.32	Olga Zemlyak (UKR)	55.06
800 metres	Florina Pierdevara (ROU)	2:07.41	Olga Bibik (UKR)	2:07.55	Yekaterina Zavyalova (RUS)	2:08.06
1500 metres	Daniela Fetcere (LAT)	4:26.60	Nina Kramer (GER)	4:29.29	Réka Czebei (HUN)	4:30.19
3000 metres	Daniela Fetcere (LAT)	9:30.65	Charlotte Ffrench-O'Carroll (IRL)	9:37.89	Réka Czebei (HUN)	9:46.44
100 metres hurdles	Mila Andrić (SRB)	13.69	Lucie Cincinatis (BEL)	13.78	Ivana Lončarek (CRO)	13.80
400 metres hurdles	Leonie Schilder (NED)	59.44	Mila Andrić (SRB)	59.62	Anna Raukuc (GER)	59.75
4 × 100 m relay	Switzerland (SUI); Andrea Gilgen; Valentine Arrieta; Grace Muamba; Léa Sprunger	46.17	France (FRA); Yariatou Touré; Jessie Saint-Marc; Floria Gueï; Mary Gould Dupuit	46.43	Serbia (SRB); Angela Terek; Kristina Jevtić; Andrijana Andrić; Ivana Španović	46.85
High jump	Elena Vallortigara (ITA)	1.86 m	Natalya Mamlina (RUS)	1.83 m	Oksana Okunyeva (UKR)	1.77 m
Pole vault	Lyudmila Yeremina (RUS)	3.95 m	Denise Groot (NED)	3.90 m	Dana Cižková (SVK)	3.85 m
Long jump	Darya Klishina (RUS)	6.43 m	Ivana Španović (SRB)	6.20 m	Els De Wael (BEL)	6.12 m
Triple jump	Cristina Sandu (ROU)	12.98 m	Maja Bratkic (SLO)	12.89 m	Mia Haave (NOR)	12.67 m
Shot put	Lina Berends (GER)	14.73 m	Aliona Hryshko (BLR)	14.57 m	Vera Kunova (RUS)	13.99 m
Discus throw	Irina Rodrigues (POR)	51.74 m	Sandra Perković (CRO)	49.70 m	Katja Dingelstedt (GER)	47.12 m
Javelin throw	Tatjana Jelača (SRB)	51.80 m	Anna Habina (UKR)	49.58 m	Maria Jensen (DEN)	47.16 m
