= 2022 European Athletics Championships – Women's long jump =

Women's long jump at the 2022 European Athletics Championships
- Venue: Olympiastadion
- Location: Munich
- Dates: 16 August (qualification); 18 August (final)
- Competitors: 24 from 16 nations
- Winning distance: 7.06

Medalists
gold medal	Ivana Vuleta	Serbia
silver medal	Malaika Mihambo	Germany
bronze medal	Jazmin Sawyers	Great Britain

The women's long jump at the 2022 European Athletics Championships took place at the Olympiastadion on 16 and 18 August.

== Records ==
Standing records prior to the 2022 European Athletics Championships
World record	Galina Chistyakova (URS)	7.52 m	Leningrad, Soviet Union	11 June 1988
European record	Galina Chistyakova (URS)	7.52 m	Leningrad, Soviet Union	11 June 1988
Championship record	Heike Drechsler (GDR)	7.30 m	Split, Yugoslavia	28 August 1990
World Leading	Brooke Buschkuehl (AUS)	7.13 m	Chula Vista, United States	9 July 2022
Europe Leading	Malaika Mihambo (GER)	7.12 m	Eugene, United States	24 July 2022

== Schedule ==
Date	Time	Round
16 August 2022	9:50	Qualification
18 August 2022	21:08	Final

All times are local times (UTC+2)

== Results ==
=== Qualification ===
Qualification: 6.75 m (Q) or best 12 performers (q)

Rank	Group	Name	Nationality	#1	#2	#3	Result	Note
1	A	Malaika Mihambo	Germany	x	6.99		6.99	Q
2	A	Maryna Bekh-Romanchuk	Ukraine	x	x	6.87	6.87	Q, SB
3	A	Milica Gardašević	Serbia	6.83			6.83	Q, =PB
4	B	Ivana Vuleta	Serbia	x	6.53	6.67	6.67	q
5	B	Larissa Iapichino	Italy	6.63	–	–	6.63	q
6	A	Jazmin Sawyers	Great Britain	x	6.60	r	6.60	q
7	B	Khaddi Sagnia	Sweden	6.19	6.41	6.59	6.59	q
8	B	Alina Rotaru	Romania	x	6.32	6.58	6.58	q
9	A	Yanis David	France	6.44	6.51	6.57	6.57	q
10	B	Jahisha Thomas	Great Britain	6.38	6.57	x	6.57	q, SB
11	A	Filippa Fotopoulou	Cyprus	6.54	x	6.52	6.54	q
12	B	Merle Homeier	Germany	6.49	x	x	6.49	q
13	A	Mikaelle Assani	Germany	x	6.43	6.46	6.46	
14	A	Jogailė Petrokaitė	Lithuania	x	6.37	x	6.37	
15	A	Irati Mitxelena	Spain	6.14	6.34	6.36	6.36	
16	B	Vasiliki Chaitidou	Greece	6.22	6.32	6.02	6.32	
17	A	Diana Lesti	Hungary	x	6.29	x	6.29	
18	B	Maryse Luzolo	Germany	6.28	x	6.20	6.28	
19	B	Evelise Veiga	Portugal	x	6.17	x	6.17	
20	B	Abigail Irozuru	Great Britain	x	x	6.15	6.15	
21	B	Anna Matuszewicz	Poland	x	5.93	x	5.93	
22	A	Claire Azzopardi	Malta	5.60	5.54	x	5.60	
	B	Maelly Dalmat	France	x	x	x	NM	
	A	Florentina Iusco	Romania	x	x	x	NM	

=== Final ===
Rank	Name	Nationality	#1	#2	#3	#4	#5	#6	Result	Note
1st place, gold medalist(s)	Ivana Vuleta	Serbia	7.06	6.98	x	x	x	–	7.06	=SB
2nd place, silver medalist(s)	Malaika Mihambo	Germany	6.71	7.03	6.86	6.95	x	6.99	7.03	
3rd place, bronze medalist(s)	Jazmin Sawyers	Great Britain	6.69 w	6.52	6.37	x	x	6.80	6.80	
4	Maryna Bekh-Romanchuk	Ukraine	6.70	6.62	6.76	x	6.74	x	6.76	
5	Larissa Iapichino	Italy	6.53	x	x	6.60	6.62	6.28	6.62	
6	Khaddi Sagnia	Sweden	x	6.26	6.47	6.55	6.61	6.51	6.61	
7	Milica Gardašević	Serbia	x	6.52	5.22	x	x	x	6.52	
8	Yanis David	France	6.43	6.38	6.38	6.38	6.49	6.51	6.51	
9	Merle Homeier	Germany	x	6.42	6.31				6.42	
10	Jahisha Thomas	Great Britain	6.37	6.35	x				6.37	
11	Alina Rotaru	Romania	6.26	6.23	6.07				6.26	
12	Filippa Fotopoulou	Cyprus	x	6.10	6.26				6.26	
