= Alexandra Wester =

German long jumper

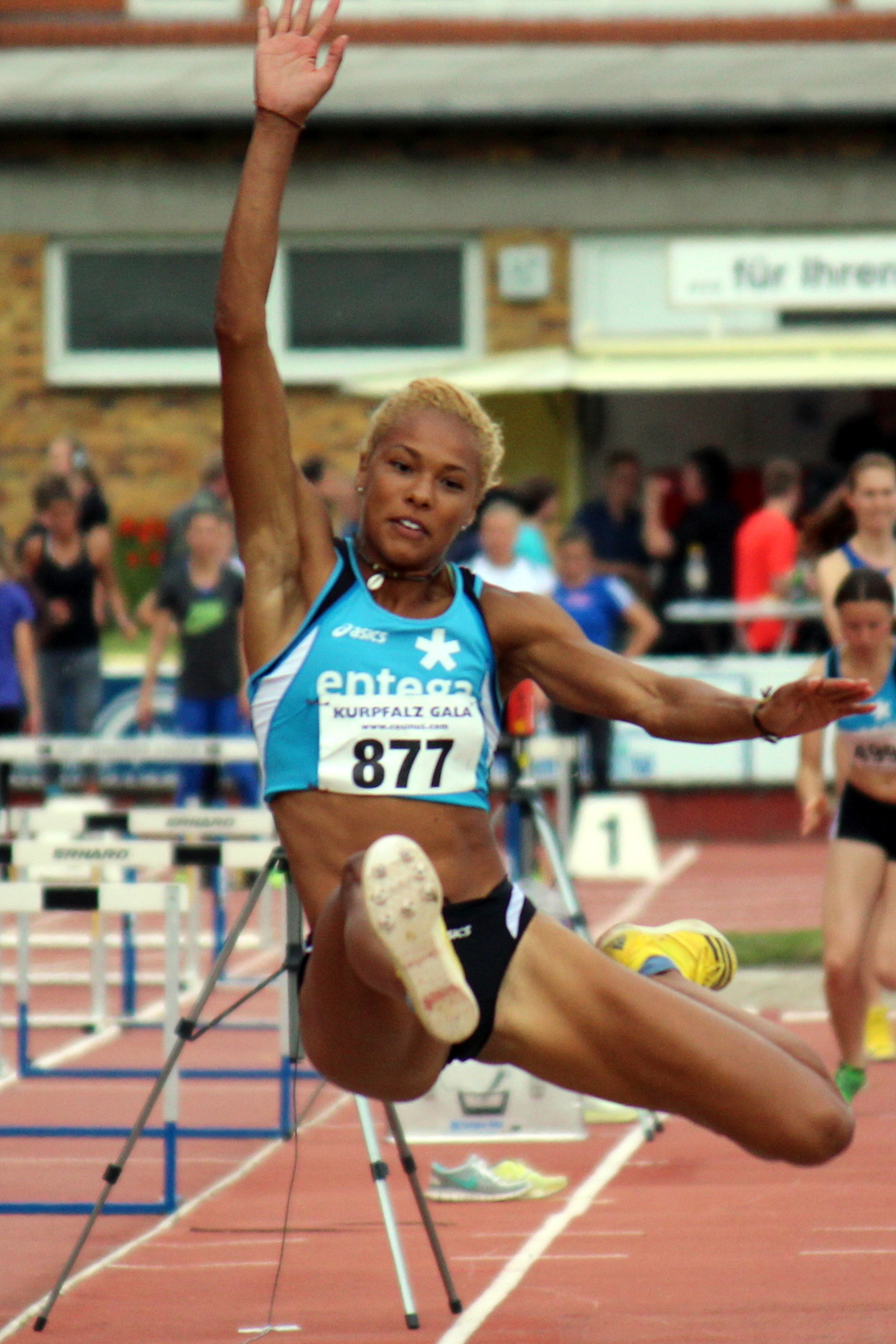

Personal information
- Full name: Alexandra Valerie Wester
- Nickname: Alex
- Born: 21 March 1994 (age 32) Bakau, The Gambia
- Height: 1.80 m (5 ft 11 in)

Sport
- Country: Germany
- Sport: Athletics
- Event: Long jump
- College team: University of Miami
- Club: Africa United Sports Club
- Coached by: Ulrich Knapp

Alexandra Valerie Wester (born 21 March 1994) is a German athlete specialising in the long jump. She made her major competition debut at the 2016 World Indoor Championships finishing sixth.

She was born in The Gambia to a German father and a Ghanaian mother. Earlier in her career, she competed in combined events but decided to specialise in the long jump after problems with injuries.

Her personal bests in the event are 6.79 metres outdoors (Oberteuringen 2016) and 6.95 metres indoors (Berlin 2016).

== Competition record ==
Year	Competition	Venue	Position	Event	Notes
Representing Germany
2016	World Indoor Championships	Portland, United States	6th	Long jump	6.67 m
2016	European Championships	Amsterdam, Netherlands	7th	Long jump	6.51 m
2016	Olympic Games	Rio de Janeiro, Brazil	34th (q)	Long jump	5.98 m
2017	European Indoor Championships	Belgrade, Serbia	8th	Long jump	6.53 m
2017	World Championships	London, United Kingdom	23rd (q)	Long jump	6.27 m
2018	European Championships	Berlin, Germany	15th (q)	Long jump	6.55 m
