= Khaddi Sagnia =

Swedish long jumper (born 1994)

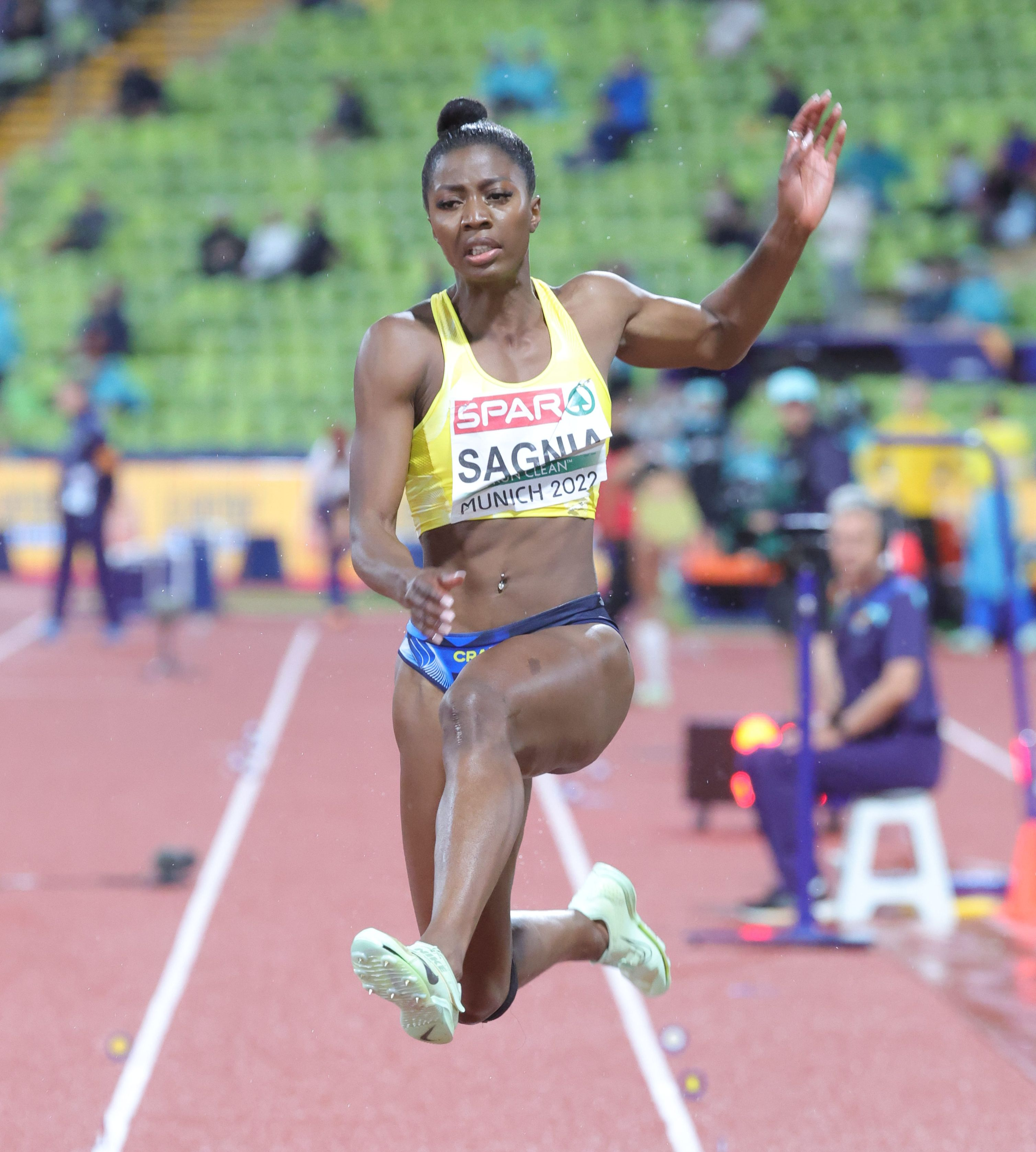
- Sagnia in 2022

Personal information
- Full name: Khadijatou Victoria Sagnia
- Born: 20 April 1994 (age 32) Helsingborg, Sweden
- Height: 5 ft 8 in (1.73 m)
Medal record
Women's athletics
Representing Sweden
European Indoor Championships
Bronze medal – third place	2021 Toruń	Long jump
Summer Youth Olympic Games
Gold medal – first place	2010 Singapore	Triple jump

Khadijatou "Khaddi" Victoria Sagnia (born 20 April 1994) is a Swedish track and field athlete specialising in the long jump. Her personal bests in the event are 6.95 metres outdoors (Diamond League Nike Prefontaine Classic – Eugene, Oregon USA 2022) and 6.92 metres indoors (Glasgow 2018). She competes for Ullevi FK.

In 2021, Sagnia won the bronze medal in the long jump event at the European Indoors Championships in Torun, Poland with a leap of 6.75m. This was her first podium finish at the senior level. She won the gold medal in triple jump at the Youth Olympics in 2010. She has competed as a long jumper at the 2016 and 2020 Summer Olympic Games.

== Biography ==
Growing up, Sagnia was very much into sports, participating in football, basketball, handball and even taekwondo. In 2010, she competed at the Youth Olympic Games in Singapore, where she won the gold medal in the triple jump final.

Following her success at the Youth Olympic Games, she took part at the World Youth Championships in Lille, France. However, she tore her ACL in her knee and was sidelined for two years.

In 2015, she returned to track and field taking part at the European Athletics Indoor Championships and the IAAF World Youth Championships.

Sagnia made it to the world stage when she represented Sweden at the 2016 Olympic Games in Rio de Janeiro, Brazil. Despite not having a very impressive performance at the games, she bounced back at the 2020 Olympic Games in Tokyo, Japan finishing in the 9th position.

Sagnia started with track and field in 2007 and has developed as an athlete at a very fast pace. Even before attending Youth Olympic Games she had represented the senior national team.

As well as being a Nike athlete, she is also an ambassador for Atea, Nocco Beverage and Gainomax health and lifestyle products.

== Personal life ==
Her mother Sutay was born in Gambia but grew up in Sweden. Khaddi Sagnia has seven siblings.

== Competition record ==
Year	Competition	Venue	Position	Event	Notes
Representing Sweden
2010	Youth Olympic Games	Singapore	1st	Triple jump	13.56 m
2011	World Youth Championships	Lille, France	11th	Long jump	5.75 m
2011	World Youth Championships	Lille, France	9th	Triple jump	12.72 m (w)
2015	European Indoor Championships	Prague, Czech Republic	9th (q)	Long jump	6.52 m
2015	European U23 Championships	Tallinn, Estonia	4th	Long jump	6.64 m
2015	World Championships	Beijing, China	7th	Long jump	6.78 m
2016	World Indoor Championships	Portland, United States	14th	Long jump	6.08 m
2016	European Championships	Amsterdam, Netherlands	6th	Long jump	6.59 m
2016	Olympic Games	Rio de Janeiro, Brazil	27th (q)	Long jump	6.25 m
2017	World Championships	London, United Kingdom	16th (q)	Long jump	6.42 m
2018	World Indoor Championships	Birmingham, United Kingdom	6th	Long jump	6.64 m
2018	European Championships	Berlin, Germany	7th	Long jump	6.47 m
2021	European Indoor Championships	Toruń, Poland	3rd	Long jump	6.75 m
2021	Olympic Games	Tokyo, Japan	9th	Long jump	6.67 m
2022	World Indoor Championships	Belgrade, Serbia	12th	Long jump	6.42 m
2022	World Championships	Eugene, United States	6th	Long jump	6.87 m
2022	European Championships	Munich, Germany	6th	Long jump	6.61 m
2023	European Indoor Championships	Istanbul, Turkey	7th	Long jump	6.57 m
2023	World Championships	Budapest, Hungary	28th (q)	Long jump	6.35 m
2025	World Championships	Tokyo, Japan	17th (q)	Long jump	6.48 m
2026	World Indoor Championships	Toruń, Poland	4th	Long jump	6.78 m
