= Larissa Iapichino =

Italian long jumper (born 2002)

Personal information
- National team: Italy
- Born: 18 July 2002 (age 24) Borgo San Lorenzo, Italy
- Height: 1.71 m (5 ft 7 in)
- Weight: 56 kg (123 lb)

Sport
- Sport: Athletics
- Event: Long jump
- Club: Atletica Firenze Marathon; G.A. Fiamme Gialle (2021-)
- Coached by: Gianni Cecconi (2019-2021); Gianni Iapichino (2021- )

Achievements and titles
- Personal bests: Long jump: 7.12 m (2026); Long jump indoor: 6.97 m (2023) NR
Medal record
Women's athletics
Representing Italy
World Ultimate Championship
First place	2026 Budapest	Long jump
World Indoor Championships
Silver medal – second place	2026 Toruń	Long jump
Diamond League
First place	2024	Long jump
First place	2025	Long jump
European Championships
Gold medal – first place	2026 Birmingham	Long jump
Silver medal – second place	2024 Rome	Long jump
European Indoor Championships
Gold medal – first place	2025 Apeldoorn	Long jump
Silver medal – second place	2023 Istanbul	Long jump
European Games
Bronze medal – third place	2023 Kraków-Małopolska	Long jump
European U20 Championships
Gold medal – first place	2019 Borås	Long jump

Larissa Iapichino (Italian pronunciation: [laˈrissa japiˈkiːno]; born 18 July 2002) is an Italian long jumper. She has won silver medals at the 2023 European Indoor Championships, the 2024 European Athletics Outdoor Championships and at the 2026 World Indoor Championships; she was also the gold medallist at the 2025 European Athletics Indoor Championships.

== Biography ==
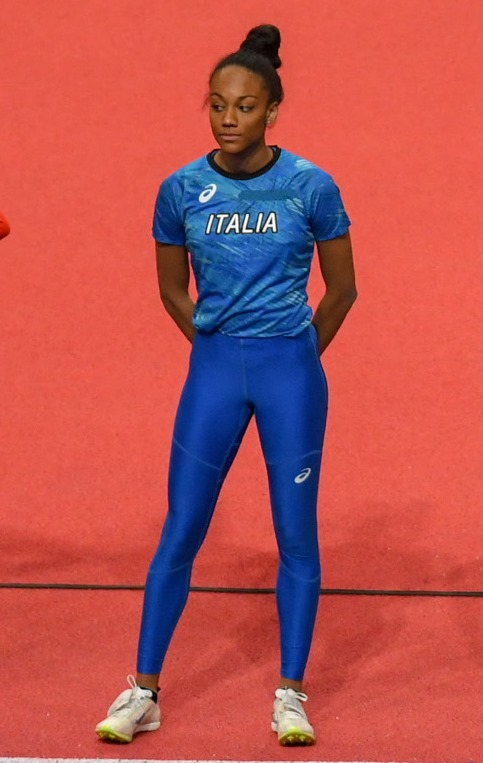
Larissa at Belgrade 2022.

She is the daughter of former pole vaulter Gianni Iapichino and former long jumper Fiona May, who was a two time Olympic silver medalist. In 2020 at under-20 level her personal best, 6.80 m, was the 5th best world performance of 2020 and 2nd all-time in Italy lists at senior level, 4th all time U20 worldwide at first year of category.

== Career ==
She started her youth career winning gold medal at the 2019 European Athletics U20 Championships. On 20 February 2021, Iapichino jumped 6.91 m (22 ft 8 in); a World Record Under-20 years.

== Statistics ==
=== World record ===
Under 20

- Long jump: 6.91 m – (Italy) Ancona, 20 February 2021

=== National records ===
Senior

- Long jump indoor: 6.97 m - (Turkey) Istanbul, 5 March 2023

Under 20

- Long jump: 6.80 m – (Italy) Savona, 16 July 2020

=== Achievements ===
Year	Competition	Venue	Position	Event	Measure	Notes
2018	European U18 Championships	(Hungary) Győr	7th	Long jump	6.12 m	
2019	European U20 Championships	(Sweden) Borås	1st	Long jump	6.58 m	
2021	European Indoor Championships	(Poland) Toruń	5th	Long jump	6.59 m	(Note: She jumped 6.70 m in qualification.)
2022	World Indoor Championships	(Serbia) Belgrade	10th	Long jump	6.57 m	
2022	World Championships	(United States) Eugene	14th	Long jump	6.60 m	
2022	European Championships	(Germany) Munich	5th	Long jump	6.62 m	(Note: She jumped 6.63 m in qualification.)
2023	European Indoor Championships	(Turkey) Istanbul	2nd	Long jump	6.97 m	NR
2023	European Team Championships	(Poland) Chorzów	3rd	Long jump	6.66 m	
2023	European U23 Championships	(Finland) Espoo	1st	Long jump	6.93 m	
2023	World Championships	(Hungary) Budapest	5th	Long jump	6.82 m	
2024	World Indoor Championships	(United Kingdom) Glasgow	7th	Long jump	6.69 m	
2024	European Championships	(Italy) Rome	2nd	Long jump	6.94 m	SB
2024	Olympic Games	(France) Paris	4th	Long jump	6.87m	
2025	European Indoor Championships	(Netherlands) Apeldoorn	1st	Long jump	6.94 m	
2025	World Championships	(Japan) Tokyo	15th (q)	Long jump	6.56 m	
2026	World Indoor Championships	(Poland) Toruń	2nd	Long jump	6.87 m	
2026	European Championships	(United Kingdom) Birmingham	1st	Long jump	7.00 m	
2026	World Ultimate Championship	(Hungary) Budapest	1st	Long jump	6.90 m	

=== National titles ===
Iapichino has won six national Italian championships at individual senior level.

- Italian Athletics Championships
  - Long jump: 2020, 2021, 2022 (3)
- Italian Athletics Indoor Championships
  - Long jump: 2021, 2023, 2024 (3)

== See also ==
- Italian all-time lists - Long jump
