= Cristina Sandu =

Romanian athletics competitor

Cristina Sandu (born 4 March 1990) is a Romanian athlete who competes in the long jump and the triple jump. She won the silver medal at the 2009 European Junior Championships. In addition, she represented her country at two outdoor and two indoor European Championships.

== Competition record ==
Year	Competition	Venue	Position	Event	Notes
Representing Romania
2005	World Youth Championships	Marrakesh, Morocco	11th	Long jump	5.94 m
2006	World Junior Championships	Beijing, China	20th (q)	Long jump	5.88 m (wind: -0.1 m/s)
2007	World Youth Championships	Ostrava, Czech Republic	9th	Long jump	6.19 m
2007	European Youth Olympic Festival	Belgrade, Serbia	4th	Long jump	6.00 m
2007	European Youth Olympic Festival	Belgrade, Serbia	1st	Triple jump	12.98 m
2008	World Junior Championships	Bydgoszcz, Poland	9th	Long jump	5.99 m (wind: -1.0 m/s)
2008	World Junior Championships	Bydgoszcz, Poland	26th (q)	Triple jump	12.30 m (wind: -0.1 m/s)
2009	European Junior Championships	Novi Sad, Serbia	5th	Long jump	6.21 m
2009	European Junior Championships	Novi Sad, Serbia	2nd	Triple jump	13.61 m
2009	Jeux de la Francophonie	Beirut, Lebanon	3rd	Long jump	6.27 m (w)
2009	Jeux de la Francophonie	Beirut, Lebanon	–	Triple jump	NM
2011	European Indoor Championships	Paris, France	14th (q)	Long jump	6.44 m
2011	European U23 Championships	Ostrava, Czech Republic	–	Long jump	NM
2012	European Championships	Helsinki, Finland	20th (q)	Long jump	6.22 m
2013	Universiade	Kazan, Russia	10th	Long jump	6.20 m
2014	European Championships	Zurich, Switzerland	12th	Triple jump	13.58 m
2015	European Indoor Championships	Prague, Czech Republic	9th (q)	Triple jump	13.97 m

== Personal bests ==
Outdoor

- Long jump – 6.53 (0.0 m/s) (Pátra 2009)
- Triple jump – 13.99 (+0.4 m/s) (Cluj-Napoca 2014)

Indoor

- Long jump – 6.54 (Bucharest 2011)
- Triple jump – 13.97 (Prague 2015)
