= Florentina Iusco =

Romanian long jumper

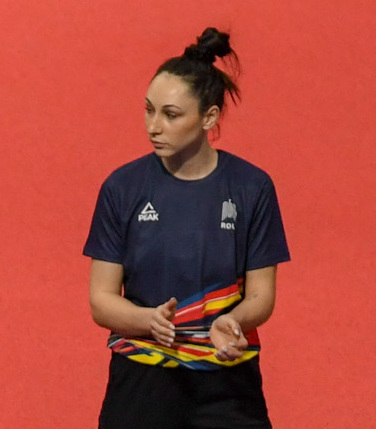

Personal information
- Nationality: Romanian
- Born: Florentina Costina Marincu; 8 April 1996 (age 30)

Sport
- Country: Romania
- Sport: Athletics
- Event: Long jump

Achievements and titles
- Personal bests: Long jump: 6.92m (Pitesti 2019); Triple jump: 13.94 (Bucharest 2023)
Medal record
European Indoor Championships
Bronze medal – third place	2015 Prague	Long jump

Florentina Costina Iusco (née Marincu; born 8 April 1996) is a Romanian track and field athlete who competes in the long jump.

== Career ==
Iusco grew up in Deva, Romania, a city famous for gymnastics. She was interested in sports and as her physique was not suited to gymnastics she focused on athletics instead. Her international debut came at the senior level when she was aged sixteen. At the 2013 European Athletics Indoor Championships she came 17th, failing to go beyond six metres. She came to prominence internationally with a gold medal double in the long jump and triple jump at the 2013 World Youth Championships in Athletics – becoming only the second athlete to achieve that feat, after her compatriot Cristine Spataru. She ended that year with personal bests of 6.54 m (21 ft 5 1/4 in) for the long jump and 13.81 m (45 ft 3 1/2 in) for the triple jump.

In her 2014 season, she set a series of personal bests, including 6.71 m (22 ft 0 in) for the long jump, 11.85 seconds for the 100 metres and 7.40 seconds for the 60 metres. Iusco won her first senior medal at the age of eighteen at the 2015 European Athletics Indoor Championships – after a jump of 6.57 m (21 ft 6 1/2 in) in the qualifying round, she had a personal best of 6.79 m (22 ft 3 1/4 in) in the final, which brought her the bronze medal behind Ivana Španović and Sosthene Taroum Moguenara.

Iusco is currently serving a two-year competition ban set to run from February 2024 to January 2026 in relation to an anti-doping rule violation after testing positive for furosemide in April 2023. Iusco's initial reprimand and no period of ineligibility issued by the Romania's National Anti-Doping Organisation was overturned by CAS following an appeal by WADA. All of her results backdated to April 2023 were disqualified.

== Personal bests ==
Outdoor

- 100 metres – 11.86 seconds (2014)
- Long jump – 6.92 m (22 ft 8 1/4 in) (2019)
- Triple jump – 13.81 m (45 ft 3 1/2 in) (2013)

Indoor

- 60 metres – 7.40 seconds (2014)
- Long jump – 6.79 m (22 ft 3 1/4 in) (2015)
- Triple jump – 13.34 m (43 ft 9 in) (2013)

== International competitions ==
Year	Competition	Venue	Position	Event	Notes
2013	European Indoor Championships	Gothenburg, Sweden	17th	Long jump	5.98 m
2013	World Youth Championships	Donetsk, Ukraine	1st	Long jump	6.42 m
2013	World Youth Championships	Donetsk, Ukraine	1st	Triple jump	13.75 m
2015	European Indoor Championships	Prague, Czech Republic	3rd	Long jump	6.79 m
2015	World Championships	Beijing, China	—	Long jump	NM
2019	Universiade	Naples, Italy	3rd	Long jump	6.55 m
2019	World Championships	Doha, Qatar	29th (q)	Long jump	6.22 m
2021	European Indoor Championships	Toruń, Poland	8th	Long jump	6.38 m
2021	European Indoor Championships	Toruń, Poland	12th (q)	Triple jump	13.65 m
2021	Olympic Games	Tokyo, Japan	20th (q)	Long jump	6.36 m
2022	World Indoor Championships	Belgrade, Serbia	14th	Long jump	6.24 m
2022	European Championships	Munich, Germany	–	Long jump	NM
2023	European Indoor Championships	Istanbul, Turkey	14th (q)	Long jump	6.37 m
2024	European Championships	Rome, Italy	DSQ	Long jump	~~6.58 m~~
2024	European Championships	Rome, Italy	DSQ	Triple jump	~~13.76 m~~
