= Nastassia Mironchyk-Ivanova =

Belarusian long jumper (born 1989)

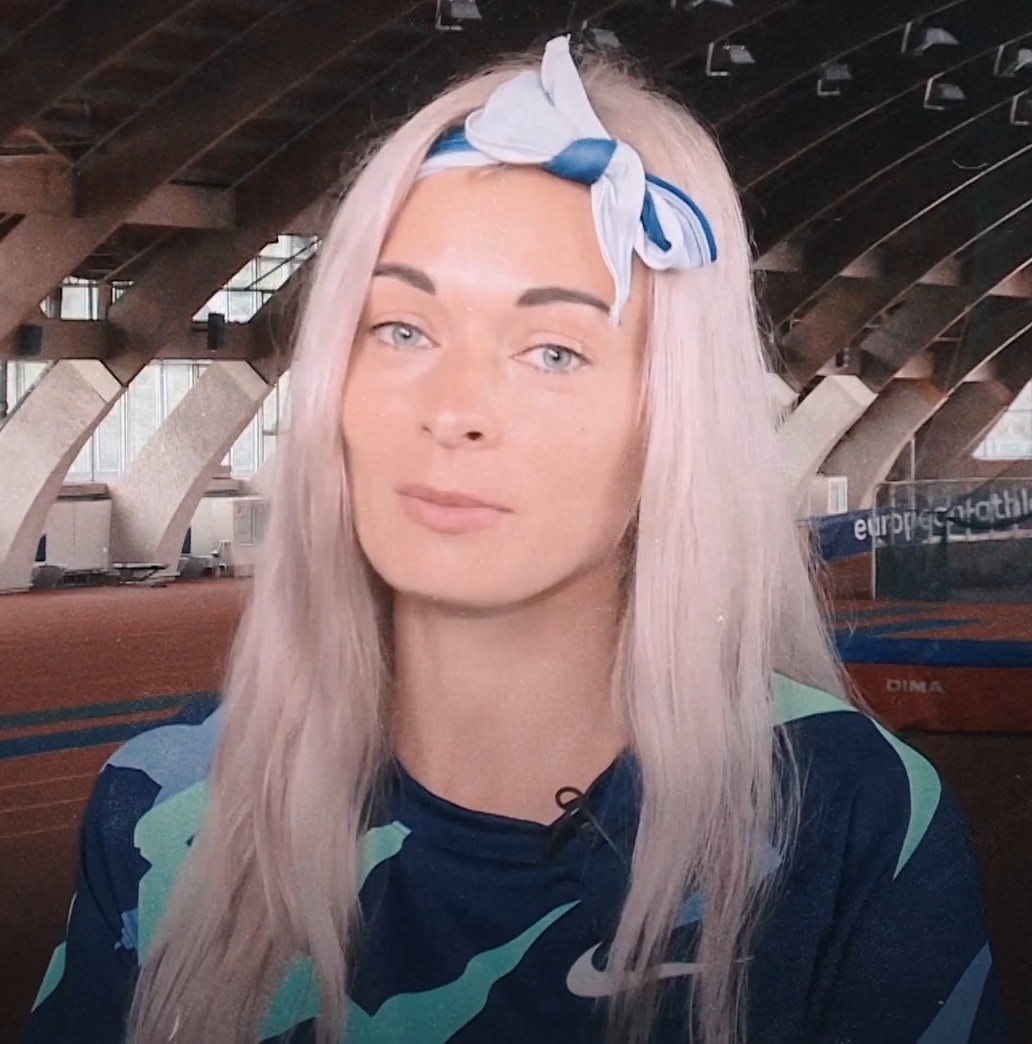
- Mironchyk-Ivanova in 2020

Personal information
- Born: 13 April 1989 (age 37) Slutsk
- Height: 1.71 m (5 ft 7 1/2 in)
- Weight: 53 kg (117 lb)

Sport
- Country: Belarus
- Sport: Athletics
- Event: Long jump
Medal record
World Championships
Bronze medal – third place	2011 Daegu	Long jump
European Indoor Championships
Silver medal – second place	2019 Glasgow	Long jump

Nastassia Siarheyeuna Mironchyk-Ivanova, née Mironchyk, (Belarusian: Настасся Сяргееўна Мірончык-Іванова, born 13 April 1989) is a Belarusian long jumper. In 2011, she became known for missing the World Championships gold medal because of her hair style. Her pony-tail left a mark in the sand well behind her body's 6.90 m mark.

On 25 November 2016 the IOC disqualified her from the 2012 Olympic Games and struck her results from the record for failing a drugs test in a re-analysis of her doping sample from 2012.

She was upgraded from fourth at the 2011 World Championships in Athletics to the bronze medal position as a result of a doping ban against Russian Olga Kucherenko, who had originally won the silver.

In 2019, she won the silver medal in the team event at the 2019 European Games held in Minsk, Belarus.

Following the 2024 election, Mironchyk-Ivanova became a deputy of the House of Representatives of Belarus.

== International competitions ==
Year	Competition	Venue	Position	Event	Notes
Representing Belarus
2008	World Junior Championships	Bydgoszcz, Poland	2nd	Long jump	6.46 m (-1.3 m/s)
2009	European U23 Championships	Kaunas, Lithuania	2nd	Long jump	6.76 m w (+4.7 m/s)
2009	World Championships	Berlin, Germany	11th	Long jump	6.29 m
2010	European Championships	Barcelona, Spain	6th	Long jump	6.75 m
2011	European Indoor Championships	Paris, France	6th	Long jump	6.55 m
2011	European U23 Championships	Ostrava, Czech Republic	6th	Long jump	6.54 m w (+2.5 m/s)
2011	World Championships	Daegu, South Korea	3rd	Long jump	6.74 m
2012	World Indoor Championships	Istanbul, Turkey	5th	Long jump	6.64 m
2015	World Championships	Beijing, China	9th	Long jump	6.66 m
2016	World Indoor Championships	Portland, United States	9th	Long jump	6.56 m
2018	European Championships	Berlin, Germany	5th	Long jump	6.58 m
2019	European Indoor Championships	Glasgow, United Kingdom	2nd	Long jump	6.93 m
2019	World Championships	Doha, Qatar	5th	Long jump	6.76 m
2021	European Indoor Championships	Toruń, Poland	4th	Long jump	6.72 m
2021	Olympic Games	Tokyo, Japan	14th (q)	Long jump	6.55 m
