= 2023 European Athletics Indoor Championships – Women's long jump =

Women's long jump at the 2023 European Athletics Indoor Championships
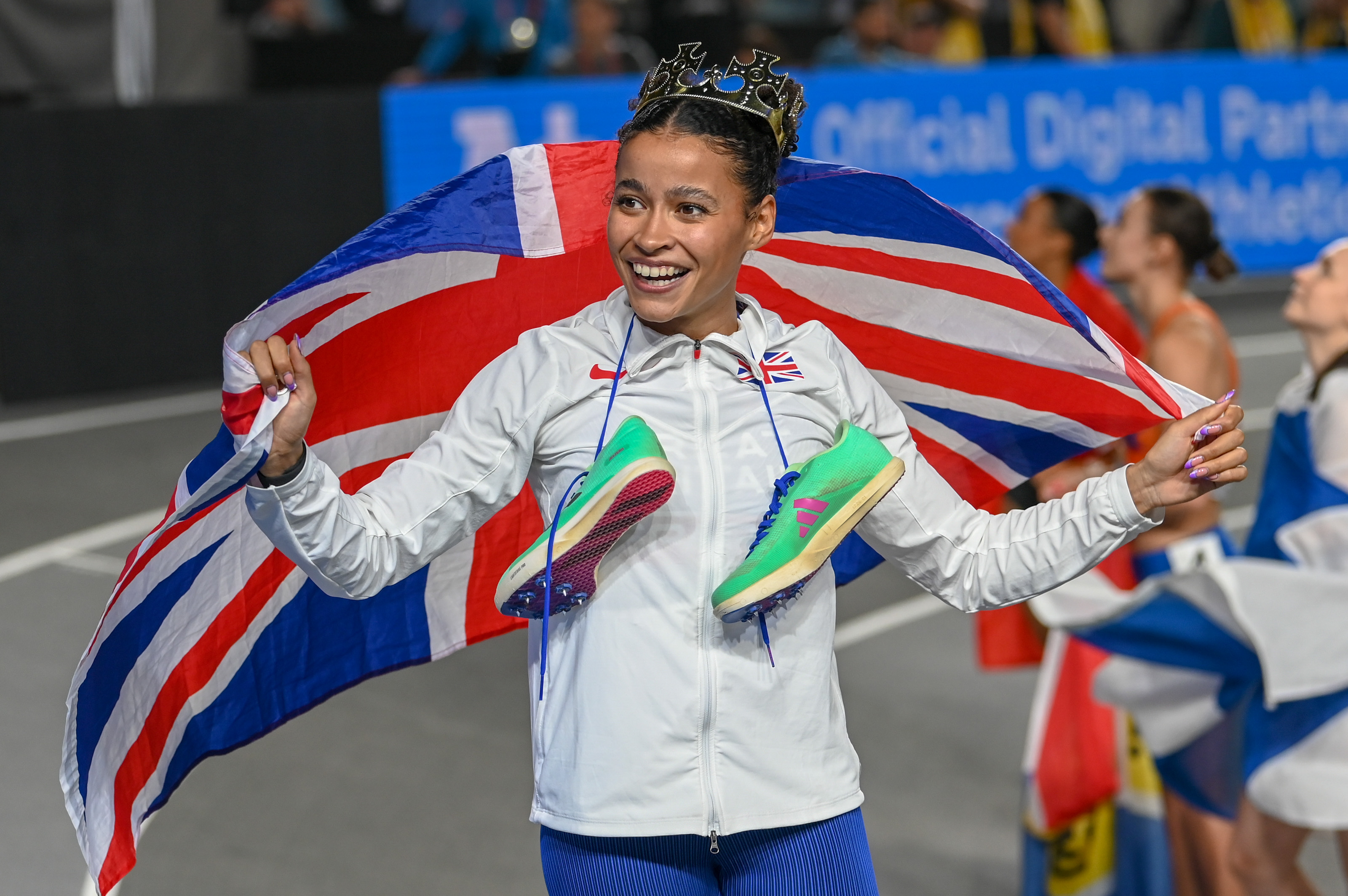
- Jazmin Sawyers shortly after the final.
- Venue: Ataköy Athletics Arena
- Location: Istanbul, Turkey
- Dates: 4 March 2023 (qualification); 5 March 2023 (final)
- Competitors: 18 from 14 nations
- Winning mark: 7.00 m WL, NR

Medalists
gold medal	Jazmin Sawyers	Great Britain
silver medal	Larissa Iapichino	Italy
bronze medal	Ivana Vuleta	Serbia

The women's long jump event at the 2023 European Athletics Indoor Championships was held on 4 March at 11:10 (qualification) and 5 March at 19:50 (final) local time.

== Records ==
Standing records prior to the 2023 European Athletics Indoor Championships
World record	Heike Drechsler (GDR)	7.37	Vienna, Austria	13 February 1988
European record	Heike Drechsler (GDR)	7.37	Vienna, Austria	13 February 1988
Championship record	Heike Drechsler (GDR)	7.30	Budapest, Hungary	5 March 1988
World Leading	Tara Davis (USA)	6.99	Albuquerque, United States	17 February 2023
European Leading	Milica Gardašević (SRB)	6.90	Belgrade, Serbia	18 February 2023

== Results ==
=== Qualification ===
Qualification: Qualifying performance 6.65 (Q) or at least 8 best performers (q) advance to the Final.

Rank	Athlete	Nationality	#1	#2	#3	Result	Note
1	Ivana Vuleta	Serbia	6.98			6.98	Q, EL
2	Malaika Mihambo	Germany	6.41	6.62	6.87	6.87	Q, SB
3	Khaddi Sagnia	Sweden	6.53	x	6.74	6.74	Q, SB
4	Jazmin Sawyers	Great Britain	6.71			6.71	Q
5	Annik Kälin	Switzerland	6.50	6.70		6.70	Q, SB
6	Larissa Iapichino	Italy	6.62	6.66		6.66	Q
7	Evelise Veiga	Portugal	6.32	6.40	6.53	6.53	q, SB
8	Alina Rotaru-Kottmann	Romania	6.43	6.29	6.52	6.52	q
9	Milica Gardašević	Serbia	6.37	6.51	6.46	6.51	
10	Fátima Diame	Spain	x	6.48	5.72	6.48	
11	Tiphaine Mauchant	France	6.37	6.43	6.43	6.43	
12	Diana Lesti	Hungary	x	6.40	6.38	6.40	SB
13	Mikaelle Assani	Germany	x	6.23	6.38	6.38	
14	Florentina Iusco	Romania	x	6.27	6.37	6.37	
15	Filippa Fotopoulou	Cyprus	6.36	6.28	6.11	6.36	
16	Jogailė Petrokaitė	Lithuania	6.00	6.22	6.26	6.26	
17	Plamena Mitkova	Bulgaria	6.24	6.25	x	6.25	
	Maryse Luzolo	Germany				DNS	

=== Final ===
Rank	Athlete	Nationality	#1	#2	#3	#4	#5	#6	Result	Note
1st place, gold medalist(s)	Jazmin Sawyers	Great Britain	6.70	x	x	6.76	7.00	6.84	7.00	WL NR
2nd place, silver medalist(s)	Larissa Iapichino	Italy	6.64	6.74	6.77	6.75	6.91	6.97	6.97	NR
3rd place, bronze medalist(s)	Ivana Vuleta	Serbia	6.76	6.79	6.66	6.77	6.91	6.90	6.91	
4	Malaika Mihambo	Germany	6.67	x	x	6.83	6.82	x	6.83	
5	Alina Rotaru-Kottmann	Romania	6.49	6.54	6.50	x	6.48	6.62	6.62	
6	Annik Kälin	Switzerland	6.61	6.35	6.43	6.60	6.54	6.50	6.61	
7	Khaddi Sagnia	Sweden	x	4.50	6.57	x	x	6.57	6.57	
8	Evelise Veiga	Portugal	x	5.24	6.36	6.11	6.07	6.19	6.36	
