= 2017 European Athletics Indoor Championships – Women's long jump =

The women's long jump event at the 2017 European Athletics Indoor Championships was held on 4 March 2015 at 12:00 (qualification) and 5 March, 17:40 (final) local time.

== Medalists ==
| Gold | Silver | Bronze |
|---|---|---|
| Ivana Španović; Serbia | Lorraine Ugen; Great Britain | Claudia Salman-Rath; Germany |

== Records ==
Standing records prior to the 2017 European Athletics Indoor Championships
| World record | Heike Drechsler (GDR) | 7.37 | Vienna, Austria | 13 February 1988 |
| European record | Heike Drechsler (GDR) | 7.37 | Vienna, Austria | 13 February 1988 |
| Championship record | Heike Drechsler (GDR) | 7.30 | Budapest, Hungary | 5 March 1988 |
| World Leading | Ivana Španović (SRB) | 6.96 | Belgrade, Serbia | 25 February 2017 |
| European Leading | Ivana Španović (SRB) | 6.96 | Belgrade, Serbia | 25 February 2017 |

== Results ==
=== Qualification ===
Qualification: Qualifying performance 6.60 (Q) or at least 8 best performers (q) advance to the Final.

| Rank | Athlete | Nationality | #1 | #2 | #3 | Result | Note |
|---|---|---|---|---|---|---|---|
| 1 | Ivana Španović | Serbia | 7.03 | | | 7.03 | Q, WL |
| 2 | Darya Klishina | Independent Athletes | x | 6.59 | 6.83 | 6.83 | Q, SB |
| 3 | Lorraine Ugen | Great Britain | 6.80 | | | 6.80 | Q, SB |
| 4 | Claudia Salman-Rath | Germany | 6.79 | | | 6.79 | Q, PB |
| 5 | Maryna Bekh | Ukraine | 6.55 | 6.71 | | 6.71 | Q, PB |
| 6 | Ksenija Balta | Estonia | 6.48 | 6.67 | | 6.67 | Q |
| 7 | Jazmin Sawyers | Great Britain | 6.29 | 6.47 | 6.54 | 6.54 | q |
| 8 | Alexandra Wester | Germany | x | 6.23 | 6.51 | 6.51 | q |
| 9 | Laura Strati | Italy | 6.49 | x | 6.20 | 6.49 | |
| 10 | Maryse Luzolo | Germany | 6.30 | 6.46 | 6.48 | 6.48 | |
| 11 | Juliet Itoya | Spain | 6.36 | 5.95 | x | 6.36 | |
| 12 | Jana Velďáková | Slovakia | 6.34 | x | x | 6.34 | SB |
| 13 | Anna Venhrus | Ukraine | 6.10 | x | x | 6.10 | |
| 14 | Veronika Shutkova | Belarus | x | 6.07 | x | 6.07 | |
| 15 | Fanni Schmelcz | Hungary | x | x | 6.05 | 6.05 | |
| 16 | Angela Moroșanu | Romania | x | 5.98 | 5.98 | 5.98 | |
| 17 | Martina Miroska | Macedonia | x | 5.42 | 5.58 | 5.58 | |

=== Final ===
| Rank | Athlete | Nationality | #1 | #2 | #3 | #4 | #5 | #6 | Result | Note |
|---|---|---|---|---|---|---|---|---|---|---|
| 1st place, gold medalist(s) | Ivana Španović | Serbia | x | 7.16 | 7.24 | 7.17 | x | 6.73 | 7.24 | WL, NR |
| 2nd place, silver medalist(s) | Lorraine Ugen | Great Britain | 6.75 | 6.97 | x | x | 6.58 | x | 6.97 | NR |
| 3rd place, bronze medalist(s) | Claudia Salman-Rath | Germany | 6.84 | 6.71 | 6.65 | 6.67 | 6.94 | 6.87 | 6.94 | PB |
| 4 | Darya Klishina | Independent Athletes | 6.62 | 6.79 | 6.52 | 6.80 | 6.68 | 6.84 | 6.84 | SB |
| 5 | Ksenija Balta | Estonia | x | x | 6.59 | x | 6.79 | x | 6.79 | SB |
| 6 | Jazmin Sawyers | Great Britain | 6.47 | x | 6.59 | x | x | 6.67 | 6.67 | |
| 7 | Maryna Bekh | Ukraine | x | x | 6.59 | 6.41 | 6.57 | 6.40 | 6.59 | |
| 8 | Alexandra Wester | Germany | x | 6.50 | x | 6.39 | 6.53 | 6.43 | 6.53 | |
