= 2022 World Athletics Indoor Championships – Women's long jump =

Women's long jump at the 2022 World Athletics Indoor Championships
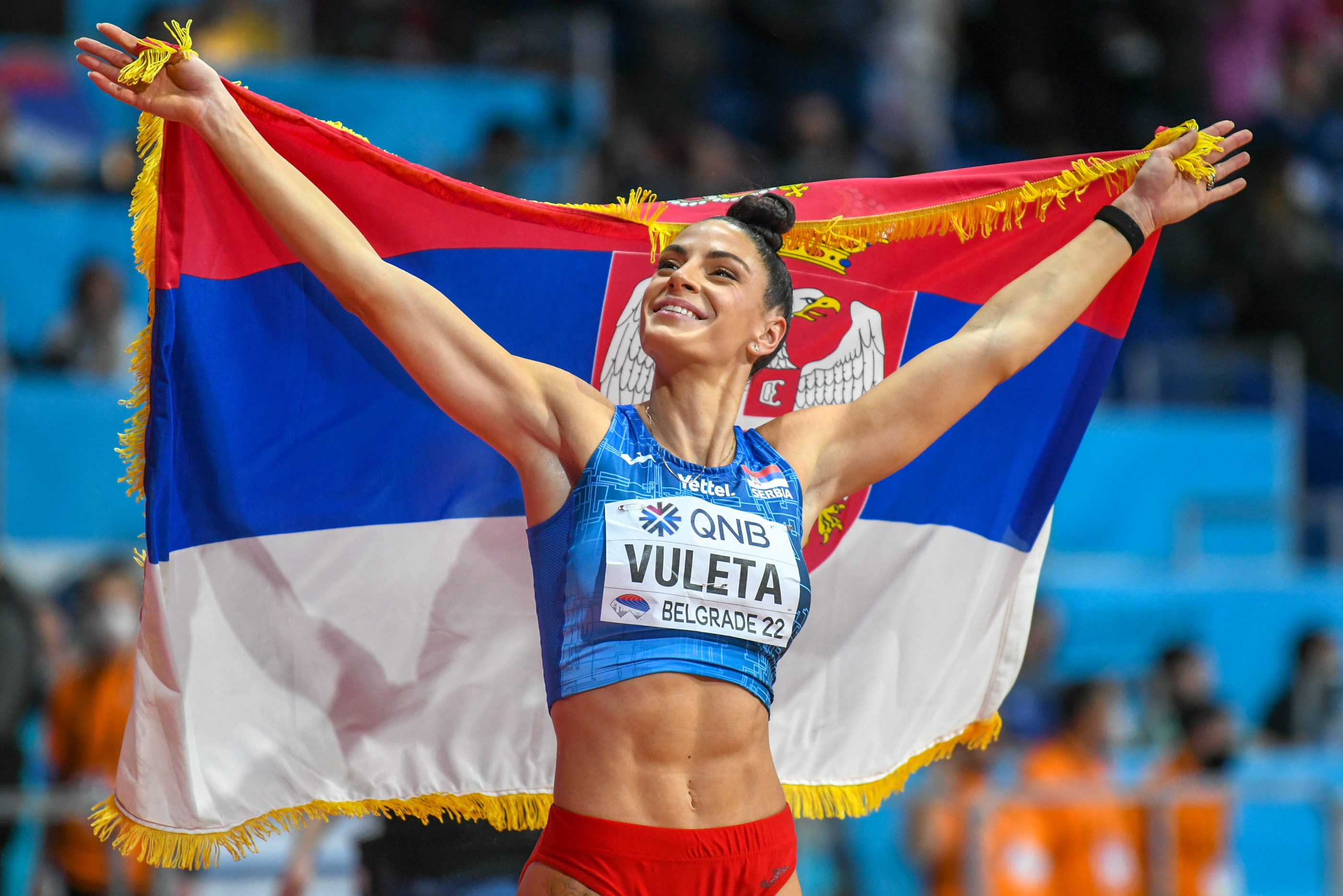
- Ivana Vuleta shortly after the final.
- Venue: Štark Arena
- Dates: 20 March
- Competitors: 15 from 12 nations
- Winning distance: 7.06

Medalists
gold medal	Ivana Vuleta	Serbia
silver medal	Ese Brume	Nigeria
bronze medal	Lorraine Ugen	Great Britain

The women's long jump at the 2022 World Athletics Indoor Championships took place on 20 March 2022.

== Results ==
The final was started at 17:37.

Rank	Athlete	Nationality	#1	#2	#3	#4	#5	#6	Result	Notes
1st place, gold medalist(s)	Ivana Vuleta	Serbia	x	6.89	x	7.06	x	x	7.06	WL
2nd place, silver medalist(s)	Ese Brume	Nigeria	6.22	6.47	6.85	6.66	6.76	6.67	6.85	SB
3rd place, bronze medalist(s)	Lorraine Ugen	Great Britain	x	x	6.82	x	6.78	x	6.82	SB
4	Tiffany Flynn	United States	6.70	6.78	6.43	6.65	6.51	x	6.78	SB
5	Quanesha Burks	United States	6.77	6.51	6.76	6.63	6.33	6.53	6.77	SB
6	Maryna Bekh-Romanchuk	Ukraine	x	x	6.68	6.73	x	x	6.73	SB
7	Fátima Diame	Spain	x	6.60	6.71	x	x	x	6.71	SB
8	Ruth Usoro	Nigeria	6.69	6.40	x	6.56	x	x	6.69	SB
9	Milica Gardašević	Serbia	x	x	6.59				6.59	
10	Larissa Iapichino	Italy	6.55	x	6.57				6.57	
11	Akela Jones	Barbados	x	6.55	6.55				6.55	
12	Khaddi Sagnia	Sweden	x	6.20	6.42				6.42	
13	Anasztázia Nguyen	Hungary	x	6.39	6.22				6.39	
14	Florentina Iusco	Romania	x	6.24	6.07				6.24	
	Eliane Martins	Brazil	x	x	x				NM	
