= Ivana Španović =

Serbian long jumper and triple jumper (born 1990)

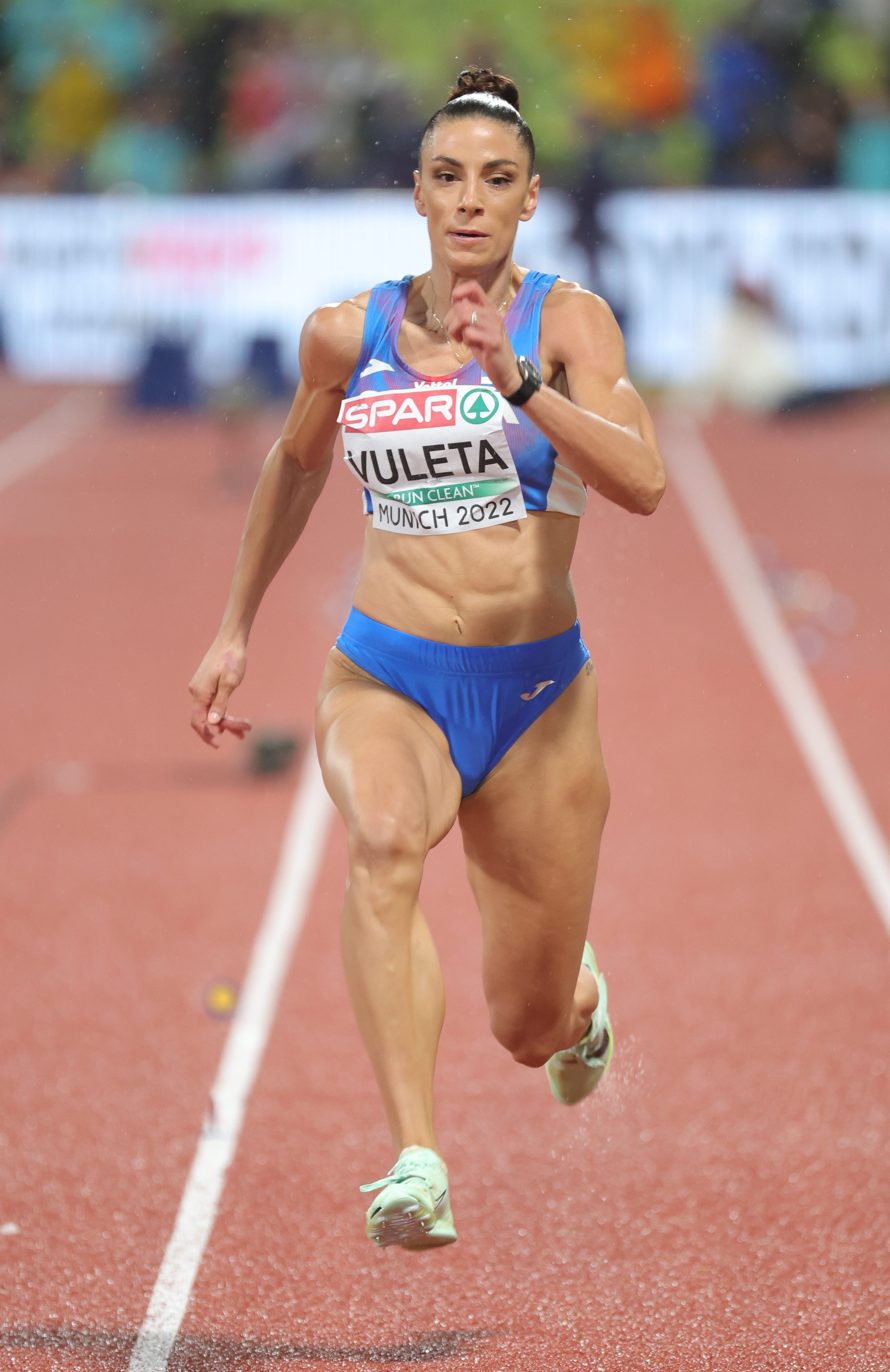
- Španović in 2022

Personal information
- Nationality: Serbian
- Born: Ivana Španović; 10 May 1990 (age 36) Zrenjanin, SR Serbia, SFR Yugoslavia
- Height: 1.76 m (5 ft 9 in)
- Weight: 65 kg (143 lb)

Sport
- Country: Serbia
- Sport: Track and field
- Events: Long jump Triple jump
- Club: AK Vojvodina
- Coached by: Goran Obradović

Achievements and titles
- Olympic finals: 2008 Beijing; Long jump, 30th (q); 2012 London; Long jump, 8th; 2016 Rio de Janeiro; Long jump, Bronze; 2020 Tokyo; Long jump, 4th
- World finals: 2013 Moscow; Long jump, Bronze; 2015 Beijing; Long jump, Bronze; 2017 London; Long jump, 4th; 2022 Eugene; Long jump, 7th; 2023 Budapest; Long jump, Gold
- Highest world ranking: 1st (2023)
- Personal bests: Long jump: 7.14 m (23 ft 5 in) NR (Budapest 2023); Indoors; Long jump: 7.24 m (23 ft 9 in)i NR (Belgrade 2017)
Medal record
Women's athletics
Representing Serbia
Event	1st	2nd	3rd
Olympic Games	0	0	1
World Championships	1	0	2
World Indoor Championships	2	1	1
European Championships	2	1	0
European Indoor Championships	3	0	1
Total	8	2	5
Olympic Games
Bronze medal – third place	2016 Rio de Janeiro	Long jump
World Championships
Gold medal – first place	2023 Budapest	Long jump
Bronze medal – third place	2013 Moscow	Long jump
Bronze medal – third place	2015 Beijing	Long jump
World Indoor Championships
Gold medal – first place	2018 Birmingham	Long jump
Gold medal – first place	2022 Belgrade	Long jump
Silver medal – second place	2016 Portland	Long jump
Bronze medal – third place	2014 Sopot	Long jump
European Championships
Gold medal – first place	2016 Amsterdam	Long jump
Gold medal – first place	2022 Munich	Long jump
Silver medal – second place	2014 Zurich	Long jump
European Indoor Championships
Gold medal – first place	2015 Prague	Long jump
Gold medal – first place	2017 Belgrade	Long jump
Gold medal – first place	2019 Glasgow	Long jump
Bronze medal – third place	2023 Istanbul	Long jump
Diamond League
First place	2016	Long jump
First place	2017	Long jump
First place	2021	Long jump
First place	2022	Long jump
First place	2023	Long jump
Continental Cup
Silver medal – second place	2014 Marrakesh	Long jump
Mediterranean Games
Gold medal – first place	2018 Tarragona	Long jump
Silver medal – second place	2026 Taranto	Triple jump
Universiade
Gold medal – first place	2009 Belgrade	Long jump
European Athletics U23 Championships
Silver medal – second place	2011 Ostrava	Long jump
World Junior Championships
Gold medal – first place	2008 Bydgoszcz	Long jump
European Junior Championships
Silver medal – second place	2009 Novi Sad	Long jump
World Youth Championships
Silver medal – second place	2007 Ostrava	Long jump
European Youth Olympic Festival
Silver medal – second place	2007 Belgrade	Long jump
Bronze medal – third place	2007 Belgrade	4x100 m relay

Ivana Španović (Serbian Cyrillic: Ивана Шпановић, [ǐʋana ʃpǎːnoʋit͡ɕ]; formerly Vuleta (from September 2021 to December 2023), Serbian Cyrillic: Вулета; born 10 May 1990) is a Serbian long jumper and triple jumper. She is the 2023 World champion, a two-time World indoor champion, a two-time European champion, a three-time European indoor champion and a five-time Diamond League Trophy Winner. Considering her achievements and longevity, Ivana Španović is regarded as one of the greatest female long jumpers of all time, with her indoor 7.24m jump ranked 3rd in all-time records.

In 2013, Španović became the first Serbian track and field athlete to win a medal at the World Championships in Athletics. In 2018, she became the first Serbian track and field athlete to win a senior gold medal at the World Indoor Championships in Athletics. In 2023, she became the first Serbian track and field athlete to win a senior gold medal at the World Outdoor Championship in Athletics. During her 15 years long career, she successfully claimed both outdoor and indoor European and World titles. She is the Serbian record holder in the long jump, indoors and outdoors, and also she is the national indoor record holder in the 60 metres and in the pentathlon. Her coach is Goran Obradović and she is a member of the Vojvodina Athletic Club, based in Novi Sad.

== Career ==
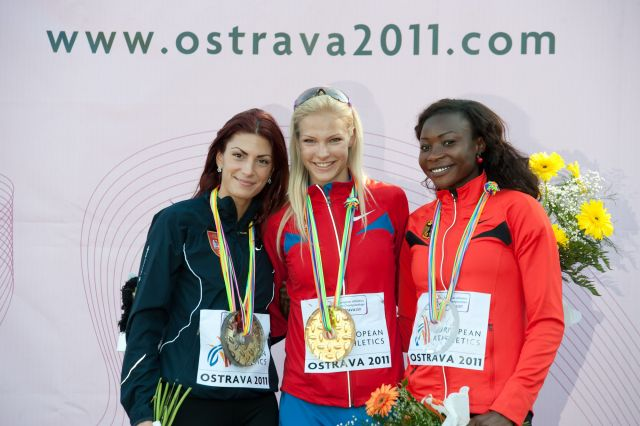
Španović (L) on the podium at the 2011 European U23 Championships

=== 2005–2012 ===
Španović earned gold medals at the 2008 World Junior Championships and the 2009 Summer Universiade. She was selected as Serbia's Best Young Athlete of 2008. She also won silver medals at the 2007 World Youth Championships, the 2009 European Junior Championships and the 2011 European U23 Championships.

Španović participated in the qualifying round at the 2008 Olympic Games, and was a finalist at the 2012 Olympic Games.

=== 2013 ===
In 2013, she started at the European Indoor Championship when she was ranked fifth. At the World outdoor championship she had achieved the best result in her career by then, bronze medal with the new national record 6.82 meters, getting the first medal for Serbia in an outdoor World Championships. The Olympic Committee of Serbia therefore declared her the best female athlete of the year.

=== 2014–2015 ===
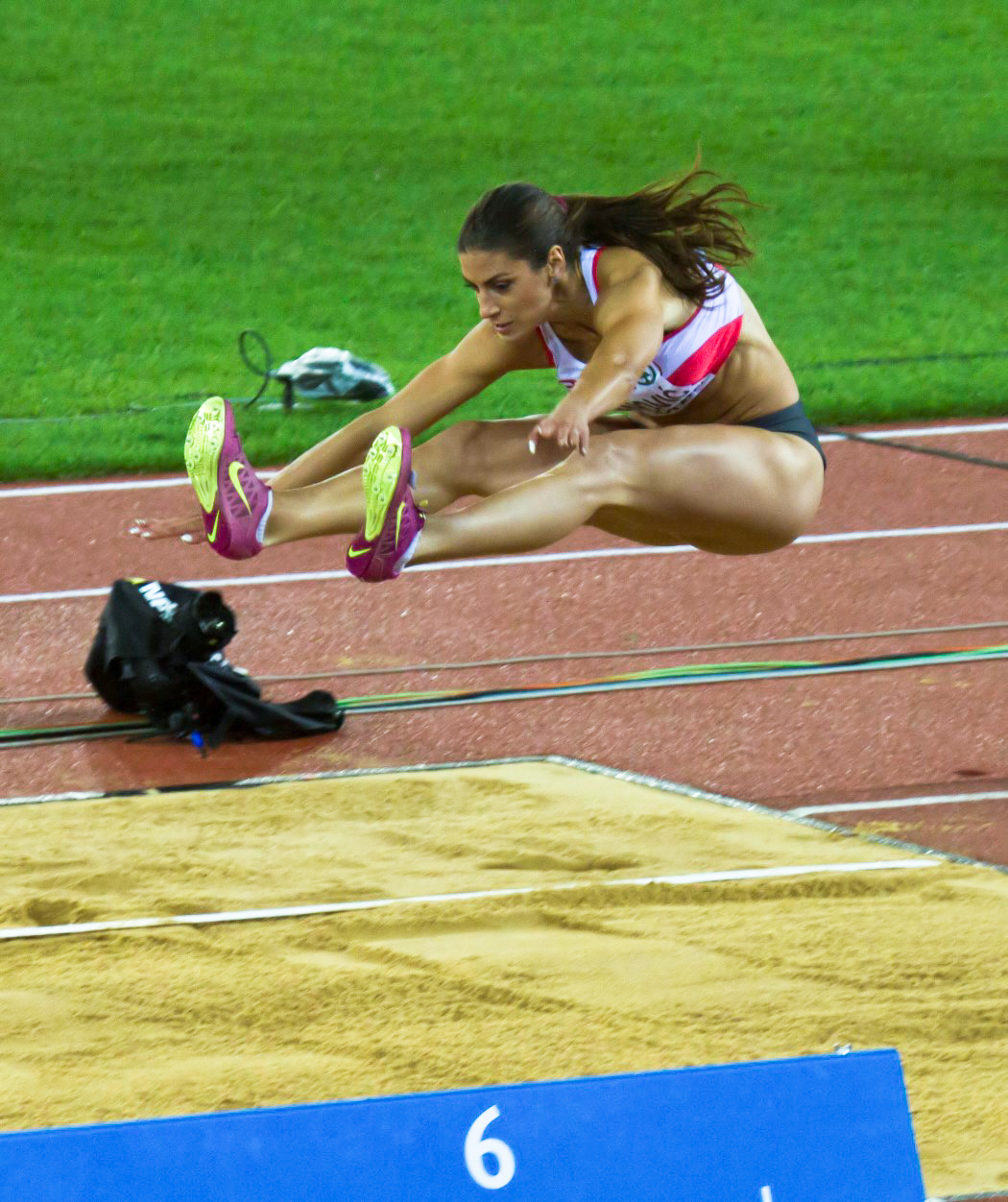
Španović at the 2014 European Championships in Zurich

In 2014, she won the bronze medal at the World Indoor Championships and silver medals at the European Outdoor championship and IAAF Continental Cup in Marrakesh. She also improved her outdoor personal best on 6.88 meters in the Diamond League meet in Eugene. Španović was second in long jump at 2014 Diamond League race.

In 2015, she won her first gold medal as a senior athlete becoming European indoor champion with new national record 6.98 meters. She won the second bronze medal at the World outdoor championship, improving her national record twice, both in qualification (6.91) and the final (7.01 got twice). Španović was second in long jump at 2015 Diamond League race. The Olympic Committee of Serbia therefore declared her the best female athlete of the year for the second time.

=== 2016 ===
During the indoor season, Španović won the silver medal at the World Indoor Championships improving her national record twice, 7.00 (at first round) and 7.07 (at fifth round). She was ahead for all the competition but she lost the gold medal because Reese had a fantastic 7.22 at the final round. During the outdoor, first Španović won the gold at the European Outdoor championship with 6.94, then she won the bronze medal at the Olympic Games with 7.08, new national record. Španović won for Serbia a medal in athletics at Olympic Games 60 years after the last medal. Španović clearly won 2016 Diamond League race in long jump. She won 5 of 7 meetings (a new record for Diamond League in long jump because before her none won more than 4 meetings in a year) and she was second in the other two ones. At the end of her long season, Španović improved her national record to 7.10 in a street meeting in front of her home fans in Belgrade on 11 September. This manifestation was held to promote 2017 European Indoor Championships in Belgrade.

=== 2017 ===
In 2017, she had an impressive win at European indoor championships in Belgrade. During the qualification she achieved the best ever indoor mark in a qualification round with 7.03. In the final she broke her national records twice, 7.16 (at second round) and 7.24 (at third round). So, she defended the gold medal she won in 2015. Her new national record, 7.24, put her as the third all-time indoor performers, and result is the second best ever jumped in the European Indoor Championships (after Drechsler's 7.30 in 1988) and the best performance in the latest 18 years, since Chistyakova achieved 7.30 on 28 January 1989. During the outdoor season, she had injuries so before the World outdoor championships she competed only in two Diamond League meetings. In the 2017 World outdoor championships, she led in the first part of the competition, but was 4th before her last attempt. With her final jump, Spanović seemed to clear the 7.02 mark of the leading, Brittney Reese, and tensely awaited the measurement but was awarded only 6.91. The Serbian team appealed with the slow motion showing that the indentation in the sand nearest to the board was made by the flapping bib number on her back. Eventually, the appeal was dismissed and she was ranked 4th with 6.96, behind Reese's 7.02, Klishina's 7.00 and Bartoletta's 6.97. After World Championships Spanović won 2017 Diamond League race in long jump for the second consecutive time.

=== 2018–2019 ===
In 2018, she achieved the first world title, winning the World Indoor Championships in Birmingham with 6.96. Reese was 2nd with 6.89 and Moguenara 3rd with 6.85. Španović is the first Serbian athlete to win a world senior title in athletics. After Španović won the gold medal at the Mediterranean Games in Tarragona with the Games record (7.04 windy and 6.99 regular), she got the best performance in the qualification at European Championships in Berlin. But an injury during the qualification forced her to give up the final and to defend her title. Her 6.84 got in qualification was better than the performance got by Mihambo (6.75) to win the gold medal, so it was the best result in the competition. The injury at Achille's tendon forced Španović to give up the final part of the season, included 2018 Diamond League race in which she qualified for the final.

In 2019, Španović, recovered by the injury of the previous summer, won gold medal at European indoor championships in Glasgow with 6.99. She matched the world indoor leading mark of 6.99 to emulate Heike Drechsler (1986–1988) as a three times in a row winner, but she got it in editions held every two years (2015–2017–2019). During the summer Španović had various injuries, including the one at ISTAF Berlin meeting, and was forced to forfeit the World Championships in Doha.

=== 2020–2021 ===
In 2020, Španović, bothered by a metatarsal bone fracture in June, decided to end her season already in August. She planned to compete at the European Indoor Championships next year, but not at the World Indoor Championships two weeks later. During the year, she had only one competition 6.80/0.8 long jump on 6 June in Novi Sad.

In 2021, Španović injured her right leg in the last training before leaving to Toruń and was forced to skip European Indoor Championships in which she would be trying to win a record fourth successive title. Recovered by the injury, in the outdoor season, she had two successes in the 2021 Diamond League race at the Golden Gala in Florence and at the DN Galan in Stockholm and one second place at Bislett Games in Oslo, before competing in the 2020 Tokyo Olympics. At the Games, she got the best performance in the qualification (7.00), measure which would have allowed her to win the gold medal in the final. But she jumped only 6.91 in the final and finished fourth. After the disappointment of the Olympic Games, Španović had another success in the Diamond League event at the Athletissima in Lausanne. At least she had a success at the Weltklasse Zürich final, with a result of 6.96. So she won for the third time the long jump in the Diamond League, the most victories in this event.

=== 2022–present ===
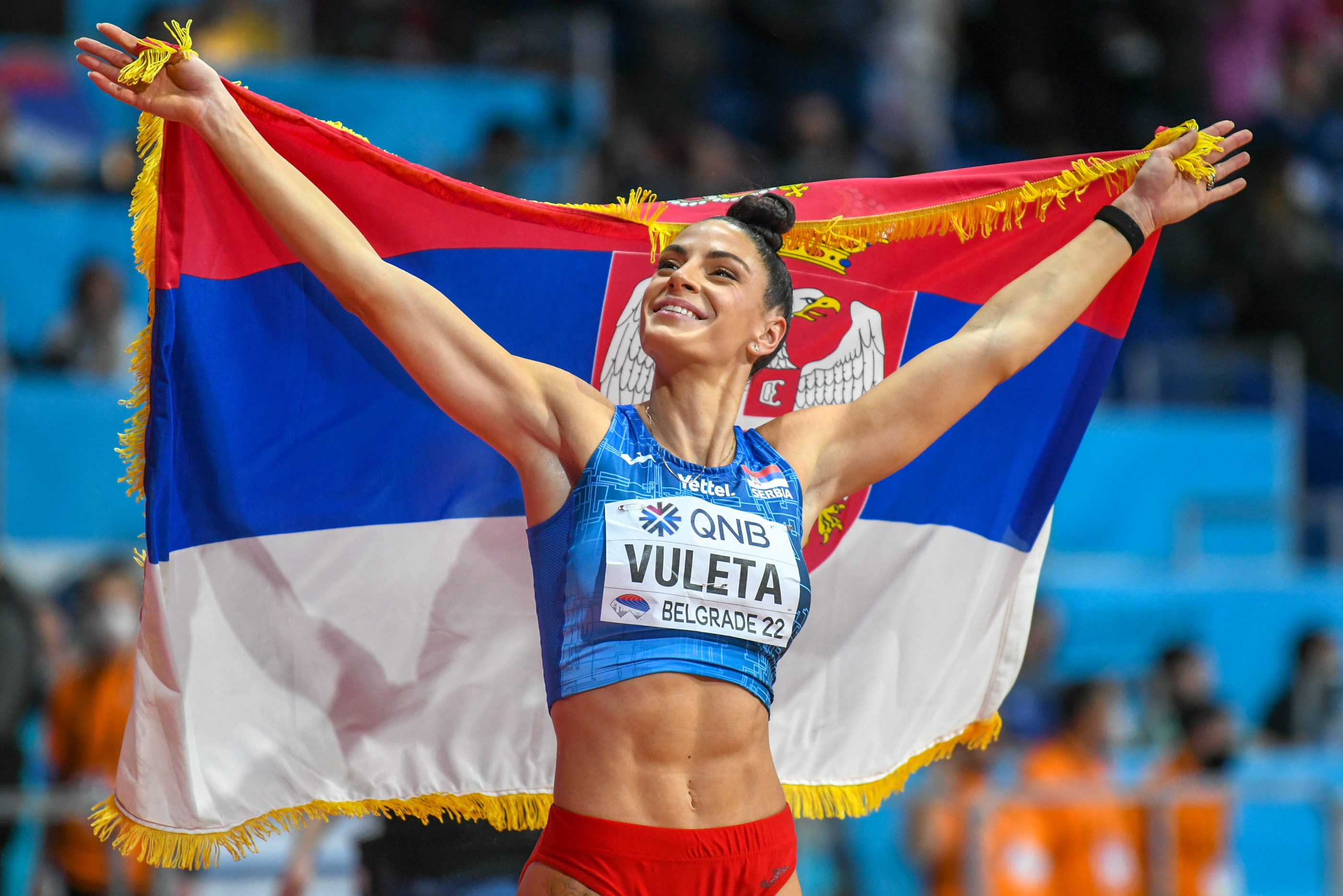
Vuleta at the 2022 World Indoor Championships in Belgrade

In 2022, Španović, then Vuleta, retained her title at the World Indoor Championships held in Belgrade. She triumphed with 7.06, the best performance of the 2022 indoor season. She gained the fourth consecutive medal in the event: bronze in 2014, silver in 2016, gold in 2018 and gold in 2022. After a disappointing 7th place at World outdoor championships in Eugene, but with a millimeter foul, enough for a medal, she had a brilliant final of the season. First she won the gold medal at European Championships in Munich with a 7.06 jump, the best one in European Championships from 1998. She achieved 7.06 at the first attempt and it was the first jump over 7.00 at European Championships in the 21st century. After her seventh gold medal at a major championships, Španović-Vuleta won the final of 2022 Diamond League race in Zurich, with a result of 6.97, once again got on her first jump. So she won for the fourth time the long jump in the Diamond League, the most victories in this event. The Olympic Committee of Serbia therefore declared her Sportswoman of The Year for the third time. Her 2023 season was one to remember. In March, Vuleta took part in the European Indoor Championship in Athletics where she finished 3rd with 6.91. In August, Vuleta completed her long lasting dream of becoming the outdoor World Champion by winning gold medal at the World Outdoor Championship in Athletics with a 7.14 mark. She got the first gold medal for Serbia in an outdoor World Championships. In September, Vuleta announced her retirement from the athletics following the upcoming 2024 Summer Olympic Games in Paris. After her eighth gold medal at a major championships, Španović-Vuleta won the final of 2023 Diamond League race in Eugene, with a result of 6.85. So she won for the fifth time the long jump in the Diamond League, the most victories in this event. Previously she won another Diamong League meeting in Xiamen. The Olympic Committee of Serbia therefore declared her the best Sportswoman of The Year for the fourth time.

In 2024, an achilles tendon injury meant she only competed twice before the Olympics where she failed to qualify for the final - achieving 6.51 m just short of the automatic qualification distance of 6.59 m.

As of 2025, she is now specialising in the triple jump. In 2026, she finished 6th at the World Indoor Championships, 8th at the European Championships, and won silver at the Mediterranean Games.

Španović has achieved nineteen victories in the IAAF Diamond League circuit, a record in women long jump. Also, she has achieved two victories in the IAAF World Challenge circuit, at the ISTAF Berlin in 2015 and at the Hanžeković Memorial with 6.96, a new meeting record, in 2016. Since the 2013 World Championship, Španović has won overall 15 medals in all major events.

She set 32 national senior records: 13 outdoors (all in long jump), 19 indoors (16 in long jump, one in 60m, one in triple jump and one in pentathlon).

== Achievements ==
=== Personal bests ===
Outdoor
Event	Performance	Date	Location	Notes
100 m	11.90	18 May 2013	Sremska Mitrovica, Serbia	
Long jump	7.14 m (23 ft 5 in)	20 August 2023	Budapest, Hungary	NR
Triple jump	14.43 m (47 ft 4 in)	2 August 2025	Kraljevo, Serbia	

Indoor
Event	Performance	Date	Location	Notes
60 m	7.31	31 January 2015	Novi Sad, Serbia	NR
Long jump	7.24 m (23 ft 9 in)	5 March 2017	Belgrade, Serbia	NR
Triple jump	14.41 m (47 ft 3 1/4 in)	28 January 2026	Belgrade, Serbia	NR
Pentathlon	4240 pts	19 January 2013	Novi Sad, Serbia	NR

=== International competitions ===
Year	Competition	Venue	Position	Event	Result
Representing Serbia and Montenegro
2005	World Youth Championships	Marrakesh, Morocco	16th (q)	Long jump	5.97 m
Representing Serbia
2006	World Junior Championships	Beijing, China	7th	Long jump	6.23 m (wind: 0.0 m/s)
2007
2007	European Indoor Championships	Birmingham, United Kingdom	18th (q)	Long jump	6.18 m
2007	World Youth Championships	Ostrava, Czech Republic	2nd	Long jump	6.41 m (wind: +0.5 m/s)
2007	European Junior Championships	Hengelo, Netherlands	5	Long jump	6.22 m (wind: −0.2 m/s)
2007	European Youth Olympic Festival	Belgrade, Serbia	2nd	Long jump	6.20 m (wind: −0.1 m/s)
2007	European Youth Olympic Festival	Belgrade, Serbia	3rd	4 × 100 m relay	46.85 s
2008
2008	World Junior Championships	Bydgoszcz, Poland	1st	Long jump	6.61 m (wind: +1.3 m/s)
2008	Olympic Games	Beijing, China	30th (q)	Long jump	6.30 m (wind: +1.8 m/s)
2009
2009	Universiade	Belgrade, Serbia	1st	Long jump	6.64 m (wind: 0.0 m/s)
2009	European Junior Championships	Novi Sad, Serbia	2nd	Long jump	6.71 m (wind: −0.1 m/s) NJR NR
2010
2010	European Championships	Barcelona, Spain	8th	Long jump	6.60 m (wind: −0.3 m/s)
2011	European U23 Championships	Ostrava, Czech Republic	2nd	Long jump	6.74 m w (wind: +3.2 m/s)
2012	European Championships	Helsinki, Finland	15th (q)	Long jump	6.33 m (wind: +0.1 m/s)
2012	Olympic Games	London, United Kingdom	10th	Long jump	6.35 m (wind: +0.9 m/s)
2013	European Indoor Championships	Gothenburg, Sweden	5th	Long jump	6.68 m
2013	World Championships	Moscow, Russia	3rd	Long jump	6.82 m NR (wind: +0.1 m/s)
2014	World Indoor Championships	Sopot, Poland	3rd	Long jump	6.77 m
2014	European Championships	Zurich, Switzerland	2nd	Long jump	6.81 m (wind: −1.6 m/s)
2014	Continental Cup	Marrakesh, Morocco	2nd	Long jump	6.56 m (wind: −0.1 m/s)
2015	European Indoor Championships	Prague, Czech Republic	1st	Long jump	6.98 m NR
2015	World Championships	Beijing, China	3rd	Long jump	7.01 m NR (wind: +0.6 m/s)
2016	World Indoor Championships	Portland, United States	2nd	Long jump	7.07 m NR
2016	European Championships	Amsterdam, Netherlands	1st	Long jump	6.94 m (wind: +0.9 m/s)
2016	Olympic Games	Rio de Janeiro, Brazil	3rd	Long jump	7.08 m NR (wind: +0.6 m/s)
2017	European Indoor Championships	Belgrade, Serbia	1st	Long jump	7.24 m NR
2017	World Championships	London, United Kingdom	4th	Long jump	6.96 m (wind: +0.1 m/s)
2018	World Indoor Championships	Birmingham, United Kingdom	1st	Long jump	6.96 m
2018	Mediterranean Games	Tarragona, Spain	1st	Long jump	7.04 m (wind: +2.2 m/s) w 6.99 m (wind: +1.8 m/s) GR
2018	European Championships	Berlin, Germany	1st (q)	Long jump	6.84 m^{1}
2019	European Indoor Championships	Glasgow, United Kingdom	1st	Long jump	6.99 m
2021	Olympic Games	Tokyo, Japan	4th	Long jump	6.91 m (wind: −0.4 m/s)
2022	World Indoor Championships	Belgrade, Serbia	1st	Long jump	7.06 m
2022	World Championships	Eugene, OR, United States	7th	Long jump	6.84 m (wind: +0.6 m/s)
2022	European Championships	München, Germany	1st	Long jump	7.06 m (wind: +0.3 m/s)
2023	European Indoor Championships	Istanbul, Turkey	3rd	Long jump	6.91 m
2023	World Championships	Budapest, Hungary	1st	Long jump	7.14 m
2024	Olympic Games	Paris, France	16th (q)	Long jump	6.51 m
2025	World Championships	Tokyo, Japan	16th (q)	Triple jump	13.82 m
2026	World Indoor Championships	Toruń, Poland	6th	Triple jump	14.35 m
2026	European Championships	Birmingham, United Kingdom	8th	Triple jump	14.06 m
2026	Mediterranean Games	Taranto, Italy	2nd	Triple jump	14.09 m

^{1}Did not start in the final

=== Circuit wins and titles ===
- Diamond League Overall long jump Diamond Race title: 2016
- Diamond League long jump champion: 2017, 2021, 2022, 2023
  - 2013 (1): Stockholm
  - 2014 (2): Eugene (=WL NR), Zürich
  - 2015 (2): Monaco, Zürich (NR)
  - 2016 (5): Shanghai (MR), Oslo, Stockholm, Lausanne, Paris
  - 2017 (2): Lausanne, Brussels
  - 2021 (4): Florence, Stockholm, Lausanne, Zürich
  - 2022 (1): Zürich
  - 2023 (2): Xiamen, Eugene

=== National titles ===
- Serbian Athletics Championships
  - Long jump: 2006, 2008, 2011, 2012, 2013, 2019, 2025
  - Triple jump: 2025, 2026
- Serbian Indoor Athletics Championships
  - 60 metres: 2015
  - Long jump: 2013, 2015, 2021, 2022
  - Triple jump: 2026
  - Pentathlon: 2013

=== Balkan titles ===
- Balkan Athletics Championships
  - Long jump: 2011, 2013, 2022
  - Triple jump: 2022, 2025
- Balkan Indoor Athletics Championships
  - Long jump: 2008, 2013, 2014, 2016, 2017, 2021
  - Triple jump: 2026

== Honours ==
- Order of Karađorđe's Star
- Order of Njegoš

== Personal life ==
Španović married fitness nutritionist Marko Vuleta in September 2021. She officially adopted her husband's last name upon marriage. They filed for divorce in December 2023.

Sporting positions
Preceded by (United States) Brittney Reese	Women's long jump Best year performance 2017	Succeeded by (United Kingdom) Lorraine Ugen
