= Abigail Irozuru =

British long jumper

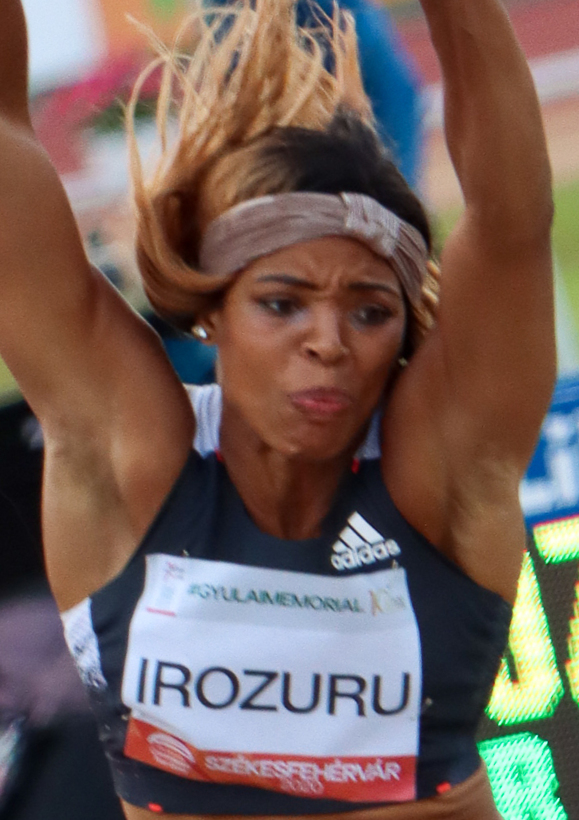
- Irozuru at the 2020 Gyulai Memorial

Medal record

Representing Great Britain

Women's athletics

Commonwealth Youth Games
Gold medal – first place	2008 Pune	Long jump

Abigail Irozuru (born 3 January 1990, in Manchester) is an English track and field athlete, specialising in long jump. She was sponsored by Virgin Trains West Coast and had a Class 390 Pendolino train named after her in September 2011.

She competed for the Sale Harriers, the same club as former Great Britain athletes Diane Modahl and Darren Campbell.

== Early life ==
Irozuru was born in Manchester. Both of her parents are from the Igbo people of Nigeria.

== Career ==
Irozuru began participating in athletics as a 14-year-old after she excelled at a youth athletics match by winning the 100 m, 200 m, 4 × 100 m and the long jump. This led to an invitation by Ian Wiltshire to start training at the City of Manchester Stadium before its conversion to a full football stadium. Her talent quickly shone through and in 2006 Irozuru won Silver at both the English Schools Championships and British Schools Championships competing against highly accomplished young jumpers.

After establishing herself as an elite junior athlete, Irozuru moved to London to study for a law degree at University College London where she firstly worked with UK Athletics head long and triple jumps coach John Herbert who also coached Jade Johnson to the 2008 Summer Olympics. Her current coach is Larry Achike who helped her achieve 2012 National Indoor Long Jump Silver and Gold in her first senior international in Bratislava. On Saturday 9 June 2012 at the Georgi Pavlov International Athletics Meeting in Sofia, Bulgaria Irozuru jumped 6.80m in the sixth round, setting a new personal best and meeting the Olympic A Qualifying distance for the 2012 Summer Olympics. On the 24 June 2012 at the Aviva Olympic Trials & UK Championships in Birmingham she was disappointed to jump 6.48 which meant she had to compete at the 2012 European Athletics Championships in Helsinki, Finland.

After retiring in 2016, she made a comeback in 2019, improving her personal best to 6.86 m, and reaching the final (placing seventh) at the World Championships in Doha.

== Personal life ==
Irozuru is a Christian. When asked in an interview with Christian magazine Woman Alive how she would choose to label herself, she remarked 'I always try to start with being a daughter of the Almighty God - my dad calls me that. And an athlete for sure, and a speaker. I'm a coach and a daughter, a sister... so much'.
