= 2025 Bauhausgalan =

Athletics meeting in Stockholm, Sweden

- Dates: 14-15 June 2025
- Host city: Stockholm, Sweden
- Venue: Stockholm Olympic Stadium
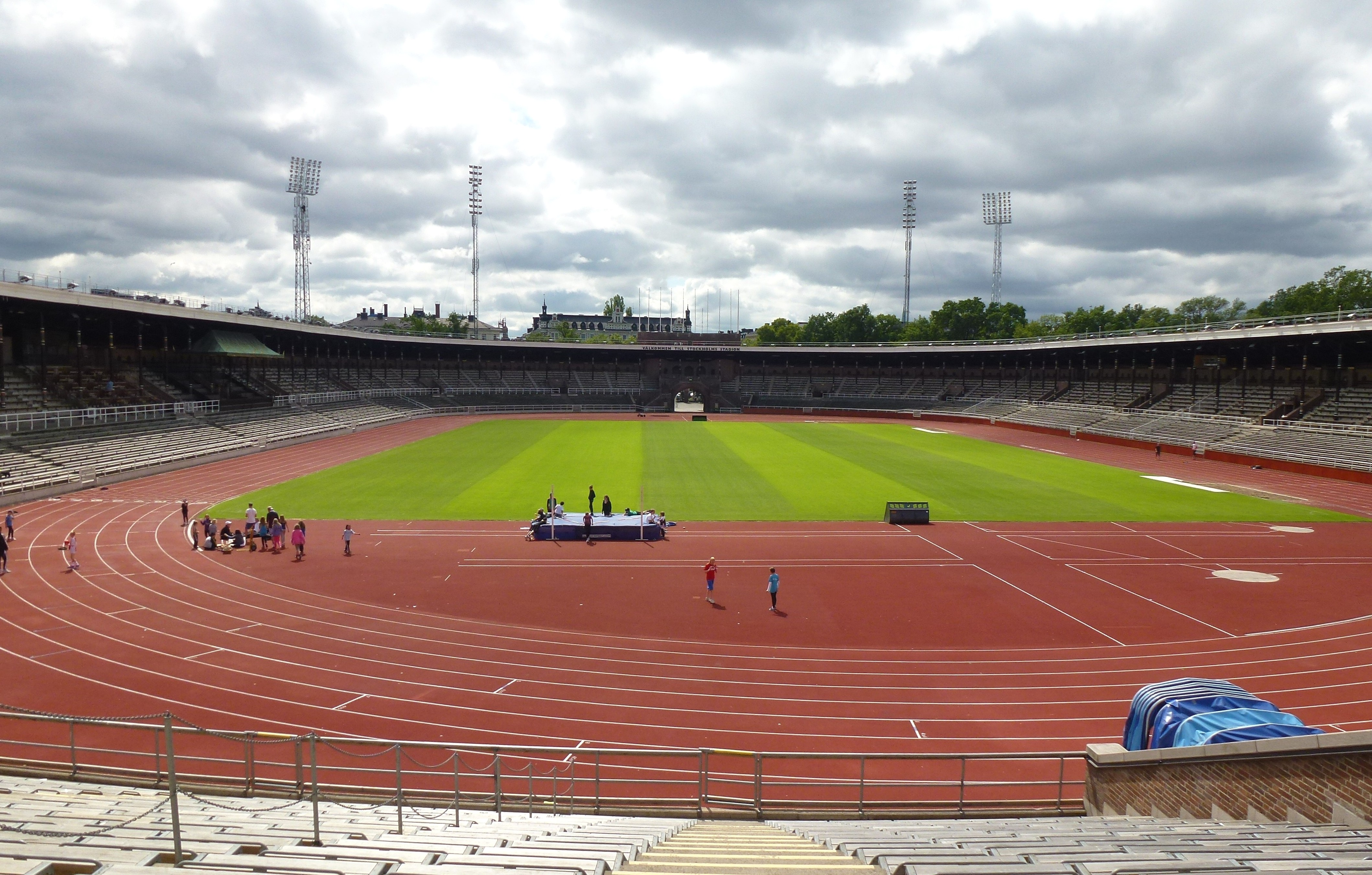
- Level: 2025 Diamond League

The 2025 Bauhausgalan was the 59th edition of the annual outdoor track and field meeting in Stockholm, Sweden. Held on 14 and 15 June 2025 at Stockholm Olympic Stadium, it was the seventh leg of the 2025 Diamond League – the highest level international track and field circuit.

== Diamond+ event results ==
Starting in 2025 a new discipline of events was added called Diamond+, these 4 events per meet awarded athletes with increased prize money whilst keeping the standard points format to qualify for the Diamond league finals. First place earns 8 points, with each step down in place earning one less point than the previous, until no points are awarded in 9th place or lower. In the case of a tie, each tying athlete earns the full amount of points for the place.

=== Men's ===
400 metres hurdles
Place	Athlete	Nation	Time	Points	Notes
1st place, gold medalist(s)	Rai Benjamin	United States	46.54	8	MR, WL
2nd place, silver medalist(s)	Alison dos Santos	Brazil	46.68	7	SB
3rd place, bronze medalist(s)	Karsten Warholm	Norway	47.41	6	
4	Emil Agyekum	Germany	48.37	5	
5	Alastair Chalmers	Great Britain	48.63	4	
6	Carl Bengtström	Sweden	48.80	3	
7	Karl Wållgren	Sweden	51.26	2	
—	Matheus Lima	Brazil	DNF		SB

Pole vault
Place	Athlete	Nation	Height	Points	Notes
1st place, gold medalist(s)	Armand Duplantis	Sweden	6.28 m	8	WR, DLR
2nd place, silver medalist(s)	Kurtis Marschall	Australia	5.90 m	7	
3rd place, bronze medalist(s)	Menno Vloon	Netherlands	5.80 m	6	
4	Renaud Lavillenie	France	5.80 m	5	
5	Daniel Keaton	United States	5.70 m	4	
5	Ersu Şaşma	Turkey	5.70 m	4	
7	EJ Obiena	Philippines	5.70 m	2	
8	Emmanouil Karalis	Greece	5.60 m	1	
8	Sam Kendricks	United States	5.60 m	1	

=== Women's ===
100 metres
Place	Athlete	Nation	Time	Points	Notes
1st place, gold medalist(s)	Julien Alfred	Saint Lucia	10.75	8	MR, SB
2nd place, silver medalist(s)	Dina Asher-Smith	Great Britain	10.93	7	SB
3rd place, bronze medalist(s)	Marie Josée Ta Lou-Smith	Ivory Coast	11.00	6	=SB
4	Maia McCoy	Liberia	11.12	5	
5	Daryll Neita	Great Britain	11.17	4	SB
6	Patrizia Van der Weken	Luxembourg	11.18	3	
7	Julia Henriksson	Sweden	11.24	2	SB
8	Zaynab Dosso	Italy	11.26	1	=SB
			Wind: (+0.9 m/s)		

3000 metres
Place	Athlete	Nation	Time	Points	Notes
1st place, gold medalist(s)	Linden Hall	Australia	8:30.01	8	PB
2nd place, silver medalist(s)	Sarah Chelangat	Uganda	8:31.27	7	NR
3rd place, bronze medalist(s)	Innes FitzGerald	Great Britain	8:32.90	6	PB
4	Hannah Nuttall	Great Britain	8:33.82	5	PB
5	Caroline Nyaga	Kenya	8:34.79	4	SB
6	Hellen Ekalale Lobun	Kenya	8:36.85	3	PB
7	Águeda Marqués	Spain	8:37.24	2	PB
8	Marta García	Spain	8:38.83	1	SB
9	Salomé Afonso	Portugal	8:39.31		
10	Marta Zenoni	Italy	8:41.72		PB
11	Nozomi Tanaka	Japan	8:50.18		
—	Sarah Lahti	Sweden	DNF		
—	Katie Snowden	Great Britain	DNF		
—	Nikola Bisová	Czech Republic	DNF		PM
—	Winnie Nanyondo	Uganda	DNF		PM

== Diamond event results ==
=== Men's ===
200 metres
Place	Athlete	Nation	Time	Points	Notes
1st place, gold medalist(s)	Reynier Mena	Cuba	20.05	8	SB
2nd place, silver medalist(s)	Joseph Fahnbulleh	Liberia	20.32	7	
3rd place, bronze medalist(s)	Kyree King	United States	20.49	6	
4	Henrik Larsson	Sweden	20.51	5	SB
5	Abduraqhman Karriem	South Africa	20.52	4	
6	Erik Erlandsson	Sweden	20.57	3	
7	Joshua Hartmann	Germany	20.97	2	
—	Aaron Brown	Canada	DQ		TR 16.8
			Wind: (+2.0 m/s)		

800 metres
Place	Athlete	Nation	Time	Points	Notes
1st place, gold medalist(s)	Emmanuel Wanyonyi	Kenya	1:41.95	8	WL
2nd place, silver medalist(s)	Djamel Sedjati	Algeria	1:42.27	7	SB
3rd place, bronze medalist(s)	Josh Hoey	United States	1:42.43	6	PB
4	Gabriel Tual	France	1:42.72	5	SB
5	Slimane Moula	Algeria	1:42.77	4	PB
6	Tshepiso Masalela	Botswana	1:43.61	3	
7	Wyclife Kinyamal	Kenya	1:43.95	2	
8	Andreas Kramer	Sweden	1:44.08	1	
9	Bryce Hoppel	United States	1:47.59		
—	Patryk Sieradzki	Poland	DNF		PM

5000 metres
Place	Athlete	Nation	Time	Points	Notes
1st place, gold medalist(s)	Andreas Almgren	Sweden	12:44.27	8	AR, MR
2nd place, silver medalist(s)	Kuma Girma	Ethiopia	12:57.46	7	
3rd place, bronze medalist(s)	Ky Robinson	Australia	12:58.38	6	PB
4	Mike Foppen	Netherlands	13:02.43	5	NR
5	Keneth Kiprop	Uganda	13:02.69	4	
6	Denis Kipkoech	Kenya	13:07.02	3	
7	Cole Hocker	United States	13:09.36	2	
8	Morgan Beadlescomb	United States	13:13.37	1	
9	Eduardo Herrera	Mexico	13:17.08		
10	Saymon Tesfagiorgis	Eritrea	13:23.78		
11	Andrew Alamisi	Kenya	13:29.07		
12	Emil Danielsson	Sweden	13:32.03		
13	Biniyam Melak	Ethiopia	13:32.79		
14	Cornelius Kemboi	Kenya	13:49.29		
—	Adam Czerwiński	Poland	DNF		PM
—	Ybeltal Gashahun	Ethiopia	DNF		PM
—	Filip Sasínek	Czech Republic	DNF		PM

Discus throw
Place	Athlete	Nation	Distance	Points	Notes
1st place, gold medalist(s)	Kristjan Čeh	Slovenia	69.73 m	8	
2nd place, silver medalist(s)	Daniel Ståhl	Sweden	69.53 m	7	SB
3rd place, bronze medalist(s)	Matthew Denny	Australia	68.14 m	6	
4	Clemens Prüfer	Germany	66.26 m	5	
5	Henrik Janssen	Germany	65.04 m	4	
6	Rojé Stona	Jamaica	64.68 m	3	
7	Lawrence Okoye	Great Britain	64.15 m	2	
8	Lukas Weißhaidinger	Austria	62.62 m	1	SB

=== Women's ===
400 metres
Place	Athlete	Nation	Time	Points	Notes
1st place, gold medalist(s)	Isabella Whittaker	United States	49.78	8	
2nd place, silver medalist(s)	Henriette Jæger	Norway	50.07	7	
3rd place, bronze medalist(s)	Amber Anning	Great Britain	50.17	6	SB
4	Lieke Klaver	Netherlands	50.35	5	SB
5	Martina Weil	Chile	50.39	4	NR
6	Rhasidat Adeleke	Ireland	50.48	3	
7	Sada Williams	Barbados	50.94	2	=SB
8	Andrea Miklós	Romania	51.91	1	SB

800 metres
Place	Athlete	Nation	Time	Points	Notes
1st place, gold medalist(s)	Georgia Bell	Great Britain	1:57.66	8	SB
2nd place, silver medalist(s)	Mary Moraa	Kenya	1:57.83	7	SB
3rd place, bronze medalist(s)	Prudence Sekgodiso	South Africa	1:58.00	6	
4	Audrey Werro	Switzerland	1:58.35	5	
5	Jemma Reekie	Great Britain	1:58.66	4	SB
6	Oratile Nowe	Botswana	1:58.78	3	
7	Addison Wiley	United States	1:58.86	2	
8	Eloisa Coiro	Italy	2:00.20	1	
—	Margarita Koczanowa	Poland	DNF		PM

100 metres hurdles
Place	Athlete	Nation	Time	Points	Notes
1st place, gold medalist(s)	Grace Stark	United States	12.33	8	MR, SB
2nd place, silver medalist(s)	Ackera Nugent	Jamaica	12.37	7	
3rd place, bronze medalist(s)	Nadine Visser	Netherlands	12.49	6	SB
4	Devynne Charlton	Bahamas	12.59	5	SB
5	Kendra Harrison	United States	12.69 [.682]	4	
6	Giada Carmassi	Italy	12.69 [.686]	3	NR
7	Pia Skrzyszowska	Poland	12.79	2	
8	Alaysha Johnson	United States	12.84	1	
			Wind: (+1.4 m/s)		

400 metres hurdles
Place	Athlete	Nation	Time	Points	Notes
1st place, gold medalist(s)	Femke Bol	Netherlands	52.11	8	MR, SB
2nd place, silver medalist(s)	Dalilah Muhammad	United States	52.91	7	SB
3rd place, bronze medalist(s)	Gianna Woodruff	Panama	53.99	6	SB
4	Elena Kelety	Germany	54.79	5	PB
5	Amalie Iuel	Norway	54.84	4	
6	Moa Granat	Sweden	55.37	3	PB
7	Sarah Carli	Australia	55.43	2	
8	Ayomide Folorunso	Italy	55.98	1	

High jump
Place	Athlete	Nation	Height	Points	Notes
1st place, gold medalist(s)	Nicola Olyslagers	Australia	2.01 m	8	=SB
2nd place, silver medalist(s)	Yaroslava Mahuchikh	Ukraine	1.99 m	7	
3rd place, bronze medalist(s)	Maria Żodzik	Poland	1.93 m	6	
4	Vashti Cunningham	United States	1.91 m	5	
4	Yuliya Levchenko	Ukraine	1.91 m	5	
4	Engla Nilsson	Sweden	1.91 m	5	
4	Eleanor Patterson	Australia	1.91 m	5	
8	Angelina Topić	Serbia	1.91 m	1	
9	Christina Honsel	Germany	1.91 m		

Pole vault
Place	Athlete	Nation	Height	Points	Notes
1st place, gold medalist(s)	Sandi Morris	United States	4.82 m	8	SB
2nd place, silver medalist(s)	Angelica Moser	Switzerland	4.63 m	7	
3rd place, bronze medalist(s)	Roberta Bruni	Italy	4.53 m	6	
4	Gabriela Leon	United States	4.53 m	5	
5	Tina Šutej	Slovenia	4.38 m	4	
6	Emily Grove	United States	4.23 m	3	
—	Elina Lampela	Finland	NM		
—	Elisa Molinarolo	Italy	NM		

Long jump
Place	Athlete	Nation	Distance	Points	Notes
1st place, gold medalist(s)	Tara Davis-Woodhall	United States	7.05 m (+1.3 m/s)	8	=MR, SB
2nd place, silver medalist(s)	Larissa Iapichino	Italy	6.90 m (+3.6 m/s)	7	
3rd place, bronze medalist(s)	Jasmine Moore	United States	6.76 m (+2.4 m/s)	6	
4	Malaika Mihambo	Germany	6.75 m (+0.7 m/s)	5	
5	Claire Bryant	United States	6.74 m (+1.0 m/s)	4	
6	Annik Kälin	Switzerland	6.67 m (+0.8 m/s)	3	
7	Maja Åskag	Sweden	6.66 m (+1.6 m/s)	2	
8	Monae' Nichols	United States	6.55 m (+2.1 m/s)	1	
9	Ackelia Smith	Jamaica	6.55 m (+0.6 m/s)		
10	Ivana Španović	Serbia	6.51 m (+0.8 m/s)		SB

== Promotional events results ==
=== Men's ===
100 metres
Place	Athlete	Nation	Time	Notes
1st place, gold medalist(s)	Benjamin Azamati	Ghana	10.18	
2nd place, silver medalist(s)	Bradley Nkoana	South Africa	10.23	
3rd place, bronze medalist(s)	Kyree King	United States	10.27	
4	Edvin Sidwall	Sweden	10.35	PB
5	Zion Eriksson	Sweden	10.45	SB
6	Jean-Christian Zirignon	Sweden	10.47 [.461]	SB
7	Linus Pihl	Sweden	10.47 [.464]	SB
—	Gift Leotlela	South Africa	DQ	TR 16.8
			Wind: (+0.9 m/s)	

1500 metres
Place	Athlete	Nation	Time	Notes
1st place, gold medalist(s)	Samuel Pihlström	Sweden	3:31.53	
2nd place, silver medalist(s)	Federico Riva	Italy	3:32.17	
3rd place, bronze medalist(s)	Kristian Uldbjerg Hansen	Denmark	3:32.60	PB
4	Mohamed Attaoui	Spain	3:32.63	PB
5	George Mills	Great Britain	3:32.67	SB
6	Narve Gilje Nordås	Norway	3:32.78	SB
7	Festus Lagat	Kenya	3:32.97	
8	Sam Tanner	New Zealand	3:33.06	SB
9	Abraham Alvarado	United States	3:33.21	PB
10	Luke Houser	United States	3:33.99	PB
11	Ruben Verheyden	Belgium	3:34.01	
12	Jonatan Grahn	Sweden	3:38.01	SB
—	Mounir Akbache	France	DNF	PM
—	Boaz Kiprugut	Kenya	DNF	PM

3000 metres steeplechase
Place	Athlete	Nation	Time	Notes
1st place, gold medalist(s)	Karl Bebendorf	Germany	8:11.81	
2nd place, silver medalist(s)	Geordie Beamish	New Zealand	8:13.86	SB
3rd place, bronze medalist(s)	Faid El Mostafa	Morocco	8:14.04	PB
4	Ala Zoghlami	Italy	8:14.38	SB
5	Getnet Wale	Ethiopia	8:15.57	SB
6	Jacob Boutera	Norway	8:15.69	PB
7	Djilali Bedrani	France	8:16.39	
8	Vidar Johansson	Sweden	8:17.89	PB
9	Jean-Simon Desgagnés	Canada	8:20.01	SB
10	Nicolas-Marie Daru	France	8:24.78	
11	Tomáš Habarta	Czech Republic	8:28.90	SB
12	Dinka Fikadu	Ethiopia	8:32.76	
—	Leo Magnusson	Sweden	DNF	
—	Wilberforce Kones	Kenya	DNF	PM
—	Wesley Langat	Kenya	DNF	PM

=== Women's ===
200 metres
Place	Athlete	Nation	Time	Notes
1st place, gold medalist(s)	Thelma Davies	Liberia	22.41	
2nd place, silver medalist(s)	Jaël Bestué	Spain	22.69	
3rd place, bronze medalist(s)	Gina Lückenkemper	Germany	22.76	
4	Bassant Hemida	Egypt	22.84 [.834]	
5	Bianca Williams	Great Britain	22.84 [.839]	
6	Boglárka Takács	Hungary	23.09	
7	Nora Lindahl	Sweden	23.23	
8	Torrie Lewis	Australia	23.50	
			Wind: (+2.2 m/s)	

Discus throw
Place	Athlete	Nation	Distance	Notes
1st place, gold medalist(s)	Kristin Pudenz	Germany	64.85 m	
2nd place, silver medalist(s)	Jorinde van Klinken	Netherlands	64.33 m	
3rd place, bronze medalist(s)	Denia Caballero	Cuba	63.32 m	
4	Marike Steinacker	Germany	63.10 m	
5	Claudine Vita	Germany	62.13 m	
6	Liliana Cá	Portugal	61.97 m	
7	Vanessa Kamga	Sweden	60.31 m	
8	Laulauga Tausaga	United States	59.79 m	

== See also ==
- 2025 Diamond League
