= Athlos =

US women's track and field meet

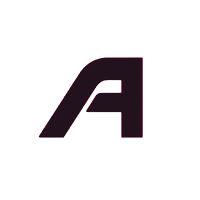
- Genre: Outdoor track and field
- Venue: Icahn Stadium; StoneX Stadium
- Locations: New York City; London
- Country: United States; United Kingdom
- Inaugurated: 2024
- Founder: Alexis Ohanian
- Website: Official website

Athlos is a professional, female-only track and field meeting series that was first held at Icahn Stadium in New York City on September 26, 2024. In 2026, the event became a two-event series with the addition of the Athlos: London meet, held at the StoneX Stadium in Barnet, London.

== History, premise ==
The first meeting was originally announced in April 2024 and was initially referred to as the "776 Invitational". It was inspired by the success of the Angel City FC club and a desire to showcase women's track and field more often than once every four years for the Summer Olympics.

Named after the Greek word for athletics, the first meeting was intended to highlight women's track and field and make the sport a spectator-friendly experience by simplifying the number of events down to six. It included the 100 m, 100 m hurdles, 200 m, 400 m, 800 m, and 1500 m. It featured a total of 36 athletes competing in these six events, including Gabby Thomas, Alexis Holmes, and Faith Kipyegon. After the races ended, Megan Thee Stallion performed, concluding her Hot Girl Summer Tour.

The first edition was described as entertaining with good feedback from athletes, but LetsRun.com noted that the meeting had an uncertain future due to fan response.

The second edition of Athlos was held on October 10, 2025 and included the long jump, which Tara Davis-Woodhall headlined.

The third edition introduced a second meet, Athlos: London, held in September, with the event now becoming an aggregate series for prize purposes.

== Prize money ==
The meeting also provided the following prize money for competitors based on what place they finish in their event.

Place	Prize Money
1	$60,000.00
2	$25,000.00
3	$10,000.00
4	$8,000.00
5	$5,000.00
6	$2,500.00

== Results ==
=== 2024 ===
The meet took place at Icahn Stadium on September 26.

Place	Event					
Place	100 m	100 m hurdles	200 m	400 m	800 m	1500 m
1	Marie-Josee Ta Lou-Smith (CIV)	Jasmine Camacho-Quinn (PUR)	Brittany Brown (USA)	Marileidy Paulino (DOM)	Tsige Duguma (ETH)	Faith Kipyegon (KEN)
2	Brittany Brown (USA)	Alaysha Johnson (USA)	Gabby Thomas (USA)	Alexis Holmes (USA)	Mary Moraa (KEN)	Diribe Welteji (ETH)
3	Candace Hill (USA)	Masai Russell (USA)	Anavia Battle (USA)	Salwa Eid Naser (BRN)	Natoya Goule-Toppin (JAM)	Susan Ejore-Sanders (KEN)
4	Daryll Neita (GBR)	Tonea Marshall (USA)	Jenna Prandini (USA)	Shamier Little (USA)	Addy Wiley (USA)	Gudaf Tsegay (ETH)
5	Zoe Hobbs (NZL)	Danielle Williams (JAM)	Tamara Clark (USA)	Lieke Klaver (NED)	Halimah Nakaayi (UGA)	Cory McGee (USA)
6	Celera Barnes (USA)	Charisma Taylor (BAH)	Torrie Lewis (AUS)	Lynna Irby-Jackson (USA)	Nia Akins (USA)	Katie Snowden (GBR)

=== 2025 ===
The long jump competition was held in Times Square on October 9 and the other events were held at Icahn Stadium on October 10.

Place	Event						
Place	100 m	100 m hurdles	200 m	400 m	800 m	Mile	Long Jump
1	Brittany Brown (USA)	Masai Russell (USA)	Brittany Brown (USA)	Marileidy Paulino (DOM)	Keely Hodgkinson (GBR)	Faith Kipyegon (KEN)	Tara Davis-Woodhall (USA)
2	Jacious Sears (USA)	Grace Stark (USA)	Anavia Battle (USA)	Salwa Eid Naser (BRN)	Georgia Hunter Bell (GBR)	Gudaf Tsegay (ETH)	Quanesha Burks (USA)
3	Kayla White (USA)	Alaysha Johnson (USA)	Marie Josée Ta Lou-Smith (CIV)	Henriette Jæger (NOR)	Shafiqua Maloney (VIN)	Nikki Hiltz (USA)	Jasmine Moore (USA)
4	Marie Josée Ta Lou-Smith (CIV)	Devynne Charlton (BAH)	McKenzie Long (USA)	Alexis Holmes (USA)	Natoya Goule-Toppin (JAM)	Freweyni Hailu (ETH)	Claire Bryant (USA)
5	Jonielle Smith (JAM)	Tonea Marshall (USA)	Jessika Gbai (CIV)	Lynna Irby-Jackson (USA)	Halimah Nakaayi (UGA)	Susan Ejore-Sanders (KEN)	Jazmin Sawyers (GBR)
6	Zoe Hobbs (NZL)	Megan Tapper (JAM)	Amy Hunt (GBR)	Amber Anning (GBR)	Emily Richards (USA)	Rebecca Ochan (USA) PM	Monae' Nichols (USA)

=== 2026 ===
The event was set to expand in 2026, with a meeting on September 18 at StoneX Stadium, Barnet, London added to the existing meet in Icahn Stadium, New York, scheduled for October 2. On August 29, the New York meet was cancelled.

Results for the London meet were:

Place	Event						
Place	100 m	100 m hurdles	200 m	400 m	800 m	Mile	Long Jump
1	Sha'Carri Richardson (USA)	Alaysha Johnson (USA)	Gabby Thomas (USA)	Marileidy Paulino (DOM)	Keely Hodgkinson (GBR)	Klaudia Kazimierska (POL)	Alyssa Jones (USA)
2	Zoe Hobbs (NZL)	Tobi Amusan (NGR)	Kayla White (USA)	Henriette Jæger (NOR)	Valentina Rosamilia (SUI)	Georgia Hunter Bell (GBR)	Hilary Kpatcha (FRA)
3	Anavia Battle (USA)	Devynne Charlton (BAH)	Anavia Battle (USA)	Nickisha Pryce (JAM)	Rénelle Lamote (FRA)	Dorcus Ewoi (KEN)	Monae' Nichols (USA)
4	Imani Lansiquot (GBR)	Danielle Williams (JAM)	Rhasidat Adeleke (IRE)	Lieke Klaver (NED)	Juliette Whittaker (USA)	Nikki Hiltz (USA)	Agate de Sousa (POR)
5	Daryll Neita (GBR)	Megan Simmonds (JAM)	Shaunae Miller-Uibo (BAH)	Stacey-Ann Williams (JAM)	Sophie O'Sullivan (IRE)	Jessica Hull (AUS)	Claire Bryant (USA)
6	Sade McCreath (CAN)	Rayniah Jones (USA)	Sade McCreath (CAN)	Natalia Bukowiecka (POL)	Raevyn Rogers (USA)	Kate Axford (GBR)	Iryna Budzynska (UKR)

== Meeting records ==
Event	Record	Athlete	Nation	Date
100 m	10.80	Sha'Carri Richardson	United States	18 September 2026
200 m	21.89	Brittany Brown	United States	10 October 2025
400 m	48.73	Marileidy Paulino	Dominican Republic	18 September 2026
800 m	1:56.40	Keely Hodgkinson	Great Britain	18 September 2026
1500 m	4:04.79	Faith Kipyegon	Kenya	26 September 2024
Mile	4:17.78	Faith Kipyegon	Kenya	10 October 2025
100 m hurdles	12.36	Jasmine Camacho-Quinn	Puerto Rico	26 September 2024
Long jump	7.13 m (23 ft 4 1/2 in)	Tara Davis-Woodhall	United States	9 October 2025
