= Alyssa Jones (long jumper) =

American athlete

Personal information
- Born: 6 February 2004 (age 22)

Sport
- Sport: Athletics
- Events: Long jump, High jump

Achievements and titles
- Personal bests: Long jump: 7.09m (Fayetteville, 2026); High jump: 1.90m (Eugene, 2025)
Medal record
Women's athletics
Representing United States
World Ultimate Championship
Third place	2026 Budapest	Long jump
NACAC Championships
Gold medal – first place	2025 Freeport	Long jump

Alyssa Jones (born 6 February 2004) is an American track and field athlete who competes in the long jump and the high jump. She won the long jump at the 2026 USA Outdoor Track and Field Championships and placed third in the long jump at the inaugural World Ultimate Championship later that year.

Jones was a gold medalist in the long jump at the 2025 NACAC Championships, and later also won the long jump title at the 2026 NCAA Championships.

== Early life ==
While attending Robert Morgan Senior High School she competed for Miami Southridge Senior High School in Florida in track and field. She won four events at the Florida state high school track and field championships in 2022, including the 100 metres and 200 metres, retaining her title in the high jump setting - new Florida state high school record in the long jump (6.38 metres). She won the long jump and finished second in the high jump at the New Balance National Championships on 19 June 2022. She then attended Stanford University.

== NCAA ==
Competing as a Stanford Cardinal she had a fourth place finish in the long jump at the 2023 NCAA Indoor Championships in Albuquerque, New Mexico in March 2023. She jumped 6.86 metres to finish runner-up behind Ackelia Smith in the long jump at the 2023 NCAA Indoor Championships in Austin, Texas in June 2023. Later that summer, she won the USATF U20 Championships long jump title.

She placed third in the long jump at the 2024 NCAA Indoor Championships in Boston, Massachusetts in March 2024. She jumped 6.64 metres to finish third behind Ackelia Smith and Claire Bryant in the long jump at the 2024 NCAA Indoor Championships in Eugene, Oregon in June 2024.

She placed third in the long jump at the 2025 NCAA Indoor Championships in Virginia Beach in March 2025. She placed second in the long jump at the 2025 NCAA Outdoor Championships on 12 June. Two days later she jumped 1.90 meters to place fourth in the high jump at the championships.

On 17 January 2026, Jones set a meet record in the women's high jump with 1.91m (6-3.25) at the Washington Preview in Seattle. The following month, she won the high jump, clearing 1.86m, and placed second in the long jump, at the ACC Indoor Championships. She qualified for the 2026 NCAA Division I Indoor Track and Field Championships in both disciplines, placing second to Sophia Beckmon in the long jump on 13 March, with jones making a best jump of 6.70 metres.

Jones became the first Stanford Cardinal to earn Most Valuable Performer honors at the 2026 ACC Outdoor Championships, having won the high jump and the long jump, breaking the ACC and meet records in the long jump. Jones also ran the 100 m dash, placing third. In May, Jones also jumped a lifetime best of 7.09 meters to win the women's long jump competition at the NCAA Division 1 West Outdoor Regionals in Fayetteville, Arkansas. The distance moved her to second on the NCAA all-time list. On 11 June, Jones won the long jump at the 2026 NCAA Division I Outdoor Track and Field Championships with a jump of 7.06 metres.

== Professional career ==
She jumped a personal best 6.90 metres to finish fourth in the long jump at the 2025 USA Outdoor Track and Field Championships with the same distance as the third placed jumper Quanesha Burks but placed lower on their secondary marks. She also jumped 1.80 metres to place seventh in the high jump at the championships.

She won the gold medal in the long jump at the 2025 NACAC Championships in The Bahamas on 15 August 2025, with a jump of 6.74 metres (+0.2).

On 4 July 2026, Jones jumped 6.99 metres to place fourth at the 2026 Prefontaine Classic. On 26 July 2026, Jones won the long jump at the 2026 USA Outdoor Track and Field Championships in New York, with a best jump of 6.96 metres, finishing ahead of Monae' Nichols and defending champion Tara Davis-Woodhall, whose appeal against a foul-jump ruling on her final round effort was denied. It was the first long jump defeat for Davis-Woodall since the 2023 World Championships. In August, she won at the 2026 Kamila Skolimowska Memorial in Silesia, Poland, with Jones and Agate de Sousa both recording a meeting record of 6.98m to top the long jump standings, and Jones taking the win on countback. On 11 September, Jones placed third in the long jump at the inaugural 2026 World Athletics Ultimate Championship in Budapest. On 18 September, she won the long jump at Athlos in London.
