= 2026 World Athletics Ultimate Championship – Women's long jump =

Women's long jump at the 2026 World Athletics Ultimate Championship
- Venue: National Athletics Centre
- Location: Budapest, Hungary
- Dates: 11 September 2026 (final)
- Competitors: 8 from 6 nations
- Winning time: 6.90 m

Champion
- Larissa Iapichino; Italy

The women's long jump was held as a straight final at the 2026 World Athletics Ultimate Championship at the National Athletics Centre in Budapest, Hungary on 11 September 2026. It was the first time the World Ultimate Championship is held. Athletes qualified by wildcard or by their world ranking.

== Background ==
Global records before the 2026 World Athletics Ultimate Championship
Record	Distance	Athlete (nation)	Location	Date
World record	7.52 m	Galina Chistyakova (URS)	Leningrad, Soviet Union	11 June 1988
World lead	7.20 m	Tara Davis-Woodhall (USA)	Los Angeles, United States	14 June 2026

Area records before the 2026 World Athletics Ultimate Championship
Record	Distance	Athlete (nation)	Location	Date
African record	7.17 m	Ese Brume (NGR)	Chula Vista, United States	29 May 2021
Asian record	7.01 m	Yao Weili (CHN)	Jinan, China	4 June 1993
European record	7.52 m	Galina Chistyakova (URS)	Leningrad, Soviet Union	11 June 1988
North, Central American, and Caribbean record	7.49 m	Jackie Joyner-Kersee (USA)	New York City, United States	22 May 1994
North, Central American, and Caribbean record	7.49 m	Jackie Joyner-Kersee (USA)	Sestriere, Italy	31 July 1994
Oceanian record	7.13 m	Brooke Buschkuehl (AUS)	Chula Vista, United States	9 July 2022
South American record	7.26 m	Maurren Higa Maggi (BRA)	Bogotá, Colombia	25 June 1999

== Qualification ==
For the long jump, eight athletes qualified, up to three by wildcard for winners of the event at the 2024 Summer Olympic, the 2025 World Athletics Championships, or the 2026 Diamond League final and the others by their position at the World Athletics Rankings for the event on 3 September 2026.

== Results ==
=== Final ===
The final was held on 11 September at 20:53 (UTC+2).

Place	Athlete	Nation	Round				Result	Notes
Place	Athlete	Nation	#1	#2	#3	#4	Result	Notes
1st place, gold medalist(s)	Larissa Iapichino	Italy	6.90 (+0.6 m/s)	6.76 (+2.1 m/s)	x	x	6.90 m (+0.6 m/s)	
2	Jazmin Sawyers	Great Britain	x	6.59 (+0.9 m/s)	6.54 (−0.5 m/s)	6.78 (+0.9 m/s)	6.78 m (+0.9 m/s)	
3	Alyssa Jones	United States	6.77 (+0.1 m/s)	6.71 (+1.4 m/s)	x	6.56 (+0.7 m/s)	6.77 m (+0.1 m/s)	
4	Hilary Kpatcha	France	6.48 (−0.4 m/s)	6.73 (+1.1 m/s)	6.20 (−0.7 m/s)	6.26 (+0.8 m/s)	6.73 m (+1.1 m/s)	
5	Claire Bryant	United States	6.41 (−0.1 m/s)	6.38 (+0.5 m/s)	6.52 (+0.2 m/s)		6.52 m (+0.2 m/s)	
6	Agate de Sousa	Portugal	6.35 (+0.7 m/s)	6.47 (+0.7 m/s)	6.41 (+0.3 m/s)		6.47 m (+0.7 m/s)	
7	Monae' Nichols	United States	6.39 (+0.1 m/s)	6.33 (+1.4 m/s)			6.39 m (+0.1 m/s)	
8	Marthe Koala	Burkina Faso	6.15 (+0.3 m/s)	6.21 (+1.4 m/s)			6.21 m (+1.4 m/s)	
