= 2018 IAAF World U20 Championships – Women's long jump =

Women's long jump at the 2018 World U20 Championships
- Venue: Ratina Stadium
- Dates: 12 July (qualification); 13 July (final)
- Competitors: 21 from 14 nations
- Winning distance: 6.51 m

Medalists
gold medal	Lea-Jasmin Riecke	Germany
silver medal	Ayaka Kora	Japan
bronze medal	Tara Davis	United States

The women's long jump at the 2018 IAAF World U20 Championships was held at Ratina Stadium on 12 and 13 July.

== Records ==
Standing records prior to the 2018 IAAF World U20 Championships
World U20 Record	Heike Drechsler (GDR)	7.14	Bratislava, Czechoslovakia	4 June 1983
Championship Record	Fiona May (GBR)	6.88	Sudbury, Canada	30 July 1988
World U20 Leading	Tara Davis (USA)	6.71	Bloomington, United States	16 June 2018

== Results ==
=== Qualification ===
The qualification round took place on 12 July, in two groups, both starting at 10:18. Athletes attaining a mark of at least 6.25 metres ( Q ) or at least the 12 best performers ( q ) qualified for the final.

Rank	Group	Name	Nationality	Round			Mark	Notes
Rank	Group	Name	Nationality	1	2	3	Mark	Notes
1	B	Tara Davis	United States	6.10	6.40		6.40	Q, YC
2	A	Adéla Záhorová	Czech Republic	6.33			6.33	Q, PB
3	A	Gong Luying	China	6.23	6.26		6.26	Q, SB
4	A	Petra Farkas	Hungary	6.16	6.08	6.21	6.21	q
5	B	Lucy Hadaway	Great Britain	6.09	6.01	6.19	6.19	q
6	A	Amanda Hansson	Sweden	5.76	6.07	6.19	6.19	q
7	A	Ayaka Kora	Japan	6.17	5.99	6.13	6.17	q
8	B	Du Jiani	China	6.12	6.05	x	6.12	q
9	A	Jasmine Moore	United States	6.10	5.93	6.11	6.11	q
10	A	Susana Hernández	Mexico	5.78	6.07	5.79	6.07	q
11	B	Klaudia Endrész	Hungary	5.86	6.02	5.85	6.02	q
12	B	Lea-Jasmin Riecke	Germany	6.01	5.99	3.77	6.01	q
13	B	Dominika Łykowska	Poland	5.95	5.93	5.95	5.95	
14	A	Merle Homeier	Germany	5.81	5.93	5.86	5.93	
15	B	Grace Brennan	Australia	5.62	5.93	5.84	5.93	
16	A	Holly Mills	Great Britain	x	x	5.92	5.92	
17	A	Ackelia Smith	Jamaica	5.71	5.90	5.70	5.90	
18	B	Tatiana Aholou	Canada	5.84	5.78	x	5.84	
19	B	Chiaki Kawazoe	Japan	5.71	5.81	5.69	5.81	
20	B	Olivia Mäkinen	Finland	5.65	x	5.67	5.67	
21	B	Susan Francis	Jamaica	x	x	5.47	5.47	

=== Final ===
The final was held on 13 July at 19:49.

Rank	Name	Nationality	Round						Mark	Notes
Rank	Name	Nationality	1	2	3	4	5	6	Mark	Notes
1st place, gold medalist(s)	Lea-Jasmin Riecke	Germany	6.06	6.51	6.15	x	6.00	6.25	6.51	PB
2nd place, silver medalist(s)	Ayaka Kora	Japan	x	6.37	5.87	6.19	6.24	6.17	6.37	
3rd place, bronze medalist(s)	Tara Davis	United States	5.83	6.25	6.03	6.07	6.25	6.36	6.36	
4	Gong Luying	China	5.80	5.83	6.19	5.87	x	5.76	6.19	
5	Petra Farkas	Hungary	6.09	6.16	6.09	6.02	6.06	6.09	6.16	
6	Lucy Hadaway	Great Britain	6.02	6.13	5.71	6.13	x	6.07	6.13	
7	Klaudia Endrész	Hungary	5.95	5.92	6.07	5.88	6.08	x	6.08	
8	Amanda Hansson	Sweden	x	6.03	6.00	5.79	x	x	6.03	
9	Adéla Záhorová	Czech Republic	4.07	6.00	5.88				6.00	
10	Jasmine Moore	United States	5.89	5.77	5.99				5.99	
11	Susana Hernández	Mexico	5.90	x	5.85				5.90	
12	Du Jiani	China	5.74	x	5.80				5.80	
