= 2025 World Athletics Indoor Championships – Women's long jump =

Women's long jump at the 2025 World Athletics Indoor Championships
- Venue: Nanjing's Cube at Nanjing Youth Olympic Sports Park
- Location: Nanjing, China
- Dates: 23 March
- Competitors: 13 from 12 nations
- Winning distance: 6.96 m

Medalists
gold medal	Claire Bryant	United States
silver medal	Annik Kälin	Switzerland
bronze medal	Fátima Diame	Spain

The women's long jump at the 2025 World Athletics Indoor Championships took place on the short track of the Nanjing's Cube at Nanjing Youth Olympic Sports Park in Nanjing, China, on 23 March 2025. This was the 21st time the event is contested at the World Athletics Indoor Championships. Athletes could qualify by achieving the entry standard or by their World Athletics Ranking in the event.

The final took place on 23 March during the morning session.

== Background ==
The women's long jump was contested 20 times before 2025, at every previous edition of the World Athletics Indoor Championships.

Records before the 2025 World Athletics Indoor Championships
Record	Athlete (nation)	Distance (m)	Location	Date
World record	Heike Drechsler (GDR)	7.37	Vienna, Austria	13 February 1988
Championship record	Brittney Reese (USA)	7.23	Istanbul, Turkey	11 March 2012
World leading	Malaika Mihambo (GER)	7.07	Karlsruhe, Germany	7 February 2025

== Qualification ==
For the women's long jump, the qualification period ran from 1 September 2024 until 9 March 2025. Athletes could qualify by achieving the entry standards of 6.90 m. Athletes could also qualify by virtue of their World Athletics Ranking for the event or by virtue of their World Athletics Indoor Tour wildcard. There was a target number of 16 athletes.

== Final ==
The final was held on 23 March, starting at 10:19 (UTC+8) in the morning.

Place	Athlete	Nation	#1	#2	#3	#4	#5	#6	Result	Notes
1st place, gold medalist(s)	Claire Bryant	United States	6.76	6.72	6.90	x	6.96	x	6.96 m	PB
2nd place, silver medalist(s)	Annik Kälin	Switzerland	x	6.63	6.59	6.46	6.66	6.83 m	6.83	
3rd place, bronze medalist(s)	Fátima Diame	Spain	6.72	x	6.50	x	6.46	6.41	6.72 m	
4	Plamena Mitkova	Bulgaria	x	x	6.63	x	–	x	6.63 m	
5	Alina Rotaru-Kottmann	Romania	6.30	6.59	6.54	6.36	x	6.48	6.59 m	SB
6	Anthaya Charlton	Bahamas	6.24	x	6.48	6.57	6.46	6.49	6.57 m	
7	Anna Matuszewicz	Poland	6.10	x	6.47	6.56	5.94		6.56 m	
8	Monae' Nichols	United States	6.49	x	x	x	x		6.49 m	
9	Jessica Kähärä	Finland	6.14	6.44	6.37	6.39			6.44 m	
10	Funminiyi Olajide	Great Britain	6.38	x	6.41	6.38			6.41 m	
11	Huang Yingying	China	6.24	x	6.39 m				6.39	
12	Tyra Gittens	Trinidad and Tobago	6.27	6.36	6.05				6.36 m	
13	Milica Gardašević	Serbia	x	6.33	x				6.33 m	
