= Claire Bryant =

American long jumper (born 2001)

Personal information
- Nationality: United States
- Born: 25 August 2001 (age 25)

Sport
- Sport: Athletics
- Event: Long jump

Achievements and titles
- Personal bests: Long jump: 6.96m (Nanjing, 2025)
Medal record
Women's athletics
Representing United States
World Indoor Championships
Gold medal – first place	2025 Nanjing	Long jump
Diamond League
Third place	2026	Long jump
NACAC U23 Championships
Silver medal – second place	2023 San Jose	Long jump
Pan American U20 Championships
Gold medal – first place	2019 San José	Long jump

Claire Bryant (born 25 August 2001) is an American long jumper. She won the gold medal at the 2025 World Athletics Indoor Championships.

== Early life ==
From Houston, Texas, she attended Memorial High School. She was a member of Houston Christian Track Club.

== Career ==
She was the 2018 Texas UIL state champion and the 2019 US U20 national champion in the long jump. She won gold at the 2019 Pan American U20 Athletics Championships, in the long jump. She committed to the University of Florida in October 2019.

She won silver behind compatriot Sophia Beckmon in the long jump at the 2023 NACAC U23 Championships in San Jose, Costa Rica in July 2023, with a wind assisted jump of 6.66 metres in the fifth round.

She finished as the runner-up in the women's long jump at the NCAA Indoor Championships in March 2024, in Boston, Massachusetts. She won the SEC Championship for Florida Gators in May 2024. She was then runner-up at the NCAA Outdoor Championship long jump in Eugene, Oregon in June 2024, with a jump of 6.74 metres. Her efforts helped the Florida Gators win the NCAA Track and Field Championship.

She was selected for the 2025 World Athletics Indoor Championships in Nanjing in March 2025, where she won the gold medal on her senior international debut, with a personal best jump of 6.96 metres, achieved in the fifth round. On 12 April 2025, she jumped 6.79 meters to win on the World Athletics Continental Tour in Gaborone, Botswana. In May 2025, she defeated Olympic bronze medalist Jasmine Moore in the women's long jump at the Atlanta City Games, jumping a wind-assisted 7.03 meters on her final jump. She placed fifth overall in June 2025 in Stockholm at the 2025 BAUHAUS-galan event, part of the 2025 Diamond League. She jumped 6.80 metres to finish third at the 2025 Prefontaine Classic on 5 July.

She jumped 6.97 metres (+2.1) to place second overall behind Tara Davis-Woodhall in the long jump at the 2025 USA Outdoor Track and Field Championships. She placed third in the Diamond League at the 2025 Kamila Skolimowska Memorial, in Poland, on 16 August. She placed fourth with a jump of 6.66 metres at the Diamond League Final in Zurich on 28 August. In September 2025, she placed fifth at the 2025 World Championships in Tokyo, Japan.

In February 2026, she was third behind Jasmine Moore and Monae' Nichols in the long jump at the 2026 USA Indoor Track and Field Championships with a best jump of 6.69 metres. In May, she placed fourth at the 2026 Shanghai Diamond League. Competing at the 2026 London Athletics Meet on 18 July, Bryant placed second with a jump of 6.94m. At the 2026 Diamond League Final in Brussels in September, she placed third with a jump of 6.83 metres. On 11 September, she placed fifth in the long jump at the inaugural 2026 World Athletics Ultimate Championship in Budapest.

== International Competition ==
Representing the United States
Year	Competition	Venue	Position	Event	Notes
2019	Pan American U20 Championships	San José, Costa Rica	1st	Long jump	6.15 m
2023	NACAC U23 Championships	San José, Costa Rica	2nd	Long jump	6.66 m (w)
2025	World Indoor Championships	Nanjing, China	1st	Long jump	6.96 m
2025	World Championships	Tokyo, Japan	5th	Long jump	6.68 m
2026	World Ultimate Championship	Budapest, Hungary	5th	Long jump	6.52 m
