= Tyra Gittens-Spotsville =

Athlete from Trinidad and Tobago

Personal information
- Born: Tyra Gittens; 6 June 1998 (age 28) Tunapuna–Piarco, Trinidad and Tobago
- Height: 5 ft 9 in (175 cm)

Sport
- Sport: Track and Field
- Events: Long jump, High jump, Heptathlon
- Turned pro: 2022
Medal record
Women's athletics
Representing Trinidad and Tobago
NACAC Championships
Bronze medal – third place	2025 Freeport	Long jump

Tyra Gittens-Spotsville (née Gittens; born 6 June 1998) is an Olympic athlete from Trinidad and Tobago. Gittens set 6 national records for Trinidad and Tobago indoor records in Pentathlon 4746 points, high jump 1.93 m (6 ft 4 in), and long jump 6.68 m (21 ft 11 in), Trinidad and Tobago outdoor records in Heptathlon 6418 points, high jump 1.95 m (6 ft 5 in), and long jump 6.96 m (22 ft 10 in).

== Early life ==
Her hometown is Saint Augustine, Trinidad and Tobago, and she went to high school in Nashville at The Ensworth School before attending Texas A&M University to complete a bachelor's degree and the University of Texas at Austin to pursue a master's degree.

== Career ==
In July 2017, Gittens-Spotsville broke her own national junior heptathlon record in winning the Pan American Combined Events Cup in Ottawa, Canada, gaining 5,490 points in the seven-discipline event to improve on the 5,337-point standard she had established in 2016.

Competing in the long jump at the 2022 World Athletics Championships Gittens-Spotsville finished 19th in the qualifying heats with a best jump of 6.44m. Gittens has had an ongoing Therapeutic Use Exemption (TUE) for treatment for ADHD. However, a failure to complete the application for a renewal of the TUE correctly led to a positive test for methylphenidate/ritalinic acid at the World Championships and a six-month doping violation ban.

She finished twelfth at the 2025 World Athletics Indoor Championships in Nanjing, China on 23 March 2025, with a best jump of 6.36 metres. She won the bronze medal in the long jump at the 2025 NACAC Championships in The Bahamas. In September 2025, she competed at the 2025 World Championships in Tokyo, Japan.

In March 2026, she placed fifteenth at the 2026 World Athletics Indoor Championships in Toruń, Poland. In June, she jumped 6.65 metres to win the national long jump title. She placed fifth in the long jump at the 2026 Commonwealth Games in Glasgow, Scotland.

== Competition history ==
Year	Competition	Venue	Position	Event	Notes
Representing Trinidad and Tobago
2025	World Indoor Championships	Nanjing, China	12th	Long jump	6.36 m (20 ft 10 in)
2022	Commonwealth Games	Birmingham, Great Britain	11th	Long jump	6.27 m (20 ft 7 in)
2022	Commonwealth Games	Birmingham, Great Britain	14th	High jump	1.76 m (5 ft 9 in)
2022	World Athletics Championships	Eugene, United States	19th	Long jump	6.44 m (21 ft 2 in)
2021	Summer Olympics	Tokyo, Japan	10th	Long jump	6.60 m (21 ft 8 in)
2018	NACAC Championships	Toronto, Canada	4th	Long Jump	6.25 m (20 ft 6 in)
2018	Central American and Caribbean Games	Barranquilla, Colombia	8th	Heptathlon	DNF
2017	Pan American U20 Championships	Trujillo, Peru	4th	heptathlon	5229 points
2017	Pan American U20 Championships	Trujillo, Peru	3rd	Long Jump	6.22 m (20 ft 5 in)
2017	CARIFTA Games U20	Willemstad, Curaçao	1st	heptathlon	4854 points
2017	CARIFTA Games U20	Willemstad, Curaçao	2nd	long jump	6.10 m (20 ft 0 in)
2017	Canadian Athletics Championships U20	Ottawa, Canada	1st	heptathlon	5490 points
2016	New Balance Nationals Outdoor	Greensboro, North Carolina	2nd	heptathlon	5164 points
2015	AAU Junior Olympic Games	Norfolk, Virginia	2nd	Heptathlon	4904 points
2015	AAU Junior Olympic Games	Norfolk, Virginia	1st	High Jump	1.75 m (5 ft 9 in)
2015	AAU Junior Olympic Games	Norfolk, Virginia	5th	Long Jump	6.10 m (20 ft 0 in)

== NCAA ==
Gittens-Spotsville is an 18-time NCAA Division I All-American, 3-time NCAA Champion, 5-time Southeastern Conference Champion, and 20-time All-SEC honoree.

Gittens-Spotsville won silver in the women's long jump at the 2021 National Collegiate Athletic Association NCAA Division I Outdoor Track and Field Championships in Eugene, Oregon. She did however win gold in the heptathlon, despite the fact she injured her ankle in the days before the event.

In June 2021, she was named to the US Track and Field Cross Country Association (USTFCCCA) National awards list, winning the Women's National Field Athlete of the Year award, as they stated that with her win at the SEC event she had become the third best performer in collegiate history in the heptathlon.

In Texas on 14 May 2021 at SEC Outdoor Track and Field Championships, she jumped 6.96m to place her inside the top 10 for the year so far and set Trinidad and Tobago records in Heptathlon 6418 points, high jump 1.95 m (6 ft 5 in), and long jump 6.96 m (22 ft 10 in). Her performance at the Southeastern Conference Outdoor Track and Field Championships (SEC) in Texas, as well as attaining the Olympic standard for the delayed 2020 Tokyo Olympics in the long jump, she won silver in the women's high jump competition with a height of 1.89m, she missed out on qualifying for the heptathlon at the 2020 Olympics on that day by just two points, accumulating 6,418 points in winning the seven-discipline event.

In Fayetteville, Arkansas on 11 March 2021 at NCAA Indoor Track and Field Championships, she jumped 6.68m to place her inside the top 10 for the year so far and set Trinidad and Tobago records in Pentathlon 4746 points, high jump 1.93 m (6 ft 4 in), and long jump 6.68 m (21 ft 11 in).

Year	Competition	Venue	Position	Event	Notes
Representing Texas Longhorns
2022	2022 NCAA Division I Outdoor Track and Field Championships	University of Oregon	9th	High Jump	1.80 m (5 ft 11 in)
2022	2022 NCAA Division I Outdoor Track and Field Championships	University of Oregon	3rd	Long Jump	6.57 m (21 ft 7 in)
2022	SEC Outdoor Track and Field Championships	Texas Tech Red Raiders track and field	3rd	High Jump	1.80 m (5 ft 11 in)
2022	SEC Outdoor Track and Field Championships	Texas Tech Red Raiders track and field	3rd	Long Jump	6.57 m (21 ft 7 in)
2022	2022 NCAA Division I Indoor Track and Field Championships	Birmingham CrossPlex	2nd	High Jump	1.89 m (6 ft 2 in)
2022	2022 NCAA Division I Indoor Track and Field Championships	Birmingham CrossPlex	11th	Long Jump	6.25 m (20 ft 6 in)
2022	SEC Indoor Track and Field Championships	Texas A&M University	2nd	High Jump	1.84 m (6 ft 0 in)
2022	SEC Indoor Track and Field Championships	Texas A&M University	5th	Long Jump	6.29 m (20 ft 8 in)
Representing Texas A&M Aggies
2021	2021 NCAA Division I Outdoor Track and Field Championships	University of Oregon	3rd	High Jump	1.87 m (6 ft 2 in)
2021	2021 NCAA Division I Outdoor Track and Field Championships	University of Oregon	2nd	Long Jump	6.68 m (21 ft 11 in)
2021	2021 NCAA Division I Outdoor Track and Field Championships	University of Oregon	1st	Heptathlon	6285 points
2021	SEC Outdoor Track and Field Championships	Texas A&M University	2nd	High Jump	1.89 m (6 ft 2 in)
2021	SEC Outdoor Track and Field Championships	Texas A&M University	4th	Long Jump	6.56 m (21 ft 6 in)
2021	SEC Outdoor Track and Field Championships	Texas A&M University	24th	100 m hurdles	DNF
2021	SEC Outdoor Track and Field Championships	Texas A&M University	1st	Heptathlon	6418 points NR
2021	2021 NCAA Division I Indoor Track and Field Championships	University of Arkansas	1st	High Jump	1.90 m (6 ft 3 in)
2021	2021 NCAA Division I Indoor Track and Field Championships	University of Arkansas	3rd	Long Jump	6.68 m (21 ft 11 in) NR
2021	2021 NCAA Division I Indoor Track and Field Championships	University of Arkansas	1st	Pentathlon	4746 points NR
2021	SEC Indoor Track and Field Championships	University of Arkansas	1st	High Jump	1.89 m (6 ft 2 in)
2021	SEC Indoor Track and Field Championships	University of Arkansas	1st	Long Jump	6.62 m (21 ft 9 in) former NR
2021	SEC Indoor Track and Field Championships	University of Arkansas	5th	Pentathlon	3818 points
2020	2020 NCAA Division I Indoor Track and Field Championships	University of New Mexico	All-American	Pentathlon	
2020	2020 NCAA Division I Indoor Track and Field Championships	University of New Mexico	All-American	Long Jump	
2020	2020 NCAA Division I Indoor Track and Field Championships	University of New Mexico	All-American	High Jump	
2020	SEC Indoor Track and Field Championships	Texas A&M University	3rd	High Jump	1.85 m (6 ft 1 in)
2020	SEC Indoor Track and Field Championships	Texas A&M University	4th	Long Jump	6.27 m (20 ft 7 in)
2020	SEC Indoor Track and Field Championships	Texas A&M University	1st	Pentathlon	4391 points
2019	2019 NCAA Division I Outdoor Track and Field Championships	University of Texas at Austin	16th	High Jump	1.75 m (5 ft 9 in)
2019	2019 NCAA Division I Outdoor Track and Field Championships	University of Texas at Austin	2nd	Heptathlon	6049 points
2019	SEC Outdoor Track and Field Championships	Texas A&M University	2nd	High Jump	1.82 m (6 ft 0 in)
2019	SEC Outdoor Track and Field Championships	Texas A&M University	3rd	Long Jump	6.53 m (21 ft 5 in)
2019	SEC Outdoor Track and Field Championships	Texas A&M University	2nd	Heptathlon	5793 points
2018	2018 NCAA Division I Outdoor Track and Field Championships	University of Oregon	9th	Long Jump	6.38 m (20 ft 11 in)
2018	2018 NCAA Division I Outdoor Track and Field Championships	University of Oregon	8th	Heptathlon	5748 points
2018	SEC Outdoor Track and Field Championships	University of Tennessee, Knoxville	3rd	High Jump	1.80 m (5 ft 11 in)
2018	SEC Outdoor Track and Field Championships	University of Tennessee, Knoxville	5th	Long Jump	6.47 m (21 ft 3 in)
2018	SEC Outdoor Track and Field Championships	University of Tennessee, Knoxville	1st	Heptathlon	6074 points
2018	2018 NCAA Division I Indoor Track and Field Championships	Texas A&M University	8th	Pentathlon	4197 points
2018	SEC Indoor Track and Field Championships	Texas A&M University	7th	High Jump	1.80 m (5 ft 11 in)
2018	SEC Indoor Track and Field Championships	Texas A&M University	5th	Pentathlon	4121 points

== Personal life ==
In 2021, she became engaged to engineer Donavan Spotsville.
