= Merle Homeier =

German athlete (born 1999)

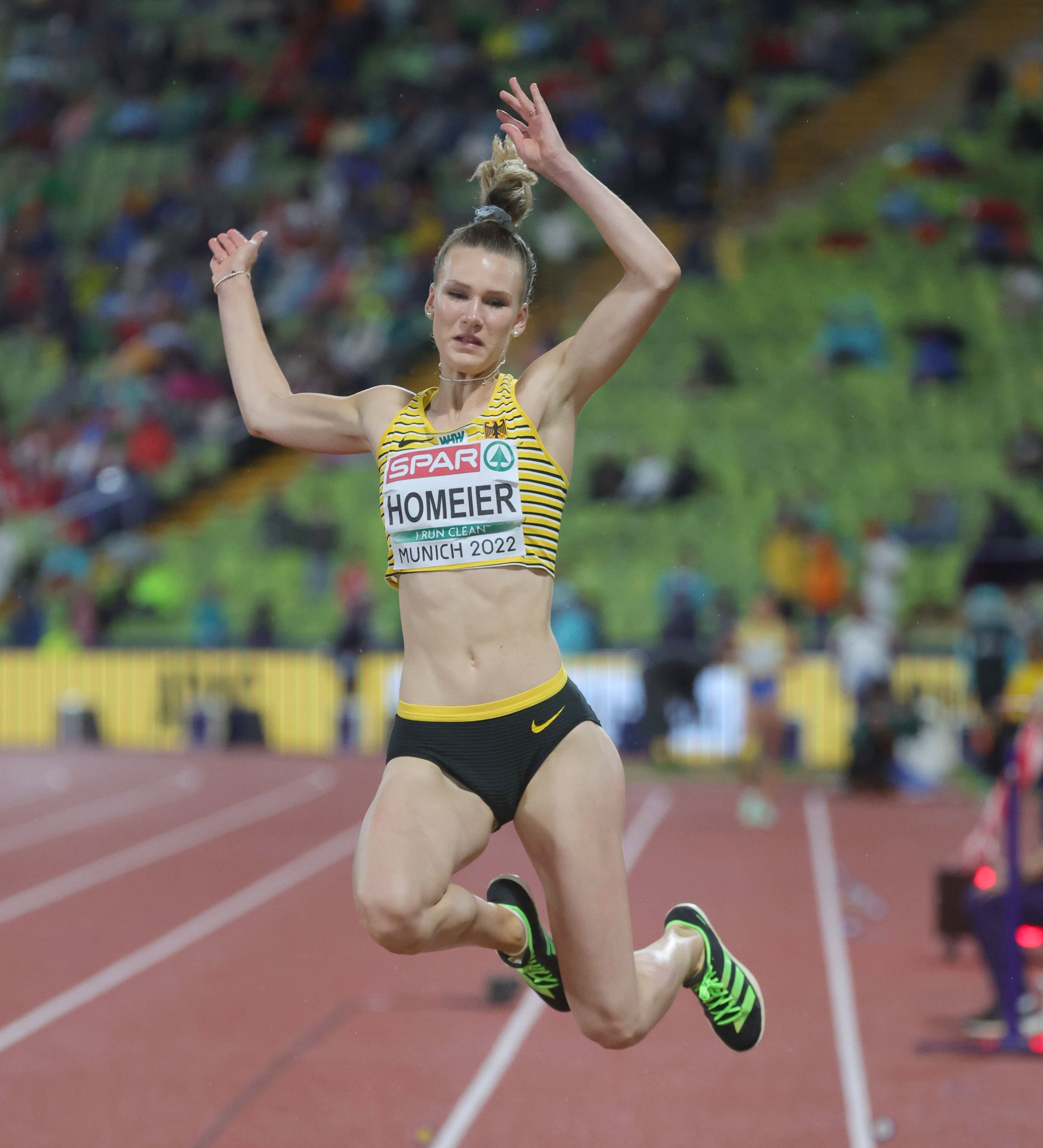
- Homeier in 2022

Personal information
- Born: 27 August 1999 (age 26) Bückeburg

Sport
- Sport: Track and Field
- Event: Long Jump
Medal record
Women's athletics
Representing Germany
European U23 Championships
Silver medal – second place	2021 Tallinn	Long Jump

Merle Homeier (born 27 August 1999) is a German track and field athlete who competes as a long jumper. She competed at the 2022 World Athletics Championships.

== Early life ==
Homeier competed as a member of VfL Bückeburg won German age-group championships in multi-events in 2013 and 2014.

== Career ==
In 2018 she became the German U20 long jump champion indoors and was runner up to Lea-Jasmine Riecke at the U20 German outdoor championships. She competed for LG Göttingen to be coaches under Frank Reinhardt in 2019. That year, she was runner-up in the long jump at the 2019 German Athletics Championships. Homeier also finished second at the 2021 European Athletics U23 Championships jumping a personal best 6.69m to finish behind Hungarian Petra Farkas. In Leipzig, in February 2022, Homeier finished runner up at the German indoor championships to Olympic champion Malaika Mihambo with a jump of 6.66 metres.

In Eugene, Oregon in July 2022, Homeier competed in the 2022 World Athletics Championships but did not finish in the qualifying positions which would have progressed her to the final, in difficult wind conditions her best jump was one of 6.09 metres. In August 2022, Homeier qualified for the final with a 6.49m jump at the 2022 European Championships long jump competition in Munich, and in the final she finished in ninth place overall.

She was announced as joining Hannover 96 in late 2023. She made her debut for Hannover competing indoors in January 2024.

== Personal life ==
She studied at Osnabrück University of Applied Sciences in 2023.
