= 2024 World Athletics Indoor Championships – Women's long jump =

Women's long jump at the 2024 World Athletics Indoor Championships
- Venue: Emirates Arena
- Dates: 3 March 2024
- Competitors: 15 from 12 nations
- Winning distance: 7.07 m

Medalists
gold medal	Tara Davis-Woodhall	United States
silver medal	Monae' Nichols	United States
bronze medal	Fátima Diame	Spain

The women's long jump at the 2024 World Athletics Indoor Championships took place on 3 March 2024 at the Emirates Arena in Glasgow.

== Results ==
The final started at 19:15.

Rank	Athlete	Nationality	#1	#2	#3	#4	#5	#6	Result	Notes
1st place, gold medalist(s)	Tara Davis-Woodhall	United States	6.73	6.79	6.93	7.07	6.88	7.03	7.07	
2nd place, silver medalist(s)	Monae' Nichols	United States	6.75	x	6.83	6.85	6.68	x	6.85	SB
3rd place, bronze medalist(s)	Fátima Diame	Spain	6.47	x	6.40	6.51	6.78	x	6.78	SB
4	Mikaelle Assani	Germany	6.67	6.66	6.68	6.57	6.77	6.44	6.77	
5	Annik Kälin	Switzerland	x	6.62	6.67	6.73	6.75	6.68	6.75	
6	Milica Gardašević	Serbia	6.47	x	6.56	6.74	6.59	x	6.74	SB
7	Larissa Iapichino	Italy	6.51	x	6.65	6.67	6.69	6.44	6.69	
8	Alina Rotaru-Kottmann	Romania	6.46	6.33	x	6.43	x	6.45	6.46	
9	Sumire Hata	Japan	6.43	x	6.39				6.43	SB
10	Tissanna Hickling	Jamaica	6.43	x	6.14				6.43	SB
11	Diana Lesti	Hungary	x	6.35	6.09				6.35	
12	Natalia Linares	Colombia	6.29	6.33	5.82				6.33	SB
13	Petra Bánhidi-Farkas	Hungary	6.30	6.17	6.20				6.30	
14	Eliane Martins	Brazil	6.29	6.00	6.08				6.29	
15	Lissandra Campos	Brazil	x	x	6.15				6.15	
