= Ayaka Kōra =

Japanese long jumper (born 2001)

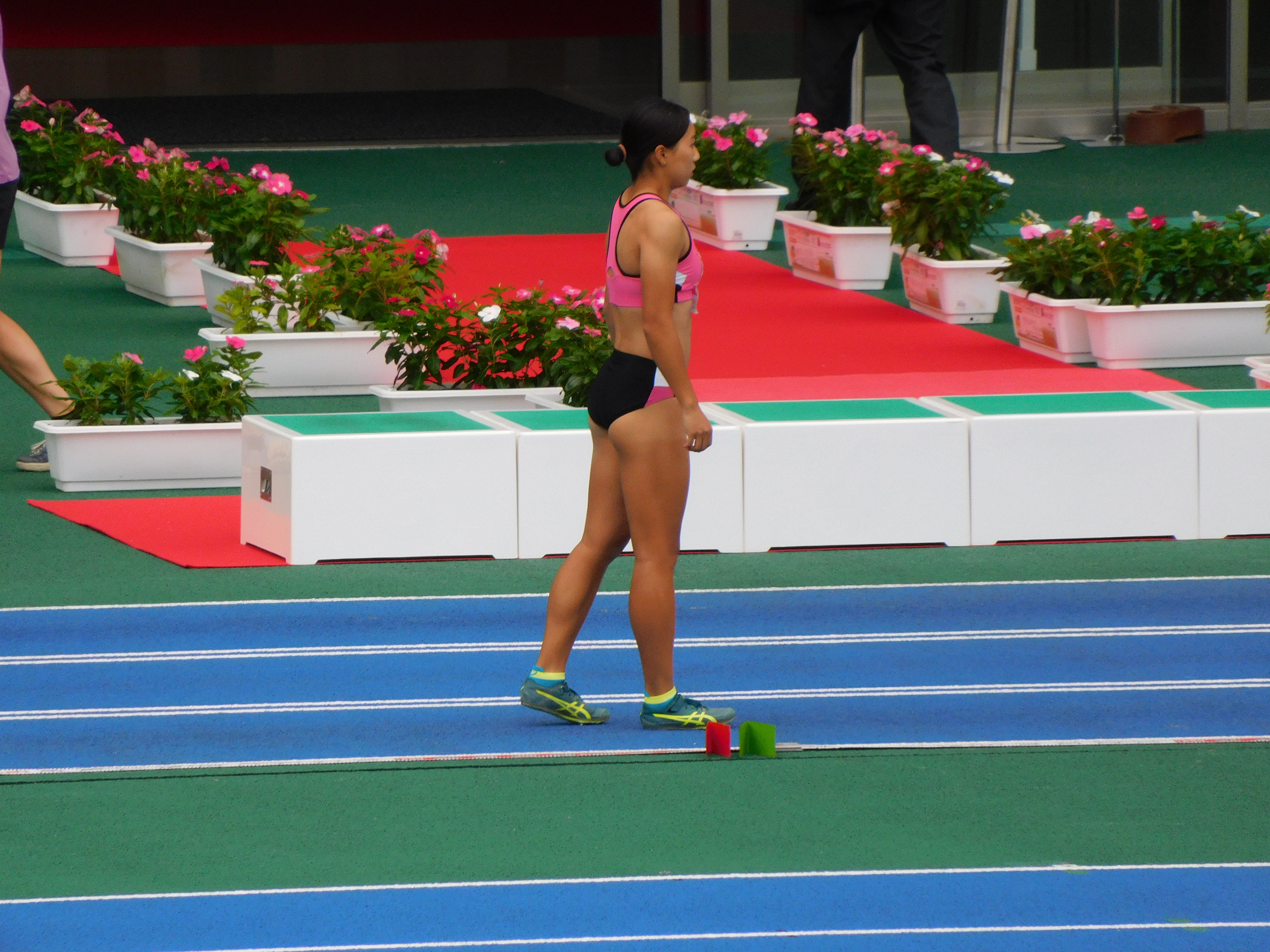

Personal information
- Born: 22 March 2001 (age 25) Nishinomiya, Japan
- Education: University of Tsukuba
- Height: 1.57 m (5 ft 2 in)
- Weight: 41 kg (90 lb)

Sport
- Sport: Athletics
- Event: Long jump
Medal record
Women's athletics
Representing Japan
Asian Championships
Silver medal – second place	2019 Doha	long jump

Ayaka Kōra (高良彩花, Kōra Ayaka; born 22 March 2001) is a Japanese athlete specialising in the long jump. She won a silver medal at the 2018 IAAF World U20 Championships. She later also won a silver at the 2019 Asian Championships.

Her personal bests in the event are 6.44 metres outdoors (+0.8 m/s, Gifu 2018) and 6.05 metres indoors (Tallinn 2019).

== International competitions ==
Representing Japan
Year	Competition	Venue	Position	Event	Notes
2018	Asian Junior Championships	Gifu, Japan	1st	Long jump	6.44 m
2018	World U20 Championships	Tampere, Finland	2nd	Long jump	6.37 m
2019	Asian Championships	Doha, Qatar	2nd	Long jump	6.16 m
2019	Universiade	Naples, Italy	12th	Long jump	6.10 m
2019	Universiade	Naples, Italy	6th (h)	4 × 100 m relay	45.08 s
2023	Asian Indoor Championships	Astana, Kazakhstan	7th	Long jump	6.14 m
2023	Asian Championships	Bangkok, Thailand	5th	Long jump	6.32 m
2026	Asian Indoor Championships	Tianjin, China	4th	Long jump	6.16 m
