= 2019 Asian Athletics Championships – Women's long jump =

Women's long jump at the 2019 Asian Athletics Championships
- Venue: Khalifa International Stadium
- Location: Doha, Qatar
- Dates: 22 April
- Competitors: 11 from 7 nations
- Winning distance: 6.38 m

Medalists
gold medal	Lu Minjia	China
silver medal	Ayaka Kora	Japan
bronze medal	Yue Ya Xin	Hong Kong

The women's long jump at the 2019 Asian Athletics Championships was held on 22 April.

== Records ==
Records before the 2019 Asian Athletics Championships
Record	Athlete (nation)	Distance (m)	Location	Date
World record	Galina Chistyakova (URS)	7.52	Leningrad, Soviet Union	11 June 1988
Asian record	Yao Weili (CHN)	7.01	Jinan, China	4 June 1993
Championship record	Guan Yingnan (CHN)	6.83	Fukuoka, Japan	19 July 1998
World leading	Malaika Mihambo (GER)	6.99	Berlin, Germany	1 February 2019
Asian leading	No distances recorded			

== Results ==
Rank	Name	Nationality	#1	#2	#3	#4	#5	#6	Result	Notes
1st place, gold medalist(s)	Lu Minjia	China	6.36	x	6.38	6.27w	x	6.27	6.38	SB
2nd place, silver medalist(s)	Ayaka Kora	Japan	5.68	5.93	6.01	5.80	6.16	6.04	6.16	
3rd place, bronze medalist(s)	Yue Ya Xin	Hong Kong	6.14	x	6.15	5.96	x	6.06	6.15	
4	Chen Shuiqing	China	x	6.05	x	2.91	5.71	6.15	6.15	
5	Hitomi Nakano	Japan	6.08	6.09	6.00	x	x	6.10	6.10	
6	Roksana Khudoyarova	Uzbekistan	x	6.00	x	5.56	6.08	5.55	6.08	PB
7	Alina Yablokova	Uzbekistan	5.69	5.81	6.05	5.87	5.82	5.65	6.05	PB
8	Kim Min-ji	South Korea	5.67	5.78	6.03	5.96	6.02	5.94w	6.03	SB
9	Chan Ka Sin	Hong Kong	5.63	x	5.40				5.63	
10	Sou Iman	Macau	5.36w	5.36	x				5.36	SB
11	Bashir Al-Manwari	Qatar	x	4.06	–				4.06	SB
