= Abduraqhman Karriem =

South African sprinter

Personal information
- Born: 25 September 2004 (age 21)

Sport
- Sport: Athletics
- Event: Sprint

Achievements and titles
- Personal best(s): 100m: 10.06 (2025); 200m: 20.15 (2025)

Abduraqhman Karriem (born 25 September 2004) is a South African sprinter.

== Early life ==
From Ottery, Cape Town, he is one of five siblings. His mother Ilhaam was herself a sprinter and he received coaching from his father Abeed. His younger sister, Naboeweyah also competes as a sprinter and won the Western Province under-20 club championship. He attended Fairview Primary School in Grassy Park. He was Western Province junior champion for three consecutive years, as well as winning two senior titles whilst still a junior.

== Career ==
He is a member of Western Province Athletics club. He won the 100 metres at the ASA U20 Track and Field Championships in Pietermaritzburg in March 2023, running 10.51 seconds.

He finished third at the South African Athletics Championships in April 2025 in the 200 metres running a personal best 20.15 seconds. In April 2025, he lowered his personal best to 10.07 seconds for the 100 metres in the B race at the Botswana Golden Grand Prix meeting in Gaborone.

He ran a personal best 10.06 seconds for the 100 metres in Italy in June 2025, finishing behind Cameroonian Emmanuel Eseme on the day (10.05) by one-thousandth of a second. Later that month, he ran 20.52 seconds for the 200 metres to place fifth overall at the 2025 BAUHAUS-galan event in Stockholm, part of the 2025 Diamond League, on his Diamond League debut.

In March 2026, he won the U23 title over 100 m at the ASA age-group championships.
