= 2021 European Athletics U23 Championships – Women's long jump =

Athletic Championship

Women's long jump at the 2021 European Athletics U23 Championships
- Venue: Kadriorg Stadium, Tallinn
- Dates: 10–11 July
- Competitors: 28 from 22 nations
- Winning distance: 6.73

Medalists
gold medal	Petra Farkas	Hungary
silver medal	Merle Homeier	Germany
bronze medal	Lucy Hadaway	Great Britain

The women's long jump event at the 2021 European Athletics U23 Championships was held in Tallinn, Estonia, at Kadriorg Stadium on 10 and 11 July.

== Records ==
Prior to the competition, the records were as follows:

European U23 record	Heike Drechsler (GDR)	7.45	Dresden, East Germany	3 July 1986
Championship U23 record	Darya Klishina (RUS)	7.05	Ostrava, Czech Republic	17 July 2011

== Results ==
=== Qualification ===
Qualification rule: 6.45 (Q) or the 12 best results (q) qualified for the final.

Rank	Group	Name	Nationality	#1	#2	#3	Results	Notes
1	A	Maelly Dalmat	France	x	6.49		6.49	Q
2	A	Lucy Hadaway	Great Britain	6.27	x	6.48	6.48	Q
3	B	Merle Homeier	Germany	6.45			6.45	Q
4	B	Pauline Hondema	Netherlands	x	6.22	6.40	6.40	q
5	A	Lea-Sophie Klik	Germany	6.26	6.25	6.36	6.36	q
6	A	Klara Barnjak	Croatia	x	6.34	6.13	6.34	q, PB
7	B	Ingeborg Grünwald	Austria	6.05	x	6.34	6.34	q
8	B	Spyridoula Karydi	Greece	6.34	x	5.83	6.34	q
9	A	Petra Farkas	Hungary	6.28	6.17	6.31	6.31	q
10	B	Lishanna Ilves	Estonia	6.31	–	x	6.31	q
11	A	Ruby Millet	Ireland	x	6.18	6.25	6.25	q
12	A	Veronica Crida	Italy	5.90	6.08	6.22	6.22	q
13	A	Laila Lacuey	Spain	6.05	x	6.22	6.22	
14	B	Gaëlle Maonzambi	Switzerland	5.95	x	6.21	6.21	
15	A	Léonie Cambours	France	x	6.07	x	6.07	
16	B	Klaudia Endrész	Hungary	x	5.98	6.05	6.05	
17	B	Vasiliki Chaitidou	Greece	6.03	6.03	5.89	6.03	
18	A	Thale Leirfall	Norway	x	5.93	6.00	6.00	
19	B	Tiphaine Mauchant	France	6.00	x	5.92	6.00	
20	B	Sara Lukić	Serbia	5.99	5.90	5.75	5.99	
21	A	Adéla Záhorová	Czech Republic	5.94	x	x	5.94	
22	B	Palina Zlotnikava	Belarus	x	x	5.88	5.88	
23	A	Maria Stefanopoulou	Greece	4.88	5.82	x	5.82	
24	B	Maja Bedrač	Slovenia	5.77	x	x	5.77	
25	B	Luka Garšvaitė	Lithuania	x	x	5.26	5.26	
26	A	Yevheniya Horbatyuk	Ukraine	2.52	3.62	2.66	3.62	
	B	Claire Azzopardi	Malta	x	x	x	NM	
	A	Kitija Paula Melnbārde	Latvia	x	x	x	NM	
	A	Tuğba Danışmaz	Turkey	DNS				
	B	Linda Suchá	Czech Republic	DNS				
	B	Veronica Zanon	Italy	DNS				

=== Final ===
Rank	Name	Nationality	#1	#2	#3	#4	#5	#6	Result	Notes
1st place, gold medalist(s)	Petra Farkas	Hungary	6.52	6.45	6.66	6.73	6.62	6.57	6.73	EU23L
2nd place, silver medalist(s)	Merle Homeier	Germany	6.69	6.68	–	6.64	6.58	x	6.69	PB
3rd place, bronze medalist(s)	Lucy Hadaway	Great Britain	6.53	x	6.55	6.63	x	6.63	6.63	PB
4	Maelly Dalmat	France	6.48	x	3.55	6.61	x	6.33	6.61	PB
5	Lea-Sophie Klik	Germany	6.40	6.36	6.56	x	6.27	5.06	6.56	
6	Lishanna Ilves	Estonia	4.83	6.42	x	6.31	x	x	6.42	
7	Ingeborg Grünwald	Austria	6.37	6.17	x	x	6.38	6.33	6.38	
8	Klara Barnjak	Croatia	6.09	6.27	6.16	4.52	6.11	x	6.27	
9	Spyridoula Karydi	Greece	6.25	5.99	6.05				6.25	
10	Pauline Hondema	Netherlands	6.21	x	x				6.21	
11	Veronica Crida	Italy	x	x	5.98				5.98	
12	Ruby Millet	Ireland	5.84	3.63	5.57				5.84	
