= Athletics at the 2024 Summer Olympics – Women's long jump =

Women's long jump at the Games of the XXXIII Olympiad
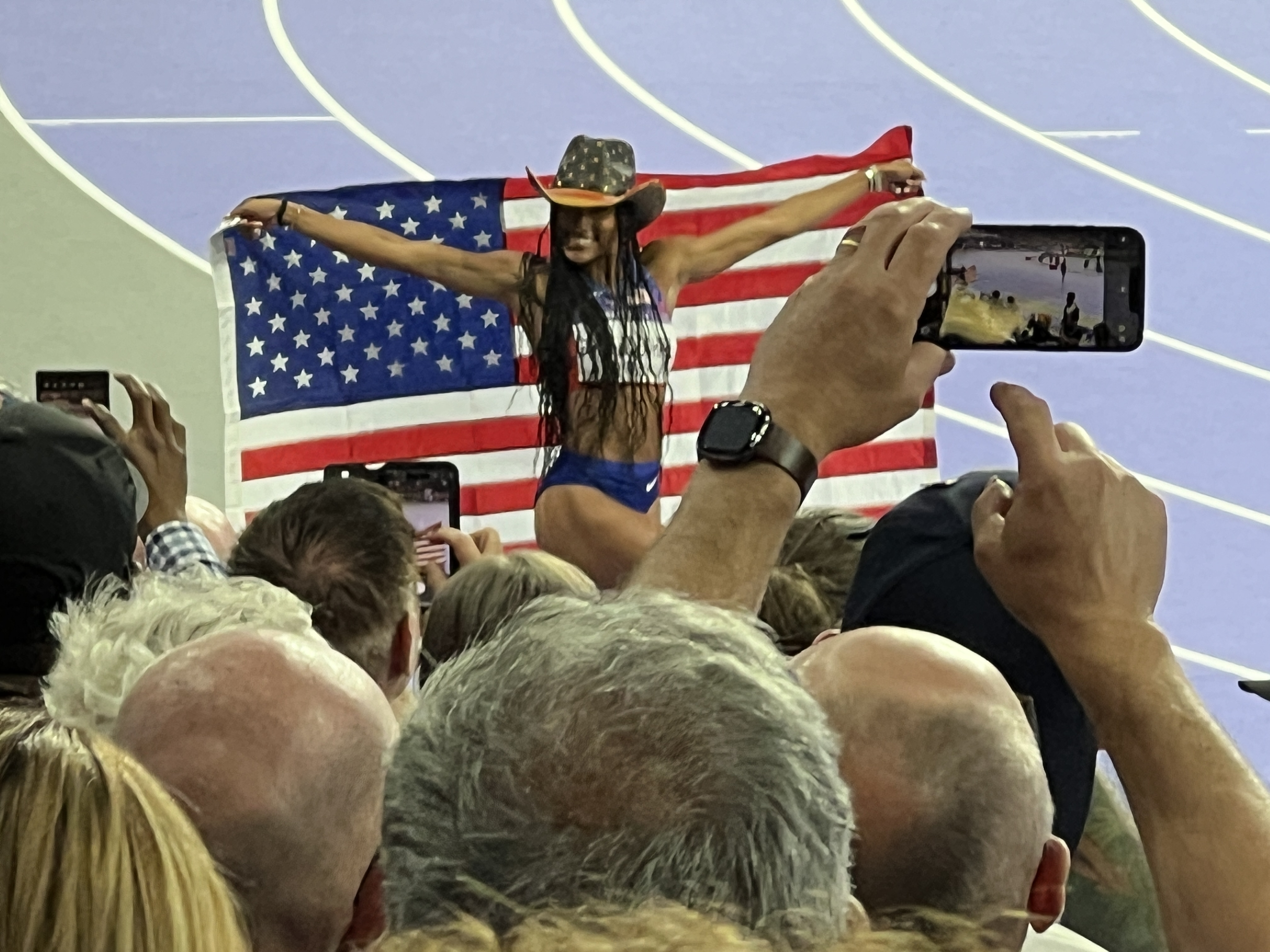
- Tara Davis-Woodhall of the United States celebrates her victory in the women's long jump at the Paris 2024 Summer Olympics.
- Venue: Stade de France, Paris, France
- Date: 6 August 2024 (qualification) 8 August 2024 (final)
- Winning distance: 7.10 m

Medalists
1st place, gold medalist(s)		Tara Davis-Woodhall	United States
2nd place, silver medalist(s)		Malaika Mihambo	Germany
3rd place, bronze medalist(s)		Jasmine Moore	United States

The women's long jump at the 2024 Summer Olympics was held in Paris, France, on 6 and 8 August 2024. This was the 20th time that the event was contested at the Summer Olympics.

== Summary ==
The returning gold medalist, 2019 and 2022 world champion Malaika Mihambo, returned for her third Olympics after being the bridesmaid (4th place) in Rio. She was also the 2024 world leader. Returning bronze medalist Ese Brume also took bronze in 2019 and silver in 2022. 2022 World Championship bronze medalist Leticia Oro Melo did not compete. The 2023 World Championships revealed a new crop of medalists; gold was Ivana Španović, silver was Tara Davis-Woodhall and bronze was Alina Rotaru-Kottmann. Jasmine Moore was doing the rare jump double, having already taken bronze in the triple jump.

Mihambo set off to defend her title with a 6.77 m from almost the back of the board. Iapichino did her one better jumping 6.78 m from the middle of the board. Then Davis-Woodhall advanced the lead to 6.93 m. Near the end of the round, Moore hit her marks so perfectly the officials had to review it, but she was ruled fair for a 6.96 m. In the second round, Mihambo improved slightly to 6.81 m, only to see Larissa Iapichino push her out of third place with a 6.87 m moments later. Two more jumpers and Davis-Woodhall grabbed the lead with 7.05 m. Near the beginning of the third round, Mihambo took back third with 6.95 m. In the fourth round, Mihambo got off a big jump but also had a big foul on the takeoff. After Moore did not improve, Davis-Woodhall got off the winner 7.10 m (23 ft 3 1/2 in). In the fifth round, Mihambo moved her marks back and took off from the middle of the board. Her 6.98m could have challenged Davis-Woodhall if it had been from the line but was only good enough to move into second place. When Mihambo failed to improve on her final attempt, Davis-Woodhall knew she had the gold. She took a lackluster final attempt, stood up to wave to the crowd then fell back into the pit to do a snow angel in the sand.

== Background ==
The women's long jump has been present on the Olympic athletics programme since 1948.

Global records before the 2024 Summer Olympics
Record	Athlete (Nation)	Distance (m)	Location	Date
World record	Galina Chistyakova (URS)	7.52	Leningrad, Soviet Union	11 June 1988
Olympic record	Jackie Joyner-Kersee (USA)	7.40	Seoul, South Korea	29 September 1988
World leading	Malaika Mihambo (GER)	7.22	Rome, Italy	12 June 2024

Area records before the 2024 Summer Olympics
Area Record	Athlete (Nation)	Distance (m)
Africa (records)	Ese Brume (NGR)	7.17
Asia (records)	Yao Weili (CHN)	7.01
Europe (records)	Galina Chistyakova (URS)	7.52 WR
North, Central America and Caribbean (records)	Jackie Joyner-Kersee (USA)	7.49
Oceania (records)	Brooke Buschkuehl (AUS)	7.13
South America (records)	Maurren Maggi (BRA)	7.26

== Qualification ==
For the women's long jump event, the qualification period was between 1 July 2023 and 30 June 2024. 32 athletes were able to qualify for the event, with a maximum of three athletes per nation, by jumping the entry standard of 6.86 m or further or by their World Athletics Ranking for this event.

== Results ==
=== Qualification ===
The qualification was held on 6 August, starting at 11:15 (UTC+2) in the morning. 32 athletes qualified for the first round by qualification time or world ranking. All athletes meeting the qualification standard of 6.75 (Q) or at least 12 best performers (q) advance to the final

Rank	Group	Athlete	Nation	1	2	3	Distance	Notes
1	A	Tara Davis-Woodhall	United States	6.64	6.90		6.90	Q
2	B	Larissa Iapichino	Italy	6.60	6.87		6.87	Q
3	B	Malaika Mihambo	Germany	x	x	6.86	6.86	Q
4	A	Ese Brume	Nigeria	6.44	6.40	6.76	6.76	Q
5	A	Ruth Usoro	Nigeria	x	6.68	6.65	6.68	q
6	A	Jasmine Moore	United States	6.35	6.66	x	6.66	q
7	B	Prestina Ochonogor	Nigeria	6.27	6.65	6.29	6.65	q
8	B	Monae' Nichols	United States	6.43	6.52	6.64	6.64	q
9	A	Alina Rotaru-Kottmann	Romania	6.45	6.46	6.63	6.63	q
10	B	Ackelia Smith	Jamaica	6.51	6.59	6.58	6.59	q
11	B	Marthe Koala	Burkina Faso	6.36	6.59	6.57	6.59	q
12	B	Hilary Kpatcha	France	6.18	6.20	6.59	6.59	q
13	A	Xiong Shiqi	China	6.58	6.56	6.52	6.58	
14	A	Pauline Hondema	Netherlands	4.72	6.21	6.55	6.55	
15	B	Fátima Diame	Spain	6.37	6.52	x	6.52	
16	B	Ivana Španović	Serbia	x	6.51	6.31	6.51	
17	A	Chanice Porter	Jamaica	6.48	6.21	x	6.48	
18	A	Milica Gardašević	Serbia	6.48	x	x	6.48	
19	B	Plamena Mitkova	Bulgaria	6.45	6.42	6.33	6.45	
20	A	Laura Raquel Müller	Germany	6.40	6.13	6.38	6.40	
21	B	Petra Farkas	Hungary	6.40	6.33	6.22	6.40	
22	A	Natalia Linares	Colombia	x	6.40	6.04	6.40	
23	A	Eliane Martins	Brazil	6.36	x	x	6.36	
24	A	Agate de Sousa	Portugal	x	6.34	6.27	6.34	
25	B	Brooke Buschkuehl	Australia	6.29	6.10	6.31	6.31	
26	B	Sumire Hata	Japan	6.21	x	6.31	6.31	
27	A	Nikola Horowska	Poland	x	6.31	x	6.31	
28	B	Mikaelle Assani	Germany	5.64	6.13	6.24	6.24	
29	A	Esraa Owis	Egypt	5.93	6.11	6.20	6.20	
30	A	Tessy Ebosele	Spain	6.02	x	6.09	6.09	
31	B	Lissandra Campos	Brazil	5.90	6.02	x	6.02	

=== Final ===
The final occurred on 8 August, starting at 20:00 (UTC+2) in the evening.

Rank	Athlete	Nation	1	2	3	4	5	6	Distance	Notes
1st place, gold medalist(s)	Tara Davis-Woodhall	United States	6.93	7.05	6.95	7.10	6.61	6.68	7.10	
2nd place, silver medalist(s)	Malaika Mihambo	Germany	6.77	6.81	6.95	x	6.98	x	6.98	
3rd place, bronze medalist(s)	Jasmine Moore	United States	6.96	6.92	6.62	6.75	6.88	6.88	6.96	
4	Larissa Iapichino	Italy	6.78	6.87	x	6.83	6.78	6.85	6.87	
5	Ese Brume	Nigeria	x	6.59	6.63	6.70	6.51	6.70	6.70	
6	Monae' Nichols	United States	6.64	x	6.36	6.63	6.67	6.66	6.67	
7	Alina Rotaru-Kottmann	Romania	6.46	6.46	6.65	6.55	6.67	6.50	6.67	
8	Ackelia Smith	Jamaica	6.66	6.52	x	5.86	6.40	6.42	6.66	
9	Marthe Koala	Burkina Faso	6.61	6.51	6.46	Did not advance			6.61	
10	Ruth Usoro	Nigeria	6.58	x	5.80	Did not advance			6.58	
11	Hilary Kpatcha	France	6.56	5.54	5.78	Did not advance			6.56	
12	Prestina Ochonogor	Nigeria	6.07	6.24	6.24	Did not advance			6.24	
