= Petra Farkas =

Hungarian long jumper

Personal information
- Full name: Petra Beáta Farkas
- Born: 30 April 1999 (age 27)

Sport
- Sport: Athletics
- Event: Long jump
- Club: Budapest Honvéd
- Coached by: László Szenczi

Petra Beáta Farkas (born 30 April 1999) is a Hungarian athlete specialising in the long jump. She represented her country at the 2019 World Championships in Doha without reaching the final. Earlier that year she won a silver medal at the European U23 Championships in Gävle.

Her personal bests in the event are 6.72 metres outdoors (+1.9 m/s, Budapest 2019) and 6.41 metres indoors (Budapest 2018).

== International competitions ==
Year	Competition	Venue	Position	Event	Notes
Representing Hungary
2016	European Youth Championships	Tbilisi, Georgia	4th	Long jump	6.08 m
2017	European U20 Championships	Grosseto, Italy	4th	Long jump	6.28 m
2018	World U20 Championships	Tampere, Finland	5th	Long jump	6.16 m
2019	European U23 Championships	Gävle, Sweden	2nd	Long jump	6.55 m
2019	World Championships	Doha, Qatar	23rd (q)	Long jump	6.44 m
2021	European U23 Championships	Tallinn, Estonia	1st	Long jump	6.73 m
2024	Olympic Games	Paris, France	21st (q)	Long jump	6.40 m
