= Lea-Jasmin Riecke =

German athlete

Personal information
- Nationality: German
- Born: 25 April 2000 (age 26)

Sport
- Sport: Track and Field
- Event: long jump
Medal record
IAAF World U20 Championships
Gold medal – first place	2018 Tampere	Long jump

Lea-Jasmin Riecke (born 25 April 2000) is a German athlete who won the 2018 IAAF World U20 Championships in the long jump.

== Career ==
Lea-Jasmin Riecke won the silver medal at the German Youth All-Around Championships in Lage in 2015. She won gold in the 4 × 200 m relay at the German Youth Indoor Championships in Dortmund in 2016 and took part in the 2016 European Youth Championships in Tbilisi.

In 2017 she became German U18 long jump champion at the German Youth Championships in Ulm with a distance of 6.19m. She then won the gold medal in the long jump at the 2018 IAAF World U20 Championships in Tampere with a personal best 6.51m. At the German Youth Championships in 2018 in Rostock she gained gold medals in the long jump with 6.34m jump and in the 4 × 100 m relay from. That year the German Sports Foundation nominated for the Junior Sportswoman of the Year.

At the German Youth Championships 2019 in Ulm, she won the gold medal with 6.43m jump. Then she won the bronze medal at the German Championships in Berlin.

After missing huge chunks of competition time in 2021 Riecke claimed third place at the German indoor championships long jump competition in Leipzig in February 2022, jumping 6.26m to finish behind Merle Homeier and long jump Olympic champion Malaika Mihambo.

She set a new personal best distance of 6.60 metres in Weinheim in May 2023. She competed at the World University Games in Chengdu, in August 2023, qualifying for the final and placing seventh overall with a distance of 6.22 metres.

== Personal life ==
She is from Magdeburg. She is a member of Mitteldeutscher Sportclub. She attended Magdeburg-Stendal University of Applied Sciences.
