= Monae' Nichols =

American athlete (born 1998)

Monae' Nichols OLY
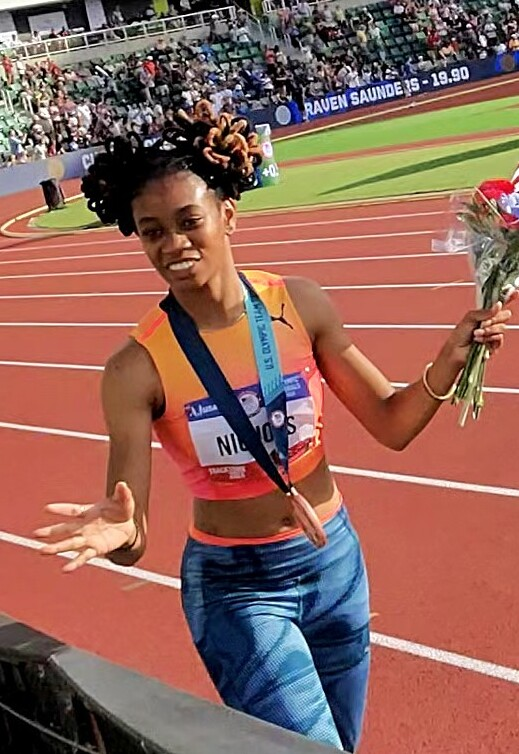
- Nichols in 2024

Personal information
- Full name: Monae' Nichols
- Born: November 24, 1998 (age 27) Lakeland, Florida, U.S.
- Home town: Winter Haven, Florida, U.S.
- Education: Texas Tech University '22; Bethune–Cookman University '20 Psychology Mental Health Counseling/Counselor
- Agent: Mario Bassani

Sport
- Sport: Athletics
- Event: Long jump

Achievements and titles
- Personal bests: Long jump: 6.97m (Lubbock, 2022)
Medal record
Women's athletics
Representing United States
World Indoor Championships
Silver medal – second place	2024 Glasgow	Long jump
Diamond League
First place	2026 Brussels	Long jump

Monae' Nichols OLY (born November 24, 1998) is an American track and field athlete who competes in the long jump. She was the silver medalist at the 2024 World Athletics Indoor Championships and won the 2026 Diamond League Final.

== Early life ==
Nichols is from Winter Haven, Florida and ran track at Auburndale High School. She attended Bethune–Cookman University in her home state before transferring to Texas Tech University.

== NCAA ==
She was runner-up to Jasmine Moore at the 2022 NCAA Division I Indoor Track and Field Championships in March 2022, despite both athletes jumping the same distance of 6.57m, Moore was awarded first place for having the furthest second jump. In May 2022, she jumped a personal best distance of 6.97m in Lubbock. Later that summer she finished fourth in the 2022 NCAA Outdoor Championships.

== Professional ==
Nichols finished seventh at the 2023 US National Outdoor Championships with a jump of 6.49 meters.

In February 2024, she finished third at the 2024 USA Indoor Track and Field Championships with a 6.73m distance in the long jump. She was subsequently selected for the 2024 World Athletics Indoor Championships in Glasgow where she won a silver medal in the long jump event with a distance of 6.85m. In June 2024, competing at the 2024 United States Olympic trials in Eugene, Oregon she finished third in the long jump with a jump of 6.86 meters. She subsequently placed sixth overall in the long jump at the 2024 Paris Olympics.

Nichols won the 2025 USA Indoor Track and Field Championships with a jump of 6.73 metres. She was selected for the 2025 World Athletics Indoor Championships in Nanjing in March 2025, placing eighth overall with a best jump of 6.49 metres.

She jumped 6.58 metres to place seventh overall in the long jump at the 2025 USA Outdoor Track and Field Championships. She placed sixth a jump of 6.45 metres at the Diamond League Final in Zurich on 28 August.

On 24 January 2026, Nichols jumped 6.64m to win the Indoor Grand Prix, a World Athletics Indoor Tour Gold meet in Boston. In February 2026, she was runner-up to Jasmine Moore in the long jump at the 2026 USA Indoor Track and Field Championships with a best jump of 6.72 metres. She placed eighth representing the United States at the 2026 World Athletics Indoor Championships in Toruń, Poland.

In May, Nichols won the women’s long jump with 6.89 metres at the 2026 Shanghai Diamond League. Later that month, she had another international at the JBL Jump Fest in Košice, Slovakia, winning with 6.69 metres before setting a meeting record 6.88 metres to win at the Paavo Nurmi Games in Finland on 3 June. On 4 July, Nichols placed third at the 2026 Prefontaine Classic with a wind-assisted jump of 7.05 metres (+3.0). On 26 July, Nichols placed second in the long jump at the 2026 USA Outdoor Track and Field Championships in New York. With a best jump of 6.92 metres, she finished behind Alyssa Jones and ahead of defending champion Tara Davis-Woodhall. It was the first long jump defeat for Davis-Woodall since the 2023 World Championships. In August, she placed third in the Diamond League at the 2026 Kamila Skolimowska Memorial in Silesia, Poland, with 6.95 metres. At the 2026 Diamond League Final in Brussels on 5 September, she won the title with a winning jump of 6.91m to finish ahead of Larissa Iapichino. On 11 September, she placed seventh in the long jump at the inaugural 2026 World Athletics Ultimate Championship in Budapest. On 18 September, she placed third in the long jump at Athlos in London.
