= Jasmine Moore =

American athlete (born 2001)

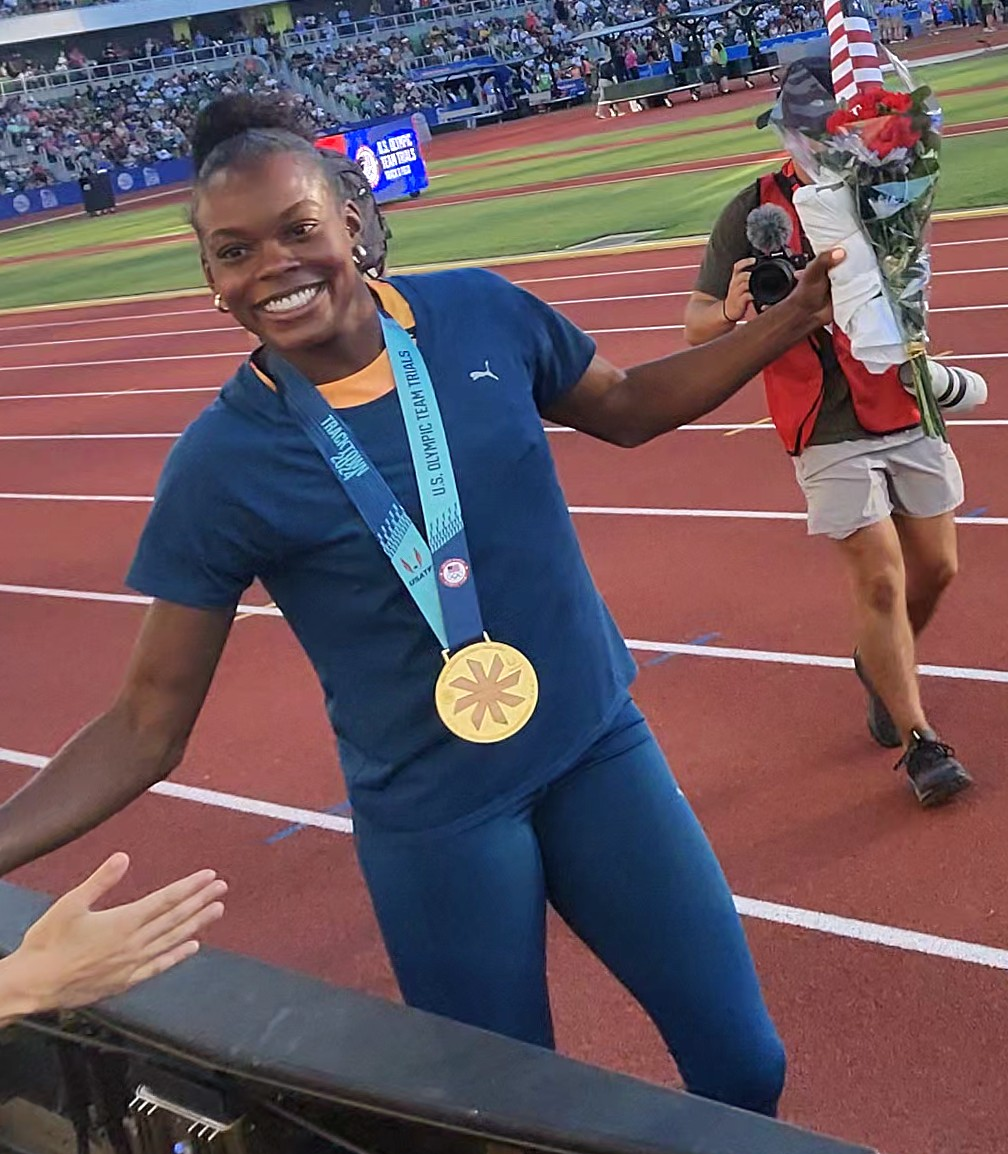
- Moore at the 2024 United States Olympic trials

Personal information
- Born: May 1, 2001 (age 25)
- Home town: Grand Prairie, Texas, U.S.
- Height: 5 ft 8 in (173 cm)

Sport
- Country: United States
- Events: Long jump, triple jump
- College team: Georgia Bulldogs; Florida Gators
- Team: Puma
- Turned pro: 2023
- Coached by: Petros Kyprianou '19 - '21; Nic Petersen '21 - Present

Achievements and titles
- Personal bests: Triple jump: 15.12 m (49 ft 7 in); Long jump: 7.03 m (23 ft 1 in)
Medal record
Women's athletics
Representing the United States
Olympic Games
Bronze medal – third place	2024 Paris	Long jump
Bronze medal – third place	2024 Paris	Triple jump
Pan American U20 Athletics Championships
Bronze medal – third place	2017 Peru	Triple Jump

Jasmine Moore (born May 1, 2001) is an American athlete. She won the bronze medal at the 2024 Summer Olympics in both the long jump and the triple jump event. In 2022, she became the first American woman to qualify for the World Athletics Championships in both the long jump and the triple jump.

== Biography ==
From Grand Prairie, Texas and a student at the University of Georgia, she said she chose Georgia in order to train with Petros Kyprianou, and that she was inspired by the success of Keturah Orji. Moore was named the 2019 Gatorade Girls Track & Field Athlete of the Year.

Moore won the triple jump at the 2021 SEC Outdoor Track and Field Championships with a personal-best and wind-legal jump of 14.39 m (47 ft 3 in), giving her the Olympic standard for the delayed 2020 Tokyo Olympics, and in the top ten in the world for the year. Also, at the same event she came third in the long jump with a distance of 6.64 m (21 ft 9 in).

In June 2021, she won bronze in the long jump at the NCAA Championships with a jump of 6.65 m (21 ft 10 in). At the same event she won silver in the triple jump with a leap of 14.13 m (46 ft 4 in). She recorded a new long jump personal best of 6.83 m (22 ft 5 in) in Athens, Georgia on April 9, 2021, the distance hit the qualifying standard for the Olympic Games and was the sixth highest in the world for the year, and in the top 10 collegiate distances of all time. At the US Olympic trials she finished third in the triple jump to clinch her first Olympic place at the 2020 Summer Games.

In 2023, Moore was chosen as the Honda Sports Award winner in the sport of track and field following her seventh career NCAA individual title, setting an NCAA record in the triple jump of 15.12 m (49 ft 7 in). On July 3, Moore announced she would forego her remaining collegiate eligibility and that she had signed with Puma. She was selected for the 2023 World Athletics Championships in Budapest in August, where she qualified fifth and finished tenth overall.

She competed at the 2024 World Athletics Indoor Championships in Glasgow where she came fifth with a distance of 14.15m. In June 2024, she won the triple jump at the United States Olympic trials in Eugene, Oregon. She later finished second in the long jump at the trials with a jump of 6.98 metres. In doing so, she became the first American woman to be selected for the same Olympics at both events. At the Olympics in Paris, Moore won the bronze medal in the triple jump with a jump of 14.67 m (48 ft 2 in), becoming the first American women to win an Olympic medal in the triple jump. She went onto win her second bronze of the Games in the long jump, recording a best jump of 6.96 m (22 ft 10 in).

She won the triple jump title with 14.68 metres, and jumped 6.82 metres to place fifth overall in the long jump at the 2025 USA Outdoor Track and Field Championships. She recorded her first ever Diamond League win in Silesia, jumping a meeting record of 6.85 m (22 ft 6 in) to win the long jump. She then placed third in the triple jump at the 2025 Memorial Van Damme in the Diamond League, in Brussels, Belgium. She finished sixth in the triple jump at the Diamond League Final in Zurich on 28 August. In September 2025, she competed in the triple jump at the 2025 World Championships in Tokyo, Japan, qualifying for the final and placing seventh overall.

In February 2026, Moore won the long jump at the 2026 USA Indoor Track and Field Championships with a best jump of 6.86 metres. The following day, she also won the triple jump title at the championships with a best jump of 13.89 metres. She was selected to represent the United States in both disciplines at the 2026 World Athletics Indoor Championships in Toruń, Poland, placing seventh overall in both events.

== Results ==
=== International ===
Moore qualified for four Team USA Track and Field championships.

Year	Competition	Venue	Position	Event	Notes
Representing United States
2024	Olympic Games	Paris, France	3rd	Triple jump	14.67 m (48 ft 2 in)
2024	Olympic Games	Paris, France	3rd	Long jump	6.96 m (22 ft 10 in)
2022	World Athletics Championships	Eugene, Oregon	13th	Triple jump	14.24 m (46 ft 9 in)
2022	World Athletics Championships	Eugene, Oregon	13th	Long jump	6.60 m (21 ft 8 in)
2021	Tokyo Olympics	Tokyo, Japan	23rd	Triple jump	13.76 m (45 ft 2 in)
2018	2018 IAAF World U20 Championships	Tampere, Finland	10th	Long Jump	5.99 m (19 ft 8 in)
2018	2018 IAAF World U20 Championships	Tampere, Finland	10th	Triple Jump	13.09 m (42 ft 11 in)
2017	Pan American U20 Athletics Championships	Trujillo, Peru	3rd	Triple jump	13.25 m (43 ft 6 in)
Representing Florida Gators women's track and field
2022	USA Outdoor Track and Field Championships	Eugene, Oregon	3rd	Triple jump	14.15 m (46 ft 5 in)
2022	USA Outdoor Track and Field Championships	Eugene, Oregon	2nd	Long jump	6.80 m (22 ft 4 in)
Representing Georgia Lady Bulldogs track and field
2021	US Olympic trials	Eugene, Oregon	3rd	Triple jump	14.15 m (46 ft 5 in)
Representing North Texas Cheetahs Track Club
2018	USATF U20 Outdoor Championships	Bloomington, Indiana	1st	Triple jump	13.21 m (43 ft 4 in)
2018	USATF U20 Outdoor Championships	Bloomington, Indiana	2nd	Long jump	6.39 m (21 ft 0 in)
2017	AAU Junior Olympic Games	Ypsilanti, Michigan	1st	Triple jump	12.50 m (41 ft 0 in)
2017	AAU Junior Olympic Games	Ypsilanti, Michigan	1st	Long jump	5.84 m (19 ft 2 in)
2017	USATF Junior Olympic Track & Field Championships	Lawrence, Kansas	1st	Triple jump	13.00 m (42 ft 8 in)
2017	USATF U20 Outdoor Championships	Sacramento, California	2nd	Triple jump	13.27 m (43 ft 6 in)
2017	New Balance Indoor Nationals	New York City, New York	1st	Triple jump	12.97 m (42 ft 7 in)
2017	New Balance Indoor Nationals	New York City, New York	3rd	Long jump	6.19 m (20 ft 4 in)
2016	USATF Junior Olympic Track & Field Championships	Sacramento, California	1st	Triple jump	12.87 m (42 ft 3 in)
2016	USATF Junior Olympic Track & Field Championships	Sacramento, California	2nd	Long jump	5.83 m (19 ft 2 in)
2016	New Balance Nationals Outdoor	Greensboro, North Carolina	1st	Triple jump	13.25 m (43 ft 6 in)
2016	New Balance Nationals Outdoor	Greensboro, North Carolina	3rd	Long jump	6.16 m (20 ft 3 in)
2015	USATF Junior Olympic Track & Field Championships	Jacksonville, Florida	3rd	Triple jump	12.43 m (40 ft 9 in)
2015	AAU Junior Olympic Games	Norfolk, Virginia	1st	Triple jump	12.36 m (40 ft 7 in)
2015	AAU Junior Olympic Games	Norfolk, Virginia	1st	Long jump	5.62 m (18 ft 5 in)

=== NCAA ===
Moore is a seven-time NCAA Division I champion, North American triple jump record holder, NCAA triple jump record holder, NCAA indoor long jump record holder, collegiate indoor triple jump record holder, 14-time NCAA Division I All-American jumper, and 11-time Southeastern Conference champion.

Year	Competition	Venue	Position	Event	Notes
Representing Florida Gators
2023	2023 NCAA Division I Outdoor Track and Field Championships	University of Texas at Austin; Mike A. Myers Stadium	3rd	Long jump	6.66 m (21 ft 10 in)
2023	2023 NCAA Division I Outdoor Track and Field Championships	University of Texas at Austin; Mike A. Myers Stadium	1st	Triple jump	14.78 m (48 ft 6 in) CR MR
2023	SEC Outdoor Track and Field Championships	Louisiana State University; Bernie Moore Track Stadium	1st	Long jump	6.88 m (22 ft 7 in)
2023	SEC Outdoor Track and Field Championships	Louisiana State University; Bernie Moore Track Stadium	1st	Triple jump	14.14 m (46 ft 5 in)
2023	2023 NCAA Division I Indoor Track and Field Championships	Albuquerque, New Mexico	1st	Long jump	7.03 m (23 ft 1 in) CR MR
2023	2023 NCAA Division I Indoor Track and Field Championships	Albuquerque, New Mexico	1st	Triple jump	15.12 m (49 ft 7 in) AR NR CR MR
2023	SEC Indoor Track and Field Championships	University of Arkansas; Randal Tyson Track Center	1st	Long jump	6.91 m (22 ft 8 in)
2023	SEC Indoor Track and Field Championships	University of Arkansas; Randal Tyson Track Center	1st	Triple jump	14.09 m (46 ft 3 in)
2022	2022 NCAA Division I Outdoor Track and Field Championships	University of Oregon	1st	Long jump	6.72 m (22 ft 1 in)
2022	2022 NCAA Division I Outdoor Track and Field Championships	University of Oregon	1st	Triple jump	14.32 m (47 ft 0 in)
2022	SEC Outdoor Track and Field Championships	University of Mississippi	1st	Long jump	6.73 m (22 ft 1 in)
2022	SEC Outdoor Track and Field Championships	University of Mississippi	1st	Triple jump	14.46 m (47 ft 5 in) +2.5w
2022	2022 NCAA Division I Indoor Track and Field Championships	Birmingham Metro CrossPlex	1st	Long jump	6.57 m (21 ft 7 in)
2022	2022 NCAA Division I Indoor Track and Field Championships	Birmingham Metro CrossPlex	1st	Triple jump	14.57 m (47 ft 10 in)
2022	SEC Indoor Track and Field Championships	Texas A&M University	1st	Long jump	6.75 m (22 ft 2 in)
2022	SEC Indoor Track and Field Championships	Texas A&M University	1st	Triple jump	14.11 m (46 ft 4 in)
Representing Georgia Bulldogs
2021	2021 NCAA Division I Outdoor Track and Field Championships	University of Oregon; Hayward Field	3rd	Long jump	6.65 m (21 ft 10 in)
2021	2021 NCAA Division I Outdoor Track and Field Championships	University of Oregon; Hayward Field	2nd	Triple jump	14.13 m (46 ft 4 in)
2021	SEC Outdoor Track and Field Championships	Texas A&M University	3rd	Long jump	6.64 m (21 ft 9 in)
2021	SEC Outdoor Track and Field Championships	Texas A&M University	1st	Triple jump	14.39 m (47 ft 3 in)
2021	2021 NCAA Division I Indoor Track and Field Championships	University of Arkansas	8th	Long jump	6.40 m (21 ft 0 in)
2021	2021 NCAA Division I Indoor Track and Field Championships	University of Arkansas	4th	Triple jump	13.73 m (45 ft 1 in)
2021	SEC Indoor Track and Field Championships	University of Arkansas	2nd	Long jump	6.34 m (20 ft 10 in)
2021	SEC Indoor Track and Field Championships	University of Arkansas	1st	Triple jump	13.97 m (45 ft 10 in)
2020	2020 NCAA Division I Indoor Track and Field Championships	University of New Mexico	Cancelled due to COVID-19	Long jump	All-American
2020	2020 NCAA Division I Indoor Track and Field Championships	University of New Mexico	Cancelled due to COVID-19	Triple jump	All-American
2020	SEC Indoor Track and Field Championships	Texas A&M University; Gilliam Indoor Track Stadium	2nd	Long jump	6.43 m (21 ft 1 in)
2020	SEC Indoor Track and Field Championships	Texas A&M University; Gilliam Indoor Track Stadium	1st	Triple jump	13.74 m (45 ft 1 in)

=== Prep ===
Moore is from Grand Prairie, Texas. She is a Lake Ridge High School alumnus and a former student at the University of Georgia.

She is a nine-time Texas state UIL champion.

She is a 2019 Texas state University Interscholastic League champion in the triple jump 13.66 m (44 ft 10 in), long jump 6.28 m (20 ft 7 in). She is a 2018 Texas state University Interscholastic League champion in the triple jump 13.83 m (45 ft 4 in), long jump 6.30 m (20 ft 8 in), 4 × 200 m in 1:37.11, and 2nd place 4x100 m in 46.30.

Moore is a 2017 Texas state University Interscholastic League champion in the triple jump 13.23 m (43 ft 5 in), long jump 5.97 m (19 ft 7 in), 4th place in 4 × 400 m in 3:51.80, and 2nd place 4x100 m in 45.55. She is a 2016 Texas state University Interscholastic League champion in the triple jump 12.85 m (42 ft 2 in), long jump 6.05 m (19 ft 10 in), and 4th place in 4x400 m in 3:51.44.
