= Tara Davis-Woodhall =

American track and field athlete (born 1999)

Tara Davis-Woodhall OLY
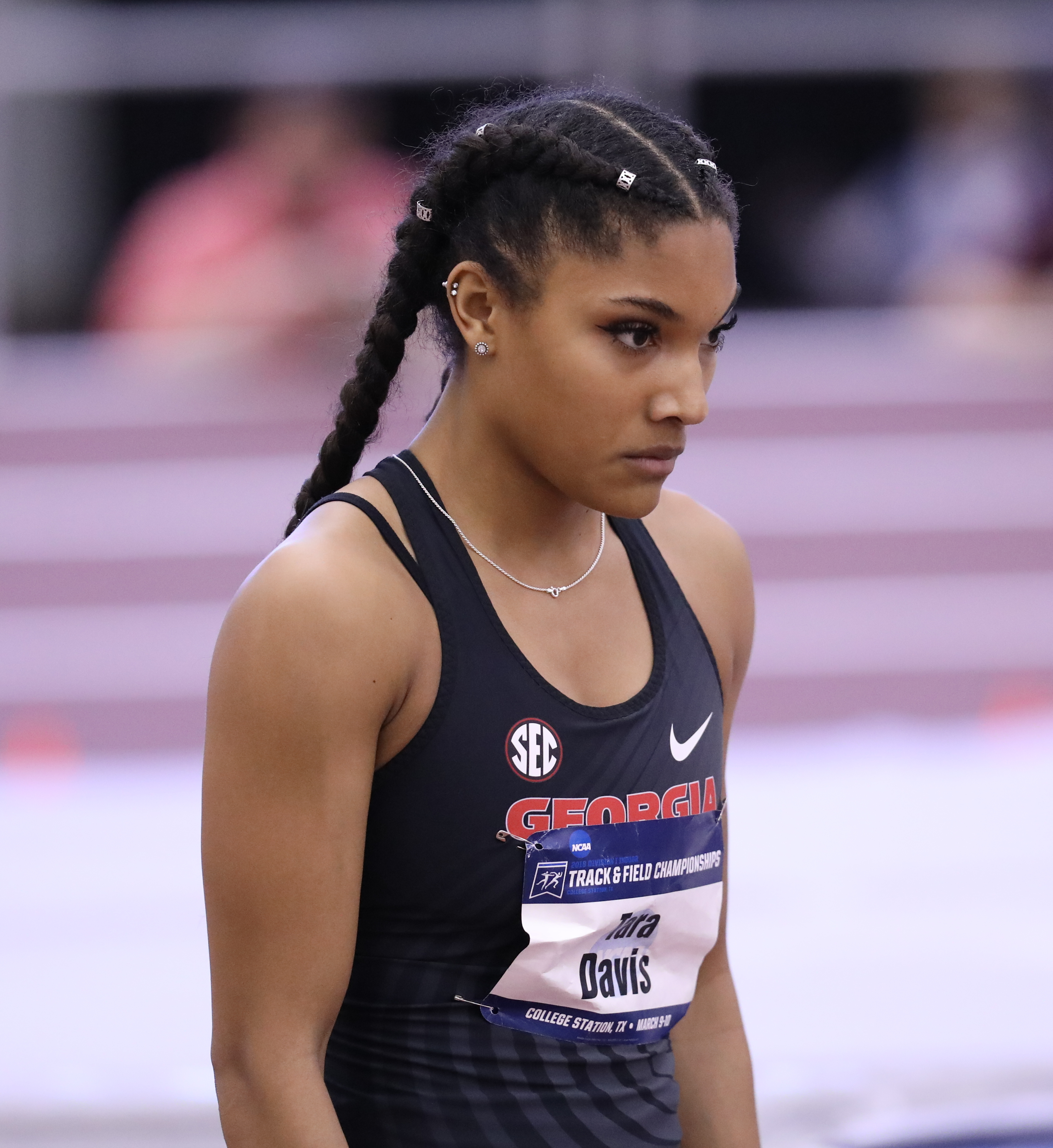
- Davis-Woodhall in 2018

Personal information
- Full name: Tara Davis-Woodhall
- Born: Tara Davis; May 20, 1999 (age 27) Mesquite, Texas, U.S.
- Home town: Agoura Hills, California, U.S.
- Height: 5 ft 4 in (163 cm)
- Weight: 120 lb (54 kg)
- Spouse: Hunter Woodhall (m. 2022)

Sport
- Country: United States
- Sport: Track and field
- Event: Long jump
- College team: Texas Longhorns (2019–2021); Georgia Bulldogs (2017–2018)
- Turned pro: 2021

Achievements and titles
- Olympic finals: 2020 Tokyo; Long jump, 6th; 2024 Paris; Long jump, Gold
- Highest world ranking: 1st (long jump, 2024)
- Personal bests: 60 m hurdles: 7.98 i (College Station 2018); 100 m hurdles: 12.47 (Los Angeles 2026); Long jump: 7.20 m (23 ft 7 1/4 in) (Los Angeles 2026)
Medal record
Women's athletics
Representing the United States
Olympic Games
Gold medal – first place	2024 Paris	Long jump
World Championships
Gold medal – first place	2025 Tokyo	Long jump
Silver medal – second place	2023 Budapest	Long jump
World Indoor Championships
Gold medal – first place	2024 Glasgow	Long jump
World Junior Championships
Bronze medal – third place	2018 Tampere	Long jump
World Youth Championships
Gold medal – first place	2015 Cali	Long jump
Pan American Junior Championships
Gold medal – first place	2017 Trujillo	4 × 100 m relay
Gold medal – first place	2017 Trujillo	Long jump
Silver medal – second place	2017 Trujillo	100 m hurdles

Tara Davis-Woodhall (/ˈtɑːrə/ TAR-ə; née Davis; born May 20, 1999) is an American track and field athlete. She won a gold medal in women's long jump at the 2024 Summer Olympics and also a silver medal at the 2023 World Championships. In 2017, she set the American junior women's record in the indoor long jump, and placed 6th in the women's long jump final at the 2020 Summer Olympics.

== Early life and education ==
Davis-Woodhall was born Tara Davis in Mesquite, Texas, to parents Ty and Rayshone Davis. Her father is a former track and field athlete at Texas A&M. She grew up in Frisco, Texas, and is the youngest of five children.

Davis-Woodhall is a 2017 graduate of Agoura High School in Agoura Hills, California, where she was a top track and field athlete. She attended the University of Georgia, where she competed in track and field for the Georgia Bulldogs, but after one year transferred to the University of Texas to compete for the Texas Longhorns.

== Career ==
=== High school ===
Davis-Woodhall broke the American junior record for indoor long jump at the Dumanis Sports Group Prep Classic in Frisco, Texas on February 11, 2017, with a distance of 6.68 m (21 ft 10 3/4 in).

Later in the year, running for Agoura High School, she won three events at the CIF California State Meet. Her win in the 100 meters hurdles in 12.83 beat the National high school record, but it was aided by a +3.7 mps wind. Her mark is the best under all conditions in history. She also set the state record in the long jump. Her 22 ft 1 in (6.73 m) beat the 24-year-old record by Olympian Marion Jones, who at the time jumped for another Marmonte League school, Thousand Oaks High School. A few weeks earlier, she had run the hurdles in 12.89 at the Ventura County meet. It was the second fastest wind legal race in history. She was selected Ventura County Track and Field Athlete of the Year.

=== Collegiate ===
After graduating high school in 2017, Davis-Woodhall attended the University of Georgia, where she was coached by Petros Kyprianou. There she broke Klaudia Siciarz's world under-20 record in the 60 m hurdles with a time of 7.98 seconds, during the 2018 NCAA Indoor Track and Field Championships. In the same meet, she came third in the long jump, completing a University of Georgia sweep. She finished behind Keturah Orji and Kate Hall.

In 2018, after one season at Georgia, Davis-Woodhall transferred to the University of Texas. She did not get to compete until the 2019–20 track season, because of transfer rules. She went on to appeal her old coach's decision to hold her from being released from the team.

In 2021, Davis-Woodhall jumped 7.14 m (23 ft 5 in) at the Texas Relays in Austin to set the collegiate record. The jump placed her in the top 30 of all time.

=== International ===
Davis-Woodhall qualified for the 2020 Summer Olympics by jumping 7.04 m (23 ft 1 in) to place second at the Olympic Trials in June 2021. She placed sixth in the women's long jump at the Olympic final, with a best distance jumped of 6.84 m (22 ft 5 1/4 in).

Davis-Woodhall won the national long jumping title at the USA Indoor Track and Field Championships in Albuquerque in February 2023, with a distance of 6.99 meters. She was later stripped of the title after a urine sample she submitted at the event showed a cannabis metabolite level above the allowed limit. She received a reduced suspension of one month after completing a substance abuse treatment program.

Davis-Woodhall won a silver medal in the women's long jump at the 2023 World Athletics Championships in Budapest, Hungary, with a distance of 6.91 m (22 ft 8 in). She competed at the 2024 World Athletics Indoor Championships where she won a gold medal in the long jump with a distance of 7.07 m (23 ft 2 1/4 in).

Davis-Woodhall won the gold medal in the long jump at the 2024 Summer Olympics with a distance of 7.10 m (23 ft 3 1/2 in). She celebrated with her husband, Hunter Woodhall, who went on to win a gold medal at the 2024 Summer Paralympics. She was nominated for her first World Athletics Award because of her gold medals in the 2024 sports season.

Davis-Woodhall set her personal best in the 100 hurdles of 12.47 (+1.5) at the 2026 Los Angeles Grand Prix. An hour later she improved her personal best in the long jump to 7.20 m (23 ft 7 1/4 in) +1.2. About 10 minutes later she jumped a wind aided 7.25m +3.3.

=== Coaching ===
As of August 2024, she serves as an assistant coach for Kansas State University track and field team.

=== Endorsements ===
In July 2026, Davis-Woodhall was announced as a brand ambassador for BOSS Bottled Beyond for Her, alongside actress Jessica Chastain and singer Becky G.

== Achievements ==
=== International competitions ===
Representing the United States
Year	Competition	Venue	Position	Event	Result	Notes
2015	World Youth Championships	Cali, Colombia	1st	Long jump	6.41 m	PB
2015	World Youth Championships	Cali, Colombia	9th	Triple jump	12.65 m	
2017	Pan American U20 Championships	Trujillo, Peru	1st	Long jump	6.51 m	
2017	Pan American U20 Championships	Trujillo, Peru	2nd	100 m hurdles	13.42	
2017	Pan American U20 Championships	Trujillo, Peru	1st	4 × 100 m relay	44.07	
2018	World U20 Championships	Tampere, Finland	3rd	Long jump	6.36 m	
2021	Olympic Games	Tokyo, Japan	6th	Long jump	6.84 m	
2023	World Championships	Budapest, Hungary	2nd	Long jump	6.91 m	
2024	World Indoor Championships	Glasgow, United Kingdom	1st	Long jump	7.07 m	
2024	Olympic Games	Paris, France	1st	Long jump	7.10 m	
2025	World Championships	Tokyo, Japan	1st	Long jump	7.13 m	

== Personal life ==
Davis-Woodhall married Paralympian Hunter Woodhall on October 16, 2022, having first met at a track meet in Idaho in 2017. They operate a YouTube channel together.
