= 1994 European Athletics Championships – Women's triple jump =

Women's triple jump at the European Athletics Championships

The final of the Women's Triple Jump event at the 1994 European Championships in Helsinki, Finland was held on Thursday August 20, 1994. There were a total of 26 participating athletes including one non-starter, with two qualifying groups. The top twelve and ties, and all those reaching 14.20 metres advanced to the final. The qualification round was held in Wednesday August 19, 1994. The event was included for the first time at the European Athletics Championships.

== Medalists ==
Gold	Anna Biryukova; Russia (RUS)
Silver	Inna Lasovskaya; Russia (RUS)
Bronze	Inessa Kravets; Ukraine (UKR)

== Abbreviations ==
- All results shown are in metres

Q	automatic qualification
q	qualification by rank
DNS	did not start
NM	no mark
WR	world record
AR	area record
NR	national record
PB	personal best
SB	season best

== Results ==
=== Final ===
8 August

Rank	Name	Nationality	Attempts						Result	Notes
Rank	Name	Nationality	1	2	3	4	5	6	Result	Notes
1st place, gold medalist(s)	Anna Biryukova	Russia							14.89 (w: 1.1 m/s)	
2nd place, silver medalist(s)	Inna Lasovskaya	Russia							14.85 w (w: 3.1 m/s)	
3rd place, bronze medalist(s)	Inessa Kravets	Ukraine							14.67 w (w: 2.1 m/s)	
4	Iolanda Chen	Russia							14.48 w (w: 2.2 m/s)	
5	Rodica Petrescu	Romania							14.42 (w: 0.8 m/s)	
6	Šárka Kašpárková	Czech Republic							13.98 (w: 1.6 m/s)	
7	Ramona Molzan	Germany							13.82 (w: 1.6 m/s)	
8	Helga Radtke	Germany							13.77 (w: 0.7 m/s)	
9	Concepción Paredes	Spain							13.68 (w: -0.2 m/s)	
10	Michelle Griffith	United Kingdom							13.60 (w: 0.9 m/s)	
11	Rachel Kirby	United Kingdom							13.45 (w: 0.7 m/s)	
	Sofiya Bozhanova	Bulgaria							DQ	Doping^{†}

^{†}: Sofiya Bozhanova ranked initially 4th (14.58m (w: +1.1 m/s)), but was tested positive for amphetamine and disqualified for infringement of IAAF doping rules.

=== Qualification ===
7 August

==== Group A ====
Rank	Name	Nationality	Result	Notes
1	Inna Lasovskaya	Russia	14.33 (w: 1.7 m/s)	Q
2	Inessa Kravets	Ukraine	14.08 (w: 0.7 m/s)	Q
3	Anna Biryukova	Russia	13.94 (w: -1.7 m/s)	Q
4	Concepción Paredes	Spain	13.78 (w: -0.2 m/s)	q
5	Rachel Kirby	United Kingdom	13.64 (w: 1.1 m/s)	q
6	Michelle Griffith	United Kingdom	13.64 (w: -0.1 m/s)	q
7	Betty Lise	France	13.35 (w: -0.9 m/s)	
8	Petra Laux	Germany	13.18 (w: -1.3 m/s)	
9	Yelena Stakhova	Belarus	13.14 (w: 0.2 m/s)	
10	Marika Salminen	Finland	12.97 (w: 0.2 m/s)	
11	Anni Paananen	Finland	12.95 (w: 0.1 m/s)	
	Iva Prandzheva	Bulgaria	NM	
	Olympia Menelaou	Cyprus	DNS	

==== Group B ====
Rank	Name	Nationality	Result	Notes
1	Iolanda Chen	Russia	14.15 (w: 0.1 m/s)	Q
2	Ramona Molzan	Germany	13.96 (w: 0.9 m/s)	Q
3	Rodica Petrescu	Romania	13.89 (w: -0.9 m/s)	Q
4	Šárka Kašpárková	Czech Republic	13.87 (w: 1.3 m/s)	Q
5	Helga Radtke	Germany	13.84 (w: -1.7 m/s)	q
6	Barbara Lah	Italy	13.59 (w: 0.3 m/s)	
7	Valérie Guiyoule	France	13.55 (w: -0.2 m/s)	
8	Ashia Hansen	United Kingdom	13.45 (w: 0.8 m/s)	
9	Natalya Klimovets	Belarus	13.37 (w: 1.7 m/s)	
10	Carina Kjellman	Finland	13.34 (w: 0.5 m/s)	
11	Virge Naeris	Estonia	13.16 (w: -0.7 m/s)	
12	Jeļena Blaževiča	Latvia	13.02 (w: -1.4 m/s)	
	Sofiya Bozhanova	Bulgaria	DQ	Q^{†}

^{†}: Sofiya Bozhanova initially reached the final (14.08m (w: -1.7 m/s)), but was disqualified later for infringement of IAAF doping rules.

== Participation ==
According to an unofficial count, 25 athletes from 14 countries participated in the event.

- Belarus (2)
- Bulgaria (2)
- Czech Republic (1)
- Estonia (1)
- Finland (3)
- France (2)
- Germany (3)
- Italy (1)
- Latvia (1)
- Romania (1)
- Russia (3)
- Spain (1)
- Ukraine (1)
- United Kingdom (3)

== See also ==
- 1993 Women's World Championships Triple Jump (Stuttgart)
- 1995 Women's World Championships Triple Jump (Gothenburg)
- 1996 Women's Olympic Triple Jump (Atlanta)
- 1997 Women's World Championships Triple Jump (Athens)
