= 1998 European Athletics Championships – Women's triple jump =

Women's triple jump at the European Athletics Championships

The women's triple jump at the 1998 European Athletics Championships was held at the Népstadion on 19 and 20 August.

== Medalists ==
Gold	Olga Vasdeki; Greece
Silver	Šárka Kašpárková; Czech Republic
Bronze	Tereza Marinova; Bulgaria

== Results ==
KEY:	q	Better non-qualifiers	Q	Qualified	NR	National record	PB	Personal best	SB	Seasonal best

=== Qualification ===
Qualification: Qualification Performance 14.20 (Q) or at least 12 best performers advance to the final.

Rank	Group	Athlete	Nationality	#1	#2	#3	Result	Notes
1	A	Šárka Kašpárková	Czech Republic				14.59	Q
1	A	Olga Vasdeki	Greece				14.59	Q
2	B	Yelena Donkina	Russia				14.45	Q
4	B	Tereza Marinova	Bulgaria				14.43	Q
5	B	Rodica Mateescu	Romania				14.41	Q
6	B	Olena Hovorova	Ukraine				14.31	Q
7	B	Natallia Safronava	Belarus				14.24	Q
8	B	Paraskevi Tsiamita	Greece				14.23	Q
9	A	Yelena Lebedenko	Russia				14.18	q
10	A	Adelina Gavrilă	Romania				14.10	q
11	A	Iva Prandzheva	Bulgaria				14.08	q
11	B	Tatyana Lebedeva	Russia				14.08	q
13	A	Betty Lise	France				14.06	
14	A	Gundega Sproģe	Latvia				14.02	
15	A	Barbara Lah	Italy				13.91	
16	B	Maria Costanza Moroni	Italy				13.89	
17	A	Anja Valant	Slovenia				13.85	
18	A	Virge Naeris	Estonia				13.85	
19	B	Dorthe Jensen	Denmark				13.78	
20	A	Connie Henry	Great Britain				13.77	
21	B	Heli Koivula	Finland				13.75	
22	A	Cosmina Boaja	Romania				13.72	
23	B	Jeļena Blaževiča	Latvia				13.62	
24	B	Sylvie Borda	France				13.55	
25	B	Ilona Pazoła	Poland				13.52	
26	B	Mariya Dimitrova	Bulgaria				13.40	
27	A	Vera Bitanji	Albania				11.44	

=== Final ===
Rank	Athlete	Nationality	#1	#2	#3	#4	#5	#6	Result	Notes
1st place, gold medalist(s)	Olga Vasdeki	Greece	14.25	14.42	14.55	14.48	x	x	14.55	
2nd place, silver medalist(s)	Šárka Kašpárková	Czech Republic	14.53	14.26	14.49	x	14.09	14.52	14.53	
3rd place, bronze medalist(s)	Tereza Marinova	Bulgaria	14.29	14.33	x	14.36	x	14.50	14.50	
4	Rodica Mateescu	Romania	14.39	14.40	14.46	14.45	x	13.83	14.46	
5	Tatyana Lebedeva	Russia	13.86	14.02	14.18	14.25	x	14.08	14.25	
6	Olena Hovorova	Ukraine	14.24	14.22	14.17	14.23	x	13.99	14.24	
7	Natallia Safronava	Belarus	13.97	13.73	13.95	14.01	13.67	13.90	14.01	
8	Yelena Donkina	Russia	13.92	13.55	12.63	x	x	x	13.92	
9	Paraskevi Tsiamita	Greece	x	13.90	13.89				13.90	
10	Yelena Lebedenko	Russia	x	13.55	13.82				13.82	
11	Adelina Gavrilă	Romania	13.17	13.04	13.28				13.28	
	Iva Prandzheva	Bulgaria	x	–	–				NM	
