= 1994 European Athletics Indoor Championships – Women's triple jump =

The women's triple jump event at the 1994 European Athletics Indoor Championships was held in Palais Omnisports de Paris-Bercy on 12 and 13 March.

== Medalists ==
Gold	Silver	Bronze
Inna Lasovskaya; Russia	Anna Biryukova; Russia	Sofiya Bozhanova; Bulgaria

== Results ==
=== Qualification ===
Qualification performance: 13.40 (Q) or at least 12 best performers (q) advanced to the final.

Rank	Athlete	Nationality	#1	#2	#3	Result	Notes
1	Inna Lasovskaya	Russia	14.22			14.22	Q, CR
2	Anna Biryukova	Russia	14.05			14.05	Q
3	Sofiya Bozhanova	Bulgaria	14.05			13.85	Q
4	Rodica Petrescu	Romania	11.08	13.83		13.83	Q
5	Helga Radtke	Germany	13.82			13.82	Q
6	Iva Prandzheva	Bulgaria	13.80			13.80	Q
7	Monica Toth	Romania	13.07	13.68		13.68	Q
8	Šárka Kašpárková	Czech Republic	13.67			13.67	Q
9	Tanja Borrmann	Germany	13.27	13.51		13.51	Q
10	Virge Naeris	Estonia	13.21	13.50		13.50	Q
11	Inessa Kravets	Ukraine	13.23	13.46		13.46	Q
12	Agnieszka Stańczyk	Poland	x	13.46		13.46	Q
13	Michelle Griffith	Great Britain	13.36	13.41		13.41	Q
14	Urszula Włodarczyk	Poland	x	13.19	13.35	13.35	
15	Rachel Kirby	Great Britain	13.20	x	13.31	13.31	
16	Ashia Hansen	Great Britain	x	13.30	x	13.30	
17	Concepción Paredes	Spain	13.21	x	13.03	13.21	
18	Antonella Capriotti	Italy	13.14	12.52	13.08	13.14	
19	Valérie Guiyoule	France	13.04	x	x	13.04	
20	Angela Barylla	Germany	12.99	13.00	x	13.00	
21	Chukwuwete Olomina	Sweden	12.65	12.63	12.56	12.65	
22	Figen Uğraş	Turkey	x	x	11.58	11.58	
	Ljudmila Ninova	Austria				DNS	

=== Final ===
Rank	Name	Nationality	#1	#2	#3	#4	#5	#6	Result	Notes
1st place, gold medalist(s)	Inna Lasovskaya	Russia	13.86	14.88	x	14.67	14.81	x	14.88	CR
2nd place, silver medalist(s)	Anna Biryukova	Russia	14.35	14.58	14.72	x	14.39	14.39	14.72	
3rd place, bronze medalist(s)	Sofiya Bozhanova	Bulgaria	x	14.52	14.47	14.11	x	14.39	14.52	NR
4	Šárka Kašpárková	Czech Republic	14.05	14.20	x	x	14.17	14.46	14.46	NR
5	Iva Prandzheva	Bulgaria	14.33	14.18	14.38	14.17	14.36	13.85	14.38	
6	Inessa Kravets	Ukraine	x	x	13.73	14.07	14.32	x	14.32	
7	Helga Radtke	Germany	13.78	13.75	x	x	13.79	13.92	13.92	
8	Rodica Petrescu	Romania	13.83	12.94	13.74	13.90	13.71	13.70	13.90	
9	Monica Toth	Romania	13.48	13.66	12.77				13.66	
10	Michelle Griffith	Great Britain	x	13.45	13.55				13.55	
11	Virge Naeris	Estonia	13.22	12.79	13.44				13.44	
12	Tanja Borrmann	Germany	x	13.36	13.26				13.36	
13	Agnieszka Stańczyk	Poland	13.14	13.30	x				13.30	
