= 1995 IAAF World Indoor Championships – Women's triple jump =

The women's triple jump event at the 1995 IAAF World Indoor Championships was held on 10–11 March.

== Medalists ==
Gold	Silver	Bronze
Yolanda Chen; Russia	Iva Prandzheva; Bulgaria	Ren Ruiping; China

== Results ==
=== Qualification ===
Qualification: 13.60 (Q) or at least 12 best performers (q) qualified for the final.

Rank	Name	Nationality	#1	#2	#3	Result	Notes
1	Ren Ruiping	China	14.17			14.17	Q
2	Šárka Kašpárková	Czech Republic	14.02			14.02	Q
3	Iva Prandzheva	Bulgaria	13.99			13.99	Q
4	Rodica Petrescu	Romania	13.88			13.88	Q
5	Concepción Paredes	Spain	13.82			13.82	Q
6	Niurka Montalvo	Cuba	13.37	13.27	13.77	13.77	Q
7	Mariya Sokova	Russia	13.74			13.74	Q
8	Yolanda Chen	Russia	13.73			13.73	Q
9	Yelena Govorova	Ukraine	13.39	13.71		13.71	Q
10	Virge Naeris	Estonia	13.39	13.64		13.64	Q
11	Sheila Hudson-Strudwick	United States	13.04	13.47	13.59	13.59	q
12	Barbara Lah	Italy	13.59	x	13.21	13.59	q
13	Cynthea Rhodes	United States	13.49	x	13.52	13.52	q
14	Yelena Khlusovich	Ukraine	13.37	13.00	13.29	13.37	
15	Valérie Guiyoule	France	13.21	12.97	13.15	13.21	
16	Anja Valant	Slovenia	x	13.05	13.20	13.20	
17	Caroline Honoré	France	13.14	13.18	x	13.18	
18	Claudia Vetsch	Switzerland	13.10	13.15	13.11	13.15	
19	Angela Barylla	Germany	13.11	13.00	x	13.11	
20	Stephanie Betga	Cameroon	x	12.28	x	12.28	
	Tanja Borrmann	Germany	x	x	x	NM	

=== Final ===
Rank	Name	Nationality	#1	#2	#3	#4	#5	#6	Results	Notes
1st place, gold medalist(s)	Yolanda Chen	Russia	14.45	x	15.03	14.47	–	14.58	15.03	WR
2nd place, silver medalist(s)	Iva Prandzheva	Bulgaria	12.32	x	13.97	14.25	14.39	14.71	14.71	
3rd place, bronze medalist(s)	Ren Ruiping	China	14.17	12.04	14.37	14.12	x	14.32	14.37	
4	Šárka Kašpárková	Czech Republic	x	14.02	13.97	14.14	14.25	14.07	14.25	
5	Mariya Sokova	Russia	14.02	14.11	13.84	14.06	13.99	14.22	14.22	
6	Niurka Montalvo	Cuba	13.90	13.69	x	x	x	14.04	14.04	
7	Yelena Govorova	Ukraine	13.77	13.79	13.61	14.04	13.65	13.80	14.04	
8	Sheila Hudson-Strudwick	United States	13.23	13.71	13.20	13.73	13.88	13.54	13.88	
9	Rodica Petrescu	Romania	13.60	–	–				13.60	
10	Concepción Paredes	Spain	13.46	x	x				13.46	
11	Virge Naeris	Estonia	12.99	13.40	13.16				13.40	
12	Cynthea Rhodes	United States	12.77	12.69	12.92				12.92	
13	Barbara Lah	Italy	x	x	12.88				12.88	
