= 1997 World Championships in Athletics – Women's triple jump =

These are the official results of the Women's Triple Jump event at the 1997 IAAF World Championships in Athens, Greece. There were a total number of 41 participating athletes, with two qualifying groups and the final held on Monday August 4, 1997. The qualification mark was set at 14.30 metres.

== Medalists ==
Gold	Šárka Kašpárková; Czech Republic (CZE)
Silver	Rodica Mateescu; Romania (ROM)
Bronze	Olena Hovorova; Ukraine (UKR)

== Results ==
=== Qualification ===
Held on Saturday 1997-08-02

Qualification: 14.30 m (Q) or at least 12 best (q) qualified for the final.

Rank	Group	Athlete	Nationality	#1	#2	#3	Result	Notes
1	A	Ashia Hansen	Great Britain	x	14.77		14.77	Q
2	B	Rodica Mateescu	Romania	13.63	14.57		14.57	Q
3	A	Betty Lise	France	13.97	13.81	14.50	14.50	Q, NR
4	A	Olga Vasdeki	Greece	14.23	14.49		14.49	Q, NR
5	A	Šárka Kašpárková	Czech Republic	14.17	14.44		14.44	Q
6	A	Olena Hovorova	Ukraine	14.39			14.39	Q
7	A	Zhanna Gureyeva	Belarus	x	x	14.35	14.35	Q, PB
7	A	Jeļena Blaževiča	Latvia	x	14.35		14.35	Q, SB
9	B	Tereza Marinova	Bulgaria	13.65	13.99	14.28	14.28	Q
10	A	Cynthea Rhodes	United States	x	13.77	14.25	14.25	q, PB
11	B	Gundega Sproge	Latvia	14.22	13.73	x	14.22	q
12	B	Petra Laux-Lobinger	Germany	12.77	14.02	14.17	14.17	q
13	B	Yamilé Aldama	Cuba	14.09	13.80	13.72	14.09	
14	A	Yelena Donkina	Russia	13.19	14.07	13.79	14.07	
15	A	Natalya Kayukova	Russia	x	13.90	14.06	14.06	
16	A	Ren Ruiping	China	14.06	x	x	14.06	
17	B	Galina Čisťaková	Slovakia	14.02	x	13.99	14.02	
18	B	Olena Khlusovych	Ukraine	13.87	13.42	x	13.87	
19	A	Heli Koivula	Finland	13.81	13.85		13.85	
20	A	Suzette Lee	Jamaica	x	13.82	13.82	13.82	
21	B	Maria de Souza	Brazil	13.51	x	13.75	13.75	
22	B	Yelena Stakhova	Belarus	x	13.54	13.71	13.71	
23	B	Barbara Lah	Italy	13.70	x	x	13.70	
24	B	Dorthe Jensen	Denmark	13.17	x	13.69	13.69	PB
25	B	Michelle Griffith	Great Britain	x	12.88	13.67	13.67	
26	A	Zlatka Georgieva	Bulgaria	13.52	x	12.87	13.52	
27	B	Niambi Dennis	United States	x	13.51	x	13.51	
28	B	Andrea Ávila	Argentina	x	13.45	13.25	13.45	
29	A	Jackie Edwards	Bahamas	x	12.95	13.39	13.39	
30	A	Anja Valant	Slovenia	x	13.36	12.74	13.36	
31	B	Trecia Smith	Jamaica	13.00	x	13.34	13.34	
32	A	Antonella Capriotti	Italy	13.32	x	x	13.32	
33	A	Marija Martinović	FR Yugoslavia	12.94	12.84	13.30	13.30	
34	A	Cristina Nicolau	Romania	x	x	13.25	13.25	
35	B	María Fletschmann	Guatemala	12.18	x	x	12.18	
36	B	Valérie Guiyoule	France	x	x	11.37	11.37	
	A	Shonda Swift	United States	x	x	x	NM	
	B	Anna Biryukova	Russia	x	x	x	NM	
	B	Cristina Morujão	Portugal	x	x	x	NM	
	A	Oksana Zelinskaya	Kazakhstan	x	x	x	DQ	
	B	Inessa Kravets	Ukraine	x	x	x	DNS	

=== Final ===
Rank	Athlete	Nationality	#1	#2	#3	#4	#5	#6	Result	Notes
1st place, gold medalist(s)	Šárka Kašpárková	Czech Republic	14.86	14.65	15.01	x	15.20	14.83	15.20	WL
2nd place, silver medalist(s)	Rodica Mateescu	Romania	15.16	x	14.90	14.38	14.84	12.21	15.16	NR
3rd place, bronze medalist(s)	Olena Hovorova	Ukraine	14.59	14.50	x	14.58	14.67	x	14.67	PB
4	Olga Vasdeki	Greece	14.39	14.36	14.26	14.46	14.62	14.60	14.62	NR
5	Ashia Hansen	Great Britain	13.99	14.36	x	14.41	14.21	14.49	14.49	
6	Tereza Marinova	Bulgaria	14.34	13.78	x	14.10	14.09	12.54	14.34	
7	Jeļena Blaževiča	Latvia	x	14.06	13.88	13.78	x	x	14.06	
8	Betty Lise	France	13.49	14.02	x	x	14.03	13.77	14.03	
9	Gundega Sproge	Latvia	13.65	x	13.98				13.98	
10	Petra Laux-Lobinger	Germany	x	13.64	13.86				13.86	
11	Cynthea Rhodes	United States	13.44	13.69	13.79				13.79	
12	Zhanna Gureyeva	Belarus	13.59	x	13.45				13.59	

== See also ==
- 1996 Women's Olympic Triple Jump
