= 1998 European Athletics Indoor Championships – Women's triple jump =

The women's triple jump event at the 1998 European Athletics Indoor Championships was held on 27–28 February.

== Medalists ==
Gold	Silver	Bronze
Ashia Hansen; Great Britain	Šárka Kašpárková; Czech Republic	Yelena Lebedenko; Russia

== Results ==
=== Qualification ===
Qualification performance: 14.00 (Q) or at least 12 best performers (q) advanced to the final.

Rank	Group	Athlete	Nationality	#1	#2	#3	Result	Notes
1	A	Ashia Hansen	Great Britain	13.88	14.48		14.48	Q
2	B	Šárka Kašpárková	Czech Republic	13.92	14.38		14.38	Q
3	A	Rodica Mateescu	Romania	14.12			14.12	Q
4	B	Betty Lise	France	14.09			14.09	Q, NR
5	A	Olga Vasdeki	Greece	14.05			14.05	Q
6	A	Tereza Marinova	Bulgaria	14.00			14.00	Q
6	B	Petra Lobinger	Germany	x	14.00		14.00	Q
8	A	Jeļena Blaževiča	Latvia	13.88	13.91	13.74	13.91	q
9	B	Cristina Nicolau	Romania	13.60	13.23	13.90	13.90	q
10	B	Yelena Lebedenko	Russia	13.83	13.49	13.52	13.83	q
11	A	Cosmina Boaja	Romania	13.17	13.62	x	13.62	q
12	B	Barbara Lah	Italy	13.57	13.56	12.30	13.57	q
13	B	Sandrine Domain	France	13.23	x	13.38	13.38	
14	A	Sylvia Borda	France	x	13.32	13.31	13.32	
15	B	Carlota Castrejana	Spain	13.01	x	13.14	13.14	
16	A	Concepción Paredes	Spain	13.12	x	x	13.12	
17	B	Zhanna Gureyeva	Belarus	12.87	x	x	12.87	

=== Final ===
Rank	Athlete	Nationality	#1	#2	#3	#4	#5	#6	Result	Notes
1st place, gold medalist(s)	Ashia Hansen	Great Britain	14.48	14.56	14.69	15.16	x	–	15.16	WR, CR
2nd place, silver medalist(s)	Šárka Kašpárková	Czech Republic	14.64	14.67	14.63	14.76	14.43	x	14.76	NR
3rd place, bronze medalist(s)	Yelena Lebedenko	Russia	13.07	14.08	13.97	13.84	14.32	x	14.32	
4	Olga Vasdeki	Greece	14.23	14.18	14.07	14.29	x	x	14.29	
5	Rodica Mateescu	Romania	14.15	14.22	14.21	14.27	x	13.85	14.27	
6	Betty Lise	France	14.08	14.15	x	14.26	13.95	13.91	14.26	NR
7	Cristina Nicolau	Romania	14.12	13.74	14.03	13.99	x	x	14.12	
8	Petra Lobinger	Germany	13.46	13.75	14.02	x	13.37	12.69	14.02	
9	Tereza Marinova	Bulgaria	13.57	x	13.81				13.81	
10	Cosmina Boaja	Romania	13.47	13.56	13.43				13.56	
11	Jeļena Blaževiča	Latvia	13.49	13.32	x				13.49	
12	Barbara Lah	Italy	x	13.15	x				13.15	
