= 1995 World Championships in Athletics – Women's triple jump =

Video on YouTube Official video

These are the official results of the Women's Triple Jump event at the 1995 IAAF World Championships in Gothenburg, Sweden. There were a total number of 32 participating athletes, with two qualifying groups and the final held on Thursday August 10, 1995.

This event was jumping in the same facility as Jonathan Edwards had set the still standing world record for men just three days earlier. Over the course of his series, Edwards had added 32 cm to Willie Banks' previous record that had stood for over a decade. The leader from the qualifying round was former world record holder Iolanda Chen.

The final started uneventfully with Rodica Mateescu taking the lead with 14.44m. The second round intensified with world record holder and defending champion Anna Biryukova jumping 14.85m to take the lead and Iva Prandzheva moving into second with a 14.76m.

The third round became eventful. Biryukova jumped 15.08m, within one cm of her existing world record. Meanwhile Inessa Kravets had fouled on her first two attempts, and a third foul would mean she was eliminated from the competition with no mark.

She adjusted her run up to be sure she would make a legal jump. Giving up almost the entire 20 cm width of the take off board, she took off at the back of the board. On three smooth, elongated steps she flew well past the 15 metre mark into the pit. The jump was measured at 15.50 m (50 ft 10 in), adding 41 cm to the existing world record - like Edwards, a Beamonesque improvement. Erom where she took off, the jump was closer to 15.78m.

The competition continued. In the fourth round, Inna Lasovskaya jumped 14.85m to move into third place. In the fifth round Prandzheva jumped past Lasovskaya and Biryukova with a 15.18m, at that point in time, the second best jump in history only to the world record set minutes earlier. And in the final round, Prandzheva again jumped 15.00m exactly, only her second best jump of the day.

Almost a year later, Kravets showed her jump was not a fluke, jumping 15.33m to win at the 1996 Olympics; Prandzheva was disqualified at those Olympics for a doping violation. Kravets was unable to defend her Olympic title in 2000 because she was suspended for the second time in her career for a doping violation.

At the 2020 Olympics, Yulimar Rojas of Venezuela jumped 15.67m on her final jump to finally break Kravets' world record after 26 years.

== Medalists ==
Gold	Inessa Kravets; Ukraine (UKR)
Silver	Iva Prandzheva; Bulgaria (BUL)
Bronze	Anna Biryukova; Russia (RUS)

== Schedule ==
- All times are Central European Time (UTC+1)

Qualification Round
Group A	Group B
08.08.1995 – 17:45h	08.08.1995 – 17:45h
Final Round
10.08.1995 – 16:55h

== Qualifying round ==
- Held on Tuesday 1995-08-08

Qualification: Qualifying Performance 14.05 (Q) or at least 12 best performers (q) advance to the final.

== Qualifying round ==
- Held on Saturday 1997-08-02

Rank	Group	Name	Result
1.	A	Iolanda Chen (RUS)	14.56 m
2.	A	Iva Prandzheva (BUL)	14.46 m
3.	B	Inessa Kravets (UKR)	14.44 m
4.	A	Zhanna Gureyeva (BLR)	14.41 m
5.	A	Inna Lasovskaya (RUS)	14.38 m
5.	B	Anna Biryukova (RUS)	14.38 m
7.	B	Jeļena Blaževiča (LAT)	14.29 m
8.	B	Ren Ruiping (CHN)	14.17 m
9.	A	Barbara Lah (ITA)	14.17 m
10.	B	Rodica Mateescu (ROM)	14.06 m
11.	A	Olena Hovorova (UKR)	14.05 m
12.	B	Michelle Griffith (GBR)	14.03 m
13.	A	Šárka Kašpárková (CZE)	13.94 m
14.	A	Valerie Guiyoule (FRA)	13.92 m
15.	B	Ramona Molzan (GER)	13.90 m
16.	B	Sheila Hudson (USA)	13.80 m
17.	B	Virge Naeris (EST)	13.76 m
18.	B	Concepción Paredes (ESP)	13.75 m
19.	A	Diana Wills-Orrange (USA)	13.71 m
20.	B	Cynthea Rhodes (USA)	13.68 m
21.	A	Ashia Hansen (GBR)	13.61 m
22.	A	Monica Toth (ROM)	13.52 m
23.	A	Wu Lingmei (CHN)	13.43 m
24.	B	Caroline Honoré (FRA)	13.41 m
25.	A	Andrea Avila (ARG)	13.41 m
26.	B	Betty Lise (FRA)	13.35 m
27.	A	Kaisa Gustafsson (FIN)	13.18 m
28.	A	Nicole Martial (GUY)	12.95 m
29.	A	Elisa Perez (DOM)	12.02 m
29.	B	Sonya Agbessi (BEN)	12.02 m
31.	B	Niurka Montalvo (CUB)	11.40 m
–	B	Althea Moses (BIZ)	NM

== Final ==
Rank	Athlete	Attempts						Distance	Note
Rank	Athlete	1	2	3	4	5	6	Distance	Note
1st place, gold medalist(s)	Inessa Kravets (UKR)	X	X	15.50	X	—	14.55	15.50 m	WR
2nd place, silver medalist(s)	Iva Prandzheva (BUL)	14.28	14.76	14.48	14.65	15.18	15.00	15.18 m	
3rd place, bronze medalist(s)	Anna Biryukova (RUS)	X	14.85	15.08	X	14.66	X	15.08 m	
4	Inna Lasovskaya (RUS)	X	X	14.52	14.85	X	14.90	14.90 m	
5	Rodica Mateescu (ROM)	14.44	14.56	X	14.82	14.39	14.64	14.82 m	
6	Ren Ruiping (CHN)	14.09	13.87	14.25	X	12.31	13.45	14.25 m	
7	Zhanna Gureyeva (BLR)	14.22	13.97	X	X	X	13.80	14.22 m	
8	Barbara Lah (ITA)	14.02	X	14.18	X	X	X	14.18 m	
9	Jeļena Blaževiča (LAT)	X	13.93	14.09				14.09 m	
10	Olena Hovorova (UKR)	14.07	X	X				14.07 m	
11	Iolanda Chen (RUS)	X	X	14.05				14.05 m	
12	Michelle Griffith (GBR)	13.22	12.97	13.59				13.59 m	

== See also ==
- 1996 Women's Olympic Triple Jump
