= 1997 IAAF World Indoor Championships – Women's triple jump =

Women's triple jump event

The women's triple jump event at the 1997 IAAF World Indoor Championships was held on March 7–8.

== Medalists ==
Gold	Silver	Bronze
Rodica Mateescu; Romania	Ashia Hansen; Great Britain	Šárka Kašpárková; Czech Republic

== Results ==
=== Qualification ===
Qualification: 13.80 (Q) or at least 12 best performers (q) qualified for the final.

Rank	Group	Athlete	Nationality	#1	#2	#3	Result	Notes
1	B	Rodica Mateescu	Romania	14.60			14.60	Q
2	B	Šárka Kašpárková	Czech Republic	13.37	14.37		14.37	Q
3	B	Petra Lobinger	Germany	13.79	13.61	14.28	14.28	Q, NR
4	A	Ashia Hansen	Great Britain	14.24			14.24	Q
5	A	Cristina Nicolau	Romania	13.75	x	14.23	14.23	Q, PB
6	A	Inna Lasovskaya	Russia	x	14.06		14.06	Q
7	B	Xi Ni Yo	China	13.98			13.98	Q
8	A	Tereza Marinova	Bulgaria	13.90			13.90	Q
9	B	Natalya Kayukova	Russia	13.72	13.86		13.86	Q
10	A	Yamilé Aldama	Cuba	13.82			13.82	Q
11	B	Olena Hovorova	Ukraine	13.80			13.80	Q
12	B	Betty Lise	France	13.79	13.33	–	13.79	q
13	A	Gundega Sproģe	Latvia	13.48	13.68	13.62	13.68	
14	A	Dorthe Jensen	Denmark	13.09	13.58	x	13.58	NR
15	A	Galina Chistyakova	Slovakia	13.30	12.89	13.46	13.46	
16	A	Niambi Dennis	United States	13.09	12.72	13.37	13.37	
17	B	Anja Valant	Slovenia	x	13.36	13.14	13.36	
18	B	Concepción Paredes	Spain	13.10	13.26	x	13.26	
19	A	Sylvie Borda	France	13.00	x	13.09	13.09	
20	A	Olena Khlusovych	Ukraine	13.05	x	11.89	13.05	
21	B	Maria de Souza	Brazil	12.43	12.45	x	12.45	
22	B	Telisa Young	United States	12.36	x	x	12.36	

=== Final ===
Rank	Name	Nationality	#1	#2	#3	#4	#5	#6	Result	Notes
1st place, gold medalist(s)	Inna Lasovskaya	Russia	14.60	14.72	15.01	–	14.94	14.59	15.01	WL
2nd place, silver medalist(s)	Ashia Hansen	Great Britain	14.70	–	–	14.48	14.56	–	14.70	NR
3rd place, bronze medalist(s)	Šárka Kašpárková	Czech Republic	14.45	14.62	–	–	–	14.66	14.66	NR
4	Rodica Mateescu	Romania	14.63	14.48	14.65	–	14.37	14.62	14.65	
5	Petra Lobinger	Germany	13.46	14.36	13.67	14.00	–	–	14.36	NR
6	Yamilé Aldama	Cuba	–	13.87	14.28	13.81	14.03	13.50	14.28	AR
7	Olena Hovorova	Ukraine	13.62	13.93	14.13	–	13.75	13.40	14.13	
8	Tereza Marinova	Bulgaria	14.00	–	13.77	–	13.56	13.85	14.00	PB
9	Betty Lise	France	13.39	13.94	13.96				13.96	NR
10	Cristina Nicolau	Romania	13.94	13.90	13.83				13.94	
11	Ren Ruiping	China	–	13.85	13.83				13.85	
12	Natalya Kayukova	Russia	–	13.58	–				13.58	
