= 1993 World Championships in Athletics – Women's triple jump =

These are the official results of the Women's Triple Jump event at the 1993 IAAF World Championships in Stuttgart, Germany. There were a total of 30 participating athletes, with two qualifying groups and the final held on Saturday August 21, 1993. For the first this event was staged at the World Championships.

== Medalists ==
Gold	Anna Biryukova; Russia (RUS)
Silver	Yolanda Chen; Russia (RUS)
Bronze	Iva Prandzheva; Bulgaria (BUL)

== Schedule ==
- All times are Central European Time (UTC+1)

Qualification Round
Group A	Group B
20.08.1993 – 11:00h	20.08.1993 – 11:00h
Final Round
21.08.1993 – 17:45h

== Abbreviations ==
- All results shown are in metres

Q	automatic qualification
q	qualification by rank
DNS	did not start
NM	no mark
WR	world record
AR	area record
NR	national record
PB	personal best
SB	season best

== Qualifying round ==
- Held on Friday 1993-08-20

RANK	GROUP A	HEIGHT
1.	Helga Radtke (GER)	14.14 m
2.	Yolanda Chen (RUS)	14.09 m
3.	Sarka Kasparkova (CZE)	13.98 m
4.	Niurka Montalvo (CUB)	13.68 m
5.	Ljudmila Ninova (AUT)	13.60 m
6.	Michelle Griffith (GBR)	13.48 m
7.	Urszula Włodarczyk (POL)	13.43 m
8.	Jeļena Blaževiča (LAT)	13.43 m
9.	Concepcion Paredes (ESP)	13.38 m
10.	Sheila Hudson (USA)	13.29 m
11.	Petra Laux-Lobinger (GER)	13.22 m
12.	Marika Salminen (FIN)	12.69 m
13.	Graciela Acosta (URU)	11.80 m
—	Ildiko Fekete (HUN)	NM
—	Sylvie Kabore (BUR)	DNS

RANK	GROUP B	HEIGHT
1.	Inna Lasovskaya (RUS)	14.05 m
2.	Anna Biryukova (RUS)	13.85 m
3.	Iva Prandzheva (BUL)	13.78 m
4.	Antonella Capriotti (ITA)	13.52 m
5.	Monica Toth (ROM)	13.48 m
6.	Rachel Kirby (GBR)	13.33 m
7.	Zhanna Gureyeva (BLR)	13.30 m
8.	Caroline Honore (FRA)	13.09 m
9.	Renata Nielsen (DEN)	12.96 m
10.	Cynthea Rhodes (USA)	12.90 m
11.	Althea Moses (BIZ)	12.17 m
—	Ermelinda Shehu (ALB)	NM
—	Andrea Avila (ARG)	NM
—	Anja Vokuhl (GER)	NM
—	Agnieszka Stańczyk (POL)	DNS

== Final ==
RANK	FINAL	DISTANCE
	Anna Biryukova (RUS)	15.09 m WR
	Yolanda Chen (RUS)	14.70 m
	Iva Prandzheva (BUL)	14.23 m
4.	Niurka Montalvo (CUB)	14.22 m
5.	Helga Radtke (GER)	14.19 m
6.	Antonella Capriotti (ITA)	14.18 m
7.	Šárka Kašpárková (CZE)	14.16 m
8.	Urszula Włodarczyk (POL)	13.80 m
9.	Michelle Griffith (GBR)	13.69 m
10.	Jeļena Blaževiča (LAT)	13.57 m
11.	Ljudmila Ninova (AUT)	13.30 m
12.	Monica Toth (ROM)	12.87 m
—	Inna Lasovskaya (RUS)	NM

== See also ==
- 1992 Men's Olympic Triple Jump
- 1995 Women's World Championships Triple Jump
