= 1993 IAAF World Indoor Championships – Women's triple jump =

The women's triple jump event at the 1993 IAAF World Indoor Championships was held on 13 and 14 March.

== Medalists ==
Gold	Silver	Bronze
Inessa Kravets; Ukraine	Iolanda Chen; Russia	Inna Lasovskaya; Russia

== Results ==
=== Qualification ===
Qualification: 13.50 (Q) or at least 12 best performers (q) qualified for the final.

Rank	Group	Name	Nationality	#1	#2	#3	Result	Notes
1	B	Inna Lasovskaya	Russia	x	14.25		14.25	Q
2	B	Concepción Paredes	Spain	13.46	13.96		13.96	Q, NR
3	B	Antonella Capriotti	Italy	13.73			13.73	Q, NR
4	B	Helga Radtke	Germany	13.22	13.47	13.72	13.72	Q
5	B	Šárka Kašpárková	Czech Republic	13.09	x	13.72	13.72	Q
6	B	Iolanda Chen	Russia	13.71			13.71	Q
7	B	Eloína Echevarría	Cuba	13.70			13.70	Q, NR
8	A	Andrea Ávila	Argentina	x	13.42	13.66	13.66	Q, NR
9	A	Sylvie Borda	France	x	13.61		13.61	Q
10	B	Inessa Kravets	Ukraine	x	13.12	13.56	13.56	Q
11	A	Flora Hyacinth	United States Virgin Islands	13.23	13.24	13.52	13.52	Q, NR
12	B	Anja Vokuhl	Germany	13.52			13.52	Q
13	B	Iolanda Oanta	Romania	12.09	13.22	13.32	13.32	
14	A	Rachel Kirby	Great Britain	13.27	x	x	13.27	
14	B	Zhang Yan	China	x	x	13.27	13.27	
16	A	Cynthea Rhodes	United States	13.15	12.98	13.05	13.15	
17	A	Lene Espegren	Norway	x	x	13.05	13.05	
18	B	Monica Toth	Romania	x	x	12.70	12.70	
19	A	Ksenija Predikaka	Slovenia	12.60	12.56	x	12.60	PB
20	A	Kelly Dinsmore	Canada	x	12.52	12.55	12.55	
21	A	Mary Berkeley-Agyepong	Great Britain	x	11.74	12.50	12.50	
	A	Claudia Haywood	United States	x	x	x	NM	
	A	Ildiko Fekete	Hungary	x	x	x	NM	
	A	Ljudmila Ninova-Rudoll	Austria				DNS	

=== Final ===
Rank	Name	Nationality	#1	#2	#3	#4	#5	#6	Result	Notes
1st place, gold medalist(s)	Inessa Kravets	Ukraine	13.71	x	14.20	14.34	14.47	14.33	14.47	WR
2nd place, silver medalist(s)	Iolanda Chen	Russia	14.18	x	13.66	14.27	14.36	x	14.36	
3rd place, bronze medalist(s)	Inna Lasovskaya	Russia	x	14.35	13.80	14.26	x	14.03	14.35	
4	Antonella Capriotti	Italy	13.67	x	13.83	x	13.69	14.01	14.01	NR
5	Helga Radtke	Germany	13.52	13.95	x	13.56	x	x	13.95	
6	Concepción Paredes	Spain	13.79	13.83	12.21	13.67	13.41	x	13.83	
7	Šárka Kašpárková	Czech Republic	13.81	x	13.64	13.11	x	13.80	13.81	NR
8	Eloína Echevarría	Cuba	x	13.35	13.39	x	13.67	13.77	13.77	NR
9	Anja Vokuhl	Germany	13.38	13.22	12.99				13.38	
10	Andrea Ávila	Argentina	13.13	13.35	x				13.35	
11	Sylvie Borda	France	12.90	12.49	x				12.90	
12	Flora Hyacinth	United States Virgin Islands	x	x	11.40				11.40	
