= Athletics at the 1996 Summer Olympics – Women's triple jump =

Women's triple jump at the Games of the XXVI Olympiad
- Pictogram for athletics
- Venue: Centennial Olympic Stadium
- Date: 29–31 July
- Competitors: 31 from 23 nations
- Winning distance: 15.33 OR

Medalists
1st place, gold medalist(s)		Inessa Kravets	Ukraine
2nd place, silver medalist(s)		Inna Lasovskaya	Russia
3rd place, bronze medalist(s)		Šárka Kašpárková	Czech Republic

These are the official results of the Women's Triple Jump event at the 1996 Summer Olympics in Atlanta, Georgia. There were a total number of 31 competitors, with one non-starter.

It took 14.22m to get into the final. The key players from the previous year's world championships which had rewritten the record books were all in attendance. World record holder Inessa Kravets put out a long first jump, but it wasn't measured as it was ruled a foul. The first round leader was Ren Ruiping with a 14.30m. The only other jumper over 14 meters in the first round was Sheila Hudson at 14.02m. The second round advanced the distances significantly. Inna Lasovskaya jumped 14.98m to take a commanding lead. Ashia Hansen jumped her best of the day 14.49m to pull into second, but in total, five women jumped over 14.40m in the second round. In the third round Šárka Kašpárková equalled Lasovskaya with a 14.98m and with a 14.45m in the second round, Kašpárková held the tiebreaker. Iva Prandzheva and Kravets both produced 14.84m's in the round to play in bronze medal territory, with Kravets holding the tiebreaker 14.40m from the second round. In the fourth round Lasovskaya and Kašpárková continued to spar, first Lasovskaya jumping 14.66m to take the tiebreaker edge, answered by Kašpárková's 14.69m. Prandzheva jumped 14.39m but still never got into third place. The fifth round settled the medals as Lasovskaya jumped 14.70m to edge ahead on the tiebreaker. Then Kravets bounded down the runway, almost making the pit on her step phase, landing at 15.33 m (50 ft 3 1/2 in), to date the second longest jump in history only to her world record.

Iva Prandzheva from Bulgaria, ranking 4th with 14.92, was disqualified because of doping.

== Results ==
=== Qualifying round ===
Rule: Qualifying standard 14.20 (Q) or at least 12 best qualified (q).

Rank	Group	Athlete	Nation	#1	#2	#3	Result	Notes
1	B	Inna Lasovskaya	Russia	14.75	—	—	14.75	Q
~~2~~	A	Iva Prandzheva	Bulgaria	~~x~~	~~14.61~~	—	~~14.61~~	Q
2	A	Olena Govorova	Ukraine	x	14.60	—	14.60	Q
3	B	Inessa Kravets	Ukraine	14.57	—	—	14.57	Q
4	A	Ren Ruiping	China	x	x	14.56	14.56	Q
5	B	Ashia Hansen	Great Britain	14.55	—	—	14.55	Q
6	A	Olga Vasdeki	Greece	14.13	14.48	—	14.48	Q
7	B	Šárka Kašpárková	Czech Republic	14.42	—	—	14.42	Q
8	A	Olena Khlusovych	Ukraine	14.38	—	—	14.38	Q
9	B	Sheila Hudson	United States	14.26	—	—	14.26	Q
10	A	Jeļena Blaževiča	Latvia	14.24	—	—	14.24	Q
11	B	Rodica Mateescu	Romania	13.85	14.22	—	14.22	Q
12	A	Anna Biryukova	Russia	13.81	13.94	14.19	14.19	
13	A	Galina Čisťaková	Slovakia	14.08	14.14	13.54	14.14	
14	A	Virge Naeris	Estonia	13.94	13.95	14.00	14.00	
15	A	Cynthea Rhodes	United States	x	13.95	13.88	13.95	
16	A	Barbara Lah	Italy	x	13.74	x	13.74	
17	A	Michelle Griffith	Great Britain	13.38	x	13.70	13.70	
18	B	Gundega Sproģe	Latvia	13.67	x	x	13.67	
19	A	Suzette Lee	Jamaica	13.64	13.65	x	13.65	
20	B	Natalya Kayukova	Russia	13.35	x	13.54	13.54	
21	B	Maria de Souza	Brazil	13.12	13.38	13.13	13.38	
22	B	Wang Xiangrong	China	x	13.06	13.32	13.32	
23	B	Heli Koivula	Finland	12.43	x	13.25	13.25	
24	A	Nicola Martial	Guyana	12.75	x	12.91	12.91	
25	A	Vera Bitanji	Albania	12.55	12.82	x	12.82	
26	B	Althea Gilharry	Belize	x	12.78	12.75	12.78	
27	B	Chantal Ouoba	Burkina Faso	12.40	12.19	12.24	12.40	
	A	Diana Orrange	United States	x	x	x	NM	
	B	Zita Bálint	Hungary	x	x	x	NM	
	B	Concepción Paredes	Spain	x	x	x	NM	
	B	Petra Laux-Lobinger	Germany	x	x	x	NM	
	B	Yamile Aldama	Cuba				DNS	

=== Final ===
Rank	Athlete	Nation	#1	#2	#3	#4	#5	#6	Result	Notes
1st place, gold medalist(s)	Inessa Kravets	Ukraine	x	14.40	14.84	x	15.33	14.75	15.33	
2nd place, silver medalist(s)	Inna Lasovskaya	Russia	x	14.98	x	14.66	14.70	14.21	14.98	
3rd place, bronze medalist(s)	Šárka Kašpárková	Czech Republic	x	14.45	14.98	14.69	x	14.48	14.98	
4	Ashia Hansen	Great Britain	13.61	14.49	13.75	14.35	14.24	14.30	14.49	
5	Olga Vasdeki	Greece	13.94	14.44	14.39	x	14.17	14.33	14.44	
6	Ren Ruiping	China	14.30	14.11	13.80	13.70	13.75	13.91	14.30	
7	Rodica Mateescu	Romania	x	13.92	14.21	14.07	13.68	x	14.21	
8	Jeļena Blaževiča	Latvia	13.98	14.12	13.88	Did not advance			14.12	
9	Olena Govorova	Ukraine	x	14.04	14.09	Did not advance			14.09	
10	Sheila Hudson	United States	14.02	13.91	13.69	Did not advance			14.02	
11	Olena Khlusovych	Ukraine	13.81	13.65	—	Did not advance			13.81	
DSQ	Iva Prandzheva	Bulgaria	x	x	14.84	14.39	x	14.92	14.92	DSQ for doping

== See also ==
- 1995 women's World Championships triple jump
- 1997 women's World Championships triple jump
