= 1991 IAAF World Indoor Championships – Women's triple jump =

The women's triple jump at the 1991 IAAF World Indoor Championships was held on 9 March. This event was held for the first time at the World Indoor Championships, and as it was a demonstration event, the medals won here did not count towards the total score in the medal table.

== Results ==
Rank	Name	Nationality	#1	#2	#3	#4	#5	#6	Result	Notes
1st place, gold medalist(s)	Inessa Kravets	Soviet Union	14.30	14.39	14.44	x	14.23	14.27	14.44	WR
2nd place, silver medalist(s)	Li Huirong	China	13.83	x	x	x	13.98	13.95	13.98	
3rd place, bronze medalist(s)	Sofiya Bozhanova	Bulgaria	13.45	x	13.62	x	13.35	x	13.62	NR
4	Tamara Malešev	Yugoslavia	13.27	13.35	13.19	13.27	13.19	13.30	13.35	
5	Ana Isabel Oliveira	Portugal	x	13.10	x	12.87	x	13.22	13.22	
6	Octavia Iacob	Romania	12.95	12.72	13.08	x	12.92	x	13.08	
7	Li Jing	China	13.05	12.89	12.95	12.56	x	13.06	13.06	PB
8	Diane Sommerville	Jamaica	12.52	12.85	12.66	12.89	12.84	12.84	12.89	
9	Robyne Johnson	United States	x	12.71	12.83				12.83	
10	Concepción Paredes	Spain	x	x	12.73				12.73	
11	Babett Fuchs	Germany	12.42	12.54	12.38				12.54	
