= Concepción Paredes =

Spanish triple jumper (1970–2019)

Personal information
- Nickname: Conchi
- Born: 19 July 1970 Palencia, Spain
- Died: 22 June 2019 (aged 48)
- Height: 1.74 m (5 ft 9 in)
- Weight: 67 kg (148 lb)

Sport
- Sport: Track and field
- Event: Triple jump
- Club: Larios, Madrid

María Concepción Paredes Tamayo (19 July 1970 – 22 June 2019) was a Spanish athlete who specialised in the triple jump. She represented her country at the 1996 Summer Olympics, as well as three outdoor and four indoor World Championships.

Her personal bests in the event are 14.30 metres outdoors (+1.8 m/s, Segovia 1994) and 14.09 metres indoors (Seville 1999). In addition, she has a long jump personal best of 6.30 metres (+1.4, León 1991).

== Competition record ==
Year	Competition	Venue	Position	Event	Notes
Representing Spain
1991	World Indoor Championships	Seville, Spain	10th	Triple jump	12.73 m
1992	European Indoor Championships	Genoa, Italy	8th	Triple jump	13.39 m
1993	World Indoor Championships	Toronto, Canada	6th	Triple jump	13.83 m
1993	World Championships	Stuttgart, Germany	14th (q)	Triple jump	13.38 m
1994	European Indoor Championships	Paris, France	17th (q)	Triple jump	13.47 m
1994	European Championships	Helsinki, Finland	9th	Triple jump	13.68 m
1995	World Indoor Championships	Barcelona, Spain	10th (q)	Triple jump	13.46 m
1995	World Championships	Gothenburg, Sweden	18th (q)	Triple jump	13.75 m
1996	European Indoor Championships	Stockholm, Sweden	13th (q)	Triple jump	13.47 m
1996	Olympic Games	Atlanta, United States	–	Triple jump	NM
1997	World Indoor Championships	Paris, France	18th (q)	Triple jump	13.26 m
1997	Mediterranean Games	Bari, Italy	8th	Triple jump	13.23 m
1998	European Indoor Championships	Valencia, Spain	16th (q)	Triple jump	13.12 m
1999	World Championships	Seville, Spain	–	Triple jump	NM
