= Xiangrong =

Xiangrong is a surname. Notable people with this surname include:

- Liu Xiangrong (born 1988), Chinese shot putter
- Wang Xiangrong (born 1972 or 1976), Chinese athlete
- Xiao Xiangrong (1910-1976), lieutenant general in the People's Liberation Army
