= 1996 European Athletics Indoor Championships – Women's triple jump =

The men's triple jump event at the 1996 European Athletics Indoor Championships was held in Stockholm Globe Arena on 8–9 March.

== Medalists ==
Gold	Silver	Bronze
Iva Prandzheva; Bulgaria	Šárka Kašpárková; Czech Republic	Olga Vasdeki; Greece

== Results ==
=== Qualification ===
Qualification performance: 13.85 (Q) or at least 12 best performers (q) advanced to the final.

Rank	Athlete	Nationality	#1	#2	#3	Result	Notes
1	Iva Prandzheva	Bulgaria	14.37			14.37	Q
2	Ashia Hansen	Great Britain	x	14.32		14.32	Q
3	Šárka Kašpárková	Czech Republic	14.25			14.25	Q
4	Olga Vasdeki	Greece	13.76	14.01		14.01	Q
5	Monica Toth	Romania	13.78	13.76	13.95	13.95	Q
6	Virge Naeris	Estonia	13.95			13.95	Q
7	Petra Lobinger	Germany	13.92			13.92	Q
8	Natalya Kayukova	Russia	x	13.87		13.87	Q
9	Yelena Govorova	Ukraine	13.73	13.81	13.78	13.81	q
10	Cristina Nicolau	Romania	13.80	x	13.39	13.80	q
11	Jeļena Blaževiča	Latvia	13.28	13.32	13.56	13.56	q
12	Anja Valant	Slovenia	x	x	13.53	13.53	q
13	Concepción Paredes	Spain	13.47	x	x	13.47	
14	Chukwuwete Olomina	Sweden	13.44	x	13.33	13.44	
15	Olga Boyko	Ukraine	12.67	13.40	13.17	13.40	
16	Tereza Marinova	Bulgaria	x	11.69	13.40	13.40	
17	Galina Chistyakova	Slovakia	13.39	13.08	13.32	13.39	
18	Sylvie Borda	France	12.86	13.19	13.29	13.29	
19	Silvija Mrakovčić	Croatia	x	12.78	13.04	13.04	
20	Manuela Schmid	Switzerland	x	12.98	12.94	12.98	
21	Claudia Vetsch	Switzerland	12.76	12.82	12.83	12.83	
22	Michelle Griffith	Great Britain	x	x	12.36	12.36	
	Antonella Capriotti	Italy	x	x	x	NM	

=== Final ===
Rank	Name	Nationality	#1	#2	#3	#4	#5	#6	Result	Notes
1st place, gold medalist(s)	Iva Prandzheva	Bulgaria	13.99	x	14.22	x	14.54	14.37	14.54	
2nd place, silver medalist(s)	Šárka Kašpárková	Czech Republic	14.17	14.27	14.33	x	14.50	x	14.50	
3rd place, bronze medalist(s)	Olga Vasdeki	Greece	13.93	x	14.23	x	14.30	14.15	14.30	
4	Natalya Kayukova	Russia	x	14.22	13.72	14.00	x	13.97	14.22	
5	Virge Naeris	Estonia	14.05	x	x	13.90	x	x	14.05	
6	Yelena Govorova	Ukraine	13.23	13.85	13.61	13.74	13.61	x	13.85	
7	Monica Toth	Romania	13.78	x	12.14	13.41	13.34	x	13.78	
8	Cristina Nicolau	Romania	x	13.56	13.68	x	13.31	13.20	13.68	
9	Petra Lobinger	Germany	x	13.39	13.66				13.66	
10	Jeļena Blaževiča	Latvia							13.46	
11	Anja Valant	Slovenia							13.35	
	Ashia Hansen	Great Britain							NM	
