= Zhanna Gureyeva =

Belarusian track and field athlete

Personal information
- Born: 10 June 1970 (age 56) Voronezh Oblast, Soviet Union

Sport
- Sport: Track and field
Medal record
Representing Belarus
Summer Universiade
Bronze medal – third place	1997 Catania	Triple jump

Zhanna Gureyeva (Belarusian: Жанна Гуреева; born 10 June 1970) is a Belarusian female former track and field athlete who competed in the triple jump. She was a three-time representative of her native country at the World Championships in Athletics, featuring in 1993, 1995 and 1997, and making the final on the latter two occasions. Her lifetime best of 14.35 m (47 ft 3/4 in) came in the qualifying round of the 1997 World Championships.

Her first international medal came at the 1998 European Cup, where she took bronze. She was also bronze medallist at the 1997 Summer Universiade. Gureyeva was a four-time national champion, winning at the Belarus Athletics Championships in 1995, 1997 and 1999, and indoors in 2002.

Born in Voronezh Oblast, she was invited to try out for athletics by a local coach, Alexander Sinkevich. She began training seriously with Eugene Rusakov. She studied sports at university and joined the main coach of her career, Valery Bunin, in 1987. Following her retirement from competitive athletics, she continued in the sports field as a professor at the Belarusian State University of Physical Training.

== International competitions ==
Year	Competition	Venue	Position	Event	Notes
1993	World Championships	Stuttgart, Germany	16th (q)	Triple jump	13.30 m
1995	European Cup	Villeneuve d'Ascq, France	3rd	Triple jump	14.25 m
1995	World Championships	Gothenburg, Sweden	7th	Triple jump	14.22 m
1997	Universiade	Catania, Italy	3rd	Triple jump	13.93 m
1997	World Championships	Athens, Greece	12th	Triple jump	13.59 m
1998	European Indoor Championships	Valencia, Spain	17th (q)	Triple jump	12.87 m

== National titles ==
- Belarus Athletics Championships
  - Triple jump: 1995, 1997, 1999
- Belarus Indoor Championships
  - Triple jump: 2002
