= Inna Lasovskaya =

Russian triple jumper (born 1969)

Medal record

Women's athletics

Representing Russia

European Championships
Silver medal – second place	1994 Helsinki	Triple jump

Inna Alexandrovna Lasovskaya (Russian: Инна Александровна Ласовская; born 17 December 1969) is a retired triple jumper from Russia. She won a gold medal at the 1994 European Athletics Indoor Championships, ahead of compatriot and world record holder Anna Biryukova. In 1996 she jumped past the 15-metre mark for the first time (15.08 in Madrid) and won an Olympic silver medal. In 1997 she won the World Indoor Championships, and the same year in Valencia she jumped 15.09 metres, which remains her personal best.

== International competitions ==
Representing Russia
Year	Competition	Venue	Position	Event	Result	Notes
1993	World Indoor Championships	Toronto, Canada	3rd	Triple jump	14.35 m	
1993	World Championships	Stuttgart, Germany	—	Triple jump	NM	
1994	European Indoor Championships	Paris, France	1st	Triple jump	14.88 m	
1994	European Championships	Helsinki, Finland	2nd	Triple jump	14.85 m	w (+3.1 m/s)
1995	World Championships	Gothenburg, Sweden	4th	Triple jump	14.90 m	
1996	Summer Olympics	Atlanta, United States	2nd	Triple jump	14.98 m	
1997	World Indoor Championships	Paris, France	1st	Triple jump	15.01 m	WL

== See also ==
- List of Olympic medalists in athletics (women)
- List of 1996 Summer Olympics medal winners
- List of IAAF World Indoor Championships medalists (women)
- List of European Athletics Championships medalists (women)
- List of European Athletics Indoor Championships medalists (women)
- Triple jump at the Olympics
