= Petra Lobinger =

German triple jumper (born 1967)

Personal information
- Nationality: German
- Born: 24 January 1967 (age 59) Weidenau, West Germany

Sport
- Sport: Athletics
- Event: Triple jump

Achievements and titles
- Personal best: Triple jump: 14.31 m (1997)

Petra Lobinger (née Laux; divorced Schneider; born 24 January 1967) is a German retired athlete who specialised in the triple jump. She represented her country at the 1996 Summer Olympics, as well as two World Championships, in 1993 and 1997. Her biggest success is the fifth place at the 1997 World Indoor Championships.

== Career ==
Her personal bests in the event are 14.31 metres outdoors (Mainz 1997) and 14.36 metres indoors (Paris 1997). The latter is a former national record which stood for almost 14 years, only being beaten in 2011 by Katja Demut.

In 1994 she married the former pole vaulter, Tim Lobinger (1972–2023), and had two children together. The couple divorced in 2003. Their son Lex-Tyger Lobinger is a professional footballer.

== Competition record ==
Year	Competition	Venue	Position	Event	Notes
Representing Germany
1993	Universiade	Buffalo, United States	6th	Triple jump	13.53 m
1993	World Championships	Stuttgart, Germany	18th (q)	Triple jump	13.22 m
1994	European Championships	Helsinki, Finland	19th (q)	Triple jump	13.18 m
1996	European Indoor Championships	Stockholm, Sweden	9th	Triple jump	13.66 m
1996	Olympic Games	Atlanta, United States	–	Triple jump	NM
1997	World Indoor Championships	Paris, France	5th	Triple jump	14.36 m
1997	World Championships	Athens, Greece	10th	Triple jump	13.86 m
1998	European Indoor Championships	Valencia, Spain	8th	Triple jump	14.02 m
