= Jeļena Blaževiča =

Latvian athlete

Personal information
- Born: 11 May 1970 (age 56) Riga, Soviet Union

Sport
- Sport: Track and field

Jeļena Blaževiča (born 11 May 1970) is a retired Latvian triple jumper. Her personal best jump was 14.55 metres, achieved in June 1996 in Riga.

== Achievements ==
| Year | Competition | Venue | Position | Event | Notes |
Representing Latvia
| 1993 | Universiade | Buffalo, United States | 8th | Long jump | 6.30 m |
| 1993 | World Championships | Stuttgart, Germany | 10th | Triple jump | 13.57 m |
| 1994 | European Championships | Helsinki, Finland | 22nd (q) | Triple jump | 13.02 m |
| 1995 | World Championships | Gothenburg, Sweden | 9th | Triple jump | 14.09 m |
| 1996 | European Indoor Championships | Stockholm, Sweden | 10th | Triple jump | 13.46 m |
| 1996 | Olympic Games | Atlanta, United States | 8th | Triple jump | 14.12 m |
| 1997 | World Championships | Athens, Greece | 32nd (q) | Long jump | 6.18 m |
| 1997 | World Championships | Athens, Greece | 7th | Triple jump | 14.06 m |
| 1998 | European Indoor Championships | Valencia, Spain | 11th | Triple jump | 13.49 m |
| 1998 | European Championships | Budapest, Hungary | 23rd (q) | Triple jump | 13.62 m |
