= Ren Ruiping =

Chinese triple jumper (born 1976)

Medal record

Women's athletics

Representing China

Asian Games
Gold medal – first place	1998 Bangkok	Triple jump

Asian Championships
Gold medal – first place	1993 Manila	Triple jump
Gold medal – first place	1995 Jakarta	Triple jump
Gold medal – first place	1998 Fukuoka	Triple jump

Ren Ruiping (Chinese: 任瑞萍; pinyin: Rén Ruìpíng; born February 1, 1976, in Shandong) is a Chinese female triple jumper. Ren set three world junior records in triple jump, and is a former Asian record holder with 14.66 metres. The record now belongs to Olga Rypakova of Kazakhstan with 15.25 metres.

== Achievements ==
Year	Competition	Venue	Position	Notes
Representing China
1993	Asian Championships	Manila, Philippines	1st	14.05 m
1994	World Junior Championships	Lisbon, Portugal	2nd	14.36 m
1994	World Cup	London, United Kingdom	3rd	13.84 m
1995	World Indoor Championships	Barcelona, Spain	3rd	14.37 m
1995	Asian Championships	Jakarta, Indonesia	1st	13.99 m
1995	World Championships	Gothenburg, Sweden	6th	14.25 m
1996	Olympic Games	Atlanta, United States	7th	14.30 m
1997	World Indoor Championships	Paris, France	11th	13.85 m
1997	East Asian Games	Busan, South Korea	1st	14.47 m
1997	World Championships	Athens, Greece	16th (q)	14.06 m
1998	Asian Championships	Fukuoka, Japan	1st	14.11 m
1998	World Cup	Johannesburg, South Africa	4th	14.04 m
1998	Asian Games	Bangkok, Thailand	1st	14.27 m
1999	World Indoor Championships	Maebashi, Japan	–	NM
1999	World Championships	Seville, Spain	16th (q)	13.90 m
2000	Olympic Games	Sydney, Australia	26th (q)	13.16 m
2001	East Asian Games	Osaka, Japan	1st	13.80 m

== Personal bests ==
- Long jump - 6.51 m (1996)
- Triple jump - 14.66 m (1997)
