= Althea Gilharry =

Belizean triple jumper

Personal information
- Nationality: Belizean
- Born: 12 January 1970 (age 56)

Sport
- Sport: Athletics
- Event: Triple jump

Althea Gilharry (born 12 January 1970) is a Belizean athlete. She competed in the women's triple jump at the 1996 Summer Olympics.
