= Li Huirong =

Chinese long and triple jumper

Personal information
- Born: April 14, 1964 (age 62)

Sport
- Sport: Track and field
Medal record
Representing China
World Indoor Championships
Silver medal – second place	1991 Seville	Triple jump
Summer Universiade
Gold medal – first place	1991 Sheffield	Triple jump
Asian Games
Bronze medal – third place	1982 New Delhi	Long jump

Li Huirong (Chinese: 李惠荣; pinyin: Lǐ Huìróng, born April 14, 1965) is a retired triple jumper from People's Republic of China, who set the first IAAF-recognized women's triple jump world record of 14.54 metres on August 25, 1990 at a meet in Sapporo, Japan. She claimed the bronze medal in the women's long jump at the 1982 Asian Games in New Delhi, India.

She won the silver medal at the 1991 IAAF World Indoor Championships, held in Seville, Spain, but the new event was a non-championship contest. She was the first ever winner of the triple jump competition at the Summer Universiade in 1991. The following year, she became the first winner of the event at the 1992 IAAF World Cup with a jump of 13.88 m to beat Galina Chistyakova.

Records
Preceded by (United States) Sheila Hudson	Women's Triple Jump World Record Holder; Not officially ratified by the IAAF; 1987-10-11 – 1989-07-02	Succeeded by (Soviet Union) Galina Chistyakova
Preceded by (Soviet Union) Galina Chistyakova	Women's Triple Jump World Record Holder; Officially ratified by the IAAF; 1990-08-25 – 1991-06-10	Succeeded by (Soviet Union) Inessa Kravets
