= Yolanda Chen =

Russian athlete

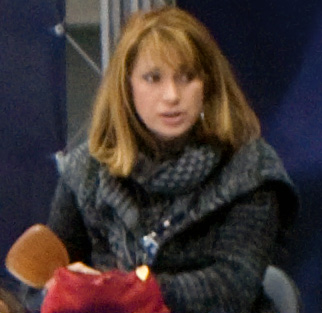

Personal information
- Born: July 26, 1961 (age 65) Moscow, Russian SFSR, USSR
Medal record
Representing Soviet Union
Summer Universiade
Gold medal – first place	1989 Duisburg	Long jump
European Indoor Championships
Silver medal – second place	1989 The Hague	Long jump
Representing Russia
World Championships
Silver medal – second place	1993 Stuttgart	Triple jump
World Indoor Championships
Gold medal – first place	1995 Barcelona	Triple jump
Silver medal – second place	1993 Toronto	Triple jump

Yolanda Chen (Russian: Иоланда Чен; born July 26, 1961, in Moscow) is a retired Russian athlete. She started as a pentathlete, but decided to specialize in long jump. In 1988, she achieved a personal best of 7.16 metres, a good result, but from 1992 she switched to triple jump instead, a relatively new event for women. Inspired by her father Yevgeny Chen, who was among the world elite in the 1950s, she managed to jump 13.72 metres in 1992. Her great-grandfather was Eugene Chen.

In 1993, she improved to 14.97 metres, a new outdoor record which would also remain her personal best. Her record was beaten at the World Championships the same year by fellow Russian Anna Biryukova, who jumped 15.09m. In 1995, Chen appeared at the World Indoor Championships and won the gold medal with 15.03 metres, a new world indoor record, beating the prior record of 14.47m. She finished 11th at the World Championships the same year.

Chen married pole vaulter Yevgeniy Bondarenko. She now works as a commentator for the Russian Eurosport.

In 2023, she suggested postponing the 2024 Summer Olympics to 2025 because of controversies surrounding Russia's participation.

== International competitions ==
Year	Competition	Venue	Position	Event	Result	Notes
Representing the Soviet Union
1983	Summer Universiade	Edmonton, Canada	5th	Long jump	6.52 m	
1989	European Indoor Championships	The Hague, Netherlands	2nd	Long jump	6.86 m	
1989	Summer Universiade	Duisburg, West Germany	1st	Long jump	6.72 m	
1990	European Championships	Split, Yugoslavia	5th	Long jump	6.90 m	wind: +0.8 m/s
Representing Russia
1993	World Indoor Championships	Toronto, Canada	2nd	Triple jump	14.36 m	
1993	World Championships	Stuttgart, Germany	2nd	Triple jump	14.70 m	
1994	European Championships	Helsinki, Finland	4th	Triple jump	14.48 m	w (+2.2 m/s)
1995	World Indoor Championships	Barcelona, Spain	1st	Triple jump	15.03 m	WR
1995	World Championships	Gothenburg, Sweden	11th	Triple jump	14.05 m	

== See also ==
- List of World Athletics Championships medalists (women)
- List of IAAF World Indoor Championships medalists (women)
- List of European Athletics Indoor Championships medalists (women)
