= Yevgeny Chen =

Russian triple jumper (1934–2026)

Yevgeny Bernardovich Chen (Russian: Евгений Бернардович Чен; 8 May 1934 – 11 June 2026) was a Russian triple jumper.

== Life and career ==
Chen was born on 8 May 1934, and was the grandson of Chinese diplomat, Evgeny Chen. From 1954 to 1962 he was a member of the USSR national team, participating in of the 1956 Olympic Games in Melbourne.

He died on 11 June 2026, aged 92.

His daughter was Yolanda Chen.
