= Anna Biryukova =

Russian athletics competitor

Medal record

Women's athletics

Representing Russia

European Championships
Gold medal – first place	1994 Helsinki	Triple jump

Anna Biryukova, née Anna Derevyankina, (Russian: Анна Бирюкова; born 27 September 1967 in Yekaterinburg, Sverdlovsk) is a retired female triple jumper from Russia.

In 1993 Biryukova won a gold medal at the World Championships by jumping 15.09 metres, a new world record. She reportedly believed she had the capability of jumping 16 metres, but in 1994 she didn't reach the 15 metre mark once, although she did become European champion that season. In 1995 she starred in the World Championships, and she almost reached old heights by jumping 15.08 metres. Women's triple jump had progressed, however, and she only managed a bronze medal behind Iva Prandzheva (15.15m) and Inessa Kravets, who jumped a world record of 15.50 metres up to Yulimar Rojas at 15.67m, the world record, was set during the 2020 Summer Olympics in Tokyo, Japan on August 1, 2021.

Anna Biryukova also competed in long jump from time to time, and her personal best is 6.64 metres.

== International competitions ==
Representing Russia
Year	Competition	Venue	Position	Event	Result	Notes
1993	World Championships	Stuttgart, Germany	1st	Triple jump	15.09	WR
1993	World Championships	Stuttgart, Germany	17th (q)	Long jump	6.31 m	
1994	European Indoor Championships	Paris, France	2nd	Triple jump	14.72 m	
1994	European Championships	Helsinki, Finland	1st	Triple jump	14.89 m	wind: +1.1 m/s
1994	World Cup	London, United Kingdom	1st	Triple jump	14.46 m	
1995	World Championships	Gothenburg, Sweden	3rd	Triple jump	15.08 m	
1996	Olympic Games	Atlanta, United States	13th (q)	Triple jump	14.19 m	
1997	World Championships	Athens, Greece	—	Triple jump	NM	

== See also ==
- List of World Athletics Championships medalists (women)
- List of European Athletics Championships medalists (women)
- List of European Athletics Indoor Championships medalists (women)
- List of people from Yekaterinburg

Records
Preceded by Yolanda Chen	Women's Triple Jump World Record Holder; 21 August 1993 – 10 August 1995	Succeeded by Inessa Kravets
