= Olga Vasdeki =

Greek triple jumper

Personal information
- Born: 26 September 1973 (age 52)

Sport
- Country: Greece
- Sport: Athletics
- Event(s): Triple jump Long jump

Achievements and titles
- Personal best(s): 14.67 m, 14.51 m (i); 6.60 m
Medal record
Women's athletics
Representing Greece
World Championships
Bronze medal – third place	1999 Seville	Triple jump
European Championships
Gold medal – first place	1998 Budapest	Triple jump
European Indoor Championships
Bronze medal – third place	1996 Stockholm	Triple jump

Olga Vasdeki (Greek: Όλγα Βασδέκη, [ˈolɣa vazˈðeci], born 26 September 1973 in Volos) is a Greek triple jumper.

She was the most successful Greek triple jumper and Greek record holder until 1998, when she won the gold medal at the European Championships in Budapest, being at the time just the second female Greek athlete to be crowned European Champion after Anna Verouli in 1982. The following year she won the bronze medal at the World Championships in Seville behind Paraskevi Tsiamita and Yamile Aldama. She is the younger sister of long jumper Spyridon Vasdekis.

She was named the Greek Female Athlete of the Year for 1998.

== Achievements ==
Year	Competition	Venue	Position	Notes
Representing Greece
1996	European Indoor Championships	Stockholm, Sweden	3rd	
1996	Olympic Games	Atlanta, United States	5th	
1997	World Championships	Athens, Greece	4th	14.62 m
1997	Mediterranean Games	Bari, Italy	1st	
1998	European Indoor Championships	Valencia, Spain	4th	14.29 m
1998	European Championships	Budapest, Hungary	1st	14.55 m
1998	World Cup	Johannesburg, South Africa	1st	14.64 m NR
1999	World Championships	Seville, Spain	3rd	14.61 m
2000	Olympic Games	Sydney, Australia	7th	14.15 m
2003	World Championships	Paris, France	12th	
2004	Olympic Games	Athens, Greece	11th	14.34 m
