= Wang Xiangrong =

Chinese triple jumper

Personal information
- Nationality: Chinese
- Born: 19 February 1972 (age 54) or 19 February 1976 (age 50)

Sport
- Sport: Athletics
- Event: Triple jump

Wang Xiangrong (born 19 February 1972 or 1976) is a Chinese athlete. She competed in the women's triple jump at the 1996 Summer Olympics.
