= Yelena Lebedenko =

Russian athletics competitor

Yelena Vladimirovna Lebedenko (Russian: Елена Владимировна Лебеденко; born 16 January 1971) is a retired Russian heptathlete and triple jumper.

== Career ==
She won the gold medal in the pentathlon at the 1996 European Indoor Championships; in the heptathlon she finished eighteenth at the 1995 World Championships and seventeenth at the 1996 Olympic Games.

She then changed event to the triple jump, where she finished sixth at the 1999 World Indoor Championships. Her personal best jump was 14.41 metres, achieved in May 1998 in Vilamoura.

Lebedenko represented Russia in the LWT television series International Gladiators held in Birmingham in 1995 and broadcast in the UK in 1996. She reached the semi-final stage where she was forced to retire injured.
