= Paraskevi Tsiamita =

Greek track and field athlete

Personal information
- Native name: Παρασκευή "Βούλα" Τσιαμήτα
- Nickname: Voula
- Born: 10 March 1972 (age 54) Volos, Greece

Sport
- Event(s): Triple jump Long jump

Achievements and titles
- Highest world ranking: 1st (1999)
- Personal best(s): 15.07 m, 14.63 m (i); 6.93 m
Medal record
World Championships
Gold medal – first place	1999 Seville	Triple jump

Paraskevi "Voula" Tsiamita (Greek: Παρασκευή Τσιαμήτα, [parasceˈvi tsjaˈmita], born 10 March 1972) is a Greek former track and field athlete who competed in long jump and triple jump.

She was born in Volos, on 10 March 1972. Her origins come from the nearby village of Sesklo, and she is of Aromanian descent.

In 1998 she improved her personal best in triple jump by approximately one metre, and became world champion in 1999 with a personal best jump of 15.07 metres. This was the national record until 2004, when Hrysopiyi Devetzi jumped 15.32 m at the Olympic Games.

Her personal best in long jump is 6.93 metres, achieved in August 1999 in Patras. This places her second in the all-time Greek performers list, only behind Niki Xanthou.

She was named the Greek Female Athlete of the Year for 1999.

Tsiamita retired in 2004 because of persistent injury problems.

== Achievements ==
Year	Competition	Venue	Position	Notes
1998	European Championships	Budapest, Hungary	9th	14.23 m
1999	World Indoor Championships	Maebashi, Japan	5th	14.63 m (NR)
1999	World Championships	Seville, Spain	1st	14.88 m
1999	IAAF Grand Prix Final	Munich, Germany	2nd	14.77 m
