= Sofiya Bozhanova =

Bulgarian athletics competitor

Sofiya Bozhanova (Bulgarian: София Божанова) (born 4 October 1967) is a retired long and triple jumper from Bulgaria. She set the world's best year performance in 1994, jumping 14.98 metres at a meet in Stara Zagora on 16 July 1994. She won the bronze medal at the 1991 IAAF World Indoor Championships, held in Seville, Spain, but the new event was a non-championship contest.

== Doping ==
Bozhanova tested positive for amphetamine at the 1994 European Athletics Championships and was subsequently banned from sports for 4 years.
