= Valérie Guiyoule =

French triple jumper

Personal information
- Other names: Valérie Sarant
- Born: 3 August 1972 (age 53) Paris, France
- Height: 175 cm (5 ft 9 in)
- Weight: 62 kg (137 lb)

Sport
- Country: France
- Sport: Athletics
- Event: Triple Jump

Valérie Guiyoule (born 3 August 1972 at Paris), also known as Valérie Sarant, is a former French athlete, who specialized in the triple jump.

== Biography ==
She won three French National Athletic Championships in the triple jump: one in Outdoor in 1995 and two Indoors in 1994 and 1995.

She twice improved the French Triple Jump record: 13.85 m on 8 June 1994 at Reims and 13.94 m on 8 July 1995 at Limoges.

=== Prize list ===
- French Athletic Championships:
  - winner of the triple jump 1995
- French Indoor Athletics Championships:
  - winner of the triple jump 1994 and 1995

=== Records ===
personal records
| Event | Performance | Location | Date |
|---|---|---|---|
| Triple jump | 13.98 m | | 1997 |
