= Gundega Sproģe =

Latvian triple jumper

Gundega Sproģe (born 12 February 1972) is a retired Latvian triple jumper.

She finished ninth at the 1997 World Championships. She also competed at the 1996 Olympic Games and the 1997 World Indoor Championships without reaching the final round.

Her personal best jump was 14.76 metres, achieved in June 1997 in Sheffield. This is the current Latvian record.

In 1999 Sproģe was disqualified for doping for two years.
