= Monica Toth =

Romanian triple jumper

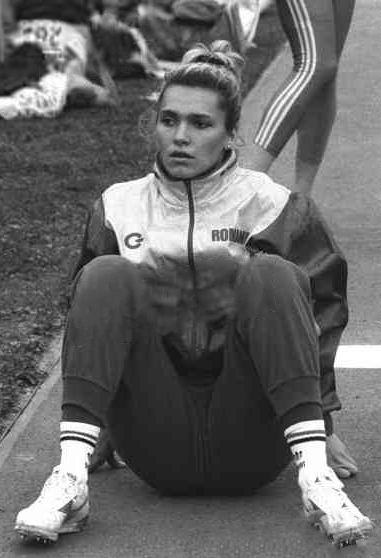
- Toth in 1993

Personal information
- Born: 7 March 1970 (age 56) Bucharest, Romania

Sport
- Sport: Athletics
- Event: Triple jump

Achievements and titles
- Personal best: 14.15 m (1995)
Medal record
Representing Romania
Summer Universiade
Bronze medal – third place	1993 Buffalo	Triple jump

Monica Toth (born 7 March 1970) is a Romanian retired triple jumper.

== Achievements ==
Year	Competition	Venue	Position	Notes
Representing Romania
1993	Summer Universiade	Buffalo, United States	3rd	Triple jump
1993	World Championships	Stuttgart, Germany	12th	Triple jump
1994	European Indoor Championships	Paris, France	9th	Triple jump
1996	European Indoor Championships	Stockholm, Sweden	7th	Triple jump
1998	European Indoor Championships	Valencia, Spain	6th	Long jump
