= Barbara Lah =

Italian triple jumper (born 1972)

Personal information
- Nationality: Italian
- Born: April 24, 1972 (age 54) Gorizia, Italy
- Height: 1.80 m (5 ft 11 in)
- Weight: 61 kg (134 lb)

Sport
- Country: Italy
- Sport: Athletics
- Event: Triple jump
- Club: Snam Gas Metano

Achievements and titles
- Personal best: Triple jump: 14.38 m (2003)
Medal record
Representing Italy
Summer Universiade
Bronze medal – third place	1995 Fukuoka	Triple jump

Barbara Lah (born 24 March 1972) is an Italian triple jumper, whose personal best jump is 14.38 metres, at the 2003 World Championships in Paris. In addition she has 6.12 m in the long jump.

== Biography ==
In 2012 sets the world record master, with the measure of 13.51, in the W40 category. In 2019 sets the world record master, with the measure of 12.30, in the W45 category.

== Achievements ==
Year	Competition	Venue	Position	Event	Notes
Representing Italy
1994	European Championships	Helsinki, Finland	12th (q)	Triple jump	13.59 m (wind: +0.3 m/s)
1995	World Indoor Championships	Barcelona, Spain	13th	Triple jump	12.88 m
1995	World Championships	Gothenburg, Sweden	8th	Triple jump	14.18 m
1995	Universiade	Fukuoka, Japan	3rd	Triple jump	13.85 m
2002	European Championships	Munich, Germany	10th	Triple jump	14.02 m
2003	World Championships	Paris, France	6th	Triple jump	14.38 m

== See also ==
- Italian all-time lists - Triple jump
- List of world records in masters athletics
- List of Italian records in masters athletics
