= Cynthea Rhodes =

American triple jumper

Personal information
- Born: September 30, 1968 (age 58) Terrell, Texas, United States

Sport
- Sport: Track and field

Cynthea Rhodes (born September 30, 1968) is a retired American triple jumper.

She finished twelfth at the 1995 World Indoor Championships and eleventh at the 1997 World Championships. She also competed at the 1996 Olympic Games without reaching the final.

Her personal best jump was 14.25 metres, achieved in the 1997 World Championships qualification round. The American record currently belongs to Tiombe Hurd with 14.45 metres.

Rhodes attended The University of Texas and remains on the indoor and outdoor Texas all-time records for triple jump, at No. 7 and No. 3, respectively.

On October 6, 2017, Rhodes was inducted into The University of Texas Athletics Hall of Honor.

During her professional career, Rhodes-Patterson medaled at every USATF Indoor Championship from 1993 to 1999, including two first-place finishes. She won gold at the 1996 U.S. Olympic trials and went on to compete in the 1996 Atlanta Olympic Games. At the 1997 IAAF World Championships, she set a personal best in the triple jump that still ranks her as the No. 6 American of all time.

Rhodes-Patterson got her MBA in 2003 and she works as corporate human resource manager for The Home Depot.

Rhodes-Patterson also volunteers on the Longhorn Athletics Advisory Council to ensure today's student athletes are given the same opportunities she was given.
