= Iva Prandzheva =

Bulgarian athlete (born 1972)

Iva Prandzheva (Bulgarian: Ива Пранджева, born 15 February 1972 in Plovdiv) is a former Bulgarian athlete who was successful in both long jump and triple jump. She had to retire from athletics in 2000 after she was caught doping for the second time and was subsequently banned for life.

Her best performance came at the 1995 World Championships where she won a silver medal jumping 15.18 metres, a personal best. The winner of the event, Inessa Kravets, set a new world record (15.50 metres) which stands until 2021.

Prandzheva competed at the 1996 Summer Olympics, but failed a blood drug test testing positive to Methandrostenolone and was banned for two years. She came back after the ban and qualified for the 2000 Summer Olympics, but was caught doping again. This time she tested positive for the anabolic steroid Nandrolone and she was subsequently banned from sports for life.

She competed in Survivor BG 2009 and was both the Runner - Up and Main Antagonist.

== Achievements ==
Year	Competition	Venue	Position	Event	Notes
Representing Bulgaria
1990	World Junior Championships	Plovdiv, Bulgaria	1st	Long jump	6.53 m (wind: +1.3 m/s)
1993	World Championships	Stuttgart, Germany	3rd	Triple jump	14.23 m
1994	European Championships	Helsinki, Finland	8th	Long jump	6.56 m (wind: 1.1 m/s)
1994	European Championships	Helsinki, Finland	—	Triple jump	NM
1995	World Indoor Championships	Barcelona, Spain	2nd	Triple jump	14.71 m
1995	World Championships	Gothenburg, Sweden	2nd	Triple jump	15.18 m
1996	European Indoor Championships	Stockholm, Sweden	1st	Triple jump	14.54 m
1996	Olympic Games	Atlanta, United States	DSQ (steroids)	Triple jump	
1999	World Indoor Championships	Maebashi, Japan	2nd	Triple jump	14.94 m
1999	World Indoor Championships	Maebashi, Japan	3rd	Long jump	6.78 m
2000	European Indoor Championships	Ghent, Belgium	3rd	Triple jump	14.63 m
2000	European Indoor Championships	Ghent, Belgium	3rd	Long jump	6.80 m

== See also ==
- List of sportspeople sanctioned for doping offences
