= Betty Lise =

French triple jumper

Personal information
- Born: 5 September 1972 (age 53) Fort de France, Martinique
- Height: 188 cm (6 ft 2 in)
- Weight: 73 kg (161 lb)

Sport
- Country: France; Martinique
- Sport: Athletics
- Event: Triple jump
Medal record
Women's athletics
Representing France
Mediterranean Games
Silver medal – second place	1997 Bari	Triple jump
Representing Martinique
CARIFTA Games Junior (U20)
Bronze medal – third place	1990 Kingston	100m hurdles
CARIFTA Games Youth (U17)
Bronze medal – third place	1988 Kingston	Long Jump

Betty Lise (born 5 September 1972 in Fort de France, Martinique) is a retired French triple jumper. She formerly represented Martinique in the CARIFTA Games, a Caribbean regional competition.

She finished ninth at the 1997 World Indoor Championships, eighth at the 1997 World Championships, second at the 1997 Mediterranean Games and sixth at the 1998 European Indoor Championships, the latter in a new national indoor record of 14.26 metres.

Her personal best jump was 14.50 metres, achieved in August 1997 in Athens and setting the French record in the process. Her national indoor record was broken by Teresa Nzola Meso Ba who jumped 14.69 metres at the 2007 European Indoor Championships.
