= Inessa Kravets =

Soviet and Ukrainian triple and long jumper

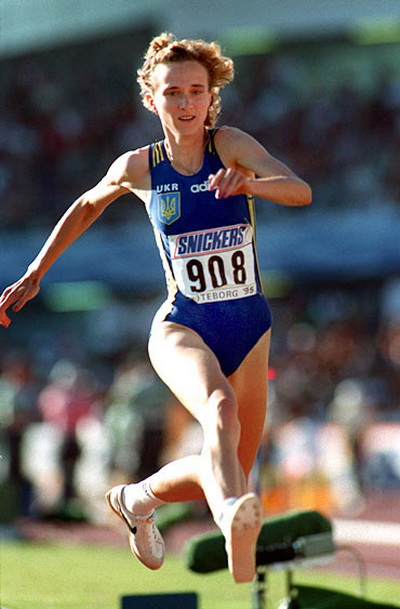

Personal information
- Native name: Інеса Миколаївна Кравець
- Born: Inessa Mykolayivna Shulyak; 5 October 1966 (age 59) Dnipropetrovsk, Ukrainian SSR, Soviet Union

Sport
- Country: Ukraine
- Sport: Women's athletics
- Events: Triple jump Long jump
Medal record
Senior level
Event	1st	2nd	3rd
Olympic Games	1	1	0
World Championships	1	0	0
World Indoor Championships	2	1	1
European Championships	0	1	1
European Indoor Championships	1	0	1
Grand Prix Final	1	3	1
Goodwill Games	1	0	0
Summer Universiade	1	0	0
IAAF World Cup	1	0	0
European Cup	0	0	1
Total	9	6	5
Women's athletics
Representing Ukraine
Olympic Games
Gold medal – first place	1996 Atlanta	Triple jump
World Championships
Gold medal – first place	1995 Gothenburg	Triple jump
World Indoor Championships
Gold medal – first place	1993 Toronto	Triple jump
Silver medal – second place	2003 Birmingham	Long jump
Bronze medal – third place	1993 Toronto	Long jump
European Championships
Silver medal – second place	1994 Helsinki	Long jump
Bronze medal – third place	1994 Helsinki	Triple jump
European Indoor Championships
Bronze medal – third place	1994 Paris	Long jump
IAAF World Cup
Gold medal – first place	1994 London	Long jump
European Cup
Bronze medal – third place	1993 Rome	Triple jump
IAAF Grand Prix Final
Gold medal – first place	1996 Milan	Long jump
Silver medal – second place	1994 Paris	Long jump
Silver medal – second place	1995 Fontvielle	Triple jump
Representing the Unified Team
Olympic Games
Silver medal – second place	1992 Barcelona	Long jump
European Indoor Championships
Gold medal – first place	1992 Genoa	Triple jump
IAAF Grand Prix Final
Bronze medal – third place	1992 Turin	Long jump
Representing Soviet Union
World Indoor Championships
Gold medal – first place	1991 Seville	Triple jump
Goodwill Games
Gold medal – first place	1990 Seattle	Long jump
Summer Universiade
Gold medal – first place	1991 Sheffield	Long jump
IAAF Grand Prix Final
Silver medal – second place	1990 Athens	Long jump

Inessa Mykolayivna Kravets (née Shulyak, Ukrainian: Інеса Миколаївна Кравець; born 5 October 1966) is a Ukrainian former triple jumper and long jumper. She was among the most prominent female triple jumpers in her era and was the world record holder until the 2021 Olympics, when Yulimar Rojas broke her record. Her record was one of the most durable in women's athletics.

== Career ==
Born in Dnipropetrovsk, her breakthrough in the triple jump came in 1991 when she broke the world record with a clearance of 14.95 metres in June. Her first major medals came in 1992. At the inaugural appearance of the women's triple jump at the 1992 European Athletics Indoor Championships she won the gold medal. Later that year at the 1992 Summer Olympics she claimed the long jump silver as part of the Unified Team.

She followed this with a gold medal at the first women's triple jump at the 1993 IAAF World Indoor Championships, but due to a doping ban she did not compete at the debut of the event at the 1993 World Championships in Athletics, where Russia's Anna Biryukova took the title. In 1994 she won the long jump at the 1994 IAAF World Cup and doubled up at the 1994 European Athletics Championships to take long jump silver and triple jump bronze.

She jumped the world record at the 1995 World Championships in Gothenburg with 15.50 metres after studying a picture of Jonathan Edwards. The following year she won the Olympic gold medal at the 1996 Atlanta Olympics, becoming the first ever women's champion in the triple jump.

== Ban and suspension ==
Twice, Kravets was caught breaking international rules regarding performance-enhancing substances. In 1993, Kravets was given a suspension of three months for use of stimulants. Then Kravets was suspended for two years in July 2000 after testing positive for a performance-enhancing steroid.

== See also ==
- List of sportspeople sanctioned for doping offences

Records
Preceded by (China) Li Huirong	Women's Triple Jump World Record Holder; 10 June 1991 – 21 August 1993	Succeeded by (Russia) Anna Biryukova
Preceded by (Russia) Anna Biryukova	Women's Triple Jump World Record Holder; 10 August 1995 – 1 August 2021	Succeeded by (Venezuela) Yulimar Rojas
