= Rodica Mateescu =

Romanian triple jumper

Medal record

Women's athletics

Representing Romania

World Championships
Silver medal – second place	1997 Athens	Triple jump

Rodica Mateescu (born Rodica Petrescu on 13 March 1971 in Bucharest) is a former triple jumper from Romania. Having set a personal best of 15.16 in 1997, she placed fourth at the 1997 IAAF World Indoor Championships and won a silver medal at the 1997 World Championships. The same year she placed third at the Grand Prix Final in Fukuoka.

She has been banned for life from the Olympics by the Romanian Olympic Committee (COR), after she tested positive for nandrolone in May 2000 during a training session in the Romanian Black Sea port of Constanta.
