= Triple jump =

Track and field event

Athletics Triple jump
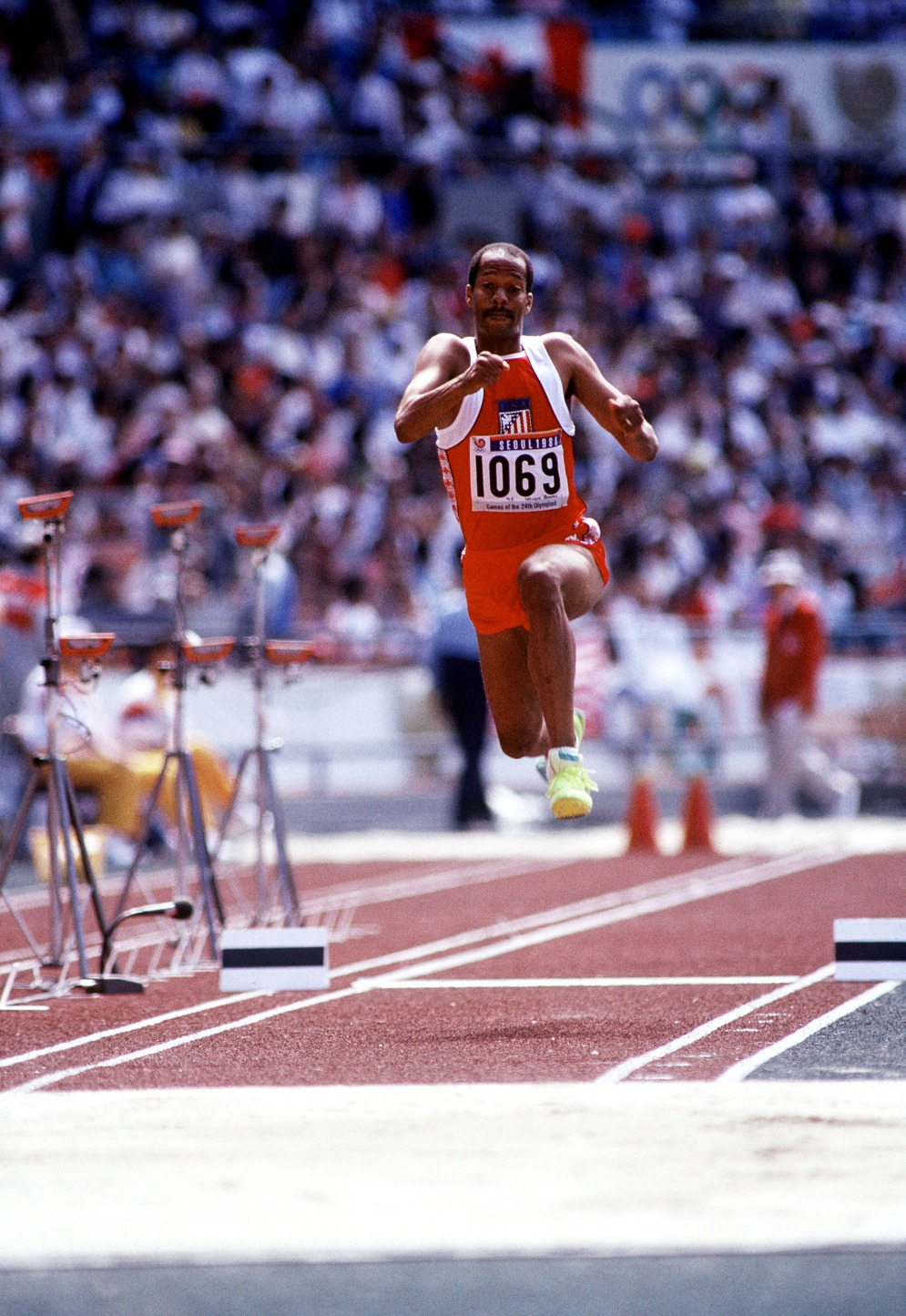
- Former world record holder Willie Banks during the 1988 Summer Olympics in Seoul, South Korea

World records
- Men: (United Kingdom) Jonathan Edwards 18.29 m (60 ft 0 in) (1995)
- Women: (Venezuela) Yulimar Rojas 15.74 m (51 ft 7 1/2 in) i (2022)

Olympic records
- Men: (United States) Kenny Harrison 18.09 m (59 ft 4 in) (1996)
- Women: (Venezuela) Yulimar Rojas 15.67 m (51 ft 4 3/4 in) (2021)

World Championship records
- Men: (United Kingdom) Jonathan Edwards 18.29 m (60 ft 0 in) (1995)
- Women: (Ukraine) Inessa Kravets 15.50 m (50 ft 10 in) (1995)

International University Sports Federation – Gwangju 2015 – Men's Triple Jump Final, Dmitry Sorokin (RUS 17.29) wins gold.

The triple jump, sometimes referred to as the hop, step and jump or the hop, skip and jump, is a track and field event, similar to long jump. As a group, the two events are referred to as the "horizontal jumps". The competitor runs down the track and performs a hop, a bound and then a jump into the sand pit. The triple jump was inspired by accounts of lengthy jumps at the ancient Olympic Games and has been a modern Olympics event since the Games' inception in 1896.

According to World Athletics rules, "the hop shall be made so that an athlete lands first on the same foot as that from which he has taken off; in the step he shall land on the other foot, from which, subsequently, the jump is performed."

The male world record holder is Jonathan Edwards of Great Britain, with a distance of 18.29 m (60 ft 0 in). The female world record holder is Yulimar Rojas of Venezuela, with a distance of 15.74 m (51 ft 7 1/2 in).

== History ==
Historical sources on the ancient Olympic Games occasionally mention jumps of 15 metres or more. This led sports historians to conclude that these must have been a series of jumps, thus providing the basis for the triple jump. However, there is no evidence for the triple jump being included in the ancient Olympic Games, and the recorded extraordinary distances may be due to the artistic license of the authors of victory poems, rather than attempts to report accurate results.

The triple jump was a part of the inaugural modern Olympics in 1896 in Athens, although at the time it consisted of two hops on the same foot and then a jump. The first modern Olympic champion, James Connolly, was a triple jumper. Early Olympics also included the standing triple jump, although this has since been removed from the Olympic program and is rarely performed in competition today. The women's triple jump was introduced into the Atlanta Olympics in 1996.

In Irish mythology the geal-ruith (triple jump) was an event contested in the ancient Irish Tailteann Games as early as 1829 BC.

== Technique ==
=== Approach ===
The approach is one of the most important parts of an athlete's jump. The athlete sprints down a runway to a takeoff mark, from which the triple jump is measured. The takeoff mark is commonly either a piece of wood or similar material embedded in the runway, or a rectangle painted on the runway surface. In modern championships, a strip of plasticine, tape, or modeling clay is attached to the far edge of the board to record athletes overstepping or "scratching" the mark, defined by the trailing edge of the board. These boards are placed at different places on the runway depending on how far the athlete can jump. Typically the boards are set 40 feet (12 m), 32 feet (9.8 m), and 24 feet (7.3 m) from the pit. These are the most common boards seen at the high school and junior levels, but boards can be placed anywhere on the runway. There are three phases of the triple jump: the "hop" phase, the "bound" or "step" phase, and the "jump" phase. They all play an important role in the jump itself. These three phases are executed in one continuous sequence. The athlete has to maintain a good speed through each phase. They should also try to stay consistent to avoid fouls.

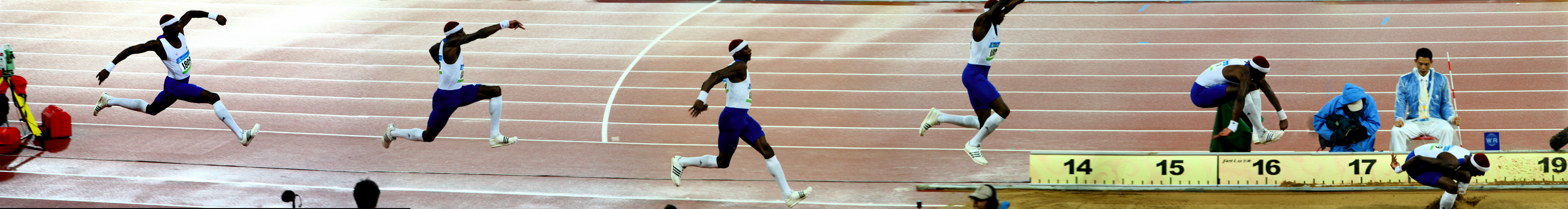
Phases of Phillips Idowu jumping at the 2008 Summer Olympics

=== Hop ===
The hop begins with the athlete jumping from the take-off board on one leg, which for descriptive purposes, will be the right leg. Precise placement of the foot on the take-off is important for the athlete to avoid a foul. The objective of the first phase is to hop out, with athletes focusing all momentum forward. The hop landing phase is very active, involving a powerful backward "pawing" action of the right leg, with the right take-off foot landing heel first on the runway.

=== Step ===
The hop landing also marks the beginning of the step phase, where the athlete utilizes the backward momentum of the right leg to immediately execute a powerful jump forward and upwards, the left leg assisting the take-off with a hip flexion thrust similar to a bounding motion. This leads to the step-phase mid-air position, with the right take-off leg trailing flexed at the knee, and the left leg now leading flexed at the hip and knee. The jumper then holds this position for as long as possible, before extending the knee of the leading left leg and then immediately beginning a powerful backward motion of the whole left leg, again landing on the runway with a powerful backward pawing action. The takeoff leg should be fully extended with the drive leg thigh just below parallel to the ground. The takeoff leg stays extended behind the body with the heel held high. The drive leg extends with a flexed ankle and snaps downward for a quick transition into the jump phase. The athlete tries to take the farthest step they can while maintaining balance and control, using techniques such as pulling their leg up as high as possible.

=== Jump ===
The step landing forms the take-off of the final phase (the jump), where the athlete utilizes the backward force from the left leg to take off again. The jump phase is very similar to the long jump although most athletes have lost too much speed by this time to manage a full hitch kick, and mostly used is a hang or sail technique.

When landing in the sand-filled pit, the jumper should aim to avoid sitting back on landing or placing either hand behind the feet. The sandpit usually begins 13m from the take-off board for male international competition or 11m from the board for international female and club-level male competition. Each phase of the triple jump should get progressively higher, and there should be a regular rhythm to the three landings.

=== Foul ===
A "foul", also known as a "scratch", or missed jump, occurs when a jumper oversteps the takeoff mark, misses the pit entirely, does not use the correct foot sequence throughout the phases, or does not perform the attempt in the allotted amount of time (usually about 90 seconds). When a jumper "scratches", the seated official will raise a red flag, and the jumper who was "on deck", or up next, prepares to jump.

It shall not be considered a foul if an athlete while jumping, should touch or scrape the ground with his/her "sleeping leg". Also called a "scrape foul", "sleeping leg" touch violations were ruled as fouls before the mid-1980s. The IAAF changed the rules following outrage at the 1980 Summer Olympics in Moscow when Soviet field officials in the men's triple jump final ruled as foul eight of the twelve jumps made by two leading competitors (from Brazil and Australia) thus helping two Soviet jumpers win the gold and silver medals.

== Records ==
- Updated 21 May 2026.

Area	Men				Women			
Area	Mark	Wind (m/s)	Season	Athlete	Mark	Wind (m/s)	Season	Athlete
World	18.29 m (60 ft 0 in)	+1.3	1995	Jonathan Edwards (GBR)	15.74 m (51 ft 7 1/2 in) i		2022	Yulimar Rojas (VEN)
Area records
Africa (records)	18.07 m (59 ft 3 1/4 in) i		2021	Hugues Fabrice Zango (BUR)	15.39 m (50 ft 5 3/4 in)	+0.5	2008	Françoise Mbango Etone (CMR)
Asia (records)	17.68 m (58 ft 0 in)	+1.0	2025	Wu Ruiting (CHN)	15.25 m (50 ft 1/4 in)	+1.7	2010	Olga Rypakova (KAZ)
Europe (records)	18.29 m (60 ft 0 in)	+1.3	1995	Jonathan Edwards (GBR)	15.50 m (50 ft 10 in)	+0.9	1995	Inessa Kravets (UKR)
North, Central America and Caribbean (records)	18.21 m (59 ft 8 3/4 in)	+0.2	2015	Christian Taylor (USA)	15.29 m (50 ft 1 3/4 in)	+0.3	2003	Yamilé Aldama (CUB)
Oceania (records)	17.46 m (57 ft 3 1/4 in)	+1.7	1982	Ken Lorraway (AUS)	14.04 m (46 ft 3/4 in)	+1.8	2003	Nicole Mladenis (AUS)
South America (records)	17.90 m (58 ft 8 1/2 in)	+0.4	2007	Jadel Gregório (BRA)	15.74 m (51 ft 7 1/2 in) i		2022	Yulimar Rojas (VEN)

== All-time top 25 ==
Outdoor tables show data for two definitions of "Top 25" - the top 25 triple jump marks and the top 25 athletes:
- denotes top performance for athletes in the top 25 triple jump marks
- denotes lesser performances, still in the top 25 triple jump marks, by repeat athletes
- denotes top performance (only) for other top 25 athletes who fall outside the top 25 triple jump marks

- As of August 2026.

=== Men (outdoor) ===
Ath.#	Perf.#	Mark	Wind (m/s)	Athlete	Nation	Date	Place	Ref.
1	1	18.29 m (60 ft 0 in)	+1.3	Jonathan Edwards	Great Britain	7 August 1995	Gothenburg	
2	2	18.21 m (59 ft 8 3/4 in)	+0.2	Christian Taylor	United States	27 August 2015	Beijing	
3	3	18.18 m (59 ft 7 1/2 in)	−0.3	Jordan Díaz	Spain	11 June 2024	Rome	
4	4	18.15 m (59 ft 6 1/2 in)	+1.7	Andy Díaz	Italy	15 August 2026	Birmingham	
5	5	18.14 m (59 ft 6 in)	+0.4	Will Claye	United States	29 June 2019	Long Beach	
	6	18.11 m (59 ft 4 3/4 in)	+0.8	Taylor #2		27 May 2017	Eugene	
6	7	18.09 m (59 ft 4 in)	−0.4	Kenny Harrison	United States	27 July 1996	Atlanta	
7	8	18.08 m (59 ft 3 3/4 in)	±0.0	Pedro Pichardo	Cuba	28 May 2015	Havana	
	9	18.06 m (59 ft 3 in)	+0.8	Pichardo #2		15 May 2015	Doha	
	9	18.06 m (59 ft 3 in)	+1.1	Taylor #3		9 July 2015	Lausanne	
	9	18.06 m (59 ft 3 in)	+0.4	Claye #2		24 August 2019	Paris	
8	12	18.04 m (59 ft 2 in)	+0.3	Teddy Tamgho	France	18 August 2013	Moscow	
	12	18.04 m (59 ft 2 in)	+0.8	Taylor #4		15 May 2015	Doha	
	12	18.04 m (59 ft 2 in)	−0.6	Pichardo #3		11 June 2024	Rome	
	15	18.01 m (59 ft 1 in)	+0.4	Edwards #3		9 July 1998	Oslo	
	16	18.00 m (59 ft 1/2 in)	+1.3	Edwards #4		27 August 1995	London	
	17	17.99 m (59 ft 1/4 in)	+0.5	Edwards #5		23 August 1998	Budapest	
	17	17.99 m (59 ft 1/4 in)	+1.8	Pichardo #4		9 July 2015	Lausanne	
	19	17.98 m (58 ft 11 3/4 in)	+1.8	Edwards #6		18 July 1995	Salamanca	
	19	17.98 m (58 ft 11 3/4 in)	+1.2	Tamgho #2		12 June 2010	New York City	
	19	17.98 m (58 ft 11 3/4 in)	±0.0	Pichardo #5		5 August 2021	Tokyo	
9	22	17.97 m (58 ft 11 1/4 in)	+1.5	Willie Banks	United States	16 June 1985	Indianapolis	
	23	17.96 m (58 ft 11 in)	+0.1	Taylor #5		4 September 2011	Deagu	
	23	17.96 m (58 ft 11 in)	−0.4	Pichardo #6		4 June 2015	Rome	
	25	17.95 m (58 ft 10 1/2 in)	+0.6	Pichardo #7		4 May 2018	Doha	
	25	17.95 m (58 ft 10 1/2 in)	+0.3	Pichardo #8		23 July 2022	Eugene	
10		17.92 m (58 ft 9 1/2 in)	+1.6	Khristo Markov	Bulgaria	31 August 1987	Rome	
10		17.92 m (58 ft 9 1/2 in)	+1.9	James Beckford	Jamaica	20 May 1995	Odessa	
12		17.90 m (58 ft 8 1/2 in)	+1.0	Vladimir Inozemtsev	Soviet Union	20 June 1990	Bratislava	
12		17.90 m (58 ft 8 1/2 in)	+0.4	Jadel Gregório	Brazil	20 May 2007	Belém	
14		17.89 m (58 ft 8 1/4 in) A	±0.0	João Carlos de Oliveira	Brazil	15 October 1975	Mexico City	
15		17.87 m (58 ft 7 1/2 in)	+1.7	Mike Conley	United States	27 June 1987	San Jose	
15		17.87 m (58 ft 7 1/2 in)	+1.3	Jaydon Hibbert	Jamaica	13 May 2023	Baton Rouge	
17		17.86 m (58 ft 7 in)	+1.3	Charles Simpkins	United States	2 September 1985	Kobe	
18		17.85 m (58 ft 6 3/4 in)	±0.0	Yoelbi Quesada	Cuba	8 August 1997	Athens	
19		17.82 m (58 ft 5 1/2 in)	+0.2	Hugues Fabrice Zango	Burkina Faso	6 July 2021	Székesfehérvár	
20		17.81 m (58 ft 5 in)	+1.0	Marian Oprea	Romania	5 July 2005	Lausanne	
20		17.81 m (58 ft 5 in)	+0.1	Phillips Idowu	Great Britain	29 July 2009	Barcelona	
22		17.79 m (58 ft 4 1/4 in)	+1.4	Christian Olsson	Sweden	22 August 2004	Athens	
23		17.78 m (58 ft 4 in)	+1.0	Nikolay Musiyenko	Soviet Union	7 June 1986	Leningrad	
23		17.78 m (58 ft 4 in)	+0.8	Melvin Lister	United States	17 July 2004	Havana	
25		17.77 m (58 ft 3 1/2 in)	+1.0	Aleksandr Kovalenko	Soviet Union	18 July 1987	Bryansk	

==== Ancillary marks ====
Jumps made en route to final marks that would be top 25 performances:

- Jonathan Edwards also jumped 18.16 (+1.3) in Gothenburg, Sweden on 7 August 1995.
- Christian Taylor also jumped 18.02 (+0.8) in Lausanne, Switzerland on 9 July 2015.
- Kenny Harrison also jumped 17.99 (−0.1) in Atlanta, Georgia on 27 July 1996.
- Jordan Díaz also jumped 17.96 (−0.3) in Rome, Italy on 11 June 2024.

==== Assisted marks ====
Any performance with a following wind of more than 2.0 metres per second is not counted for record purposes. Below is a list of wind-assisted jumps (equal or superior to 17.77 m). Only the best assisted mark that is superior to the legal best is shown:

- Jonathan Edwards jumped 18.43 (+2.4) in Villeneuve-d'Ascq, France on 25 June 1995.
- Willie Banks jumped 18.20 (+5.2) in Indianapolis, Indiana on 16 July 1988.
- Mike Conley jumped 18.17 (+2.1) in Barcelona, Spain on 3 August 1992.
- Yoelbi Quesada jumped 17.97 (+7.5) in Madrid, Spain on 20 June 1995.
- Charles Simpkins jumped 17.93 (+5.2) in Indianapolis, Indiana on 16 July 1988.
- Christian Olsson jumped 17.92 (+3.4) in Gateshead, United Kingdom on 13 June 2003.
- Denis Kapustin jumped 17.86 (+5.7) in Seville, Spain on 5 June 1994.
- Nelson Évora jumped 17.82 (+2.5) in Seixal, Portugal on 26 June 2009.
- Keith Connor jumped 17.81 (+4.6) in Brisbane, Australia on 9 October 1982.

==== Annulled marks ====
- Lazaro Betancourt jumped 17.78 (+0.6) in Havana, Cuba on 15 June 1986. This performance was annulled after he failed a drug test.

=== Women (outdoor) ===
Ath.#	Perf.#	Mark	Wind (m/s)	Athlete	Nation	Date	Place	Ref.
1	1	15.67 m (51 ft 4 3/4 in)	+0.7	Yulimar Rojas	Venezuela	1 August 2021	Tokyo	
	2	15.52 m (50 ft 11 in)	+0.6	Rojas #2		26 August 2021	Lausanne	
2	3	15.50 m (50 ft 10 in)	+0.9	Inessa Kravets	Ukraine	10 August 1995	Gothenburg	
	4	15.48 m (50 ft 9 1/4 in)	+0.3	Rojas #3		9 September 2021	Zürich	
	5	15.47 m (50 ft 9 in)	+1.9	Rojas #4		18 July 2022	Eugene	
	6	15.43 m (50 ft 7 1/4 in)	+0.7	Rojas #5		22 May 2021	Andújar	
	7	15.41 m (50 ft 6 1/2 in)	+1.5	Rojas #6		6 September 2019	Andújar	
3	8	15.39 m (50 ft 5 3/4 in)	+0.5	Françoise Mbango Etone	Cameroon	17 August 2008	Beijing	
	9	15.37 m (50 ft 5 in)	−0.6	Rojas #7		5 October 2019	Doha	
	10	15.35 m (50 ft 4 1/4 in)	+1.2	Rojas #8		16 September 2023	Eugene	
4	11	15.34 m (50 ft 3 3/4 in)	−0.5	Tatyana Lebedeva	Russia	4 July 2005	Heraklion	
	12	15.33 m (50 ft 3 1/2 in)	−0.1	Kravets #2		31 July 1996	Atlanta	
	12	15.33 m (50 ft 3 1/2 in)	+1.2	Lebedeva #2		6 July 2004	Lausanne	
	14	15.32 m (50 ft 3 in)	+0.5	Lebedeva #3		9 September 2000	Yokohama	
5	14	15.32 m (50 ft 3 in)	+0.9	Hrysopiyi Devetzi	Greece	21 August 2004	Athens	
6	16	15.31 m (50 ft 2 3/4 in)	±0.0	Caterine Ibargüen	Colombia	18 July 2014	Monaco	
	16	15.31 m (50 ft 2 3/4 in)	−0.2	Rojas #9		26 August 2022	Lausanne	
	18	15.30 m (50 ft 2 1/4 in)	+0.5	Mbango Etone #2		23 August 2004	Athens	
7	19	15.29 m (50 ft 1 3/4 in)	+0.3	Yamilé Aldama	Cuba	11 July 2003	Rome	
	20	15.28 m (50 ft 1 1/2 in)	+0.3	Aldama #2		2 August 2004	Linz	
8	20	15.28 m (50 ft 1 1/2 in)	+0.9	Yargelis Savigne	Cuba	31 August 2007	Osaka	
	20	15.28 m (50 ft 1 1/2 in)	−0.2	Rojas #10		8 September 2022	Zürich	
	23	15.27 m (50 ft 1 in)	+1.2	Aldama #3		8 August 2003	London	
	24	15.25 m (50 ft 1/4 in)	−0.8	Lebedeva #4		10 August 2001	Edmonton	
	24	15.25 m (50 ft 1/4 in)	−0.1	Devetzi #2		23 August 2004	Athens	
9	24	15.25 m (50 ft 1/4 in)	+1.7	Olga Rypakova	Kazakhstan	4 September 2010	Split	
9	24	15.25 m (50 ft 1/4 in)	+1.8	Thea LaFond	Dominica	26 June 2026	Zagreb	
11		15.20 m (49 ft 10 1/4 in)	±0.0	Šárka Kašpárková	Czech Republic	4 August 1997	Athens	
11		15.20 m (49 ft 10 1/4 in)	−0.3	Tereza Marinova	Bulgaria	24 September 2000	Sydney	
13		15.18 m (49 ft 9 1/2 in)	+0.3	Iva Prandzheva	Bulgaria	10 August 1995	Gothenburg	
14		15.16 m (49 ft 8 3/4 in)	+0.1	Rodica Mateescu	Romania	4 August 1997	Athens	
14		15.16 m (49 ft 8 3/4 in)	+0.7	Trecia Smith	Jamaica	2 August 2004	Linz	
16		15.15 m (49 ft 8 1/4 in)	+1.5	Ashia Hansen	Great Britain	13 September 1997	Fukuoka	
17		15.14 m (49 ft 8 in)	+1.9	Nadezhda Alekhina	Russia	26 July 2009	Cheboksary	
18		15.13 m (49 ft 7 1/2 in)	+1.3	Davisleydi Velazco	Cuba	19 June 2026	Doha	
19		15.09 m (49 ft 6 in)	+0.5	Anna Biryukova	Russia	29 August 1993	Stuttgart	
19		15.09 m (49 ft 6 in)	−0.5	Inna Lasovskaya	Russia	31 May 1997	Valencia	
21		15.08 m (49 ft 5 1/2 in)	+0.1	Saly Sarr	Senegal	23 August 2026	Chorzów	
22		15.07 m (49 ft 5 1/4 in)	−0.6	Paraskevi Tsiamita	Greece	22 August 1999	Seville	
23		15.06 m (49 ft 4 3/4 in)	−0.1	Leyanis Pérez Hernández	Cuba	10 July 2026	Monaco	
24		15.04 m (49 ft 4 in)	+1.7	Ekaterina Koneva	Russia	30 May 2015	Eugene	
25		15.03 m (49 ft 3 1/2 in)	+1.9	Magdelín Martínez	Italy	26 June 2004	Rome	
25		15.03 m (49 ft 3 1/2 in)	+1.1	Marija Šestak	Slovenia	17 August 2008	Beijing	
25		15.03 m (49 ft 3 1/2 in)	±0.0	Shanieka Ricketts	Jamaica	16 September 2023	Eugene	

==== Ancillary marks ====
Jumps made en route to final marks that would be top 25 performances:

- Yulimar Rojas also jumped 15.42 (+1.2) in Lausanne, Switzerland on 26 August 2021; 15.41 (+1.1) in Tokyo, Japan on 1 August 2021; 15.39 (+0.5) in Eugene, Oregon on 18 July 2022; 15.31 (+0.2) in Andújar, Spain on 22 May 2021; 15.27 (−0.4) in Zürich, Switzerland on 9 September 2021; 15.25 (+0.1) in Tokyo on 1 August 2021.
- Françoise Mbango Etone also jumped 15.30 (+0.5) in Athens, Greece on 23 August 2004.
- Tatyana Lebedeva also jumped 15.28 (−0.3) in Iráklio, Greece on 4 July 2004.

==== Assisted marks ====
Any performance with a following wind of more than 2.0 metres per second is not counted for record purposes. Below is a list of wind-assisted jumps (equal or superior to 15.03 m). Only the best assisted mark that is superior to the legal best is shown:

- Magdelin Martínez jumped 15.24 (+4.2) A in Sestriere, Italy on 1 August 2004.
- Anna Pyatykh jumped 15.17 (+2.4) in Athens, Greece on 2 July 2006.
- Leyanis Pérez jumped 15.16 (+2.3) in Guadalajara, Spain on 23 June 2024.
- Keila Costa jumped 15.10 (+2.7) in Uberlândia, Brazil on 6 May 2007.
- Olga Saladukha jumped 15.06 (+2.3) in Stockholm, Sweden on 29 July 2011.
- Liadagmis Povea jumped 15.05 (+3.1) in Havana, Cuba on 8 March 2019.

=== Men (indoor) ===
Only one performance (best) per athlete

Rank	Mark	Athlete	Date	Place	Ref.
1	18.07 m (59 ft 3 1/4 in)	Hugues Fabrice Zango (BUR)	16 January 2021	Aubière	
2	17.92 m (58 ft 9 1/2 in)	Teddy Tamgho (FRA)	6 March 2011	Paris	
3	17.83 m (58 ft 5 3/4 in)	Aliecer Urrutia (CUB)	1 March 1997	Sindelfingen	
3	17.83 m (58 ft 5 3/4 in)	Christian Olsson (SWE)	7 March 2004	Budapest	
5	17.80 m (58 ft 4 3/4 in)	Andy Díaz (ITA)	21 March 2025	Nanjing	
6	17.77 m (58 ft 3 1/2 in)	Leonid Voloshin (RUS)	6 February 1994	Grenoble	
7	17.76 m (58 ft 3 in)	Mike Conley (USA)	27 February 1987	New York City	
8	17.75 m (58 ft 2 3/4 in)	Phillips Idowu (GBR)	9 March 2008	Valencia	
9	17.74 m (58 ft 2 1/4 in)	Marian Oprea (ROU)	18 February 2006	Bucharest	
10	17.73 m (58 ft 2 in)	Walter Davis (USA)	12 March 2006	Moscow	
10	17.73 m (58 ft 2 in)	Fabrizio Donato (ITA)	6 March 2011	Paris	
12	17.72 m (58 ft 1 1/2 in)	Brian Wellman (BER)	12 March 1995	Barcelona	
13	17.70 m (58 ft 3/4 in)	Will Claye (USA)	11 March 2012	Istanbul	
13	17.70 m (58 ft 3/4 in)	Daniele Greco (ITA)	2 March 2013	Gothenburg	
15	17.69 m (58 ft 1/4 in)	Yoandri Betanzos (CUB)	14 March 2010	Doha	
16	17.67 m (57 ft 11 1/2 in)	Oleg Protsenko (URS)	15 January 1987	Osaka	
17	17.64 m (57 ft 10 1/4 in)	Jonathan Edwards (GBR)	15 February 1988	Birmingham	
17	17.64 m (57 ft 10 1/4 in)	Lázaro Martínez (CUB)	18 March 2022	Belgrade	
19	17.63 m (57 ft 10 in)	Christian Taylor (USA)	11 March 2012	Istanbul	
20	17.62 m (57 ft 9 1/2 in)	Yoelbi Quesada (CUB)	12 March 1995	Barcelona	
20	17.62 m (57 ft 9 1/2 in)	Yoel García (CUB)	1 March 1997	Sindelfingen	
22	17.60 m (57 ft 8 3/4 in)	Pedro Pichardo (POR)	3 March 2023	Istanbul	
23	17.59 m (57 ft 8 1/2 in)	Pierre Camara (FRA)	13 March 1993	Toronto	
23	17.59 m (57 ft 8 1/2 in)	Jordan Díaz (ESP)	19 February 2023	Madrid	
25	17.56 m (57 ft 7 1/4 in)	Jadel Gregório (BRA)	12 March 2006	Moscow	

=== Women (indoor) ===
Only one performance (best) per athlete

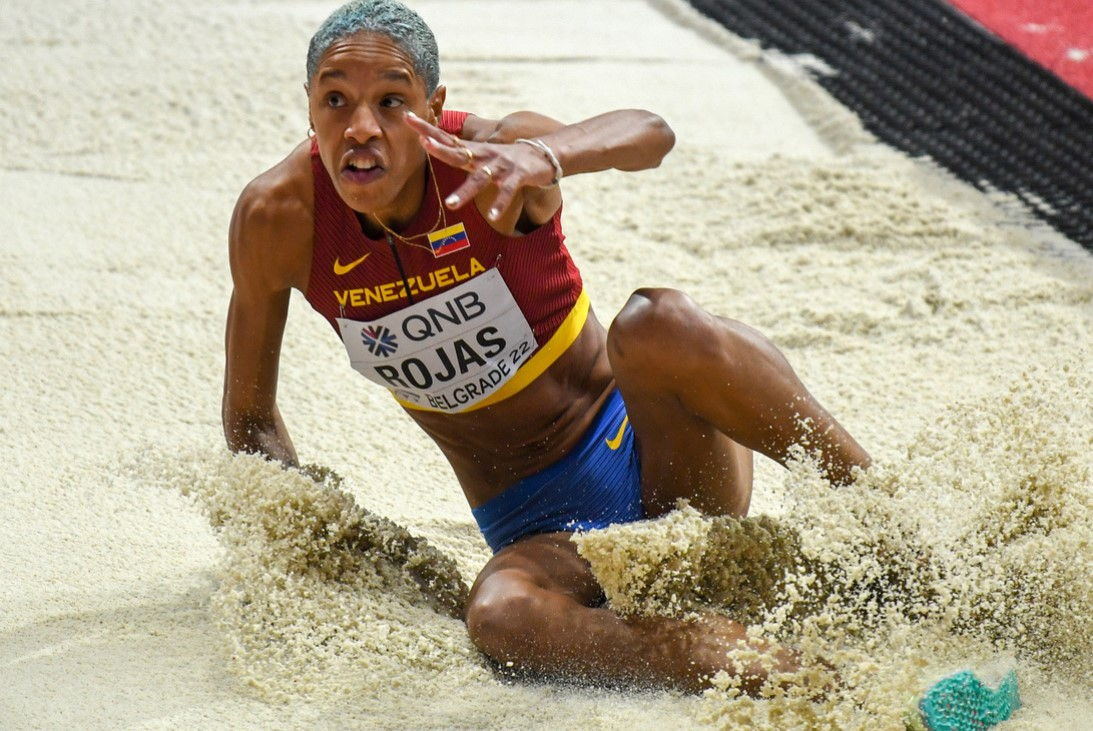
Yulimar Rojas landing the women's world record triple jump at the 2022 World Athletics Indoor Championships in Belgrade on 20 March 2022

Rank	Mark	Athlete	Date	Place	Ref.
1	15.74 m (51 ft 7 1/2 in)	Yulimar Rojas (VEN)	20 March 2022	Belgrade	
2	15.36 m (50 ft 4 1/2 in)	Tatyana Lebedeva (RUS)	6 March 2004	Budapest	
3	15.16 m (49 ft 8 3/4 in)	Ashia Hansen (GBR)	28 February 1998	Valencia	
4	15.14 m (49 ft 8 in)	Olga Rypakova (KAZ)	13 March 2010	Doha	
5	15.12 m (49 ft 7 1/4 in) A	Jasmine Moore (USA)	11 March 2023	Albuquerque	
6	15.08 m (49 ft 5 1/2 in)	Marija Šestak (SLO)	13 February 2008	Athens	
7	15.05 m (49 ft 4 1/2 in)	Yargelis Savigne (CUB)	8 March 2008	Valencia	
8	15.03 m (49 ft 3 1/2 in)	Yolanda Chen (RUS)	11 March 1995	Barcelona	
9	15.01 m (49 ft 2 3/4 in)	Inna Lasovskaya (RUS)	8 March 1997	Paris	
9	15.01 m (49 ft 2 3/4 in)	Thea LaFond (DMA)	3 March 2024	Glasgow	
11	14.95 m (49 ft 1/2 in)	Leyanis Pérez (CUB)	21 March 2026	Toruń	
12	14.94 m (49 ft 0 in)	Iva Prandzheva (BUL)	7 March 1999	Maebashi	
12	14.94 m (49 ft 0 in)	Cristina Nicolau (ROU)	5 February 2000	Bucharest	
12	14.94 m (49 ft 0 in)	Oksana Udmurtova (RUS)	20 February 2008	Tartu	
15	14.93 m (48 ft 11 3/4 in)	Anna Pyatykh (RUS)	11 March 2006	Moscow	
16	14.91 m (48 ft 11 in)	Rodica Mateescu (ROU)	28 February 1997	Bucharest	
16	14.91 m (48 ft 11 in)	Tereza Marinova (BUL)	11 March 2001	Lisbon	
18	14.90 m (48 ft 10 1/2 in)	Yamilé Aldama (SUD)	6 March 2004	Budapest	
19	14.88 m (48 ft 9 3/4 in)	Françoise Mbango Etone (CMR)	15 March 2003	Birmingham	
19	14.88 m (48 ft 9 3/4 in)	Olha Saladukha (UKR)	3 March 2013	Gothenburg	
19	14.88 m (48 ft 9 3/4 in) A	Charisma Taylor (BAH)	11 March 2023	Albuquerque	
22	14.87 m (48 ft 9 1/4 in)	Šárka Kašpárková (CZE)	7 March 1999	Maebashi	
23	14.84 m (48 ft 8 1/4 in)	Chrysopigi Devetzi (GRE)	4 March 2013	Athens	
23	14.84 m (48 ft 8 1/4 in)	Trecia Smith (JAM)	11 March 2006	Moscow	
25	14.83 m (48 ft 7 3/4 in)	Yelena Lebedenko (RUS)	1 February 2001	Samara	

== Olympic medalists ==
=== Men ===
Games	Gold	Silver	Bronze
1896 Athens	James Brendan Connolly; United States	Alexandre Tuffère; France	Ioannis Persakis; Greece
1900 Paris	Myer Prinstein; United States	James Brendan Connolly; United States	Lewis Sheldon; United States
1904 St. Louis	Myer Prinstein; United States	Fred Englehardt; United States	Robert Stangland; United States
1908 London	Tim Ahearne; Great Britain	Garfield MacDonald; Canada	Edvard Larsen; Norway
1912 Stockholm	Gustaf Lindblom; Sweden	Georg Åberg; Sweden	Erik Almlöf; Sweden
1920 Antwerp	Vilho Tuulos; Finland	Folke Jansson; Sweden	Erik Almlöf; Sweden
1924 Paris	Nick Winter; Australia	Luis Brunetto; Argentina	Vilho Tuulos; Finland
1928 Amsterdam	Mikio Oda; Japan	Levi Casey; United States	Vilho Tuulos; Finland
1932 Los Angeles	Chūhei Nambu; Japan	Erik Svensson; Sweden	Kenkichi Oshima; Japan
1936 Berlin	Naoto Tajima; Japan	Masao Harada; Japan	Jack Metcalfe; Australia
1948 London	Arne Åhman; Sweden	George Avery; Australia	Ruhi Sarıalp; Turkey
1952 Helsinki	Adhemar da Silva; Brazil	Leonid Shcherbakov; Soviet Union	Asnoldo Devonish; Venezuela
1956 Melbourne	Adhemar da Silva; Brazil	Vilhjálmur Einarsson; Iceland	Vitold Kreyer; Soviet Union
1960 Rome	Józef Szmidt; Poland	Vladimir Goryaev; Soviet Union	Vitold Kreyer; Soviet Union
1964 Tokyo	Józef Szmidt; Poland	Oleg Fedoseyev; Soviet Union	Viktor Kravchenko; Soviet Union
1968 Mexico City	Viktor Saneyev; Soviet Union	Nelson Prudêncio; Brazil	Giuseppe Gentile; Italy
1972 Munich	Viktor Saneyev; Soviet Union	Jörg Drehmel; East Germany	Nelson Prudêncio; Brazil
1976 Montreal	Viktor Saneyev; Soviet Union	James Butts; United States	João Carlos de Oliveira; Brazil
1980 Moscow	Jaak Uudmäe; Soviet Union	Viktor Saneyev; Soviet Union	João Carlos de Oliveira; Brazil
1984 Los Angeles	Al Joyner; United States	Mike Conley; United States	Keith Connor; Great Britain
1988 Seoul	Khristo Markov; Bulgaria	Igor Lapshin; Soviet Union	Aleksandr Kovalenko; Soviet Union
1992 Barcelona	Mike Conley; United States	Charles Simpkins; United States	Frank Rutherford; Bahamas
1996 Atlanta	Kenny Harrison; United States	Jonathan Edwards; Great Britain	Yoelbi Quesada; Cuba
2000 Sydney	Jonathan Edwards; Great Britain	Yoel García; Cuba	Denis Kapustin; Russia
2004 Athens	Christian Olsson; Sweden	Marian Oprea; Romania	Danil Burkenya; Russia
2008 Beijing	Nelson Évora; Portugal	Phillips Idowu; Great Britain	Leevan Sands; Bahamas
2012 London	Christian Taylor; United States	Will Claye; United States	Fabrizio Donato; Italy
2016 Rio de Janeiro	Christian Taylor; United States	Will Claye; United States	Dong Bin; China
2020 Tokyo	Pedro Pichardo; Portugal	Zhu Yaming; China	Hugues Fabrice Zango; Burkina Faso
2024 Paris	Jordan Díaz; Spain	Pedro Pichardo; Portugal	Andy Díaz; Italy
2028 Los Angeles			

=== Women ===
Games	Gold	Silver	Bronze
1996 Atlanta	Inessa Kravets; Ukraine	Inna Lasovskaya; Russia	Šárka Kašpárková; Czech Republic
2000 Sydney	Tereza Marinova; Bulgaria	Tatyana Lebedeva; Russia	Olena Hovorova; Ukraine
2004 Athens	Françoise Mbango Etone; Cameroon	Hrysopiyí Devetzí; Greece	Tatyana Lebedeva; Russia
2008 Beijing	Françoise Mbango Etone; Cameroon	Olga Rypakova; Kazakhstan	Yargelis Savigne; Cuba
2012 London	Olga Rypakova; Kazakhstan	Caterine Ibargüen; Colombia	Olha Saladukha; Ukraine
2016 Rio de Janeiro	Caterine Ibargüen; Colombia	Yulimar Rojas; Venezuela	Olga Rypakova; Kazakhstan
2020 Tokyo	Yulimar Rojas; Venezuela	Patrícia Mamona; Portugal	Ana Peleteiro; Spain
2024 Paris	Thea LaFond; Dominica	Shanieka Ricketts; Jamaica	Jasmine Moore; United States

== World Championships medalists ==
=== Men ===
Championships	Gold	Silver	Bronze
1983 Helsinki	Zdzisław Hoffmann (POL)	Willie Banks (USA)	Ajayi Agbebaku (NGR)
1987 Rome	Khristo Markov (BUL)	Mike Conley (USA)	Oleg Sakirkin (URS)
1991 Tokyo	Kenny Harrison (USA)	Leonid Voloshin (URS)	Mike Conley (USA)
1993 Stuttgart	Mike Conley (USA)	Leonid Voloshin (RUS)	Jonathan Edwards (GBR)
1995 Gothenburg	Jonathan Edwards (GBR)	Brian Wellman (BER)	Jérôme Romain (DMA)
1997 Athens	Yoelbi Quesada (CUB)	Jonathan Edwards (GBR)	Aliecer Urrutia (CUB)
1999 Seville	Charles Friedek (GER)	Rostislav Dimitrov (BUL)	Jonathan Edwards (GBR)
2001 Edmonton	Jonathan Edwards (GBR)	Christian Olsson (SWE)	Igor Spasovkhodskiy (RUS)
2003 Saint-Denis	Christian Olsson (SWE)	Yoandri Betanzos (CUB)	Leevan Sands (BAH)
2005 Helsinki	Walter Davis (USA)	Yoandri Betanzos (CUB)	Marian Oprea (ROU)
2007 Osaka	Nelson Évora (POR)	Jadel Gregório (BRA)	Walter Davis (USA)
2009 Berlin	Phillips Idowu (GBR)	Nelson Évora (POR)	Alexis Copello (CUB)
2011 Daegu	Christian Taylor (USA)	Phillips Idowu (GBR)	Will Claye (USA)
2013 Moscow	Teddy Tamgho (FRA)	Pedro Pichardo (CUB)	Will Claye (USA)
2015 Beijing	Christian Taylor (USA)	Pedro Pichardo (CUB)	Nelson Évora (POR)
2017 London	Christian Taylor (USA)	Will Claye (USA)	Nelson Évora (POR)
2019 Doha	Christian Taylor (USA)	Will Claye (USA)	Hugues Fabrice Zango (BUR)
2022 Eugene	Pedro Pichardo (POR)	Hugues Fabrice Zango (BUR)	Zhu Yaming (CHN)
2023 Budapest	Hugues Fabrice Zango (BUR)	Lázaro Martínez (CUB)	Cristian Nápoles (CUB)
2025 Tokyo	Pedro Pichardo (POR)	Andrea Dallavalle (ITA)	Lázaro Martínez (CUB)

=== Women ===
Championships	Gold	Silver	Bronze
1993 Stuttgart	Anna Biryukova (RUS)	Yolanda Chen (RUS)	Iva Prandzheva (BUL)
1995 Gothenburg	Inessa Kravets (UKR)	Iva Prandzheva (BUL)	Anna Biryukova (RUS)
1997 Athens	Šárka Kašpárková (CZE)	Rodica Mateescu (ROU)	Olena Hovorova (UKR)
1999 Seville	Paraskevi Tsiamita (GRE)	Yamilé Aldama (CUB)	Olga Vasdeki (GRE)
2001 Edmonton	Tatyana Lebedeva (RUS)	Françoise Mbango Etone (CMR)	Tereza Marinova (BUL)
2003 Saint-Denis	Tatyana Lebedeva (RUS)	Françoise Mbango Etone (CMR)	Magdelín Martínez (ITA)
2005 Helsinki	Trecia Smith (JAM)	Yargelis Savigne (CUB)	Anna Pyatykh (RUS)
2007 Osaka^{[B]}	Yargelis Savigne (CUB)	Tatyana Lebedeva (RUS)	Marija Šestak (SLO)
2009 Berlin	Yargelis Savigne (CUB)	Mabel Gay (CUB)	Anna Pyatykh (RUS)
2011 Daegu	Olha Saladukha (UKR)	Olga Rypakova (KAZ)	Caterine Ibargüen (COL)
2013 Moscow	Caterine Ibargüen (COL)	Ekaterina Koneva (RUS)	Olha Saladukha (UKR)
2015 Beijing	Caterine Ibargüen (COL)	Hanna Knyazyeva-Minenko (ISR)	Olga Rypakova (KAZ)
2017 London	Yulimar Rojas (VEN)	Caterine Ibargüen (COL)	Olga Rypakova (KAZ)
2019 Doha	Yulimar Rojas (VEN)	Shanieka Ricketts (JAM)	Caterine Ibargüen (COL)
2022 Eugene	Yulimar Rojas (VEN)	Shanieka Ricketts (JAM)	Tori Franklin (USA)
2023 Budapest	Yulimar Rojas (VEN)	Maryna Bekh-Romanchuk (UKR)	Leyanis Pérez Hernández (CUB)
2025 Tokyo	Leyanis Pérez (CUB)	Thea LaFond (DMA)	Yulimar Rojas (VEN)

==== Note ====
- ^{^{B}} The original bronze medalist (Hrysopiyi Devetzi of Greece) was disqualified for doping in 2016. The medal was given to Anna Pyatykh but later in 2017 she was disqualified for the use of steroids.

== World Indoor Championships medalists ==
=== Men ===
Games	Gold	Silver	Bronze
1985 Paris^{[A]}	Khristo Markov (BUL)	Lázaro Betancourt (CUB)	Lázaro Balcindes (CUB)
1987 Indianapolis	Mike Conley (USA)	Oleg Protsenko (URS)	Frank Rutherford (BAH)
1989 Budapest	Mike Conley (USA)	Jorge Reyna (CUB)	Juan Miguel López (CUB)
1991 Seville	Igor Lapshin (URS)	Leonid Voloshin (URS)	Tord Henriksson (SWE)
1993 Toronto	Pierre Camara (FRA)	Māris Bružiks (LAT)	Brian Wellman (BER)
1995 Barcelona	Brian Wellman (BER)	Yoelbi Quesada (CUB)	Serge Hélan (FRA)
1997 Paris	Yoel García (CUB)	Aliecer Urrutia (CUB)	Aleksandr Aseledchenko (RUS)
1999 Maebashi	Charles Friedek (GER)	LaMark Carter (USA)	Zsolt Czingler (HUN)
2001 Lisbon	Paolo Camossi (ITA)	Jonathan Edwards (GBR)	Andrew Murphy (AUS)
2003 Birmingham	Christian Olsson (SWE)	Walter Davis (USA)	Yoelbi Quesada (CUB)
2004 Budapest	Christian Olsson (SWE)	Jadel Gregório (BRA)	Yoandri Betanzos (CUB)
2006 Moscow	Walter Davis (USA)	Jadel Gregório (BRA)	Yoandri Betanzos (CUB)
2008 Valencia	Phillips Idowu (GBR)	Arnie David Giralt (CUB)	Nelson Évora (POR)
2010 Doha	Teddy Tamgho (FRA)	Yoandri Betanzos (CUB)	Arnie David Giralt (CUB)
2012 Istanbul	Will Claye (USA)	Christian Taylor (USA)	Lyukman Adams (RUS)
2014 Sopot	Lyukman Adams (RUS)	Ernesto Revé (CUB)	Pedro Pichardo (CUB)
2016 Portland	Dong Bin (CHN)	Max Heß (GER)	Benjamin Compaoré (FRA)
2018 Birmingham	Will Claye (USA)	Almir dos Santos (BRA)	Nelson Évora (POR)
2022 Belgrade	Lázaro Martínez (CUB)	Pedro Pichardo (POR)	Donald Scott (USA)
2024 Glasgow	Hugues Fabrice Zango (BUR)	Yasser Triki (ALG)	Tiago Pereira (POR)
2025 Nanjing^{[B]}	Andy Díaz (ITA)	Zhu Yaming (CHN)	Hugues Fabrice Zango (BUR)
2026 Toruń	Andy Díaz (ITA)	Jordan Scott (JAM)	Yasser Triki (ALG)

- ^{^{A}} Known as the World Indoor Games
- ^{^{B}} The original bronze medalist (Almir dos Santos of Brazil) was disqualified for wearing non-regulation shoes.

=== Women ===
Games	Gold	Silver	Bronze
1993 Toronto	Inessa Kravets (UKR)	Yolanda Chen (RUS)	Inna Lasovskaya (RUS)
1995 Barcelona	Yolanda Chen (RUS)	Iva Prandzheva (BUL)	Ren Ruiping (CHN)
1997 Paris	Inna Lasovskaya (RUS)	Ashia Hansen (GBR)	Šárka Kašpárková (CZE)
1999 Maebashi	Ashia Hansen (GBR)	Iva Prandzheva (BUL)	Šárka Kašpárková (CZE)
2001 Lisbon	Tereza Marinova (BUL)	Tatyana Lebedeva (RUS)	Tiombe Hurd (USA)
2003 Birmingham	Ashia Hansen (GBR)	Françoise Mbango Etone (CMR)	Kéné Ndoye (SEN)
2004 Budapest	Tatyana Lebedeva (RUS)	Yamilé Aldama (SUD)	Hrysopiyi Devetzi (GRE)
2006 Moscow	Tatyana Lebedeva (RUS)	Anna Pyatykh (RUS)	Yamilé Aldama (SUD)
2008 Valencia	Yargelis Savigne (CUB)	Hrysopiyi Devetzi (GRE)	Marija Šestak (SLO)
2010 Doha	Olga Rypakova (KAZ)	Yargelis Savigne (CUB)	Anna Pyatykh (RUS)
2012 Istanbul	Yamilé Aldama (GBR)	Olga Rypakova (KAZ)	Mabel Gay (CUB)
2014 Sopot	Ekaterina Koneva (RUS)	Olha Saladukha (UKR)	Kimberly Williams (JAM)
2016 Portland	Yulimar Rojas (VEN)	Kristin Gierisch (GER)	Paraskevi Papachristou (GRE)
2018 Birmingham	Yulimar Rojas (VEN)	Kimberly Williams (JAM)	Ana Peleteiro (ESP)
2022 Belgrade	Yulimar Rojas (VEN)	Maryna Bekh-Romanchuk (UKR)	Kimberly Williams (JAM)
2024 Glasgow	Thea Lafond (DMA)	Leyanis Pérez (CUB)	Ana Peleteiro (ESP)
2025 Nanjing	Leyanis Pérez (CUB)	Liadagmis Povea (CUB)	Ana Peleteiro-Compaoré (ESP)
2026 Toruń	Leyanis Pérez (CUB)	Yulimar Rojas (VEN)	Saly Sarr (SEN)

== World leading marks ==
=== Men ===
Year	Mark	Athlete	Place
1967	16.92 m (55 ft 6 in)	Aleksandr Zolotarev (URS)	Chorzów
1968	17.39 m (57 ft 1/2 in) A	Viktor Saneyev (URS)	Mexico City
1969	16.94 m (55 ft 6 3/4 in)	Viktor Saneyev (URS)	Athens
1970	17.34 m (56 ft 10 1/2 in)	Viktor Saneyev (URS)	Sokhumi
1971	17.40 m (57 ft 1 in)	Pedro Pérez (CUB)	Cali
1972	17.44 m (57 ft 2 1/2 in)	Viktor Saneyev (URS)	Sokhumi
1973	17.20 m (56 ft 5 in)	Mikhail Bariban (URS)	Moscow
1974	17.23 m (56 ft 6 1/4 in)	Viktor Saneyev (URS)	Rome
1975	17.89 m (58 ft 8 1/4 in) A	João Carlos de Oliveira (BRA)	Mexico City
1976	17.38 m (57 ft 1/4 in)	João Carlos de Oliveira (BRA)	Rio de Janeiro
1977	17.19 m (56 ft 4 3/4 in)	Ron Livers (USA)	Sochi
1978	17.44 m (57 ft 2 1/2 in)	João Carlos de Oliveira (BRA)	Bratislava
1979	17.27 m (56 ft 7 3/4 in)	João Carlos de Oliveira (BRA)	San Juan
1980	17.35 m (56 ft 11 in)	Jaak Uudmäe (URS)	Moscow
1981	17.56 m (57 ft 7 1/4 in)	Willie Banks (USA)	Sacramento
1982	17.57 m (57 ft 7 1/2 in)	Keith Connor (GBR)	Provo
1983	17.55 m (57 ft 6 3/4 in)	Vasiliy Grishchenkov (URS)	Moscow
1984	17.46 m (57 ft 3 1/4 in)	Oleg Protsenko (URS)	Moscow
1985	17.97 m (58 ft 11 1/4 in)	Willie Banks (USA)	Indianapolis
1986	17.80 m (58 ft 4 3/4 in)	Khristo Markov (BUL)	Budapest
1987	17.92 m (58 ft 9 1/2 in)	Khristo Markov (BUL)	Rome
1988	17.77 m (58 ft 3 1/2 in)	Khristo Markov (BUL)	Sofia
1989	17.65 m (57 ft 10 3/4 in) i	Mike Conley (USA)	Budapest
1990	17.93 m (58 ft 9 3/4 in)	Kenny Harrison (USA)	Stockholm
1991	17.78 m (58 ft 4 in)	Kenny Harrison (USA)	Tokyo
1992	17.72 m (58 ft 1 1/2 in)	Mike Conley (USA)	Zürich
1993	17.86 m (58 ft 7 in)	Mike Conley (USA)	Stuttgart
1994	17.77 m (58 ft 3 1/2 in) i	Leonid Voloshin (RUS)	Grenoble
1995	18.29 m (60 ft 0 in)	Jonathan Edwards (GBR)	Gothenburg
1996	18.09 m (59 ft 4 in)	Kenny Harrison (USA)	Atlanta
1997	17.85 m (58 ft 6 3/4 in)	Yoelbi Quesada (CUB)	Athens
1998	18.01 m (59 ft 1 in)	Jonathan Edwards (GBR)	Oslo
1999	17.59 m (57 ft 8 1/2 in)	Charles Friedek (GER)	Seville
2000	17.71 m (58 ft 1 in)	Jonathan Edwards (GBR)	Sydney
2001	17.92 m (58 ft 9 1/2 in)	Jonathan Edwards (GBR)	Edmonton
2002	17.86 m (58 ft 7 in)	Jonathan Edwards (GBR)	Manchester
2003	17.77 m (58 ft 3 1/2 in)	Christian Olsson (SWE)	Haina
2004	17.83 m (58 ft 5 3/4 in) i	Christian Olsson (SWE)	Budapest
2005	17.81 m (58 ft 5 in)	Marian Oprea (ROM)	Lausanne
2006	17.74 m (58 ft 2 1/4 in) i	Marian Oprea (ROM)	Bucharest
2007	17.90 m (58 ft 8 1/2 in)	Jadel Gregório (BRA)	Belém
2008	17.75 m (58 ft 2 3/4 in) i	Phillips Idowu (GBR)	Valencia
2009	17.73 m (58 ft 2 in)	Phillips Idowu (GBR)	Berlin
2010	17.98 m (58 ft 11 3/4 in)	Teddy Tamgho (FRA)	New York City
2011	17.96 m (58 ft 11 in)	Christian Taylor (USA)	Daegu
2012	17.81 m (58 ft 5 in)	Christian Taylor (USA)	London
2013	18.04 m (59 ft 2 in)	Teddy Tamgho (FRA)	Moscow
2014	17.76 m (58 ft 3 in)	Pedro Pichardo (CUB)	Havana
2015	18.21 m (59 ft 8 3/4 in)	Christian Taylor (USA)	Beijing
2016	17.86 m (58 ft 7 in)	Christian Taylor (USA)	Rio de Janeiro
2017	18.11 m (59 ft 4 3/4 in)	Christian Taylor (USA)	Eugene
2018	17.95 m (58 ft 10 1/2 in)	Pedro Pichardo (POR)	Doha
2019	18.14 m (59 ft 6 in)	Will Claye (USA)	Long Beach
2020	17.77 m (58 ft 3 1/2 in) i	Hugues Fabrice Zango (BUR)	Paris
2021	18.07 m (59 ft 3 1/4 in) i	Hugues Fabrice Zango (BUR)	Aubière
2022	17.95 m (58 ft 10 1/2 in)	Pedro Pichardo (POR)	Eugene
2023	17.87 m (58 ft 7 1/2 in)	Jaydon Hibbert (JAM)	Baton Rouge
2024	18.18 m (59 ft 7 1/2 in)	Jordan Díaz (ESP)	Rome
2025	17.91 m (58 ft 9 in)	Pedro Pichardo (POR)	Tokyo
2026	18.15 m (59 ft 6 1/2 in)	Andy Díaz (ITA)	Birmingham

=== Women ===
Year	Mark	Athlete	Place
1986	13.68 m (44 ft 10 1/2 in)	Esmeralda de Jesus Garcia (BRA)	Indianapolis
1987	14.04 m (46 ft 3/4 in)	Li Huirong (CHN)	Hamamatsu
1988	14.16 m (46 ft 5 1/4 in)	Li Huirong (CHN)	Shijiazhuang
1989	14.52 m (47 ft 7 1/2 in)	Galina Chistyakova (URS)	Stockholm
1990	14.54 m (47 ft 8 1/4 in)	Li Huirong (CHN)	Sapporo
1991	14.95 m (49 ft 1/2 in)	Inessa Kravets (URS)	Moscow
1992	14.62 m (47 ft 11 1/2 in)	Galina Chistyakova (RUS)	Villeneuve-d'Ascq
1993	15.09 m (49 ft 6 in)	Anna Biryukova (RUS)	Stuttgart
1994	14.98 m (49 ft 1 3/4 in)	Sofiya Bozhanova (BUL)	Stara Zagora
1995	15.50 m (50 ft 10 in)	Inessa Kravets (UKR)	Gothenburg
1996	15.33 m (50 ft 3 1/2 in)	Inessa Kravets (UKR)	Sacramento
1997	15.20 m (49 ft 10 1/4 in)	Šárka Kašpárková (CZE)	Athens
1998	15.16 m (49 ft 8 3/4 in) i	Ashia Hansen (GBR)	Maebashi
1999	15.07 m (49 ft 5 1/4 in)	Paraskevi Tsiamita (GRE)	Seville
2000	15.32 m (50 ft 3 in)	Tatyana Lebedeva (RUS)	Yokohama
2001	15.25 m (50 ft 1/4 in)	Tatyana Lebedeva (RUS)	Edmonton
2002	14.95 m (49 ft 1/2 in)	Françoise Mbango Etone (CMR)	Radès
2003	15.29 m (50 ft 1 3/4 in)	Yamilé Aldama (CUB)	Rome
2004	15.36 m (50 ft 4 1/2 in) i	Tatyana Lebedeva (RUS)	Budapest
2005	15.11 m (49 ft 6 3/4 in)	Tatyana Lebedeva (RUS)	Saint-Denis
2005	15.11 m (49 ft 6 3/4 in)	Trecia Smith (JAM)	Helsinki
2006	15.23 m (49 ft 11 1/2 in)	Tatyana Lebedeva (RUS)	Athens
2007	15.28 m (50 ft 1 1/2 in)	Yargelis Savigne (CUB)	Osaka
2008	15.39 m (50 ft 5 3/4 in)	Françoise Mbango Etone (CMR)	Beijing
2009	15.14 m (49 ft 8 in)	Nadezhda Alekhina (RUS)	Cheboksary
2010	15.25 m (50 ft 1/4 in)	Olga Rypakova (KAZ)	Split
2011	14.99 m (49 ft 2 in)	Yargelis Savigne (CUB)	Saint-Denis
2011	14.99 m (49 ft 2 in) A	Caterine Ibargüen (COL)	Bogotá
2012	14.99 m (49 ft 2 in)	Olha Saladuha (UKR)	Helsinki
2013	14.88 m (48 ft 9 3/4 in) i	Olha Saladuha (UKR)	Gothenburg
2014	15.31 m (50 ft 2 3/4 in)	Caterine Ibargüen (COL)	Monaco
2015	15.04 m (49 ft 4 in)	Ekaterina Koneva (RUS)	Eugene
2016	15.17 m (49 ft 9 in)	Caterine Ibargüen (COL)	Rio de Janeiro
2017	14.96 m (49 ft 3/4 in)	Yulimar Rojas (VEN)	Andújar
2018	14.96 m (49 ft 3/4 in)	Caterine Ibargüen (COL)	Rabat
2019	15.11 m (49 ft 6 3/4 in)	Yulimar Rojas (VEN)	Lima
2020	15.43 m (50 ft 7 1/4 in) i	Yulimar Rojas (VEN)	Madrid
2021	15.67 m (51 ft 4 3/4 in)	Yulimar Rojas (VEN)	Tokyo
2022	15.74 m (51 ft 7 1/2 in) i	Yulimar Rojas (VEN)	Belgrade
2023	15.35 m (50 ft 4 1/4 in)	Yulimar Rojas (VEN)	Eugene
2024	15.02 m (49 ft 3 1/4 in)	Thea LaFond (DMA)	Saint-Denis
2025	14.94 m (49 ft 0 in)	Leyanis Pérez (CUB)	Tokyo
2026	15.25 m (50 ft 1/4 in)	Thea LaFond (DMA)	Zagreb
