= 2001 World Championships in Athletics – Women's triple jump =

These are the results of the women's triple jump event at the 2001 World Championships in Athletics in Edmonton, Alberta, Canada which occurred August 3–12. At the 2001 World Championships there were a total of twenty-two events that women competed in, eight of which were in the same category, field events, as the triple jump. Twenty-four total women competed in the qualification round which contained Group A and Group B, composed of twelve athletes each. The athletes came from nineteen different nationalities including two from the United States and Romania, and three from Russia. Out of the twenty-four women in the qualification round, twelve got to move on to the final round where the gold, silver, and bronze medals were given out.

The winning margin was 65 cm which as of 2024 remains the only time the women's triple jump has been won by more than 60 cm at these championships.

== Medalists ==
Gold	Tatyana Lebedeva; Russia (RUS)
Silver	Françoise Mbango Etone; Cameroon (CMR)
Bronze	Tereza Marinova; Bulgaria (BUL)

== Schedule ==
- All times are Mountain Standard Time (UTC−7)

Qualification Round
Group A	Group B
08.08.2001 – 18:00	08.08.2001 – 18:00
Final Round
10.08.2001 – 20:00

== Results ==
=== Qualification ===
Qualification: Qualifying Performance 14.05 (Q) or at least 12 best performers (q) advance to the final.

Rank	Group	Athlete	Nationality	#1	#2	#3	Result	Notes
1	A	Tereza Marinova	Bulgaria	14.89			14.89	Q
2	A	Françoise Mbango Etone	Cameroon	14.64			14.64	Q
3	B	Magdelín Martínez	Italy	14.59			14.59	Q, PB
4	B	Cristina Nicolau	Romania	14.56			14.56	Q
5	B	Ashia Hansen	Great Britain	14.51			14.51	Q, SB
6	B	Olena Hovorova	Ukraine	x	14.48		14.48	Q
7	B	Tatyana Lebedeva	Russia	14.35			14.35	Q
8	A	Heli Koivula	Finland	14.28			14.28	Q, SB
9	B	Natallia Safronava	Belarus	14.20			14.20	Q, SB
10	B	Camilla Johansson	Sweden	14.02	14.17		14.17	Q
11	A	Trecia Smith	Jamaica	13.47	14.15		14.15	Q
12	B	Olga Bolshova	Moldova	13.79	14.11		14.11	Q
13	A	Tiombe Hurd	United States	13.96	13.72	13.69	13.96	
14	A	Yelena Oleynikova	Russia	13.94	13.95	13.95	13.95	
15	A	Adelina Gavrilă	Romania	13.86	13.63	13.91	13.91	
16	A	Olga Yershova	Russia	12.79	x	13.87	13.87	
17	A	Nicole Herschmann	Germany	x	13.81	x	13.81	
18	B	Yuliana Martinez-Perez	United States	13.48	13.69	13.63	13.69	
19	A	Liliana Zagacka	Poland	13.53	x	13.65	13.65	
20	A	Yelena Parfenova	Kazakhstan	13.63	13.22	12.62	13.63	
21	B	Michelle Hastick	Canada	x	13.54	13.34	13.54	
22	B	Anja Valant	Slovenia	13.16	x	12.96	13.16	
	B	Viktoriya Brigadnaya	Turkmenistan	x	x	x	NM	
	A	Carlota Castrejana	Spain				DNS	

=== Final ===
Rank	Athlete	Nationality	#1	#2	#3	#4	#5	#6	Result	Notes
1st place, gold medalist(s)	Tatyana Lebedeva	Russia	15.11	14.93	x	x	x	15.25	15.25	WL
2nd place, silver medalist(s)	Françoise Mbango Etone	Cameroon	14.26	14.43	x	14.23	14.44	14.60	14.60	
3rd place, bronze medalist(s)	Tereza Marinova	Bulgaria	14.36	14.58	14.33	14.12	14.54	14.57	14.58	
4	Magdelín Martínez	Italy	14.52	13.83	14.04	x	14.29	14.28	14.52	
5	Heli Koivula	Finland	13.70	13.85	14.14	x	14.05	14.28	14.28	SB
6	Cristina Nicolau	Romania	x	14.09	14.10	14.17	13.94	12.32	14.17	
7	Ashia Hansen	Great Britain	14.00	x	13.76	14.10	13.95	14.07	14.10	
8	Trecia Smith	Jamaica	13.75	13.92	11.11	x	13.85	x	13.92	
9	Olga Bolshova	Moldova	x	13.79	13.86				13.86	
10	Olena Hovorova	Ukraine	x	13.85	x				13.85	
11	Camilla Johansson	Sweden	13.71	13.84	13.71				13.84	
12	Natallia Safronava	Belarus	13.65	13.43	13.82				13.82	
