= 2004 IAAF World Indoor Championships – Women's triple jump =

The Women's triple jump event at the 2004 IAAF World Indoor Championships was held on March 5–6.

== Medalists ==
Gold	Silver	Bronze
Tatyana Lebedeva; Russia	Yamilé Aldama; Sudan	Hrysopiyi Devetzi; Greece

== Results ==
=== Qualification ===
Qualifying performance 14.30 (Q) or 8 best performers (q) advanced to the final.

Rank	Group	Athlete	Nationality	#1	#2	#3	Result	Notes
1	A	Magdelín Martínez	Italy	14.81			14.81	Q, NR
2	A	Tatyana Lebedeva	Russia	14.71			14.71	Q
3	A	Mabel Gay	Cuba	X	14.19	14.57	14.57	Q, PB
4	B	Trecia Smith	Jamaica	14.57			14.57	Q, NR
5	B	Yamilé Aldama	Sudan	14.49			14.49	Q
6	A	Adelina Gavrilă	Romania	14.48			14.48	Q
6	B	Hrysopiyi Devetzi	Greece	14.48			14.48	Q
8	B	Simona La Mantia	Italy	14.27	14.45		14.45	Q, PB
9	B	Olena Hovorova	Ukraine	14.32			14.32	Q
10	B	Baya Rahouli	Algeria	14.14	14.22	14.31	14.31	Q, =NR
11	A	Natallia Safronava	Belarus	14.07	14.06	14.30	14.30	Q
12	B	Françoise Mbango Etone	Cameroon	14.30			14.30	Q, SB
13	A	Olga Vasdeki	Greece	13.99	14.25	X	14.25	
14	A	Huang Qiuyan	China	14.24	X	13.55	14.24	SB
15	B	Mariana Solomon	Romania	14.13	13.88	13.94	14.13	
16	A	Tereza Marinova	Bulgaria	13.85	14.13	13.83	14.13	SB
17	A	Carlota Castrejana	Spain	13.89	12.90	14.11	14.11	
18	B	Natalia Kilpeläinen-Back	Finland	13.91	13.61	14.02	14.02	
19	A	Heli Koivula Kruger	Finland	X	X	13.95	13.95	
20	B	Anastasiya Juravleva	Uzbekistan	13.92	X	–	13.92	NR
21	A	Šárka Kašpárková	Czech Republic	13.87	13.81	X	13.87	
22	A	Kéné Ndoye	Senegal	13.63	13.77	12.92	13.77	
23	B	Camilla Johansson	Sweden	13.76	X	X	13.76	
24	A	Yuliana Perez	United States	12.88	13.43	13.50	13.50	
25	B	Nicole Mladenis	Australia	13.31	13.12	X	13.31	AR
26	B	Tatyana Bocharova	Kazakhstan	13.22	X	13.24	13.24	
	B	Yelena Oleynikova	Russia	X	X	X	NM	

=== Final ===
Rank	Athlete	Nationality	#1	#2	#3	#4	#5	#6	Result	Notes
1st place, gold medalist(s)	Tatyana Lebedeva	Russia	15.16	15.25	–	15.15	–	15.36	15.36	WR
2nd place, silver medalist(s)	Yamilé Aldama	Sudan	X	14.90	X	13.04	14.79	14.50	14.90	AR
3rd place, bronze medalist(s)	Hrysopiyi Devetzi	Greece	14.02	14.23	14.65	14.73	14.40	X	14.73	
4	Trecia Smith	Jamaica	X	14.70	14.68	X	14.71	14.51	14.71	NR
5	Magdelín Martínez	Italy	14.67	14.50	14.50	14.50	14.63	X	14.67	
6	Françoise Mbango Etone	Cameroon	14.62	14.17	14.19	14.27	14.08	14.59	14.62	SB
7	Adelina Gavrilă	Romania	14.62	14.32	X	14.45	X	14.19	14.62	SB
8	Olena Hovorova	Ukraine	14.39	X	14.49	14.59	14.54	X	14.59	SB
9	Mabel Gay	Cuba	14.13	14.20	14.49				14.49	
10	Baya Rahouli	Algeria	14.19	13.99	14.12				14.19	
11	Simona La Mantia	Italy	14.09	13.97	14.14				14.14	
12	Natallia Safronava	Belarus	14.00	13.97	X				14.00	
