= 1999 World Championships in Athletics – Women's triple jump =

Women's Triple Jump event at the 1999 World Championships

These are the official results of the Women's Triple Jump event at the 1999 World Championships in Seville, Spain. There were a total number of 26 participating athletes, with the final held on Tuesday 24 August 1999.

== Medalists ==
Gold	Paraskevi Tsiamita; Greece (GRE)
Silver	Yamilé Aldama; Cuba (CUB)
Bronze	Olga Vasdeki; Greece (GRE)

== Schedule ==
- All times are Central European Time (UTC+1)

Qualification Round
Group A	Group B
22.08.1999 – 19:00h	22.08.1999 – 19:00h
Final Round
24.08.1999 – 19:45h

== Abbreviations ==
- All results shown are in metres

Q	automatic qualification
q	qualification by rank
DNS	did not start
NM	no mark
WR	world record
AR	area record
NR	national record
PB	personal best
SB	season best

== Qualification ==
- Held on Sunday 22 August 1999 with the mark set at 14.20 metres

RANK	GROUP A	DISTANCE
1.	Paraskevi Tsiamita (GRE)	15.07 m
2.	Iva Prandzheva (BUL)	14.39 m
3.	Oksana Rogova (RUS)	14.30 m
4.	Yamilé Aldama (CUB)	14.29 m
5.	Adelina Gavrilă (ROM)	14.20 m
6.	Françoise Mbango Etone (CMR)	14.12 m
7.	Eva Dolezalová (CZE)	14.11 m
8.	Ren Ruiping (CHN)	13.90 m
9.	Natalya Klimovets-Sofronova (BLR)	13.89 m
10.	Stacey Bowers (USA)	13.58 m
11.	Inessa Kravets (UKR)	13.49 m
12.	Anja Valant (SLO)	13.06 m
—	Suzette Lee (JAM)	DNS

RANK	GROUP B	DISTANCE
1.	Cristina Nicolau (ROM)	14.47 m
2.	Baya Rahouli (ALG)	14.30 m
3.	Ashia Hansen (GBR)	14.28 m
4.	Olga Vasdeki (GRE)	14.27 m
5.	Tatyana Lebedeva (RUS)	14.26 m
6.	Šárka Kašpárková (CZE)	14.22 m
7.	Olena Hovorova (UKR)	14.21 m
8.	Miao Chunqing (CHN)	13.92 m
9.	Kéné Ndoye (SEN)	13.90 m
10.	Viktoriya Brigadnaya (TKM)	13.84 m
11.	Wu Lingmei (CHN)	13.83 m
12.	Heli Koivula (FIN)	13.33 m
—	Concepción Paredes (ESP)	NM

== Final ==
RANK	FINAL	DISTANCE
	Paraskevi Tsiamita (GRE)	14.88 m
	Yamilé Aldama (CUB)	14.61 m
	Olga Vasdeki (GRE)	14.61 m
4.	Tatyana Lebedeva (RUS)	14.55 m
5.	Iva Prandzheva (BUL)	14.54 m
6.	Šárka Kašpárková (CZE)	14.54 m
7.	Olena Hovorova (UKR)	14.47 m
8.	Cristina Nicolau (ROM)	14.38 m
9.	Oksana Rogova (RUS)	14.16 m
10.	Baya Rahouli (ALG)	14.00 m
11.	Adelina Gavrilă (ROM)	13.87 m
12.	Ashia Hansen (GBR)	13.39 m
