= 2003 IAAF World Indoor Championships – Women's triple jump =

The women's triple jump event at the 2003 IAAF World Indoor Championships was held on March 14–15.

== Medalists ==
Gold	Silver	Bronze
Ashia Hansen; Great Britain	Françoise Mbango Etone; Cameroon	Kéné Ndoye; Senegal

== Results ==
=== Qualification ===
Qualifying perf. 14.20 (Q) or 8 best performers (q) advanced to the Final.

Rank	Group	Athlete	Nationality	#1	#2	#3	Result	Notes
1	B	Ashia Hansen	Great Britain	14.61			14.61	Q
2	B	Françoise Mbango Etone	Cameroon	14.10	14.39		14.39	Q
3	A	Kéné Ndoye	Senegal	13.64	14.33		14.33	Q, NR
4	A	Baya Rahouli	Algeria	13.64	14.27		14.27	Q, NR
5	B	Anna Pyatykh	Russia	13.85	14.18	14.09	14.18	q
6	B	Adelina Gavrilă	Romania	14.13	14.00	14.14	14.14	q
7	A	Carlota Castrejana	Spain	13.61	14.10	13.99	14.10	q
8	B	Magdelín Martínez	Italy	14.09	14.09	14.07	14.09	q
9	B	Tatyana Lebedeva	Russia	13.74	14.09	13.78	14.09	
10	A	Tereza Marinova	Bulgaria	13.49	14.09	13.77	14.09	
11	B	Hrysopiyi Devetzi	Greece	13.39	13.81	13.93	13.93	
12	B	Olga Vasdeki	Greece	X	13.84	13.87	13.87	
13	A	Trecia Smith	Jamaica	13.44	X	13.66	13.66	
14	A	Olga Lidia Cepero	Cuba	13.51	13.54	X	13.54	PB
15	A	Alina Dinu	Romania	13.51	13.54	X	13.44	
16	A	Huang Qiuyan	China	12.89	12.46	13.23	13.23	

=== Final ===
Rank	Athlete	Nationality	#1	#2	#3	#4	#5	#6	Result	Notes
1st place, gold medalist(s)	Ashia Hansen	Great Britain	14.77	X	14.56	14.62	15.01	X	15.01	WL
2nd place, silver medalist(s)	Françoise Mbango Etone	Cameroon	14.88	14.35	14.57	14.24	X	14.73	14.88	AR
3rd place, bronze medalist(s)	Kéné Ndoye	Senegal	14.26	14.37	14.33	14.33	14.33	14.72	14.72	NR
4	Anna Pyatykh	Russia	14.32	X	14.14	X	14.35	X	14.35	
5	Magdelín Martínez	Italy	13.94	14.10	14.26	14.18	14.12	14.32	14.32	
6	Carlota Castrejana	Spain	13.99	13.81	14.04	13.86	14.11	14.32	14.32	NR
7	Baya Rahouli	Algeria	14.17	14.22	14.14	14.10	14.31	13.98	14.31	NR
8	Adelina Gavrilă	Romania	13.36	13.92	X	13.81	–	–	13.92	
