= 2002 European Athletics Indoor Championships – Women's triple jump =

The women's triple jump event at the 2002 European Athletics Indoor Championships was held on March 1–2.

== Medalists ==
Gold	Silver	Bronze
Tereza Marinova; Bulgaria	Ashia Hansen; Great Britain	Yelena Oleynikova; Russia

== Results ==
=== Qualification ===
Qualifying perf. 14.00 (Q) or 8 best performers (q) advanced to the Final.

Rank	Athlete	Nationality	#1	#2	#3	Result	Note
1	Tereza Marinova	Bulgaria	13.96	14.42		14.42	Q
2	Ashia Hansen	Great Britain	14.30			14.30	Q
3	Yelena Oleynikova	Russia	X	14.27		14.27	Q
4	Cristina Nicolau	Romania	13.63	13.94	13.78	13.94	q
5	Marija Martinović	Yugoslavia	13.55	13.87	X	13.87	q
6	Nadezhda Bazhenova	Russia	13.80	12.87	13.83	13.83	q
7	Irina Vasilyeva	Russia	13.73	13.75	13.51	13.75	q
8	Carlota Castrejana	Spain	13.70	13.56	–	13.70	q
9	Anja Valant	Slovenia	X	X	13.64	13.64	
10	Heli Koivula	Finland	X	13.53	13.63	13.63	
11	Adelina Gavrilă	Romania	12.78	13.21	13.56	13.56	
12	Dana Velďáková	Slovakia	13.35	13.12	13.45	13.45	
13	Amy Zongo	France	13.33	X	13.26	13.33	
14	Gianoula Kafetzi	Greece	13.13	13.31	13.13	13.31	
15	Gudrun Fischbacher	Austria	13.03	X	13.29	13.29	
16	Chrisopigi Devetzi	Greece	13.24	X	X	13.24	
17	Olivia Wöckinger	Austria	13.16	13.21	X	13.21	
18	Virginija Petkevičienė	Lithuania	12.66	13.02	12.79	13.02	
19	Yuliya Kolesnikova	Azerbaijan	X	12.40	X	12.40	

=== Final ===
Rank	Athlete	Nationality	#1	#2	#3	#4	#5	#6	Result	Note
1st place, gold medalist(s)	Tereza Marinova	Bulgaria	14.25	14.81	X	X	X	X	14.81	
2nd place, silver medalist(s)	Ashia Hansen	Great Britain	X	14.36	14.71	X	14.42	14.54	14.71	
3rd place, bronze medalist(s)	Yelena Oleynikova	Russia	14.05	13.92	14.30	12.23	X	14.19	14.30	
4	Nadezhda Bazhenova	Russia	12.73	13.92	14.20	12.26	X	X	14.20	
5	Cristina Nicolau	Romania	13.93	X	14.09	14.11	X	X	14.11	
6	Marija Martinović	Yugoslavia	X	X	13.84	14.00	13.97	13.90	14.00	
7	Irina Vasilyeva	Russia	13.40	13.68	13.50	13.79	13.76	13.82	13.82	
8	Carlota Castrejana	Spain	13.68	13.60	13.57	13.42	13.74	13.60	13.74	
