= 2001 IAAF World Indoor Championships – Women's triple jump =

The women's triple jump event at the 2001 IAAF World Indoor Championships was held on March 11.

== Results ==
| Rank | Athlete | Nationality | #1 | #2 | #3 | #4 | #5 | #6 | Result | Notes |
|---|---|---|---|---|---|---|---|---|---|---|
| 1st place, gold medalist(s) | Tereza Marinova | Bulgaria | 14.91 | X | X | 14.68 | X | X | 14.91 | PB |
| 2nd place, silver medalist(s) | Tatyana Lebedeva | Russia | 14.08 | 14.29 | 14.53 | X | 14.85 | 14.47 | 14.85 | |
| 3rd place, bronze medalist(s) | Tiombe Hurd | United States | 13.92 | X | X | 14.19 | X | X | 14.19 | PB |
| 4 | Olga Bolşova | Moldova | 14.17 | X | 14.09 | 12.02 | 13.90 | 13.95 | 14.17 | NR |
| 5 | Oksana Rogova | Russia | 13.73 | 14.00 | 14.17 | 13.75 | 14.02 | 13.97 | 14.17 | |
| 6 | Cristina Nicolau | Romania | 13.49 | 13.55 | 14.05 | 14.00 | 13.90 | 13.91 | 14.05 | |
| 7 | Anja Valant | Slovenia | 13.73 | 13.84 | 13.45 | 13.65 | 13.81 | X | 13.84 | |
| 8 | Adelina Gavrilă | Romania | 13.72 | 13.77 | X | 13.62 | X | 13.67 | 13.77 | SB |
