= 2002 European Athletics Championships – Women's triple jump =

Women's triple jump at the European Athletics Championships

The women's triple jump at the 2002 European Athletics Championships were held at the Olympic Stadium on August 8–10.

== Medalists ==
Gold	Silver	Bronze
Ashia Hansen; Great Britain	Heli Koivula; Finland	Yelena Oleynikova; Russia

== Results ==
=== Qualification ===
Qualification: Qualification Performance 14.10 (Q) or at least 12 best performers advance to the final.

Rank	Group	Athlete	Nationality	#1	#2	#3	Result	Notes
1	B	Magdelin Martínez	Italy				14.30	Q
2	A	Ashia Hansen	Great Britain				14.22	Q
3	B	Yelena Oleynikova	Russia				14.15	Q
4	B	Barbara Lah	Italy				14.11	Q, SB
5	B	Hrysopiyi Devetzi	Greece				14.06	q
6	B	Cristina Nicolau	Romania				14.02	q
7	B	Heli Koivula	Finland				13.98	q
8	B	Olga Bolshova	Moldova				13.96	q
9	A	Carlota Castrejana	Spain	13.49	13.69	13.91	13.91	q
10	A	Anna Pyatykh	Russia				13.90	q
11	A	Irina Vasilyeva	Russia				13.89	q
12	B	Mihaela Gindila	Romania				13.87	q
13	B	Olena Hovorova	Ukraine				13.86	
14	A	Biljana Mitrović	Yugoslavia				13.78	PB
14	B	Dana Velďáková	Slovakia				13.78	
16	A	Alina Dinu	Romania				13.76	
17	A	Silvia Biondini	Italy				13.76	
18	A	Liliana Zagacka	Poland				13.69	
19	A	Anja Valant	Slovenia				13.53	
20	A	Camilla Johansson	Sweden				13.45	
21	A	Zita Ajkler	Hungary				13.34	
22	A	Virginija Petkevičienė	Lithuania				13.14	
23	B	Andreja Ribac	Slovenia				13.05	
	B	Marija Martinović	Yugoslavia				DNS	

=== Final ===
Rank	Athlete	Nationality	#1	#2	#3	#4	#5	#6	Result	Notes
1st place, gold medalist(s)	Ashia Hansen	Great Britain	14.54	14.60	X	X	X	15.00w	15.00w	
2nd place, silver medalist(s)	Heli Koivula	Finland	14.83w	14.67w	X	14.24	14.07	X	14.83w	
3rd place, bronze medalist(s)	Yelena Oleynikova	Russia	X	14.21	14.40	14.52	X	14.54	14.54	
4	Mihaela Gindila	Romania	14.18	14.14	14.43	X	14.41	14.06	14.43	PB
5	Cristina Nicolau	Romania	14.19	13.99	14.39	14.27	14.23	X	14.39	
6	Magdelin Martínez	Italy	X	13.98	14.27w	14.09	14.25	X	14.27w	
7	Hrysopiyi Devetzi	Greece	X	14.15	X	13.51	X	13.81	14.15	
8	Anna Pyatykh	Russia	X	13.34	14.08	X	11.98	X	14.08	
9	Olga Bolshova	Moldova	14.03	13.71	13.64				14.03	
10	Barbara Lah	Italy	X	14.02	X				14.02	
11	Carlota Castrejana	Spain	13.58	13.82	13.11				13.82	
12	Irina Vasilyeva	Russia	13.55	13.44	X				13.55	
