= 1996 World Junior Championships in Athletics – Women's triple jump =

The women's triple jump event at the 1996 World Junior Championships in Athletics was held in Sydney, Australia, at International Athletic Centre on 24 and 25 August.

== Medalists ==
Gold	Tereza Marinova; Bulgaria
Silver	Cristina Nicolau; Romania
Bronze	Adelina Gavrilă; Romania

== Results ==
=== Final ===
25 August

Rank	Name	Nationality	Attempts						Result	Notes
Rank	Name	Nationality	1	2	3	4	5	6	Result	Notes
1st place, gold medalist(s)	Tereza Marinova	Bulgaria	14.33 (w: +0.8 m/s)	14.15 (w: +1.8 m/s)	14.18 (w: +0.9 m/s)	14.62 (w: +1.0 m/s)	-	-	14.62 (w: +1.0 m/s)	
2nd place, silver medalist(s)	Cristina Nicolau	Romania	x	x	13.40 (w: +1.4 m/s)	13.50 (w: +0.2 m/s)	13.64 (w: +0.4 m/s)	x	13.64 (w: +0.4 m/s)	
3rd place, bronze medalist(s)	Adelina Gavrilă	Romania	13.50 (w: +0.9 m/s)	13.16 (w: +1.4 m/s)	11.98 (w: -0.2 m/s)	13.11 (w: +1.1 m/s)	x	x	13.50 (w: +0.9 m/s)	
4	Oksana Rogova	Russia	13.39 (w: +1.4 m/s)	13.47 (w: +1.6 m/s)	13.30 (w: +0.9 m/s)	13.39 (w: +0.6 m/s)	13.49 (w: -0.4 m/s)	11.62 (w: -1.0 m/s)	13.49 (w: -0.4 m/s)	
5	Anja Valant	Slovenia	13.37 (w: +1.1 m/s)	13.17 (w: +0.6 m/s)	13.49 (w: -0.2 m/s)	x	13.38 (w: +0.6 m/s)	13.37 (w: -0.6 m/s)	13.49 (w: -0.2 m/s)	
6	Wu Xueli	China	x	12.93 (w: +0.4 m/s)	13.42 (w: -0.3 m/s)	13.24 (w: +0.2 m/s)	13.17 (w: -0.1 m/s)	13.31 (w: +0.3 m/s)	13.42 (w: -0.3 m/s)	
7	Liliana Zagacka	Poland	13.15 (w: +1.1 m/s)	x	12.53 (w: -0.2 m/s)	x	12.84 (w: -0.5 m/s)	13.12 (w: +0.2 m/s)	13.15 (w: +1.1 m/s)	
8	Chrystelle Le Gouguec	France	13.06 (w: +1.7 m/s)	12.98 (w: +0.8 m/s)	12.81 (w: +1.8 m/s)	12.27 (w: +0.5 m/s)	12.94 (w: -0.1 m/s)	13.11 (w: +1.1 m/s)	13.11 (w: +1.1 m/s)	
9	Chukwuwete Olomina	Sweden	13.04 (w: +1.7 m/s)	x	13.06 (w: +1.3 m/s)	12.95 (w: -0.4 m/s)	11.39 (w: -1.0 m/s)	x	13.06 (w: +1.3 m/s)	
10	Baya Rahouli	Algeria	12.97 (w: +1.0 m/s)	x	x				12.97 (w: +1.0 m/s)	
11	Eva Dolezalová	Czech Republic	12.62 (w: +1.2 m/s)	12.78 (w: +0.9 m/s)	12.70 (w: -0.6 m/s)				12.78 (w: +0.9 m/s)	
12	Carmen Miller	Australia	11.40 (w: +1.4 m/s)	x	12.38 (w: +0.6 m/s)				12.38 (w: +0.6 m/s)	

=== Qualifications ===
24 Aug

==== Group A ====
Rank	Name	Nationality	Attempts			Result	Notes
Rank	Name	Nationality	1	2	3	Result	Notes
1	Cristina Nicolau	Romania	13.48 (w: +0.8 m/s)	-	-	13.48 (w: +0.8 m/s)	Q
2	Anja Valant	Slovenia	x	13.25 (w: +0.4 m/s)	-	13.25 (w: +0.4 m/s)	Q
3	Carmen Miller	Australia	12.96 (w: +0.6 m/s)	13.18 (w: -0.2 m/s)	12.90 (w: 0.0 m/s)	13.18 (w: -0.2 m/s)	q
4	Liliana Zagacka	Poland	13.11 (w: +1.4 m/s)	13.05 (w: +1.6 m/s)	12.58 (w: +1.7 m/s)	13.11 (w: +1.4 m/s)	q
5	Baya Rahouli	Algeria	x	13.11 (w: +1.1 m/s)	x	13.11 (w: +1.1 m/s)	q
6	Eva Dolezalová	Czech Republic	12.58 (w: -0.7 m/s)	12.64 (w: +1.2 m/s)	12.98 (w: -0.9 m/s)	12.98 (w: -0.9 m/s)	q
7	Chukwuwete Olomina	Sweden	x	x	12.95 (w: +1.0 m/s)	12.95 (w: +1.0 m/s)	q
8	Hanna Pennanen	Finland	12.72 (w: +0.7 m/s)	12.82 (w: +1.7 m/s)	12.62 (w: 0.0 m/s)	12.82 (w: +1.7 m/s)	
9	Nicole Gamble	United States	12.41 (w: -0.3 m/s)	12.64 (w: +0.8 m/s)	12.76 (w: +0.9 m/s)	12.76 (w: +0.9 m/s)	
10	Katja Glasl	Germany	12.36 (w: +1.1 m/s)	12.59 (w: +0.4 m/s)	12.41 (w: +0.5 m/s)	12.59 (w: +0.4 m/s)	
11	Marija Martinović	Yugoslavia	12.43 (w: -0.1 m/s)	x	12.57 (w: +1.7 m/s)	12.57 (w: +1.7 m/s)	
12	Kozue Murayama	Japan	12.34 (w: 0.0 m/s)	x	12.39 (w: 0.0 m/s)	12.39 (w: 0.0 m/s)	
13	Christine Brown	Jamaica	12.33 (w: +1.4 m/s)	12.10 (w: -0.9 m/s)	12.39 w (w: +3.1 m/s)	12.39 w (w: +3.1 m/s)	

==== Group B ====
Rank	Name	Nationality	Attempts			Result	Notes
Rank	Name	Nationality	1	2	3	Result	Notes
1	Tereza Marinova	Bulgaria	14.20 (w: +1.6 m/s)	-	-	14.20 (w: +1.6 m/s)	Q
2	Oksana Rogova	Russia	13.46 w (w: +3.9 m/s)	-	-	13.46 w (w: +3.9 m/s)	Q
3	Wu Xueli	China	13.17 (w: +0.5 m/s)	13.33 (w: -0.3 m/s)	-	13.33 (w: -0.3 m/s)	Q
4	Adelina Gavrilă	Romania	13.30 (w: +0.6 m/s)	-	-	13.30 (w: +0.6 m/s)	Q
5	Chrystelle Le Gouguec	France	13.19 (w: +1.8 m/s)	13.04 (w: -0.1 m/s)	13.11 (w: +1.8 m/s)	13.19 (w: +1.8 m/s)	q
6	Dahlia Ingram	United States	12.70 (w: +2.0 m/s)	12.34 (w: +0.3 m/s)	12.93 (w: +0.3 m/s)	12.93 (w: +0.3 m/s)	
7	Sandra Stube	Germany	12.54 (w: +1.3 m/s)	12.75 (w: +1.1 m/s)	12.88 (w: +1.6 m/s)	12.88 (w: +1.6 m/s)	
8	Kristel Berendsen	Estonia	12.26 (w: +1.6 m/s)	x	12.69 w (w: +2.4 m/s)	12.69 w (w: +2.4 m/s)	
9	Jessica Hartikainen	Finland	12.33 (w: +0.7 m/s)	x	12.63 w (w: +3.1 m/s)	12.63 w (w: +3.1 m/s)	
10	Viktoriya Brigadnaya	Turkmenistan	x	11.94 (w: -0.4 m/s)	12.39 (w: +0.9 m/s)	12.39 (w: +0.9 m/s)	
11	Stephany Reid	Canada	12.35 (w: +1.3 m/s)	12.07 (w: +0.6 m/s)	12.30 (w: +1.3 m/s)	12.35 (w: +1.3 m/s)	
12	Kéné Ndoye	Senegal	x	12.10 (w: +0.9 m/s)	x	12.10 (w: +0.9 m/s)	

== Participation ==
According to an unofficial count, 25 athletes from 21 countries participated in the event.

- Algeria (1)
- Australia (1)
- Bulgaria (1)
- Canada (1)
- China (1)
- Czech Republic (1)
- Estonia (1)
- Finland (2)
- France (1)
- Germany (2)
- Jamaica (1)
- Japan (1)
- Poland (1)
- Romania (2)
- Russia (1)
- Senegal (1)
- Slovenia (1)
- Sweden (1)
- Turkmenistan (1)
- United States (2)
- Yugoslavia (1)
