= List of Algerian records in athletics =

The following are the national records in athletics in Algeria maintained by its national athletics federation: Fédération Algérienne d'Athlétisme (FAA).

== Outdoor ==
Key to tables: Awaiting ratification Record not kept by FAA Not ratified or later rescinded by FAA

=== Men ===
Event	Record	Athlete	Date	Meet	Place	Ref.
60 m	6.83 NWI	Mahmoud Hammoudi	26 March 2021	Algeria Winter Championships "Abdelkader Hammani"	Algiers, Algeria	
100 m	10.29 (+1.6 m/s)	Skander Djamil Athmani	28 July 2017	Algerian Championships	Algiers, Algeria	
150 m	15.38 (−0.4 m/s)	Skander Djamil Athmani	17 March 2017		Biskra, Algeria	
150 m	15.08 NWI	Skander Djamil Athmani	17 March 2017		Biskra, Algeria	
200 m	20.53 (+1.9 m/s)	Soufiane Bouhada	16 July 2016	Algerian Championships	Algiers, Algeria	
300 m	33.09	Izzeddine Raouti	28 April 2026	Simbine Classic	Pretoria, South Africa	
400 m	45.13	Malik Louahla	4 August 2001	World Championships	Edmonton, Canada	
600 m	1:14.36	Djamel Sedjati	11 March 2023	Athletics Central North West Championships	Potchefstroom, South Africa	
800 m	1:42.61	Taoufik Makhloufi	15 August 2016	Olympic Games	Rio de Janeiro, Brazil	
800 m	1:41.56	Djamel Sedjati	7 July 2024	Meeting de Paris	Paris, France	
800 m	1:41.46	Djamel Sedjati	12 July 2024	Herculis	Fontvieille, Monaco	
1000 m	2:13.08	Taoufik Makhloufi	1 July 2015	Meeting Stanislas	Tomblaine, France	
1500 m	3:27.37	Noureddine Morceli	12 July 1995		Nice, France	
Mile	3:44.39	Noureddine Morceli	5 September 1993	IAAF Grand Prix	Rieti, Italy	
Mile (road)	4:08.32	Abdallah Harek	26 April 2025	Adizero: Road to Records	Herzogenaurach, Germany	
2000 m	4:46.88	Ali Saïdi-Sief	19 June 2001		Strasbourg, France	
3000 m	7:25.02	Ali Saïdi-Sief	18 August 2000	Herculis	Fontvieille, Monaco	
5000 m	12:50.86	Ali Saïdi-Sief	30 June 2000	Golden Gala	Rome, Italy	
5 km (road)	13:40	Said Amri	11 February 2024	Monaco Run 5K	Monaco	
10,000 m	27:58.03	Khoudir Aggoune	6 June 2008		Saint-Maur-des-Fossés, France	
10 km (road)	28:01	Mohammed Benyettou	25 February 2024	10K Facsa Castellón	Castellón de la Plana, Spain	
15 km (road)	43:14+	Mohammed Benyettou	15 September 2024	Copenhagen Half Marathon	Copenhagen, Denmark	
One hour	19093.1 m +	Kamel Kohil	16 May 1994		Algiers, Algeria	
20,000 m	1:00:12	Kamel Kohil	16 May 1994		Algiers, Algeria	
20 km (road)	57:43+	Mohammed Benyettou	15 September 2024	Copenhagen Half Marathon	Copenhagen, Denmark	
Half marathon	1:00:55	Mohammed Benyettou	15 September 2024	Copenhagen Half Marathon	Copenhagen, Denmark	
25 km (road)	1:17:25	Mohamed Youkmane	19 June 1989		Sallanches, France	
30 km (road)	1:35:20	Bagdad Rachim	25 March 2007		Hamilton, Canada	
Marathon	2:09:54	Rachid Ziar	7 April 2002	Paris Marathon	Paris, France	
110 m hurdles	13.37 (−0.6 m/s)	Amine Bouanani	17 July 2022	World Championships	Eugene, United States	
300 m hurdles	35.52	Abdelmalik Lahoulou	17 March 2017		Biskra, Algeria	
400 m hurdles	48.39	Abdelmalik Lahoulou	28 September 2019	World Championships	Doha, Qatar	
2000 m steeplechase	5:18.38	Azzedine Brahmi	17 June 1992		Verona, Italy	
3000 m steeplechase	8:10.23	Laïd Bessou	18 August 2000	Herculis	Fontvieille, Monaco	
High jump	2.34 m	Abderrahmane Hammad	14 July 2000	African Championships	Algiers, Algeria	
Pole vault	5.50 m	Hichem Cherabi	14 June 2015	Himmelsstürmer Cup	Zweibrücken, Germany	
Long jump	8.26 m (+0.7 m/s)	Issam Nima	28 July 2007		Zaragoza, Spain	
Triple jump	17.67 m (+0.4 m/s)	Yasser Triki	19 June 2026	Doha Diamond League	Doha, Qatar	
Shot put	19.07 m	Jean-Marie Djébaïli	2 June 1976		Saint-Maur, France	
Discus throw	64.54 m	Oussama Khenoussi	1 May 2025	Arab Championships	Oran, Algeria	
Hammer throw	74.76 m	Hakim Toumi	8 August 1998		Algiers, Algeria	
Javelin throw	70.20 m	Ahmed Mahour Bacha	7 August 1986		Tunis, Tunisia	
Decathlon	8521 pts	Larbi Bourrada	17–18 August 2016	Olympic Games	Rio de Janeiro, Brazil	
Decathlon	100m (wind) / Long jump (wind) / Shot put / High jump / 400m / 110m H (wind) / Discus / Pole vault / Javelin / 1500m; 10.75 (−0.4 m/s) / 7.52 m (+0.4 m/s) / 13.78 m / 2.10 m / 47.98 / 14.15 (+0.4 m/s) / 42.39 m / 4.60 m / 66.49 m / 4:14.60					
5000 m walk (track)	19:05	Abdelouaheb Ferguène	15 August 1992		Germany	
10,000 m walk (track)	39:46.14	Moussa Aouanouk	3 June 2000		Tunis, Tunisia	
10 km walk (road)	42:09	Mohamed Ameur	14 March 2015		Biskra, Algeria	
Hour walk (track)	14275 m	Abdelouaheb Ferguène	3 May 1992		Neuilly, France	
20,000 m walk (track)	1:23:34	Moussa Aouanouk	11 June 2000		Algiers, Algeria	
20 km walk (road)	1:22:51	Abdelwahab Ferguène	23 August 1992		Hildesheim, Germany	
20 km walk (road)	1:21:09	Ismail Benhammouda	16 May 2026	African Championships	Accra, Ghana	
30,000 m walk (track)	2:25:27.1+	Abdelouaheb Ferguène	25 March 1984		Toulouse, France	
50,000 m walk (track)	4:21:44.5	Abdelouaheb Ferguène	25 March 1984		Toulouse, France	
50 km walk (road)	4:19:15	H’Mimed Rahouli	12 March 1987		Boumerdès, Algeria	
4 × 100 m relay	39.89	Algeria; Mahmoud Hammoudi; Ali Bouguesba; Skander Djamil Athmani; Soufiane Bouhadda	12 August 2014	African Championships	Marrakech, Morocco	
4 × 400 m relay	3:02.78	Algeria; Samir-Adel Louahla; Kamel Talhaoui; Ahmed Aichaoui; Malik Louahla	18 June 1997	Mediterranean Games	Bari, Italy	

=== Women ===
Event	Record	Athlete	Date	Meet	Place	Ref.
60 m	7.6 NWI	Amina Touati	26 March 2021	Algeria Winter Championships "Abdelkader Hammani"	Algiers, Algeria	
100 m	11.61 (−1.5 m/s)	Souheir Bouali	8 July 2007		Algiers, Algeria	
100 m	11.61	Souheir Bouali	18 June 2008		Tlemcen, Algeria	
100 m	11.51 (±0.0 m/s)	Baya Rahouli	17 June 1999		Algiers, Algeria	
150 m	18.31 (+0.3 m/s)	Meriem Boulehsa	26 March 2021	Algeria Winter Championships "Abdelkader Hammani"	Algiers, Algeria	
200 m	23.38	Yasmina Azzizi	16 May 1992		Brescia, Italy	
300 m	37.95	Souheir Bouali	11 March 2016		Béjaïa, Algeria	
400 m	52.98	Zahra Bouras	1 June 2009		Rehlingen, Germany	
600 m	1:29.35	Meriem Boulehsa	26 March 2021	Algeria Winter Championships "Abdelkader Hammani"	Algiers, Algeria	
800 m	1:58.72	Hassiba Boulmerka	17 July 1991	Golden Gala	Rome, Italy	
1000 m	2:34.60	Nouria Mérah-Benida	17 July 1999		Nice, France	
1500 m	3:55.30	Hassiba Boulmerka	8 August 1992	Olympic Games	Barcelona, Spain	
Mile	4:20.79	Hassiba Boulmerka	6 July 1991	Bislett Games	Oslo, Norway	
3000 m	8:47.99	Souad Aït Salem	22 June 2006		Algiers, Algeria	
5000 m	15:07.49	Souad Aït Salem	8 July 2006		Saint Denis, France	
5 km (road)	16:18	Souad Aït Salem	24 August 2002	Carrera Nocturna Alcalde de Águilas	Águilas, Spain	
10,000 m	32:13.15	Souad Aït Salem	23 July 2004		Mataró, Spain	
10 km (road)	32:13+	Souad Aït Salem	8 October 2006	World Road Running Championships	Debrecen, Hungary	
15 km (road)	49:13+	Souad Aït Salem	8 October 2006	World Road Running Championships	Debrecen, Hungary	
20 km (road)	1:06:11	Souad Aït Salem	8 October 2006	World Road Running Championships	Debrecen, Hungary	
Half marathon	1:09:15	Souad Aït Salem	24 February 2008	Roma-Ostia Half Marathon	Rome-Ostia, Italy	
30 km (road)	1:43:10+	Souad Aït Salem	18 March 2007	Rome City Marathon	Rome, Italy	
Marathon	2:25:08	Souad Aït Salem	18 March 2007	Rome City Marathon	Rome, Italy	
100 m hurdles	13.02 (−0.8 m/s)	Yasmina Azzizi	16 May 1992		Brescia, Italy	
300 m hurdles	42.25	Loubna Benhadja	26 March 2021	Algeria Winter Championships "Abdelkader Hammani"	Algiers, Algeria	
400 m hurdles	56.66	Houria Moussa	22 June 2006		Algiers, Algeria	
2000 m steeplechase	6:49.0 h	Samira Lathamna	6 August 2006	Tunisia-Algeria-France-Spain Junior Match	Tunis, Tunisia	
3000 m steeplechase	9:25.90	Amina Betiche	17 May 2017	Islamic Solidarity Games	Baku, Azerbaijan	
High jump	1.85 m	Sara Bouaoudia	1 July 2005		Almería, Spain	
Pole vault	3.70 m	Sonia Halliche	19 July 2006		Algiers, Algeria	
Pole vault	3.70 m	Sonia Halliche	5 July 2010		Algiers, Algeria	
Pole vault	3.70 m	Sonia Halliche	28 July 2011	Algerian Championships	Algiers, Algeria	
Pole vault	4.10 m	Lynda Méziani	1999			
Pole vault	3.70 m	Lynda Méziani	7 May 2000		Franconville, France	
Long jump	6.70 m (−0.1 m/s)	Baya Rahouli	5 September 1999	Rieti IAAF Grand Prix	Rieti, Italy	
Triple jump	14.98 m (+0.2 m/s)	Baya Rahouli	1 July 2005	Mediterranean Games	Almería, Spain	
Shot put	16.16 m	Yasmina Azzizi	13 July 1995		Annaba, Algeria	
Discus throw	53.54 m	Aïcha Dahmous	25 June 1987		Algiers, Algeria	
Hammer throw	70.82 m	Zahra Tatar	5 April 2025	Mauritian U18 Championships	Bambous, Mauritius	
Javelin throw	47.92 m	Faïza Kadri	20 July 2005		Algiers, Algeria	
Javelin throw	62.16 m (Old design)	Samia Djemaa	19 June 1987		Algiers, Algeria	
Heptathlon	6392 pts	Yasmina Azzizi	26–27 August 1991	World Championships	Tokyo, Japan	
Heptathlon	100m H (wind) / High jump / Shot put / 200m (wind) / Long jump (wind) / Javelin / 800m; 13.34 (+1.5 m/s) / 1.79 m / 15.40 m / 24.32 (−0.5 m/s) / 6.15 m (+0.3 m/s) / 44.62 m / 2:17.17					
3000 m walk (track)	13:13.1	Dounia Kara	3 May 1996		Algiers, Algeria	
5 km walk (road)	23:15.8	Dounia Kara	July 1996		Yaoundé, Cameroon	
10,000 m walk (track)	46:48.0	Dounia Kara	21 April 1995		Remchi, Algeria	
10 km walk (road)	47:21.74	Souad Azzi	5 April 2019	Arab Championships	Cairo, Egypt	
20 km walk (road)	1:33:39	Souad Azzi	4 February 2022		Algiers, Algeria	
4 × 100 m relay	46.83	Groupement Sportif des Pétroliers; S. N. Remaoune; S. Louahla; T. R. Belabiod; K. F. Bourahla	7 July 2012		Algiers, Algeria	
4 × 100 m relay	46.7 h	?	1 July 1993		Annaba, Algeria	
4 × 100 m relay	46.57	Hamel Rahil; Benkaci Malak; Troubia Nesrine Safaa; Naît Abdelaziz Nadia	13 August 2025	Algerian Championships	Algiers, Algeria	
4 × 400 m relay	3:39.70	Algeria; Houria Moussa; Sarah Bouaoudia; Nahida Touhami; Sarah Arrous	10 August 2002	African Championships	Radès, Tunisia	

== Indoor ==
=== Men ===
Event	Record	Athlete	Date	Meet	Place	Ref.
50 m	5.95	Mustapha Kamel Selmi	12 December 1985		Lucca, Italy,	
60 m	6.80	Mustapha Kamel Selmi	26 February 1988		Zaragoza, Spain	
60 m	6.80	Mustapha Kamel Selmi	21 January 1989		Prague, Czechoslovakia	
60 m	6.70	Mustapha Kamel Selmi	1987		?	
200 m	21.24	Malik Louahla	5 March 1999	World Championships	Maebashi, Japan	
300 m	34.35	Miloud Rahmani	15 February 2009	BW-Bank-Meeting	Karlsruhe, Germany	
400 m	46.71	Djabir Saïd-Guerni	13 February 2002		Eaubonne, France	
500 m	1:03.64	Ahmed Belkessam	19 January 1985		Turin, Italy	
800 m	1:44.67	Mohamed Ali Gouaned	8 February 2026	Meeting Metz Moselle Athlélor Crédit Mutuel	Metz, France	
1000 m	2:15.26	Noureddine Morceli	22 February 1992	Aviva Indoor Grand Prix	Birmingham, United Kingdom	
1500 m	3:34.16	Noureddine Morceli	28 February 1991		Seville, Spain	
Mile	3:50.81	Noureddine Morceli	8 February 1991		East Rutherford, United States	
Mile	3:50.70	Noureddine Morceli	20 February 1993	Aviva Indoor Grand Prix	Birmingham, United Kingdom	
2000 m	4:59.98	Ali Saïdi-Sief	5 February 1999		Budapest, Hungary	
3000 m	7:36.25	Ali Saïdi-Sief	6 February 2000	Sparkassen Cup	Stuttgart, Germany	
Two miles	8:29.75	Khoudir Aggoune	23 February 2003		Lille, France	
5000 m	13:31.02	Aïssa Belaout	6 February 1994	Sparkassen Cup	Stuttgart, Germany	
60 m hurdles	7.73	Athmane Hadj Lazib	29 February 2012		Metz, France	
60 m hurdles	7.72	Athmane Hadj Lazib	25 February 2011		Metz, France	
400 m hurdles	52.69	Miloud Rahmani	27 January 2018	Meeting Elite en salle de l'Eure	Val-de-Reuil, France	
2000 m steeplechase	5:31.45	Zerrifi Abdelhamid	13 February 2011	Indoor Flanders Meeting	Ghent, Belgium	
High jump	2.27 m	Othmane Belfaa	18 January 1985	World Indoor Games	Paris, France	
High jump	2.27 m	Othmane Belfaa	6 February 1985		Florence, Italy	
High jump	2.28 m	Younes Ayachi	6 February 2026	BKK Freundenburg High Jump Meeting	Weinheim, Germany	
Pole vault	5.30 m	Samy Si Mohamed	30 January 1994		Paris, France	
Long jump	7.88 m	Issam Nima	12 March 2010	World Championships	Doha, Qatar	
Triple jump	17.12 m	Yasser Triki	23 February 2019	SEC Championships	Fayetteville, United States	
Shot put	17.55 m	Jean-Marie Djébaili	16 January 1977		Paris, France	
Weight throw	18.87 m	Hakim Toumi	15 February 1986		Paris, France	
Heptathlon	5911 pts	Larbi Bouraada	27–28 February 2010	French Championships	Paris, France	
Heptathlon	60m / Long jump / Shot put / High jump / 60m H / Pole vault / 1000m; 6.89 / 7.34 m / 14.00 m / 1.92 m / 8.05 / 4.60 m / 2:39.86					
Octathlon	5890 pts	Mahmoud Ait Hamou	25–26 February 1988		Sofia, Bulgaria	
5000 m walk	21:41.49	Saïd Touche	19 January 2020		Reims, France	
4 × 400 m relay	3:14.29	Algeria; Faiçal Cherifi; Faiçal Doukhi; Hocine Lamada; Larbi Laroui	14 March 2009		Athens, Greece	

=== Women ===
Event	Record	Athlete	Date	Meet	Place	Ref.
50 m	6.45	Baya Rahouli	28 January 2000		Aubagne, France	
60 m	7.45	Baya Rahouli	23 February 1999		Eaubonne, France	
200 m	24.52	Nadia Abdou	26 January 1997		Bordeaux, France	
400 m	54.44	Loubna Benhadja	1 March 2025	Conference USA Championships	Lynchburg, United States	
800 m	2:00.75	Nouria Mérah-Benida	13 February 1999		Dortmund, Germany	
1000 m	2:39.22	Nouria Mérah-Benida	7 February 1999		Stuttgart, Germany	
1500 m	4:07.94	Nouria Mérah-Benida	18 February 2000		Chemnitz, Germany	
Mile	4:26.50	Nouria Mérah-Benida	6 February 2000		Liévin, France	
2000 m	5:46.67	Nouria Mérah-Benida	13 February 2000		Liévin, France	
3000 m	9:14.21 (Note: By World Athletics source; 9:14.00 by federation source.)	Nouria Mérah-Benida	20 February 2000	CGU Indoor Grand Prix	Birmingham, United Kingdom	
3000 m	9:05.25	Samira Chellah	25 February 2006		Aubiere, France	
3000 m	9:08.77	Nouria Mérah-Benida	26 February 2006	KBC Indoor	Ghent, Belgium	
60 m hurdles	8.28	Yasmina Azzizi-Kettab	15 February 1992		Berlin, Germany	
High jump	1.75 m	Zacera Zaaboub	14 February 1992		Berlin, Germany	
High jump	1.75 m	Yasmina Azzizi	14 January 1995		Ghent, Belgium	
High jump	1.76 m	Katiba Korbaa	9 February 2007		Aubiere, France	
High jump	1.76 m	Katiba Korbaa	24 February 2007		Paris, France	
Pole vault	3.22 m	Israa Kaim	23 February 2019		Clermont-Ferrand, France	
Long jump	5.95 m	Yasmina Azzizi-Kettab	15 February 1992		Berlin, Germany	
Triple jump	14.31 m	Baya Rahouli	15 March 2003	World Championships	Birmingham, United Kingdom	
Triple jump	14.31 m	Baya Rahouli	5 March 2004	World Championships	Budapest, Hungary	
Shot put	14.58 m	Yasmina Azzizi	9 February 1992		Nogent-sur-Oise, France	
Pentathlon	4424 pts	Yasmina Azzizi-Kettab	15 February 1992		Berlin, Germany	
Pentathlon	60m H / High jump / Shot put / Long jump / 800m; 8.28 / 1.72 m / 14.47 m / 5.95 m / 2:20.26					
3000 m walk	16:27.28	Ghania Amzal	5 January 2020		Liévin, France	
4 × 400 m relay						
