= Athletics at the 2000 Summer Olympics – Women's triple jump =

Women's triple jump at the Games of the XXVII Olympiad
- Pictogram for athletics
- Venue: Stadium Australia
- Date: 22–24 September
- Competitors: 27 from 22 nations
- Winning distance: 15.20

Medalists
1st place, gold medalist(s)		Tereza Marinova	Bulgaria
2nd place, silver medalist(s)		Tatyana Lebedeva	Russia
3rd place, bronze medalist(s)		Olena Hovorova	Ukraine

The Women's Triple Jump event at the 2000 Summer Olympics as part of the athletics program was held at the Olympic Stadium.

The top twelve athletes from the three jumps in qualifying progressed through to the final where the qualifying distances are scrapped and they start afresh with another three jumps. After these the top eight athletes carry their record forward and then have a further three attempts to decide the gold medalist.

== Schedule ==
'All times are Australian Eastern Standard Time (UTC+10)

Date	Time	Round
Friday, 22 September 2000	20:00	Qualification
Sunday, 24 September 2000	19:40	Final

== Records ==
Prior to this competition, the existing world record and Olympic recordwere as follows:

World record	Inessa Kravets (UKR)	15.50	Gothenburg, Sweden	10 August 1995
Olympic record	Inessa Kravets (UKR)	15.33	Atlanta, United States	31 July 1996

== Results ==
=== Qualifying round ===
Rule: Qualifying standard 14.25 (Q) or at least 12 best qualified (q).

Place	Athlete	Nation	Group	Mark	Qual	Record
1	Tatyana Lebedeva	Russia	B	14.91	Q	
2	Olena Hovorova	Ukraine	B	14.76	Q	
3	Tereza Marinova	Bulgaria	A	14.73	Q	
4	Anja Valant	Slovenia	B	14.36	Q	
5	Sarka Kasparkova	Czech Republic	B	14.34	Q	SB
6	Ashia Hansen	Great Britain	A	14.29	Q	SB
7	Yamile Aldama	Cuba	A	14.27	Q	
8	Olga-Anastasi Vasdeki	Greece	B	14.26	Q	SB
9	Oksana Rogova	Russia	A	14.25	Q	
10	Cristina Elena Nicolau	Romania	A	14.14	q	
11	Françoise Mbango	Cameroon	B	14.13	q	
12	Baya Rahouli	Algeria	B	13.98	q	
13	Viktoriya Brigadnaya	Turkmenistan	A	13.96		
14	Kene Ndoye	Senegal	A	13.94		
15	Natallia Safronava	Belarus	A	13.91		
16	Mariya Dimitrova	Bulgaria	A	13.87		
17	Camilla Johansson	Sweden	A	13.87		
18	Carlota Castrejana	Spain	B	13.76		
19	Inna Lasovskaya	Russia	B	13.75		
20	Olena Khlusovych	Ukraine	A	13.60		
21	Yelena Parfyonova	Kazakhstan	A	13.50		
22	Marija Martinovic	FR Yugoslavia	A	13.49		
23	Keisha Spencer	Jamaica	B	13.49		
24	Luciana Santos	Brazil	B	13.48		
25	Nicole Gamble	United States	A	13.33		
26	Ren Ruiping	China	B	13.16		
27	Anna Tarassova	Kazakhstan	B	13.11		

== Final ==
Place	Athlete	Nation	Mark	Notes
1st place, gold medalist(s)	Tereza Marinova	Bulgaria	15.20	NR
2nd place, silver medalist(s)	Tatyana Lebedeva	Russia	15.00	
3rd place, bronze medalist(s)	Olena Hovorova	Ukraine	14.96	PB
4	Yamile Aldama	Cuba	14.30	
5	Baya Rahouli	Algeria	14.17	
6	Cristina Elena Nicolau	Romania	14.17	
7	Olga-Anastasi Vasdeki	Greece	14.15	
8	Oksana Rogova	Russia	13.97	
9	Anja Valant	Slovenia	13.59	
10	Françoise Mbango	Cameroon	13.53	
11	Ashia Hansen	Great Britain	13.44	
	Sarka Kasparkova	Czech Republic	NM	
