= Šárka Kašpárková =

Czech former track and field athlete (born 1971)

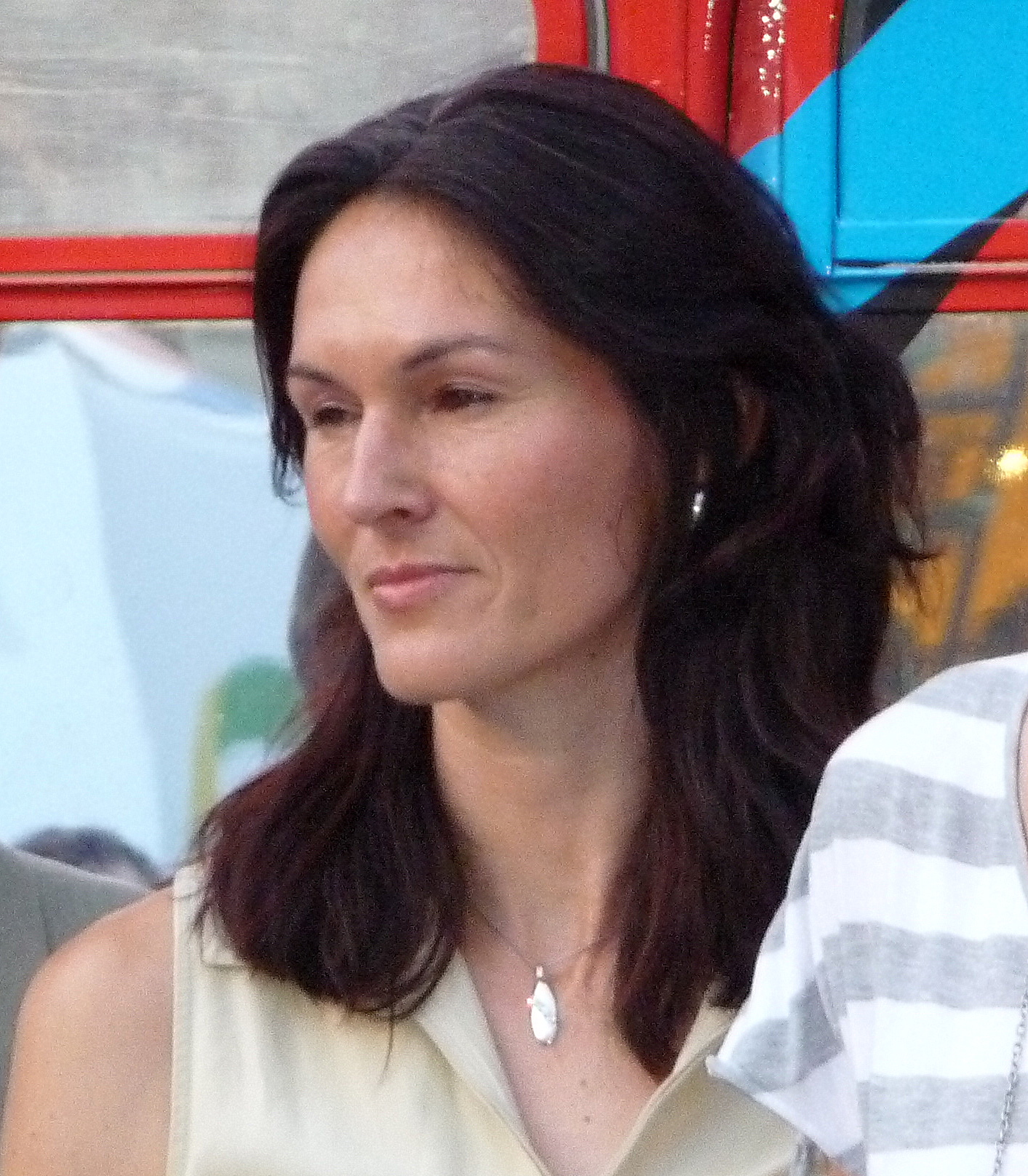

Personal information
- Born: 20 May 1971 (age 55) Karviná, Czechoslovakia

Sport
- Sport: Track and field
Medal record
Representing Czech Republic
Olympic Games
Bronze medal – third place	1996 Atlanta	Triple jump
World Championships
Gold medal – first place	1997 Athens	Triple jump
World Indoor Championships
Bronze medal – third place	1997 Paris	Triple jump
Bronze medal – third place	1999 Maebashi	Triple jump
European Championships
Silver medal – second place	1998 Budapest	Triple jump
European Indoor Championships
Silver medal – second place	1996 Stockholm	Triple jump
Silver medal – second place	1998 Valencia	Triple jump
Summer Universiade
Gold medal – first place	1995 Fukuoka	Triple jump
Silver medal – second place	1993 Buffalo	Triple jump

Šárka Kašpárková (Czech pronunciation: [ˈʃaːrka ˈkaʃpaːrkovaː], born 20 May 1971) is a Czech former track and field athlete who specialised in the triple jump.

She attended her first Summer Olympics in 1992, participating in the high jump. She switched to the triple jump when it was given world championships status and won an Olympic bronze medal in the discipline at the 1996 Atlanta Games. She won another bronze at the 1997 IAAF World Indoor Championships and improved further by becoming the world champion at the 1997 World Championships in Athletics – her winning jump of 15.20 m was the second-farthest ever at the time.

She won both the indoor and outdoor silver medals at the European Athletics Championships. She won the bronze at the 1999 IAAF World Indoor Championships with her personal best indoor jump of 14.87 m, but failed to reach the podium at any major championships after that point, suffering a sharp decline in form.

== Career ==
=== Early career ===
At 1.86 metres tall, Kašpárková started her professional athletics career as a high jumper and finished sixth at the 1988 World Junior Championships in Athletics. She won the bronze medal in the 1989 European Athletics Junior Championships, and she went on to participate in the women's high jump at the 1992 Barcelona Olympics for Czechoslovakia. Her last period as a high jumper also brought her best performance – she jumped a personal best of 1.95 m in Banská Bystrica in early 1993.

When the female triple jump was introduced to the IAAF competitions, she moved to this discipline as one of the first competitors. She represented Europe in the triple jump at the 1992 IAAF World Cup, finishing in fifth place. She took part in the very first world championship event at the 1993 World Championships in Athletics and finished in seventh with a personal best jump of 14.16 m. She failed to break 14 metres the following year at the 1994 European Championships and had to settle for sixth place. She came close to the medals the following season with a fourth-place performance at the 1995 IAAF World Indoor Championships. She reverted to being out of medal contention at the 1995 World Championships in Athletics and 1995 IAAF Grand Prix Final.

=== Olympic and world medals ===
She became the triple jump champion at the 1995 Summer Universiade. She won her first major medals soon after, taking the silver at the 1996 European Indoor Athletics Championships and winning her first Olympic medal for the Czech Republic with a bronze in the triple jump at the 1996 Summer Olympics. She confirmed her ability in the 1997 season, first winning a bronze at the 1997 IAAF World Indoor Championships, and then winning the World Championships with a national record jump of 15.20 m – this was the best jump that season and it made her the second best athlete in the event after Inessa Kravets at the time. A silver medal at the 1997 IAAF Grand Prix Final brought an end to a successful season.

She won a second European indoor silver at the 1998 Championships, finishing behind Ashia Hansen who jumped 15.16 m, and went on to take another silver later that season at the European Championships outdoors. She retained her indoor bronze at the 1999 IAAF World Indoor Championships with a personal best indoor jump of 14.87 m in Maebashi. She failed to retain her world title, however, at the 1999 World Championships in Athletics and could only manage 14.54 m for sixth place.

=== Decline ===
Kašpárková suffered a marked decline after 1999 and she never jumped beyond 14.40 m after that point. Her mark of 14.34 m was enough to qualify for 2000 Olympic triple jump final, but she faulted three times and finished last. She took part in the 2003 World Championships in Athletics, 2004 IAAF World Indoor Championships and 2004 Summer Olympics, but each time she did not manage to jump more than 14 metres and was eliminated in the qualifiers.

She had a reversal of fortunes at the 2005 European Indoor Athletics Championships and took fourth place with a season's best of 14.34 m. She did not continue this form outdoors, however, and did not make the final at either the 2005 World Championships in Athletics or 2006 European Athletics Championships.

== Personal life ==
Kašpárková is in a relationship with her former coach Michal Pogány. Together they have a daughter, Tereza.

== Personal bests ==
She also competed in the 100 metres hurdles and long jump on limited occasions.

Event	Best (m)	Venue	Date
Triple jump (outdoor)	15.20	Athens, Greece	4 August 1997
Triple jump (indoor)	14.87	Maebashi, Japan	7 March 1999
High jump (outdoor)	1.92	Kerkrade, Netherlands	30 May 1992
High jump (indoor)	1.95	Banská Bystrica, Czech Republic	27 January 1993
Long jump	6.56	Prague, Czech Republic	20 June 1998

== Competition record ==
Year	Competition	Venue	Position	Event	Notes
Representing Czechoslovakia
1988	World Junior Championships	Sudbury, Canada	6th	High jump	1.85 m
1989	European Junior Championships	Varaždin, Yugoslavia	3rd	High jump	1.91 m
1992	European Indoor Championships	Genoa, Italy	4th	Triple jump	13.73 m
1992	Olympic Games	Barcelona, Spain	25th (q)	High jump	1.88 m
Representing the Czech Republic
1993	World Indoor Championships	Toronto, Canada	7th	Triple jump	13.81 m
1993	Universiade	Buffalo, United States	2nd	Triple jump	14.00 m (w)
1993	World Championships	Stuttgart, Germany	7th	Triple jump	14.16 m
1994	European Indoor Championships	Paris, France	4th	Triple jump	14.46 m
1994	European Championships	Helsinki, Finland	6th	Triple jump	13.98 m
1995	World Indoor Championships	Barcelona, Spain	4th	Triple jump	14.25 m
1995	World Championships	Gothenburg, Sweden	13th (q)	Triple jump	13.94 m
1995	Universiade	Fukuoka, Japan	1st	Triple jump	14.20 m
1996	European Indoor Championships	Stockholm, Sweden	2nd	Triple jump	14.50 m
1996	Olympic Games	Atlanta, United States	3rd	Triple jump	14.98 m
1997	World Indoor Championships	Paris, France	3rd	Triple jump	14.66 m
1997	World Championships	Athens, Greece	1st	Triple jump	15.20 m
1998	European Indoor Championships	Valencia, Spain	2nd	Triple jump	14.76 m
1998	Goodwill Games	Uniondale, United States	1st	Triple jump	14.76 m
1998	European Championships	Budapest, Hungary	2nd	Triple jump	14.53 m
1999	World Indoor Championships	Maebashi, Japan	3rd	Triple jump	14.87 m
1999	World Championships	Seville, Spain	6th	Triple jump	14.54 m
2000	Olympic Games	Sydney, Australia	5th (q)	Triple jump	14.34 m
2003	World Championships	Paris, France	24th (q)	Triple jump	13.75 m
2004	World Indoor Championships	Budapest, Hungary	21st (q)	Triple jump	13.87 m
2004	Olympic Games	Athens, Greece	26th (q)	Triple jump	13.79 m
2005	European Indoor Championships	Madrid, Spain	4th	Triple jump	14.34 m
2005	World Championships	Helsinki, Finland	21st (q)	Triple jump	13.69 m
2006	European Championships	Gothenburg, Sweden	20th (q)	Triple jump	13.39 m
