= 1999 European Athletics U23 Championships – Women's triple jump =

The women's triple jump event at the 1999 European Athletics U23 Championships was held in Gothenburg, Sweden, at Ullevi on 1 August 1999.

== Medalists ==
Gold	Cristina Nicolau; Romania
Silver	Oksana Rogova; Russia
Bronze	Adelina Gavrilă; Romania

== Results ==
=== Final ===
1 August

Rank	Name	Nationality	Attempts						Result	Notes
Rank	Name	Nationality	1	2	3	4	5	6	Result	Notes
1st place, gold medalist(s)	Cristina Nicolau	Romania	14.70 (w: 1.3 m/s)	x	14.30 (w: 1.5 m/s)	x	x	x	14.70 (w: 1.3 m/s)	CR
2nd place, silver medalist(s)	Oksana Rogova	Russia	14.59 (w: 1.1 m/s)	14.65 w (w: 2.6 m/s)	14.01 (w: 1.4 m/s)	14.45 (w: -0.1 m/s)	x	x	14.65 w (w: 2.6 m/s)	
3rd place, bronze medalist(s)	Adelina Gavrilă	Romania	13.79 (w: 1.4 m/s)	x	14.37 (w: 1.0 m/s)	13.98 (w: 0.3 m/s)	13.67 (w: -0.3 m/s)	x	14.37 (w: 1.0 m/s)	
4	Anja Valant	Slovenia	x	14.29 (w: 1.0 m/s)	13.95 (w: 1.2 m/s)	13.47 (w: 1.0 m/s)	13.07 (w: -0.6 m/s)	13.15 (w: 1.5 m/s)	14.29 (w: 1.0 m/s)	
5	Eva Doležalová	Czech Republic	13.70 (w: 1.5 m/s)	x	13.29 (w: -0.5 m/s)	x	14.19 (w: 0.3 m/s)	x	14.19 (w: 0.3 m/s)	
6	Irina Vasilyeva	Russia	13.65 (w: 1.4 m/s)	11.76 (w: 1.3 m/s)	x	13.44 (w: 1.1 m/s)	13.09 (w: 1.7 m/s)	13.25 (w: 0.4 m/s)	13.65 (w: 1.4 m/s)	
7	Cosmina Boaja	Romania	13.57 (w: -0.7 m/s)	13.43 (w: 0.4 m/s)	x	13.59 (w: 2.0 m/s)	x	13.32 (w: 1.1 m/s)	13.59 (w: 2.0 m/s)	
8	Marija Martinović	Yugoslavia	x	x	13.14 (w: 1.3 m/s)	x	13.10 w (w: 2.5 m/s)	x	13.14 (w: 1.3 m/s)	
9	Ayşegül Baklacı	Turkey	12.95 (w: 0.4 m/s)	12.99 (w: 1.6 m/s)	x				12.99 (w: 1.6 m/s)	
10	Cecilia Rise	Norway	12.62 w (w: 2.2 m/s)	12.90 (w: 1.9 m/s)	12.86 (w: 1.5 m/s)				12.90 (w: 1.9 m/s)	
11	Karine Gredoire	France	12.45 (w: 0.4 m/s)	12.23 (w: 1.4 m/s)	12.68 (w: -0.1 m/s)				12.68 (w: -0.1 m/s)	
12	Hanna Pennanen	Finland	12.48 w (w: 2.1 m/s)	x	x				12.48 w (w: 2.1 m/s)	
13	Marie Ahlander	Sweden	x	x	12.41 (w: -0.2 m/s)				12.41 (w: -0.2 m/s)	
	Christelle Le Gouguec	France	x	x	x				NM	

== Participation ==
According to an unofficial count, 14 athletes from 10 countries participated in the event.

- Czech Republic (1)
- Finland (1)
- France (2)
- Norway (1)
- Romania (3)
- Russia (2)
- Slovenia (1)
- Sweden (1)
- Turkey (1)
- Yugoslavia (1)
