= Oksana Rogova =

Russian triple jumper

Oksana Aleksandrovna Rogova (Russian: Оксана Александровна Рогова; born 7 October 1978 in Tambov) is a Russian triple jumper. She represented Russia at the 2000 Summer Olympics, finishing eighth in the women's triple jump competition.

She won the silver medal at the 1999 European Athletics Under 23 Championships and she was the 2003 Summer Universiade champion in the triple jump. Her other significant medal in her career is a gold at the 2006 European Athletics Indoor Cup. She took part in the 1999 World Championships in Athletics, finishing in ninth position.

Her personal best jump is 14.59 metres, achieved in August 1999 in Gothenburg. However, she achieved 14.70 m indoors at a meeting in Volgograd in 2002.

== Achievements ==
Year	Competition	Venue	Position	Notes
Representing Russia
1996	World Junior Championships	Sydney, Australia	4th	13.49 m (wind: -0.4 m/s)
1999	European U23 Championships	Gothenburg, Sweden	2nd	14.65 m w (wind: 2.6 m/s)
1999	World Championships	Seville, Spain	9th	14.16 m
2000	Olympic Games	Sydney, Australia	8th	13.97 m
2001	World Indoor Championships	Lisbon, Portugal	5th	14.17 m
2003	Universiade	Daegu, South Korea	1st	14.16 m
2005	European Indoor Championships	Madrid, Spain	15th (q)	13.42 m
