= 1992 World Junior Championships in Athletics – Women's triple jump =

The women's triple jump event at the 1992 World Junior Championships in Athletics was held in Seoul, South Korea, at Olympic Stadium on 17 September.

== Medalists ==
Gold	Anja Vokuhl; Germany
Silver	Yaminoraidez Martínez; Cuba
Bronze	Yelena Govorova; Commonwealth of Independent States

== Results ==
=== Final ===
17 September

Rank	Name	Nationality	Attempts						Result	Notes
Rank	Name	Nationality	1	2	3	4	5	6	Result	Notes
1st place, gold medalist(s)	Anja Vokuhl	Germany	12.80 (w: +0.3 m/s)	12.75 (w: -0.4 m/s)	13.00 (w: -1.0 m/s)	13.23 (w: +0.3 m/s)	13.24 (w: +0.5 m/s)	13.47 (w: +0.1 m/s)	13.47 (w: +0.1 m/s)	
2nd place, silver medalist(s)	Yaminoraidez Martínez	Cuba	x	13.40 (w: -0.9 m/s)	13.20 (w: +0.1 m/s)	x	13.26 (w: -0.3 m/s)	13.42 (w: -0.5 m/s)	13.42 (w: -0.5 m/s)	
3rd place, bronze medalist(s)	Yelena Govorova	Commonwealth of Independent States	13.12 (w: +0.3 m/s)	x	12.79 (w: -0.3 m/s)	x	13.12 (w: 0.0 m/s)	13.29 (w: 0.0 m/s)	13.29 (w: 0.0 m/s)	
4	Tatyana Matyashova	Commonwealth of Independent States	x	x	13.01 (w: +0.3 m/s)	13.06 (w: -0.4 m/s)	x	13.12 (w: -0.3 m/s)	13.12 (w: -0.3 m/s)	
5	Olga Cepero	Cuba	13.05 (w: -0.3 m/s)	x	12.53 (w: -0.4 m/s)	12.97 (w: +0.1 m/s)	x	12.82 (w: -0.4 m/s)	13.05 (w: -0.3 m/s)	
6	Nadia Morandini	Italy	12.94 (w: -0.6 m/s)	12.56 (w: -0.5 m/s)	12.62 (w: -0.5 m/s)	12.47 (w: +0.3 m/s)	x	12.60 (w: +0.2 m/s)	12.94 (w: -0.6 m/s)	
7	Suzette Lee	Jamaica	12.59 (w: -0.2 m/s)	12.33 (w: +0.1 m/s)	12.83 (w: +0.4 m/s)	12.66 (w: -0.3 m/s)	12.76 (w: +0.1 m/s)	12.74 (w: +0.5 m/s)	12.83 (w: +0.4 m/s)	
8	Aurora Lario	Spain	12.29 (w: -1.1 m/s)	12.46 (w: -0.6 m/s)	12.67 (w: -0.5 m/s)	x	12.48 (w: +0.2 m/s)	12.35 (w: -0.1 m/s)	12.67 (w: -0.5 m/s)	
9	Leanne Wickham	Australia	11.99 (w: -0.6 m/s)	x	12.43 (w: +0.7 m/s)				12.43 (w: +0.7 m/s)	
10	Lisa Austin	United States	12.42 (w: -1.1 m/s)	x	12.34 (w: -0.5 m/s)				12.42 (w: -1.1 m/s)	
11	Kim Hyo-In	South Korea	x	11.83 (w: -0.1 m/s)	12.42 (w: -0.3 m/s)				12.42 (w: -0.3 m/s)	
12	Radoslava Stoykova	Bulgaria	12.14 (w: -0.1 m/s)	12.29 (w: 0.0 m/s)	12.33 (w: -0.3 m/s)				12.33 (w: -0.3 m/s)	
13	Kathleen Gutjahr	Germany	12.23 (w: -0.5 m/s)	11.94 (w: -1.6 m/s)	x				12.23 (w: -0.5 m/s)	
14	Bettina Leiss	Austria	12.01 (w: +0.3 m/s)	12.06 (w: -0.5 m/s)	x				12.06 (w: -0.5 m/s)	
15	Martha Koulorizou	Greece	x	x	11.94 (w: -0.8 m/s)				11.94 (w: -0.8 m/s)	

== Participation ==
According to an unofficial count, 15 athletes from 12 countries participated in the event.

- Australia (1)
- Austria (1)
- Bulgaria (1)
- Commonwealth of Independent States (2)
- Cuba (2)
- Germany (2)
- Greece (1)
- Italy (1)
- Jamaica (1)
- South Korea (1)
- Spain (1)
- United States (1)
