= Tatyana Lebedeva =

Russian triple jumper and long jumper

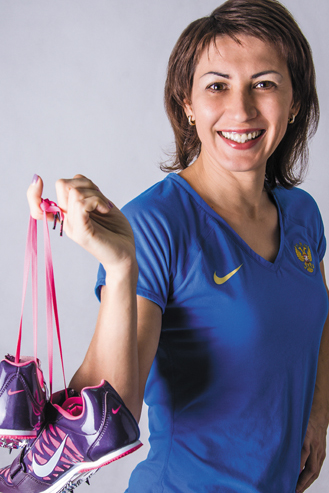
- Lebedeva in 2013

Personal information
- Born: 21 July 1976 (age 50) Sterlitamak, Bashkir ASSR, Soviet Union
- Height: 1.70 m (5 ft 7 in)
- Weight: 60 kg (132 lb)

Sport
- Country: Russia
- Sport: Athletics
- Events: Long jump, triple jump

Achievements and titles
- Personal bests: LJ – 7.33 m (2004); TJ – 15.36 m(i) (2004)
Medal record
Representing Russia
| Event | 1st | 2nd | 3rd |
|---|---|---|---|
| Olympic Games | 1 | 1 | 1 |
| World Championships | 3 | 1 | 0 |
| World Indoor Championships | 3 | 1 | 0 |
| European Championships | 1 | 0 | 0 |
| European Indoor Championships | 1 | 0 | 0 |
| World Junior Championships | 0 | 0 | 1 |
| Total | 9 | 3 | 2 |
Olympic Games
| Gold medal – first place | 2004 Athens | Long jump |
| Silver medal – second place | 2000 Sydney | Triple jump |
| Disqualified | 2008 Beijing | Triple jump |
| Disqualified | 2008 Beijing | Long jump |
| Bronze medal – third place | 2004 Athens | Triple jump |
World Championships
| Gold medal – first place | 2001 Edmonton | Triple jump |
| Gold medal – first place | 2003 Paris | Triple jump |
| Gold medal – first place | 2007 Osaka | Long jump |
| Silver medal – second place | 2007 Osaka | Triple jump |
| Disqualified | 2009 Berlin | Long jump |
World Indoor Championships
| Gold medal – first place | 2004 Budapest | Triple jump |
| Gold medal – first place | 2004 Budapest | Long jump |
| Gold medal – first place | 2006 Moscow | Triple jump |
| Silver medal – second place | 2001 Lisbon | Triple jump |
European Championships
| Gold medal – first place | 2006 Gothenburg | Triple jump |
European Indoor Championships
| Gold medal – first place | 2000 Ghent | Triple jump |
World Junior Championships
| Bronze medal – third place | 1994 Lisbon | Triple jump |
- Updated on 20 February 2014

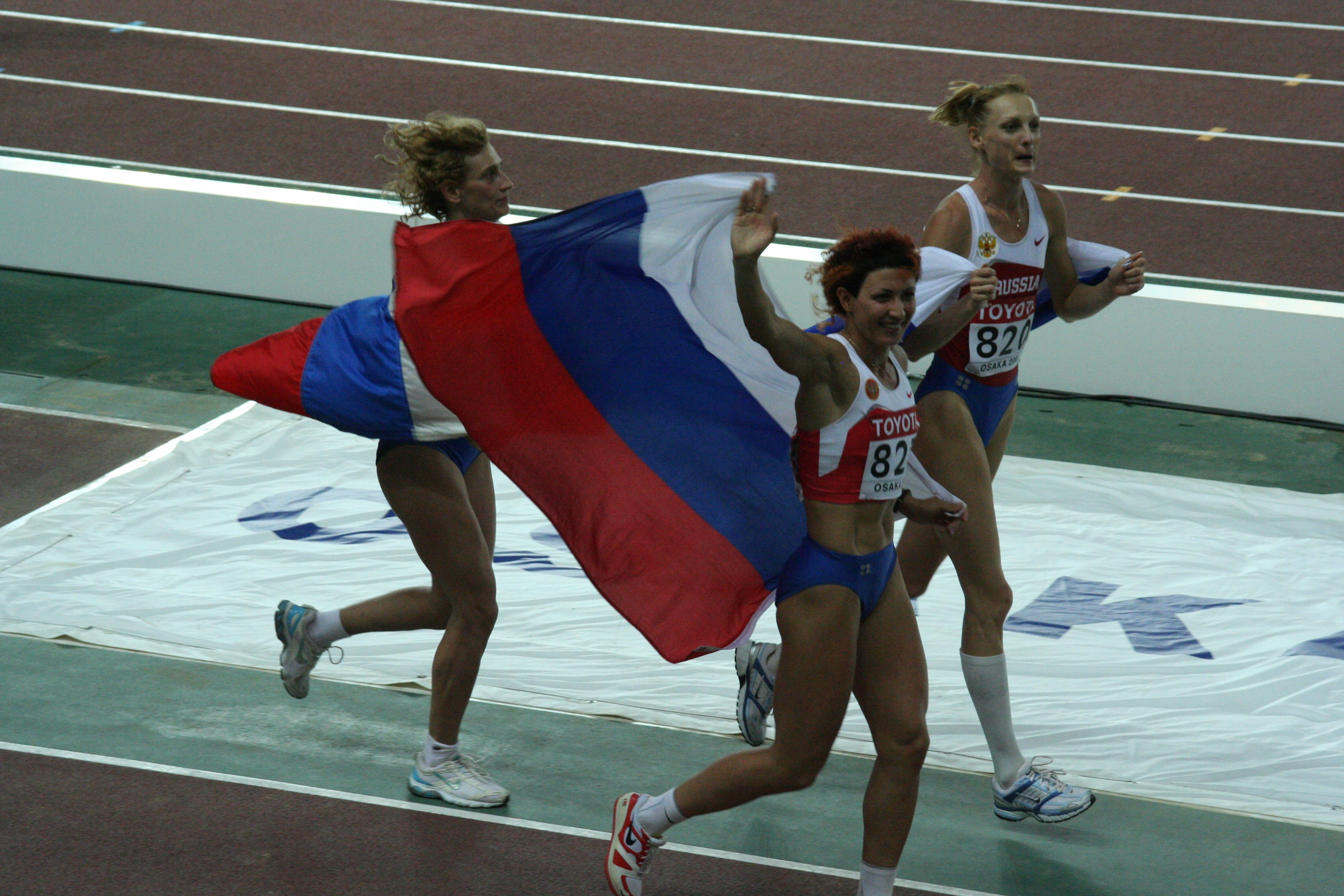
Celebrating victory in Osaka in 2007.

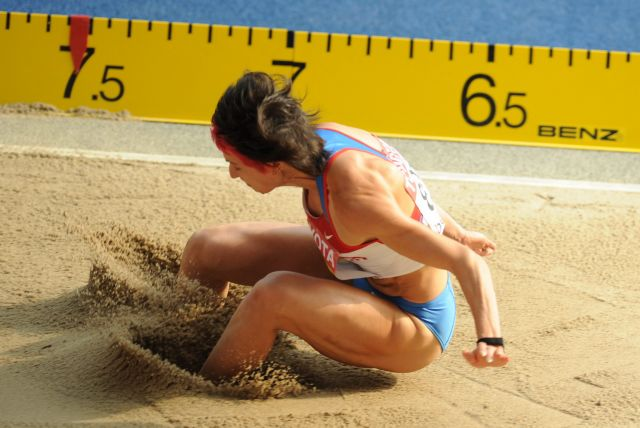
Lebedeva leaping at the Berlin World Championships in 2009.

Tatyana Romanovna Lebedeva (Russian: Татьяна Романовна Лебедева, born 21 July 1976) is a retired Russian track and field athlete who competes in both the long jump and triple jump events. She is one of the most successful athletes in the disciplines, having won gold medals at Olympic, world and European levels. She has a long jump best of 7.33 m and held the then indoor world record mark of 15.36 m in the triple jump. In 2017 she was banned for doping.

== Career ==
Her first successes came in the triple jump in 2000, when she won European Indoor gold medal and a silver at the 2000 Sydney Olympics. She became the World Champion the following year in addition to a silver medal at the world indoors. After retaining her triple jump title at the 2003 World Championships, she decided to take up the long jump as well. The move paid dividends: she broke the indoor world record in the triple jump at the 2004 World Indoor Championships and won a second gold in the long jump with a mark of 15.36. She won her first Olympic gold medal in the long jump event at the 2004 Athens Olympics and also won the bronze in the triple jump competition.

In 2005, she missed the World Championships due to injury, but became the sole winner of the IAAF Golden League jackpot, a bonus of US$1 million awarded to athletes who win their event at each of six designated European summer meets. That year, she concentrated on the triple jump.

Lebedeva excelled at the 2005 IAAF Golden League, receiving the entire jackpot prize of US$1 million. She became European champion for the first time with a win at the 2006 European Athletics Championships in the triple jump. Lebedeva reached the podium twice at the 2007 World Championships taking long jump gold and triple jump silver.

She won the long jump silver medal at the 2009 World Championships (her eighth medal on the world podium), although she could not match this form in the triple jump.

On 25 January 2017, the International Olympic Committee sanctioned Lebedeva for doping at the 2008 Olympic Games, as a result she lost her silver medals for both the long jump and triple jump events in that Games. Lebedeva appealed the IOC's decision to the Court of Arbitration for Sport, however on 26 July 2018, the IOC's decision was upheld.

== Personal life ==
In September 2002, Lebedeva and her husband Nikolay Matveev had their first daughter, Anastasiya. She announced that she was pregnant for a second time in 2010 (choosing to skip the 2011 season), and gave birth to a second daughter (Aleksandra) in November.

== Personal bests ==
| Type | Event | Best | Location | Date | Notes |
|---|---|---|---|---|---|
| Outdoor | Long jump | 7.33 m | Tula, Russia | 31 July 2004 | 8th of all time |
| Outdoor | Triple jump | 15.34 m | Heraklion, Greece | 4 July 2004 | 3rd of all time |
| Indoor | Long jump | 6.98 m | Budapest, Hungary | 7 March 2004 | |
| Indoor | Triple jump | 15.36 m | Budapest, Hungary | 6 March 2004 | |

- All information taken from IAAF profile.

== International competitions ==
Representing Russia
| Year | Competition | Venue | Position | Event | Result | Notes |
|---|---|---|---|---|---|---|
| 1994 | World Junior Championships | Lisbon, Portugal | 10th | Long jump | 6.22 m | wind: +1.9 m/s |
| 1994 | World Junior Championships | Lisbon, Portugal | 3rd | Triple jump | 13.62 m | wind: +0.7 m/s |
| 1998 | IAAF World Cup | Johannesburg, South Africa | 2nd | Triple jump | 14.36 m | |
| 1998 | Goodwill Games | New York City, United States | 2nd | Triple jump | 14.14 m | |
| 1998 | European Championships | Budapest, Hungary | 5th | Triple jump | 14.25 m | |
| 1999 | World Championships | Seville, Spain | 4th | Triple jump | 14.55 m | |
| 1999 | Grand Prix Final | Munich, Germany | 3rd | Triple jump | 14.66 m | |
| 2000 | Summer Olympics | Sydney, Australia | 2nd | Triple jump | 15.00 m | |
| 2000 | European Cup | Gateshead, United Kingdom | 1st | Triple jump | 14.98 m | |
| 2000 | European Indoor Championships | Ghent, Belgium | 1st | Triple jump | 14.68 m | |
| 2001 | World Championships | Edmonton, Canada | 1st | Triple jump | 15.25 m | |
| 2001 | World Indoor Championships | Lisbon, Portugal | 2nd | Triple jump | 14.85m | |
| 2001 | Goodwill Games | Brisbane, Australia | 1st | Triple jump | 14.58 m | |
| 2001 | European Cup | Bremen, Germany | 1st | Triple jump | 14.89 m | |
| 2003 | World Indoor Championships | Birmingham, United Kingdom | 9th (q2) | Triple jump | 14.09 m | |
| 2003 | World Championships | Paris, France | 1st | Triple jump | 15.18 m | |
| 2003 | World Athletics Final | Monaco | 1st | Triple jump | 15.13 m | |
| 2004 | Summer Olympics | Athens, Greece | 3rd | Triple jump | 15.14 m | |
| 2004 | Summer Olympics | Athens, Greece | 1st | Long jump | 7.07 m | |
| 2004 | World Indoor Championships | Budapest, Hungary | 1st | Triple jump | 15.36 m | WRi |
| 2004 | World Indoor Championships | Budapest, Hungary | 1st | Long jump | 6.98 m | |
| 2004 | World Athletics Final | Monaco | 2nd | Triple jump | 14.96 m | |
| 2005 | IAAF Golden League | Various | 1st | Triple jump | | Won US$1 million jackpot |
| 2006 | European Championships | Gothenburg, Sweden | 1st | Triple jump | 15.15 m | CR |
| 2007 | World Championships | Osaka, Japan | 1st | Long jump | 7.03 m | |
| 2007 | World Championships | Osaka, Japan | 2nd | Triple jump | 15.07 m | |
| 2008 | Summer Olympics | Beijing, China | DSQ (2nd) | Long jump | 7.03 m | |
| 2008 | Summer Olympics | Beijing, China | DSQ (2nd) | Triple jump | 15.32 m | |
| 2009 | World Championships | Berlin, Germany | DSQ (6th) | Triple jump | 14.37 m | |
| 2009 | World Championships | Berlin, Germany | DSQ (2nd) | Long jump | 6.97 m | |
| 2012 | Olympic Games | London, United Kingdom | 10th | Triple jump | 14.11 m | |

== National titles ==
- Russian Athletics Championships
  - Long jump: 2004
  - Triple jump: 1998, 1999, 2000, 2001
- Russian Indoor Athletics Championships
  - Long jump: 2004
  - Triple jump: 2000, 2001, 2003

== See also ==
- List of doping cases in athletics
- List of Olympic medalists in athletics (women)
- List of 2000 Summer Olympics medal winners
- List of 2004 Summer Olympics medal winners
- List of 2008 Summer Olympics medal winners
- List of stripped Olympic medals
- List of medal sweeps in Olympic athletics
- List of World Athletics Championships medalists (women)
- List of medal sweeps at the World Athletics Championships
- List of IAAF World Indoor Championships medalists (women)
- List of European Athletics Championships medalists (women)
- List of European Athletics Indoor Championships medalists (women)
- List of Russian sportspeople
- Long jump at the Olympics
- Triple jump at the Olympics
- Russia at the World Athletics Championships
- Doping at the Olympic Games
- Doping in Russia

Records
| Preceded by Ashia Hansen | Women's Triple Jump Indoor World Record Holder; 6 March 2004 – present | Succeeded by Incumbent |
Sporting positions
| Preceded by Maurren Maggi | Women's Long Jump Best Year Performance; 2004 | Succeeded by Irina Meleshina |
