= Athletics at the 1998 Commonwealth Games – Women's triple jump =

Women's triple jump at the Commonwealth Games

The women's triple jump event at the 1998 Commonwealth Games was held on 21 September in Kuala Lumpur.

This was the first time that this event was contested at the Commonwealth Games.

== Results ==
Rank	Name	Nationality	Result	Notes
1st place, gold medalist(s)	Ashia Hansen	England	14.32	CR
2nd place, silver medalist(s)	Françoise Mbango Etone	Cameroon	13.95	
3rd place, bronze medalist(s)	Connie Henry	England	13.94	
4	Natasha Gibson	Trinidad and Tobago	13.78	
5	Michelle Griffith	England	13.77	
6	Michelle Hastick	Canada	13.64	
