= Yelena Oleynikova =

Russian triple jumper

Yelena Oleynikova (Russian: Елена Олейниковаborn 9 December 1976 in Zernograd) is a retired Russian athlete who specialised in the triple jump. She won the bronze at the 2002 European Championships.

She has personal bests of 14.83 metres outdoors and 14.60 metres indoors, both from 2002.

== International competitions ==
Representing Russia
Year	Competition	Venue	Position	Event	Result	Notes
2001	World Championships	Edmonton, Canada	14th (q)	Triple jump	13.95 m	
2001	Universiade	Beijing, China	3rd	Triple jump	14.39 m	w
2001	Goodwill Games	Brisbane, Australia	5th	Triple jump	13.94 m	
2002	European Indoor Championships	Vienna, Austria	3rd	Triple jump	14.30 m	
2002	European Championships	Munich, Germany	3rd	Triple jump	14.54 m	
2002	World Cup	Madrid, Spain	6th	Triple jump	13.79 m	
2003	World Championships	Paris, France	14th	Triple jump	13.92 m	
2004	World Indoor Championships	Budapest, Hungary	–	Triple jump	NM	
2005	European Indoor Championships	Madrid, Spain	7th	Triple jump	14.07 m	

== See also ==
- List of European Athletics Championships medalists (women)
- List of European Athletics Indoor Championships medalists (women)
