= 2002 African Championships in Athletics – Women's triple jump =

2002 African sports event

The women's triple jump event at the 2002 African Championships in Athletics was held in Radès, Tunisia on August 6.

== Results ==
Rank	Name	Nationality	Result	Notes
1st place, gold medalist(s)	Françoise Mbango	Cameroon	14.95	AR
2nd place, silver medalist(s)	Kéné Ndoye	Senegal	14.28	
3rd place, bronze medalist(s)	Baya Rahouli	Algeria	13.78	
4	Béatrice Kamboulé	Burkina Faso	12.58	
5	Monia Jelassi	Tunisia	12.35	
6	Mariette Mien	Burkina Faso	12.30	
7	Sihem Jelidi	Tunisia	12.14w	
8	Nejoua Mathlouthi	Tunisia	12.01	
	Ngoma Bonjo	Republic of the Congo	DNS	
	Grace Efago	Nigeria	DNS	
