= Silvia Biondini =

Italian triple jumper

Personal information
- National team: Italy (5 caps from 2001 to 1978)
- Born: January 24, 1976 (age 50) Arezzo, Italy

Sport
- Sport: Athletics
- Event(s): Triple jump Long jump

Achievements and titles
- Personal bests: Long jump: 6.13 m (2000); Triple jump: 14.15 m (2001)

Silvia Biondini (born 24 January 1976) is a retired Italian triple and long jumper.

== Career ==
She finished thirteenth at the 1997 European U23 Championships, sixth at the 2001 Mediterranean Games and seventh at the 2005 Mediterranean Games. She also competed at the 2002 European Championships without reaching the final.

Biondini became Italian champion in 2000 and 2001, and Italian indoor champion in 2001 and 2002. Her personal best jump was 14.15 metres, achieved in July 2001 in Catania.

== See also ==
- Italian all-time lists - Triple jump
