= 1997 European Athletics U23 Championships – Women's long jump =

The women's long jump event at the 1997 European Athletics U23 Championships was held in Turku, Finland, on 11 July 1997.

== Medalists ==
Gold	Tatyana Kotova; Russia
Silver	Cristina Nicolau; Romania
Bronze	Sofia Schulte; Germany

== Results ==
=== Final ===
11 July

Rank	Name	Nationality	Attempts						Result	Notes
Rank	Name	Nationality	1	2	3	4	5	6	Result	Notes
1st place, gold medalist(s)	Tatyana Kotova	Russia	6.57 (w: -1.1 m/s)	6.48 (w: -3.3 m/s)	6.48 (w: -1.3 m/s)	6.40 (w: -0.5 m/s)	6.42 (w: -1.0 m/s)	x	6.57 (w: -1.1 m/s)	
2nd place, silver medalist(s)	Cristina Nicolau	Romania	6.43 (w: 0.6 m/s)	6.05 (w: -1.2 m/s)	x	6.23 (w: -0.7 m/s)	x	6.15 (w: 0.9 m/s)	6.43 (w: 0.6 m/s)	
3rd place, bronze medalist(s)	Sofia Schulte	Germany	6.14 (w: -2.0 m/s)	6.25 (w: -0.9 m/s)	6.15 (w: -0.8 m/s)	4.54 (w: -1.8 m/s)	6.23 (w: -0.8 m/s)	6.39 (w: -0.6 m/s)	6.39 (w: -0.6 m/s)	
4	Heli Koivula	Finland	6.28 (w: -1.4 m/s)	6.11 (w: -2.0 m/s)	x	6.19 (w: -0.8 m/s)	6.33 (w: -0.5 m/s)	6.25 (w: -0.7 m/s)	6.33 (w: -0.5 m/s)	
5	Stephanie Hort	Germany	x	6.15 (w: -1.9 m/s)	6.27 (w: -1.3 m/s)	5.94 (w: -2.4 m/s)	x	6.10 (w: -1.0 m/s)	6.27 (w: -1.3 m/s)	
6	Irina Melnikova	Russia	6.26 (w: -0.5 m/s)	6.13 (w: -0.3 m/s)	5.77 (w: -1.3 m/s)	6.12 (w: -1.5 m/s)	x	5.83 (w: -0.4 m/s)	6.26 (w: -0.5 m/s)	
7	Camilla Johansson	Sweden	6.24 (w: -1.1 m/s)	5.91 (w: -2.7 m/s)	6.15 (w: 0.2 m/s)	6.11 (w: -1.8 m/s)	6.00 (w: -1.2 m/s)	6.13 (w: -1.0 m/s)	6.24 (w: -1.1 m/s)	
8	Sarah Gautreau	France	6.02 (w: -1.0 m/s)	6.21 (w: -1.5 m/s)	6.09 (w: -1.2 m/s)	6.06 (w: -1.2 m/s)	5.98 (w: -1.7 m/s)	6.16 (w: -0.6 m/s)	6.21 (w: -1.5 m/s)	
9	Arianna Zivez	Italy	x	5.98 (w: -1.8 m/s)	6.14 (w: -1.3 m/s)				6.14 (w: -1.3 m/s)	
10	Yuliya Akulenko	Ukraine	6.12 (w: 0.9 m/s)	x	x				6.12 (w: 0.9 m/s)	
11	Anja Valant	Slovenia	6.06 (w: -2.1 m/s)	x	5.75 (w: -0.8 m/s)				6.06 (w: -2.1 m/s)	
12	Bożena Trzcińska	Poland	x	5.89 (w: -1.1 m/s)	5.83 (w: -1.6 m/s)				5.89 (w: -1.1 m/s)	
13	Laureta Derhemi	Albania	5.34 (w: -1.4 m/s)	5.41 (w: -2.3 m/s)	x				5.41 (w: -2.3 m/s)	
	Johanna Halkoaho	Finland	x	x	x				NM	

== Participation ==
According to an unofficial count, 14 athletes from 11 countries participated in the event.

- Albania (1)
- Finland (2)
- France (1)
- Germany (2)
- Italy (1)
- Poland (1)
- Romania (1)
- Russia (2)
- Slovenia (1)
- Sweden (1)
- Ukraine (1)
