= Tereza Marinova =

Bulgarian athlete (born 1977)

Personal information
- Full name: Tereza Moncheva Marinova
- Born: 5 September 1977 (age 48) Pleven, Bulgaria
- Height: 5 ft 7 in (1.70 m)

Sport
- Country: Bulgaria
- Sport: Long jump, Triple jump
- Coached by: Svetoslav Topuzov (?–1996); Khristo Markov (1997–2008)
Medal record
Event	1st	2nd	3rd
Olympic Games	1	0	0
World Championships	0	0	1
World Indoor Championships	1	0	0
European Championships	0	0	1
European Indoor Championships	1	0	0
World Junior Championships	1	0	0
Total	4	0	2
Olympic Games
Gold medal – first place	2000 Sydney	Triple jump
World Championships
Bronze medal – third place	2001 Edmonton	Triple jump
World Indoor Championships
Gold medal – first place	2001 Lisbon	Triple jump
European Championships
Bronze medal – third place	1998 Budapest	Triple jump
European Indoor Championships
Gold medal – first place	2002 Vienna	Triple jump
World Junior Championships
Gold medal – first place	1996 Sydney	Triple jump

Tereza Moncheva Marinova (Bulgarian: Тереза Мончева Маринова; born 5 September 1977 in Pleven) is a Bulgarian athlete who specialised in the triple jump. She was the gold medallist in that event at the 2000 Summer Olympics and a bronze medallist at the 2001 World Championships in Athletics and 1998 European Athletics Championships. She won triple jump titles at the 2001 IAAF World Indoor Championships and 2002 European Athletics Indoor Championships. She made her international debut in 1994 and retired in 2008.

Her personal best in the triple jump of 15.20 m (49 ft 10 1/4 in), set during her Olympic win, is the Bulgarian national record. Marinova's winning jump of 14.62 m (47 ft 11 1/2 in) at the 1996 World Junior Championships in Athletics remains the world under-20 record for the triple jump. She also has a best of 6.53 m (21 ft 5 in) in the long jump, set indoors in 2002.

At the Bulgarian Athletics Championships, she won three triple jump titles (1995, 1996, 2003) and one long jump title in 2000. She also won three triple jump titles at the Bulgarian Indoor Athletics Championships (1996, 1999, 2006), as well as the long jump title in 2000. Marinova won six Balkan championships indoors and outdoors.

== Career ==
In her earlier days she became both European Junior and World Junior champion, and she still holds the world junior record at triple jump. At the 2000 Summer Olympics she won the gold medal with a personal best jump of 15.20 metres.

In long jump her personal best is 6.46 m. She did not compete internationally after the 2004 World Indoor Championships until 2006. She finished sixth at the 2006 European Athletics Championships.

Her father Moncho was a prominent 800 metres runner who once set a Bulgarian record and still holds the Bulgarian one mile record, and her brother Tsvetomir was a talented 400 metres runner.

Tereza Marinova retired from athletics shortly before the start of the 2008 Summer Olympics. Nine months after that she started work as an athletics instructor. Marinova was one of the commentators for the Bulgarian National Television during the 2012 Summer Olympics. She is currently an instructor at the National Sports Academy.

== Personal life ==
Marinova gave birth to her first child, a girl named Darina, on 17 February 2011. Her second child, a boy called Kalin, was born on 23 December 2012.

== International competitions ==
Representing Bulgaria
Year	Competition	Venue	Position	Event	Notes
1994	World Junior Championships	Lisbon, Portugal	15th (q)	Triple jump	12.82 m (wind: +0.8 m/s)
1995	European Junior Championships	Nyíregyháza, Hungary	1st	Triple jump	13.90
1996	European Indoor Championships	Stockholm, Sweden	16th (q)	Triple jump	13.40 m
1996	Balkan Championships	Niš, Yugoslavia	1st	Triple jump	14.02 m
1996	World Junior Championships	Sydney, Australia	1st	Triple jump	14.62 m (wind: +1.0 m/s)
1997	World Indoor Championships	Paris, France	8th	Triple jump	14.00 m
1997	European Cup	Prague, Czech Republic	2nd	Triple jump	13.99 m
1997	World Championships	Athens, Greece	6th	Triple jump	14.34 m
1998	European Championships	Valencia, Spain	9th	Triple jump	13.81 m
1998	European Championships	Budapest, Hungary	3rd	Triple jump	14.50 m
1999	Balkan Indoor Championships	Piraeus, Greece	1st	Triple jump	14.70 m
1999	World Indoor Championships	Maebashi, Japan	4th	Triple jump	14.76 m
1999	European Cup	Athens, Greece	2nd	Triple jump	14.40 m w
2000	Balkan Championships	Kavala, Greece	1st	Long jump	6.46 m
2000	Balkan Championships	Kavala, Greece	1st	Triple jump	14.44 m
2000	Summer Olympics	Sydney, Australia	1st	Triple jump	15.20 m PB
2001	Balkan Indoor Championships	Piraeus, Greece	1st	Triple jump	14.54 m
2001	World Indoor Championships	Lisbon, Portugal	1st	Triple jump	14.91 m
2001	World Championships	Edmonton, Canada	3rd	Triple jump	14.58 m
2001	Goodwill Games	Brisbane, Australia	2nd	Triple jump	14.37 m
2002	European Indoor Championships	Vienna, Austria	1st	Triple jump	14.71 m
2003	Balkan Indoor Championships	Athens, Greece	3rd	Triple jump	14.40 m
2003	World Indoor Championships	Birmingham, United Kingdom	10th (q)	Triple jump	14.09 m
2004	Balkan Indoor Championships	Paiania, Greece	2nd	Triple jump	14.43 m
2004	World Indoor Championships	Budapest, Hungary	16th (q)	Triple jump	14.13 m
2006	Balkan Indoor Championships	Piraeus, Greece	1st	Triple jump	14.49 m
2006	World Indoor Championships	Moscow, Russia	6th	Triple jump	14.37 m
2006	European Cup First League B	Thessaloniki, Greece	6th	Long jump	6.14 m
2006	European Cup First League B	Thessaloniki, Greece	2nd	Triple jump	14.21 m
2006	European Championships	Gothenburg, Sweden	6th	Triple jump	14.20 m

== National titles ==
- Bulgarian Athletics Championships
  - Triple jump: 1995, 1996, 2003
  - Long jump: 2000
- Bulgarian Indoor Athletics Championships
  - Triple jump: 1996, 1999, 2006
  - Long jump: 2000

== Honours ==
- Bulgarian Sportsperson of the Year - 2000

== See also ==
- Bulgaria at the 2000 Summer Olympics
- List of 2000 Summer Olympics medal winners
- List of Olympic medalists in athletics (women)
- List of World Athletics Championships medalists (women)
- List of IAAF World Indoor Championships medalists (women)
- List of European Athletics Championships medalists (women)
- List of European Athletics Indoor Championships medalists (women)
- Triple jump at the Olympics
- List of Bulgarians
- List of Bulgarian sportspeople
