= Camilla Johansson (triple jumper) =

Swedish triple jumper (born 1976)

Camilla Johansson (born 3 November 1976 in Växjö) is a retired Swedish track and field athlete who specialised in the triple jump. She represented her country at the 2000 Summer Olympics failing to qualify for the final.

Early in her career she also competed in the long jump.

== Competition record ==
Year	Competition	Venue	Position	Event	Notes
Representing Sweden
1997	European U23 Championships	Turku, Finland	7th	Long jump	6.24 m (wind: -1.1 m/s)
1997	European U23 Championships	Turku, Finland	4th	4 × 100 m relay	45.17
1998	European Championships	Budapest, Hungary	13th (q)	Long jump	6.53 m
2000	European Indoor Championships	Ghent, Belgium	–	Long jump	NM
2000	European Indoor Championships	Ghent, Belgium	7th	Triple jump	14.12 m
2000	Olympic Games	Sydney, Australia	17th (q)	Triple jump	13.87 m
2001	World Championships	Edmonton, Canada	11th	Triple jump	13.84 m
2002	European Championships	Munich, Germany	20th (q)	Triple jump	13.45 m
2003	World Championships	Paris, France	21st (q)	Triple jump	13.87 m
2004	World Indoor Championships	Budapest, Hungary	23rd (q)	Triple jump	13.76 m
2006	European Championships	Gothenburg, Sweden	10th	Triple jump	13.74 m

== Personal bests ==
Outdoor

- Long jump – 6.75 (0.0 m/s) (Växjö 1999)
- Triple jump – 14.15 (+0.5 m/s) (Halmstad 2003)

Indoor

- 60 metres – 7.69 (Malmö 2003)
- Long jump – 6.49 (Malmö 1999)
- Triple jump – 14.12 (Ghent 2000) NR
