= Anja Valant =

Slovenian athletics competitor (born 1977)

Personal information
- Born: 8 September 1977 (age 49) Celje, Yugoslavia

Sport
- Sport: Track and field
Medal record
Representing Slovenia
European U23 Championships
| Silver medal – second place | 1997 Turku | Triple jump |

Anja Valant (born 8 September 1977) is a retired Slovenian athlete who competed in the triple jump and long jump. Valant competed in the triple jump at the 2000 Olympic Games where she finished ninth.

Her personal best jump for the triple jump is 14.69 metres, achieved on 4 June 2000 in Kalamata and her personal best in the long jump is 6.54 metres, achieved on 18 May 1997 in Dolenjske Toplice, Slovenia. Her leap of 14.69m was the Slovenian national record until Marija Šestak jumped 14.92 metres on 3 June 2007 in Ljubljana.

Valant retired from competition after the 2012 season.

== Achievements ==
| Year | Competition | Venue | Position | Event | Notes |
Representing Slovenia
| 1994 | World Junior Championships | Lisbon, Portugal | 14th (q) | Triple jump | 12.82 m |
| 1995 | World Indoor Championships | Barcelona, Spain | 16th (q) | Triple jump | 13.20 m |
| 1995 | European Junior Championships | Nyíregyháza, Hungary | 5th | Triple jump | 13.54 m |
| 1996 | European Indoor Championships | Stockholm, Sweden | 11th | Triple jump | 13.35 m |
| 1996 | World Junior Championships | Sydney, Australia | 5th | Triple jump | 13.49 m |
| 1997 | World Indoor Championships | Paris, France | 17th (q) | Triple jump | 13.36 m |
| 1997 | Mediterranean Games | Bari, Italy | 7th | Long jump | 5.93 m |
| 1997 | Mediterranean Games | Bari, Italy | 5th | Triple jump | 13.31 m |
| 1997 | European U23 Championships | Turku, Finland | 11th | Long jump | 6.06 m |
| 1997 | European U23 Championships | Turku, Finland | 2nd | Triple jump | 13.98 m |
| 1997 | World Championships | Athens, Greece | 38th (q) | Long jump | 5.77 m |
| 1997 | World Championships | Athens, Greece | 30th (q) | Triple jump | 13.36 m |
| 1997 | Universiade | Catania, Italy | (q) | Long jump | 5.80 m |
| 1997 | Universiade | Catania, Italy | (q) | Triple jump | 13.53 m |
| 1998 | European Championships | Budapest, Hungary | 24th (q) | Long jump | 6.19 m |
| 1998 | European Championships | Budapest, Hungary | 17th (q) | Triple jump | 13.85 m |
| 1999 | Universiade | Palma de Mallorca, Spain | 7th | Triple jump | 13.92 m |
| 1999 | European U23 Championships | Gothenburg, Sweden | 4th | Triple jump | 14.29 m |
| 1999 | World Championships | Seville, Spain | 24th (q) | Triple jump | 13.06 m |
| 2000 | European Indoor Championships | Ghent, Belgium | 12th (q) | Triple jump | 13.40 m |
| 2000 | Olympic Games | Sydney, Australia | 9th | Triple jump | 13.59 m |
| 2001 | World Indoor Championships | Lisbon, Portugal | 7th | Triple jump | 13.84 m |
| 2001 | World Championships | Edmonton, Canada | 22nd (q) | Triple jump | 13.16 m |
| 2002 | European Indoor Championships | Vienna, Austria | 9th (q) | Triple jump | 13.64 m |
| 2002 | European Championships | Munich, Germany | 19th (q) | Triple jump | 13.53 m |
| 2003 | Military World Games | Catania, Italy | 3rd | Triple jump | 12.65 m |
