= 1997 European Athletics U23 Championships – Women's triple jump =

The women's triple jump event at the 1997 European Athletics U23 Championships was held in Turku, Finland, on 13 July 1997.

== Medalists ==
Gold	Cristina Nicolau; Romania
Silver	Anja Valant; Slovenia
Bronze	Heli Koivula; Finland

== Results ==
=== Final ===
13 July

Rank	Name	Nationality	Attempts						Result	Notes
Rank	Name	Nationality	1	2	3	4	5	6	Result	Notes
1st place, gold medalist(s)	Cristina Nicolau	Romania	14.22 (w: 1.1 m/s)	x	x	x	13.99 (w: 0.8 m/s)	x	14.22 (w: 1.1 m/s)	
2nd place, silver medalist(s)	Anja Valant	Slovenia	13.98 (w: 0.9 m/s)	x	13.49 (w: 0.6 m/s)	x	x	x	13.98 (w: 0.9 m/s)	
3rd place, bronze medalist(s)	Heli Koivula	Finland	13.49 (w: 1.4 m/s)	13.50 (w: 1.7 m/s)	12.88 (w: -0.4 m/s)	13.18 w (w: 2.6 m/s)	x	13.88 (w: 0.6 m/s)	13.88 (w: 0.6 m/s)	
4	Cosmina Boaja	Romania	13.30 (w: 1.4 m/s)	13.56 (w: -0.4 m/s)	x	x	13.72 (w: 1.0 m/s)	13.54 (w: 0.9 m/s)	13.72 (w: 1.0 m/s)	
5	Tatyana Drozdova	Russia	13.09 (w: 0.2 m/s)	13.48 (w: 0.7 m/s)	x	13.24 (w: 0.5 m/s)	13.67 (w: 0.5 m/s)	13.31 (w: 0.6 m/s)	13.67 (w: 0.5 m/s)	
6	Anna Rodovich	Ukraine	13.47 (w: 0.9 m/s)	13.31 (w: 0.9 m/s)	x	11.57 (w: 0.2 m/s)	x	13.31 (w: 1.1 m/s)	13.47 (w: 0.9 m/s)	
7	Olga Boiko	Ukraine	13.43 w (w: 2.9 m/s)	13.18 (w: 1.0 m/s)	13.34 (w: 0.8 m/s)	13.07 (w: 1.1 m/s)	12.76 (w: 0.3 m/s)	x	13.43 w (w: 2.9 m/s)	
8	Natalya Kostyuchenko	Belarus	13.25 (w: 1.6 m/s)	–	–	–	–	–	13.25 (w: 1.6 m/s)	
9	Irina Melnikova	Russia	12.65 (w: 0.5 m/s)	13.07 (w: 0.9 m/s)	13.21 (w: 0.2 m/s)				13.21 (w: 0.2 m/s)	
10	Aneta Sadach	Poland	x	12.66 (w: 1.5 m/s)	13.21 (w: 0.4 m/s)				13.21 (w: 0.4 m/s)	
11	Nathalie Jacques-Gustave	France	x	x	13.20 (w: 0.3 m/s)				13.20 (w: 0.3 m/s)	
12	Liliana Zagacka	Poland	13.12 (w: 0.3 m/s)	13.18 (w: 1.7 m/s)	12.03 (w: 1.2 m/s)				13.18 (w: 1.7 m/s)	
13	Silvia Biondini	Italy	13.00 (w: 1.4 m/s)	13.11 w (w: 2.8 m/s)	12.74 (w: 1.1 m/s)				13.11 w (w: 2.8 m/s)	

== Participation ==
According to an unofficial count, 13 athletes from 9 countries participated in the event.

- Belarus (1)
- Finland (1)
- France (1)
- Italy (1)
- Poland (2)
- Romania (2)
- Russia (2)
- Slovenia (1)
- Ukraine (2)
