= Françoise Mbango Etone =

Cameroonian-born track and field athlete

Medal record

Women's athletics

Representing Cameroon

Olympic Games
Gold medal – first place	2004 Athens	Triple jump
Gold medal – first place	2008 Beijing	Triple jump

World Championships
Silver medal – second place	2001 Edmonton	Triple jump
Silver medal – second place	2003 Paris	Triple jump

African Championships
Gold medal – first place	2002 Radès	Long jump
Gold medal – first place	2002 Radès	Triple jump
Gold medal – first place	2008 Addis Ababa	Triple jump
Silver medal – second place	1998 Dakar	Triple jump
Silver medal – second place	2000 Algiers	Triple jump
Bronze medal – third place	1996 Yaoundé	Triple jump
Bronze medal – third place	2000 Algiers	4×100 m

Françoise Mbango Etone (born 14 April 1976 in Yaoundé) is a Cameroonian-born female former track and field athlete. She has competed internationally for France since 2010. While competing for Cameroon, Etone was a 2-time Olympic gold medalist in the triple jump at the 2004 Olympic Games in Athens, Greece and 2008 Olympic Games in Beijing, China. She held the Olympic record for triple jump which she set with a distance of 15.39 m at the Beijing Olympics in 2008. The 15.39 m is the third longest women's triple jump in history under any conditions. Only 25 women have ever jumped 15 metres, Etone jumped beyond 15 metres on 7 of her last 11 attempts in the Olympic final alone.

Etone was also a talented long jumper who finished second at the African Championships in 1999. Etone was the first female athlete representing Cameroon to win medals at the Commonwealth Games, World Championships and Olympic Games. She has been a scholarship holder with the Olympic Solidarity program since November 2002.

During the 2005–06 academic year, she lived in New York City on a scholarship to attend St. John's University in Queens, New York. The scholarship was made possible through the collaboration of the American electricity company AES Sonel along with US Ambassador to Cameroon, Niels Marquardt. She selected St. John's University for study (along with her younger sister, Berthe) because of the school's support of cultural programs in Cameroon.

== Competition record ==
Year	Competition	Venue	Position	Event	Notes
Representing Cameroon
1996	African Championships	Yaoundé, Cameroon	3rd	Triple jump	12.51 m
1998	African Championships	Dakar, Senegal	2nd	Triple jump	13.80 m
1998	Commonwealth Games	Kuala Lumpur, Malaysia	10th	Long jump	6.11 m
1998	Commonwealth Games	Kuala Lumpur, Malaysia	2nd	Triple jump	13.95 m
1999	World Championships	Seville, Spain	13th (q)	Triple jump	14.12 m
1999	All-Africa Games	Johannesburg, South Africa	2nd	Long jump	6.55 m
1999	All-Africa Games	Johannesburg, South Africa	1st	Triple jump	14.70 m
2000	African Championships	Algiers, Algeria	3rd	4 × 100 m relay	46.97
2000	African Championships	Algiers, Algeria	1st	Triple jump	13.87 m
2000	Olympic Games	Sydney, Australia	24th (h)	4 × 100 m relay	45.82
2000	Olympic Games	Sydney, Australia	10th	Triple jump	13.53 m
2001	Jeux de la Francophonie	Ottawa, Canada	2nd	Long jump	6.37 m
2001	Jeux de la Francophonie	Ottawa, Canada	2nd	Triple jump	14.56 m
2001	World Championships	Edmonton, Canada	2nd	Triple jump	14.60 m
2002	Commonwealth Games	Manchester, United Kingdom	2nd	Triple jump	14.82 m
2002	African Championships	Radès, Tunisia	1st	Long jump	6.68 m (w)
2002	African Championships	Radès, Tunisia	1st	Triple jump	14.95 m
2003	World Indoor Championships	Birmingham, United Kingdom	2nd	Triple jump	14.88 m
2003	World Championships	Paris, France	2nd	Triple jump	15.05 m
2004	World Indoor Championships	Budapest, Hungary	6th	Triple jump	14.62 m
2004	Olympic Games	Athens, Greece	1st	Triple jump	15.30 m
2008	African Championships	Addis Ababa, Ethiopia	1st	Triple jump	14.76 m
2008	Olympic Games	Beijing, China	1st	Triple jump	15.39 m
Representing France
2012	European Championships	Helsinki, Finland	8th	Triple jump	14.19 m
