= Carlota Castrejana =

Spanish triple jumper (born 1973)

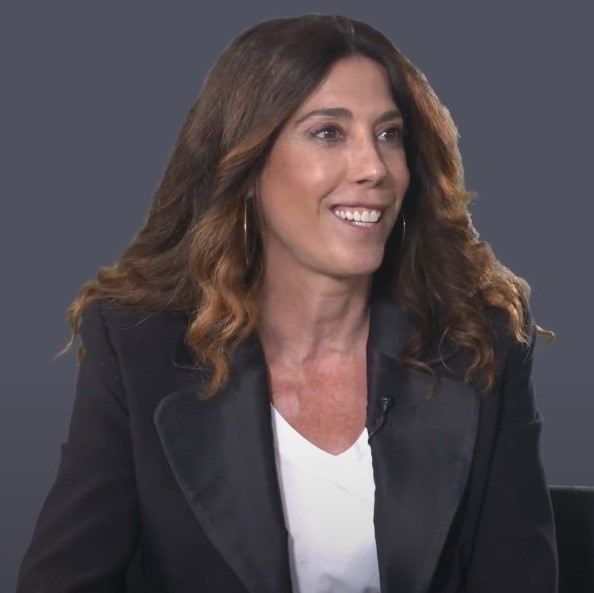

Personal information
- Born: 25 April 1973 (age 53) Logroño, Spain
- Height: 1.88 m (6 ft 2 in)
- Weight: 69 kg (152 lb)

Sport
- Sport: Track and field, basketball
- Event: Triple jump
- Club: Club Atlético Valencia Terra i Mar; La Rioja Atletismo
Medal record
Women's Athletics
Representing Spain
European Indoor Championships
Gold medal – first place	2007 Birmingham	Triple jump
Bronze medal – third place	2005 Madrid	Triple jump
Mediterranean Games
Silver medal – second place	2005 Almería	Triple jump
Bronze medal – third place	2001 Radès	Triple jump

María Carlota Castrejana Fernández (born 25 April 1973 in Logroño) is a female triple jumper from Spain. Her personal best jump is 14.60 metres, achieved at the 2005 Mediterranean Games in Almería. This is the current national record.

Castrejana has the uncommon achievement of having competed at major championships not only in her main sport triple jump, but also in the high jump at the 1995 World Indoor Championships and long jump at the 2002 European Indoor Championships. She also competed in basketball at the 1992 Summer Olympics.

== Competition record ==
Year	Competition	Venue	Position	Event	Notes
Representing Spain
1995	World Indoor Championships	Barcelona, Spain	23rd (q)	High jump	1.80 m
1997	Mediterranean Games	Bari, Italy	6th	High jump	1.84 m
1998	European Indoor Championships	Valencia, Spain	15th (q)	Triple jump	13.14 m
1998	Ibero-American Championships	Lisbon, Portugal	5th	Long jump	6.09 m
1998	Ibero-American Championships	Lisbon, Portugal	2nd	Triple jump	13.58 m
1999	Universiade	Palma de Mallorca, Spain	22nd (q)	Long jump	6.04 m
1999	Universiade	Palma de Mallorca, Spain	11th	Triple jump	13.37 m
2000	European Indoor Championships	Ghent, Belgium	9th (q)	Triple jump	13.59 m
2000	Ibero-American Championships	Rio de Janeiro, Brazil	1st	Triple jump	13.61 m
2000	Olympic Games	Sydney, Australia	18th (q)	Triple jump	13.76 m
2001	Universiade	Beijing, China	11th	Triple jump	13.38 m
2001	Mediterranean Games	Tunis, Tunisia	3rd	Triple jump	13.72 m (w)
2002	European Indoor Championships	Vienna, Austria	10th	Long jump	6.23 m
2002	European Indoor Championships	Vienna, Austria	8th	Triple jump	13.74 m
2002	European Championships	Munich, Germany	11th	Triple jump	13.82 m
2002	World Cup	Madrid, Spain	3rd	Triple jump	14.13 m
2003	World Indoor Championships	Birmingham, United Kingdom	6th	Triple jump	14.32 m (iNR)
2003	World Championships	Paris, France	22nd (q)	Triple jump	13.83 m
2004	World Indoor Championships	Budapest, Hungary	17th (q)	Triple jump	14.11 m
2004	Ibero-American Championships	Huelva, Spain	2nd	Triple jump	14.35 m
2004	Olympic Games	Athens, Greece	18th (q)	Triple jump	14.37 m
2005	European Indoor Championships	Madrid, Spain	3rd	Triple jump	14.45 m (NRi)
2005	Mediterranean Games	Almería, Spain	2nd	Triple jump	14.60 (NR)
2005	World Championships	Helsinki, Finland	11th	Triple jump	13.86 m
2006	World Indoor Championships	Moscow, Russia	9th (q)	Triple jump	14.14 m
2006	European Championships	Gothenburg, Sweden	11th	Triple jump	13.74 m
2007	European Indoor Championships	Birmingham, United Kingdom	1st	Triple jump	14.64 m (iNR)
2007	World Championships	Osaka, Japan	13th (q)	Triple jump	14.16 m
2007	World Athletics Final	Stuttgart, Germany	7th	Triple jump	13.91 m
2008	Olympic Games	Beijing, China	16th (q)	Triple jump	14.02 m
