= Baya Rahouli =

Algerian athlete (born 1979)

Personal information
- Nationality: Algerian
- Born: July 27, 1979 (age 47) Bab El Oued, Algeria
- Height: 1.76 m (5 ft 9 in)
- Weight: 58 kg (128 lb)

Sport
- Sport: Athletics
- Event: Triple jump
Medal record
Women's athletics
Representing Algeria
All-Africa Games
Gold medal – first place	2011 Maputo	Triple jump
Silver medal – second place	1999 Johannesburg	Triple jump
African Championships
Gold medal – first place	1998 Dakar	Triple jump
Gold medal – first place	2000 Algiers	Triple jump
Bronze medal – third place	1998 Dakar	Long jump
Bronze medal – third place	2002 Radès	Triple jump
Mediterranean Games
Gold medal – first place	2001 Radés	Triple jump
Gold medal – first place	2005 Almería	Triple jump
Bronze medal – third place	2013 Mersin	Triple jump

Baya Rahouli (Arabic: باية رحولي, born July 27, 1979) is an Algerian athlete who competes in the triple jump. She is a former African record holder in this event, and has two African championship titles, in 1998 and 2000, each time defeating Françoise Mbango Etone in second place and Kéné Ndoye in third place. In two editions of the Pan Arab Games she made a clean sweep, winning eight gold medals in total.

== Competition record ==
Year	Competition	Venue	Position	Event	Notes
Representing Algeria
1996	World Junior Championships	Sydney, Australia	10th	Triple jump	12.97 m (wind: +1.0 m/s)
1997	Mediterranean Games	Bari, Italy	5th	Long jump	6.19 m
1997	Mediterranean Games	Bari, Italy	6th	Triple jump	13.25 m
1997	Pan Arab Games	Beirut, Lebanon	1st	100 m	11.98
1997	Pan Arab Games	Beirut, Lebanon	1st	100 m hurdles	14.11
1997	Pan Arab Games	Beirut, Lebanon	1st	Long jump	6.09 m
1997	Pan Arab Games	Beirut, Lebanon	1st	Triple jump	13.51 m w
1998	World Junior Championships	Annecy, France	8th	100m hurdles	14.05 (wind: -1.0 m/s)
1998	World Junior Championships	Annecy, France	18th (q)	Long jump	6.12 m (wind: -1.1 m/s)
1998	World Junior Championships	Annecy, France	1st	Triple jump	14.04 m (wind: -0.3 m/s)
1998	African Championships	Dakar, Senegal	3rd	Long jump	6.36 m
1998	African Championships	Dakar, Senegal	1st	Triple jump	13.96 m
1999	Universiade	Palma de Mallorca, Spain	4th	Triple jump	14.22 m
1999	World Championships	Seville, Spain	16th (q)	Long jump	6.55 m (NR)
1999	World Championships	Seville, Spain	10th	Triple jump	14.00 m
1999	All-Africa Games	Johannesburg, South Africa	6th	Long jump	6.33 m
1999	All-Africa Games	Johannesburg, South Africa	2nd	Triple jump	14.64 m
2000	African Championships	Algiers, Algeria	1st	Triple jump	14.23 m
2000	Olympic Games	Sydney, Australia	5th	Triple jump	14.17 m
2001	Mediterranean Games	Radès, Tunisia	5th	Long jump	5.98 m
2001	Mediterranean Games	Radès, Tunisia	1st	Triple jump	14.30 m (w)
2002	African Championships	Radès, Tunisia	3rd	Triple jump	13.78 m
2003	World Indoor Championships	Birmingham, United Kingdom	7th	Triple jump	14.31 m (NR)
2003	World Championships	Paris, France	11th	Triple jump	14.26 m
2004	World Indoor Championships	Budapest, Hungary	10th	Triple jump	14.19 m
2004	Olympic Games	Athens, Greece	6th	Triple jump	14.86 m
2004	Pan Arab Games	Algiers, Algeria	1st	100 m	11.84
2004	Pan Arab Games	Algiers, Algeria	1st	100 m hurdles	13.49
2004	Pan Arab Games	Algiers, Algeria	1st	Long jump	6.19 m
2004	Pan Arab Games	Algiers, Algeria	1st	Triple jump	14.49 m
2005	Mediterranean Games	Almería, Spain	1st	Triple jump	14.98 m
2005	World Championships	Helsinki, Finland	7th	Triple jump	14.50 m
2006	African Championships	Bambous, Mauritius	5th	Triple jump	13.47 m
2008	Olympic Games	Beijing, China	22nd (q)	Triple jump	13.87 m
2010	African Championships	Nairobi, Kenya	4th	Triple jump	13.64 m
2011	World Championships	Daegu, South Korea	8th	Triple jump	14.12 m
2011	All-Africa Games	Maputo, Mozambique	1st	Triple jump	14.08 m
2011	Pan Arab Games	Doha, Qatar	1st	Triple jump	14.01 m
2012	World Indoor Championships	Istanbul, Turkey	14th (q)	Triple jump	13.83 m
2012	African Championships	Porto-Novo, Benin	4th	Triple jump	13.50 m
2013	Mediterranean Games	Mersin, Turkey	3rd	Triple jump	14.04 m
2013	World Championships	Moscow, Russia	17th (q)	Triple jump	13.41 m

== Personal bests ==
Outdoor

- 100 metres – 11.51 s (1999) NR
- 100 metres hurdles – 13.50 s (1998)
- Long jump – 6.70 m (1999) NR
- Triple jump – 14.98 m (2005) NR

Indoor

- 60 metres – 7.45 (1999)
- Triple Jump – 14.31 (2003, 2004) NR
