= Olena Hovorova =

Ukrainian triple jumper (born 1973)

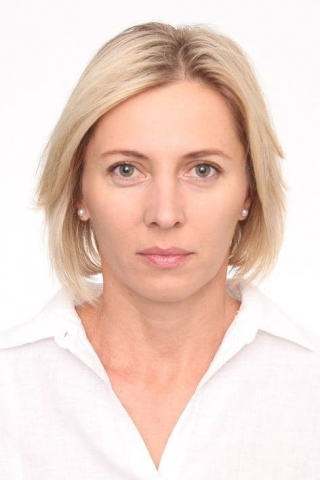

Personal information
- Born: 18 September 1973 (age 53) Izmail, Soviet Union

Sport
- Sport: Track and field
Medal record
Representing Ukraine
Olympic Games
Bronze medal – third place	2000 Sydney	Triple jump
World Championships
Bronze medal – third place	1997 Athens	Triple jump
Summer Universiade
Gold medal – first place	1997 Sicily	Triple jump
Gold medal – first place	1999 Mallorca	Triple jump
Goodwill Games
Bronze medal – third place	2001 Brisbane	Triple jump
European Cup
Silver medal – second place	1996 Madrid	Triple jump
Silver medal – second place	2000 Gateshead	Triple jump
Bronze medal – third place	1998 Saint Petersburg	Triple jump
Bronze medal – third place	2004 Bydgoszcz	Triple jump
Representing the Unified Team
World Junior Championships
Bronze medal – third place	1992 Seoul	Triple jump

Olena Ivanivna Hovorova (Ukrainian: Олена Іванівна Говорова; born 18 September 1973), also known as Yelena Govorova, is a former Ukrainian track and field athlete who specialised in triple jump competitions. She won the triple jump bronze medal at the 2000 Summer Olympics with her personal best jump of 14.96 metres. She represented Ukraine at the Olympics in the 1996, 2000, and 2004 triple jump competitions – the first three Olympic competitions for the discipline. She also competed at five consecutive World Championships in Athletics from 1995 to 2003.

She won the triple jump gold medal at the Summer Universiade in 1997 and 1999 – the first time an athlete had retained the title – and also won the bronze medal at the 1997 World Championships in Athletics. Although she often made the top-ten at competitions, she rarely reached the podium at major championships. A silver and a bronze from the European Cup in Athletics and a bronze from the 2001 Goodwill Games are the other significant medals she garnered in her career.

Hovorova is a candidate for the Kiev City Council of the party Servant of the People in the 2020 Kiev local election set for 25 October 2020. In the 2006 Ukrainian parliamentary election she was a candidate of Patriotic Party of Ukraine, but the party did not win any seats.

== Career ==
=== Early career ===
Hovorova began competing in 1991 and took her first junior medal (a bronze) in the triple jump competition at the 1992 World Junior Championships in Athletics. She began making her mark in the senior ranks a few years later with appearances in the finals of the 1995 IAAF World Indoor Championships and 1995 World Championships in Athletics.

She attended her first Olympic Games the year after, performing at the 1996 Atlanta Olympics, and she finished ninth in the triple jump final with a jump of 14.09 m. She remained overshadowed by compatriot Inessa Kravets, who won the gold medal. She was sixth at the 1996 European Athletics Indoor Championships, but Hovorova did manage to win the silver medal in the 1996 European Cup in Athletics that year.

=== First world medal ===
The 1997 season represented a breakthrough for her: starting with an indoor personal best of 14.13 m for seventh place at the 1997 IAAF World Indoor Championships and going on to win her first major medal later that year at the 1997 World Championships in Athletics. A new personal best jump of 14.67 m was enough to secure the bronze medal in the absence of Kravets. She won the triple jump gold at the 1997 Summer Universiade, and closed the year with a fourth-place finish at the 1997 IAAF Grand Prix Final.

After an uneventful 1998, in which she finished sixth at the 1998 European Athletics Championships, she retained her Universiade title at the 1999 Summer Universiade – the first athlete ever to do so. She did not demonstrate similar form at the major competitions that year, however, finishing tenth and seventh respectively at the 1999 IAAF World Indoor Championships and 1999 World Championships in Athletics.

=== Olympic bronze ===
Following a strong showing with an indoor personal best of 14.55 m for fourth at the 2000 European Athletics Indoor Championships, she took advantage of Inessa Kravets' suspension for steroids use to assert herself as the top Ukrainian by jumping a personal best of 14.96 m for the bronze medal at the 2000 Summers Olympics triple jump contest. The following year she won another bronze for a jump of 14.25 m at the 2001 Goodwill Games. She failed to maintain this form and registered sub-14-metre jumps at both the 2001 World Championships in Athletics and the 2002 European Athletics Championships, clearly out of medal contention at both competitions.

She regained her form for the following year, recording a jump of 14.81 m at a minor meeting in France and going on to take seventh at the 2003 World Championships in Athletics (14.38 m) and sixth at the inaugural IAAF World Athletics Final (14.46 m). She jumped a decent 14.59 m at the 2004 IAAF World Indoor Championships, but this was only enough for eighth place in the final as Tatyana Lebedeva's world record leap of 15.36 m signified an improvement in the standard of the women's event. Hovorova upped her game at the 2004 European Cup in Athletics and won the bronze with a season's best jump of 14.78 m. This was to be her premature peak to the season, however, as a mark of 14.35 m brought her only tenth place at the 2004 Summer Olympics in Athens and her final performance of the year yielded only eighth place at the 2004 IAAF World Athletics Final.

== Achievements ==
Year	Competition	Venue	Position	Event	Notes
Representing the Commonwealth of Independent States
1992	World Junior Championships	Seoul, South Korea	3rd	Triple jump	13.29 m (wind: 0.0 m/s)
Representing Ukraine
1995	World Championships	Gothenburg, Sweden	10th	Triple jump	14.07 m
1996	Summer Olympics	Atlanta, United States	9th	Triple jump	14.09 m
1997	World Championships	Athens, Greece	3rd	Triple jump	14.67 m
1997	Universiade	Sicily, Italy	1st	Triple jump	14.23 m
1999	Universiade	Palma de Mallorca, Spain	1st	Triple jump	14.99 m PB
2000	Summer Olympics	Sydney, Australia	3rd	Triple jump	14.96 m
