= Cristina Nicolau =

Romanian triple jumper

Personal information
- Born: 9 August 1977 Bucharest, Romania
- Died: 5 December 2017 (aged 40)

Sport
- Sport: Track and field
Medal record
Representing Romania
European Indoor Championships
Silver medal – second place	2000 Ghent	Triple jump
European U23 Championships
Gold medal – first place	1997 Turku	Triple jump
Gold medal – first place	1999 Gothenburg	Triple jump
Silver medal – second place	1997 Turku	Long jump
Summer Universiade
Bronze medal – third place	1997 Catania	Long jump

Cristina Nicolau (9 August 1977 – 5 December 2017) was a Romanian triple jumper.

Her personal best jump was 14.70 metres, achieved in August 1999 in Gothenburg. This mark places her jump third in the all-time Romanian woman triple jumper record list, only behind Rodica Mateescu and Adelina Gavrilă. Cristina Nicolau died on 5 December 2017, aged 40.

== Achievements ==
Year	Competition	Venue	Position	Event	Notes
Representing Romania
1992	World Junior Championships	Seoul, South Korea	10th	Long jump	5.98 m (wind: -0.9 m/s)
1994	World Junior Championships	Lisbon, Portugal	9th	Long jump	6.27 m (wind: +1.9 m/s)
1996	World Junior Championships	Sydney, Australia	2nd	Long jump	6.47 m (wind: +0.2 m/s)
1996	World Junior Championships	Sydney, Australia	2nd	Triple jump	13.64 m (wind: +0.4 m/s)
1997	Universiade	Catania, Italy	3rd	Long jump	6.40 m
1997	European U23 Championships	Turku, Finland	2nd	Long jump	6.43 m (wind: 0.6 m/s)
1997	European U23 Championships	Turku, Finland	1st	Triple jump	14.22 m (wind: 1.1 m/s)
1999	European U23 Championships	Gothenburg, Sweden	4th	Long jump	6.50 m (wind: 0.8 m/s)
1999	European U23 Championships	Gothenburg, Sweden	1st	Triple jump	14.70 m (wind: 1.3 m/s)
1999	World Championships	Seville, Spain	8th	Triple jump	14.38 m
2000	European Indoor Championships	Ghent, Belgium	2nd	Triple jump	14.63 m
2000	Olympic Games	Sydney, Australia	6th	Triple jump	14.17 m
2001	World Indoor Championships	Lisbon, Portugal	6th	Triple jump	14.05 m
2001	World Championships	Edmonton, Canada	6th	Triple jump	14.17 m
2002	European Indoor Championships	Vienna, Austria	5th	Triple jump	14.11 m
2002	European Championships	Munich, Germany	5th	Triple jump	14.39 m
2003	Military World Games	Catania, Italy	3rd	Long jump	5.93 m
2003	Military World Games	Catania, Italy	1st	Triple jump	13.45 m
