= Ashia Hansen =

British triple jumper

Ashia Hansen MBE
Personal information
- Nationality: British
- Born: 5 December 1971 (age 54) Evansville, Indiana, US
- Height: 170 cm (5 ft 7 in)
- Weight: 63 kg (139 lb)

Sport
- Sport: Track and field
- Event: triple jump
- Club: Birchfield Harriers; Essex Ladies AC
Medal record
Representing Great Britain
Women's athletics
World Indoor Championships
Gold medal – first place	1999 Maebashi	Triple jump
Gold medal – first place	2003 Birmingham	Triple jump
Silver medal – second place	1997 Paris	Triple jump
European Championships
Gold medal – first place	2002 Munich	Triple jump
European Indoor Championships
Gold medal – first place	1998 Valencia	Triple jump
Silver medal – second place	2002 Vienna	Triple jump
Representing England
Commonwealth Games
Gold medal – first place	1998 Kuala Lumpur	Triple jump
Gold medal – first place	2002 Manchester	Triple jump

Ashia Kate Nana Korantima Hansen (born 5 December 1971) is a retired British triple jumper. Fourth in the 1996 Olympic final, she broke the world indoor record when winning the 1998 European Indoor title, and went on to win gold medals at the World Indoor Championships in 1999 and 2003, at the Commonwealth Games in 1998 and 2002, and at the 2002 European Championships. Her British records of 15.15 metres (1997 outdoors) and 15.16 metres (1998 indoors), still stand. Injury forced her into retirement.

== Early life ==
Although born in the United States, Hansen was adopted when she was 3 months old by a Ghanaian father who worked for the United Nations and his English wife. They moved to Ghana before settling down in London when she was eight. She was often the only black child at her East London school and later spoke of the racist sentiment and teasing she experienced. As a fellow school mate in her 6th form years at Goodmayes sixth form centre, an ethnically very diverse school, it was clear she was well liked and there was none of this overt racism as previously described. She discovered a talent for running and was introduced to athletics by a teacher. Although she competed in her first international at age 17, she remained ambivalent about turning professional and only gave up her day job seven years later to fully commit herself. She did also win the 6th form district schools cross country title (over 2.5 miles) held at Hainault Forest (now Country Park) in 1989.

== Athletics career ==
Hansen trained at Ilford AC then Birchfield Harriers Athletics Club in Birmingham, along with other successful British athletes such as Denise Lewis, Kelly Sotherton, Mark Lewis-Francis and Katharine Merry. She was trained by Commonwealth Games medallist Aston Moore.

At the 1998 European Indoor Championships in Valencia, Spain, Hansen won the gold medal with a world record jump of 15.16m. This record lasted for 6 years. She is also the British record holder for the outdoor event with a jump of 15.15m in 1997.

Hansen won her first major outdoor gold at the 1998 Commonwealth Games in Kuala Lumpur, Malaysia with a jump of 14.32m.

At the 1999 World Indoor Championships in Maebashi, Japan, Hansen won Gold with a world leading jump of 15.02m.

At the 2002 Commonwealth Games in Manchester, England Hansen retained her Commonwealth gold with a Games Record jump of 14.86m.

In 2002 Hansen won gold at the European Championships in Munich, Germany with a jump of 15.00m.

Hansen won her second World Indoor title at the 2003 Championships in Birmingham, UK with a jump of 15.01m.

Hansen suffered a serious knee injury during the 2004 European Cup, requiring extensive surgery. She returned to triple jumping and competed at the British Championships, where she immediately climbed back to the top of the British rankings; however, she decided not to be part of the team for the European Athletics Championships that summer. She was hoping to make the 2008 Summer Olympics in Beijing but was unable to regain fitness in time and announced her retirement in July 2008.

Domestically, Hansen was the British triple jump champion four times, winning the British AAA Championships title in 1996, 1997, 2001 and 2002.

== Competition record ==
Year	Competition	Venue	Position	Notes
Representing Great Britain or England
1994	European Indoor Championships	Paris, France	17th (q)	13.30 m
1994	European Championships	Helsinki, Finland	15th (q)	13.45 m
1995	World Championships	Gothenburg, Sweden	21st (q)	13.61 m
1996	European Indoor Championships	Stockholm, Sweden	2nd (q)	14.32 m
1996	Olympic Games	Atlanta, United States	4th	14.49 m
1997	World Indoor Championships	Paris, France	2nd	14.70 m (iNR)
1997	World Championships	Athens, Greece	5th	14.49 m
1998	European Indoor Championships	Valencia, Spain	1st	15.16 m (iWR)
1998	Commonwealth Games	Kuala Lumpur, Malaysia	1st	14.32 m
1999	World Indoor Championships	Maebashi, Japan	1st	15.02 m
2000	Olympic Games	Sydney, Australia	11th	13.44 m
2001	World Championships	Edmonton, Canada	7th	14.10 m
2002	European Indoor Championships	Vienna, Austria	2nd	14.71 m
2002	Commonwealth Games	Manchester, United Kingdom	1st	14.86 m
2002	European Championships	Munich, Germany	1st	15.00 m (w)
2003	World Indoor Championships	Birmingham, United Kingdom	1st	15.01 m

== Personal life ==
Hansen was appointed a Member of the Order of the British Empire (MBE) in the 2003 New Year Honours for services to athletics.

Hansen has two younger sisters; one of them is her parents' biological child and the other an adopted cousin. She has two children herself.
