= Wiktoriýa Brigadnaýa =

Turkmenistan athlete

Personal information
- Nationality: Turkmenistan
- Born: 4 August 1980 (age 45)

Sport
- Sport: Athletics
- Event: Triple jump

Wiktoriýa Brigadnaýa (born 4 August 1980) is a Turkmenistan athlete. She competed in the women's triple jump at the 2000 Summer Olympics.
