= Heli Koivula-Kruger =

Finnish track and field athlete

Medal record

Women's athletics

Representing Finland

European Championships
Silver medal – second place	2002 Munich	Triple jump

Heli Maarit Kruger (née Koivula, formerly Koivula-Kruger; born 27 June 1975) is a Finnish former track and field athlete. She was born in Kauhajoki and represented Kauhajoen Karhu throughout her career. She lives in Vaasa. Her main athletic events were the triple jump and the long jump. She won the silver medal at the 2002 European Championships in Athletics in triple jump, with a wind assisted result of 14.83 metres. She held the Finnish record in triple jump, clearing 14.39 metres, from 2003 to 2021. She was married to discus thrower Frantz Kruger.

== Achievements ==
Year	Competition	Venue	Position	Event	Notes
Representing Finland
1992	World Junior Championships	Seoul, South Korea	4th	Long jump	6.14 m (wind: -0.5 m/s)
1994	World Junior Championships	Lisbon, Portugal	2nd	Long jump	6.64 m w (wind: +3.2 m/s)
1997	European U23 Championships	Turku, Finland	4th	Long jump	6.33 m (wind: -0.5 m/s)
1997	European U23 Championships	Turku, Finland	3rd	Triple jump	13.88 m (wind: +0.6 m/s)
2002	European Championships	Munich, Germany	2nd	Triple jump	14.83 w
