= Magdelín Martínez =

Cuban athletics competitor (born 1976)

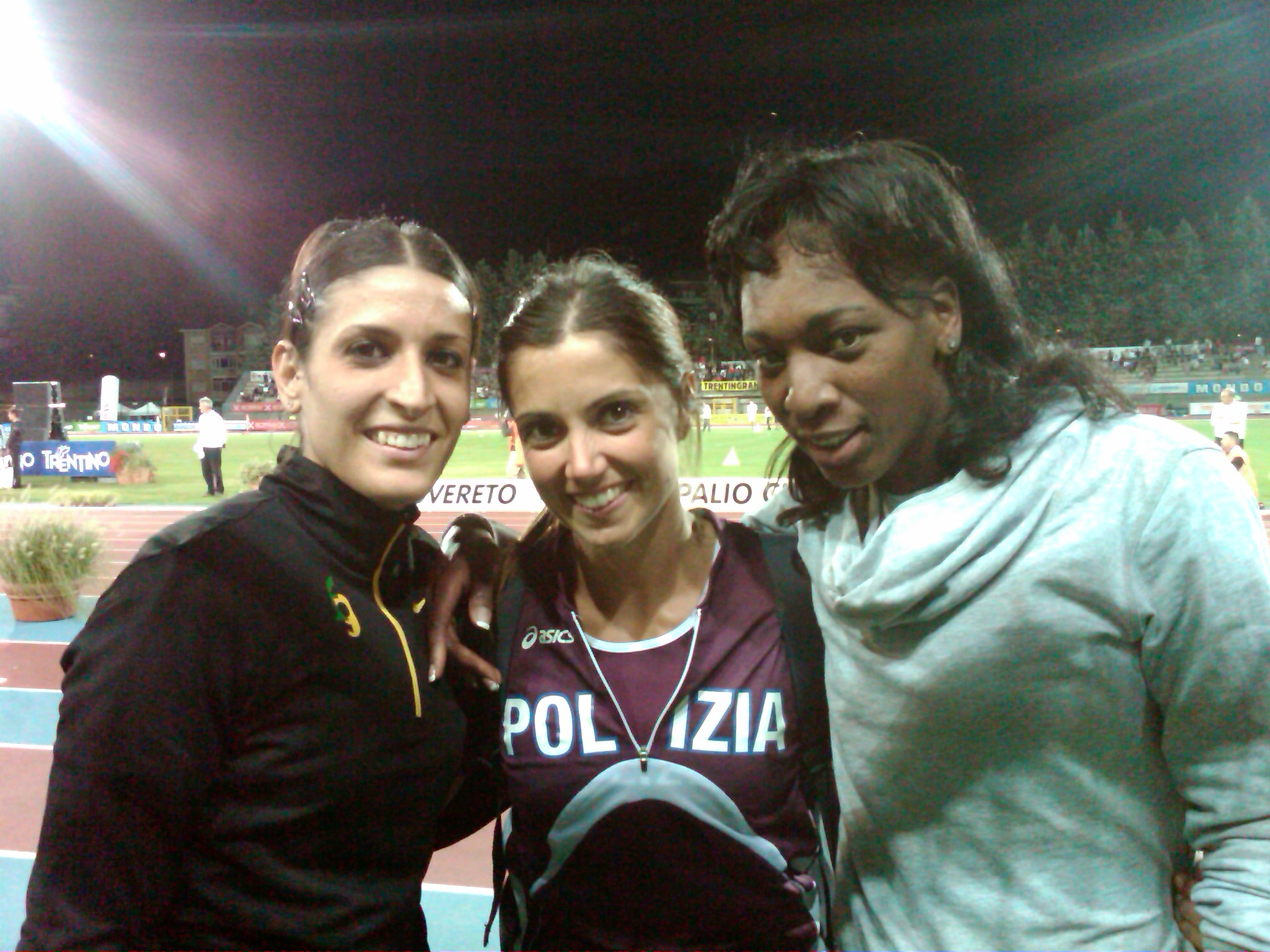
- Magdelín Martínez (right)

Personal information
- Full name: Magdelín Martínez Castillo
- Nationality: Italian
- Born: September 10, 1976 (age 49) Camagüey, Cuba
- Height: 1.78 m (5 ft 10 in)
- Weight: 63 kg (139 lb)

Sport
- Country: Italy
- Sport: Athletics
- Events: Long jump Triple jump
- Club: Assindustria Sport Padova

Achievements and titles
- Personal bests: Long jump: 6.67 m (2004); Long jump indoor: 6.25 m (2005); Triple jump: 15.03 m (2004); Triple jump indoor: 14.81 m (2004)
Medal record
World Championships
Representing Italy
Bronze medal – third place	2003 Paris	Triple jump
Pan American Games
Representing Cuba
Bronze medal – third place	1999 Winnipeg	Triple jump

Magdelín Martínez Castillo (Spanish pronunciation: [maɣðeˈlim maɾˈtines]; born February 10, 1976, in Camagüey, Cuba) is a Cuban-born female triple jumper, competing internationally for Italy.

== Biography ==
She originally represented Cuba. She won the bronze medal at the 1999 Pan American Games. She jumped 14.27 metres in 1998 and 14.40 metres in 2000.

She met future husband, Giuseppe Piccotti, while he was holidaying in the Caribbean. When he fell ill, she was quick to supply him with medicine, and it all went from there. After moving to Italy she wanted to take up jumping again but even though she was jumping personal bests she felt a little closed off from her colleagues, and accepted with good spirits that she would have to become an Italian. She naturalised in July 2001 and competed for Italy at the 2001 World Championships in Edmonton. She finished fourth, having set a personal best of 14.59 metres in the qualification.

The next year she finished sixth at the 2002 European Championships. In 2003, she finished fifth at the 2003 World Indoor Championships before winning the bronze medal at the 2003 World Championships. At the end of the season she finished fifth at the first World Athletics Final. In 2004, she finished fifth at the World Indoor Championships, seventh at the Olympic Games and fifth at the World Athletics Final. She also jumped two career bests: 15.03 in the triple jump in the Rome Golden Gala, and 6.67 in long jump in Rieti. In 2005, she won the silver medal at the European Indoor Championships, finished eighth at the World Championships and seventh at the World Athletics Final.

2006 was a mediocre year. Her season's best was 14.25 metres, down from 15.03 in 2004 and 14.69 in 2005. She competed at the 2006 European Championships, but did not reach the final. However, she made a small comeback in 2007 to finish seventh at the 2007 World Championships. Her season's best jump was 14.71 metres. The next year she competed at the 2008 Olympic Games without reaching the final.

== See also ==
- Italian all-time top lists - Long jump
