= Adelina Gavrilă =

Romanian triple jumper

Personal information
- Born: 26 November 1978 (age 47) Brăila, Romania

Sport
- Sport: Track and field
Medal record
Representing Romania
Summer Universiade
Bronze medal – third place	1999 Palma de Mallorca	Triple jump
European U23 Championships
Bronze medal – third place	1999 Gothenburg	Triple jump
World Junior Championships
Bronze medal – third place	1996 Sydney	Triple jump

Adelina Gavrilă (born 26 November 1978) is a Romanian triple jumper.

She was a bronze medalist at the 1996 World Junior Championships. In 1998 she broke the 14-metre barrier for the first time, with 14.53 metres. In 1999 she improved to 14.71 metres.

She won the bronze medal at the 1999 Universiade, finished twelfth at the 1999 World Indoor Championships, eleventh at the 1999 World Championships, eighth at the 2001 World Indoor Championships and at the 2001 Universiade. In 2002, she had a mediocre season in 2002, with 13.51 metres as her season's best.

The next year she improved to new lengths, jumping 14.75 metres in September. She finished twelfth at the 2003 World Indoor Championships, ninth at the 2003 World Championships, seventh at the 2003 World Athletics Final, seventh at the 2004 World Indoor Championships and fifteenth at the 2004 Olympic Games. In 2004, 14.71 metres was again her season's best.

In 2005, she dropped to 14.23 metres, achieved in Hengelo in May. She finished fifth at the 2005 European Indoor Championships, seventh at the 2006 European Championships and fifth at the 2007 European Indoor Athletics Championships. She then competed at the 2007 World Championships, the 2008 World Indoor Championships and the 2008 Olympic Games without reaching the final.

Despite her failure to reach international finals in 2008, she had set a personal best on the indoor track with 14.78 metres, achieved in February 2008 in Bucharest. Her personal best outdoor jump of 14.75 metres, achieved in September 2003 in Rieti, places her second in the all-time Romanian performers list, only behind Rodica Mateescu.
