= 2002 World Junior Championships in Athletics – Women's triple jump =

The women's triple jump event at the 2002 World Junior Championships in Athletics was held in Kingston, Jamaica, at National Stadium on 16 and 17 July.

== Medalists ==
Gold	Mabel Gay; Cuba
Silver	Arianna Martínez; Cuba
Bronze	Keila Costa; Brazil

== Results ==
=== Final ===
17 July

Rank	Name	Nationality	Attempts						Result	Notes
Rank	Name	Nationality	1	2	3	4	5	6	Result	Notes
1st place, gold medalist(s)	Mabel Gay	Cuba	13.51 (w: -1.1 m/s)	x	13.73 (w: -0.7 m/s)	13.23 (w: -0.4 m/s)	13.76 (w: -0.1 m/s)	14.09 (w: +1.3 m/s)	14.09 (w: +1.3 m/s)	
2nd place, silver medalist(s)	Arianna Martínez	Cuba	13.46 (w: -1.2 m/s)	x	13.49 (w: -0.4 m/s)	13.46 (w: -0.9 m/s)	13.74 (w: +0.4 m/s)	13.64 (w: +1.1 m/s)	13.74 (w: +0.4 m/s)	
3rd place, bronze medalist(s)	Keila Costa	Brazil	13.30 (w: -1.3 m/s)	13.31 (w: -0.5 m/s)	13.47 (w: +0.1 m/s)	13.56 (w: -0.6 m/s)	13.68 (w: -0.1 m/s)	13.70 (w: +0.5 m/s)	13.70 (w: +0.5 m/s)	
4	Yu Shaohua	China	13.14 (w: -0.2 m/s)	x	13.31 (w: +0.3 m/s)	12.86 (w: -0.6 m/s)	13.13 (w: -0.2 m/s)	x	13.31 (w: +0.3 m/s)	
5	Olga Saladukha	Ukraine	13.12 (w: -0.9 m/s)	13.06 (w: -0.1 m/s)	13.02 (w: -0.6 m/s)	13.17 (w: +0.4 m/s)	13.13 (w: -0.2 m/s)	13.16 (w: +0.6 m/s)	13.17 (w: +0.4 m/s)	
6	Tatyana Bocharova	Kazakhstan	12.80 (w: -1.1 m/s)	12.83 (w: -0.6 m/s)	x	x	12.97 (w: +0.3 m/s)	12.57 (w: +0.1 m/s)	12.97 (w: +0.3 m/s)	
7	Katja Demut	Germany	12.48 (w: -0.6 m/s)	12.75 (w: -0.5 m/s)	x	12.84 (w: +0.6 m/s)	12.07 (w: 0.0 m/s)	12.94 (w: +0.1 m/s)	12.94 (w: +0.1 m/s)	
8	Simona La Mantia	Italy	12.91 (w: -1.2 m/s)	x	x	x	12.86 (w: +0.2 m/s)	12.77 (w: +0.3 m/s)	12.91 (w: -1.2 m/s)	
9	Kamila Rywelska	Poland	12.32 (w: -0.5 m/s)	12.73 (w: -0.6 m/s)	12.21 (w: -0.2 m/s)				12.73 (w: -0.6 m/s)	
10	Athanasía Pérra	Greece	x	x	12.62 (w: -0.3 m/s)				12.62 (w: -0.3 m/s)	
11	Zita Óvári	Hungary	x	12.38 (w: -0.9 m/s)	12.06 (w: 0.0 m/s)				12.38 (w: -0.9 m/s)	
12	Anniina Lindholm	Finland	x	x	11.33 (w: -0.2 m/s)				11.33 (w: -0.2 m/s)	

=== Qualifications ===
16 Jul

==== Group A ====
Rank	Name	Nationality	Attempts			Result	Notes
Rank	Name	Nationality	1	2	3	Result	Notes
1	Keila Costa	Brazil	13.14 (w: 0.0 m/s)	13.49 (w: +0.8 m/s)	-	13.49 (w: +0.8 m/s)	Q
2	Arianna Martínez	Cuba	13.40 (w: +0.3 m/s)	-	-	13.40 (w: +0.3 m/s)	Q
3	Yu Shaohua	China	13.25 (w: +1.1 m/s)	-	-	13.25 (w: +1.1 m/s)	Q
4	Zita Óvári	Hungary	x	13.12 (w: +0.3 m/s)	x	13.12 (w: +0.3 m/s)	q
5	Tatyana Bocharova	Kazakhstan	12.81 (w: +0.5 m/s)	13.06 (w: +1.1 m/s)	13.09 (w: +0.3 m/s)	13.09 (w: +0.3 m/s)	q
6	Kamila Rywelska	Poland	13.02 (w: +1.3 m/s)	x	12.89 (w: +0.5 m/s)	13.02 (w: +1.3 m/s)	q
7	Sheena Gordon	United States	12.25 (w: +0.6 m/s)	12.81 (w: +0.4 m/s)	12.59 (w: +0.4 m/s)	12.81 (w: +0.4 m/s)	
8	Karoline Köhler	Germany	x	12.77 (w: +0.8 m/s)	12.58 (w: +1.6 m/s)	12.77 (w: +0.8 m/s)	
9	Caterine Ibargüen	Colombia	12.43 (w: +0.5 m/s)	12.69 (w: +0.6 m/s)	12.14 (w: +1.0 m/s)	12.69 (w: +0.6 m/s)	
10	Lianna Hovhannisyan	Armenia	12.01 (w: +0.9 m/s)	12.11 (w: +0.4 m/s)	12.17 (w: +1.1 m/s)	12.17 (w: +1.1 m/s)	

==== Group B ====
Rank	Name	Nationality	Attempts			Result	Notes
Rank	Name	Nationality	1	2	3	Result	Notes
1	Mabel Gay	Cuba	13.67 (w: +1.0 m/s)	-	-	13.67 (w: +1.0 m/s)	Q
2	Olga Saladukha	Ukraine	13.11 (w: +0.1 m/s)	13.27 (w: +0.7 m/s)	-	13.27 (w: +0.7 m/s)	Q
3	Katja Demut	Germany	x	13.03 (w: +1.2 m/s)	13.09 (w: +0.8 m/s)	13.09 (w: +0.8 m/s)	q
4	Anniina Lindholm	Finland	x	12.97 (w: +0.2 m/s)	x	12.97 (w: +0.2 m/s)	q
4	Simona La Mantia	Italy	12.97 (w: +0.4 m/s)	x	x	12.97 (w: +0.4 m/s)	q
6	Athanasía Pérra	Greece	12.71 (w: +0.5 m/s)	12.89 (w: +0.9 m/s)	x	12.89 (w: +0.9 m/s)	q
7	Nelly Tchayem	France	12.66 (w: +0.5 m/s)	12.41 (w: +0.8 m/s)	12.76 (w: +0.7 m/s)	12.76 (w: +0.7 m/s)	
8	Brooklyn Hann	United States	x	12.76 (w: +1.0 m/s)	11.96 (w: +0.4 m/s)	12.76 (w: +1.0 m/s)	
9	Kemba Johnson	Jamaica	11.45 (w: +0.3 m/s)	11.61 (w: +0.4 m/s)	11.40 (w: +0.6 m/s)	11.61 (w: +0.4 m/s)	
10	Sofiya Yushenko	Turkmenistan	x	x	11.51 (w: +1.1 m/s)	11.51 (w: +1.1 m/s)	
	Alina Popescu	Romania	x	x	x	NM	

== Participation ==
According to an unofficial count, 21 athletes from 18 countries participated in the event.

- Armenia (1)
- Brazil (1)
- China (1)
- Colombia (1)
- Cuba (2)
- Finland (1)
- France (1)
- Germany (2)
- Greece (1)
- Hungary (1)
- Italy (1)
- Jamaica (1)
- Kazakhstan (1)
- Poland (1)
- Romania (1)
- Turkmenistan (1)
- Ukraine (1)
- United States (2)
