= 2005 European Athletics U23 Championships – Women's triple jump =

The women's triple jump event at the 2005 European Athletics U23 Championships was held in Erfurt, Germany, at Steigerwaldstadion on 14 and 16 July.

== Medalists ==
Gold	Simona La Mantia; Italy
Silver	Svetlana Bolshakova; Russia
Bronze	Athanasia Perra; Greece

== Results ==
=== Final ===
16 July

Rank	Name	Nationality	Attempts						Result	Notes
Rank	Name	Nationality	1	2	3	4	5	6	Result	Notes
1st place, gold medalist(s)	Simona La Mantia	Italy	14.34 (w: -0.6 m/s)	13.64 (w: 0.6 m/s)	14.10 (w: 1.1 m/s)	14.00 (w: 1.3 m/s)	14.26 (w: 0.0 m/s)	14.43 (w: +1.1 m/s)	14.43 (w: -0.6 m/s)	
2nd place, silver medalist(s)	Svetlana Bolshakova	Russia	x	14.11 (w: 0.7 m/s)	13.80 (w: 0.7 m/s)	13.82 (w: 0.8 m/s)	x	x	14.11 (w: 0.7 m/s)	
3rd place, bronze medalist(s)	Athanasia Perra	Greece	x	x	13.70 (w: 0.0 m/s)	13.92 (w: 0.2 m/s)	13.94 (w: 0.3 m/s)	13.62 (w: 0.0 m/s)	13.94 (w: 0.3 m/s)	
4	Olha Saladuha	Ukraine	13.58 (w: 0.6 m/s)	13.89 (w: 1.0 m/s)	13.73 (w: 1.1 m/s)	13.64 (w: 0.1 m/s)	13.93 (w: 0.2 m/s)	13.89 (w: 0.2 m/s)	13.93 (w: 0.2 m/s)	
5	Anastasiya Taranova	Russia	13.75 (w: 0.4 m/s)	13.54 (w: 0.9 m/s)	13.72 (w: 0.3 m/s)	13.49 (w: 0.7 m/s)	13.77 (w: 0.0 m/s)	13.62 (w: 0.1 m/s)	13.77 (w: 0.0 m/s)	
6	Aleksandra Fila	Poland	13.67 (w: 0.0 m/s)	12.69 (w: 0.5 m/s)	x	13.73 (w: 0.8 m/s)	x	13.60 (w: 0.4 m/s)	13.73 (w: 0.8 m/s)	
7	Veera Baranova	Estonia	13.16 (w: 0.7 m/s)	13.28 (w: 1.3 m/s)	13.52 (w: 0.8 m/s)	13.51 (w: 0.4 m/s)	13.69 (w: 0.5 m/s)	13.17 (w: -0.1 m/s)	13.69 (w: 0.5 m/s)	
8	Teresa Nzola Meso Ba	France	13.29 (w: 0.7 m/s)	13.47 (w: 0.5 m/s)	13.32 (w: 1.3 m/s)	13.30 (w: 0.9 m/s)	13.22 (w: -0.1 m/s)	13.21 (w: -0.3 m/s)	13.47 (w: 0.5 m/s)	
9	Agata Kosuda	Poland	x	13.42 (w: 0.0 m/s)	13.20 (w: 0.0 m/s)				13.42 (w: 0.0 m/s)	
10	Darinka Yotova	Bulgaria	12.94 (w: 1.5 m/s)	13.25 (w: 0.6 m/s)	13.37 (w: 1.0 m/s)				13.37 (w: 1.0 m/s)	
11	Nelly Tchayem	France	x	x	13.12 (w: 0.5 m/s)				13.12 (w: 0.5 m/s)	
12	Katja Demut	Germany	x	12.94 (w: 0.4 m/s)	12.96 (w: -0.1 m/s)				12.96 (w: -0.1 m/s)	

=== Qualifications ===
14 July
Qualifying 13.50 or 12 best to the Final

==== Group A ====
Rank	Name	Nationality	Result	Notes
1	Anastasiya Taranova	Russia	13.77 (w: -1.1 m/s)	Q
2	Athanasia Perra	Greece	13.63 (w: -1.3 m/s)	Q
3	Teresa Nzola Meso Ba	France	13.54 (w: -1.1 m/s)	Q
4	Agata Kosuda	Poland	13.21 (w: -1.9 m/s)	q
5	Katja Demut	Germany	13.18 (w: -0.5 m/s)	q
6	Darinka Yotova	Bulgaria	13.14 (w: -0.6 m/s)	q
7	Zita Óvári	Hungary	12.74 (w: -0.8 m/s)	
8	Liubov Malla	Moldova	12.13 (w: -1.0 m/s)	

==== Group B ====
Rank	Name	Nationality	Result	Notes
1	Simona La Mantia	Italy	14.12 (w: -0.9 m/s)	Q
2	Svetlana Bolshakova	Russia	13.75 (w: -0.4 m/s)	Q
3	Olha Saladuha	Ukraine	13.54 (w: -0.3 m/s)	Q
4	Veera Baranova	Estonia	13.40 (w: -0.1 m/s)	q
5	Aleksandra Fila	Poland	13.37 (w: -0.3 m/s)	q
6	Nelly Tchayem	France	13.21 (w: -0.5 m/s)	q
7	Kamila Rywelska	Poland	12.91 (w: -1.0 m/s)	

== Participation ==
According to an unofficial count, 15 athletes from 11 countries participated in the event.

- Bulgaria (1)
- Estonia (1)
- France (2)
- Germany (1)
- Greece (1)
- Hungary (1)
- Italy (1)
- Moldova (1)
- Poland (3)
- Russia (2)
- Ukraine (1)
