= 2005 European Athletics Indoor Championships – Women's triple jump =

The Women's triple jump event at the 2005 European Athletics Indoor Championships was held on March 4–6.

== Medalists ==
Gold	Silver	Bronze
Viktoriya Gurova; Russia	Magdelín Martínez; Italy	Carlota Castrejana; Spain

== Results ==
=== Qualification ===
Qualifying perf. 14.30 (Q) or 8 best performers (q) advanced to the Final.

Rank	Group	Athlete	Nationality	#1	#2	#3	Result	Note
1	A	Viktoriya Gurova	Russia	13.72	14.56		14.56	Q, PB
2	A	Magdelín Martínez	Italy	14.25	14.39		14.39	Q
3	B	Carlota Castrejana	Spain	13.71	14.32		14.32	Q, SB
4	B	Adelina Gavrilă	Romania	X	13.91	14.27	14.27	q
5	B	Šárka Kašpárková	Czech Republic	13.94	14.06	14.17	14.17	q
6	A	Natallia Safronava	Belarus	14.17	X	X	14.17	q, =SB
7	B	Yelena Oleynikova	Russia	13.99	14.00	14.05	14.05	q
8	B	Simona La Mantia	Italy	13.92	13.96	13.78	13.96	q
9	A	Snežana Vukmirovic	Slovenia	X	13.38	13.93	13.93	PB
10	B	Hrisopiyi Devetzi	Greece	11.49	13.84	13.92	13.92	
11	A	Irini Dimitraki	Greece	13.84	13.85	13.81	13.85	
12	A	Athanasia Perra	Greece	X	13.50	13.72	13.72	
13	B	Dana Velďáková	Slovakia	13.69	13.56	13.60	13.69	
14	A	Mariana Solomon	Romania	X	X	13.55	13.55	
15	B	Oksana Rogova	Russia	X	13.24	13.42	13.42	
16	B	Theresa N'Zola	France	13.29	X	13.31	13.31	
17	A	Martina Darmovzalová	Czech Republic	X	13.31	12.98	13.31	
18	A	Julia Dubina	Georgia	13.17	X	13.22	13.22	

=== Final ===
Rank	Athlete	Nationality	#1	#2	#3	#4	#5	#6	Result	Note
1st place, gold medalist(s)	Viktoriya Gurova	Russia	14.37	14.35	14.74	X	X	X	14.74	WL
2nd place, silver medalist(s)	Magdelín Martínez	Italy	X	14.40	14.49	14.35	X	14.54	14.54	SB
3rd place, bronze medalist(s)	Carlota Castrejana	Spain	X	14.29	X	14.42	14.44	14.45	14.45	NR
4	Šárka Kašpárková	Czech Republic	14.06	14.34	14.25	X	14.09	13.91	14.34	SB
5	Adelina Gavrilă	Romania	14.15	14.33	14.13	X	14.27	13.92	14.33	
6	Natallia Safronava	Belarus	14.15	X	X	14.31	14.19	X	14.31	SB
7	Yelena Oleynikova	Russia	14.02	13.99	X	14.07	X	X	14.07	
8	Simona La Mantia	Italy	X	14.05	14.06	13.85	13.91	X	14.06	
