= 2011 European Athletics Indoor Championships – Women's triple jump =

The women's triple jump event at the 2011 European Athletics Indoor Championships was held at March 4, 2011 at 09:00 (qualification) and March 5, 14:45 (final) local time.

== Records ==
Standing records prior to the 2011 European Athletics Indoor Championships
World record	Tatyana Lebedeva (RUS)	15.36	Budapest, Hungary	6 March 2004
European record	Tatyana Lebedeva (RUS)	15.36	Budapest, Hungary	6 March 2004
Championship record	Ashia Hansen (GBR)	15.16	Valencia, Spain	28 February 1998
World Leading	Katja Demut (GER)	14.47	Düsseldorf, Germany	11 February 2011
European Leading	Katja Demut (GER)	14.47	Düsseldorf, Germany	11 February 2011

== Results ==
=== Qualification ===
Qualification: Qualification Performance 14.10 (Q) or at least 8 best performers advanced to the final. It was held at 09:00.

Rank	Athlete	Nationality	#1	#2	#3	Result	Note
1	Natalya Kutyakova	Russia	13.82	13.87	14.44	14.44	Q, PB
2	Simona La Mantia	Italy	14.00	14.38		14.38	Q, SB
3	Dana Veldáková	Slovakia	X	14.27		14.27	Q, SB
4	Snežana Rodic	Slovenia	14.25			14.25	Q, PB
5	Petia Dacheva	Bulgaria	13.65	13.10	14.20	14.20	Q, PB
6	Olesya Zabara	Russia	14.13			14.13	Q
7	Cristina Bujin	Romania	X	14.12		14.12	Q, SB
DQ	Athanasia Perra	Greece	~~13.90~~	~~14.01~~	~~13.85~~	~~14.01~~	q, Doping
8	Patricia Sarrapio	Spain	13.81	13.98	X	13.98	SB
9	Biljana Topić	Serbia	13.73	13.92	13.93	13.93	SB
10	Małgorzata Trybańska	Poland	13.90	13.54	13.85	13.90	
11	Ineta Radēviča	Latvia	13.89	13.76	13.86	13.89	=PB
12	Svetlana Bolshakova	Belgium	13.52	13.59	13.83	13.83	
13	Haoua Kessely	France	13.77	13.58	13.82	13.82	
14	Katja Demut	Germany	13.81	13.57	13.50	13.81	
15	Paraskevi Papahristou	Greece	X	13.72	X	13.72	
16	Carmen Toma	Romania	13.66	X	X	13.66	
17	Veera Baranova	Estonia	13.29	13.37	13.42	13.42	
18	Inger Anne Frøysedal	Norway	13.11	X	X	13.11	
19	Andriana Banova	Bulgaria	X	13.05	X	13.05	
	Niki Paneta	Greece				DNS	

=== Final ===
The Final was held at 14:45.

Rank	Athlete	Nationality	#1	#2	#3	#4	#5	#6	Result	Note
1st place, gold medalist(s)	Simona La Mantia	Italy	14.17	14.60	14.49	X	14.60	X	14.60	WL PB
2nd place, silver medalist(s)	Olesya Zabara	Russia	14.08	13.98	14.45	12.59	14.21	14.28	14.45	SB
3rd place, bronze medalist(s)	Dana Veldáková	Slovakia	X	14.39	14.09	X	X	14.26	14.39	SB
4	Snežana Rodic	Slovenia	14.34	14.24	14.35	X	14.27	X	14.35	PB
5	Cristina Bujin	Romania	14.19	X	14.08	13.98	X	X	14.19	SB
6	Natalya Kutyakova	Russia	13.54	14.18	13.65	X	X	14.13	14.18	
DQ	Athanasia Perra	Greece	~~14.01~~	X	X	~~13.24~~	~~13.78~~	X	~~14.01~~	Doping
7	Petia Dacheva	Bulgaria	X	13.84	13.49	13.07	12.28	X	13.84	
