= 2010 European Athletics Championships – Women's triple jump =

Women's triple jump at the European Athletics Championships

The women's triple jump at the 2010 European Athletics Championships was held at the Estadi Olímpic Lluís Companys on 29 and 31 July.

== Medalists ==
Gold	Olha Saladukha; Ukraine (UKR)
Silver	Simona La Mantia; Italy (ITA)
Bronze	Svetlana Bolshakova; Belgium (BEL)

== Records ==
Standing records prior to the 2010 European Athletics Championships
World record	Inessa Kravets (UKR)	15.50	Gothenburg, Sweden	10 August 1995
European record	Inessa Kravets (UKR)	15.50	Gothenburg, Sweden	10 August 1995
Championship record	Tatyana Lebedeva (RUS)	15.15	Gothenburg, Sweden	9 August 2006
World Leading	Yargelis Savigne (CUB)	15.09	Monaco	22 July 2010
European Leading	Olha Saladukha (UKR)	14.78	Yalta, Ukraine	29 May 2010
Broken records during the 2010 European Athletics Championships
European Leading	Olha Saladukha (UKR)	14.81	Barcelona, Spain	31 July 2010

== Schedule ==
Date	Time	Round
29 July 2010	12:30	Qualification
31 July 2010	19:10	Final

== Results ==
=== Qualification ===
Qualification: Qualification Performance 14.20 (Q) or at least 12 best performers advance to the final

Rank	Group	Athlete	Nationality	#1	#2	#3	Result	Notes
1	A	Nadezhda Alekhina	Russia	14.03	14.18	14.93	14.93	Q
2	A	Dana Velďáková	Slovakia	x	14.11	14.59	14.59	Q
3	B	Olha Saladukha	Ukraine	14.49			14.49	Q
4	A	Adelina Gavrilă	Romania	14.48			14.48	Q, SB
5	B	Snežana Rodič	Slovenia	14.47			14.47	Q, PB
6	B	Małgorzata Trybańska	Poland	14.44			14.44	Q, NR
7	B	Svetlana Bolshakova	Belgium	14.03	13.87	14.33	14.33	Q
8	A	Natallia Viatkina	Belarus	x	14.30		14.30	Q
DQ	A	Athanasia Perra	Greece	~~14.14~~	~~14.18~~	~~14.25~~	~~14.25~~	Q, Doping
9	A	Simona La Mantia	Italy	13.83	14.16	14.10	14.16	q
10	A	Patrícia Mamona	Portugal	13.69	x	14.12	14.12	q, NR
11	B	Alsu Murtazina	Russia	14.00	14.07	11.72	14.07	q, SB
12	A	Liliya Kulyk	Ukraine	x	13.81	14.04	14.04	
13	B	Carmen Toma	Romania	13.92	x	14.03	14.03	SB
14	A	Anna Jagaciak	Poland	x	13.85	14.03	14.03	
15	B	Kseniya Dzetsuk	Belarus	x	13.94	14.01	14.01	
16	B	Veera Baranova	Estonia	13.97	x	13.48	13.97	
17	B	Andriana Banova	Bulgaria	13.95	13.94	x	13.95	
18	B	Natalia Kutyakova	Russia	13.13	13.94	13.65	13.94	
19	B	Alina Elena Popescu	Romania	13.47	13.54	13.58	13.58	
20	B	Inger Anne Frøysedal	Norway	13.51	x	13.22	13.51	
21	A	Patricia Sarrapio	Spain	x	x	13.21	13.21	
	A	Petya Dacheva	Bulgaria	x	x	x	NM	
	B	Katja Demut	Germany	x	x	x	NM	

=== Final ===
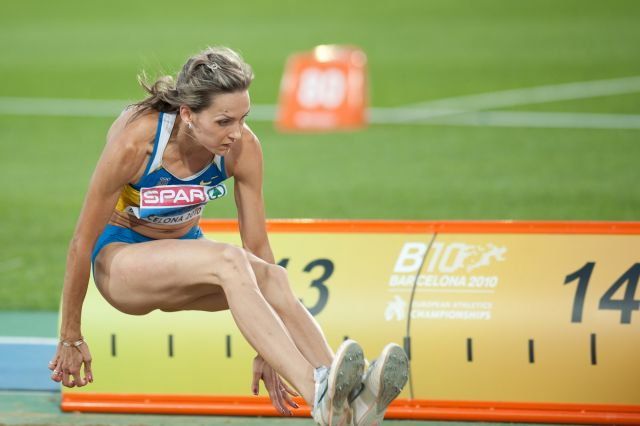
Ukrainian Saladukha leaped to 14.81 m to win the European title.

Rank	Athlete	Nationality	#1	#2	#3	#4	#5	#6	Result	Notes
1st place, gold medalist(s)	Olha Saladukha	Ukraine	x	14.62	14.80	x	14.81	14.71	14.81	EL
2nd place, silver medalist(s)	Simona La Mantia	Italy	14.56	x	13.97	14.21	x	x	14.56	SB
3rd place, bronze medalist(s)	Svetlana Bolshakova	Belgium	13.77	14.39	14.55	x	14.39	14.08	14.55	NR
4	Nadezhda Alekhina	Russia	14.10	14.40	14.21	14.45	11.90	14.31	14.45	
5	Adelina Gavrilă	Romania	14.24	14.33	14.18	14.15	14.07	14.15	14.33	
6	Snežana Rodič	Slovenia	14.15	14.32	14.09	x	x	14.25	14.32	
7	Dana Velďáková	Slovakia	14.12	12.54	14.16	13.72	14.08	x	14.16	
8	Patrícia Mamona	Portugal	14.07	13.50	13.75	x	13.75	14.02	14.07	
9	Natallia Viatkina	Belarus	x	13.85	13.94				13.94	
DQ	Athanasia Perra	Greece	x	~~13.62~~	~~13.83~~				~~13.83~~	Doping
10	Małgorzata Trybańska	Poland	x	13.81	13.82				13.82	
11	Alsu Murtazina	Russia	13.65	13.41	x				13.65	
