= Yuliana Pérez =

American triple jumper of Cuban heritage (born 1981)

Personal information
- Full name: Yuliana Pérez Martinéz in a new post from the New
- Nationality: United States
- Born: 21 July 1981 (age 44) Tucson, Arizona, United; States
- Height: 1.75 m (5 ft 9 in)
- Weight: 70 kg (154 lb)

Sport
- Sport: Athletics
- Event: Triple jump
- College team: Pima Community of Excellence in Sport College; Arizona Wildcats
- Club: Tucson Elite Athletic Club
- Coached by: Dick Booth

Achievements and titles
- Personal best: Triple jump: 14.23 (2003)
Medal record
Women's athletics
Representing the United States
Pan American Games
Silver medal – second place	2003 Santo Domingo	Triple jump

Yuliana Pérez Martinéz (born July 21, 1981) is an American triple jumper of Cuban heritage. Holding a dual citizenship to compete internationally, she attained two U.S. outdoor championship titles (2002 and 2003) in the triple jump, picked up a silver medal at the 2003 Pan American Games in Santo Domingo, Dominican Republic, and finished twenty-eighth at the 2004 Summer Olympics. During her track and field career, Perez has acquired a personal best of 14.23 m (46 ft 8 in) and 13.80 m (45 ft 3 1/4 in) each in the outdoors and indoors, respectively.

== Early life ==
Born in Tucson, Arizona to Cuban immigrants, Perez spent most of her early childhood in adversity. Her father Juan Carlos Martínez Vallez was arrested upon his arrival in the United States for criminal charges, and thereby sentenced to life imprisonment in Georgia; her mother Osmayda Pérez was killed by a stray bullet under obscure circumstances in a neighborhood shooting in San Diego, California. Following her mother's untimely demise, Perez and her two younger brothers bounced around homes for a couple of years, before being sent back to Havana, Cuba, to live with their paternal grandmother.

While residing in Cuba throughout her childhood and teenage years, Perez developed herself into one of the country's most promising young athletes, taking three high school championship titles and a silver medal in the triple jump from the 1997 Junior Pan American Games. In late 1999, Perez dropped from the Cuban sports program after she refused to forego her American citizenship in exchange for the possible trip to the 2000 Summer Olympics in Sydney as part of the Cuban squad.

Upon her arrival to the United States in early 2000 with just a backpack full of clothes and a reservation at a foster home, Perez left herself meager, jobless, and inarticulate in English, until she was befriended by social worker Cruz Olivarria, who invited to live with her in downtown Tucson. Working initially as a waitress, Perez restarted her athletic career through a series of radiant gestures from strangers that quickly helped her enroll on a sports scholarship at Pima Community College.

== Career ==
While studying at Pima and competing for the Aztecs, Perez blossomed her freshman season by recording the team's longest triple jump at 14.01 m (45 ft 11 1/2 in), eight inches farther than her personal best in Cuba. In 2001, Perez quickly loomed into the national scene at the USA Outdoor Championships in Eugene, Oregon, where she surged past the U.S. record holder and 1996 Olympian Sheila Hudson with a remarkable leap of 13.98 m (45 ft 10 1/4 in), to finish second in the triple jump but lost to Tiombe Hurd by two inches and a quarter. On that same year, Perez had a golden opportunity to represent the United States on her international debut at the 2001 Summer Universiade in Beijing, China, where she nearly missed out the podium with a fourth-place finish in the same event.

At the 2002 U.S. Championships in Palo Alto, California, Perez slammed her first ever title with a wind-aided jump of 14.20 m (46 ft 7 in), surpassing the 14-meter barrier and edging out runner-up Vanitta Kinard by a few inches. As the 2003 season had commenced, Perez exhausted her eligibility at Pima upon receiving her undergraduate college degree, and then transferred to the University of Arizona to train full-time with head coach Fred Harvey for the Arizona Wildcats.

In June 2003, Perez managed to defend her title at the U.S. Outdoor Championships with an upgraded personal best of 14.23 m (46 ft 8 in), moving her up to the top 20 in the world and securing her a spot on the U.S. track and field team for the World Championships and Pan American Games. Two months later, Perez did not reach the final round of the women's triple jump at the IAAF World Championships in Paris, France, but redeemed her strength to capture the silver medal at the Pan American Games in Santo Domingo, Dominican Republic with a jump of 13.99 metres.

Perez entered the 2004 Summer Olympics in Athens on her official debut, as a member of the U.S. Olympic track and field team, in the women's triple jump. Two months before the Games, she initially finished sixth at the Olympic Trials in Sacramento, California, but retained a permanent spot on the U.S. team by having achieved the Olympic A-standard of 14.23 m (46 ft 8 in) from the 2003 U.S. Outdoor Championships. Perez got off to a rough start with a foul on her opening attempt but managed to jump 13.62 m as a top qualifying mark on her second attempt. Since her third jump was slightly shorter than her best result by eleven centimeters, Perez ended up in twenty-eighth place out of thirty-three athletes and did not advance past the qualifying round.

Outside of her college track and field career, Perez also trained for Tucson Elite Athletic Club under legendary coach Dick Booth.
