= 2003 European Athletics U23 Championships – Women's triple jump =

The women's triple jump event at the 2003 European Athletics U23 Championships was held in Bydgoszcz, Poland, at Zawisza Stadion on 18 and 20 July.

== Medalists ==
Gold	Viktoriya Gurova; Russia
Silver	Simona La Mantia; Italy
Bronze	Ineta Radēviča; Latvia

== Results ==
=== Final ===
20 July

Rank	Name	Nationality	Attempts						Result	Notes
Rank	Name	Nationality	1	2	3	4	5	6	Result	Notes
1st place, gold medalist(s)	Viktoriya Gurova	Russia	14.26 (w: 0.2 m/s)	14.26 (w: -0.1 m/s)	14.37 (w: 1.4 m/s)	14.18 (w: 1.8 m/s)	x	x	14.37 (w: 1.4 m/s)	
2nd place, silver medalist(s)	Simona La Mantia	Italy	14.09 (w: 0.2 m/s)	x	14.31 (w: 2.0 m/s)	x	x	14.28 (w: 0.0 m/s)	14.31 (w: 2.0 m/s)	
3rd place, bronze medalist(s)	Ineta Radēviča	Latvia	14.01 (w: 0.5 m/s)	13.93 (w: 0.5 m/s)	14.04 (w: 1.2 m/s)	13.99 (w: 1.5 m/s)	12.12.08	11.99 (w: 0.6 m/s)	14.04 (w: 1.2 m/s)	
4	Dana Velďáková	Slovakia	13.89 (w: 0.5 m/s)	14.02 (w: 1.0 m/s)	13.82 (w: 0.0 m/s)	13.64 (w: 0.1 m/s)	x	13.90 (w: 1.1 m/s)	14.02 (w: 1.0 m/s)	
5	Katja Demut	Germany	13.40 (w: 0.5 m/s)	x	11.39 (w: 1.5 m/s)	13.74 (w: 0.3 m/s)	x	123.58 (w: -0.4 m/s)	13.74 (w: 0.3 m/s)	
6	Ancuța Stucan	Romania	13.67 (w: 0.7 m/s)	13.59 (w: 0.4 m/s)	x	13.25 (w: 0.3 m/s)	x	x	13.67 (w: 0.7 m/s)	
7	Irina Beskrovnaja	Slovakia	13.56 (w: 1.0 m/s)	13.23 (w: 1.2 m/s)	13.30 (w: 1.8 m/s)	13.44 (w: -0.3 m/s)	13.34 (w: 0.1 m/s)	x	13.56 (w: 1.0 m/s)	
8	Yeoryia Yiannakitsidou	Greece	x	x	13.47 (w: 1.0 m/s)	x	x	13.32 (w: -0.4 m/s)	13.47 (w: 1.0 m/s)	
9	Kateryna Chernyavska	Ukraine	x	13.21 (w: 0.2 m/s)	x				13.21 (w: 0.2 m/s)	
10	Anastasiya Ilyina	Russia	x	x	13.00 (w: 1.6 m/s)				13.00 (w: 1.6 m/s)	
11	Snežana Vukmirović	Slovenia	11.49 (w: 1.0 m/s)	11.81 (w: -0.3 m/s)	12.89 (w: -0.8 m/s)				12.89 (w: -0.8 m/s)	
	Alina Dinu	Romania	x	–	–				NM	

=== Qualifications ===
18 July
Qualifying 13.75 or 12 best to the Final

==== Group A ====
Rank	Name	Nationality	Result	Notes
1	Viktoriya Gurova	Russia	14.03 (w: 0.8 m/s)	Q
2	Dana Velďáková	Slovakia	13.66 (w: 0.9 m/s)	q
3	Ancuța Stucan	Romania	13.63 (w: 0.5 m/s)	q
4	Yeoryia Yiannakitsidou	Greece	13.51 (w: 0.0 m/s)	q
5	Katja Demut	Germany	13.29 (w: 0.6 m/s)	q
6	Stéphanie Luzieux	France	13.15 (w: 0.8 m/s)	
7	Giovanna Franzon	Italy	13.09 (w: 1.3 m/s)	
8	Alesya Lyasun	Belarus	12.82 (w: 1.3 m/s)	
9	Mariann Ahuna	Estonia	12.11 (w: 1.2 m/s)	

==== Group B ====
Rank	Name	Nationality	Result	Notes
1	Simona La Mantia	Italy	14.06 (w: 0.6 m/s)	Q
2	Alina Dinu	Romania	14.00 (w: 0.6 m/s)	Q
3	Ineta Radēviča	Latvia	13.91 (w: 1.6 m/s)	Q
4	Kateryna Chernyavska	Ukraine	13.75 (w: 0.6 m/s)	Q
5	Irina Beskrovnaja	Slovakia	13.48 (w: 0.0 m/s)	q
6	Snežana Vukmirović	Slovenia	13.47 (w: 0.0 m/s)	q
7	Anastasiya Ilyina	Russia	13.45 (w: 0.6 m/s)	q
8	Nelly Tchayem	France	13.01 (w: 0.0 m/s)	
9	Nina Serbezova	Bulgaria	12.99 (w: 1.5 m/s)	
10	Sanda Petričević	Croatia	12.87 (w: 1.7 m/s)	

== Participation ==
According to an unofficial count, 19 athletes from 14 countries participated in the event.

- Belarus (1)
- Bulgaria (1)
- Croatia (1)
- Estonia (1)
- France (2)
- Germany (1)
- Greece (1)
- Italy (2)
- Latvia (1)
- Romania (2)
- Russia (2)
- Slovakia (2)
- Slovenia (1)
- Ukraine (1)
