= Puzanov =

Puzanov (Russian: Пузанов, from пузо meaning belly) is a Russian masculine surname, its feminine counterpart is Puzanova. It may refer to

- Alexander Puzanov (1906–1998), Russian statesman
- Nikolay Puzanov (1938–2008), Russian biathlete
- Yekaterina Puzanova (born 1979), Russian middle distance runner
