= Athletics at the 2003 Summer Universiade – Women's triple jump =

The women's triple jump event at the 2003 Summer Universiade was held on 29 August in Daegu, South Korea.

== Results ==
Rank	Athlete	Nationality	#1	#2	#3	#4	#5	#6	Result	Notes
1st place, gold medalist(s)	Oksana Rogova	Russia	13.92	14.16	14.00	14.06	13.92	13.90	14.16	
2nd place, silver medalist(s)	Viktoriya Gurova	Russia	13.77	13.49	x	14.14	x	x	14.14	
3rd place, bronze medalist(s)	Mariana Solomon	Romania	x	13.67	14.09	13.86	13.76	13.97	14.09	
4	Ancuta Stucan	Romania	x	x	13.98	x	x	13.78	13.98	
5	Dana Velďáková	Slovakia	13.78	13.71	x	13.92	13.80	x	13.92	
6	Zita Ajkler	Hungary	13.42	13.42	13.19	x	x	13.18	13.42	
7	Amy Zongo	France	12.86	13.24	13.07	x	13.07	12.80	13.24	
8	Marija Martinović	Serbia and Montenegro	13.12	13.04	x	13.01	x	x	13.12	
9	Sirkka-Liisa Kivine	Estonia	x	13.09	13.08				13.09	
10	Jung Hye-kyung	South Korea	12.83	12.96	13.01				13.01	
11	Mei Ngew Sin	Malaysia	12.95	12.24	12.72				12.95	
12	Veera Baranova	Estonia	x	x	12.59				12.59	
13	Liana Hovhannisyan	Armenia	x	12.41	12.34				12.41	
	Cathy Rubinos	Peru	x	x	x				NM	
	Wacharee Rittiwat	Thailand							DNS	
