= Athletics at the 2003 Pan American Games – Women's triple jump =

Women's triple jump at the Pan American Games

The final of the Women's Triple Jump event at the 2003 Pan American Games took place on Friday August 8, 2003.

== Medalists ==
Gold	Mabel Gay; Cuba
Silver	Yuliana Pérez; United States
Bronze	Yusmay Bicet; Cuba

== Records ==
World Record	Inessa Kravets (UKR)	15.50 m	August 10, 1995	Gothenburg, Sweden
Pan Am Record	Yamilé Aldama (CUB)	14.77 m	July 28, 1999	Winnipeg, Canada

== Results ==
Rank	Athlete	Attempts						Final
Rank	Athlete	1	2	3	4	5	6	Result
1	Mabel Gay (CUB)	14.30	13.86	X	14.10	14.42	-	14.42 m
2	Yuliana Pérez (USA)	X	X	13.72	13.55	13.74	13.99	13.99 m
3	Yusmay Bicet (CUB)	13.47	13.90	X	X	13.47	X	13.90 m
4	Suzette Lee (JAM)	13.83	13.75	13.57	X	13.83	X	13.83 m
5	Tiombe Hurd (USA)	13.02	13.52	X	13.35	13.68	13.59	13.68 m
6	María Espencer (DOM)	13.45	13.51	13.66	13.64	13.32	X	13.66 m
7	Colleen Scott (JAM)	13.17	13.63	13.31	13.45	X	13.17	13.63 m
8	María José Paiz (GUA)	13.09	12.60	X	12.97	X	X	13.09 m
9	Mónica Falcioni (URU)	12.82	13.01	13.02				13.02 m
10	Daisy Ugarte (BOL)	12.30	11.83	11.65				12.30 m

== See also ==
- 2003 World Championships in Athletics – Women's triple jump
- Athletics at the 2004 Summer Olympics – Women's triple jump
