= 2006 European Athletics Championships – Women's triple jump =

Women's triple jump at the European Athletics Championships

The women's triple jump at the 2006 European Athletics Championships were held at the Ullevi on August 8 and August 9.

== Medalists ==
Gold	Silver	Bronze
Tatyana Lebedeva; Russia	Hrysopiyi Devetzi; Greece	Anna Pyatykh; Russia

== Schedule ==
Date	Time	Round
August 8, 2006	10:05	Qualification
August 9, 2006	17:45	Final

== Results ==
=== Qualification ===
Qualification: Qualifying Performance 14.05 (Q) or at least 12 best performers (q) advance to the final.

Rank	Group	Athlete	Nationality	#1	#2	#3	Result	Notes
1	B	Hrysopiyi Devetzi	Greece	x	14.64		14.64	Q
2	A	Tatyana Lebedeva	Russia	14.36			14.36	Q
3	A	Olesya Bufalova	Russia	14.34			14.34	Q
4	A	Natallia Safronava	Belarus	13.95	14.21		14.21	Q
5	B	Tereza Marinova	Bulgaria	14.03	14.17		14.17	Q
6	B	Anna Pyatykh	Russia	14.11			14.11	Q
7	A	Carlota Castrejana	Spain	x	14.08		14.08	Q
8	B	Teresa Nzola Meso Ba	France	13.58	13.74	14.07	14.07	Q, PB
9	B	Olha Saladukha	Ukraine	14.06			14.06	Q
10	B	Adelina Gavrilă	Romania	13.68	x	14.00	14.00	q
11	B	Camilla Johansson	Sweden	x	x	13.94	13.94	q
12	A	Małgorzata Trybańska	Poland	13.55	13.93	x	13.93	q
13	A	Dímitra Márkou	Greece	13.38	13.03	13.86	13.86	
14	A	Magdelín Martínez	Italy	13.84	13.77	x	13.84	
15	A	Amy Zongo	France	13.38	x	13.67	13.67	
16	A	Natalia Kilpeläinen	Finland	13.58	13.66	x	13.66	
17	B	Irina Beskrovnaja	Slovakia	13.20	13.45	13.60	13.60	
18	B	Patricia Sarrapio	Spain	13.57	x	x	13.57	
19	B	Veera Baranova	Estonia	x	13.37	13.56	13.56	
20	A	Šárka Kašpárková	Czech Republic	x	13.39	x	13.39	
21	A	Alexandra Zelenina	Moldova	x	13.12	x	13.12	
22	B	Julia Dubina	Georgia	x	x	12.77	12.77	
23	A	Zita Ajkler	Hungary	12.42	x	12.05	12.42	
24	A	Dana Velďáková	Slovakia	x	11.44	x	11.44	
	B	Simona La Mantia	Italy	x	x	x	NM	

=== Final ===
Rank	Athlete	Nationality	#1	#2	#3	#4	#5	#6	Result	Notes
1st place, gold medalist(s)	Tatyana Lebedeva	Russia	14.31	14.69	14.89	14.92	14.76	15.15	15.15	CR
2nd place, silver medalist(s)	Hrysopiyi Devetzi	Greece	15.05	14.24	x	x	14.50	14.43	15.05	SB
3rd place, bronze medalist(s)	Anna Pyatykh	Russia	x	14.64	14.85	12.91	14.47	15.02	15.02	PB
4	Olha Saladukha	Ukraine	14.06	14.35	12.35	14.38	14.14	14.05	14.38	PB
5	Olesya Bufalova	Russia	14.23	11.74	13.98	14.07	14.16	14.02	14.23	
6	Tereza Marinova	Bulgaria	x	14.20	13.97	14.02	14.16	14.09	14.20	
7	Adelina Gavrilă	Romania	x	x	14.19	x	13.92	x	14.19	
8	Natallia Safronava	Belarus	14.13	14.02	x	14.02	x	14.05	14.13	
9	Teresa Nzola Meso Ba	France	13.76	x	13.60				13.76	
10	Camilla Johansson	Sweden	13.74	13.70	13.57				13.74	
11	Carlota Castrejana	Spain	x	13.74	x				13.74	
12	Małgorzata Trybańska	Poland	13.53	13.61	x				13.61	
