= Athletics at the 2010 South American Games – Women's triple jump =

The Women's Triple Jump event at the 2010 South American Games was held on March 22 at 17:30.

== Medalists ==
Gold	Silver	Bronze
Munich Tovar; Venezuela	Bianca dos Santos; Brazil	Feber Hernández; Venezuela

== Records ==
Standing records prior to the 2010 South American Games
World record	Inessa Kravets	Ukraine	15.50m	Gothenburg, Sweden	10 August 1995
World Leading	Yarianna Martínez	Cuba	14.15m	Havana, Cuba	11 February 2010
South American record	Keila Costa	Brazil	14.57m	São Paulo, Brazil	9 June 2007
South American U23 record	Keila Costa	Brazil	14.00m	São Caetano, Brazil	22 April 2001

== Results ==
Results were published.

=== Final ===
Rank	Athlete	Nationality	Attempt						Best Result	Notes
Rank	Athlete	Nationality	1	2	3	4	5	6	Best Result	Notes
1st place, gold medalist(s)	Munich Tovar	Venezuela	13.25	x	12.94	x	13.06	13.06	13.25 wind: +2.0 m/s	
2nd place, silver medalist(s)	Bianca dos Santos	Brazil	13.06	13.20	x	x	11.61	12.58	13.20 wind: +1.2 m/s	PB
3rd place, bronze medalist(s)	Feber Hernández	Venezuela	12.88	x	12.43	12.73	12.51	–	12.88 wind: +0.2 m/s	
4	Marta Ocoro	Colombia	12.59	12.32	12.28	12.74	12.55	12.45	12.74 wind: +1.2 m/s	
5	Diana Paola Sinisterra	Colombia	x	12.71	12.67	12.35	12.50	12.67	12.71 wind: +0.7 m/s	
6	Giselle de Albuquerque	Brazil	x	12.31	x	x	x	x	12.31 wind: +1.8 m/s	
7	Carla Cavero	Bolivia	12.01	11.79	11.65	11.67	11.94	x	12.01 wind: +2.7 m/s	w
8	Camila Salas	Chile	11.54	x	11.58	11.47	11.54	x	11.58 wind: +0.8 m/s	

== See also ==
- 2010 South American Under-23 Championships in Athletics
