= 2007 European Athletics Indoor Championships – Women's triple jump =

The Women's triple jump event at the 2007 European Athletics Indoor Championships was held on March 2–4.

== Medalists ==
Gold	Silver	Bronze
Carlota Castrejana; Spain	Olesya Bufalova; Russia	Teresa Nzola Meso Ba; France

== Results ==
=== Qualification ===
Qualifying perf. 14.10 (Q) or 8 best performers (q) advanced to the Final.

Rank	Athlete	Nationality	#1	#2	#3	Result	Note
1	Adelina Gavrilă	Romania	14.24			14.24	Q
2	Olesya Bufalova	Russia	14.20			14.20	Q
3	Oksana Udmurtova	Russia	14.10			14.10	Q
4	Mariya Dimitrova	Bulgaria	13.72	14.08	X	14.08	q, SB
5	Carlota Castrejana	Spain	13.53	13.39	14.00	14.00	q
6	Natallia Safronava	Belarus	13.74	13.93	–	13.93	q
7	Dana Veldáková	Slovakia	13.80	13.86	13.90	13.90	q
8	Teresa Nzola Meso Ba	France	13.58	13.78	13.87	13.87	q
9	Patricia Sarrapio	Spain	13.44	13.70	13.80	13.80	
10	Irina Beskrovnaja	Slovakia	13.32	13.53	13.55	13.55	
11	Athanasia Perra	Greece	13.47	13.53	12.83	13.47	
12	Susana Costa	Portugal	13.32	13.43	13.17	13.43	
13	Cristina Bujin	Romania	X	13.31	X	13.31	

=== Final ===
Rank	Athlete	Nationality	#1	#2	#3	#4	#5	#6	Result	Note
1st place, gold medalist(s)	Carlota Castrejana	Spain	14.36	13.82	14.64	14.41	14.28	X	14.64	NR
2nd place, silver medalist(s)	Olesya Bufalova	Russia	14.09	X	14.37	14.40	14.50	14.41	14.50	SB
3rd place, bronze medalist(s)	Teresa Nzola Meso Ba	France	12.43	X	14.49	14.44	14.24	14.38	14.49	NR
4	Oksana Udmurtova	Russia	14.24	14.26	14.05	14.41	X	14.26	14.41	SB
5	Adelina Gavrilă	Romania	14.19	X	X	X	X	14.05	14.19	
6	Dana Veldáková	Slovakia	14.09	14.13	14.02	14.05	14.06	14.01	14.13	
7	Mariya Dimitrova	Bulgaria	13.88	13.90	14.03	13.71	13.66	13.95	14.03	
8	Natallia Safronava	Belarus	X	X	13.72	X	X	13.82	13.82	
