= Athletics at the 2004 Summer Olympics – Women's triple jump =

Women's triple jump at the Games of the XXVIII Olympiad
- Olympic Athletics
- Venue: Olympic Stadium
- Date: 21–23 August
- Competitors: 33 from 24 nations
- Winning distance: 15.30 AF

Medalists
1st place, gold medalist(s)		Françoise Mbango Etone	Cameroon
2nd place, silver medalist(s)		Hrysopiyi Devetzi	Greece
3rd place, bronze medalist(s)		Tatyana Lebedeva	Russia

The women's triple jump competition at the 2004 Summer Olympics in Athens was held at the Olympic Stadium on 21–23 August.

Coming into the competition, reigning world champion Tatyana Lebedeva was a favorite, having jumped 15.34m and 15.33m. earlier in July, slightly improving her position as the number two jumper in history which she had held since 2000. World record holder Inessa Kravets from nine years earlier, was no longer a factor, but Yamilé Aldama was also jumping well with a 15.28 just three weeks before the Olympics.

In the qualifying round, Hrysopiyi Devetzi shocked everyone with her 15.32m automatic qualifier on her only attempt. That was a Beamonesque improvement of her personal best and placed her as the number three jumper in history at that point in time, just 2 cm short of Lebedeva. Only 14.45 was required as an automatic qualifier and 14 other women managed that, though none went over 14.90m.

In the first round of the final, Devetzi showed she was serious taking the early lead with 14.96m. In the second round Trecia-Kaye Smith jumped 15.02m but was overshadowed by Françoise Mbango Etone's 15.30 m (50 ft 2 1/4 in) African record, a 25 cm improvement over her own record best. In the third round Devetzi improved to 15.14m to move back into second place. In the fourth round Devetzi improved her position again to 15.25m with Aldama moving into third place with her best of the day 14.99m. In the fifth round Lebedeva finally got over 15m with a 15.04m to take third place. She solidified her position with a 15.14m in the final round but Etone also solidified her position with a second 15.30m. After fouling her first attempt, Etone had five successive jumps over 15m including two at 15.30m. It would be the first Olympic gold medal for Cameroon. Etone would go on to defend her medal four year later with Cameroon's second gold medal. Her winning 15.39m jump in Beijing stood as the second best jump in history until 2019.

Of the top 16 jumps in history, most are between Etone, Devetzi, Lebedeva and Aldama, and mostly from jumps in 2004. The only other athletes included in that group are two jumps by world record holder Kravets, two in 2019 by Yulimar Rojas and one each by Caterine Ibargüen and Yargelis Savigne (all three two time World Champions).

== Competition format ==
The competition consisted of two rounds, qualification and final. In qualification, each athlete jumped three times (stopping early if they made the qualifying distance). At least the top twelve athletes moved on to the final; if more than twelve reached the qualifying distance, all who did so advanced. Distances were reset for the final round. Finalists jumped three times, after which the eight best jumped three more times (with the best distance of the six jumps counted).

== Schedule ==
All times are Greece Standard Time (UTC+2)

Date	Time	Round
Saturday, 21 August 2004	20:35	Qualification
Monday, 23 August 2004	18:45	Final

== Records ==
Prior to the competition, the existing world record, Olympic record, and world leading jump were as follows:

World record	Inessa Kravets (UKR)	15.50 m	Gothenburg, Sweden	10 August 1995
Olympic record	Inessa Kravets (UKR)	15.33 m	Atlanta, United States	4 August 1996
World Leading	Tatyana Lebedeva (RUS)	15.36 m	Budapest, Hungary	6 March 2004

No new records were set during the competition.

== Results ==
=== Qualifying round ===
Rule: Qualifying standard 14.45 (Q) or at least 12 best qualified (q).

Rank	Group	Name	Nationality	#1	#2	#3	Result	Notes
1	A	Hrysopiyi Devetzi	Greece	15.32	—	—	15.32	Q, NR
2	A	Baya Rahouli	Algeria	14.89	—	—	14.89	Q, NR
3	B	Yamilé Aldama	Sudan	14.80	—	—	14.80	Q
4	A	Kéné Ndoye	Senegal	14.32	14.79	—	14.79	Q
5	A	Tatyana Lebedeva	Russia	14.71	—	—	14.71	Q
6	B	Huang Qiuyan	China	14.09	14.29	14.66	14.66	Q, SB
7	B	Trecia-Kaye Smith	Jamaica	x	14.65	—	14.65	Q
8	B	Anna Pyatykh	Russia	x	14.62	—	14.62	Q
9	B	Françoise Mbango Etone	Cameroon	14.61	—	—	14.61	Q
10	A	Magdelín Martínez	Italy	14.57	—	—	14.57	Q
11	A	Olena Hovorova	Ukraine	14.56	—	—	14.56	Q
11	B	Adelina Gavrilă	Romania	14.56	—	—	14.56	Q
13	A	Olga Vasdeki	Greece	x	14.54	—	14.54	Q, SB
14	A	Yusmay Bicet	Cuba	14.21	14.53	—	14.53	Q
15	A	Natallia Safronava	Belarus	14.52	—	—	14.52	Q, SB
16	A	Mariana Solomon	Romania	x	14.29	14.42	14.42	PB
17	B	Simona La Mantia	Italy	14.00	14.39	x	14.39	
18	B	Carlota Castrejana	Spain	14.32	14.37	x	14.37	=SB
19	A	Mariya Dimitrova	Bulgaria	x	x	14.16	14.16	
20	A	Ineta Radēviča	Latvia	14.12	14.03	14.06	14.12	PB
21	B	Viktoriya Gurova	Russia	14.04	x	14.03	14.04	
22	A	Tiombe Hurd	United States	13.98	13.97	13.93	13.98	
23	B	Heli Koivula Kruger	Finland	x	13.70	13.98	13.98	
24	A	Olga Bolşova	Moldova	13.90	13.87	13.64	13.90	
25	A	Tatyana Bocharova	Kazakhstan	13.18	13.41	13.81	13.81	
26	A	Šárka Kašpárková	Czech Republic	x	x	13.79	13.79	
27	B	Anastasiya Juravleva	Uzbekistan	13.64	13.52	13.51	13.64	
28	B	Yuliana Pérez	United States	x	13.62	13.51	13.62	
29	B	Liliana Zagacka	Poland	13.36	13.59	13.41	13.59	
30	B	Tetyana Shchurenko	Ukraine	x	13.12	13.55	13.55	
31	B	Julia Dubina	Georgia	13.36	12.61	12.90	13.36	
32	A	Zhang Hao	China	x	13.30	x	13.30	
33	B	Athanasia Perra	Greece	13.19	x	—	13.19	

=== Final ===
Rank	Name	Country	1	2	3	4	5	6	Result	Notes
1st place, gold medalist(s)	Françoise Mbango Etone	Cameroon	x	15.30	15.02	15.17	15.21	15.30	15.30	AF
2nd place, silver medalist(s)	Hrysopiyi Devetzi	Greece	14.96	14.59	15.14	15.25	x	14.92	15.25	
3rd place, bronze medalist(s)	Tatyana Lebedeva	Russia	x	14.84	14.95	x	15.04	15.14	15.14	
4	Trecia-Kaye Smith	Jamaica	x	15.02	13.23	x	x	14.70	15.02	
5	Yamilé Aldama	Sudan	x	14.90	14.74	14.99	13.92	14.19	14.99	
6	Baya Rahouli	Algeria	14.75	14.86	14.57	14.76	x	14.68	14.86	
7	Magdelín Martínez	Italy	14.70	14.85	14.58	14.50	14.51	14.76	14.85	
8	Anna Pyatykh	Russia	14.16	14.58	x	x	x	14.79	14.79	
9	Yusmay Bicet	Cuba	x	x	14.57	Did not advance			14.57	
10	Olena Hovorova	Ukraine	14.07	14.35	14.35	Did not advance			14.35	
11	Olga Vasdeki	Greece	14.34	14.08	x	Did not advance			14.34	
12	Huang Qiuyan	China	13.85	14.33	14.04	Did not advance			14.33	
13	Natallia Safronava	Belarus	14.20	x	14.22	Did not advance			14.22	
14	Kéné Ndoye	Senegal	x	14.09	14.18	Did not advance			14.18	
15	Adelina Gavrilă	Romania	x	x	13.86	Did not advance			13.86	
