= Shchurenko =

Shchurenko (Ukrainian: Щуренко) is a Ukrainian patronymic surname derived from the given name or nickname Schur, "rat". Notable people with the surname include

- Roman Shchurenko, Ukrainian long jumper
- Tetyana Shchurenko, Ukrainian triple jumper
