= Suzette Lee =

Jamaican triple jumper (born 1977)

Personal information
- Born: 6 March 1977 (age 49) Houston, Texas, United States

Sport
- Sport: Track and field
Medal record
Athletics
Representing Jamaica
Pan American Games
Silver medal – second place	1999 Winnipeg	Triple jump
CAC Championships
Gold medal – first place	2003 St George's	Triple jump
Silver medal – second place	2001 Guatemala City	Triple jump
Bronze medal – third place	1995 Guatemala City	Triple jump
CAC Games
Silver medal – second place	1999 Maracaibo	Triple jump
Bronze medal – third place	1993 Ponce	Triple jump
Bronze medal – third place	1993 Ponce	Long jump
CAC Junior Championships (U20)
Gold medal – first place	1994 Port of Spain	Triple jump
Silver medal – second place	1994 Port of Spain	Long jump
CAC Junior Championships (U17)
Gold medal – first place	1990 Havana	4x100 m relay
CARIFTA Games Junior (U20)
Gold medal – first place	1992 Nassau	4x400m relay
Bronze medal – third place	1992 Nassau	Long Jump
CARIFTA Games Youth (U17)
Gold medal – first place	1991 Port of Spain	Long Jump
Gold medal – first place	1990 Kingston	Long Jump

Suzette Lee (born 6 March 1977) is a Jamaican triple jumper.

== Career ==
Her personal best jump is 14.16 metres, achieved in April 2005 in Baton Rouge. She has an indoor mark of 14.25 metres, achieved in March 1997 in Indianapolis.

In July 2005 Lee was found guilty of salbutamol use at the EAA Karelia Games in Finland. She received a public warning rather than a lengthy ban. Nonetheless, she has not competed internationally since 2005.

== Achievements ==
Year	Competition	Venue	Position	Event	Notes
Representing Jamaica
1990	CARIFTA Games (U-17)	Kingston, Jamaica	1st	Long jump	5.80 m
1990	Central American and Caribbean Junior Championships (U-17)	Havana, Cuba	7th	Long jump	4.83 m (0.5 m/s)
1990	Central American and Caribbean Junior Championships (U-17)	Havana, Cuba	1st	4 × 100 m relay	46.66
1991	CARIFTA Games (U-17)	Port of Spain, Trinidad and Tobago	1st	Long jump	5.99 m
1992	CARIFTA Games (U-20)	Nassau, Bahamas	4th	400m hurdles	64.86
1992	CARIFTA Games (U-20)	Nassau, Bahamas	3rd	Long jump	5.97 m
1992	CARIFTA Games (U-20)	Nassau, Bahamas	1st	4 × 400 m relay	3:40.74
1992	World Junior Championships	Seoul, South Korea	7th	Triple jump	12.83 m (wind: +0.4 m/s)
1993	Central American and Caribbean Games	Ponce, Puerto Rico	3rd	Long jump	5.53 m
1993	Central American and Caribbean Games	Ponce, Puerto Rico	3rd	Triple jump	12.40 m
1994	Central American and Caribbean Junior Championships (U-20)	Port of Spain, Trinidad and Tobago	2nd	Long jump	5.88 m
1994	Central American and Caribbean Junior Championships (U-20)	Port of Spain, Trinidad and Tobago	1st	Triple jump	13.26 m
1994	World Junior Championships	Lisbon, Portugal	4th	Triple jump	13.41 m (wind: +1.7 m/s)
1995	Central American and Caribbean Championships	Guatemala City, Guatemala	3rd	Triple jump	13.67 m A
1996	Olympic Games	Atlanta, United States	20th (q)	Triple jump	13.65 m (1.0 m/s)
1997	World Championships	Athens, Greece	20th (q)	Triple jump	13.83 m (0.3 m/s)
1998	Central American and Caribbean Games	Maracaibo, Venezuela	2nd	Triple jump	13.77 m
1999	Pan American Games	Winnipeg, Canada	2nd	Triple jump	14.09 m
2001	Central American and Caribbean Championships	Guatemala City, Guatemala	2nd	Triple jump	13.75 m A
2002	Commonwealth Games	Manchester, United Kingdom	4th	Triple jump	13.54 m (-0.6 m/s)
2003	Central American and Caribbean Championships	St. George's, Grenada	1st	Triple jump	13.89 m (w)
2003	Pan American Games	Santo Domingo, Dominican Republic	4th	Triple jump	13.83 m (0.7 m/s)
2003	World Championships	Paris, France	27th (q)	Triple jump	13.43 m (1.3 m/s)
