= Natalya Kutyakova =

Russian triple jumper

Natalya Igorevna Kutyakova (Russian: Наталья Игоревна Кутякова; born February 17, 1986) is a Russian triple jumper.

== Achievements ==
Year	Competition	Venue	Position	Event	Notes
Representing Russia
2009	Universiade	Belgrade, Serbia	2nd	Triple jump	14.14 m
2010	European Championships	Barcelona, Spain	19th (q)	Triple jump	13.94 m
2011	European Indoor Championships	Paris, France	6th	Triple jump	14.18 m
