= Simona La Mantia =

Italian triple jumper (born 1983)

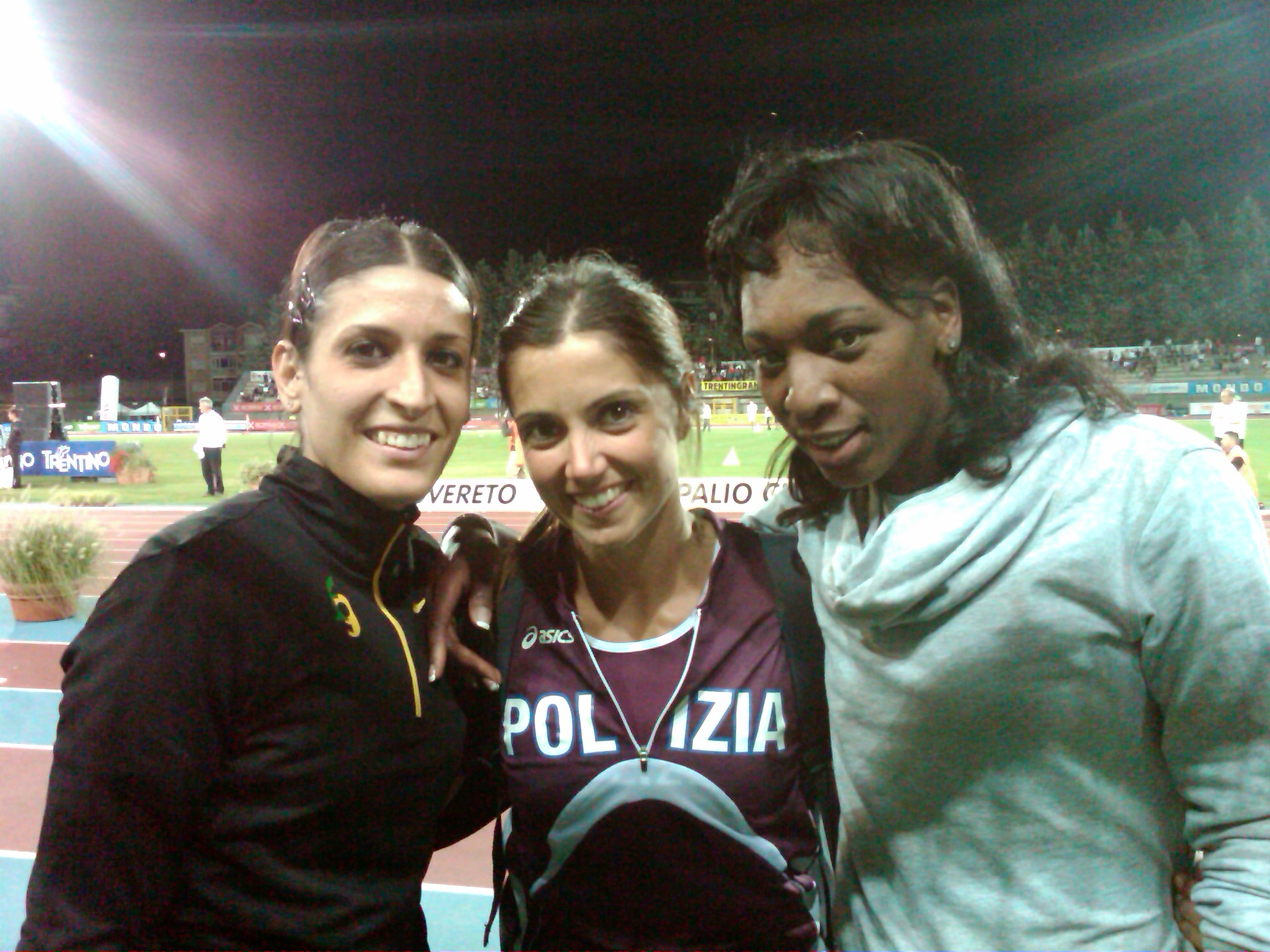
- Simona La Mantia (left)

Personal information
- Born: 14 April 1983 (age 43)
- Height: 1.77 m (5 ft 9 1/2 in)
- Weight: 64 kg (141 lb)

Sport
- Country: Italy
- Sport: Athletics
- Event: Triple jump
- Club: G.S. Fiamme Gialle

Achievements and titles
- Personal best: Triple jump: 14.69 m (2005)
Medal record
European Championships
Silver medal – second place	2010 Barcelona	Triple jump
European Indoor Championships
Gold medal – first place	2011 Paris	Triple jump
Bronze medal – third place	2013 Gothenburg	Triple jump
European U23 Championships
Gold medal – first place	2005 Erfurt	Triple jump
Silver medal – second place	2003 Bydgoszcz	Triple jump
European Team Championships
Silver medal – second place	2011 Stockholm	Triple jump
Bronze medal – third place	2013 Gateshead	Triple jump

Simona La Mantia (born 14 April 1983 in Palermo) is an Italian triple jumper. Her best result at international senior level was a gold medal at the 2011 European Indoor Championships.

== Biography ==
La Mantia's parents were both athletes: her mother Monica Mutschlechner was an 800 metres runner while her father Antonino La Mantia participated in the steeplechase.

Her first successes came the European Athletics U23 Championships, where she won silver in the triple jump in 2003, and improved to win the gold medal in 2005.

She represented Italy at the 2004 Summer Olympics and the 2005 World Championships in Athletics. In the 2004 Summer Olympics, she achieved seventh place in the qualification round, failing to secure qualification to the final. The exact same thing happened at the 2005 World Championships. She struggled with injuries over the following years but regained form in May 2010, jumping over 14 metres for the first time in four years. That year she also won a silver medal at the 2010 European Athletics Championships followed by a win in the triple jump at the 2011 European Athletics Indoor Championships.

Since then she has competed at the 2013 World Championships and won the bronze medal at the 2013 European Indoor Championships.

Her personal best jump is 14.69 metres, achieved in May 2005 in her hometown Palermo. In addition she has 6.48 m in the long jump. On 6 October 2012 she married Alessandro Tazzini.

== Achievements ==
Year	Competition	Venue	Position	Notes
Representing Italy
2002	World Junior Championships	(Jamaica) Kingston	8th	12.91 m (wind: -1.2 m/s)
2003	European U23 Championships	(Poland) Bydgoszcz	2nd	14.31 m (wind: 2.0 m/s)
2003	World Championships	(France) Paris	17th (q)	14.05 m
2004	World Indoor Championships	(Hungary) Budapest	11th	14.14 m
2004	Olympic Games	(Greece) Athens	17th (q)	14.39 m
2005	European Indoor Championships	(Spain) Madrid	8th	14.43 m
2005	European U23 Championships	(Germany) Erfurt	1st	14.43 m (wind: -0.6 m/s)
2005	World Championships	(Finland) Helsinki	14th (q)	14.00 m
2006	World Indoor Championships	(Russia) Moscow	16th (q)	13.61 m
2006	European Championships	(Sweden) Gothenburg	–	NM
2007	Universiade	(Thailand) Bangkok	4th	13.87 m
2010	European Championships	(Spain) Barcelona	2nd	14.56 m
2011	European Indoor Championships	(France) Paris	1st	14.60 m
2011	World Championships	(South Korea) Daegu	15th (q)	14.06 m
2012	European Championships	(Finland) Helsinki	4th	14.25 m
2012	Olympic Games	(United Kingdom) London	18th (q)	13.92 m
2013	European Indoor Championships	(Sweden) Gothenburg	3rd	14.26 m
2013	Mediterranean Games	(Turkey) Mersin	4th	13.97 m

== National titles ==
Simona La Mantia has won the individual national championship 12 times.

- 6 wins in the triple jump (2004, 2005, 2006, 2010, 2011, 2012)
- 6 wins in the triple jump indoor (2004, 2006, 2011, 2012, 2013, 2014)

== See also ==
- Italian all-time lists - Triple jump
