= Katja Demut =

German track and field athlete

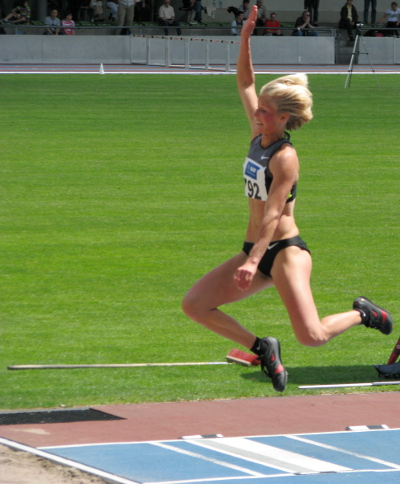
Katja Demut at Mannheim Competition 2012

Katja Demut (born 21 December 1983) is a German track and field athlete who specialises in the triple jump. She has represented Germany internationally at the European Athletics Indoor Championships and at the 2009 World Championships in Athletics. Her personal best of 14.57 metres outdoors and 14.47 m indoors are the German records for the event.

== Career ==
Born in Schmölln, she began competing in the event as a teenager, representing the TuS Jena club. Her first international appearance came at the 2000 World Junior Championships in Athletics, where she jumping in the qualifying rounds. She returned to the competition for the 2002 edition and reached the final, placing seventh overall.

Demut won her first national title at the German Athletics Championships 2003 and set a personal best of 13.74 m that year for fifth place at the 2003 European Athletics U23 Championships. She achieved a jump of 13.96 m in Stuttgart in February 2004 and had consecutive runner-up placings at the German Indoor Championships in 2004 and 2005. A quiet 2006 season for her was highlighted by an outdoor best jump of 13.96 m. She cleared the fourteen-metre mark for the first time the following year and claimed the national title both outdoors and indoors. Demut won the German outdoor title again in 2008 and placed sixth at the European Cup.

She made three international appearances in 2009: she jumped in the triple jump qualifiers at the 2009 European Athletics Indoor Championships, was eleventh at the 2009 European Team Championships, and then represented Germany for the first time at world senior level, taking part in the heats at the 2009 World Championships in Athletics in Berlin. That year she had won at the 2009 German Athletics Championships, improved her indoor best to 14.06 m and set an outright best of 14.20 m outdoors in Ulm. Demut retained her indoor German title the year after and had her fourth straight win outdoors at the 2010 German Athletics Championships. She jumped for her country at the 2010 European Athletics Championships, but failed to record a mark in the triple jump qualifiers.

Demut hit a new career high in 2011: she broke Petra Laux-Lobinger's German indoor record in Chemnitz with a clearance of 14.45 m and took it two centimetres further at the PSD Bank Meeting. She entered the 2011 European Athletics Indoor Championships as the athlete with the leading indoor mark of the season, but failed to match her previous form and was eliminated in the heats stage with a best jump of 13.81 m from her series. Demut set a new best outdoors as well, jumping 14.57 m in Wesel in June to improve the German outdoor record by eleven centimetres – this bettered Helga Radtke's mark which had stood for almost seventeen years. She was set to be a contender at the 2011 World Championships in Athletics, but a heel injury four days before the competition forced her to withdraw and bring her season to a close.

== Competition record ==
Year	Competition	Venue	Position	Event	Notes
Representing Germany
2000	World Junior Championships	Santiago, Chile	19th (q)	Triple jump	12.46 m (wind: +0.1 m/s)
2002	World Junior Championships	Kingston, Jamaica	7th	Triple jump	12.94 m (wind: +0.1 m/s)
2003	European U23 Championships	Bydgoszcz, Poland	5th	Triple jump	13.74 m
2005	European U23 Championships	Erfurt, Germany	12th	Triple jump	12.96 m
2009	European Indoor Championships	Turin, Italy	13th (q)	Triple jump	13.76 m
2009	World Championships	Berlin, Germany	34th (q)	Triple jump	11.38 m
2010	European Championships	Barcelona, Spain	–	Triple jump	NM
2011	European Indoor Championships	Gothenburg, Sweden	15th (q)	Triple jump	13.81 m
2012	European Championships	Helsinki, Finland	22nd (q)	Triple jump	13.31 m
2014	European Championships	Zürich, Switzerland	18th (q)	Triple jump	13.39 m
2015	European Indoor Championships	Prague, Czech Republic	11th (q)	Triple jump	13.81 m
