= Veera Baranova =

Estonian triple jumper

Personal information
- Born: 12 February 1984 (age 41)

Veera Baranova (born 12 February 1984) is an Estonian triple jumper.

== Achievements ==
Year	Competition	Venue	Position	Event	Notes
Representing Estonia
2003	European Junior Championships	Tampere, Finland	11th	Triple jump	12.77 m
2003	Universiade	Daegu, South Korea	12th	Triple jump	12.59 m
2005	European U23 Championships	Erfurt, Germany	7th	Triple jump	13.69 m (wind: +0.5 m/s)
2005	Universiade	İzmir, Turkey	5th	Triple jump	13.60 m
2006	European Championships	Gothenburg, Sweden	19th (q)	Triple jump	13.56 m
2010	European Championships	Barcelona, Spain	17th (q)	Triple jump	13.97 m
2011	European Indoor Championships	Paris, France	18th (q)	Triple jump	13.42 m
