= 2001 European Athletics U23 Championships – Women's triple jump =

The women's triple jump event at the 2001 European Athletics U23 Championships was held in Amsterdam, Netherlands, at Olympisch Stadion on 14 and 15 July.

== Medalists ==
Gold	Irina Vasilyeva; Russia
Silver	Marija Martinović; Yugoslavia
Bronze	Amy Zongo; France

== Results ==
=== Final ===
15 July

Rank	Name	Nationality	Attempts						Result	Notes
Rank	Name	Nationality	1	2	3	4	5	6	Result	Notes
1st place, gold medalist(s)	Irina Vasilyeva	Russia	13.80 (w: 1.3 m/s)	13.65 (w: 1.3 m/s)	13.57 (w: 1.4 m/s)	x	13.74 (w: 0.6 m/s)	x	13.80 (w: 1.3 m/s)	
2nd place, silver medalist(s)	Marija Martinović	Yugoslavia	x	x	13.54 (w: 1.3 m/s)	13.32 (w: 1.2 m/s)	13.72 (w: 0.0 m/s)	x	13.72 (w: 0.0 m/s)	
3rd place, bronze medalist(s)	Amy Zongo	France	13.64 (w: 1.3 m/s)	13.68 (w: 1.2 m/s)	13.36 (w: 1.5 m/s)	13.48 (w: 1.5 m/s)	12.92 (w: 1.2 m/s)	13.55 (w: 0.4 m/s)	13.68 (w: 1.2 m/s)	
4	Galina Sharova	Russia	13.60 (w: 0.7 m/s)	13.47 (w: 1.3 m/s)	13.45 (w: 1.3 m/s)	11.45 (w: -0.1 m/s)	13.54 (w: 2.0 m/s)	13.50 (w: 1.4 m/s)	13.60 (w: 0.7 m/s)	
5	Dana Velďáková	Slovakia	12.73 (w: 0.7 m/s)	13.34 (w: 0.5 m/s)	13.50 (w: 0.9 m/s)	13.23 (w: 0.9 m/s)	13.31 (w: 0.3 m/s)	13.24 (w: 0.7 m/s)	13.50 (w: 0.9 m/s)	
6	Constanța Ştucan	Romania	x	13.31 (w: 0.5 m/s)	x	x	13.37 (w: 0.2 m/s)	13.49 (w: 1.1 m/s)	13.49 (w: 1.1 m/s)	
7	Silvia Otto	Germany	13.04 (w: 0.8 m/s)	x	13.38 (w: 0.3 m/s)	12.93 (w: 0.3 m/s)	x	13.35 (w: 0.2 m/s)	13.38 (w: 0.3 m/s)	
8	Henny Gastel	Germany	13.01 (w: 1.7 m/s)	13.20 (w: 1.2 m/s)	13.16 (w: 1.1 m/s)	12.86 (w: 0.8 m/s)	x	x	13.20 (w: 1.2 m/s)	
9	Mariana Bogăţie	Romania	x	13.09 (w: 1.7 m/s)	13.16 (w: 1.8 m/s)				13.16 (w: 1.8 m/s)	
10	Vanessa Vlacancich	Italy	12.66 (w: 1.0 m/s)	12.89 (w: 1.1 m/s)	12.90 (w: 0.6 m/s)				12.90 (w: 0.6 m/s)	
11	Laura Tosoni	Italy	12.25 (w: 1.0 m/s)	12.56 (w: 0.2 m/s)	x				12.56 (w: 0.2 m/s)	
	Sara Brankell	Sweden	x	x	x				NM	

=== Qualifications ===
14 July
Qualifying 13.60 or 12 best to the Final

==== Group A ====
Rank	Name	Nationality	Result	Notes
1	Galina Sharova	Russia	13.97 (w: 1.4 m/s)	Q
2	Marija Martinović	Yugoslavia	13.63 (w: 1.4 m/s)	Q
3	Silvia Otto	Germany	13.29 (w: 1.1 m/s)	q
4	Constanța Ştucan	Romania	13.18 (w: 0.4 m/s)	q
5	Laura Tosoni	Italy	12.83 (w: 0.7 m/s)	q
6	Dana Velďáková	Slovakia	12.78 (w: -0.2 m/s)	q
7	Christelle Kailer-Grangenois	France	12.67 (w: 0.9 m/s)	
8	Olivia Wöckinger	Austria	12.20 (w: -0.2 m/s)	

==== Group B ====
Rank	Name	Nationality	Result	Notes
1	Irina Vasilyeva	Russia	13.89 (w: 0.0 m/s)	Q
2	Henny Gastel	Germany	13.11 (w: -0.3 m/s)	q
3	Vanessa Vlacancich	Italy	13.00 (w: 0.8 m/s)	q
4	Amy Zongo	France	12.99 (w: 0.4 m/s)	q
5	Mariana Bogăţie	Romania	12.93 (w: 1.2 m/s)	q
6	Sara Brankell	Sweden	12.87 (w: 1.0 m/s)	q
7	Dimitra Markou	Greece	12.67 (w: 0.5 m/s)	
8	Mariana Solomon	Romania	12.26 (w: 0.5 m/s)	

== Participation ==
According to an unofficial count, 16 athletes from 10 countries participated in the event.

- Austria (1)
- France (2)
- Germany (2)
- Greece (1)
- Italy (2)
- Romania (3)
- Russia (2)
- Slovakia (1)
- Sweden (1)
- Yugoslavia (1)
