= Athletics at the 2002 Asian Games – Women's triple jump =

Women's triple jump at the 2002 Asian Games
- Venue: Busan Asiad Main Stadium
- Date: 13 October 2002
- Competitors: 10 from 8 nations

Medalists
| gold medal | Huang Qiuyan | China |
| silver medal | Zhang Hao | China |
| bronze medal | Tatyana Bocharova | Kazakhstan |

The women's triple jump competition at the 2002 Asian Games in Busan, South Korea was held on 13 October at the Busan Asiad Main Stadium.

== Schedule ==
All times are Korea Standard Time (UTC+09:00)

| Date | Time | Event |
|---|---|---|
| Sunday, 13 October 2002 | 11:00 | Final |

== Records ==
Prior to this competition, the existing world, Asian and Games records were as follows.

| World Record | Inessa Kravets (UKR) | 15.50 | Gothenburg, Sweden | 10 August 1995 |
| Asian Record | Huang Qiuyan (CHN) | 14.72 | Guangzhou, China | 22 November 2001 |
| Games Record | Ren Ruiping (CHN) | 14.27 | Bangkok, Thailand | 18 December 1998 |

== Results ==
| Rank | Athlete | Attempt | | | | | | Result | Notes |
| Rank | Athlete | 1 | 2 | 3 | 4 | 5 | 6 | Result | Notes |
|---|---|---|---|---|---|---|---|---|---|
| 1st place, gold medalist(s) | Huang Qiuyan (CHN) | 14.05 −1.9 | 14.28; 0.0 | X | 14.19 −0.9 | X | X | 14.28 | GR |
| 2nd place, silver medalist(s) | Zhang Hao (CHN) | 13.84 −0.3 | X | 13.89 −0.1 | X | 13.57 +0.2 | 13.56 −0.2 | 13.89 | |
| 3rd place, bronze medalist(s) | Tatyana Bocharova (KAZ) | X | X | 13.23 −0.7 | X | X | 13.26 −1.2 | 13.26 | |
| 4 | Anju Bobby George (IND) | 13.26 −0.1 | 13.07 +0.5 | 13.18 −0.3 | X | 12.74 +0.7 | X | 13.26 | |
| 5 | Maho Hanaoka (JPN) | 13.19 −1.5 | X | 13.21 +0.1 | X | 13.15 −0.4 | X | 13.21 | |
| 6 | Phan Thị Thu Lan (VIE) | 12.73 +0.4 | 12.89 +0.3 | X | 13.11 −0.3 | 12.79 −0.2 | X | 13.11 | |
| 7 | Lee Kyong-sun (KOR) | X | 12.78 −0.4 | X | X | 12.65 −1.1 | 12.79 −1.5 | 12.79 | |
| 8 | Nguyễn Bích Vân (VIE) | 11.83 −0.4 | 12.46 −1.3 | 12.60 +0.4 | 12.22 +0.1 | 12.43 −1.8 | 12.29 −1.2 | 12.60 | |
| 9 | Wacharee Ritthiwat (THA) | X | 12.34 −1.2 | X | | | | 12.34 | |
| 10 | Mariya Sokova (UZB) | X | 11.32 −0.2 | — | | | | 11.32 | |
