= 2003 Asian Athletics Championships – Women's triple jump =

The women's triple jump event at the 2003 Asian Athletics Championships was held in Manila, Philippines on September 20.

== Results ==
Rank	Name	Nationality	Result	Notes
1st place, gold medalist(s)	Huang Qiuyan	China	14.39	SB
2nd place, silver medalist(s)	Anastasiya Juravleva	Uzbekistan	14.21	=SB
3rd place, bronze medalist(s)	Zhang Hao	China	13.63	
4	Wacharee Ritthiwat	Thailand	13.54	SB
5	Tatyana Bocharova	Kazakhstan	13.50	
6	Wang Kuo-Huei	Chinese Taipei	13.25	SB
7	Fumiyo Yoshida	Japan	13.09	
8	Ngew Sin Mei	Malaysia	12.93	
9	Manisha Dey	India	12.83	
10	Thitima Muangjan	Thailand	12.79	
11	Phan Thi Thu Lan	Vietnam	12.75	
12	Lo Yu-Hsin	Chinese Taipei	12.69	
	Elena Bobrovskaya	Kyrgyzstan	DNS	
