= 2003 World Championships in Athletics – Women's triple jump =

These are the official results of the Women's Triple Jump event at the 2003 World Championships in Paris, France. There were a total number of 29 participating athletes, with the final held on Tuesday 26 August 2003.

== Medalists ==
Gold	Tatyana Lebedeva; Russia (RUS)
Silver	Françoise Mbango Etone; Cameroon (CMR)
Bronze	Magdelín Martínez; Italy (ITA)

== Schedule ==
- All times are Central European Time (UTC+1)

Qualification round
Group A	Group B
24.08.2003–16:00h	24.08.2003–16:00h
Final round
26.08.2003–19:30h

== Abbreviations ==
- All results shown are in metres

Q	automatic qualification
q	qualification by rank
DNS	did not start
NM	no mark
WR	world record
AR	area record
NR	national record
PB	personal best
SB	season best

== Qualification ==
Rank	Athlete	Group A
1.	Magdelín Martínez (ITA)	14.73 m
2.	Tatyana Lebedeva (RUS)	14.62 m
3.	Olga Vasdeki (GRE)	14.50 m
4.	Mabel Gay (CUB)	14.43 m
5.	Huang Qiuyan (CHN)	14.26 m
6.	Yelena Oleynikova (RUS)	14.24 m
7.	Baya Rahouli (ALG)	14.22 m
8.	Olena Hovorova (UKR)	14.16 m
9.	Natallia Safronava (BLR)	14.05 m
10.	Olga Bolşova (MDA)	13.95 m
11.	Yuliana Perez (USA)	13.89 m
12.	Carlota Castrejana (ESP)	13.83 m
13.	Mariya Dimitrova (BUL)	13.61 m
14.	Cristina Nicolau (ROU)	13.48 m
15.	Suzette Lee (JAM)	13.43 m

Rank	Athlete	Group B
1.	Adelina Gavrilă (ROU)	14.45 m
2.	Françoise Mbango Etone (CMR)	14.37 m
3.	Hrysopiyi Devetzi (GRE)	14.34 m
4.	Anna Pyatykh (RUS)	14.28 m
5.	Barbara Lah (ITA)	14.25 m
6.	Kéné Ndoye (SEN)	14.20 m
7.	Heli Koivula Kruger (FIN)	14.10 m
8.	Yusmay Bicet (CUB)	14.06 m
9.	Simona La Mantia (ITA)	14.05 m
10.	Camilla Johansson (SWE)	13.87 m
11.	Nadezhda Bazhenova (RUS)	13.77 m
12.	Šárka Kašpárková (CZE)	13.75 m
13.	Tatyana Bocharova (KAZ)	13.40 m
—	Zhang Hao (CHN)	NM

== Final ==
Rank	Athlete	Attempts						Result	Note
Rank	Athlete	1	2	3	4	5	6	Result	Note
1st place, gold medalist(s)	Tatyana Lebedeva (RUS)	14.80	14.97	15.16	15.18	X	X	15.18 m	SB
2nd place, silver medalist(s)	Françoise Mbango Etone (CMR)	14.77	15.05	14.78	14.85	15.02	X	15.05 m	AR
3rd place, bronze medalist(s)	Magdelín Martínez (ITA)	14.67	14.75	14.66	14.64	14.90	14.86	14.90 m	NR
4	Anna Pyatykh (RUS)	14.64	14.62	14.72	14.70	X	14.64	14.72 m	
5	Mabel Gay (CUB)	X	14.24	14.52	14.38	14.49	X	14.52 m	PB
6	Barbara Lah (ITA)	14.38	X	14.37	14.27	14.34	X	14.38 m	PB
7	Olena Hovorova (UKR)	14.38	14.31	14.18	14.20	14.20	X	14.38 m	
8	Hrysopiyi Devetzi (GRE)	14.34	X	14.21	13.77	X	14.10	14.34 m	PB
9	Adelina Gavrilă (ROM)	14.29	13.73	14.05				14.29 m	
10	Kéné Ndoye (SEN)	13.97	X	14.29				14.29 m	
11	Baya Rahouli (ALG)	12.49	14.26	14.20				14.26 m	
12	Olga Vasdeki (GRE)	13.80	13.96	14.08				14.08 m	
13	Huang Qiuyan (CHN)	13.59	13.98	13.52				13.98 m	
14	Yelena Oleynikova (RUS)	X	13.83	13.92				13.92 m	

== See also ==
- Athletics at the 2003 Pan American Games – Women's triple jump
