= Tatyana Bocharova =

Kazakhstani athletics competitor

Tatyana Bocharova-Konichsheva (born 22 April 1983) is a Kazakhstani long and triple jumper.

She finished sixth at the 2002 World Junior Championships and won the bronze medal at the 2002 Asian Games. She also competed at the 2003 World Championships, the 2004 World Indoor Championships and the 2004 Olympic Games without reaching the finals.

Her personal best jump is 14.07 metres, achieved in July 2003 in Almaty. The Kazakhstani record is currently held by Yelena Parfenova with 14.23 metres.

== Competition record ==
Year	Competition	Venue	Position	Event	Notes
Representing Kazakhstan
1999	World Youth Championships	Bydgoszcz, Poland	24th (q)	Long jump	5.53 m
2000	World Junior Championships	Santiago, Chile	—	Triple jump	NM
2001	Asian Junior Championships	Bandar Seri Begawan, Brunei	1st	Triple jump	13.24 m
2002	World Junior Championships	Kingston, Jamaica	20th (q)	Long jump	5.88 m (wind: -0.8 m/s)
2002	World Junior Championships	Kingston, Jamaica	6th	Triple jump	12.97 m (wind: +0.3 m/s)
2002	Asian Games	Busan, South Korea	3rd	Triple jump	13.26 m
2002	Asian Junior Championships	Bangkok, Thailand	7th	Long jump	5.93 m
2002	Asian Junior Championships	Bangkok, Thailand	3rd	Triple jump	13.32 m
2003	World Championships	Paris, France	28th (q)	Triple jump	13.40 m
2003	Asian Championships	Manila, Philippines	5th	Triple jump	13.50 m
2003	Afro-Asian Games	Hyderabad, India	2nd	Triple jump	13.34 m
2004	World Indoor Championships	Budapest, Hungary	26th (q)	Triple jump	13.24 m
2004	Olympic Games	Athens, Greece	25th (q)	Triple jump	13.81 m
2010	Asian Indoor Championships	Tehran, Iran	5th	Long jump	5.79 m
2010	Asian Indoor Championships	Tehran, Iran	3rd	Triple jump	12.82 m
2010	Asian Games	Guangzhou, China	14th	Long jump	5.53 m
