= Irina Beskrovnaja =

Slovak triple jumper

Irina Beskrovnaja (born 28 December 1982) is a retired Slovak triple jumper.

She finished seventh at the 2003 European U23 Championships. She also competed at the 2006 European Championships and the 2007 European Indoor Championships without reaching the final.

Her personal best jump was 14.07 metres, achieved in July 2006 in Trnava.
