= Athletics at the 2009 Summer Universiade – Women's triple jump =

The women's triple jump event at the 2009 Summer Universiade was held on 9–11 July.

== Medalists ==
Gold	Silver	Bronze
Yarianna Martínez; Cuba	Natalya Kutyakova; Russia	Anastasiya Matveeva; Russia

== Results ==
=== Qualification ===
Qualification: 13.90 m (Q) or at least 12 best (q) qualified for the final.

Rank	Group	Athlete	Nationality	#1	#2	#3	Result	Notes
1	A	Yarianna Martínez	Cuba	13.86	14.24		14.24	Q
2	B	Petia Dacheva	Bulgaria	x	13.86	–	13.86	q
3	A	Anastasiya Matveeva	Russia	13.25	13.54	x	13.54	q
4	B	Sarah Nambawa	Uganda	12.87	x	13.54	13.54	q
5	B	Natalya Kutyakova	Russia	13.50	x	11.91	13.50	q
6	A	Irina Litvinenko	Kazakhstan	13.08w	12.95	13.30	13.30	q
7	B	Thitima Muangjan	Thailand	13.12	13.16	13.21	13.21	q
8	A	Eleonora D'Elicio	Italy	13.19	13.10	13.14	13.19	q
9	A	Elina Sorsa	Finland	x	12.57	13.11	13.11	q
10	A	Eleni Kafourou	Greece	12.99	12.81	12.75	12.99	q
11	B	Francesca Cortellazzo	Italy	12.59	12.98	x	12.98	q
12	A	Thomaida Polydorou	Cyprus	12.05	12.49	12.44	12.49	q
13	B	Lorena Mina	Ecuador	12.27	x	12.49	12.49	
14	A	Māra Grīva	Latvia	12.43	12.20	12.04	12.43	
15	B	Anna Makarova	Estonia	12.38	12.23	12.22	12.38	
16	A	Kadidiatou Loure	Burkina Faso	x	11.47	12.12	12.12	
17	B	Lejla Glodo	Bosnia and Herzegovina	11.77	12.07	11.65	12.07	
18	B	Marsida Dardha	Albania	x	11.93	11.88	11.93	
19	B	Leyla Pashayesa	Azerbaijan	11.73	11.73	11.62	11.73	
20	A	Ivana Petrović	Serbia	x	11.64	11.67	11.67	
	B	Vasiliki Vava	Greece	x	–	–	DNF	
	A	Liu Xiao	China				DNS	

=== Final ===
Rank	Athlete	Nationality	#1	#2	#3	#4	#5	#6	Result	Notes
1st place, gold medalist(s)	Yarianna Martínez	Cuba	14.13w	14.40	14.06	13.93	x	14.16	14.40	SB
2nd place, silver medalist(s)	Natalya Kutyakova	Russia	13.48	14.14	13.99	13.81	13.75	x	14.14	
3rd place, bronze medalist(s)	Anastasiya Matveeva	Russia	13.26	13.49	13.41	13.94w	13.59	13.57	13.94w	
4	Irina Litvinenko	Kazakhstan	13.45	13.64	13.51	13.85	13.80	13.81	13.85	
5	Petia Dacheva	Bulgaria	12.91w	x	13.65	13.67	13.76	13.80	13.80	
6	Sarah Nambawa	Uganda	13.14	13.48	13.28	13.43	13.39w	13.58	13.58	
7	Eleonora D'Elicio	Italy	13.43	13.39	x	13.27	13.52	13.49	13.52	PB
8	Thitima Muangjan	Thailand	13.30	13.44	x	13.17	13.21	13.32	13.44	
9	Eleni Kafourou	Greece	x	13.24w	13.18				13.24w	
10	Francesca Cortellazzo	Italy	x	13.20w	13.09				13.20w	
11	Thomaida Polydorou	Cyprus	12.25	12.35	12.48				12.48	
	Elina Sorsa	Finland							DNS	
