= Zhang Hao (triple jumper) =

Chinese triple jumper (born 1978)

Medal record

Women's athletics

Representing China

Asian Championships
Bronze medal – third place	2003 Manila	Triple jump

Zhang Hao (张灏 Guangxi, 26 February 1978) is a Chinese triple jumper. Her personal best jump is 14.22 metres, achieved in June 2003 in Nanning.

She won the bronze medal at the 2003 Asian Championships. She competed at the 2004 Olympic Games, but without reaching the final round.

== Achievements ==
Year	Competition	Venue	Position	Notes
Representing China
2002	Asian Games	Busan, South Korea	2nd	13.89 m
2003	World Championships	Paris, France	–	NM
2003	Asian Championships	Manila, Philippines	3rd	13.63 m
2003	Afro-Asian Games	Hyderabad, India	4th	12.85 m
2004	Olympic Games	Athens, Greece	32nd (q)	13.30 m
