= 2010 French Athletics Championships =

- Dates: 8–10 July
- Host city: Valence
- Venue: Stade Georges Pompidou
- Events: 38

The 2010 French Athletics Championships was the 122nd edition of the national championship in outdoor track and field for France. It was held on 8–10 July at the Stade Georges Pompidou in Valence. A total of 38 events (divided evenly between the sexes) were contested over the three-day competition. Christophe Lemaitre broke the French record in the men's 100 metres and 200 metres with times of 9.97 seconds and 20.16 seconds, respectively.

== Results ==
=== Men ===
| Event | Gold | | Silver | | Bronze | |
|---|---|---|---|---|---|---|
| 100 metres | Christophe Lemaitre | 9.97 NR | Martial Mbandjock | 10.08 | Ronald Pognon | 10.34 |
| 200 metres | Christophe Lemaitre | 20.16 NR | David Alerte | 20.55 | Pierre-Alexis Pessonneaux | 20.95 |
| 400 metres | Leslie Djhone | 45.45 | Yannick Fonsat | 45.71 | Teddy Venel | 45.92 |
| 800 metres | Hamid Oualich | 1:49.04 | Jeff Lastennet | 1:50.03 | Kamal Saidi | 1:50.25 |
| 1500 metres | Yoann Kowal | 3:45.04 | Florian Carvalho | 3:45.13 | Jamale Aarrass | 3:45.24 |
| 5000 metres | Noureddine Smaïl | 14:07.62 | Yohan Durand | 14:08.07 | Morhad Amdouni | 14:08.55 |
| 10,000 m walk | Yohann Diniz | 40:17.83 | Kévin Campion | 41:14.14 | Bertrand Moulinet | 42:50.45 |
| 110 m hurdles | Dimitri Bascou | 13.42 | Thomas Martinot-Lagarde | 13.56 | Bano Traoré | 13.57 |
| 400 m hurdles | Fadil Bellaabouss | 49.13 | Héni Kechi | 49.65 | Sébastien Maillard | 50.22 |
| 3000 m s'chase | Bouabdellah Tahri | 8:30.46 | Mahiedine Mekhissi-Benabbad | 8:30.53 | Vincent Zouaoui-Dandrieux | 8:37.17 |
| High jump | Mickaël Hanany | 2.25 m | Fabrice Saint-Jean | 2.21 m | Abdoulaye Diarra | 2.21 m |
| Pole vault | Renaud Lavillenie | 5.94 m WL | Damiel Dossévi | 5.75 m | Romain Mesnil | 5.70 m |
| Long jump | Salim Sdiri | 8.28 m | Kafétien Gomis | 8.19 m | Frédéric Erin | 8.10 m |
| Triple jump | Teddy Tamgho | 17.64 m | Benjamin Compaoré | 17.28 m | Jules Lechanga | 16.84 m |
| Shot put | Yves Niaré | 19.90 m | Gaëtan Bucki | 19.39 m | Tumatai Dauphin | 18.73 m |
| Discus throw | Jean-François Aurokiom | 60.09 m | Jean-Claude Retel | 59.00 m | Stéphane Marthely | 57.73 m |
| Hammer throw | Nicolas Figère | 77.24 m | Jérôme Bortoluzzi | 74.19 m | Frédérick Pouzy | 73.90 m |
| Javelin throw | Jérôme Haeffler | 80.37 m | Bérenger Demerval | 74.78 m | Vitolio Tipotio | 74.62 m |
| Decathlon | Florian Geffrouais | 8057 pts | Franck Logel | 7831 pts | Quentin Jammier | 7643 pts |

=== Women ===
| Event | Gold | | Silver | | Bronze | |
|---|---|---|---|---|---|---|
| 100 metres | Véronique Mang | 11.16 | Christine Arron | 11.27 | Myriam Soumaré | 11.32 |
| 200 metres | Lina Jacques-Sébastien | 22.86 | Myriam Soumaré | 23.02 | Nelly Banco | 23.24 |
| 400 metres | Muriel Hurtis-Houairi | 51.82 | Virginie Michanol | 52.92 | Floria Gueï | 53.00 |
| 800 metres | Fanjanteino Félix | 2:03.28 | Linda Marguet | 2:03.68 | Clarisse Moh | 2:05.06 |
| 1500 metres | Fanjanteino Félix | 4:18.71 | Hind Dehiba | 4:18.88 | Latifa Essarokh | 4:20.50 |
| 5000 metres | Karine Pasquier | 16:48.68 | Hélène Guet | 16:52.56 | Patricia Lossouarn | 16:55.10 |
| 10,000 m walk | Christine Guinaudeau | 48:56.81 | Anne-Gaelle Retout | 50:23.41 | Sandra Mitrovic | 50:50.32 |
| 100 m hurdles | Aisseta Diawara | 13.21 | Aurore Ruet | 13.22 | Lucile Berliat | 13.42 |
| 400 m hurdles | Dora Jemaa-Amirouche | 57.50 | Peggy Babin | 58.55 | Aurore Kassambara | 58.82 |
| 3000 m s'chase | Sophie Duarte | 9:52.07 | Hassna Taboussi | 10:28.46 | Anne-Cécile Thévenot | 10:30.22 |
| High jump | Melanie Melfort | 1.86 m | Nina Manga | 1.83 m | Sandrine Champion | 1.80 m |
| Pole vault | Télie Mathiot | 4.35 m | Sandra Ribeiro-Homo | 4.30 m | Maria Ribeiro-Tavares | 4.25 m |
| Long jump | Éloyse Lesueur | 6.71 m | Eunice Barber | 6.60 m | Narayane Dossevi | 6.47 m |
| Triple jump | Nelly Tchayem | 13.76 m | Nathalie Marie-Nely | 13.47 m | Sokhna Galle | 13.43 m |
| Shot put | Laurence Manfredi | 17.91 m | Jessica Cérival | 17.74 m | Myriam Lixfe | 15.46 m |
| Discus throw | Irène Donzelot | 53.89 m | Pauline Pousse | 53.09 m | Christelle Bornil | 52.93 m |
| Hammer throw | Stéphanie Falzon | 73.05 m | Manuela Montebrun | 69.14 m | Amélie Perrin | 67.35 m |
| Javelin throw | Alexia Kogut-Kubiak | 54.76 m | Sephora Bissoly | 50.98 m | Annaelle Fournier | 50.68 m |
| Heptathlon | Marisa De Aniceto | 6009 pts | Yasmina Omrani | 5970 pts | Blandine Maisonnier | 5867 pts |
