= Athanasia Perra =

Greek triple jumper (born 1983)

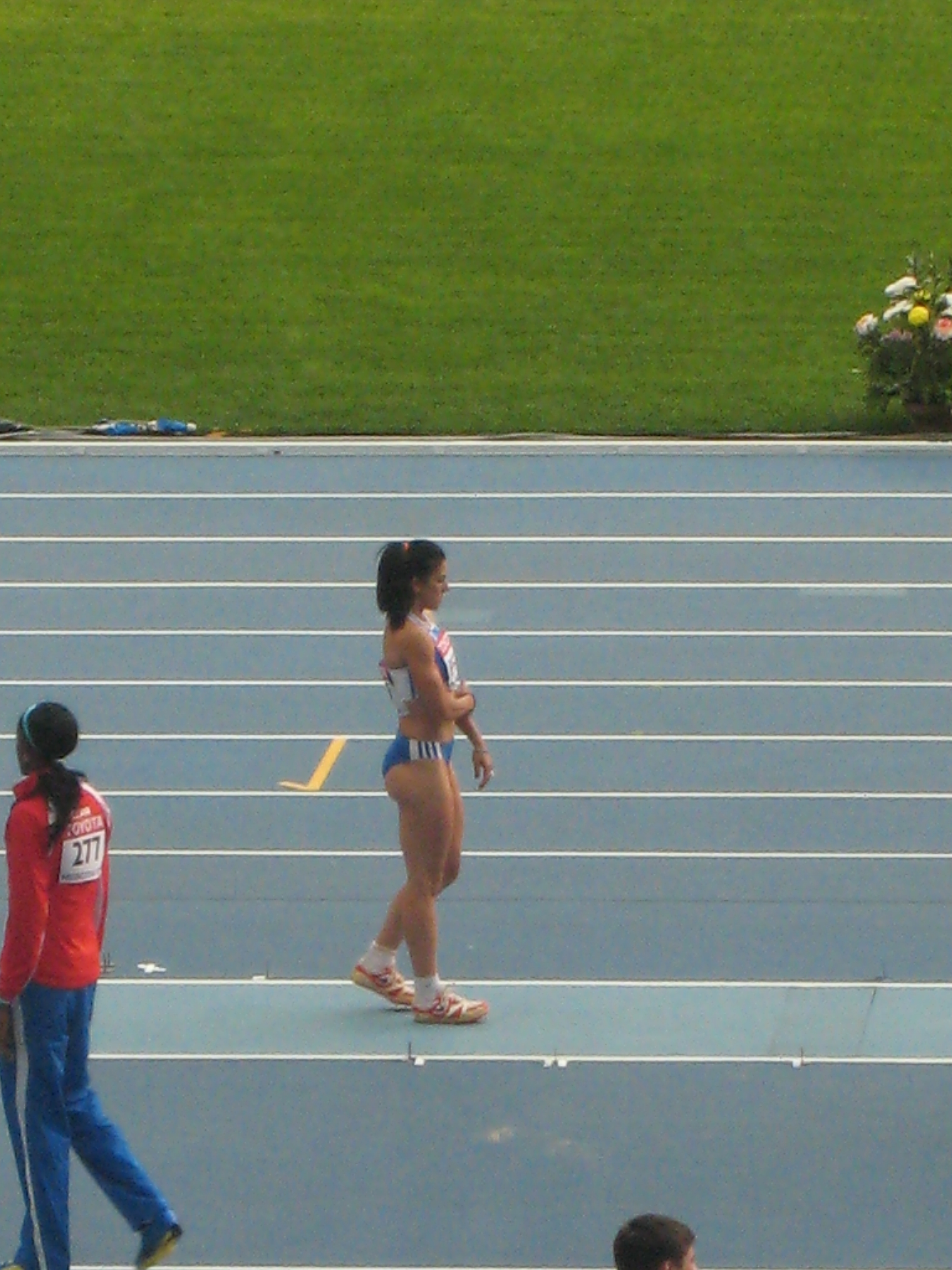
- Athanasia Perra in Moscow 2013.

Personal information
- Born: February 2, 1983 (age 43)
- Height: 1.70 m (5 ft 7 in)
- Weight: 59 kg (130 lb)

Sport
- Country: Greece
- Sport: Athletics
- Event: Triple jump

Achievements and titles
- Personal bests: 14.71 (2012); 14.27 (2005)
Medal record
Mediterranean Games
Gold medal – first place	2009 Pescara	Triple jump
Gold medal – first place	2013 Mersin	Triple jump
- Updated on 15 August 2014

Athanasia Perra (Greek: Αθανασία Πέρρα; born 2 February 1983 in Pyrgos) is a Greek triple jumper.

== Career ==
She finished tenth at the 2002 World Junior Championships. She also competed at the 2004 Olympic Games, the 2005 World Championships, the 2007 World Championships, the 2008 Olympic Games and the 2012 Olympic Games without reaching the final. She did however reach the final of the 2013 World Championships.

She won the gold medal in the Mediterranean Games of Pescara with a personal best jump at 14.62 metres, in July 2009.

In 2017, a retest of her sample from the 2009 World Championships showed presence of an illegal substance and was banned from competition from 4 May 2017 until 3 May 2021. In addition, all of her results between 15 August 2009 and 14 August 2011 were voided.

== International competitions ==
Year	Competition	Venue	Position	Notes
Representing Greece
2001	European Junior Championships	Grosseto, Italy	2nd	13.73 m (w)
2002	World Junior Championships	Kingston, Jamaica	10th	12.62 m (wind: -0.3 m/s)
2004	Olympic Games	Athens, Greece	33rd (q)	13.19 m
2005	European Indoor Championships	Madrid, Spain	12th (q)	13.72 m
2005	European U23 Championships	Erfurt, Germany	3rd	13.94 m (wind: +0.3 m/s)
2005	World Championships	Helsinki, Finland	–	NM
2007	European Indoor Championships	Birmingham, United Kingdom	11th (q)	13.47 m
2007	World Championships	Osaka, Japan	14th (q)	14.15 m
2008	World Indoor Championships	Valencia, Spain	15th (q)	13.61 m
2008	Olympic Games	Beijing, China	–	NM
2009	Mediterranean Games	Pescara, Italy	1st	14.62 m (PB)
2009	World Championships	Berlin, Germany	–	DQ
2010	World Indoor Championships	Doha, Qatar	–	DQ
2010	European Championships	Barcelona, Spain	–	DQ
2011	European Indoor Championships	Paris, France	–	DQ
2012	European Championships	Helsinki, Finland	7th	14.23 m
2012	Olympic Games	London, United Kingdom	33rd (q)	11.93 m
2013	Mediterranean Games	Mersin, Turkey	1st	14.48 m
2013	World Championships	Moscow, Russia	12th	13.75 m
