= 2000 World Junior Championships in Athletics – Women's triple jump =

The women's triple jump event at the 2000 World Junior Championships in Athletics was held in Santiago, Chile, at Estadio Nacional Julio Martínez Prádanos on 20 and 21 October.

== Medalists ==
Gold	Anastasiya Ilyina; Russia
Silver	Anna Pyatykh; Russia
Bronze	Dana Velďáková; Slovakia

== Results ==
=== Final ===
21 October

Rank	Name	Nationality	Attempts						Result	Notes
Rank	Name	Nationality	1	2	3	4	5	6	Result	Notes
1st place, gold medalist(s)	Anastasiya Ilyina	Russia	13.01 (w: +1.1 m/s)	14.24 (w: -0.3 m/s)	13.90 (w: +1.6 m/s)	x	13.69 (w: +0.5 m/s)	13.35 (w: -0.2 m/s)	14.24 (w: -0.3 m/s)	
2nd place, silver medalist(s)	Anna Pyatykh	Russia	14.18 (w: +1.2 m/s)	x	13.84 (w: -0.5 m/s)	13.93 (w: -0.1 m/s)	x	13.85 (w: +0.7 m/s)	14.18 (w: +1.2 m/s)	
3rd place, bronze medalist(s)	Dana Velďáková	Slovakia	13.69 (w: +1.6 m/s)	13.28 (w: +0.4 m/s)	13.92 (w: +1.4 m/s)	13.51 (w: -0.2 m/s)	x	x	13.92 (w: +1.4 m/s)	
4	Mabel Gay	Cuba	13.74 w (w: +3.2 m/s)	13.59 (w: +0.7 m/s)	13.47 (w: 0.0 m/s)	13.35 (w: +0.1 m/s)	x	13.69 (w: -0.4 m/s)	13.74 w (w: +3.2 m/s)	
5	Zhou Yangxia	China	13.72 (w: +1.2 m/s)	13.64 (w: +0.6 m/s)	13.42 (w: -0.2 m/s)	13.53 (w: -0.1 m/s)	x	13.51 (w: +0.4 m/s)	13.72 (w: +1.2 m/s)	
6	Song Ying	China	x	x	13.46 (w: +1.1 m/s)	13.06 (w: +0.1 m/s)	13.41 (w: -0.4 m/s)	13.35 (w: -0.1 m/s)	13.46 (w: +1.1 m/s)	
7	Shelly-Ann Gallimore	Jamaica	x	13.01 (w: +1.1 m/s)	13.25 w (w: +2.3 m/s)	x	12.81 (w: -0.4 m/s)	12.56 (w: +0.3 m/s)	13.25 w (w: +2.3 m/s)	
8	Aurélie Talbot	France	x	x	13.16 (w: +0.8 m/s)	x	-	12.45 (w: +0.6 m/s)	13.16 (w: +0.8 m/s)	
9	Jennifer Arveláez	Venezuela	x	13.01 (w: +1.1 m/s)	12.94 (w: +0.2 m/s)				13.01 (w: +1.1 m/s)	
10	Ancuța Stucan	Romania	x	12.62 (w: -1.2 m/s)	13.00 (w: -0.3 m/s)				13.00 (w: -0.3 m/s)	
11	Keila Costa	Brazil	12.87 (w: +1.7 m/s)	12.97 (w: +0.9 m/s)	12.20 (w: +0.8 m/s)				12.97 (w: +0.9 m/s)	
12	Stéphanie Luzieux	France	12.39 (w: -0.3 m/s)	12.71 (w: +1.0 m/s)	12.51 (w: -0.3 m/s)				12.71 (w: +1.0 m/s)	

=== Qualifications ===
20 October

==== Group A ====
Rank	Name	Nationality	Attempts			Result	Notes
Rank	Name	Nationality	1	2	3	Result	Notes
1	Anastasiya Ilyina	Russia	x	x	14.52 (w: +0.6 m/s)	14.52 (w: +0.6 m/s)	Q
2	Dana Velďáková	Slovakia	x	13.63 (w: +1.0 m/s)	-	13.63 (w: +1.0 m/s)	Q
3	Mabel Gay	Cuba	13.08 (w: NWI)	13.44 (w: +1.1 m/s)	-	13.44 (w: +1.1 m/s)	Q
4	Song Ying	China	13.25 (w: +0.1 m/s)	13.29 (w: -0.6 m/s)	13.33 (w: +0.3 m/s)	13.33 (w: +0.3 m/s)	Q
5	Stéphanie Luzieux	France	12.89 (w: +1.1 m/s)	12.83 (w: +0.1 m/s)	13.02 (w: +0.1 m/s)	13.02 (w: +0.1 m/s)	q
6	Giovanna Franzon	Italy	x	12.84 (w: +0.6 m/s)	x	12.84 (w: +0.6 m/s)	
7	Yevgeniya Stavchanskaya	Ukraine	x	12.83 (w: +0.7 m/s)	x	12.83 (w: +0.7 m/s)	
8	Mariana Bogatie	Romania	x	12.50 (w: -0.5 m/s)	12.79 (w: -0.2 m/s)	12.79 (w: -0.2 m/s)	
9	Patricia Sarrapio	Spain	x	12.65 (w: +0.4 m/s)	12.66 (w: -0.2 m/s)	12.66 (w: -0.2 m/s)	
10	María Spencer	Dominican Republic	12.10 (w: -0.4 m/s)	12.13 (w: -0.9 m/s)	12.47 (w: +0.3 m/s)	12.47 (w: +0.3 m/s)	
11	Katja Demut	Germany	12.46 (w: +0.1 m/s)	x	12.30 (w: -0.7 m/s)	12.46 (w: +0.1 m/s)	
12	Marine Harutyunyan	Armenia	12.13 (w: +0.6 m/s)	12.09 (w: -0.2 m/s)	11.80 (w: +0.3 m/s)	12.13 (w: +0.6 m/s)	
13	Lavada Hill	United States	12.13 (w: -0.5 m/s)	x	x	12.13 (w: -0.5 m/s)	
	Anna Wiberger	Sweden	x	x	x	NM	
	Lo Yu-Hsin	Chinese Taipei	x	x	x	NM	

==== Group B ====
Rank	Name	Nationality	Attempts			Result	Notes
Rank	Name	Nationality	1	2	3	Result	Notes
1	Anna Pyatykh	Russia	14.15 (w: +0.3 m/s)	-	-	14.15 (w: +0.3 m/s)	Q
2	Zhou Yangxia	China	13.51 (w: +0.7 m/s)	-	-	13.51 (w: +0.7 m/s)	Q
3	Ancuța Stucan	Romania	12.89 (w: +0.5 m/s)	x	13.04 (w: -0.3 m/s)	13.04 (w: -0.3 m/s)	q
4	Shelly-Ann Gallimore	Jamaica	12.97 (w: +0.2 m/s)	13.03 (w: +0.8 m/s)	x	13.03 (w: +0.8 m/s)	q
5	Keila Costa	Brazil	12.98 (w: +0.4 m/s)	12.85 (w: -0.5 m/s)	12.73 (w: +1.4 m/s)	12.98 (w: +0.4 m/s)	q
6	Aurélie Talbot	France	x	12.89 (w: -0.7 m/s)	12.95 (w: -0.7 m/s)	12.95 (w: -0.7 m/s)	q
7	Jennifer Arveláez	Venezuela	12.92 (w: +0.4 m/s)	12.57 (w: +0.5 m/s)	x	12.92 (w: +0.4 m/s)	q
8	Jeong Hye-Kyung	South Korea	12.72 (w: +0.7 m/s)	x	x	12.72 (w: +0.7 m/s)	
9	Claudia Ender	Germany	12.33 (w: -0.1 m/s)	x	12.23 (w: -0.1 m/s)	12.33 (w: -0.1 m/s)	
10	Sarah Sydney	Australia	x	12.02 (w: -0.1 m/s)	x	12.02 (w: -0.1 m/s)	
11	Anastasiya Kirbyateva	Uzbekistan	x	x	11.96 (w: +2.0 m/s)	11.96 (w: +2.0 m/s)	
12	Karen Faúndez	Chile	11.56 (w: +0.2 m/s)	11.83 (w: +0.1 m/s)	x	11.83 (w: +0.1 m/s)	
	Yuliya Kolesnikova	Azerbaijan	x	x	x	NM	
	Yusmay Bicet	Cuba	x	-	-	NM	
	Tatyana Bocharova	Kazakhstan	x	x	x	NM	
	Yolanda Thompson	United States	x	x	x	NM	

== Participation ==
According to an unofficial count, 31 athletes from 24 countries participated in the event.

- Armenia (1)
- Australia (1)
- Azerbaijan (1)
- Brazil (1)
- Chile (1)
- China (2)
- Chinese Taipei (1)
- Cuba (2)
- Dominican Republic (1)
- France (2)
- Germany (2)
- Italy (1)
- Jamaica (1)
- Kazakhstan (1)
- Romania (2)
- Russia (2)
- Slovakia (1)
- South Korea (1)
- Spain (1)
- Sweden (1)
- Ukraine (1)
- United States (2)
- Uzbekistan (1)
- Venezuela (1)
