= Amy Zongo =

French triple jumper

Amy Zongo-Filet
Personal information
- Nationality: France
- Born: Amy Zongo; 4 October 1980 (age 45) Marseille

Sport
- Event: Triple Jump

Amy Zongo-Filet, better known by her birthname Amy Zongo, (born October 4, 1980) is a French athlete who specialises in the triple jump. Zongo competed at the 2006 European Athletics Championships, 2002 European Athletics Indoor Championships and the 2009 European Athletics Indoor Championships.

== Prize List ==
- French National Athletic Championships :
  - winner of triple jump in 2001, 2003, 2004, 2005 et 2006
- French Indoors National Athletic Championships :
  - winner of triple jump in 2002

== Competition record ==
Year	Competition	Venue	Position	Event	Notes
Representing France
2001	European U23 Championships	Amsterdam, Netherlands	3rd	Triple jump	13.68 m (wind: 1.2 m/s)
2001	Mediterranean Games	Radès, Tunisia	4th	Triple jump	13.66 m (w)
2002	European Indoor Championships	Vienna, Austria	13th (q)	Triple jump	13.33 m
2003	Universiade	Daegu, South Korea	7th	Triple jump	13.24 m
2005	Mediterranean Games	Almería, Spain	5th	Triple jump	13.79 m
2006	European Championships	Gothenburg, Sweden	15th (q)	Triple jump	13.67 m
2009	European Indoor Championships	Turin, Italy	7th	Triple jump	13.86 m
2009	Mediterranean Games	Pescara, Italy	6th	Triple jump	13.94 m
2009	Jeux de la Francophonie	Beirut, Lebanon	3rd	Triple jump	13.27 m
