= Télie Mathiot =

French pole vaulter

Personal information
- Nationality: French
- Born: 25 May 1987 (age 39) Dijon, France
- Height: 1.68 m (5 ft 6 in)
- Weight: 60 kg (132 lb)

Sport
- Sport: Athletics
- Event: Pole Vault
- Club: Entente Sud Lyonnais
- Coached by: Christian Bourguignon

Télie Mathiot (born 25 May 1987 at Dijon) is a French athlete who specializes in pole vaulting.

== Career ==
In 2010, Télie Mathiot became French Pole Vault Champion at the 122nd French championships at Valence. After beating her personal best by vaulting 4.41 m at Saran on 3 June 2011 in the championships of France FFSU, she then competed at the European Team Championships at Stockholm where she finished 8th with a vault of 4.25 m.

== Prize list ==
Date	Competition	Location	Result	Performance
2009	Francophone Games	Beirut	1st	4.35 m
2010	France Championships	Valence	1st	4.35 m
2011	European Team Championships	Stockholm	8th	4.25 m

== Records ==
- 4.41 m outdoors at Saran on 4 June 2011.
- 4.34 m indoors at Cassis on 26 March 2011.
