= 1998 World Junior Championships in Athletics – Women's triple jump =

The women's triple jump event at the 1998 World Junior Championships in Athletics was held in Annecy, France, at Parc des Sports on 1 and 2 August.

== Medalists ==
Gold	Baya Rahouli; Algeria
Silver	Mariana Solomon; Romania
Bronze	Marija Martinović; Yugoslavia

== Results ==
=== Final ===
2 August

Rank	Name	Nationality	Attempts						Result	Notes
Rank	Name	Nationality	1	2	3	4	5	6	Result	Notes
1st place, gold medalist(s)	Baya Rahouli	Algeria	13.45 (w: -1.1 m/s)	13.46 (w: -0.4 m/s)	13.74 (w: -0.1 m/s)	13.65 (w: -0.6 m/s)	14.04 (w: -0.3 m/s)	x	14.04 (w: -0.3 m/s)	
2nd place, silver medalist(s)	Mariana Solomon	Romania	13.65 (w: -0.9 m/s)	13.44 (w: -0.3 m/s)	x	13.48 (w: +0.6 m/s)	13.75 (w: +0.3 m/s)	11.83 (w: -0.1 m/s)	13.75 (w: +0.3 m/s)	
3rd place, bronze medalist(s)	Marija Martinović	Yugoslavia	13.15 (w: -1.0 m/s)	13.05 (w: -0.7 m/s)	13.29 (w: -0.5 m/s)	13.47 (w: +0.4 m/s)	13.36 (w: -0.1 m/s)	13.15 (w: +0.1 m/s)	13.47 (w: +0.4 m/s)	
4	Yevgeniya Stavchanskaya	Ukraine	13.28 (w: -0.8 m/s)	x	11.88 (w: -0.2 m/s)	x	x	13.41 (w: +0.6 m/s)	13.41 (w: +0.6 m/s)	
5	Mariana Bogatie	Romania	13.17 (w: -0.4 m/s)	12.76 (w: -1.3 m/s)	x	12.92 (w: -0.4 m/s)	x	12.80 (w: +1.2 m/s)	13.17 (w: -0.4 m/s)	
6	Dana Velďáková	Slovakia	12.83 (w: -1.2 m/s)	12.97 (w: -0.2 m/s)	13.12 (w: +0.9 m/s)	12.90 (w: -1.6 m/s)	11.19 (w: +0.5 m/s)	x	13.12 (w: +0.9 m/s)	
7	Viktoriya Brigadnaya	Turkmenistan	13.08 (w: -1.1 m/s)	12.96 (w: -1.3 m/s)	12.79 (w: 0.0 m/s)	12.82 (w: +0.5 m/s)	13.02 (w: +0.8 m/s)	x	13.08 (w: -1.1 m/s)	
8	Galina Sharova	Russia	13.05 (w: -0.8 m/s)	x	12.96 (w: -1.1 m/s)	12.54 (w: -0.2 m/s)	x	12.90 (w: -0.6 m/s)	13.05 (w: -0.8 m/s)	
9	Anna Tarasova	Kazakhstan	12.95 (w: -1.5 m/s)	12.89 (w: -1.1 m/s)	12.92 (w: +0.4 m/s)				12.95 (w: -1.5 m/s)	
10	Li Jing	China	12.85 (w: -0.3 m/s)	x	12.88 (w: +0.3 m/s)				12.88 (w: +0.3 m/s)	
11	Peng Fengmei	China	12.73 (w: -0.6 m/s)	x	x				12.73 (w: -0.6 m/s)	
12	Yakelin Iglesias	Cuba	12.62 (w: -1.2 m/s)	12.58 (w: -0.4 m/s)	12.70 (w: -0.5 m/s)				12.70 (w: -0.5 m/s)	

=== Qualifications ===
1 Aug

==== Group A ====
Rank	Name	Nationality	Attempts			Result	Notes
Rank	Name	Nationality	1	2	3	Result	Notes
1	Mariana Solomon	Romania	13.09 (w: +0.6 m/s)	12.96 (w: -1.7 m/s)	x	13.09 (w: +0.6 m/s)	q
2	Anna Tarasova	Kazakhstan	13.01 (w: -1.2 m/s)	13.02 (w: +0.5 m/s)	13.08 (w: -0.7 m/s)	13.08 (w: -0.7 m/s)	q
3	Dana Velďáková	Slovakia	13.05 (w: -1.1 m/s)	12.67 (w: -1.5 m/s)	12.83 (w: 0.0 m/s)	13.05 (w: -1.1 m/s)	q
4	Li Jing	China	13.04 (w: -0.3 m/s)	x	12.59 (w: +0.1 m/s)	13.04 (w: -0.3 m/s)	q
5	Yevgeniya Stavchanskaya	Ukraine	12.91 (w: -2.2 m/s)	12.96 (w: -0.3 m/s)	12.78 (w: -0.4 m/s)	12.96 (w: -0.3 m/s)	q
6	Silvia Otto	Germany	12.84 (w: -0.7 m/s)	x	12.46 (w: -0.4 m/s)	12.84 (w: -0.7 m/s)	
7	Yasmina Soualhia	France	12.42 (w: +0.4 m/s)	12.74 (w: -1.8 m/s)	x	12.74 (w: -1.8 m/s)	
8	Shelly-Ann Gallimore	Jamaica	x	12.40 (w: -1.5 m/s)	12.33 (w: +0.2 m/s)	12.40 (w: -1.5 m/s)	
9	Laura Tosoni	Italy	12.38 (w: -0.4 m/s)	x	x	12.38 (w: -0.4 m/s)	
10	Tatyana Hovhannisyan	Armenia	11.79 (w: -0.2 m/s)	11.94 (w: +0.7 m/s)	11.93 (w: -0.5 m/s)	11.94 (w: +0.7 m/s)	

==== Group B ====
Rank	Name	Nationality	Attempts			Result	Notes
Rank	Name	Nationality	1	2	3	Result	Notes
1	Baya Rahouli	Algeria	13.90 (w: +1.6 m/s)	-	-	13.90 (w: +1.6 m/s)	Q
2	Marija Martinović	Yugoslavia	12.60 (w: -0.7 m/s)	13.45 (w: -0.2 m/s)	-	13.45 (w: -0.2 m/s)	Q
3	Galina Sharova	Russia	12.97 (w: -0.2 m/s)	13.19 (w: +1.0 m/s)	11.72 (w: -0.3 m/s)	13.19 (w: +1.0 m/s)	q
4	Viktoriya Brigadnaya	Turkmenistan	12.95 (w: -0.9 m/s)	12.62 (w: -0.3 m/s)	13.01 (w: -0.2 m/s)	13.01 (w: -0.2 m/s)	q
5	Peng Fengmei	China	12.99 (w: -0.8 m/s)	12.39 (w: -0.9 m/s)	12.73 (w: -0.5 m/s)	12.99 (w: -0.8 m/s)	q
6	Yakelin Iglesias	Cuba	12.72 (w: -1.1 m/s)	12.91 (w: 0.0 m/s)	12.91 (w: -0.4 m/s)	12.91 (w: 0.0 m/s)	q
7	Mariana Bogatie	Romania	11.32 (w: -0.5 m/s)	12.32 (w: -1.2 m/s)	12.85 (w: -1.7 m/s)	12.85 (w: -1.7 m/s)	q
8	Christine Brown	Jamaica	12.26 (w: -0.2 m/s)	12.62 (w: -0.9 m/s)	x	12.62 (w: -0.9 m/s)	
9	Stéphanie Luzieux	France	12.28 (w: -1.0 m/s)	12.54 (w: +0.2 m/s)	12.52 (w: -0.1 m/s)	12.54 (w: +0.2 m/s)	
10	Olga Galen	Estonia	11.98 (w: -0.5 m/s)	12.26 (w: +0.4 m/s)	12.32 (w: -0.4 m/s)	12.32 (w: -0.4 m/s)	
11	Anja Diezel	Germany	12.26 (w: +1.5 m/s)	x	x	12.26 (w: +1.5 m/s)	

== Participation ==
According to an unofficial count, 21 athletes from 16 countries participated in the event.

- Algeria (1)
- Armenia (1)
- China (2)
- Cuba (1)
- Estonia (1)
- France (2)
- Germany (2)
- Italy (1)
- Jamaica (2)
- Kazakhstan (1)
- Romania (2)
- Russia (1)
- Slovakia (1)
- Turkmenistan (1)
- Ukraine (1)
- Yugoslavia (1)
