= Yusmay Bicet =

Cuban triple jumper (born 1983)

Personal information
- Born: 11 December 1983 (age 42)

Sport
- Sport: Track and field
Medal record
Representing Cuba
Pan American Games
Bronze medal – third place	2003 Santo Domingo	Triple jump
World Youth Championships
Bronze medal – third place	1999 Bydgoszcz	Triple jump

Yusmay Bicet Planas (born 1 December 1983) is a Cuban triple jumper.

Her personal best jump is 14.61 metres, achieved in March 2004 in Havana, Cuba .

== Achievements ==
Year	Competition	Venue	Position	Notes
Representing Cuba
1999	World Youth Championships	Bydgoszcz, Poland	3rd	13.58 m
2000	World Junior Championships	Santiago, Chile	—	NM
2001	Central American and Caribbean Championships	Guatemala City, Guatemala	3rd	13.62 m
2003	Pan American Games	Santo Domingo, Dominican Republic	3rd	13.90 m
2003	World Championships	Paris, France	16th (q)	14.06 m
2004	Ibero-American Championships	Huelva, Spain	1st	14.51 m
2004	Olympic Games	Athens, Greece	9th	14.57 m
