= Nadezhda Alekhina =

Russian triple jumper (born 1978)

Nadezhda Alekhina, née Bazhenova (Russian: Надежда Алехина; born 22 September 1978) is a Russian triple jumper.

She finished fourth at the 2002 European Athletics Indoor Championships and won the bronze medal at the 2005 Summer Universiade. She also competed at the World Championships in 2003, 2005 and 2009 without reaching the finals. In the long jump she finished seventh at the 2001 Summer Universiade.

Her personal best jump is 15.14 metres, achieved in July 2009 in Cheboksary. The Russian record is currently held by Tatyana Lebedeva with 15.34 metres. Alekhina also has 6.56 metres in the long jump, achieved in June 2003 in Tula.

== International competitions ==
Representing Russia
Year	Competition	Venue	Position	Event	Result	Notes
2001	Universiade	Beijing, China	7th	Long jump	6.39 m	
2002	European Indoor Championships	Vienna, Austria	4th	Triple jump	14.20 m	
2003	World Championships	Paris, France	23rd (q)	Triple jump	13.77 m	
2005	World Championships	Helsinki, Finland	20th (q)	Triple jump	13.78 m	
2005	Universiade	İzmir, Turkey	3rd	Triple jump	13.90 m	
2009	World Championships	Berlin, Germany	28th (q)	Triple jump	13.60 m	
2010	European Championships	Barcelona, Spain	4th	Triple jump	14.45 m	

== National titles ==
- Russian Athletics Championships
  - Triple jump: 2003, 2005, 2009, 2010
- Russian Indoor Athletics Championships
  - Triple jump: 2002
