= Viktoriya Valyukevich =

Russian triple jumper (born 1982)

Personal information
- Born: 22 May 1982 (age 44) Sochi, Soviet Union
- Height: 1.78 m (5 ft 10 in)
- Weight: 62 kg (137 lb)

Sport
- Country: Russia
- Sport: Athletics
- Event: Triple jump
- Updated on 15 August 2012

Viktoriya Gurova-Valyukevich (Russian: Виктория Валюкевич, née Гурова, Gurova; born 22 May 1982) is a Russian triple jumper.

== Career ==
She won the silver medal at the 2003 Summer Universiade, the gold medal at the 2005 European Indoor Championships and finished tenth at the 2005 World Championships. She also competed at the 2004 Olympic Games without reaching the finals. In 2008, she reached the Olympic final, finishing in 7th. At the 2012 Summer Olympics she reached the final of the triple jump, finishing in 8th position. On 30 March 2017, she was disqualified, and her 2012 Olympics results were annulled, after her second probe came positive for banned substances.

Her personal best jump is 14.85 metres, achieved in July 2008 in Kazan. The Russian record is currently held by Tatyana Lebedeva with 15.34 metres.

She is married to Slovak triple jumper Dmitrij Vaľukevič.

== Achievements ==
Year	Competition	Venue	Position	Notes
Representing Russia
2001	European Junior Championships	Grosseto, Italy	3rd	13.68 m
2003	European U23 Championships	Bydgoszcz, Poland	1st	14.37 m (wind: 1.4 m/s)
2003	Universiade	Daegu, South Korea	2nd	14.14 m
2004	Olympic Games	Athens, Greece	21st (q)	14.04 m
2005	European Indoor Championships	Madrid, Spain	1st	14.74 m
2005	World Championships	Helsinki, Finland	10th	13.96 m
2008	Olympic Games	Beijing, China	7th	14.77 m
2012	World Indoor Championships	Istanbul, Turkey	10th (q)	14.00 m
2012	Olympic Games	London, Great Britain	DQ	14.24 m
