= Petia Dacheva =

Bulgarian triple jumper

Petia Dacheva (Bulgarian: Петя Дачева) (born March 10, 1985) is a Bulgarian triple jumper.

== Competition record ==
Year	Competition	Venue	Position	Event	Notes
Representing Bulgaria
2007	European U23 Championships	Debrecen, Hungary	13th (q)	Triple jump	13.01 m (wind: 0.4 m/s)
2009	Universiade	Belgrade, Serbia	5th	Triple jump	13.80 m
2009	World Championships	Berlin, Germany	14th (q)	Triple jump	14.11 m
2010	World Indoor Championships	Doha, Qatar	12th (q)	Triple jump	13.65 m
2010	European Championships	Barcelona, Spain	— (q)	Triple jump	NM
2011	European Indoor Championships	Paris, France	8th	Triple jump	13.84 m
2012	World Indoor Championships	Istanbul, Turkey	20th (q)	Triple jump	13.65 m
