= Huang Qiuyan =

Chinese triple jumper (born 1980)

Medal record

Women's athletics

Representing China

Asian Championships
Gold medal – first place	2003 Manila	Triple jump
Bronze medal – third place	2005 Incheon	Triple jump

Huang Qiuyan (simplified Chinese: 黄秋艳; traditional Chinese: 黃秋艷; pinyin: Huáng Qiūyàn; born January 5, 1980) is a Chinese triple jumper.

With 14.72 metres Huang is a former Asian record holder in triple jump. The result was achieved in Guangzhou on 22 November 2001.

== Achievements ==
Year	Competition	Venue	Position	Notes
Representing China
2002	Asian Games	Busan, South Korea	1st	14.28 m
2003	World Indoor Championships	Birmingham, United Kingdom	16th (q)	13.23 m
2003	World Championships	Paris, France	13th	13.98 m
2003	Asian Championships	Manila, Philippines	1st	14.39 m
2003	Afro-Asian Games	Hyderabad, India	1st	13.50 m
2004	World Indoor Championships	Budapest, Hungary	14th (q)	14.24 m
2004	Olympic Games	Athens, Greece	12th	14.33 m
2005	World Championships	Helsinki, Finland	9th	14.21 m
2005	Asian Championships	Incheon, South Korea	3rd	13.75 m
2005	East Asian Games	Macau, China	1st	14.08 m
