= Yekaterina Puzanova =

Russian middle-distance runner

Yekaterina Puzanova (born 1 January 1979) is a Russian middle distance runner.

She won the 1500 metres at the 2002 European Indoor Athletics Championships in Vienna. At the 2003 IAAF World Indoor Championships she finished sixth in 800 metres, but was tested positive for Norandrosterone and Androstenedione and disqualified.

Because of this doping offence she was suspended by the IAAF from May 2003 to May 2005. She has not competed at the elite level since.
