= Yarianna Martínez =

Cuban triple jumper

Personal information
- Full name: Yarianna Martínez Iglesias
- Born: 20 September 1984 (age 42) San Luis, Pinar del Río, Cuba
- Height: 1.67 m (5 ft 6 in)
- Weight: 58 kg (128 lb)

Sport
- Country: Cuba
- Sport: Athletics
Medal record
Athletics
Representing Cuba
CAC Junior Championships (U20)
Silver medal – second place	2002 Bridgetown	Triple jump
- Updated on 27 January 2015

Yarianna Martínez Iglesias (born 20 September 1984) is a Cuban triple jumper. Her personal best jump is 14.42 metres (47.3 ft), achieved in February 2011 in Havana.

== Career ==
She won the silver medal at the 2002 World Junior Championships, the gold medal at the 2005 Central American and Caribbean Championships and the bronze medal at the 2007 Universiade. She also competed at the 2007 World Championships and the 2008 Olympic Games without reaching the final.

== Personal bests ==
- Long jump: 6.07 m (wind: -1.0 m/s) – Havana, Cuba, 28 May 2003
- Triple jump: 14.42 m (wind: +1.2 m/s) – Havana, Cuba, 18 February 2011

== Achievements ==
Year	Competition	Venue	Position	Event	Notes
Representing Cuba
2002	Central American and Caribbean Junior Championships (U-20)	Bridgetown, Barbados	2nd	Triple jump	13.43m (-2.2 m/s)
2002	World Junior Championships	Kingston, Jamaica	2nd	Triple jump	13.74 m (+0.4 m/s)
2005	ALBA Games	Havana, Cuba	1st	Triple jump	13.80 m w
2005	Central American and Caribbean Championships	Nassau, Bahamas	1st	Triple jump	14.18 m
2006	NACAC Under-23 Championships	Santo Domingo, Dominican Republic	1st	Triple jump	14.28 m (+0.3 m/s)
2007	Universiade	Bangkok, Thailand	3rd	Triple jump	14.25 m (+0.9 m/s)
2007	World Championships	Osaka, Japan	16th (q)	Triple jump	14.01 m (+0.0 m/s)
2008	Central American and Caribbean Championships	Cali, Colombia	2nd	Triple jump	13.95 m (+0.0 m/s)
2008	Olympic Games	Beijing, China	21st (q)	Triple jump	13.96 m (+0.0 m/s)
2009	ALBA Games	Havana, Cuba	3rd	Triple jump	14.34 m (+3.3 m/s)
2009	Universiade	Belgrade, Serbia	1st	Triple jump	14.40 m (+0.8 m/s)
2011	ALBA Games	Barquisimeto, Venezuela	1st	Triple jump	14.19 m (-0.8 m/s)
2011	ALBA Games	Barquisimeto, Venezuela	1st	4 × 100 m relay	45.33 s
2011	World Championships	Daegu, South Korea	13th (q)	Triple jump	14.07 m (-0.1 m/s)
2014	World Indoor Championships	Sopot, Poland	7th	Triple jump	13.99 m
2014	Pan American Sports Festival	Mexico City, Mexico	2nd	Triple jump	14.29m A (wind: -0.5 m/s)
