= Tetyana Shchurenko =

Ukrainian triple jumper

Personal information
- Full name: Tetyana Shchurenko
- Nationality: Ukraine
- Born: 26 February 1976 (age 50) Dnipropetrovsk, Ukrainian; SSR, Soviet Union
- Height: 1.82 m (5 ft 11 1/2 in)
- Weight: 63 kg (139 lb)

Sport
- Sport: Athletics
- Event: Triple jump
- Club: Ukraïna Kyiv

Achievements and titles
- Personal best: Triple jump: 14.22 (2004)

Tetyana Shchurenko (Ukrainian: Тетяна Щуренко; born 26 February 1976, in Dnipropetrovsk) is a retired Ukrainian triple jumper. She represented her nation Ukraine in the triple jump at the 2004 Summer Olympics, and also set a personal best of 14.22 metres from the national athletics meet in Kyiv.

Shchurenko qualified for the Ukrainian squad, along with teammate Olena Hovorova, in the women's triple jump at the 2004 Summer Olympics in Athens. Two months before the Games, she jumped 14.22 metres to register her own personal best and an Olympic A-standard at the national athletics meet in Kyiv. During the prelims, Shchurenko got off to a rough start with an immediate foul, but spanned a mediocre 13.55-metre leap on her third attempt to secure a thirtieth spot from a roster of thirty-three athletes, failing to advance further to the final round.
