= Tiombe Hurd =

American triple jumper

Personal information
- Born: August 17, 1973 (age 52) Seattle, Washington, United States

Sport
- Sport: Track and field
Medal record
Representing United States
World Indoor Championships
Bronze medal – third place	2001 Lisbon	Triple jump

Tiombe Hurd (born August 17, 1973) is an American triple jumper. After winning the 2004 US Olympic Trials, she represented her native country at the 2004 Olympic Games in Athens, Greece, where she didn't reach the final. Her personal best jump is 14.45 metres, achieved in July 2004 in Sacramento. This was the American record at the time.

Competed in the 2010 US Masters National Outdoor Championship, and winning the TJ with a Masters American Record mark.

She was a member of the James Madison Dukes track and field program, where she qualified for five NCAA Division I Women's Outdoor Track and Field Championships and NCAA Division I Women's Indoor Track and Field Championships from 1993 to 1995.

== Competition record ==
Year	Competition	Venue	Position	Event	Notes
Representing United States
1995	Universiade	Fukuoka, Japan	8th	Triple jump	12.95 m
1998	Goodwill Games	Uniondale, United States	3rd	Triple jump	13.63 m
1999	Pan American Games	Winnipeg, Canada	5th	Triple jump	13.69 m
2001	World Indoor Championships	Lisbon, Portugal	3rd	Triple jump	14.19 m
2001	World Championships	Edmonton, Canada	13th (q)	Triple jump	13.96 m
2001	Goodwill Games	Brisbane, Australia	6th	Triple jump	13.40 m
2003	Pan American Games	Santo Domingo, Dominican Republic	5th	Triple jump	13.68 m
2004	Olympic Games	Athens, Greece	22nd (q)	Triple jump	13.98 m
2007	NACAC Championships	San Salvador, El Salvador	5th	Triple jump	13.22 m
