= Mariana Solomon =

Romanian triple jumper (born 1980)

Mariana Solomon (born 8 September 1980 in Nehoiu) is a Romanian triple jumper.

Her personal best jump is 14.42 metres, achieved at the 2004 Olympic Games in Athens (this was not enough to progress from the qualifying round). The result places her fifth on the all-time Romanian performers list, behind Rodica Mateescu, Adelina Gavrilă, Cristina Nicolau and Mihaela Gândila.

== Achievements ==
Year	Competition	Venue	Position	Notes
Representing Romania
1998	World Junior Championships	Annecy, France	2nd	13.75 m (wind: +0.3 m/s) PB
2001	European U23 Championships	Amsterdam, Netherlands	15th (q)	12.26 m (wind: 0.5 m/s)
2003	Universiade	Daegu, South Korea	3rd	14.09 m PB
