= Svetlana Bolshakova =

Russian-born triple jumper of

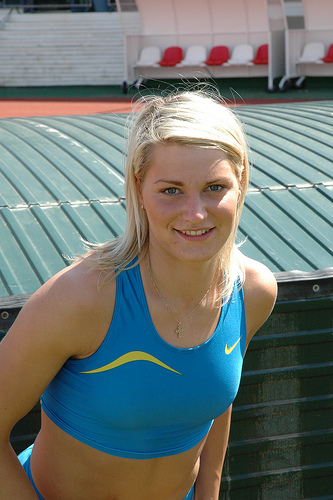

Personal information
- Born: October 14, 1984 (age 41)
- Height: 1.78 m (5 ft 10 in)
- Weight: 68 kg (150 lb)
Medal record
Representing Belgium
Women's athletics
European Championships
Bronze medal – third place	2010 Barcelona	Triple jump

Svetlana Bolshakova (Russian: Светлана Большакова; born 14 October 1984) is a Russian-born triple jumper of who competes for Belgium internationally. She married Belgian high jumper Stijn Stroobants in August 2006 and acquired the Belgian nationality in July 2008.

Bolshakova was born in Leningrad and represented Russia until 13 November 2008. As a teenager she won the silver medal at the 2001 World Youth Championships and the bronze medal at the 2003 European Junior Championships. Her personal best as a junior was 13.55 metres, achieved in June 2002 in Kazan. She had 13.64 on the indoor track, achieved in February 2003 in Moscow.

She competed at the 2009 World Championships, without reaching the final. She has a 14.28 metres personal best on the indoor track, achieved in February 2007 in Düsseldorf. In July 2010, she reached the finals of the 2010 European Athletics Championships in Barcelona, where she won the bronze medal by improving her personal best and national record of 14.53 metres, which she achieved earlier that year in June at Budapest, to 14.55 metres and setting a new Belgian record for triple jump.

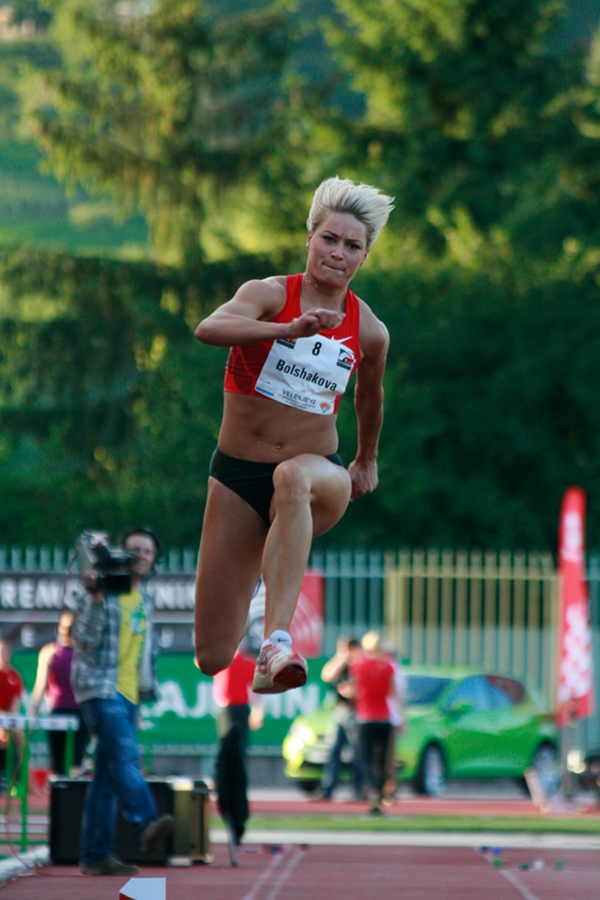
Svetlana Bolshakova, Velenje, Slovenia June 2012

She improved the Belgian indoor record of 14.31 m to win on home turf at the Indoor Flanders Meeting.
