= Alina Popescu =

Romanian triple jumper

Personal information
- Born: 27 October 1985 (age 40)

Sport
- Country: Romania
- Sport: Athletics
- Event: Triple jump

Achievements and titles
- Personal best: Triple jump: 13.93 m (2007)

Alina Popescu (born 27 October 1985) is a Romanian female triple jumper, who won an individual gold medal at the Youth World Championships.
