= Olesya Zabara =

Russian triple jumper

Olesya Aleksandrovna Zabara (née Bufalova) (Russian: Олеся Александровна Забара; born 6 October 1982) is a Russian triple jumper.

She finished fifth at the 2006 European Athletics Championships and second (14.50 metres, indoor personal best) at the 2007 European Indoor Championships. She finished tenth at the 2007 World Championships.

In 2008, she improved her personal indoor best to 14.54 metres in Tula. She finished seventh at the 2008 World Indoor Championships.
