= Nelly Tchayem =

French triple jumper

Personal information
- Nationality: France
- Born: 4 August 1983 (age 42) Lille
- Height: 1.75 m (5 ft 9 in)

Sport
- Event: Triple jump

Nelly Tchayem (born 4 August 1983 in Lille) is a French athlete specializing in the triple jump.

== Biography ==
She won two French Athletics Championships titles in the triple jump: one outdoors in 2010 and one indoors in 2003.

Tchayem was convinced to join the UTEP Miners track and field team by her friend Mickaël Hanany, who she had known since she was 14 years old. She became an All-American for the team, placing 3rd in the triple jump at the 2008 NCAA Division I Outdoor Track and Field Championships.

=== National championships ===
- French Athletics Championships:
  - Triple jump: 2010
- French Indoor Athletics Championships:
  - Triple jump: 2003

=== Records ===
Personal records
| Event | Performance | Location | Date |
|---|---|---|---|
| Triple jump | 13.90 m | Walnut | 16 April 2011 |
