= Natallia Safronava =

Belarusian triple jumper

Personal information
- Born: 11 April 1974 (age 52) Brest, Soviet Union

Sport
- Sport: Track and field
Medal record
Representing Belarus
Summer Universiade
| Silver medal – second place | 2001 Beijing | Triple jump |

Natallia Ivanauna Safronava (Belarusian: Натальля Сафронава), née Klimovets (born 11 April 1974) is a Belarusian triple jumper.

Her personal best jump is 14.65 metres, achieved in June 2000 in Minsk. She was at the Olympics that year and again in 2004 competing in the triple jump. She has 6.66 metres in the long jump, achieved in July 2006 in Brest.

== Achievements ==
| Year | Competition | Venue | Position | Notes |
Representing Belarus
| 1994 | European Championships | Helsinki, Finland | 15th (q) | 13.37 m (wind: +1.7 m/s) |
| 2001 | World Championships | Edmonton, Canada | 12th | 13.82 m |
| 2001 | Universiade | Beijing, China | 2nd | 14.57 m |
| 2004 | World Indoor Championships | Budapest, Hungary | 12th | 14.00 m |
| 2004 | Olympic Games | Athens, Greece | 13th | 14.22 m |
| 2006 | European Championships | Gothenburg, Sweden | 8th | 14.13 m |
| 2006 | World Athletics Final | Stuttgart, Germany | 7th | 13.88 m |
| 2007 | European Indoor Championships | Birmingham, England | 8th | 13.82 m |
