= 2000 European Athletics Indoor Championships – Women's long jump =

The women's long jump event at the 2000 European Athletics Indoor Championships was held on February 26–27.

== Medalists ==
Gold	Silver	Bronze
Erica Johansson; Sweden	Heike Drechsler; Germany	Iva Prandzheva; Bulgaria

== Results ==
=== Qualification ===
Qualifying perf. 6.65 (Q) or 8 best performers (q) advanced to the Final.

Rank	Athlete	Nationality	#1	#2	#3	Result	Note
1	Erica Johansson	Sweden	6.61	6.80		6.80	Q, NR
2	Iva Prandzheva	Bulgaria	6.52	6.67		6.67	Q
3	Olena Shekhovtsova	Ukraine	X	6.55	6.66	6.66	Q
4	Heike Drechsler	Germany	6.60	6.65		6.65	Q
5	Olga Rublyova	Russia	6.49	6.47	6.62	6.62	q
6	Niki Xanthou	Greece	6.57	X	X	6.57	q
7	Tatyana Ter-Mesrobyan	Russia	6.37	6.49	X	6.49	q
8	Tünde Vaszi	Hungary	6.34	6.47	6.43	6.47	q
9	Viktoriya Vershinina	Ukraine	6.23	X	6.45	6.45	
10	Marcela Umnik	Slovenia	6.44	X	6.21	6.44	
11	Valentīna Gotovska	Latvia	6.38	6.19	6.42	6.42	
12	Zita Ajkler	Hungary	6.29	6.10	6.17	6.29	
13	Jade Johnson	Great Britain	5.72	6.18	X	6.18	
14	Sofia Schulte	Germany	6.15	6.17	X	6.17	
15	Sandrine Hennart	Belgium	6.13	X	6.11	6.13	
16	Concepción Montaner	Spain	6.11	6.06	5.91	6.11	
17	Adrija Grocienė	Lithuania	5.86	5.91	X	5.91	
18	Annelies de Meester	Belgium	5.75	X	X	5.75	
	Camilla Johansson	Sweden	X	X	X	NM	

=== Final ===
Rank	Athlete	Nationality	#1	#2	#3	#4	#5	#6	Result	Note
1st place, gold medalist(s)	Erica Johansson	Sweden	6.89	6.73	X	X	6.66	X	6.89	NR
2nd place, silver medalist(s)	Heike Drechsler	Germany	6.80	X	3.44	X	X	6.86	6.86	SB
3rd place, bronze medalist(s)	Iva Prandzheva	Bulgaria	X	6.70	6.74	6.56	6.80	6.59	6.80	
4	Olga Rublyova	Russia	6.55	6.67	X	6.59	6.57	6.40	6.67	
5	Tünde Vaszi	Hungary	6.58	6.46	x	6.49	6.29	X	6.58	
6	Tatyana Ter-Mesrobyan	Russia	X	X	6.49	6.50	X	6.57	6.57	
7	Olena Shekhovtsova	Ukraine	6.56	6.34	X	4.45	6.31	6.47	6.56	
8	Niki Xanthou	Greece	X	6.51	X	6.51	X	X	6.51	
