= Athletics at the 2001 Summer Universiade – Women's long jump =

The women's long jump event at the 2001 Summer Universiade was held at the Workers Stadium in Beijing, China on 27 and 28 August.

== Medalists ==
Gold	Silver	Bronze
Maurren Maggi; Brazil	Guan Yingnan; China	Kumiko Ikeda; Japan

== Results ==
=== Qualification ===
Rank	Group	Athlete	Nationality	Result	Notes
1	B	Guan Yingnan	China	6.51	
2	B	Maurren Maggi	Brazil	6.39	
3	A	Lucie Komrsková	Czech Republic	6.30	
4	A	Anastasiya Ilyina	Russia	6.29	
5	B	Nadezhda Bazhenova	Russia	6.27	
6	A	Zita Ajkler	Hungary	6.24	
7	B	Stiliani Pilatou	Greece	6.22	
8	B	Nicole Herschmann	Germany	6.18	
9	B	Elisha Williams	United States	6.09	
10	A	Tina Čarman	Slovenia	6.05	
11	A	Kumiko Ikeda	Japan	6.00	
11	B	Aurélie Felix	France	6.00	
13	A	Akiba McKinney	United States	5.96	
14	B	Wang Kuo-huei	Chinese Taipei	5.87	
15	A	Lara Gerada	Malta	5.42	
16	A	Rania Estephan	Lebanon	5.41	
17	B	Candyss Odle	Guyana	4.92	
18	?	Vilayvanh Vongphachanh	Laos	4.38	
19	?	Diane Noa	Tonga	4.35	
20	?	Thaimi O'Reilly	Italy	3.93	

=== Final ===
Rank	Athlete	Nationality	Result	Notes
1st place, gold medalist(s)	Maurren Maggi	Brazil	6.83	
2nd place, silver medalist(s)	Guan Yingnan	China	6.56	
3rd place, bronze medalist(s)	Kumiko Ikeda	Japan	6.52	
4	Zita Ajkler	Hungary	6.51	
5	Stiliani Pilatou	Greece	6.48	
6	Anastasiya Ilyina	Russia	6.43	
7	Nadezhda Bazhenova	Russia	6.39	
8	Aurélie Felix	France	6.21	
9	Lucie Komrsková	Czech Republic	6.21	
10	Nicole Herschmann	Germany	6.19	
11	Elisha Williams	United States	6.17	
12	Tina Čarman	Slovenia	5.88	
