= 2001 European Athletics U23 Championships – Women's long jump =

The women's long jump event at the 2001 European Athletics U23 Championships was held in Amsterdam, Netherlands, at Olympisch Stadion on 12 and 13 July.

== Medalists ==
Gold	Jade Johnson; United Kingdom
Silver	Concepción Montaner; Spain
Bronze	Aurélie Félix; France

== Results ==
=== Final ===
13 July

Rank	Name	Nationality	Attempts						Result	Notes
Rank	Name	Nationality	1	2	3	4	5	6	Result	Notes
1st place, gold medalist(s)	Jade Johnson	United Kingdom	6.31 (w: -0.4 m/s)	x	6.52 (w: 1.0 m/s)	6.50 (w: 0.3 m/s)	6.49 (w: 1.1 m/s)	x	6.52 (w: 1.0 m/s)	
2nd place, silver medalist(s)	Concepción Montaner	Spain	6.28 (w: 0.0 m/s)	6.46 (w: -0.5 m/s)	6.28 (w: 0.5 m/s)	6.40 (w: 0.5 m/s)	6.08 (w: -0.9 m/s)	6.46 (w: -0.5 m/s)	6.46 (w: -0.5 m/s)	
3rd place, bronze medalist(s)	Aurélie Félix	France	6.22 (w: -1.0 m/s)	6.20 (w: -0.4 m/s)	6.41 (w: 0.9 m/s)	x	6.28 (w: -0.3 m/s)	x	6.41 (w: 0.9 m/s)	
4	Silvia Favre	Italy	6.21 (w: 0.1 m/s)	x	6.03 (w: -1.1 m/s)	6.27 (w: -0.5 m/s)	6.11 (w: -0.9 m/s)	x	6.27 (w: -0.5 m/s)	
5	Irina Yermolayeva	Russia	6.11 (w: 1.2 m/s)	x	6.22 (w: 0.5 m/s)	6.22 (w: 0.1 m/s)	6.10 (w: 0.8 m/s)	x	6.22 (w: 0.5 m/s)	
6	Livia Pruteanu	Romania	5.77 (w: 0.5 m/s)	5.94 (w: -1.0 m/s)	6.05 (w: 0.6 m/s)	5.99 (w: 0.2 m/s)	5.86 (w: -0.3 m/s)	6.18 (w: 1.7 m/s)	6.18 (w: 1.7 m/s)	
7	Styliani Pilatou	Greece	x	5.82 (w: 1.3 m/s)	6.06 (w: 0.8 m/s)	x	5.72 (w: 0.3 m/s)	x	6.06 (w: 0.8 m/s)	
8	Jana Velďáková	Slovakia	5.91 (w: -0.1 m/s)	5.96 (w: 1.3 m/s)	6.02 (w: 1.1 m/s)	5.88 (w: 0.0 m/s)	x	5.81 (w: 0.8 m/s)	6.02 (w: 1.1 m/s)	
9	Svetlana Zaytseva	Russia	5.97 (w: -0.9 m/s)	5.56 (w: -1.3 m/s)	x				5.97 (w: -0.9 m/s)	
10	Célia Harmenil	France	5.88 (w: -0.2 m/s)	5.36 (w: -1.4 m/s)	5.60 (w: -0.2 m/s)				5.88 (w: -0.2 m/s)	
11	Arantza Loureiro	Spain	x	5.87 (w: -1.7 m/s)	5.62 (w: -0.7 m/s)				5.87 (w: -1.7 m/s)	
12	Ernesta Paulauskaitė	Lithuania	5.76 (w: -1.7 m/s)	5.61 (w: 0.8 m/s)	5.57 (w: 0.1 m/s)				5.76 (w: -1.7 m/s)	

=== Qualifications ===
12 July
Qualifying 6.45 or 12 best to the Final

==== Group A ====
Rank	Name	Nationality	Result	Notes
1	Jade Johnson	United Kingdom	6.50 (w: -0.2 m/s)	Q
2	Concepción Montaner	Spain	6.25 (w: 0.3 m/s)	q
3	Svetlana Zaytseva	Russia	6.03 (w: -0.5 m/s)	q
4	Livia Pruteanu	Romania	6.02 (w: 1.2 m/s)	q
5	Ernesta Paulauskaitė	Lithuania	6.01 (w: -0.2 m/s)	q
6	Aurélie Félix	France	6.01 (w: -0.1 m/s)	q
7	Maria Chiara Baccini	Italy	5.70 (w: 0.4 m/s)	

==== Group B ====
Rank	Name	Nationality	Result	Notes
1	Irina Yermolayeva	Russia	6.32 (w: 1.1 m/s)	q
2	Silvia Favre	Italy	6.26 (w: 0.4 m/s)	q
3	Styliani Pilatou	Greece	6.22 (w: -0.4 m/s)	q
4	Arantza Loureiro	Spain	6.15 w (w: 2.7 m/s)	q
5	Célia Harmenil	France	5.94 (w: -1.4 m/s)	q
6	Jana Velďáková	Slovakia	5.90 (w: 0.7 m/s)	q
7	Karolina Binas	Poland	5.80 (w: 0.1 m/s)	

== Participation ==
According to an unofficial count, 14 athletes from 10 countries participated in the event.

- France (2)
- Greece (1)
- Italy (2)
- Lithuania (1)
- Poland (1)
- Romania (1)
- Russia (2)
- Slovakia (1)
- Spain (2)
- United Kingdom (1)
