= Athletics at the 1999 Summer Universiade – Women's long jump =

The women's long jump event at the 1999 Summer Universiade was held at the Estadio Son Moix in Palma de Mallorca, Spain on 12 and 13 July.

== Medalists ==
Gold	Silver	Bronze
Olena Shekhovtsova; Ukraine	Adrien Sawyer; United States	Maurren Maggi; Brazil

== Results ==
=== Qualification ===
Qualification: 6.40 (Q) or at least 12 best performers (q) advance to the final

Rank	Group	Athlete	Nationality	#1	#2	#3	Result	Notes
1	A	Olena Shekhovtsova	Ukraine				6.81	Q, SB
2	A	Aurélie Felix	France				6.58	Q
3	B	Maurren Maggi	Brazil				6.56	Q
4	A	Zita Ajkler	Hungary				6.43	Q
5	A	Marcela Umnik	Slovenia				6.41	Q
6	B	Peng Fengmei	China				6.40	Q
7	A	Angela Brown	United States				6.36	q, PB
7	B	Maho Hanaoka	Japan				6.36	q, PB
9	B	Sofia Schulte	Germany				6.34	q
10	A	Éva Miklós	Romania				6.33	q
11	B	Adrien Sawyer	United States				6.32	q
12	A	Alice Falaiye	Canada				6.24	q
13	A	Gilda Massa	Peru				6.23	NR
14	A	Olga Cepero	Cuba				6.22	
14	A	Edyta Sibiga	Poland				6.22	
14	B	Wang Kuo-hui	Chinese Taipei				6.22	
17	A	Lu Xin	China				6.21	
17	A	Katja Umlauft	Germany				6.21	
17	B	Bożena Trzcińska	Poland				6.21	
20	B	Lucie Komrsková	Czech Republic				6.20	
21	B	Charlene Lawrence	South Africa				6.13	
22	A	Carlota Castrejana	Spain	x	6.04	x	6.04	
23	B	Betsabee Berrios	Puerto Rico				5.90	
24	B	Kerrie Perkins	Australia				5.72	
25	A	Tshoseletso Nkala	Botswana				5.66	
26	B	Wan Kin Yee	Hong Kong				5.61	
27	B	Mónica Castro	Chile				5.59	
28	B	Ericka Varillas	Peru				5.24	
29	B	Dinh Thi Thuy	Vietnam				4.88	PB
	B	Kristel Berendsen	Estonia				NM	
	B	Christine Sciberras	Malta				DNS	

=== Final ===
Rank	Athlete	Nationality	#1	#2	#3	#4	#5	#6	Result	Notes
1st place, gold medalist(s)	Olena Shekhovtsova	Ukraine	6.67	6.92	x	x	x	6.71	6.92	SB
2nd place, silver medalist(s)	Adrien Sawyer	United States							6.61	
3rd place, bronze medalist(s)	Maurren Maggi	Brazil							6.58	
4	Angela Brown	United States							6.48	PB
5	Zita Ajkler	Hungary							6.46	
6	Peng Fengmei	China							6.45	
7	Marcela Umnik	Slovenia							6.37	
8	Alice Falaiye	Canada							6.37	SB
9	Maho Hanaoka	Japan							6.33	
10	Aurélie Felix	France							6.33	
11	Éva Miklós	Romania							6.22	
12	Sofia Schulte	Germany							6.04	
