= 2002 European Athletics Championships – Women's long jump =

Women's long jump at the European Athletics Championships

The women's long jump at the 2002 European Athletics Championships were held at the Olympic Stadium on August 6–7.

On 8 March 2013, the IAAF announced that following retesting of samples taken at the championships, it had been found that Tatyana Kotova of Russia had taken a banned substance. It was not announced whether this would mean an alteration in the medal result.

== Medalists ==
Gold	Silver	Bronze
Tatyana Kotova; Russia	Jade Johnson; Great Britain	Tünde Vaszi; Hungary

== Results ==
=== Qualification ===
Qualification: Qualification Performance 6.60 (Q) or at least 12 best performers advance to the final.

Rank	Group	Athlete	Nationality	#1	#2	#3	Result	Notes
1	B	Jade Johnson	Great Britain				6.60	Q
2	B	Tünde Vaszi	Hungary				6.59	q
3	A	Tatyana Kotova	Russia				6.50	q
4	A	Olga Rublyova	Russia				6.45	q
5	A	Stiliani Pilatou	Greece				6.43	q
6	B	Concepción Montaner	Spain	X	X	6.43	6.43	q
7	A	Sofia Schulte	Germany				6.42	q
8	B	Heike Drechsler	Germany				6.41	q
9	A	Valentīna Gotovska	Latvia				6.35	q
9	B	Antonia Yordanova	Bulgaria				6.35	q
11	A	Naide Gomes	Portugal				6.33	q
12	B	Liliana Zagacka	Poland				6.31	q
13	A	Johanna Halkoaho	Finland				6.30	
14	B	Cristina Nicolau	Romania				6.29	
15	B	Bianca Kappler	Germany				6.20	
16	A	Zita Ajkler	Hungary				6.16	
17	B	Irina Melnikova	Russia				6.13	
18	B	Niki Xanthou	Greece				6.12	
19	B	Monica Falchi	Italy				6.09	
20	A	Silvia Favre	Italy				6.08	
21	A	Olivia Wöckinger	Austria				6.06	
22	B	Tina Carman	Slovenia				6.03	
23	B	Laura Gatto	Italy				5.92	
	A	Niurka Montalvo	Spain	X	X	X	NM	

=== Final ===
Rank	Athlete	Nationality	#1	#2	#3	#4	#5	#6	Result	Notes
1st place, gold medalist(s)	Tatyana Kotova	Russia	6.78	X	X	6.81	6.85	X	6.85	
2nd place, silver medalist(s)	Jade Johnson	Great Britain	6.66	6.72	X	6.52	6.73	6.58	6.73	PB
3rd place, bronze medalist(s)	Tünde Vaszi	Hungary	6.47	6.44	6.47	X	6.73	6.57	6.73	
4	Concepción Montaner	Spain	6.52	X	6.67	6.56	6.44	6.47	6.67	
5	Heike Drechsler	Germany	6.35	6.49	X	6.63	6.64	X	6.64	
6	Stiliani Pilatou	Greece	6.53	6.58	X	6.48	6.46	X	6.58	
7	Olga Rublyova	Russia	6.46	X	6.58	4.71	X	X	6.58	
8	Sofia Schulte	Germany	6.25	6.34	6.43	4.37	5.84	6.14	6.43	
9	Liliana Zagacka	Poland	6.01	X	6.24				6.24	
10	Naide Gomes	Portugal	6.23	X	6.00				6.23	
11	Antonia Yordanova	Bulgaria	6.11	X	6.21				6.21	
12	Valentīna Gotovska	Latvia	X	X	5.93				5.93	
