= 2005 European Athletics Indoor Championships – Women's long jump =

The Women's long jump event at the 2005 European Athletics Indoor Championships was held on March 4–5.

== Medalists ==
| Gold | Silver | Bronze |
|---|---|---|
| Naide Gomes Portugal | Stiliani Pilatou Greece | Adina Anton Romania; Bianca Kappler Germany (*) |

(*) Bianca Kappler had originally won the competition with a jump measured as 6.96 metres. The measurement, however, was incorrect. Kappler pointed out the mistake and was awarded a bronze medal for fair play.

== Results ==
=== Qualification ===
Qualifying perf. 6.63 (Q) or 8 best performers (q) advanced to the Final.

| Rank | Group | Athlete | Nationality | #1 | #2 | #3 | Result | Note |
|---|---|---|---|---|---|---|---|---|
| 1 | A | Naide Gomes | Portugal | 6.60 | 6.48 | 6.49 | 6.60 | q, NR |
| 2 | B | Anastasiya Ilyina | Russia | X | 6.54 | 6.27 | 6.54 | q |
| 3 | B | Ineta Radēviča | Latvia | 6.42 | 6.51 | – | 6.51 | q |
| 4 | A | Lyudmila Kolchanova | Russia | 6.46 | 6.37 | 6.35 | 6.46 | q |
| 5 | A | Bianca Kappler | Germany | 6.32 | 6.35 | 6.45 | 6.45 | q |
| 6 | B | Adina Anton | Romania | X | 6.45 | 6.22 | 6.45 | q |
| 7 | B | Stiliani Pilatou | Greece | 6.38 | 5.94 | 6.44 | 6.44 | q |
| 8 | B | Alina Militaru | Romania | 6.29 | 6.37 | 6.41 | 6.41 | q |
| 9 | A | Tünde Vaszi | Hungary | 6.40 | X | X | 6.40 | |
| 10 | A | Angelica Badea | Romania | 6.37 | X | 6.29 | 6.37 | |
| 11 | A | Irina Melnikova | Russia | 6.33 | 6.07 | 6.22 | 6.33 | |
| 12 | A | Valentīna Gotovska | Latvia | X | 6.29 | 6.05 | 6.29 | |
| 13 | A | Denisa Ščerbová | Czech Republic | 6.20 | X | 6.28 | 6.28 | |
| 14 | B | Martina Darmovzalová | Czech Republic | 6.26 | 6.19 | X | 6.26 | |
| 15 | B | Niurka Montalvo | Spain | 6.23 | 6.24 | 6.25 | 6.25 | |
| 16 | B | Kristel Berendsen | Estonia | X | X | 6.25 | 6.25 | |
| 17 | A | Jesenija Volzankina | Latvia | 6.21 | 5.75 | 6.19 | 6.21 | |
| 18 | B | Olivia Wöckinger | Austria | 6.20 | 6.00 | X | 6.20 | |
| 19 | A | Concepcion Montaner | Spain | X | X | 6.19 | 6.19 | |
| 19 | A | Panayiota Koutsioumari | Greece | X | 6.19 | X | 6.19 | |
| 21 | B | Barbara Leuthard | Switzerland | 6.15 | 6.09 | 6.09 | 6.15 | |
| 22 | B | Jana Velďáková | Slovakia | 4.30 | X | X | 4.30 | |
| | B | Jade Johnson | Great Britain | X | X | X | NM | |

=== Final ===
| Rank | Athlete | Nationality | #1 | #2 | #3 | #4 | #5 | #6 | Result | Note |
|---|---|---|---|---|---|---|---|---|---|---|
| 1st place, gold medalist(s) | Naide Gomes | Portugal | 6.70 | X | X | 6.67 | 6.61 | 6.58 | 6.70 | NR |
| 2nd place, silver medalist(s) | Stiliani Pilatou | Greece | 6.51 | 6.64 | 6.53 | X | 6.28 | 6.14 | 6.64 | SB |
| 3rd place, bronze medalist(s) | Adina Anton | Romania | X | 6.41 | X | 6.40 | X | 6.59 | 6.59 | |
| 3rd place, bronze medalist(s) | Bianca Kappler | Germany | 6.44 | X | X | 6.53 | 6.48 | (*) | 6.53 | |
| 5 | Ineta Radēviča | Latvia | 6.58 | 6.25 | 6.39 | 6.38 | X | 6.56 | 6.58 | |
| 6 | Lyudmila Kolchanova | Russia | 6.49 | 6.45 | X | 6.56 | X | X | 6.56 | |
| 7 | Alina Militaru | Romania | 6.35 | 6.45 | 6.49 | 6.33 | X | 6.53 | 6.53 | |
| 8 | Anastasiya Ilyina | Russia | X | 6.33 | X | 6.44 | 6.45 | 6.52 | 6.52 | |

(*) The jump was incorrectly measured as 6.96 m.
