= 1993 Pan American Junior Athletics Championships =

VII Pan American Junior Athletics Championships
- Dates: July 15–17
- Host city: Winnipeg, Manitoba, Canada
- Level: Junior
- Events: 41
- Participation: about 288 athletes from 19 nations

The 7th Pan American Junior Athletics Championships were held in Winnipeg, Manitoba, on July 15–17, 1993.

== Participation (unofficial) ==
Detailed result lists can be found on the "World Junior Athletics History" website. An unofficial count yields the number of about 288 athletes from about 19 countries: Argentina (4), Bahamas (6), Barbados (5), Bermuda (4), Brazil (12), British Virgin Islands (1), Canada (68), Chile (1), Cuba (31), Ecuador (2), Guyana (2), Jamaica (27), Mexico (34), Panama (1), Peru (1), Puerto Rico (9), Trinidad and Tobago (5), United States (74), U.S. Virgin Islands (1).

== Medal summary ==
Medal winners are published. Complete results can be found on the "World Junior Athletics History" website.

=== Men ===
Event	Gold		Silver		Bronze	
100 metres	Jonathan Burrell (USA)	10.38	Tim Harden (USA)	10.63	Obadele Thompson (BAR)	10.76
200 metres	Jermaine Stafford (USA)	20.94w	Obadele Thompson (BAR)	21.18w	Martin Proulx (CAN)	21.34w
400 metres	Calvin Harrison (USA)	45.79	Ben Beyers (USA)	46.48	Christopher Davis (CAN)	47.17
800 metres	Kevin Sullivan (CAN)	1:48.95	Alain Miranda (CUB)	1:49.37	Jeremy Stallings (USA)	1:50.58
1500 metres	Eric O'Brien (USA)	3:51.51	Ereisis Torres (CUB)	3:53.20	Mariano Tarilo (ARG)	3:54.40
5000 metres	Fábio Víscola (BRA)	14:35.85	Elías Bastos (BRA)	14:40.41	Cruz Gallegos (USA)	14:41.70
10,000 metres	Elías Bastos (BRA)	30:21.12	Fábio Víscola (BRA)	30:29.62	Mario Vázquez (MEX)	30:35.23
3000 metres steeplechase	Jean-Nicolas Duval (CAN)	9:04.49	Robert Duncan (USA)	9:07.13	Casey O'Shea (USA)	9:13.89
110 metres hurdles	Jeff Jackson (USA)	14.09	Erik Batte (CUB)	14.11	Neil Gardner (JAM)	14.30
400 metres hurdles	Alejandro Argudín (CUB)	51.08	Everson Teixeira (BRA)	51.66	Ian Weakley (JAM)	51.94
4 × 100 metres relay	United States; Marcus Broach; Tim Harden; Jermaine Stafford; Jonathan Burrell	39.72	Canada; Troy Dos Santos; Martin Proulx; Dave Tomlin; Eric Frempong-Manso	40.26	Jamaica; Jason Shelton; Leon Gordon; Steve Reid; Bernard Burrell	40.56
4 × 400 metres relay	United States; Johnson; Alvin Harrison; Ben Beyers; Calvin Harrison	3:04.38	Cuba; Alejandro Argudín; Vladimir Lombillo; Alain Miranda; Robelis Darroman	3:09.00	Canada; Chris Davis; Kevin Sullivan; Bwana Smith; Marlon Dechausey	3:09.83
10,000 metres track walk	Jefferson Pérez (ECU)	39:50.73	Will Van Axen (USA)	44:25.95	João Sendeski (BRA)	46:10.62
High jump	Dillon Phelps (USA)	2.21	Mike Caza (CAN)	2.12	Billy Green (USA)	2.09
Pole vault	Lawrence Johnson (USA)	5.50	Ryan Dall (USA)	4.70	Bryan Jeffrey (CAN)	4.60
Long jump	Juan Garzón (CUB)	7.74	Leon Gordon (JAM)	7.60	Victor Houston (BAR)	7.60
Triple jump	Aliecer Urrutia (CUB)	16.32w	Michel Martínez (CUB)	15.86	John Jordan (USA)	15.68w
Shot put	Adam Nelson (USA)	16.56	Jonathan Ogden (USA)	16.36	Jason Tunks (CAN)	15.50
Discus throw	Manuel Pequeno (CUB)	51.60	John Schulte (USA)	51.58	Julio Piñero (ARG)	50.70
Hammer throw	Lester St. Ross (CUB)	61.44	Wes Boudreau (CAN)	59.30	Juan Cerra (ARG)	57.78
Javelin throw	Delyle Woods (USA)	71.88	Isbel Luaces (CUB)	70.50	Raul Constantinescu (CAN)	67.38
Decathlon	Raúl Duany (CUB)	7482	Ray Livingston (USA)	7091	Ryan Theriault (USA)	6762

=== Women ===
Event	Gold		Silver		Bronze	
100 metres	Nikole Mitchell (JAM)	11.67	Savatheda Fynes (BAH)	12.00	Alicia Tyson (TRI)	12.03
200 metres	Jennifer Wilson (USA)	23.63	Savatheda Fynes (BAH)	23.69	Debbie Ferguson (BAH)	23.85
400 metres	Claudine Williams (JAM)	52.01	Monique Hennagan (USA)	53.06	Vernetta Rolle (BAH)	53.80
800 metres	Jawauna McMullen (USA)	2:06.99	Nicki Webber (USA)	2:07.13	Heather De Geest (CAN)	2:07.50
1500 metres	Janeth Caizalitín (ECU)	4:30.61	Becki Wells (USA)	4:31.03	Angela Graham (CAN)	4:32.19
3000 metres	Shelley Taylor (USA)	9:44.45	Amanda White (USA)	9:51.24	Mónica Martell (MEX)	9:54.15
10,000 metres	Ana Mejía (MEX)	36:10.68	Cynthia Moreshead (USA)	36:11.02	Mariela González (CUB)	36:12.65
100 metres hurdles	Damaris Anderson (CUB)	13.65	Tonya Williams (USA)	13.77	Kim Carson (USA)	13.79
400 metres hurdles	Tonya Williams (USA)	58.18	Erin Blunt (USA)	58.52	Wynsome Cole (JAM)	58.74
4 × 100 metres relay	United States; Kimberley Carson; Michelle Perry; Tonya Williams; Jennifer Wilson	45.10	Jamaica; Paula Douglas; Michelle O'Horro; Kerry-Ann Richards; Beverley Langley	45.36	Cuba; Idalia Hechavarría; Daimí Pernía; Damaris Anderson; Regla Cárdeñas	45.84
4 × 400 metres relay	Jamaica; Winsome Cole; Tanya Jarrett; Ellen Grant; Claudine Williams	3:32.70	United States; Tiffany Weatherford; Vonda Newhouse; Cynthia Newsome; Monique Hennagan	3:37.64	Bahamas; Debbie Ferguson; Tonique Williams; Savatheda Fynes; Vernetta Rolle	3:40.77
5000 metres track walk	Maribel Rebollo (MEX)	24:37.46	Adrianna Hernández (MEX)	24:49.90	Lisa Chumbley (USA)	25:55.34
High jump	Amy Acuff (USA)	1.83	Sarah Pardy (CAN)	1.80	Nora Weber (USA)	1.74
Long jump	Lacena Golding (JAM)	6.27	Lissete Cuza (CUB)	6.03w	Kimberly Warner (USA)	5.96w
Triple jump	Olga Cepero (CUB)	13.01	Suzette Lee (JAM)	12.89	Lissete Cuza (CUB)	12.59
Shot put	Yumileidi Cumbá (CUB)	17.55	Alina Pupo (CUB)	16.33	Valeyta Althouse (USA)	16.02
Discus throw	Melinda Wirtz (USA)	49.96	Sonia O'Farrill (CUB)	45.62	Elizabeth Sánchez (MEX)	45.30
Javelin throw	María Caridad Álvarez (CUB)	57.00	Deana Alexander (USA)	48.44	Odalys Palma (CUB)	46.04
Heptathlon	Regla Cárdenas (CUB)	5600	Melissa Flandera (USA)	5031	Najuma Fletcher (GUY)	4986

== Medal table (unofficial) ==
* Host nation (Canada)

Rank	Nation	Gold	Silver	Bronze	Total
1	United States	18	18	11	47
2	Cuba	11	9	4	24
3	Jamaica	4	3	4	11
4	Canada*	2	4	8	14
5	Brazil	2	3	1	6
6	Mexico	2	1	3	6
7	Ecuador	2	0	0	2
8	Bahamas	0	2	3	5
9	Barbados	0	1	2	3
10	Argentina	0	0	3	3
11	Guyana	0	0	1	1
11	Trinidad and Tobago	0	0	1	1
Totals (12 entries)		41	41	41	123
