= 1990 World Junior Championships in Athletics – Women's long jump =

The women's long jump event at the 1990 World Junior Championships in Athletics was held in Plovdiv, Bulgaria, at Deveti Septemvri Stadium on 10 and 11 August.

== Medalists ==
Gold	Iva Prandzheva; Bulgaria
Silver	Erica Johansson; Sweden
Bronze	Sandrine Hennart; Belgium

== Results ==
=== Final ===
11 August

Rank	Name	Nationality	Attempts						Result	Notes
Rank	Name	Nationality	1	2	3	4	5	6	Result	Notes
1st place, gold medalist(s)	Iva Prandzheva	Bulgaria	6.28 (w: -0.4 m/s)	6.32 (w: -0.1 m/s)	6.34 (w: -0.1 m/s)	5.95 (w: +1.9 m/s)	6.45 (w: +1.0 m/s)	6.53 (w: +1.3 m/s)	6.53 (w: +1.3 m/s)	
2nd place, silver medalist(s)	Erica Johansson	Sweden	6.36 (w: -0.2 m/s)	4.87 (w: +0.2 m/s)	6.27 (w: -0.6 m/s)	x	6.50 (w: +0.3 m/s)	6.40 (w: +1.0 m/s)	6.50 (w: +0.3 m/s)	
3rd place, bronze medalist(s)	Sandrine Hennart	Belgium	6.49 (w: +0.8 m/s)	6.31 (w: -0.2 m/s)	6.21 (w: -0.3 m/s)	6.27 (w: +1.2 m/s)	6.37 (w: +1.1 m/s)	6.05 (w: +0.2 m/s)	6.49 (w: +0.8 m/s)	
4	Juliana Yendork	United States	6.05 (w: -0.7 m/s)	6.17 (w: +0.2 m/s)	6.23 (w: +0.7 m/s)	x	6.35 (w: +0.2 m/s)	6.48 (w: +1.0 m/s)	6.48 (w: +1.0 m/s)	
5	Chioma Ajunwa	Nigeria	6.46 (w: +0.7 m/s)	6.40 (w: +0.8 m/s)	6.32 (w: +0.5 m/s)	x	6.33 (w: -0.4 m/s)	6.25 (w: +0.8 m/s)	6.46 (w: +0.7 m/s)	
6	Yvonne Mathesius	East Germany	6.31 (w: -0.4 m/s)	6.30 (w: +0.6 m/s)	x	6.25 (w: +1.4 m/s)	x	6.46 (w: +1.5 m/s)	6.46 (w: +1.5 m/s)	
7	Lyudmila Galkina	Soviet Union	5.90 (w: +0.4 m/s)	6.29 (w: +0.1 m/s)	x	6.33 w (w: +2.3 m/s)	6.45 (w: +0.9 m/s)	6.42 (w: +1.2 m/s)	6.45 (w: +0.9 m/s)	
8	Liu Jingmin	China	6.05 (w: -0.2 m/s)	6.24 (w: +0.2 m/s)	6.25 w (w: +2.1 m/s)	5.95 (w: -0.2 m/s)	6.14 (w: +0.2 m/s)	5.75 (w: -0.4 m/s)	6.25 w (w: +2.1 m/s)	
9	Joanne Wise	United Kingdom	6.12 (w: -0.2 m/s)	x	6.14 (w: +0.8 m/s)				6.14 (w: +0.8 m/s)	
10	Mihaela Moldan	Romania	5.96 (w: -0.6 m/s)	x	x				5.96 (w: -0.6 m/s)	
11	Diane Guthrie	Jamaica	5.76 (w: -1.2 m/s)	5.68 (w: -0.5 m/s)	5.95 (w: +0.1 m/s)				5.95 (w: +0.1 m/s)	
	Lisa Taylor	United States	x	x	x				NM	

=== Qualifications ===
10 Aug

==== Group A ====
Rank	Name	Nationality	Attempts			Result	Notes
Rank	Name	Nationality	1	2	3	Result	Notes
1	Sandrine Hennart	Belgium	6.54 (w: +1.0 m/s)	-	-	6.54 (w: +1.0 m/s)	Q
2	Juliana Yendork	United States	x	6.37 (w: -0.3 m/s)	-	6.37 (w: -0.3 m/s)	Q
3	Yvonne Mathesius	East Germany	5.79 (w: +0.6 m/s)	6.15 (w: +0.5 m/s)	6.29 (w: +0.2 m/s)	6.29 (w: +0.2 m/s)	Q
4	Lyudmila Galkina	Soviet Union	5.90 (w: -0.8 m/s)	5.87 (w: +0.1 m/s)	6.24 (w: -0.2 m/s)	6.24 (w: -0.2 m/s)	q
5	Liu Jingmin	China	6.22 (w: +1.2 m/s)	6.07 (w: -0.7 m/s)	6.06 (w: -0.3 m/s)	6.22 (w: +1.2 m/s)	q
6	Iva Prandzheva	Bulgaria	6.12 (w: +0.2 m/s)	x	5.99 (w: -0.3 m/s)	6.12 (w: +0.2 m/s)	q
7	Mihaela Moldan	Romania	6.10 (w: -0.3 m/s)	x	5.96 (w: -1.1 m/s)	6.10 (w: -0.3 m/s)	q
8	Elena Milan	Italy	5.44 (w: NWI)	x	5.95 (w: -0.2 m/s)	5.95 (w: -0.2 m/s)	
9	Maria de Souza	Brazil	x	x	5.93 (w: -0.2 m/s)	5.93 (w: -0.2 m/s)	
10	Kym Burns	Australia	x	5.72 (w: -0.3 m/s)	x	5.72 (w: -0.3 m/s)	
	Lucy Knight	Saint Kitts and Nevis	x	x	x	NM	

==== Group B ====
Rank	Name	Nationality	Attempts			Result	Notes
Rank	Name	Nationality	1	2	3	Result	Notes
1	Erica Johansson	Sweden	6.00 (w: +0.8 m/s)	6.11 (w: -2.0 m/s)	6.34 (w: +1.2 m/s)	6.34 (w: +1.2 m/s)	Q
2	Chioma Ajunwa	Nigeria	6.15 (w: -0.4 m/s)	6.31 (w: +0.3 m/s)	-	6.31 (w: +0.3 m/s)	Q
3	Diane Guthrie	Jamaica	x	6.03 (w: +1.3 m/s)	6.17 (w: +1.1 m/s)	6.17 (w: +1.1 m/s)	q
4	Joanne Wise	United Kingdom	4.24 (w: +1.5 m/s)	6.03 (w: +1.0 m/s)	x	6.03 (w: +1.0 m/s)	q
5	Lisa Taylor	United States	x	5.99 (w: -0.6 m/s)	5.84 (w: -2.4 m/s)	5.99 (w: -0.6 m/s)	q
6	Patricia Domec	France	5.63 (w: -2.3 m/s)	x	5.95 (w: +0.5 m/s)	5.95 (w: +0.5 m/s)	
7	Carmen Neltner	West Germany	5.80 (w: -1.5 m/s)	5.84 (w: +1.0 m/s)	5.76 (w: -0.3 m/s)	5.84 (w: +1.0 m/s)	
8	Viktoriya Vershinina	Soviet Union	5.42 (w: -0.6 m/s)	5.76 (w: -1.2 m/s)	5.71 (w: -1.1 m/s)	5.76 (w: -1.2 m/s)	
9	Kamelia Dimitrova	Bulgaria	x	x	5.74 (w: -0.2 m/s)	5.74 (w: -0.2 m/s)	
10	Mileidis Portuondo	Cuba	x	5.50 (w: -0.4 m/s)	x	5.50 (w: -0.4 m/s)	
11	Fatima Yuksel	Turkey	x	x	5.20 (w: -3.0 m/s)	5.20 (w: -3.0 m/s)	

== Participation ==
According to an unofficial count, 22 athletes from 19 countries participated in the event.

- Australia (1)
- Belgium (1)
- Brazil (1)
- Bulgaria (2)
- China (1)
- Cuba (1)
- East Germany (1)
- France (1)
- Italy (1)
- Jamaica (1)
- Nigeria (1)
- Romania (1)
- Saint Kitts and Nevis (1)
- Soviet Union (2)
- Sweden (1)
- Turkey (1)
- United Kingdom (1)
- United States (2)
- West Germany (1)
