= 1998 European Athletics Championships – Women's long jump =

Women's long jump at the European Athletics Championships

The women's long jump at the 1998 European Athletics Championships was held at the Népstadion on 21 and 22 August.

== Medalists ==
| Gold | Heike Drechsler; Germany |
| Silver | Fiona May; Italy |
| Bronze | Lyudmila Galkina; Russia |

== Results ==
| KEY: | q | Better non-qualifiers | Q | Qualified | NR | National record | PB | Personal best | SB | Seasonal best |

=== Qualification ===
Qualification: Qualification Performance 6.65 (Q) or at least 12 best performers advance to the final.

| Rank | Group | Athlete | Nationality | #1 | #2 | #3 | Result | Notes |
|---|---|---|---|---|---|---|---|---|
| 1 | B | Lyudmila Galkina | Russia | | | | 6.83 | Q |
| 2 | A | Heike Drechsler | Germany | | | | 6.79 | Q |
| 2 | A | Johanna Halkoaho | Finland | | | | 6.79 | Q, PB |
| 4 | A | Erica Johansson | Sweden | | | | 6.74 | Q |
| 5 | B | Fiona May | Italy | | | | 6.73 | Q |
| 6 | B | Tünde Vaszi | Hungary | | | | 6.70 | Q |
| 7 | A | Linda Ferga | France | | | | 6.69 | Q |
| 8 | A | Magdalena Khristova | Bulgaria | | | | 6.60 | q |
| 9 | A | Susen Tiedtke | Germany | | | | 6.58 | q |
| 9 | B | Nadine Caster | France | | | | 6.58 | q |
| 11 | A | Zita Ajkler | Hungary | | | | 6.57 | q |
| 12 | B | Sarah Gautreau | France | | | | 6.56 | q |
| 13 | B | Camilla Johansson | Sweden | | | | 6.53 | |
| 14 | B | Nina Perevedentseva | Russia | | | | 6.52 | |
| 15 | A | Valentīna Gotovska | Latvia | | | | 6.47 | |
| 16 | B | Olena Shekhovtsova | Ukraine | | | | 6.46 | |
| 17 | A | Olga Rublyova | Russia | | | | 6.45 | |
| 18 | A | Dorota Brodowska | Poland | | | | 6.40 | |
| 19 | B | Agata Karczmarek | Poland | | | | 6.38 | |
| 20 | A | Hristína Athanasíou | Greece | | | | 6.34 | |
| 21 | B | Éva Miklós | Romania | | | | 6.29 | |
| 22 | B | Sofia Schulte | Germany | | | | 6.28 | |
| 23 | B | Heli Koivula | Finland | | | | 6.23 | |
| 24 | A | Anja Valant | Slovenia | | | | 6.19 | |
| | A | Olga Vasdeki | Greece | | | | DNS | |
| | B | Paraskevi Tsiamita | Greece | | | | DNS | |
| | B | Iva Prandzheva | Bulgaria | | | | DNS | |

=== Final ===
| Rank | Athlete | Nationality | #1 | #2 | #3 | #4 | #5 | #6 | Result | Notes |
|---|---|---|---|---|---|---|---|---|---|---|
| 1st place, gold medalist(s) | Heike Drechsler | Germany | x | 7.16 | 7.16 | x | x | x | 7.16 | |
| 2nd place, silver medalist(s) | Fiona May | Italy | 6.85 | 6.76 | 7.01 | 7.11 | 7.04 | 6.61 | 7.11 | NR |
| 3rd place, bronze medalist(s) | Lyudmila Galkina | Russia | x | x | 6.74 | 7.06 | 6.82 | x | 7.06 | |
| 4 | Tünde Vaszi | Hungary | 6.51 | 6.82 | 6.53 | x | 6.51 | 6.55 | 6.82 | |
| 5 | Erica Johansson | Sweden | 6.54 | 6.57 | 6.75 | 6.59 | 6.49 | x | 6.75 | |
| 6 | Zita Ajkler | Hungary | 6.43 | 6.64 | x | 6.42 | x | 6.39 | 6.64 | SB |
| 7 | Linda Ferga | France | x | 6.36 | 6.64 | x | 6.36 | 6.40 | 6.64 | |
| 8 | Susen Tiedtke | Germany | 6.43 | x | 6.62 | 5.06 | 6.62 | x | 6.62 | |
| 9 | Nadine Caster | France | 6.25 | 6.45 | 6.55 | | | | 6.55 | |
| 10 | Johanna Halkoaho | Finland | x | 6.31 | 6.54 | | | | 6.54 | |
| 11 | Sarah Gautreau | France | 6.02 | 6.29 | 6.22 | | | | 6.29 | |
| | Magdalena Khristova | Bulgaria | x | x | x | | | | NM | |
