= Masters W50 long jump world record progression =

This is the progression of world record improvements of the long jump W50 division of Masters athletics.

Key

Incomplete information Pending better indoor records

Distance	Wind	Athlete	Nationality	Birthdate	Age	Location	Date	Ref
5.73 m i		Sandrine Hennart	Belgium	12 December 1972	53 years, 43 days	Louvain-la-Neuve	24 January 2026	
5.72 m	(+1.1 m/s)	Sandrine Hennart	Belgium	12 December 1972	51 years, 194 days	Forest	23 June 2024	
5.53 m	(−2.4 m/s)	Sandrine Hennart	Belgium	12 December 1972	51 years, 173 days	Braine-l'Alleud	2 June 2024	
5.64 m i		Sandrine Hennart	Belgium	12 December 1972	51 years, 5 days	Obourg	17 December 2023	
5.48 m	(+0.5 m/s)	Maria Costanza Moroni	Italy	23 March 1969	52 years, 165 days	Mondovì	4 September 2021	
5.57 m i		Petra Bajeat	France	6 March 1966	53 years, 19 days	Toruń	25 March 2019	
5.53 m i		Petra Bajeat	France	6 March 1966	52 years, 14 days	Madrid	20 March 2018	
5.41 m	(+1.5 m/s)	Marie Kay	Australia	18 January 1960	50 years, 74 days	Perth	2 April 2010	
5.40 m	(+1.7 m/s)	Phil Raschker	United States	21 February 1947	50 years, 51 days	Atlanta	13 April 1997	
5.25 m	NWI	Jan Hynes	Australia	3 April 1944	50 years, 178 days	Brisbane	28 September 1994	
5.02 m	(+0.3 m/s)	Christiane Schmalbruch	Germany	8 January 1937	54 years, 198 days	Turku	25 July 1991	
5.25 m	NWI	Christiane Schmalbruch	Germany	8 January 1937	53 years, 175 days	Budapest	2 July 1990	
5.04 m	NWI	Maeve Kyle	Ireland	6 October 1928	50 years, 294 days	Hannover	27 July 1979	
