= 1992 World Junior Championships in Athletics – Women's long jump =

The women's long jump event at the 1992 World Junior Championships in Athletics was held in Seoul, South Korea, at Olympic Stadium on 19 and 20 September.

== Medalists ==
Gold	Erica Johansson; Sweden
Silver	Nicole Devonish; Canada
Bronze	Yu Huaxiu; China

== Results ==
=== Final ===
20 September

Rank	Name	Nationality	Attempts						Result	Notes
Rank	Name	Nationality	1	2	3	4	5	6	Result	Notes
1st place, gold medalist(s)	Erica Johansson	Sweden	6.50 (w: -0.9 m/s)	x	6.57 (w: -0.2 m/s)	x	4.44 (w: -0.4 m/s)	6.65 (w: +0.8 m/s)	6.65 (w: +0.8 m/s)	
2nd place, silver medalist(s)	Nicole Devonish	Canada	6.43 (w: -0.4 m/s)	6.20 (w: -0.8 m/s)	6.29 (w: -0.5 m/s)	6.13 (w: -1.0 m/s)	6.40 (w: -1.0 m/s)	6.19 (w: +0.1 m/s)	6.43 (w: -0.4 m/s)	
3rd place, bronze medalist(s)	Yu Huaxiu	China	5.60 (w: -0.6 m/s)	6.08 (w: -1.1 m/s)	5.85 (w: -0.4 m/s)	6.26 (w: +0.1 m/s)	4.36 (w: -0.1 m/s)	6.08 (w: +0.1 m/s)	6.26 (w: +0.1 m/s)	
4	Heli Koivula	Finland	5.96 (w: -0.7 m/s)	6.14 (w: -0.5 m/s)	x	6.08 (w: -0.6 m/s)	x	x	6.14 (w: -0.5 m/s)	
5	Cristina Morujão	Portugal	5.95 (w: -0.6 m/s)	6.03 (w: +0.7 m/s)	5.85 (w: -0.5 m/s)	x	6.00 (w: 0.0 m/s)	6.09 (w: 0.0 m/s)	6.09 (w: 0.0 m/s)	
6	Lacena Golding	Jamaica	x	5.86 (w: -0.9 m/s)	6.09 (w: +0.3 m/s)	x	5.86 (w: -0.9 m/s)	6.00 (w: +0.1 m/s)	6.09 (w: +0.3 m/s)	
7	Lissette Cuza	Cuba	6.00 (w: +1.0 m/s)	x	5.95 (w: +0.5 m/s)	x	6.06 (w: -0.3 m/s)	6.00 (w: 0.0 m/s)	6.06 (w: -0.3 m/s)	
8	Níki Xánthou	Greece	6.03 (w: -0.9 m/s)	6.02 (w: -0.6 m/s)	5.87 (w: -0.3 m/s)	5.93 (w: +0.1 m/s)	5.98 (w: +0.3 m/s)	x	6.03 (w: -0.9 m/s)	
9	Yaminoraidez Martínez	Cuba	5.92 (w: -0.6 m/s)	x	5.98 (w: -0.4 m/s)				5.98 (w: -0.4 m/s)	
10	Cristina Nicolau	Romania	5.98 (w: -0.9 m/s)	x	x				5.98 (w: -0.9 m/s)	
11	Fatima Dulkan	Turkey	5.84 (w: -1.0 m/s)	5.59 (w: +0.2 m/s)	5.72 (w: -0.1 m/s)				5.84 (w: -1.0 m/s)	
12	Hitomi Takamatsu	Japan	5.60 (w: -0.7 m/s)	5.76 (w: -0.5 m/s)	x				5.76 (w: -0.5 m/s)	

=== Qualifications ===
19 Sep

==== Group A ====
Rank	Name	Nationality	Attempts			Result	Notes
Rank	Name	Nationality	1	2	3	Result	Notes
1	Erica Johansson	Sweden	6.72 (w: +1.0 m/s)	-	-	6.72 (w: +1.0 m/s)	Q
2	Hitomi Takamatsu	Japan	6.19 (w: -0.5 m/s)	5.90 (w: -0.7 m/s)	x	6.19 (w: -0.5 m/s)	q
3	Yaminoraidez Martínez	Cuba	6.15 (w: +0.6 m/s)	6.13 (w: +1.3 m/s)	5.87 (w: -0.7 m/s)	6.15 (w: +0.6 m/s)	q
4	Cristina Nicolau	Romania	6.11 (w: -0.8 m/s)	5.91 (w: +1.3 m/s)	5.92 (w: +0.4 m/s)	6.11 (w: -0.8 m/s)	q
5	Lacena Golding	Jamaica	x	6.02 (w: +0.5 m/s)	6.04 (w: +1.3 m/s)	6.04 (w: +1.3 m/s)	q
6	Anja Vokuhl	Germany	x	6.02 (w: +0.5 m/s)	5.96 (w: -0.7 m/s)	6.02 (w: +0.5 m/s)	
7	Lim Suk-Hyun	South Korea	x	5.90 (w: +1.3 m/s)	5.93 (w: -0.1 m/s)	5.93 (w: -0.1 m/s)	
8	Ingvild Larsen	Norway	x	5.65 (w: +0.5 m/s)	5.93 (w: +0.4 m/s)	5.93 (w: +0.4 m/s)	
9	Olga Rublyova	Commonwealth of Independent States	5.61 (w: -0.5 m/s)	5.90 (w: +0.1 m/s)	x	5.90 (w: +0.1 m/s)	
10	Isabel Pereira	Portugal	x	x	5.38 (w: -0.8 m/s)	5.38 (w: -0.8 m/s)	
	Christina Öppinger	Austria	x	x	x	NM	

==== Group B ====
Rank	Name	Nationality	Attempts			Result	Notes
Rank	Name	Nationality	1	2	3	Result	Notes
1	Nicole Devonish	Canada	6.38 (w: +1.3 m/s)	-	-	6.38 (w: +1.3 m/s)	Q
2	Heli Koivula	Finland	x	6.34 (w: +0.5 m/s)	-	6.34 (w: +0.5 m/s)	Q
3	Cristina Morujão	Portugal	6.26 (w: -0.1 m/s)	-	-	6.26 (w: -0.1 m/s)	Q
4	Fatima Dulkan	Turkey	6.25 (w: +1.5 m/s)	-	-	6.25 (w: +1.5 m/s)	Q
5	Lissette Cuza	Cuba	6.13 (w: -0.5 m/s)	6.14 (w: +1.0 m/s)	6.15 (w: +0.6 m/s)	6.15 (w: +0.6 m/s)	q
6	Níki Xánthou	Greece	6.08 (w: +1.2 m/s)	5.89 (w: +0.6 m/s)	5.82 (w: -1.0 m/s)	6.08 (w: +1.2 m/s)	q
7	Yu Huaxiu	China	6.07 (w: -0.3 m/s)	4.14 (w: +1.6 m/s)	6.02 (w: +1.0 m/s)	6.07 (w: -0.3 m/s)	q
8	Lisa Armstrong	United Kingdom	5.88 (w: -0.2 m/s)	5.91 (w: +1.0 m/s)	4.42 w (w: +2.2 m/s)	5.91 (w: +1.0 m/s)	
9	Tatyana Matyashova	Commonwealth of Independent States	x	x	5.80 (w: -0.6 m/s)	5.80 (w: -0.6 m/s)	
10	Marcela Umnik	Slovenia	5.68 (w: -0.1 m/s)	x	x	5.68 (w: -0.1 m/s)	

== Participation ==
According to an unofficial count, 21 athletes from 18 countries participated in the event.

- Austria (1)
- Canada (1)
- China (1)
- Commonwealth of Independent States (2)
- Cuba (2)
- Finland (1)
- Germany (1)
- Greece (1)
- Jamaica (1)
- Japan (1)
- Norway (1)
- Portugal (2)
- Romania (1)
- Slovenia (1)
- South Korea (1)
- Sweden (1)
- Turkey (1)
- United Kingdom (1)
