= Athletics at the 1997 Summer Universiade – Women's long jump =

The women's long jump event at the 1997 Summer Universiade was held at the Stadio Cibali in Catania, Italy on 27 and 28 August.

== Medalists ==
Gold	Silver	Bronze
Olena Shekhovtsova; Ukraine	Viktoriya Vershynina; Ukraine	Cristina Nicolau; Romania

== Results ==
=== Qualification ===
Rank	Group	Athlete	Nationality	Result	Notes
1	?	Viktoriya Vershynina	Ukraine	6.59	
2	?	Olena Shekhovtsova	Ukraine	6.44	
3	A	Shonda Swift	United States	6.37	
4	A	Cristina Nicolau	Romania	6.30	
5	?	Angee Henry	United States	6.21	
6	?	Maria de Souza	Brazil	6.15	
7	?	Sofia Schulte	Germany	6.11	
8	?	Luciana dos Santos	Brazil	6.10	
9	?	Ksenija Predikaka	Slovenia	6.04	
10	?	Kym Burns	Australia	5.97	
11	?	Vicky Piggin	Australia	5.97	
12	?	Lin Chao-hsiu	Chinese Taipei	5.93	
13	?	Patience Itanyi	Nigeria	5.93	
14	?	Mónica Castro	Chile	5.89	
15	?	Vaida Ūsaitė	Lithuania	5.82	
15	?	Arianna Zivez	Italy	5.82	
17	?	Anja Valant	Slovenia	5.80	
18	?	Anna Smythe	New Zealand	5.51	
19	?	Isis Moreno	Panama	5.27	
20	?	Alexandra González	Puerto Rico	5.26	
21	?	Erika Varillas	Peru	5.06	
22	?	Patricia Traña	Nicaragua	4.93	
23	?	Hoa Nguyen Thi Than	Vietnam	4.91	

=== Final ===
Rank	Athlete	Nationality	Result	Notes
1st place, gold medalist(s)	Olena Shekhovtsova	Ukraine	6.78	
2nd place, silver medalist(s)	Viktoriya Vershynina	Ukraine	6.44	
3rd place, bronze medalist(s)	Cristina Nicolau	Romania	6.40	
4	Shonda Swift	United States	6.24	
5	Maria de Souza	Brazil	6.23	
6	Angee Henry	United States	6.17	
7	Sofia Schulte	Germany	6.12	
8	Kym Burns	Australia	6.09	
9	Luciana dos Santos	Brazil	6.02	
10	Ksenija Predikaka	Slovenia	6.00	
11	Vicky Piggin	Australia	5.99	
12	Lin Chao-hsiu	Chinese Taipei	5.83	
