= Lissette Cuza =

Cuban long jumper

Personal information
- Born: 26 February 1975 (age 51) Marianao, Cuba

Sport
- Sport: Track and field

Lissette Cuza Díaz (born 26 February 1975) is a retired Cuban athlete who specialised in the long jump. She represented her country at two Summer Olympics, in 1996 and 2000, failing to qualify for the final.

Her personal best of 6.99 metres, set in 2000 in Jena, is the current national record.

== Competition record ==
Year	Competition	Venue	Position	Event	Notes
Representing Cuba
1990	Central American and Caribbean Junior Championships (U18)	Havana, Cuba	2nd	Long jump	5.72 m
1992	World Junior Championships	Seoul, South Korea	7th	Long jump	6.06 m (wind: -0.3 m/s)
1993	Pan American Junior Championships	Winnipeg, Canada	2nd	Long jump	6.03 m (w)
1994	World Junior Championships	Lisbon, Portugal	16th (q)	Long jump	5.96 m (wind: +1.0 m/s)
1995	Central American and Caribbean Championships	Guatemala City, Guatemala	3rd	Long jump	6.04 m
1996	Ibero-American Championships	Medellín, Colombia	1st	Long jump	6.57 m
1996	Olympic Games	Atlanta, United States	13th (q)	Long jump	6.56 m
1999	Pan American Games	Winnipeg, Canada	6th	Long jump	6.29 m
2000	Olympic Games	Sydney, Australia	27th (q)	Long jump	6.25 m
