= 2000 Asian Athletics Championships – Women's triple jump =

The women's triple jump event at the 2000 Asian Athletics Championships was held in Jakarta, Indonesia on 28 August.

== Results ==
Rank	Name	Nationality	#1	#2	#3	#4	#5	#6	Result	Notes
1st place, gold medalist(s)	Yelena Parfyonova	Kazakhstan	13.71	13.56	14.08	x	x	13.63	14.08	
2nd place, silver medalist(s)	Miao Chunqing	China	13.69	13.91	13.87	13.89	14.01	x	14.01	
3rd place, bronze medalist(s)	Maho Hanaoka	Japan	x	13.15	13.46	13.48	x	13.67	13.67	
4	Anna Tarasova	Kazakhstan							13.59	
5	Wang Kuo-Huei	Chinese Taipei							13.32	
6	Lee Kyong-Sun	South Korea							13.20	
7	Phan Thi Thu Lan	Vietnam							13.01	
