= 2002 Asian Athletics Championships – Women's triple jump =

The women's triple jump event at the 2002 Asian Athletics Championships was held in Colombo, Sri Lanka on 11 August.

== Results ==
Rank	Name	Nationality	Result	Notes
1st place, gold medalist(s)	Wu Lingmei	China	13.83	
2nd place, silver medalist(s)	Mariya Sokova	Uzbekistan	13.81	
3rd place, bronze medalist(s)	Yelena Parfyonova	Kazakhstan	13.11	
4	Phan Thi Thu Lan	Vietnam	13.09w	
5	Fumiyo Yoshida	Japan	12.66w	
6	Anusha Ekneligoda	Sri Lanka	12.65	
7	A.A.D. Dinesh	Sri Lanka	11.61	SB
8	D.K. Hemachandra	Sri Lanka	11.55	PB
