= Anastasiya Ilyina =

Russian long and triple jumper (born 1982)

Anastasiya Ilyina (born 16 January 1982) is a retired Russian long and triple jumper.

In the triple jump she won the silver medal at the 1999 World Youth Championships, the gold medal at the 2000 World Junior Championships, and the gold medal at the 2001 European Junior Championships where she became a double gold medallist, winning the long jump as well. She also finished sixth at the 2001 Summer Universiade (long), tenth at the 2003 European U23 Championships (triple) and eighth at the 2005 European Indoor Championships (long jump).

Her personal best jumps were 6.66 metres in the long jump, achieved in July 2004 in Cheboksary; and 14.52 metres in the triple jump, achieved at the 2000 World Junior Championships.
