= Yelena Parfyonova =

Kazakhstani triple jumper (born 1974)

Medal record

Women's athletics

Representing Kazakhstan

Asian Championships
Gold medal – first place	2000 Jakarta	Triple jump
Bronze medal – third place	2002 Colombo	Triple jump

Asian Indoor Championships
Gold medal – first place	2006 Pattaya	Triple jump

Yelena Vladimirovna Parfyonova (Cyrillic: Елена Владимировна Парфёнова; born 26 January 1974 in North Kazakhstan Region, Kazakh SSR) is a retired Kazakhstani triple jumper. Her personal best jump is 14.33 metres, achieved in June 2008 in Almaty.

She won the gold medal at the 2000 Asian Championships, the silver medal at the 2002 Asian Championships and finished fourth at the 2005 Asian Championships. She also competed at the 2000 Olympic Games, the 2005 World Championships, the 2006 World Indoor Championships, the 2007 World Championships and the 2008 Olympic Games without reaching the final.

== Achievements ==
Year	Competition	Venue	Position	Notes
Representing Kazakhstan
2000	Asian Championships	Jakarta, Indonesia	1st	14.08 m
2000	Olympic Games	Sydney, Australia	21st (q)	13.50 m
2001	East Asian Games	Osaka, Japan	3rd	13.20 m
2001	World Championships	Edmonton, Canada	20th (q)	13.63 m
2002	Asian Championships	Colombo, Sri Lanka	3rd	13.11 m
2005	World Championships	Helsinki, Finland	–	NM
2005	Asian Championships	Incheon, South Korea	4th	13.45 m
2006	Asian Indoor Championships	Pattaya, Thailand	1st	13.91 m
2006	World Indoor Championships	Moscow, Russia	18th (q)	13.37 m
2006	Asian Games	Doha, Qatar	5th	13.54 m
2007	World Championships	Osaka, Japan	23rd (q)	13.52 m
2008	Asian Indoor Championships	Doha, Qatar	4th	13.30 m
2008	Olympic Games	Beijing, China	27th (q)	13.46 m
