= 1994 World Junior Championships in Athletics – Women's triple jump =

The women's triple jump event at the 1994 World Junior Championships in Athletics was held in Lisbon, Portugal, at Estádio Universitário de Lisboa on 20 and 21 July.

== Medalists ==
Gold	Yelena Lysak; Russia
Silver	Ren Ruiping; China
Bronze	Tatyana Lebedeva; Russia

== Results ==
=== Final ===
21 July

Rank	Name	Nationality	Attempts						Result	Notes
Rank	Name	Nationality	1	2	3	4	5	6	Result	Notes
1st place, gold medalist(s)	Yelena Lysak	Russia	x	14.43 w (w: +2.7 m/s)	13.90 (w: +1.3 m/s)	x	14.30 (w: +1.3 m/s)	14.31 (w: +0.9 m/s)	14.43 w (w: +2.7 m/s)	
2nd place, silver medalist(s)	Ren Ruiping	China	x	14.12 (w: +1.4 m/s)	14.36 w (w: +2.3 m/s)	14.34 (w: +1.7 m/s)	14.33 (w: +1.3 m/s)	x	14.36 w (w: +2.3 m/s)	
3rd place, bronze medalist(s)	Tatyana Lebedeva	Russia	13.12 (w: +1.9 m/s)	13.36 (w: +0.9 m/s)	13.40 w (w: +2.2 m/s)	13.62 (w: +0.7 m/s)	13.48 (w: +1.6 m/s)	13.48 w (w: +2.4 m/s)	13.62 (w: +0.7 m/s)	
4	Suzette Lee	Jamaica	13.20 (w: +1.2 m/s)	13.19 (w: +1.9 m/s)	13.41 (w: +1.7 m/s)	12.84 (w: +1.6 m/s)	13.14 (w: +0.1 m/s)	13.18 (w: +1.7 m/s)	13.41 (w: +1.7 m/s)	
5	Olga Cepero	Cuba	13.08 (w: +0.9 m/s)	13.19 (w: +1.5 m/s)	12.82 (w: +0.8 m/s)	12.84 (w: +1.2 m/s)	x	13.32 w (w: +2.7 m/s)	13.32 w (w: +2.7 m/s)	
6	Cosmina Boaja	Romania	x	12.98 (w: +1.7 m/s)	13.12 w (w: +2.2 m/s)	13.07 (w: +1.1 m/s)	12.86 w (w: +2.1 m/s)	13.05 (w: +1.9 m/s)	13.12 w (w: +2.2 m/s)	
7	Aneta Sadach	Poland	12.79 (w: +1.0 m/s)	12.86 (w: +1.9 m/s)	12.74 (w: +0.6 m/s)	12.98 (w: +1.5 m/s)	13.01 (w: +1.5 m/s)	12.91 w (w: +2.7 m/s)	13.01 (w: +1.5 m/s)	
8	Daniela Bologa	Romania	12.71 (w: +1.3 m/s)	12.57 (w: +0.8 m/s)	12.88 w (w: +2.1 m/s)	12.80 (w: +1.2 m/s)	x	x	12.88 w (w: +2.1 m/s)	
9	Magdelín Martínez	Cuba	12.55 (w: +1.3 m/s)	12.58 w (w: +2.1 m/s)	12.84 (w: +1.8 m/s)				12.84 (w: +1.8 m/s)	
10	Andreja Ribac	Slovenia	12.44 (w: +1.7 m/s)	12.51 (w: +1.4 m/s)	12.63 (w: +0.6 m/s)				12.63 (w: +0.6 m/s)	
11	Olga Voronina	Uzbekistan	12.43 (w: +1.1 m/s)	11.98 (w: +0.8 m/s)	12.54 (w: +2.0 m/s)				12.54 (w: +2.0 m/s)	
12	Nicole Mladenis	Australia	11.81 (w: +2.0 m/s)	12.48 w (w: +2.7 m/s)	12.52 (w: +1.6 m/s)				12.52 (w: +1.6 m/s)	

=== Qualifications ===
20 Jul

==== Group A ====
Rank	Name	Nationality	Attempts			Result	Notes
Rank	Name	Nationality	1	2	3	Result	Notes
1	Ren Ruiping	China	x	13.60 (w: +0.7 m/s)	-	13.60 (w: +0.7 m/s)	Q
2	Tatyana Lebedeva	Russia	13.19 (w: +1.7 m/s)	-	-	13.19 (w: +1.7 m/s)	Q
3	Magdelín Martínez	Cuba	12.98 (w: +1.1 m/s)	12.62 w (w: +2.2 m/s)	12.21 (w: +0.7 m/s)	12.98 (w: +1.1 m/s)	q
4	Cosmina Boaja	Romania	12.76 (w: +1.2 m/s)	12.91 (w: +1.4 m/s)	12.94 (w: +1.7 m/s)	12.94 (w: +1.7 m/s)	q
5	Olga Voronina	Uzbekistan	12.32 w (w: +2.5 m/s)	x	12.92 (w: +1.9 m/s)	12.92 (w: +1.9 m/s)	q
6	Andreja Ribac	Slovenia	x	12.89 (w: +1.1 m/s)	12.46 (w: +0.7 m/s)	12.89 (w: +1.1 m/s)	q
7	Alexandra Barlet	France	x	12.51 (w: +1.1 m/s)	x	12.51 (w: +1.1 m/s)	
8	Vlasta Gruberová	Czech Republic	12.41 w (w: +2.1 m/s)	x	x	12.41 w (w: +2.1 m/s)	
9	Christine Gulbrandsen	Norway	12.30 (w: +1.9 m/s)	12.15 (w: +1.2 m/s)	x	12.30 (w: +1.9 m/s)	
10	Nicole Herschmann	Germany	12.24 (w: +0.8 m/s)	12.23 (w: +1.1 m/s)	11.99 (w: +1.2 m/s)	12.24 (w: +0.8 m/s)	
11	Jamila Codrington	United States	x	x	12.21 w (w: +2.3 m/s)	12.21 w (w: +2.3 m/s)	
12	Rosa Bandini	Italy	x	12.16 (w: +1.9 m/s)	12.08 (w: +1.9 m/s)	12.16 (w: +1.9 m/s)	
13	Kim Hyo-In	South Korea	x	x	11.93 (w: +0.8 m/s)	11.93 (w: +0.8 m/s)	
14	Mirenda Francourt	Seychelles	x	x	11.68 (w: +0.2 m/s)	11.68 (w: +0.2 m/s)	
15	Diyana Penchc	Bosnia and Herzegovina	11.41 w (w: +2.2 m/s)	10.48 (w: +0.7 m/s)	11.26 (w: +1.2 m/s)	11.41 w (w: +2.2 m/s)	
16	Tatyana Dyatlova	Belarus	x	11.37 (w: 0.0 m/s)	x	11.37 (w: 0.0 m/s)	

==== Group B ====
Rank	Name	Nationality	Attempts			Result	Notes
Rank	Name	Nationality	1	2	3	Result	Notes
1	Yelena Lysak	Russia	13.84 (w: +0.1 m/s)	-	-	13.84 (w: +0.1 m/s)	Q
2	Suzette Lee	Jamaica	12.95 (w: +0.2 m/s)	12.82 (w: +0.4 m/s)	13.18 (w: +1.5 m/s)	13.18 (w: +1.5 m/s)	Q
3	Olga Cepero	Cuba	12.59 (w: +0.7 m/s)	12.92 (w: +0.1 m/s)	13.13 (w: +1.0 m/s)	13.13 (w: +1.0 m/s)	Q
4	Daniela Bologa	Romania	12.87 (w: +1.2 m/s)	12.99 (w: +1.0 m/s)	13.08 (w: +0.9 m/s)	13.08 (w: +0.9 m/s)	Q
5	Aneta Sadach	Poland	12.88 w (w: +2.9 m/s)	12.97 (w: +1.3 m/s)	x	12.97 (w: +1.3 m/s)	q
6	Nicole Mladenis	Australia	12.54 (w: +0.4 m/s)	12.94 w (w: +3.5 m/s)	x	12.94 w (w: +3.5 m/s)	q
7	Chukwuwete Olomina	Sweden	12.79 (w: +1.5 m/s)	12.67 (w: +0.6 m/s)	12.83 (w: +1.2 m/s)	12.83 (w: +1.2 m/s)	
8	Anja Valant	Slovenia	x	12.82 (w: +1.6 m/s)	12.65 w (w: +3.2 m/s)	12.82 (w: +1.6 m/s)	
9	Tereza Marinova	Bulgaria	x	12.82 (w: +0.8 m/s)	x	12.82 (w: +0.8 m/s)	
10	Nicole Gamble	United States	12.28 (w: +1.3 m/s)	12.55 (w: +0.6 m/s)	x	12.55 (w: +0.6 m/s)	
11	Cornelia Eigenherr	Germany	12.55 (w: +0.8 m/s)	x	12.24 (w: +1.3 m/s)	12.55 (w: +0.8 m/s)	
12	Elena Gilardoni	Italy	11.90 (w: +1.4 m/s)	x	12.25 (w: +1.5 m/s)	12.25 (w: +1.5 m/s)	
13	Barbara Cannet	France	x	12.25 (w: +1.5 m/s)	x	12.25 (w: +1.5 m/s)	
14	Oksana Eseulova	Moldova	x	12.14 (w: +1.2 m/s)	x	12.14 (w: +1.2 m/s)	
15	Adriana Matoso	Brazil	x	x	11.86 (w: 0.0 m/s)	11.86 (w: 0.0 m/s)	
16	Yang Xiaoli	China	x	11.70 (w: +0.8 m/s)	x	11.70 (w: +0.8 m/s)	

== Participation ==
According to an unofficial count, 32 athletes from 23 countries participated in the event.

- Australia (1)
- Belarus (1)
- Bosnia and Herzegovina (1)
- Brazil (1)
- Bulgaria (1)
- China (2)
- Cuba (2)
- Czech Republic (1)
- France (2)
- Germany (2)
- Italy (2)
- Jamaica (1)
- Moldova (1)
- Norway (1)
- Poland (1)
- Romania (2)
- Russia (2)
- Seychelles (1)
- Slovenia (2)
- South Korea (1)
- Sweden (1)
- United States (2)
- Uzbekistan (1)
