= Fumiyo Yoshida =

Japanese triple jumper

Personal information
- Nationality: Japanese
- Born: 25 April 1981 (age 45) Tako, Chiba, Japan
- Education: Chuo University
- Height: 1.60 m (5 ft 3 in)
- Weight: 53 kg (117 lb)

Sport
- Country: Japan
- Sport: Track and field
- Event: Triple jump

Achievements and titles
- Personal bests: Triple jump: 13.50 m (2003, 2007); Long jump: 6.07 m (2007)

Fumiyo Yoshida (吉田 文代, Yoshida Fumiyo; born 25 April 1981 in Tako, Chiba) is a Japanese triple jumper. She competed at the 2007 World Championships without reaching the final. She was a nine-time Japanese Championships triple jump champion.

== Domestic career ==
=== Japanese College Championships ===
Yoshida competed in the Japanese College Championships in 2001, 2002, and 2003, representing Chuo University. She won, taking the title in triple jump in all three appearances.

=== Japanese Championships ===
Yoshida competed in the Japanese Championships every year between 2002 and her retirement in 2016. She won the national title nine times, in 2003, 2005, 2006, 2007, 2008, 2009, 2010, 2012, and 2013. She came in second in 2002, 2004, and 2011.

2014 was the last year Yoshida competed in any event other than the Japan Championships, and that year she came in 4th. The next two years, the Japan Championships was the only event she competed in, and she came 7th and 11th. After the 2016 Championships, Yoshida retired from competition.

== International career ==
=== East Asian Games ===
Yoshida competed in the 1997 East Asian games in Busan, South Korea, at the age of just 16, coming 6th.

=== Asian Championships ===
Yoshida competed in the Asian Championships in 2002 in Colombo, Sri Lanka, in 2003 in Manila, Philippines, in 2005, in Incheon, South Korea, in 2007 in Amman, Jordan, and in 2009, in Guangzhou, China. In Manila in 2003, she competed in both Triple Jump and Long jump. Her best finish was 4th in Amman in 2007.

=== World Championships ===
Yoshida competed in the 2007 World Championships in Osaka, Japan, but failed to advance past the quarter finals.

== Personal bests ==
Event	Measure	Wind	Competition	Venue	Date
Triple jump	13.50 m	+0.4 m/s	Japanese Championships	Yokohama, Japan	6 June 2003
Triple jump	13.50 m	+1.0 m/s	Mikio Oda Memorial	Hiroshima, Japan	29 April 2007

== Records ==
In the 2005 East Japan Business Championships, Yoshida set a tournament record of 13.23m, which remained unbeaten until Mariko Morimoto managed a jump of 13.36 in the 2022 Campionships.

== International competition ==
Year	Competition	Venue	Position	Event	Measure
Representing Japan
1997	East Asian Games	Busan, South Korea	6th	Triple jump	13.20 (wind: +0.6 m/s)
2002	Asian Championships	Colombo, Sri Lanka	5th	Triple jump	12.66 (wind: -2.4 m/s)
2003	Asian Championships	Manila, Philippines	10th	Long jump	5.68 (wind: +0.8 m/s)
2003	Asian Championships	Manila, Philippines	7th	Triple jump	13.09
2005	Asian Championships	Incheon, South Korea	6th	Triple jump	13.20 (wind: +0.6 m/s)
2007	Asian Championships	Amman, Jordan	4th	Triple jump	13.31 (wind: +6.4 m/s)
2007	World Championships	Osaka, Japan	27th (qf)	Triple jump	12.62 (wind: 0.0 m/s)
2009	Asian Championships	Guangzhou, China	7th	Triple jump	12.73 (wind: +0.7 m/s)

== National title ==
- Japanese Championships
  - Triple jump: 2003, 2005, 2006, 2007, 2008, 2009, 2010, 2012, 2013

== Personal life ==
Yoshida started working as a High School teacher in 2013.
