= Athletics at the 2001 Summer Universiade – Women's triple jump =

The women's triple jump event at the 2001 Summer Universiade was held at the Workers Stadium in Beijing, China on 1 September.

== Results ==
Rank	Athlete	Nationality	Result	Notes
1st place, gold medalist(s)	Tatyana Lebedeva	Russia	14.81	UR
2nd place, silver medalist(s)	Natallia Safronava	Belarus	14.57	
3rd place, bronze medalist(s)	Yelena Oleynikova	Russia	14.39w	
4	Yuliana Pérez	United States	14.29	
5	Wu Lingmei	China	13.99	
6	Katja Umlauft	Germany	13.93	
7	Zita Ajkler	Hungary	13.69	
8	Adelina Gavrilă	Romania	13.65	
9	Nicole Herschmann	Germany	13.58	
10	Dimitra Markou	Greece	13.52	
11	Carlota Castrejana	Spain	13.38	
12	Virginia Miller	United States	13.38	
13	Wang Kuo-hui	Chinese Taipei	13.06	
	Lara Gerada	Malta	DNS	
	Rania Estephan	Lebanon	DNS	
	Maurren Maggi	Brazil	DNS	
