= 2002 European Athletics Indoor Championships – Women's long jump =

The women's long jump event at the 2002 European Athletics Indoor Championships was held on March 3.

== Results ==
Rank	Athlete	Nationality	#1	#2	#3	#4	#5	#6	Result	Note
1st place, gold medalist(s)	Niki Xanthou	Greece	X	6.20	6.61	X	6.65	6.74	6.74	
2nd place, silver medalist(s)	Olga Rublyova	Russia	6.24	6.59	X	X	6.59	6.74	6.74	
3rd place, bronze medalist(s)	Lyudmila Galkina	Russia	6.49	X	6.63	X	6.38	6.68	6.68	
4	Irina Simagina	Russia	6.55	6.64	6.61	6.29	X	6.40	6.64	
5	Stiliani Pilatou	Greece	6.57	X	X	6.25	X	6.40	6.57	
6	Zita Ajkler	Hungary	6.25	6.47	6.45	X	6.48	X	6.48	
7	Lucie Komrsková	Czech Republic	X	X	6.40	6.32	5.97	6.44	6.44	
8	Antonia Yordanova	Bulgaria	6.19	6.33	6.43	X	6.30	6.25	6.43	
9	Concepción Montaner	Spain	6.37	X	6.38				6.38	
10	Carlota Castrejana	Spain	5.99	6.23	5.89				6.23	
	Anila Meta	Albania							DNS	
