= Athletics at the 1999 Summer Universiade – Women's triple jump =

The women's triple jump event at the 1999 Summer Universiade was held on 9 and 11 July at the Estadio Son Moix in Palma de Mallorca, Spain.

== Medalists ==
Gold	Silver	Bronze
Olena Hovorova; Ukraine	Wu Lingmei; China	Adelina Gavrilă; Romania

== Results ==
=== Qualification ===
Qualification: 13.80 (Q) or at least 12 best performers (q) advance to the final

Rank	Group	Athlete	Nationality	#1	#2	#3	Result	Notes
1	B	Adelina Gavrilă	Romania				14.32w	Q
2	B	Baya Rahouli	Algeria				14.13	Q
3	B	Olena Hovorova	Ukraine				14.07	Q
4	B	Miao Chunqing	China				14.02	Q
5	B	Anja Valant	Slovenia				13.95	Q
6	A	Natallia Safronava	Belarus				13.93	Q
7	A	Stacey Bowers	United States				13.90	Q
8	A	Wu Lingmei	China				13.84	Q
9	A	Barbara Lah	Italy				13.83	Q
10	B	Carlota Castrejana	Spain	13.68	x	13.82	13.82	q
11	A	Zita Bálint	Hungary				13.81	q
12	A	Tatyana Drozdova	Russia				13.68	q
13	B	Olga Cepero	Cuba				13.59	
14	B	Maho Hanaoka	Japan				13.28	
15	A	Katja Umlauft	Germany				13.17	
16	A	Chantal Ouoba	Burkina Faso				12.15	
17	B	Tshoseletso Nkala	Botswana				11.65	
18	B	Greta Mubvumbi	Zimbabwe				10.11	
	A	Wang Kuo-hui	Chinese Taipei				NM	
	B	Ericka Varillas	Peru				NM	
	A	Lisbeth Bertelsen	Denmark				DNS	

=== Final ===
Rank	Athlete	Nationality	#1	#2	#3	#4	#5	#6	Result	Notes
1st place, gold medalist(s)	Olena Hovorova	Ukraine	x	14.99w	14.59	x	x	14.30w	14.99 w	UR
2nd place, silver medalist(s)	Wu Lingmei	China	14.55w	14.20w	13.62	14.47w	14.27w	13.60	14.55 w	
3rd place, bronze medalist(s)	Adelina Gavrilă	Romania	14.22	x	14.26	14.20	14.33	x	14.33	
4	Baya Rahouli	Algeria							14.22 w	
5	Natallia Safronava	Belarus							14.21 w	
6	Barbara Lah	Italy							14.05 w	
7	Anja Valant	Slovenia							13.92 w	
8	Miao Chunqing	China							13.81 w	
9	Stacey Bowers	United States							13.80	
10	Tatyana Drozdova	Russia							13.58 w	
11	Carlota Castrejana	Spain	13.16	12.93	13.37				13.37	
	Zita Bálint	Hungary							DNS	
