= Concepción Montaner =

Spanish long jumper (born 1981)

Concha Montaner
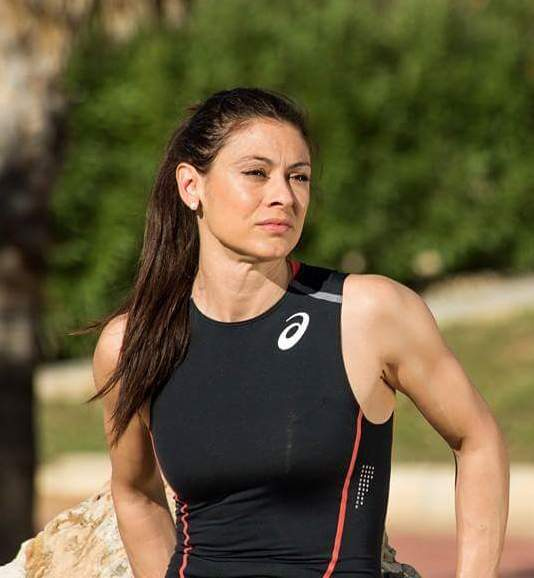
- Montaner in 2016

Personal information
- Nationality: Spanish
- Born: Concepción Montaner Coll; 14 January 1981 (age 45) L'Eliana, Spain
- Height: 1.72 m (5 ft 8 in)
- Weight: 59 kg (130 lb)

Sport
- Sport: Track and field
- Event: Long jump

Concepción "Concha" Montaner Coll (born 14 January 1981) is a Spanish track and field athlete who specializes in long jump.

Montaner took the gold medal the World Junior Championships in 2000. At the 2006 World Indoor Championships she won her first major international senior medal when she finished third with 6.76 metres - the same result as the silver medalist Naide Gomes. Gomes beat Montaner on countback, due to a longer next best jump. In 2007 Montaner won the silver medal at the European Indoor Championships, behind Gomes.

Montaner's personal best jump is 6.92 metres, achieved in July 2005 in Madrid.

Montaner is also a national indoor champion over 60 metres.

== Achievements ==
| Year | Competition | Venue | Position | Event | Notes |
Representing Spain
| 1998 | World Junior Championships | Annecy, France | 10th (h) | 4 × 100 m relay | 47.17 |
| 1999 | European Junior Championships | Riga, Latvia | 2nd | Long jump | 6.39 m |
| 2000 | European Indoor Championships | Ghent, Belgium | 16th (q) | Long jump | 6.11 m |
| 2000 | World Junior Championships | Santiago, Chile | 1st | Long jump | 6.47 m (wind: +0.6 m/s) |
| 2000 | Olympic Games | Sydney, Australia | – | Long jump | NM |
| 2001 | European U23 Championships | Amsterdam, Netherlands | 2nd | Long jump | 6.46 m (wind: -0.5 m/s) |
| 2001 | Mediterranean Games | Radès, Tunisia | 4th | 4 × 100 m relay | 47.64 m |
| 2001 | Mediterranean Games | Radès, Tunisia | 1st | Long jump | 6.48 m |
| 2002 | European Indoor Championships | Vienna, Austria | 9th | Long jump | 6.38 m |
| 2002 | European Championships | Munich, Germany | 4th | Long jump | 6.67 m |
| 2002 | European Championships | Munich, Germany | 10th (h) | 4 × 100 m relay | 44.32 |
| 2002 | World Cup | Madrid, Spain | 3rd | Long jump | 6.68 m |
| 2003 | World Indoor Championships | Birmingham, United Kingdom | 9th | Long jump | 6.34 m |
| 2003 | World Championships | Paris, France | 12th | Long jump | 6.37 m |
| 2003 | World Athletics Final | Monte Carlo, Monaco | 7th | Long jump | 6.45 m |
| 2004 | World Indoor Championships | Budapest, Hungary | 7th | Long jump | 6.46 m |
| 2004 | Ibero-American Championships | Huelva, Spain | 3rd | Long jump | 6.40 m |
| 2005 | European Indoor Championships | Madrid, Spain | 19th (q) | Long jump | 6.19 m |
| 2005 | Mediterranean Games | Almería, Spain | 3rd | Long jump | 6.49 m |
| 2005 | World Championships | Helsinki, Finland | 11th | Long jump | 6.32 m |
| 2006 | World Indoor Championships | Moscow, Russia | 3rd | Long jump | 6.76 m |
| 2006 | European Championships | Gothenburg, Sweden | 13th (q) | Long jump | 6.49 m |
| 2007 | European Indoor Championships | Birmingham, United Kingdom | 2nd | Long jump | 6.69 m |
| 2007 | World Championships | Osaka, Japan | 15th (q) | Long jump | 7.55 m |
| 2008 | World Indoor Championships | Valencia, Spain | 5th | Long jump | 6.57 m |
| 2008 | Olympic Games | Beijing, China | 15th (q) | Long jump | 6.53 m |
| 2010 | Ibero-American Championships | San Fernando, Spain | 1st | Long jump | 6.45 m |
| 2010 | European Championships | Barcelona, Spain | 22nd (q) | Long jump | 6.34 m |
| 2011 | European Indoor Championships | Paris, France | 12th (q) | Long jump | 6.47 m |
| 2011 | World Championships | Daegu, South Korea | – | Long jump | NM |
| 2011 | World Championships | Daegu, South Korea | 17th (h) | 4 × 100 m relay | 46.24 |
| 2012 | World Indoor Championships | Istanbul, Turkey | 15th (q) | Long jump | 6.37 m |
| 2012 | European Championships | Helsinki, Finland | 10th | Long jump | 6.26 m |
| 2012 | Olympic Games | London, United Kingdom | 19th | Long jump | 6.30 m |
| 2016 | Olympic Games | Rio de Janeiro, Brazil | 24th (q) | Long jump | 6.32 m |
