= Olena Shekhovtsova =

Ukrainian long jumper (born 1972)

Personal information
- Born: 31 May 1972 (age 54) Kyiv, Soviet Union

Sport
- Sport: Track and field
Medal record
Representing Ukraine
Summer Universiade
Gold medal – first place	1997 Catania	Long jump
Gold medal – first place	1999 Palma de Mallorca	Long jump

Olena Shekhovtsova (born 31 May 1972) is a retired Ukrainian long jumper. Her personal best jump is 6.97 metres, achieved at the 1996 Olympic Games in Atlanta.

== Achievements ==
Year	Competition	Venue	Position	Notes
Representing the Ukraine
1996	Olympic Games	Atlanta, United States	5th	6.97 m
1997	World Championships	Athens, Greece	14th (q)	6.52 m
1997	Universiade	Catania, Italy	1st	6.78 m
1998	European Championships	Budapest, Hungary	16th (q)	6.46 m
1999	Universiade	Palma, Spain	1st	6.92 m
1999	World Championships	Seville, Spain	24th (q)	6.39 m
2000	European Indoor Championships	Ghent, Belgium	7th	6.56 m
2000	Olympic Games	Sydney, Australia	11th	6.37 m
2001	World Indoor Championships	Lisbon, Portugal	11th	6.32 m
