= Zita Ajkler =

Hungarian long jumper (born 1975)

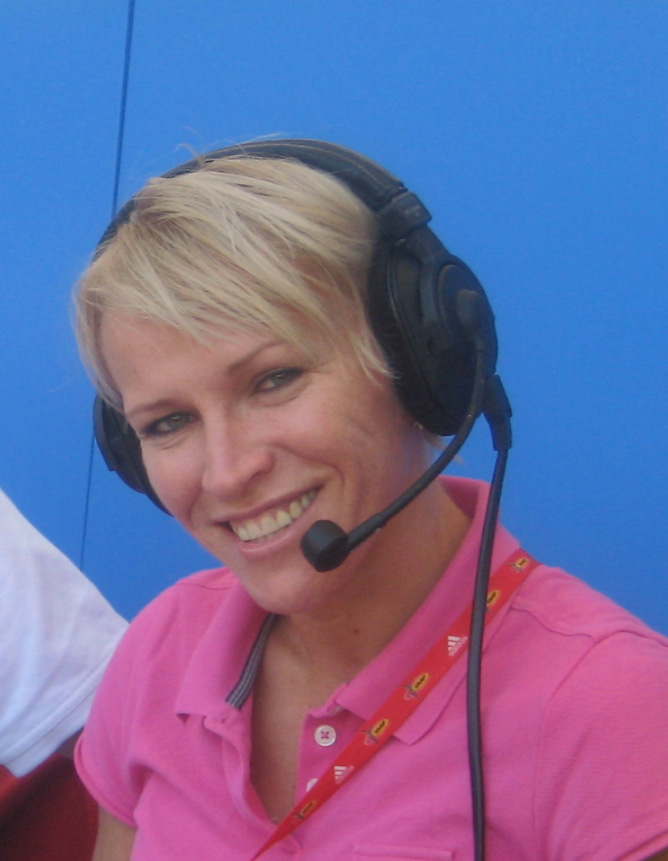
- Ajkler working as a commentator at the 2010 European Athletics Championships

Personal information
- Nationality: Hungarian
- Born: Pásztó, Nógrád County, Hungary
- Occupation: Sports commentator
- Employer: Eurosport

Sport
- Country: Hungary
- Sport: Long jump
- Retired: 2010/2014
Medal record
Representing Hungary
Summer Universiade
Bronze medal – third place	2003 Daegu	Long jump

Zita Ajkler (born 9 June 1975) is a Hungarian long jumper. She is a 16-time Hungarian national champion in the long jump, triple jump, heptathlon, and 100-meter hurdles. Her personal best is 676 cm in the long jump and 13.99 m in the triple jump (the national record is 14.00 m); 13.75 s in 100-meter hurdles (wind-1.2), 8.35 s in 60-meter hurdles, and 5,323 points in the heptathlon.

== Career ==
=== Early years and pole vault ===
Ajkler began by pole vaulting recreationally, achieved 360 cm in training after three months of practice, but never competed in this event. She also participated in the television game show Jeux sans frontières in 1994.

=== Long jump ===
Her first big achievement was in 1998, at the European Athletics Championships in Budapest, where she came in 6th with a personal best of 664 cm. She reached 6th place again in Vienna at the indoor European Athletics Championships in 2002. Ajkler has competed during two Olympic Games: Sydney 2000 and Athens 2004; she did not reach the finals, however.

Ajkler competed three times at the Summer Universiade: 1999 - Mallorca, 2001 - Beijing, and 2003 - Daegu (long jump, triple jump, and 4X100-meter relay in all competitions). She reached the finals (top 8) in all events. Her best result was winning 3rd in 2003 in the long jump. Her worst result was getting 7th place in 2001, triple jump.

In 2004 she injured her left foot before the Games and couldn't recover for 18 months. She started to train once more in 2005. Four days before her first competition in January 2006, she broke her right ankle. She couldn't return with full health after two surgeries at the end of 2007, but still tried to reach the Olympic qualification level in 2008. This was set at 665 cm but Ajkler only jumped 645 cm, thus missing her third chance at the Olympics.

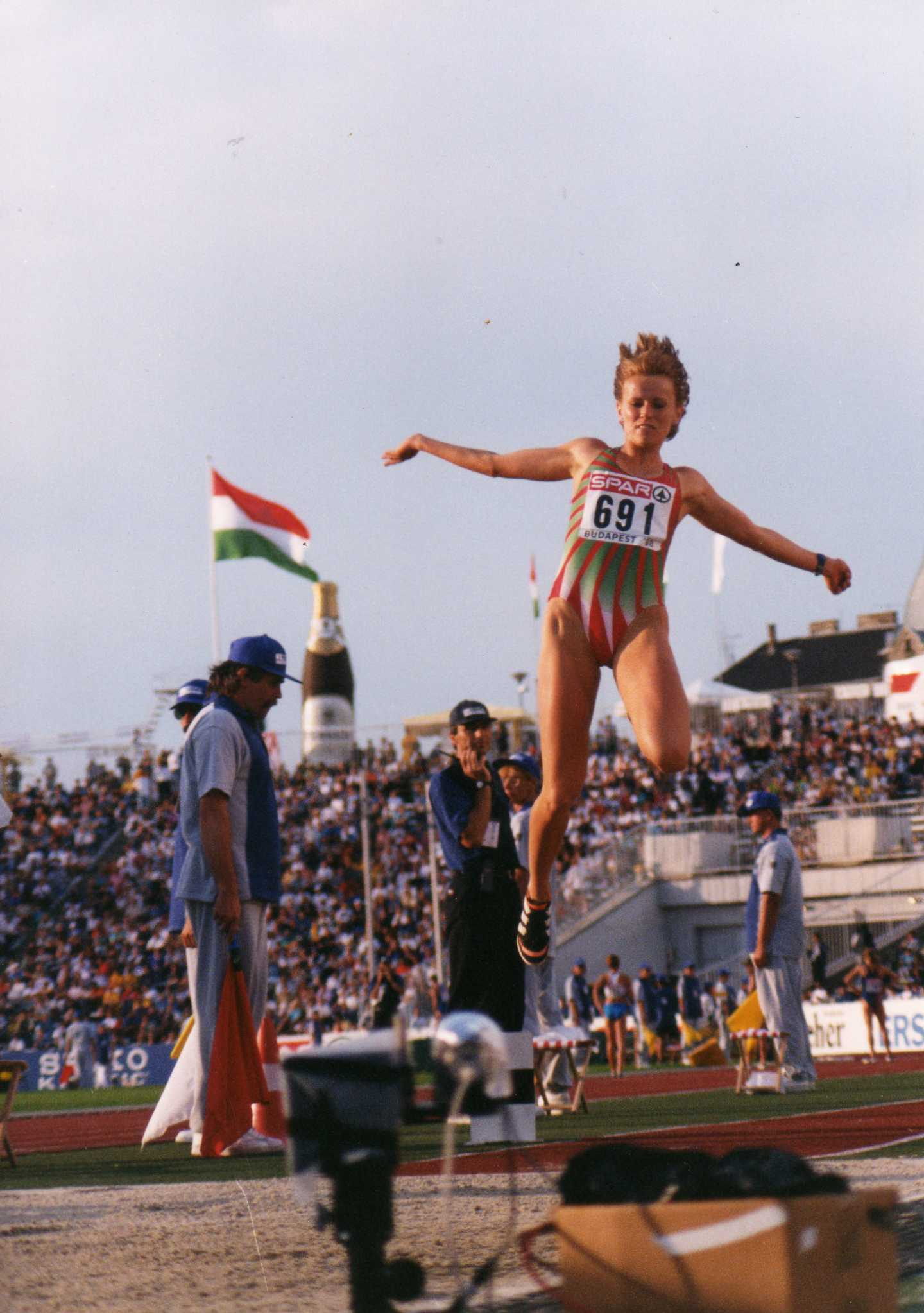
Zita Ajkler competes at the 1998 European Athletics Championships in Budapest

In 2010, Ajkler won the European Masters Championships in Nyíregyháza in the triple jump and came 2nd in the long jump. She retired from competing but returned and competed for the last time in 2014 at the indoor World Masters Championships in Budapest. She won in the triple jump as well as in the long jump. Following this, she ended her sport career as a track and field athlete.

=== Post-competitive career ===
Ajkler now works for television sports network Eurosport in Hungary. She is a commentator for track and field, figure skating, and extreme sports. She is also a physical conditioning and coordination coach, helping the national women's sabre team.

== Achievements ==
Year	Competition	Venue	Position	Event	Notes
Representing Hungary
1998	European Championships	Budapest, Hungary	6th	Long jump	6.64 m
1999	Universiade	Palma de Mallorca, Spain	5th	Long jump	6.46 m
2000	European Indoor Championships	Ghent, Belgium	12th (q)	Long jump	6.29 m
2000	Olympic Games	Sydney, Australia	24th (q)	Long jump	6.36 m
2001	Universiade	Beijing, China	4th	Long jump	6.51 m
2001	Universiade	Beijing, China	7th	Triple jump	13.69 m
2002	European Indoor Championships	Vienna, Austria	6th	Long jump	6.48 m
2002	European Indoor Championships	Vienna, Austria	21st (q)	Triple jump	13.34 m
2002	European Championships	Munich, Germany	15th (q)	Long jump	6.16 m
2003	Universiade	Daegu, South Korea	3rd	Long jump	6.38 m
2003	Universiade	Daegu, South Korea	6th	Triple jump	13.42 m
2004	World Indoor Championships	Budapest, Hungary	16th (q)	Long jump	6.44 m
2004	Olympic Games	Athens, Greece	26th (q)	Long jump	6.39 m
2006	European Championships	Gothenburg, Sweden	23rd (q)	Triple jump	12.42 m

=== Personal bests ===
- Triple jump - 13.99 m (2002)
- Long jump - 6.76 m (2004)
