= Athletics at the 1998 Asian Games – Women's triple jump =

Women's triple jump at the 1998 Asian Games
- Venue: Thammasat Stadium
- Dates: 18 December 1998
- Competitors: 15 from 11 nations

Medalists
gold medal	Ren Ruiping	China
silver medal	Wu Lingmei	China
bronze medal	Wiktoriýa Brigadnaýa	Turkmenistan

The women's triple jump competition at the 1998 Asian Games in Bangkok, Thailand was held on 18 December at the Thammasat Stadium. It was the first time that this event was contested at the Asian Games.

== Schedule ==
All times are Indochina Time (UTC+07:00)

Date	Time	Event
Friday, 18 December 1998	14:00	Final

== Results ==
Rank	Athlete	Result	Notes
1st place, gold medalist(s)	Ren Ruiping (CHN)	14.27	GR
2nd place, silver medalist(s)	Wu Lingmei (CHN)	14.25	
3rd place, bronze medalist(s)	Wiktoriýa Brigadnaýa (TKM)	13.66	
4	Anna Tarasova (KAZ)	13.55	
5	Yelena Pershina (KAZ)	13.43	
6	Wang Kuo-hui (TPE)	13.25	
7	Maho Hanaoka (JPN)	13.23	
8	Sunisa Kawrungruang (THA)	13.11	
9	Lekha Thomas (IND)	13.05	
10	Ri Yong-ae (PRK)	12.89	
11	Nguyễn Bích Vân (VIE)	12.88	
12	Hsu Pei-ching (TPE)	12.83	
13	Nyoman Rai Trisandiana (INA)	12.72	
14	Wacharee Ritthiwat (THA)	12.26	
15	Tatyana Efimenko (KGZ)	12.01	
