= Athletics at the 1999 Pan American Games – Women's long jump =

Women's long jump at the Pan American Games

The women's long jump event at the 1999 Pan American Games was held on July 24.

== Results ==
Rank	Name	Nationality	#1	#2	#3	#4	#5	#6	Result	Notes
1st place, gold medalist(s)	Maurren Maggi	Brazil	6.56	6.42	6.53	6.51	6.59	6.57	6.59	
2nd place, silver medalist(s)	Angela Brown	United States	6.30	6.44	6.16	6.35	6.51	6.37	6.51	
3rd place, bronze medalist(s)	Elva Goulbourne	Jamaica	6.17	6.28	6.41	6.23	6.24	x	6.41	
4	Vanessa Monar-Enweani	Canada	6.37	5.93	x	x	6.18	6.23	6.37	
5	LaShonda Christopher	United States	x	6.30	6.08	4.82	x	x	6.30	
6	Lissete Cuza	Cuba	x	6.29	x	x	6.25	6.21	6.29	
7	Jackie Edwards	Bahamas	6.03	6.06	6.20	6.10	6.06	6.20	6.20	
8	Flora Hyacinth	United States Virgin Islands	6.18	x	x	x	x	x	6.18	
9	Luciana dos Santos	Brazil	x	6.13	x				6.13	
10	Mónica Falcioni	Uruguay	5.88	6.03	5.96				6.03	
11	Andrea Ávila	Argentina	5.95	6.03	x				6.03	
12	Gilda Massa	Peru	5.99	5.90	5.82				5.99	
13	Michelle Baptiste	Saint Lucia	5.72	5.92	5.66				5.92	
