= 1994 World Junior Championships in Athletics – Women's long jump =

The women's long jump event at the 1994 World Junior Championships in Athletics was held in Lisbon, Portugal, at Estádio Universitário de Lisboa on 22 and 23 July.

== Medalists ==
Gold	Yelena Lysak; Russia
Silver	Heli Koivula; Finland
Bronze	Ingvild Larsen; Norway

== Results ==
=== Final ===
23 July

Rank	Name	Nationality	Attempts						Result	Notes
Rank	Name	Nationality	1	2	3	4	5	6	Result	Notes
1st place, gold medalist(s)	Yelena Lysak	Russia	6.39 (w: +1.6 m/s)	6.45 (w: +0.7 m/s)	6.72 w (w: +4.5 m/s)	6.60 w (w: +3.5 m/s)	x	6.51 w (w: +3.9 m/s)	6.72 w (w: +4.5 m/s)	
2nd place, silver medalist(s)	Heli Koivula	Finland	6.38 (w: +0.7 m/s)	x	x	x	6.64 w (w: +3.2 m/s)	6.33 (w: +0.6 m/s)	6.64 w (w: +3.2 m/s)	
3rd place, bronze medalist(s)	Ingvild Larsen	Norway	6.39 w (w: +2.1 m/s)	6.07 (w: +0.8 m/s)	5.24 (w: +1.8 m/s)	5.80 (w: +0.6 m/s)	5.91 (w: +1.5 m/s)	6.37 w (w: +2.5 m/s)	6.39 w (w: +2.1 m/s)	
4	Magdalena Khristova	Bulgaria	x	6.29 (w: +1.1 m/s)	6.05 (w: +1.7 m/s)	6.35 w (w: +3.6 m/s)	6.33 w (w: +2.2 m/s)	6.39 w (w: +3.5 m/s)	6.39 w (w: +3.5 m/s)	
5	Kirsten Bolm	Germany	6.33 w (w: +2.3 m/s)	6.04 (w: +1.9 m/s)	1.58 w (w: +2.4 m/s)	6.21 (w: +1.8 m/s)	-	6.23 w (w: +2.1 m/s)	6.33 w (w: +2.3 m/s)	
6	Franziska Hofmann	Switzerland	6.32 (w: +1.2 m/s)	6.13 (w: +0.9 m/s)	6.25 w (w: +2.5 m/s)	6.30 w (w: +2.1 m/s)	6.18 w (w: +2.9 m/s)	6.01 w (w: +2.5 m/s)	6.32 (w: +1.2 m/s)	
7	Angela Henry	United States	6.27 (w: +1.6 m/s)	6.23 (w: +1.0 m/s)	6.10 w (w: +2.5 m/s)	6.18 (w: +1.7 m/s)	6.19 (w: +0.4 m/s)	6.26 w (w: +2.1 m/s)	6.27 (w: +1.6 m/s)	
8	Lacena Golding	Jamaica	x	6.27 (w: +1.7 m/s)	6.18 (w: +1.5 m/s)	5.85 (w: +1.2 m/s)	6.11 (w: +0.4 m/s)	6.26 w (w: +2.8 m/s)	6.27 (w: +1.7 m/s)	
9	Cristina Nicolau	Romania	6.13 (w: +1.5 m/s)	6.27 (w: +1.9 m/s)	6.20 (w: +2.0 m/s)	6.21 (w: +0.4 m/s)	6.25 (w: +1.3 m/s)	x	6.27 (w: +1.9 m/s)	
10	Tatyana Lebedeva	Russia	5.94 (w: +0.6 m/s)	6.22 (w: +1.9 m/s)	6.22 w (w: +2.1 m/s)				6.22 (w: +1.9 m/s)	
11	Trecia Smith	Jamaica	x	5.96 (w: +1.4 m/s)	6.12 w (w: +3.1 m/s)				6.12 w (w: +3.1 m/s)	
12	Peng Fengmei	China	5.87 (w: +1.7 m/s)	6.07 (w: +1.9 m/s)	5.97 (w: +1.7 m/s)				6.07 (w: +1.9 m/s)	

=== Qualifications ===
22 Jul

==== Group A ====
Rank	Name	Nationality	Attempts			Result	Notes
Rank	Name	Nationality	1	2	3	Result	Notes
1	Heli Koivula	Finland	6.33 (w: 0.0 m/s)	-	-	6.33 (w: 0.0 m/s)	Q
2	Lacena Golding	Jamaica	6.30 (w: +1.6 m/s)	-	-	6.30 (w: +1.6 m/s)	Q
3	Tatyana Lebedeva	Russia	x	6.28 (w: +1.2 m/s)	-	6.28 (w: +1.2 m/s)	Q
4	Angela Henry	United States	6.12 (w: +0.6 m/s)	6.19 (w: +1.3 m/s)	x	6.19 (w: +1.3 m/s)	q
5	Stephanie Hort	Germany	x	4.51 (w: +0.4 m/s)	6.18 (w: +1.6 m/s)	6.18 (w: +1.6 m/s)	
6	Lissette Cuza	Cuba	x	5.82 (w: +0.7 m/s)	5.96 (w: +1.0 m/s)	5.96 (w: +1.0 m/s)	
7	Zhasmina Nikolova	Bulgaria	5.70 (w: +1.4 m/s)	x	5.90 (w: +1.6 m/s)	5.90 (w: +1.6 m/s)	
8	Marcela Umnik	Slovenia	x	5.35 w (w: +2.6 m/s)	5.84 (w: +1.1 m/s)	5.84 (w: +1.1 m/s)	
9	Endurance Ojokolo	Nigeria	5.64 (w: +0.8 m/s)	5.63 (w: +0.6 m/s)	-	5.64 (w: +0.8 m/s)	
10	Ana Caicedo	Ecuador	5.41 (w: +0.5 m/s)	5.57 (w: +0.8 m/s)	5.22 (w: +0.5 m/s)	5.57 (w: +0.8 m/s)	
11	Tatyana Dyatlova	Belarus	5.23 (w: +1.2 m/s)	5.32 (w: +1.1 m/s)	x	5.32 (w: +1.1 m/s)	
12	Salimata Sylla	Mali	4.87 (w: +1.0 m/s)	5.04 (w: -0.1 m/s)	4.54 (w: +1.3 m/s)	5.04 (w: -0.1 m/s)	
13	Nomcebo Hlatshwayo	Swaziland	4.58 (w: +1.2 m/s)	4.29 (w: +0.2 m/s)	4.90 (w: +1.8 m/s)	4.90 (w: +1.8 m/s)	

==== Group B ====
Rank	Name	Nationality	Attempts			Result	Notes
Rank	Name	Nationality	1	2	3	Result	Notes
1	Trecia Smith	Jamaica	x	6.38 (w: +1.3 m/s)	-	6.38 (w: +1.3 m/s)	Q
2	Yelena Lysak	Russia	6.19 (w: +1.5 m/s)	6.31 (w: +1.4 m/s)	-	6.31 (w: +1.4 m/s)	Q
3	Peng Fengmei	China	6.10 (w: +0.2 m/s)	6.24 (w: +0.8 m/s)	6.29 (w: +1.1 m/s)	6.29 (w: +1.1 m/s)	Q
4	Kirsten Bolm	Germany	x	6.28 (w: +0.9 m/s)	-	6.28 (w: +0.9 m/s)	Q
5	Ingvild Larsen	Norway	6.26 (w: +1.6 m/s)	-	-	6.26 (w: +1.6 m/s)	Q
5	Franziska Hofmann	Switzerland	6.26 (w: +1.2 m/s)	-	-	6.26 (w: +1.2 m/s)	Q
7	Magdalena Khristova	Bulgaria	6.24 (w: +1.1 m/s)	6.23 w (w: +2.3 m/s)	6.11 (w: +0.7 m/s)	6.24 (w: +1.1 m/s)	q
8	Cristina Nicolau	Romania	6.23 (w: +0.5 m/s)	6.22 (w: +0.4 m/s)	x	6.23 (w: +0.5 m/s)	q
9	Marika Demestiha	Greece	5.97 (w: +1.0 m/s)	6.17 (w: +0.4 m/s)	5.90 (w: +1.3 m/s)	6.17 (w: +0.4 m/s)	
10	Johanna Halkoaho	Finland	x	x	6.01 (w: +1.8 m/s)	6.01 (w: +1.8 m/s)	
11	Angela Brown	United States	5.85 (w: +0.2 m/s)	x	x	5.85 (w: +0.2 m/s)	
12	Gilda Massa	Peru	x	3.76 (w: +0.9 m/s)	-	3.76 (w: +0.9 m/s)	

== Participation ==
According to an unofficial count, 25 athletes from 19 countries participated in the event.

- Belarus (1)
- Bulgaria (2)
- China (1)
- Cuba (1)
- Ecuador (1)
- Finland (2)
- Germany (2)
- Greece (1)
- Jamaica (2)
- Mali (1)
- Nigeria (1)
- Norway (1)
- Peru (1)
- Romania (1)
- Russia (2)
- Slovenia (1)
- Swaziland (1)
- Switzerland (1)
- United States (2)
