= Stiliani Pilatou =

Greek long jumper

Medal record

Women's athletics

Representing Greece

European Indoor Championships
Silver medal – second place	2005 Madrid	Long jump

Stiliani "Stella" Pilatou (Greek: Στυλιανή "Στέλλα" Πιλάτου, born 28 March 1980 in Heraklion) is a Greek long jumper.

Her personal best jump is 6.75 metres, achieved in July 2002 in Volos. This places her fourth in the all-time Greek performers list, behind Niki Xanthou, Paraskevi Tsiamita and Hrysopiyi Devetzi. Pilatou has a better indoor personal best with 6.80 metres.

== Competition record ==
Year	Competition	Venue	Position	Notes
Representing Greece
1999	European Junior Championships	Riga, Latvia	16th (q)	5.83 m
2001	European U23 Championships	Amsterdam, Netherlands	7th	6.06 m (wind: 0.8 m/s)
2001	Universiade	Beijing, China	5th	6.48 m
2001	Mediterranean Games	Radès, Tunisia	2nd	6.41 m
2002	European Indoor Championships	Vienna, Austria	5th	6.57 m
2002	European Championships	Munich, Germany	6th	6.58 m
2003	World Indoor Championships	Birmingham, United Kingdom	6th	6.47 m
2003	World Championships	Paris, France	21st (q)	6.21 m
2004	World Indoor Championships	Budapest, Hungary	9th (q)	6.53 m
2004	Olympic Games	Athens, Greece	23rd (q)	6.42 m
2005	European Indoor Championships	Madrid, Spain	2nd	6.64 m
2006	World Indoor Championships	Moscow, Russia	8th	6.50 m
2007	Universiade	Bangkok, Thailand	3rd	6.52 m
