= Wu Lingmei =

Chinese triple jumper

Personal information
- Born: 16 February 1973 (age 53) Guangzhou, China

Sport
- Sport: Track and field
Medal record
Representing China
Asian Games
Silver medal – second place	1998 Bangkok	Triple jump
Asian Championships
Gold medal – first place	2002 Colombo	Triple jump
Silver medal – second place	1995 Jakarta	Triple jump
Summer Universiade
Silver medal – second place	1999 Palma de Mallorca	Triple jump

Wu Lingmei (born 16 February 1973) is a Chinese triple jumper.

She won various silver medals at the 1998 Asian Games and the 1999 Summer Universiade. She became the Asian champion in 2002.

Her personal best jump was 14.39 metres, achieved in June 1998 in Beijing.

== Competition record ==
Year	Competition	Venue	Position	Event	Notes
Representing China
1995	Asian Championships	Jakarta, Indonesia	2nd	Triple jump	13.81 m
1995	World Championships	Gothenburg, Sweden	23rd (q)	Triple jump	13.43 m
1998	Asian Games	Bangkok, Thailand	2nd	Triple jump	14.25 m
1999	Universiade	Palma de Mallorca, Spain	2nd	Triple jump	14.55 m (w)
1999	World Championships	Seville, Spain	20th (q)	Triple jump	13.83 m
2001	Universiade	Beijing, China	5th	Triple jump	13.99 m
2002	Asian Championships	Colombo, Sri Lanka	1st	Triple jump	13.83 m
