= Athletics at the 1995 Summer Universiade – Women's long jump =

The women's long jump event at the 1995 Summer Universiade was held on 30–31 August at the Hakatanomori Athletic Stadium in Fukuoka, Japan.

== Medalists ==
Gold	Silver	Bronze
Viktoriya Vershynina; Ukraine	Sharon Jaklofsky; Netherlands	Lyudmila Galkina; Russia

== Results ==
=== Qualification ===
Qualification: 6.20 m (Q) or at least 12 best (q) qualified for the final.

Rank	Group	Athlete	Nationality	#1	#2	#3	Result	Notes
1	B	Viktoriya Vershynina	Ukraine	6.63			6.63	Q
2	A	Sharon Jaklofsky	Netherlands	6.56			6.56	Q
3	A	Pat Itanyi	Nigeria	6.49w			6.49w	Q
4	B	Ulrike Holzner	Germany	6.17	6.36		6.36	Q
5	B	Lyudmila Galkina	Russia	6.05	6.28		6.28	Q
6	A	Silvija Babić	Croatia	5.99	6.15	–	6.15	q
7	A	Dayana Etchenique	Spain	x	6.12	x	6.12	q
8	A	Shizuyo Nagashima	Japan	5.68	x	6.07	6.07	q
9	B	Rowena Welford	New Zealand	5.99	5.80	x	5.99	q
10	B	Luciana dos Santos	Brazil	5.92	x	5.75	5.92	q
11	A	Frith Maunder	New Zealand	5.68	5.92	x	5.92	q
12	A	Tracy Dulmage	Canada	5.72	5.90	5.69	5.90	q
13	A	Christina Athanasiou	Greece	x	x	5.84w	5.84w	
14	B	Kelly Dinsmore	Canada	5.80	x	x	5.80	
15	B	Maho Hanaoka	Japan	5.77	x	5.74	5.77	
16	A	Iliana Ilieva	Bulgaria	5.60	x	5.73	5.73	
17	A	Chantal Ouoba	Burkina Faso	5.64	5.48	5.38	5.64	
18	B	Nguyen Thi Diem Thuong	Vietnam	x	5.54	5.20	5.54	
19	A	Ng Sou Peng	Macau	5.04	5.16	4.88	5.16	
20	B	Moré Galetovic	Bolivia	4.23	5.14	5.06	5.14	
21	B	Nune Duarte	Macau	3.35	–	–	3.35	

=== Final ===
Rank	Athlete	Nationality	#1	#2	#3	#4	#5	#6	Result	Notes
1st place, gold medalist(s)	Viktoriya Vershynina	Ukraine	6.66	6.05	6.66	6.59	6.72	6.76	6.76	
2nd place, silver medalist(s)	Sharon Jaklofsky	Netherlands	6.55w	6.74	6.33w	6.60	6.54	6.46	6.74	
3rd place, bronze medalist(s)	Lyudmila Galkina	Russia	6.27	6.47	x	6.55	6.39	x	6.55	
4	Pat Itanyi	Nigeria	6.14	6.21	6.27	6.31w	6.35	6.24w	6.35	
5	Dayana Etchenique	Spain	2.91	6.08	6.13	5.93	6.15	6.09	6.15	
6	Ulrike Holzner	Germany	6.15	x	x	5.99	5.99	–	6.15	
7	Silvija Babić	Croatia	6.14	5.91	5.82	x	x	6.11	6.14	
8	Shizuyo Nagashima	Japan	5.95	6.04	5.89	x	5.96	5.94	6.04	
9	Rowena Welford	New Zealand	5.63	6.01	6.03				6.03	
10	Tracy Dulmage	Canada	5.55	5.82	5.61				5.82	
11	Luciana dos Santos	Brazil	5.58	5.70w	5.80				5.80	
12	Frith Maunder	New Zealand	5.65	5.73	5.78				5.78	
