= Sandrine Hennart =

Belgian long jumper and sprinter

Sandrine Hennart (born 12 December 1972) is a retired Belgian long jumper who also excelled in the sprints.

In the long jump she won the bronze medal at the 1990 World Junior Championships, finished twelfth at the 1990 European Championships and won the bronze medal at the 1994 Jeux de la Francophonie. She also competed at the 1993 World Championships and the 2000 European Indoor Championships without reaching the final.

In the shortest sprint event she competed at the 1990 World Junior Championships and the 1997 World Indoor Championships without reaching the final.

Her personal best long jump was 6.63 metres, achieved in June 1996 in Ninove. She won the Belgian Golden Spike talent award in 1990.
