= Viktoriya Vershynina =

Ukrainian long jumper (born 1971)

Personal information
- Born: 11 June 1971 (age 55) Poltava, Soviet Union

Sport
- Sport: Track and field
Medal record
Representing Ukraine
Summer Universiade
Gold medal – first place	1995 Fukuoka	Long jump
Silver medal – second place	1997 Catania	Long jump

Viktoriya Petrivna Vershynina (Ukrainian: Вікторія Петрівна Вершиніна; born 11 June 1971) is a retired Ukrainian long jumper.

Her personal best was 6.92 metres, achieved in July 1999 in Bila Tserkva. In the triple jump she has a personal best of 13.84 metres, from 1994.

== Achievements ==
Year	Competition	Venue	Position	Notes
Representing the Soviet Union
1990	World Junior Championships	Plovdiv, Bulgaria	17th (q)	5.76 m (wind: -1.2 m/s)
Representing Ukraine
1994	European Championships	Helsinki, Finland	15th (q)	6.35 m (wind: -2.2 m/s)
1995	World Championships	Gothenburg, Sweden	8th	6.66 m
1995	Universiade	Fukuoka, Japan	1st	6.76 m
1995	Military World Games	Rome, Italy	3rd	6.55 m
1997	World Championships	Athens, Greece	7th	6.71 m
1997	Universiade	Catania, Italy	2nd	6.44 m
