= Sofia Schulte =

German triple jumper (born 1976)

Personal information
- Born: 8 April 1976 (age 50) Hamm, North Rhine-Westphalia, West Germany

Sport
- Sport: Track and field
Medal record
Representing Germany
European U23 Championships
Bronze medal – third place	1997 Turku	Long jump

Sofia Schulte (born 8 April 1976) is a retired German long jumper and triple jumper.

She was born in Hamm and represented the clubs LAG Siegen, TSV Bayer 04 Leverkusen and SV Saar 05 Saarbrücken.

She finished eighth at the 1995 European Junior Championships, won the bronze medal at the 1997 European U23 Championships, finished twelfth at the 1999 Summer Universiade, and eighth at the 2002 European Championships. At the 2002 IAAF World Cup she finished seventh in long jump and eighth in the triple jump. She also competed at the 1998 European Championships, the 2000 European Indoor Championships and the 2000 Olympic Games without reaching the final.

Schulte won bronze medals at the German long jump championships in 1998, 2000 and 2002. Indoors she won bronze medals in both long and triple jump, as well as a silver medal in 2000.

She has a personal best of 6.72 metres, achieved in May 2000 in Siegen. Her personal best in the triple jump was 13.37 metres, achieved in August 2002 in Sondershausen.
