= Olga Cepero =

Cuban triple jumper

Personal information
- Born: 4 February 1975 (age 51) Santiago de Cuba, Cuba

Sport
- Sport: Track and field
Medal record
Representing Cuba
Summer Universiade
Silver medal – second place	1997 Catania	Triple jump
Central American and Caribbean Games
Bronze medal – third place	1998 Maracaibo	Triple jump

Olga Lidia Cepero (born 4 February 1975) is a retired Cuban triple jumper. Her personal best jump is 14.43 metres, achieved in February 1998 in Havana.

== Achievements ==
Year	Competition	Venue	Position	Event	Notes
Representing Cuba
1992	World Junior Championships	Seoul, South Korea	5th	Triple jump	13.05 m (wind: -0.3 m/s)
1994	World Junior Championships	Lisbon, Portugal	5th	Triple jump	13.32 m w (wind: +2.7 m/s)
1995	Central American and Caribbean Championships	Guatemala City, Guatemala	1st	Triple jump	14.14 m CR
1997	Universiade	Catania, Italy	2nd	Triple jump	14.12 m
1997	Central American and Caribbean Championships	San Juan, Puerto Rico	1st	Triple jump	14.14 m =CR
1998	Central American and Caribbean Games	Maracaibo, Venezuela	3rd	Triple jump	13.74 m
1999	Universiade	Palma, Spain	14th (q)	Long jump	6.22 m
1999	Universiade	Palma, Spain	(q)	Triple jump	13.59 m
