= Tina Čarman =

Slovenian long jumper

Personal information
- Full name: Tina Čarman
- Nationality: Slovenia
- Born: 8 January 1978 (age 48) Kranj, SR Slovenia, SFR Yugoslavia
- Height: 1.71 m (5 ft 7 1/2 in)
- Weight: 64 kg (141 lb)

Sport
- Sport: Athletics
- Event: Long jump
- Club: ŠD Dolenjske Toplice
- Coached by: Dobrivoje Vučkovič

Achievements and titles
- Personal best: Long jump: 6.56 (2003)

Tina Čarman (born 8 January 1978 in Kranj) is a retired Slovenian long jumper. She was selected to compete for the Slovenian Olympic team in the long jump at the 2004 Summer Olympics after recording a personal best of 6.56 metres from a national athletics meet in Dolenjske Toplice. Carman also trained as a member of the athletics squad for the Dolenjske Toplice Sports Club (Slovene: Športno društvo Dolenjske Toplice) under her coach Dobrivoje Vučkovič.

Carman qualified for the Slovenian squad in the women's long jump at the 2004 Summer Olympics in Athens. A year before the Games, she jumped 6.56 metres to attain both her personal best and an Olympic B-standard at a national athletics meet in Dolenjske Toplice. During the prelims, Carman fouled in two consecutive attempts until she satisfied her final jump with a spanning distance of 5.72 metres, placing her in the thirty-sixth position against a vast field of thirty-nine long jumpers.
