= Aurélie Félix =

French athletics competitor

Personal information
- Other names: Aurélie Dien
- Born: 26 March 1979 (age 47) Mont-Saint-Aignan, France
- Height: 180 cm (5 ft 11 in)
- Weight: 63 kg (139 lb)

Sport
- Country: France
- Sport: Athletics
- Event: Long jump
Medal record
Representing France
European U23 Championships
Gold medal – first place	1999 Gothenburg	Long jump
Bronze medal – third place	2001 Amsterdam	Long jump
European Junior Championships
Gold medal – first place	1997 Ljubljana	Long jump

Aurélie Félix (born 26 March 1979), also known as Aurélie Dien, is a French athlete. She is a graduate of the ASPTT Rouen, and a specialist in the long jump.

== Prize list ==
- Record holder of France Under 21s in 1999 with 6.85 m (EC hopes Gothenburg – Personal best)
- (gold) European champion in 1999 Under 21s
- (gold) European champion Juniors in 1997
- 15th IAAF World Championships in Seville in 1999
- 17th IAAF World Championships in Edmonton in 2001
- 8th Universiade in Beijing in 2001
- (gold) Champion of France Elite Long jump in 2000, 2001, 2002 and 2003
- (gold) Champion of France Indoors in 2001 and 2002, (3rd in 2004)
- Meeting International du Pas-de-Calais in 1999
- Meeting International Golden League in Brussels and Monaco in 1999
- Meeting at Riviere-Pilote (Martinique ) in 2001
- Meeting at Noisy-le-Grand 2003
- Meeting at Pierre-Benite in 2003, etc.
- (bronze) bronze medal at the European Championships Under 21s in 2001
- Formerly a specialist in the high jump 1.80 m as a cadette
