= Jade Johnson =

English track & field athlete (born 1980)

Personal information
- Nationality: British (English)
- Born: 7 June 1980 (age 46) Lambeth, London, England
- Height: 185 cm (6 ft 1 in)
- Weight: 70 kg (154 lb)

Sport
- Sport: Athletics
- Event: long jump
- Club: Herne Hill Harriers
Medal record
Representing Great Britain
Athletics
Women's athletics
European Championships
Silver medal – second place	2002 Munich	Long jump
Representing England
Commonwealth Games
Silver medal – second place	2002 Manchester	Long jump

Jade Linsey Johnson (born 7 June 1980) is an English retired track and field athlete, specialising in long jump. She represented Great Britain at the Summer Olympics in 2004 and 2008. She placed fourth at the 2003 World Championships in Athletics and was a silver medallist at the 2002 Commonwealth Games.

== Biography ==
Born to parents from Liverpool and Kingston, Jamaica, Johnson, had an allergy to sand. Johnson won five British long jump titles in 2002, 2003, 2004, 2008 and 2010.

Johnson represented England at the 2002 Commonwealth Games in Manchester, winning a silver medal. Later she won the silver medal at the 2002 European Championships and finished fourth at the 2003 World Championships. Her personal best is 6.81 metres, an Olympic qualifying distance, achieved in 2008 during the European Cup, where she placed second.

In November 2007, having returned from a serious injury, she had her lottery funding removed leading into Olympic year, making it harder for her to return to top rank competition. However, she set personal bests in the 100 metres and 200 metres sprints and in the long jump.

She came seventh in the final of the long jump in the 2008 Beijing Olympics, jumping 6.64 metres. She was very frustrated with her own performance and expressed a dissatisfaction that the winner the Brazilian Maurren Higa Maggi had previously tested positive for performance-enhancing drugs.

Johnson was selected to represent Great Britain at the 2009 European Indoor Championships but had to withdraw due to an injury.

On 25 August 2009, it was announced that she would compete in the 2009 series of Strictly Come Dancing on BBC1 with professional dancer Ian Waite. During final dress rehearsal for the 14 November edition of the show, Jade suffered a serious injury to her right knee, and therefore was forced to withdraw on 21 November. She stated that she was "devastated" to withdraw but had to be "realistic" and praised her dance partner Ian Waite for his support. Johnson returned with the other celebrities to perform at the final, and was given an extended time slot so she could perform the Tango that she had been due to perform before having to pull out.
