= Erica Johansson =

Swedish long jumper (born 1974)

Erica Johansson (born February 5, 1974) is a Swedish former athlete who specialized in the long jump. She is the 1992 World Junior Champion, the 1993 European Junior Champion, and the 2000 European Indoor Champion. She also competed at the 2000 Olympic Games.

== Career ==
Born in Landvetter, Härryda Municipality, Johansson was a promising junior who equalled the Swedish record as a 15-year-old with 6.50 meters, to win European Junior silver in 1989. A year later, she won the silver medal at the 1990 World Junior Championships, jumping 6.50 again. She yet again jumped 6.50 when finishing fourth at the 1991 European Junior Championships, missing out on the bronze medal to Iva Prandzheva on countback. The highlights of her successful junior career was winning gold medals at the 1992 World Junior Championships with 6.65 metres, and at the 1993 European Junior Championships with 6.56. Her greatest achievement at senior level came at the 2000 European Indoor Championships, where she won the gold medal with a jump of 6.89 metres.

She retired after the 2001 season.

== International competitions ==
Year	Competition	Venue	Position	Notes
Representing Sweden
1989	European Junior Championships	Varaždin, Yugoslavia	2nd	6.50 m
1990	World Junior Championships	Plovdiv, Bulgaria	2nd	6.50 m
1991	European Junior Championships	Thessalonika, Greece	4th	6.50 m
1992	World Junior Championships	Seoul, South Korea	1st	6.65 m
1993	World Indoor Championships	Toronto, Canada	6th	6.71 m
1993	European Junior Championships	San Sebastián, Spain	1st	6.56 m
1994	European Championships	Helsinki, Finland	22nd (q)	6.10 m
1997	World Championships	Athens, Greece	8th	6.64 m
1998	European Championships	Budapest, Hungary	5th	6.75 m
1999	World Championships	Seville, Spain	10th	6.63 m
2000	European Indoor Championships	Ghent, Belgium	1st	6.89 m
2000	Olympic Games	Sydney, Australia	16th (q)	6.53 m
(q) Indicates overall position in qualifying round

== Personal bests ==
- Long jump - 6.99 (2000), National record
- High jump - 1.78 (1989)
- Triple Jump - 13.95 (1999)
- 100 meters - 11.88 (1997)
- 200 m - 23.75 (1997)
- 800 m - 2:21.95 (1989)
- 100 m hurdles - 13.63 (1998)
- 400 m hurdles - 58.86 (1994)
