= List of Italian records in masters athletics =

List of Italian records in masters athletics are the current records in the various age groups of masters athletics for Italy competitors. Starting at age 35, each age group starts on the athlete's birthday in years that are evenly divisible by 5 and extends until the next such occurrence. For record purposes, older athletes are not included in younger age groups, except in the case of relay team members. A relay team's age group is determined by the age of the youngest member. There are two categories of relay records, one for composite teams made up of four American runners usually National teams at major championships, and a Club record for members of the same club, from the same Association. These are the offiacl reports of the Italian Athletics Federation.

Some masters events (hurdles, throwing implements) have modified specifications. The combined events use an age-graded result applied against the standard scoring table. Based on IAAF rule 260.18a, since 2000, indoor marks superior to the outdoor record are eligible for record purposes. They are noted with an "i"

In Italy the age of an athlete is based on the year of birth. One performance that is obtained before the initial day of age group is recognized as Italian record, but not enter in WMA ranking.

== Men ==
Legend

Current world record

Awaiting ratification

"pre" is a record performance obtained before the actual age censorship, as provided by the international federation W.M.A.

=== 100 metres ===
Event	Age	Performance	Athlete	Birthdate	Venue	Date	Meet
100 m	35	10.20 (+0.3 m/s)	Stefano Tilli	22/08/1962	Budapest	19/08/1998	European Athletics Championships
100 m	40 pre	10.53 (+1.2 m/s)	Stefano Tilli	22/08/1962	Viareggio	20/07/2002	Italian Athletics Championships
100 m	40	10.59 (+1.0 m/s)	Maurizio Checcucci	26/02/1974	Donnas	13/07/2014	"Via col Vento" Athletics Meeting
100 m	40	10.59 (+0.8 m/s)	Jacques Riparelli	27/03/1983	Brugnera	15/07/2023	Memorial Chessa
100 m	45 pre	10.87 (−0.8 m/s)	Mario Longo	21/08/1964	Rieti	06/06/2009	Italian Regional Meeting
100 m	45	11.00 (+1.4 m/s)	Mario Longo	21/08/1964	Avellino	12/09/2009	Italian Regional Athletics Championships
100 m	50	11.13 (−0.3 m/s)	Mario Longo	21/08/1964	Rome	02/06/2016	Golden Gala
100 m	55	11.51 (+0.7 m/s)	Mario Longo	21/08/1964	Naples	23/04/2022	Regional Open Meeting
100 m	55 pre	11.67 (+0.8 m/s)	Alessandro Garofoli	03/09/1971	Pistoia	30/06/2026	Regional Masters Athletics Clubs Championships
100 m	55	11.76 (−0.2 m/s)	Mario Longo	21/08/1964	Rome	22/06/2024	Italian Masters Athletics Championships
100 m	60	11.66 (+0.1 m/s)	Mario Longo	21/08/1964	Nocera Inferiore	05/07/2025	Regional Masters Athletics Championships
100 m	65	12.58 (+0.3 m/s)	Bruno Santeddu	16/06/1958	Colleferro	14/06/2025	Regional Masters Athletics Clubs Championships
100 m	70	13.10 (+1.8 m/s)	Vincenzo Barisciano	03/03/1948	Arezzo	30/06/2018	Italian Masters Athletics Championships
100 m	75 pre	13.62 (+0.6 m/s)	Livio Bugiardini	19/09/1948	Fermo	06/05/2023	Open Meet
100 m	75	13.77 (−0.5 m/s)	Livio Bugiardini	19/09/1948	Macerata	04/05/2024	Regional Masters Clubs Championships
100 m	80 pre	14.70 (+1.7 m/s)	Vincenzo La Camera	04/12/1946	Ovada	18/04/2026	Meeting Primavera
100 m	80	14.84 (+0.4 m/s)	Roberto Paesani	09/08/1946	Daegu	23/08/2026	World Masters Athletics Championships
100 m	85 pre	16.15 (−0.7 m/s)	Giuseppe Marabotti	15/11/1915	Jyväskylä	09/07/2000	European Masters Athletics Championships
100 m	85	16.42 (−0.5 m/s)	Bruno Sobrero	11/11/1920	Bellinzona	09/09/2006	Bellinzona Masters Athletics Meeting
*	85	16.25 (NWI)	Ugo Sansonetti	10/01/1919	San Benedetto del Tronto	21/05/2004	10° Adriatic Grand Prix Meeting
100 m	90 pre	17.05 ( )	Vittorio Colò	09/11/1911	Bellinzago	23/06/2001	Regional Masters Athletics Championships
100 m	90	17.82 (+1.0 m/s)	Ugo Sansonetti	10/01/1919	Lahti	01/08/2009	World Masters Athletics Championships
100 m	95	26.33 (+0.5 m/s)	Giuseppe Ottaviani	20/05/1916	Modena	05/07/2014	Italian Masters Athletics Championships
* Best results without wind detection or with winds above 2 m/s

=== 200 metres ===
Event	Age	Performance	Athlete	Birthdate	Venue	Date	Meet
200 mt	35	20.68 (+1.0 m/s)	Pietro Mennea	28/06/1952	Molfetta	26/09/1987	Memorial Poli
200 mt	40	21.26 (+0.4 m/s)	Andrew Howe	10/05/1985	Rome	22/07/2026	'Atletica di Sera' Meeting
200 mt	45 pre	22.27 (−0.4 m/s)	Mario Longo	21/08/1964	Naples	26/04/2009	Regional Athletics Championships
200 mt	45	22.35 (−0.6 m/s)	Mauro Graziano	22/01/1966	Turin	20/07/2013	2°Challenge Masters Missoni/De Matteis
200 mt	50 pre	23.11 (−2.2 m/s)	Alfonso De Feo	15/09/1964	Rome	22/07/2014	'Atletica di Sera' Meeting
200 mt	50	23.11 (+0.3 m/s)	Mauro Graziano	22/01/1966	Borgaretto	03/07/2016	Regional Masters Athletics Championships
200 mt	55	23.56 (−0.3 m/s)	Alfonso De Feo	15/09/1964	Rome	19/09/2019	Mennea Day
200 mt	60 pre	24.66 (±0.0 m/s)	Marco Giovanni Lavazza	07/10/1965	Vercelli	08/06/2025	Trofeo Dellomodarme
200 mt	60	24.85 (−1.9 m/s)	Mario Longo	21/08/1964	Nocera Inferiore	10/05/2026	Regional Masters Clubs Championships
200 m	65	26.05 (+0.8 m/s)	Bruno Santeddu	16/06/1958	Rieti	07/06/2026	Regional Athletics Championships
200 mt	70	27.20 (−1.2 m/s)	Vincenzo Felicetti	18/02/1949	Ariano Irpino	29/09/2019	Masters Athletics Clubs Championships
200 mt	75 pre	28.06 (+1.3 m/s)	Livio Bugiardini	19/09/1948	Ancona	21/05/2023	Memorial Serresi
200 m	75	28.09 (−0.7 m/s)	Livio Bugiardini	19/09/1948	Misano Adriatico	22/06/2025	Italian Masters Athletics Championships
200 m	80 pre	30.62 (+1.4 m/s)	Roberto Paesani	09/08/1946	Rieti	07/06/2026	Regional Athletics Championships
200 m	80	31.30 (−1.1 m/s)	Roberto Paesani	09/08/1946	Campi Bisenzio	20/09/2026	Italian Masters Athletics Championships
200 mt	85	34.24 (+0.2 m/s)	Ugo Sansonetti	10/01/1919	Caorle	20/06/2004	Italian Masters Athletics Championships
200 mt	90 pre	38.12 (−1.2 m/s)	Vittorio Colò	09/11/1911	Milan	29/04/2001	8° Meeting Masters Road Runners
200 mt	90	39.60 (+1.4 m/s)	Ugo Sansonetti	10/01/1919	Cattolica	21/06/2009	Italian Masters Athletics Championships
200 mt	95 pre	55.27 (+0.4 m/s)	Antonio Nacca	16/12/1923	Novara	05/05/2018	Trofeo Dellomodarme
200 mt	95	1:39.03 (−2.2 m/s)	Sergio Liverani	01/06/1931	Campi Bisenzio	20/09/2026	Italian Masters Athletics Championships
* Best results without wind detection or with winds above 2 m/s

=== 400 metres ===
Event	Age	Performance	Athlete	Birthdate	Venue	Date	Meet
400 mt	35	46.86	Enrico Saraceni	19/05/1964	Bressanone	16/06/2001	Italian Athletics Clubs Championships
400 mt	40	47.81	Enrico Saraceni	19/05/1964	Aarhus	28/07/2004	European Masters Athletics Championships
400 mt	45	48.94	Salvatore Floris	08/01/1981	Genova	27/06/2026	Regional Championships
400 mt	50	51.49	Ivan Mancinelli	12/06/1975	Rome	11/07/2026	Italian Masters Clubs Championships
400 mt	55 pre	53.38	Alfonso De Feo	15/09/1964	Rome	06/06/2019	Golden Gala
400 mt	55	53.39	Claudio Fausti	05/02/1967	Brescia	20/06/2026	Regional Masters Athletics Championships
400 mt	60	56.04	Gian Luca Morseletto	02/01/1963	Rome	22/06/2024	Italian Masters Athletics Championships
400 mt	65	59.10	Vincenzo Felicetti	18/02/1949	Cosenza	06/06/2015	Regional Masters Athletics Championships
	65	57.9	Vincenzo Felicetti	18/02/1949	Cosenza	10/05/2014	Regional Athletics Clubs Championships Regional
400 mt	70	1:00.84	Vincenzo Felicetti	18/02/1949	Jesolo	09/09/2019	European Masters Athletics Championships
400 mt	75	1:03.16	Livio Bugiardini	19/09/1948	Lignano	07/10/2023	Regions Master Trophy
400 mt	80	1:11.01	Roberto Paesani	09/08/1946	Daegu	01/09/2026	World Masters Athletics Championships
400 mt	85	1:27.55	Francesco Paderno	24/03/1935	Arezzo	10/10/2020	Italian Masters Athletics Championships
400 mt	90	1:35.04	Ugo Sansonetti	10/01/1919	Lahti	07/08/2009	World Masters Athletics Championships
400 mt	95	4:42.86	Gabriele Bianchi	27/08/1923	Campi Bisenzio	06/07/2019	Italian Masters Athletics Championships

=== 800 metres ===
Event	Age	Performance	Athlete	Birthdate	Venue	Date	Meet
800 mt	35 pre	1:48.78	Christian Obrist	20/11/1980	Nembro	01/07/2015	XIX Meeting `Città di Nembro`
800 mt	35	1:50.80	Andrea Giocondi	17/01/1969	Moscow	30/05/2004	European Champion Clubs Cup
800 mt	40	1:53.23	Andrea Sigismondi	13/04/1984	Busto Arsizio	01/06/2024	Regional Athletics Championships
800 mt	45	1:56.69	Davide Raineri	21/05/1973	Nembro	02/06/2019	Regional Athletics Clubs Championships
800 mt	50	2:01.57	Giuseppe Fatuzzo	22/04/1972	Syracuse	29/05/2022	Regional Athletics Championships
800 mt	55	2:04.45	Hassan El Azzouzi	05/05/1968	Salerno	16/07/2023	Masters Athletics Clubs Championships
800 mt	55	2:05.73	Francesco D'Agostino	09/01/1966	Brescia	13/09/2022	Provincial Masters Championships Open
800 mt	60	2:11.11	Francesco D'Agostino	09/01/1966	Brescia	02/05/2026	Regional Open Meet
800 mt	65 pre	2:17.92	Maurizio Leonardi	22/09/1959	Trento	09/07/2024	Gran Premio del Mezzofondo
800 mt	65	2:20.87	Maurizio Leonardi	22/09/1959	Rovereto	02/06/2025	Palio Città della Quercia
800 mt	70	2:29.72	Giovanni Finielli	14/07/1950	Syracuse	03/09/2020	Meeting 'Caccia al Minimo'
800 mt	75 pre	2:38.53	Giovanni Finielli	14/07/1950	Catania	27/04/2025	II International Meeting EMA League 2025
800 mt	75	2:43.63	Roberto Paesani	09/08/1946	Rome	16/10/2021	Multiple Events Trophy
800 mt	80 pre	3:08.36	Aldo Del Rio	26/12/1946	Brescia	19/07/2026	Provincial Masters Championships
800 mt	80	3:10.97	Antonio Nacca	16/12/1923	Formia	03/10/2004	Masters Athletics Clubs Championships
800 mt	85 pre	3:31.00	Luciano Acquarone	04/10/1930	Boissano	29/07/2015	"Atletica Estate" Boissano
800 mt	85	3:40.29	Giuseppe Damato	09/01/1936	Borgaretto	16/05/2021	Regional Masters Athletics Clubs Championships
800 mt	90	4:07.27	Francesco Paderno	24/03/1935	Giaveno	01/06/2025	Regional Masters Athletics Clubs Championships
800 mt	95 pre	4:48.83	Antonio Nacca	16/12/1923	Modena	30/09/2018	Masters Athletics Clubs Championships
800 mt	95	4:51.44	Antonio Nacca	16/12/1923	Asti	09/06/2019	Masters Athletics Clubs Championships Regional

=== 1500 metres ===
Event	Age	Performance	Athlete	Birthdate	Venue	Date	Meet
1500 mt	35 pre	3:44.80	Christian Obrist	20/11/1980	Conegliano	24/06/2015	Trofeo 'Fallai'
1500 mt	35	3:46.9 h	Vittorio Fontanella	17/03/1953	Cittadella	07/05/1988	
1500 mt	40 pre	3:51.62	Luigi Ferraris	19/11/1979	Milan	27/04/2019	9° Walk and Middle distance Night
1500 mt	40	3:53.11	Davide Raineri	21/05/1973	Gavardo	04/06/2017	Meeting 'Città di Gavardo'
1500 mt	45	3:53.06	Davide Raineri	21/05/1973	Bergamo	20/06/2019	Meeting Silver Lombardia
1500 mt	50 pre	4:02.82	Davide Raineri	21/05/1973	Milan	29/04/2023	12° Walk and Middle distance Night
1500 mt	50	4:05.22	Davide Raineri	21/05/1973	Lignano	07/10/2023	Regions Masters Trophy
1500 mt	55	4:16.46	Hassan El Azzouzi	05/05/1968	Lignano	07/10/2023	Regions Masters Trophy
1500 mt	55 pre	4:19.06	Gianluca Silvatico	22/10/1970	Brescia	07/09/2025	XX° Trofeo Calvesi Gabric
1500 mt	55	4:25.74	Alfredo Bonetti	07/04/1958	Villafranca di Verona	30/05/2015	Trofeo Pitch
1500 mt	60 pre	4:26.50	Mauro Pregnolato	21/10/1964	Brescia	09/06/2024	Trofeo Calvesi Gabric
1500 mt	60	4:31.73	Mauro Pregnolato	21/10/1964	Mantua	24/05/2025	Regional Masters Athletics Clubs Championships
1500 mt	65 pre	4:42.21	Maurizio Leonardi	22/09/1959	Trento	02/07/2024	Gran Premio del Mezzofondo
1500 mt	65	4:45.89	Maurizio Leonardi	22/09/1959	Catania	20/09/2025	Italian Masters Clubs Championships
1500 mt	70	4:59.72	Luciano Moser	28/01/1953	Salerno	15/07/2023	Masters Athletics Clubs Championships
1500 mt	75 pre	5:34.15	Luciano Acquarone	04/10/1930	Chivasso	02/07/2005	Masters Athletics Clubs Championships Regional
1500 mt	75	5:41.21	Luciano Acquarone	04/10/1930	Chivasso	24/06/2006	Masters Athletics Clubs Championships Regional
1500 mt	80	6:13.88	Luciano Acquarone	04/10/1930	Boissano	05/10/2011	
1500 mt	85 pre	7:01.46	Luciano Acquarone	04/10/1930	Bastia Umbra	19/09/2015	Masters Athletics Clubs Championships
1500 mt	85	7:06.03	Bruno Baggia	14/07/1933	Jesolo	07/09/2019	European Masters Athletics Championships
1500 mt	90	8:35.58	Francesco Paderno	24/03/1935	Giaveno	31/05/2025	Regional Masters Athletics Clubs Championships
1500 mt	95 pre	10:10.58	Antonio Nacca	16/12/1923	Modena	29/09/2018	Italian Masters Athletics Clubs Championships
1500 mt	95	10:14.31	Antonio Nacca	16/12/1923	Asti	08/06/2019	Masters Athletics Clubs Championships Regional

=== 3000 metres ===
Event	Age	Performance	Athlete	Birthdate	Venue	Date	Meet
3000 mt	35	7:59.99	Angelo Carosi	20/01/1964	Lignano Sabbiadoro	05/08/2000	11° Meeting Sport Solidarietà
3000 mt	40	8:15.38	Vittorio Fontanella	17/03/1953	Livorno	18/06/1995	Italian Athletics Clubs Championships
3000 mt	45	8:20.68	Davide Raineri	21/05/1973	Rodengo Saiano	16/05/2019	Meeting Silver Lombardia
3000 mt	50	8:48.67	Graziano Zugnoni	26/04/1974	Rodengo Saiano	19/06/2024	Provincial Open Championships
3000 mt	55	9:28.32	Valerio Brignone	25/07/1967	Cairo Montenotte	15/09/2022	Memorial Pier Mariano Penone - 2a Giornata
3000 mt	60	9:50.8	Antonio Trabucco	10/04/1948	Ostia Lido	08/06/2008	
3000 mt	65 pre	10:05.59	Maurizio Leonardi	22/09/1959	Trento	16/07/2024	Gran Premio del Mezzofondo
3000 mt	65 ind	10:12.58	Maurizio Leonardi	22/09/1959	Padua	01/02/2025	Regional indoor Championships Multiple Events
3000 mt	65	10:17.51	Maurizio Leonardi	22/09/1959	Trento	22/07/2025	Gran Premio del Mezzofondo
3000 mt	70 ind	10:38.15	Luciano Moser	28/01/1953	Padua	05/03/2023	Regional indoor Masters Championships
3000 mt	70	10:59.51	Luciano Moser	28/01/1953	Trento	18/07/2023	Summer Grand Prix of Middle Distance
3000 mt	75 pre	11:27.5	Luciano Acquarone	04/10/1930	Chivasso	03/07/2005	Masters Athletics Clubs Championships Regional
3000 mt	75	11:45.28	Luciano Acquarone	04/10/1930	Chivasso	25/06/2006	Masters Athletics Clubs Championships Regional
3000 mt	80	13:05.22	Luciano Acquarone	04/10/1930	Imperia	02/07/2011	Trofeo Maurina
3000 mt	85 pre	14:51.82	Luciano Acquarone	04/10/1930	Savona	30/05/2015	2° Meeting Master 'Città di Savona'
3000 mt	90	18:07.84	Francesco Paderno	24/03/1935	Vercelli	06/04/2025	Meeting di Primavera
3000 mt	95	22:46.4	Antonio Nacca	16/12/1923	Novara	16/12/2018	Tre Miglia d'oro Città di Novara

=== 5000 metres ===
Event	Age	Performance	Athlete	Birthdate	Venue	Date	Meet
5000 mt	35	13:48.62	Angelo Carosi	20/01/1964	Milan	09/06/1999	
5000 mt	40	14:09.2	Angelo Carosi	20/01/1964	Rome	23/06/2004	
5000 mt	45	14:21.77	Said Boudalia	04/07/1968	Rieti	29/09/2013	Italian Athletics Clubs Championships
5000 mt	50	14:59.70	Said Boudalia	04/07/1968	Eraclea	13/09/2019	European Masters Athletics Championships
5000 mt	55 pre	16:03.52	Luciano Acquarone	04/10/1930	Rome	25/06/1985	World Masters Athletics Championships
5000 mt	55	16:03.6	Valerio Brignone	25/07/1967	Asti	13/10/2022	Regional Athletics Meeting
5000 mt	60	16:36.99	Cesare Bini	04/06/1929	Eugene	01/08/1989	World Masters Athletics Championships
5000 mt	65	17:33.68	Cesare Bini	04/06/1929	Athens	04/06/1994	European Masters Athletics Championships
5000 mt	70	18:34.72	Luciano Acquarone	04/10/1930	Brisbane	06/07/2001	World Masters Athletics Championships
5000 mt	75 pre	20:02.28	Luciano Acquarone	04/10/1930	Comacchio	05/06/2005	Italian Masters Athletics Championships
5000 mt	75	20:17.5 h	Luciano Acquarone	04/10/1930	Vado Ligure	17/05/2006	
5000 mt	80 pre	21:52.97	Luciano Acquarone	04/10/1930	Rome	11/06/2010	Italian Masters Athletics Championships
5000 mt	80	22:38.48	Luciano Acquarone	04/10/1930	Modena	19/06/2011	Masters Athletics Clubs Championships Regional
5000 mt	85	24:50.08	Bruno Baggia	14/07/1933	Eraclea	13/09/2019	European Masters Athletics Championships
5000 mt	90	34:16.67	Antonio Nacca	16/12/1923	Gravellona	11/06/2016	Meeting di San Pietro
5000 mt	95	39:42.52	Antonio Nacca	16/12/1923	Novara	04/05/2019	Trofeo Dellomodarme

=== 10,000 metres ===
Event	Age	Performance	Athlete	Birthdate	Venue	Date	Meet
10,000 mt	35 pre	28:51.4	Carlo Terzer	12/10/1955	Tirrenia	29/04/1990	
10,000 mt	35	28:52.41	Roberto Barbi	25/03/1965	Carpi	17/06/2000	10000 mt Italian Athletics Championships
10,000 mt	40 pre	29:25.30	Daniele Caimmi	17/12/1972	Terni	06/05/2012	10000 mt Italian Athletics Championships
10,000 mt	40	30:08.01	Daniele Caimmi	17/12/1972	Ancona	18/05/2013	10000 mt Italian Athletics Championships
10,000 mt	45 pre	30:23.88	Davide Raineri	21/05/1973	Rodengo Saiano	21/04/2018	10000 mt Regional Athletics Championships
10,000 mt	45	30:49.46	Said Boudalia	04/07/1968	Treviso	09/04/2017	10000 mt Regional Athletics Championships
10,000 mt	50 pre	31:28.49	Said Boudalia	04/07/1968	Marina di Carrara	21/04/2018	10000 mt Regional Athletics Championships
10,000 mt	50	31:54.81	Said Boudalia	04/07/1968	Treviso	28/04/2019	10000 mt Regional Athletics Championships
10,000 mt	55	33:15.96	Pasquale Iapicco	20/09/1968	Nocera Inferiore	28/03/2026	10000 mt Regional Athletics Championships
10,000 mt	60	34:14.08	Luciano Acquarone	04/10/1930	Turku	20/07/1991	World Masters Athletics Championships
10,000 mt	65 pre	36:34.76	Maurizio Leonardi	22/09/1959	Vercelli	27/04/2024	10000m Italian Masters Athletics Championships
10,000 mt	65	36:42.62	Antonio Trabucco	10/04/1948	Rome	21/04/2013	10000 mt Regional Athletics Championships
10,000 mt	70	38:40.49	Luciano Acquarone	04/10/1930	Brisbane	09/07/2001	World Masters Athletics Championships
10,000 mt	75 pre	40:57.99	Luciano Acquarone	04/10/1930	Comacchio	03/06/2005	Italian Masters Athletics Championships
10,000 mt	75	41:21.61	Luciano Acquarone	04/10/1930	Misano	09/06/2006	Italian Masters Athletics Championships
10,000 mt	80 pre	45:02.56	Luciano Acquarone	04/10/1930	Rome	12/06/2010	Italian Masters Athletics Championships
10,000 mt	80	46:33.24	Luciano Acquarone	04/10/1930	Modena	18/06/2011	Masters Athletics Clubs Championships Regional
10,000 mt	85 pre	51:31.28	Luciano Acquarone	04/10/1930	Boissano	11/04/2015	10000 mt Regional Athletics Championships
10,000 mt	90	1h18:12.96	Angelo Squadrone	21/02/1929	Eraclea	08/09/2019	European Masters Athletics Championships

=== 10K run ===
Event	Age	Performance	Athlete	Birthdate	Venue	Date	Meet
10K run	35 pre	28:08	Daniele Meucci	07/10/1985	Valencia	12/01/2020	10k Valencia Ibercaja
10K run	35	28:13	Stefano Baldini	25/05/1971	Porto Sant'Elpidio	22/07/2006	Trofeo Ricci
10K run	40	28:58	Yassine El Fathaoui	23/03/1982	Pescara	10/09/2023	10 km Italian Championship
10K run	45	30:33	Davide Raineri	21/05/1973	Turin	14/04/2019	T-Fast10
10K run	50	30:58	Said Boudalia	04/07/1968	San Giorgio delle Pertiche	09/09/2018	10 km sul Graticolato Romano
10K run	55 pre	31:47	Said Boudalia	04/07/1968	Vicenza	19/03/2023	10 km Stravicenza
10K run	55	32:19	Said Boudalia	04/07/1968	Pescara	10/09/2023	10 km Italian Championship
10K run	60	34:06	Gianluca Maiorano	13/02/1964	Ponte San Nicolò	11/05/2024	1to1 Sport Race
10K run	65	36:15	Maurizio Vagnoli	29/12/1959	Foggia	18/05/2025	10 km road Italian Masters Championships
10K run	70 pre	38:37	Adolfo Accalai	11/10/1950	Misano Adriatico	23/02/2020	Gran Premio Città di Misano
10K run	70	38:55	Luciano Acquarone	04/10/1930	Camporosso	08/09/2002	Corsa dell'oleandro /Regional Championships
10K run	75 pre	40:28	Luciano Acquarone	04/10/1930	Marina di Carrara	17/04/2005	10 km road Italian Masters Championships
10K run	75	40:47	Araldo Viroli	08/06/1948	Cesenatico	09/03/2025	10 km Attraverso Cesenatico
10K run	80	46:19	Luciano Acquarone	04/10/1930	Thionville	13/05/2011	Non Stadia European Masters Championships
10K run	85	52:29	Giuseppe Damato	09/01/1936	Vinovo	06/10/2024	Hipporun
10K run	90	55:20	Giuseppe Damato	09/01/1936	Ciriè	07/06/2026	StraCiriè
10k run	95	1h49:03	Angelo Squadrone	21/02/1929	Gothenburg	18/08/2024	World Masters Athletics Championships

=== Half marathon ===
Event	Age	Performance	Athlete	Birthdate	Venue	Date	Meet
Half marathon	35 pre	1h01:14	Stefano Baldini	25/05/1971	Milan	02/04/2006	Milano half marathon
Half marathon	35	1h01:47	Xavier Chevrier	17/03/1990	Barcelona	15/02/2026	Barcelona half marathon
Half marathon	40 pre	1h03:24	Daniele Meucci	07/10/1985	Naples	23/02/2025	Napoli Half marathon
Half marathon	40	1h03:29	Said Boudalia	04/07/1968	Udine	28/09/2008	Udine half marathon
Half marathon	40	1h03:29	Ruggero Pertile	08/08/1974	Fucecchio	06/03/2016	Italian Championships Half Marathon
Half marathon	45	1h06:43	Said Boudalia	04/07/1968	Treviglio	22/02/2015	Città di Treviglio half marathon
Half marathon	45	1h07:12	Said Boudalia	04/07/1968	Agropoli	15/10/2017	Italian Championships Half Marathon
Half marathon	50	1h06:55	Said Boudalia	04/07/1968	Foligno	21/10/2018	Italian Championships Half Marathon
Half marathon	55	1h10:14a	Said Boudalia	04/07/1968	Venice	26/10/2025	Venice Marathon
Half marathon	55	1h11:45	Said Boudalia	04/07/1968	Palmanova	23/11/2025	Palmanova Half Marathon
Half marathon	55	1h11:52	Said Boudalia	04/07/1968	Cagliari	03/12/2023	Half Marathon Città di Cagliari
Half marathon	55	1h11:52	Pasquale Iapicco	20/09/1968	San Benedetto del Tronto	13/04/2025	Italian Masters Championships Half Marathon
Half marathon	60	1h14:08	Gianluca Maiorano	13/02/1964	San Benedetto del Tronto	12/04/2026	Half Marathon San Benedetto del Tronto
Half marathon	65	1h17:54	Maurizio Vagnoli	29/12/1959	San Benedetto del Tronto	13/04/2025	Italian Masters Championships Half Marathon
Half marathon	70	1h24:09	Luciano Acquarone	04/10/1930	Alba	29/04/2001	
Half marathon	75 pre	1h28:31	Luciano Acquarone	04/10/1930	Alba	08/05/2005	
Half marathon	75	1h29:48	Araldo Viroli	08/06/1948	San Benedetto del Tronto	13/04/2025	Italian Masters Championships Half Marathon
Half marathon	80 pre	1h37:10	Luciano Acquarone	04/10/1930	Cuneo	22/05/2010	Cuneo half marathon
Half marathon	80	1h39:47	Luciano Acquarone	04/10/1930	San Benedetto del Tronto	17/04/2011	Italian Masters Championships Half Marathon
Half marathon	85	1h54:31	Giuseppe Damato	09/01/1936	Turin	27/03/2022	Turin Half Marathon
Half marathon	90	2h07:36	Giuseppe Damato	09/01/1936	Turin	19/04/2026	Turin Half Marathon

=== Marathon ===
Event	Age	Performance	Athlete	Birthdate	Venue	Date	Meet
Marathon	35 pre	2h07:22	Stefano Baldini	25/05/1971	London	23/04/2006	London Marathon
Marathon	35	2h07:49	Daniele Meucci	07/10/1985	Seville	18/02/2024	Seville Marathon
Marathon	40	2h10:22	Yassine El Fathaoui	23/03/1982	Paris	03/04/2022	Paris Marathon
Marathon	45 pre	2h20:38	Said Boudalia	04/07/1968	Vittorio Veneto	03/03/2013	Treviso Marathon
Marathon	45	2h20:53a	Said Boudalia	04/07/1968	Venice	25/10/2015	Venice Marathon
Marathon	45	2h22:26	Markus Ploner	10/11/1980	London	26/04/2026	London Marathon
Marathon	50	2h24:23	Massimiliano Zanaboni	14/10/1972	Valencia	07/12/2025	Valencia Marathon
Marathon	55	2h29:45a	Said Boudalia	04/07/1968	Venice	22/10/2023	Venice Marathon
Marathon	55	2h31:44	Ettore Scarnecchia	29/08/1970	Rome	22/03/2026	Rome Marathon
Marathon	60	2h38:15	Luciano Acquarone	04/10/1930	Turku	28/07/1991	World Masters Athletics Championships
Marathon	65	2h48:10	Luciano Acquarone	04/10/1930	Durban	27/07/1997	World Masters Athletics Championships
Marathon	70	3h02:37	Luciano Acquarone	04/10/1930	Potsdam	25/08/2002	European Masters Athletics Championships
Marathon	75	3h10:57	Luciano Acquarone	04/10/1930	Carpi	16/10/2005	Maratona d'Italia
Marathon	80	3h46:03	Antonino Caponetto	11/12/1931	Reggio Emilia	11/12/2011	'Città del Tricolore' Marathon
Marathon	85	4h13:56	Giuseppe Damato	09/01/1936	Turin	14/11/2021	Turin Marathon
Marathon	90	4h35:14 (4h30:31c)	Giuseppe Damato	09/01/1936	Milan	12/04/2026	Milano Marathon

=== 100K run ===
Event	Age	Performance	Athlete	Birthdate	Venue	Date	Meet
100K run	35	6h25:47	Giorgio Calcaterra	11/02/1972	Florence-Faenza	28/05/2011	100 km del Passatore
100K run	40	6h18:24	Mario Ardemagni	02/04/1963	Winschoten	11/09/2004	IAU 100 km World Championships
100K run	45	6h42:35	Giorgio Calcaterra	11/02/1972	Sveti Martin	08/09/2018	IAU 100 km World Championships
100K run	50	7h05:25	Gianluca Tonetti	21/04/1967	Seregno	15/04/2018	Italy 100 km National Masters Championships
100K run	55	7h59:37	Mauro Gagliardini	02/04/1966	Porto Recanati	22/02/2025	Italy 100 km National Masters Championships
100K run	60	8h23:05	Enrico Bartolini	14/06/1963	Porto Recanati	22/02/2025	Italy 100 km National Masters Championships
100K run	65 pre	8h35:15	Marco Spina	17/12/1960	Porto Recanati	22/02/2025	Italy 100 km National Masters Championships
100K run	65	9h18:43	Piero Fiordi	08/06/1951	Seregno	26/03/2017	Italy 100 km National Masters Championships
100K run	70	9h50:24	Michele D'Errico	07/05/1954	Porto Recanati	22/02/2025	Italy 100 km National Masters Championships
100K run	75	10h38:20	Antonino Caponetto	11/12/1931	Winschoten	08/09/2007	IAU 100 km World Championships
100K run	80	10h40:42	Antonino Caponetto	11/12/1931	Seregno	22/04/2012	IAU 100 km World Championships
100K run	85 pre	13h28:40	Antonino Caponetto	11/12/1931	Florence-Faenza	29/05/2016	100 km del Passatore
100K run	85	13h45:04	Antonino Caponetto	11/12/1931	Florence-Faenza	28/05/2017	100 km del Passatore
100K run	90	17h35:04	Walter Fagnani	17/09/1924	Florence-Faenza	29/05/2016	100 km del Passatore
The records of this specialty have been drawn up for the first time in 2012 on the basis of results in the FIDAL archive starting in 2008. Any other better performance than the ones included should be reported to the statistical office

=== 24H run ===
Event	Age	Performance	Athlete	Birthdate	Venue	Date
24H run	35	266.702	Ivan Cudin	15/02/1975	Taipei	08/12/2013
24H run	35	263.841	Ivan Cudin	15/02/1975	Brive	13/05/2010
24H run	40	249.876	Sergio Orsi	24/01/1962	Worschach	16/07/2005
24H run	45	288.438	Marco Visintini	15/09/1976	Verona	18/09/2022
24H run	50	243.718	Tiziano Marchesi	02/03/1969	Verona	18/09/2022
24H run	55	237.899	Tiziano Marchesi	02/03/1969	Verona	15/09/2024
24H run	60	203.679	Gastone Barichello	30/08/1959	Verona	18/09/2021
24H run	65	208.494	Tarcisio Fresia	20/01/1946	Turin	12/04/2015
24H run	70	200.321	Tarcisio Fresia	20/01/1946	Turin	23/04/2017
24H run	75	144.173	Francesco Capeci	24/04/1946	Verona	18/09/2021
24H run	80	166.530	Giovanni Nanni	18/07/1907	Gonars	09/09/1989
24H run	85 pre	105.414	Antonino Cernuschi	29/12/1940	Verona	21/09/2025
24H run	85	100.788	Antonino Caponetto	11/12/1931	San Giovanni Lupatoto	15/09/2019

=== 3000 m steeplechase ===
Event	Age	Performance	Athlete	Birthdate	Venue	Date	Meet
3000 St (h 0.91)	35	8:22.98	Angelo Carosi	20/01/1964	Montecarlo	04/08/1999	Herculis
3000 St (h 0.91)	40	8:38.40	Angelo Carosi	20/01/1964	Florence	11/07/2004	Italian Athletics Championships
3000 St (h 0.91)	45 pre	9:41.82	Roberto Meneghello	05/11/1958	Conegliano	17/05/2003	Italian Athletics Club Championships Regional
3000 St (h 0.91)	45	9:47.61	Luigi Del Buono	09/03/1979	Madeira	11/10/2025	European Masters Athletics Championships
3000 St (h 0.91)	50	10:01.49	Roberto Meneghello	05/11/1958	Comacchio	26/09/2009	Italian Athletics Clubs Championships
3000 St (h 0.91)	55	10:55.92	Fabio Solito	07/03/1967	Gothenburg	13/08/2024	World Masters Athletics Championships

=== 2000 m steeplechase ===
Event	Age	Performance	Athlete	Birthdate	Venue	Date	Meet
2000 St (h 0.76)	60	7:13.71	Claudio Nottolini	02/01/1962	Pistoia	18/06/2022	Regional Masters Athletics Championships
2000 St (h 0.76)	65	7:32.36	Mario Tible	20/05/1942	Riccione	15/09/2007	World Masters Athletics Championships
2000 St (h 0.76)	70 pre	8:24.96	Santi Santangelo	12/07/1952	Pistoia	18/06/2022	Regional Masters Athletics Championships
2000 St (h 0.76)	70	8:29.74	Giovanni Finielli	14/07/1950	Tampere	08/07/2022	World Masters Championships
2000 St (h 0.76)	75	9:57.19	Giovanni Guerini	04/07/1933	Cattolica	20/06/2009	Italian Masters Athletics Championships
2000 St (h 0.76)	80 pre	10:33.28	Giovanni Sergi	04/10/1945	Misano Adriatico	22/06/2025	Italian Masters Athletics Championships
2000 St (h 0.76)	80	12:27.00	Giovanni Bonora	08/01/1915	Buffalo	23/07/1995	World Masters Athletics Championships
2000 St (h 0.76)	85 pre	14:44.22	Giuseppe Pantò	18/12/1938	Catania	26/08/2023	Regional Masters Athletics Championships

=== 110/100/80 m hs ===
Event	Age	Performance	Athlete	Birthdate	Venue	Date	Meet
110 hs (106)	35 pre	13.70 (±0.0 m/s)	Paolo Dal Molin	21/07/1987	Turku	14/06/2022	Paavo Nurmi Games
110 hs (106)	35	13.77 (+1.2 m/s)	Paolo Dal Molin	21/07/1987	Palermo	10/06/2023	Italian Athletics Clubs Championships
110 hs (100)	35	14.32 (+1.6 m/s)	Stefano Longoni	29/12/1975	Comacchio	22/06/2012	Italian Masters Athletics Championships
110 hs (100)	40	14.37 (−2.8 m/s)	Aramis Diaz	22/11/1974	Jesolo	12/09/2019	European Masters Athletics Championships
110 hs (100)	45 pre	14.37 (−2.8 m/s)	Aramis Diaz	22/11/1974	Jesolo	12/09/2019	European Masters Athletics Championships
110 hs (100)	45	15.07 (+1.5 m/s)	Mario Ortelli	10/05/1980	Molfetta	20/06/2026	Regional Masters Athletics Championships
100 hs (091)x8.50	50	14.15 (+1.8 m/s)	Thomas Oberhofer	14/12/1964	Lyon	14/08/2015	World Masters Athletics Championships
100 hs (091)x8.50	55	14.90 (−0.2 m/s)	Renzo Romano	25/02/1967	Tampere	09/07/2022	World Masters Championships
100 hs (084)12-8-16	80	15.04 (±0.0 m/s)	Thomas Oberhofer	14/12/1964	Daegu	02/09/2026	World Masters Athletics Championships
100 hs (084)12-8-16	65	16.38 (+1.1 m/s)	Hubert Indra	24/03/1957	Grosseto	10/06/2022	Italian Masters Athletics Championships
New distance of hurdles categories M60 and M65 in force in Italy since 01/01/2010
80 hs (076)x7 m	70 pre	13.90 (+1.9 m/s)	Lamberto Boranga	31/10/1942	Comacchio	22/06/2012	Italian Masters Athletics Championships
80 hs (076)x7 m	70	14.19 (±0.0 m/s)	Enzo Azzoni	11/12/1931	Turin	20/06/2003	Italian Masters Athletics Championships
80 hs (076)x7 m	75 pre	15.12 (+1.4 m/s)	Vincenzo La Camera	04/12/1946	Santarcangelo	28/08/2021	Regional Masters Athletics Championships
80 hs (076)x7 m	75	15.32 (−1.0 m/s)	Vincenzo La Camera	04/12/1946	Mondovì	08/06/2024	Regional Masters Championships
80 hs (068)x7 m	80 pre	15.48 (+0.9 m/s)	Vincenzo La Camera	04/12/1946	Castelfranco Emilia	10/09/2026	Regional Masters Clubs Championships
80 hs (068)x7 m	80	16.95 (+0.2 m/s)	Bruno Sobrero	11/11/1920	Potsdam	23/08/2002	European Masters Athletics Championships
80 hs (068)x 7 m	85	19.87 (+1.3 m/s)	Ugo Sansonetti	10/01/1919	Aarhus	29/07/2004	European Masters Athletics Championships

=== 400 m hs ===
Event	Age	Performance	Athlete	Birthdate	Venue	Date	Meet
400 hs (091)	35	49.41	Laurent Ottoz	10/04/1970	Almera	02/07/2005	Mediterranean Games
400 hs (091)	40	50.55	Aramis Diaz	22/11/1974	Ginevra	06/06/2015	Meeting EAP Geneve
400 hs (091)	45 pre	52.86	Aramis Diaz	22/11/1974	Aalter	04/08/2019	Botha Meeting
400 hs (091)	45	53.57	Aramis Diaz	22/11/1974	Rome	05/09/2020	Meeting 'Caccia al Minimo' 2
400 hs (084)	50	57.15	Sante Galassi	25/07/1969	Montebelluna	24/07/2022	Regional Masters Athletics Championships
400 hs (084)	55 pre	1:01.57	Frederic Peroni	10/09/1963	Angers	16/06/2018	France Masters Athletics Championships
400 hs (084)	55	1:01.67	Frederic Peroni	10/09/1963	Yverdon	29/09/2018	Meeting de clôture

=== 300 m hs ===
Event	Age	Performance	Athlete	Birthdate	Venue	Date	Meet
300 hs (076)	60	44.38	Antonio D'Errico	25/07/1964	Madeira	12/10/2025	European Masters Championships
300 hs (076)	65	47.32	Antonio Montaruli	28/03/1948	Carugate	08/06/2013	Provincial Athletics Meeting
300 hs (068)	70	51.28	Rudolf Frei	23/11/1948	Jesolo	07/09/2019	European Masters Championships
300 hs (068)	75 pre	56.37	Giovanni Finielli	14/07/1950	Misano Adriatico	20/06/2025	Italian Masters Athletics Championships
300 hs (068)	75	56.83	Aldo Del Rio	29/12/1946	Bellinzona	24/09/2022	22° International Masters Meeting

=== 200 m hs ===
Event	Age	Performance	Athlete	Birthdate	Venue	Date	Meet
200 hs (076x18.30)	35	25.39 (+0.2 m/s)	Paolo Citterio	29/08/1975	Cagliari	03/10/2010	Masters Athletics Clubs Championships
*	35	25.28 ( )	Stefano Longoni	29/12/1975	Gavardo	08/07/2012	Regional Masters Clubs Championships
200 hs (076x18.30)	40	25.83 (+0.4 m/s)	Paolo Citterio	29/08/1975	Montecassiano	17/09/2017	Masters Athletics Clubs Championships
200 hs (076x18.30)	45	25.08 (−1.1 m/s)	Aramis Diaz	22/11/1974	Tivoli	04/07/2021	Masters Athletics Clubs Championships
200 hs (076x18.30)	50 pre	26.62 (+1.5 m/s)	Paolo Citterio	29/08/1975	Castano Primo	06/04/2025	II Soi Sprint
200 hs (076x18.30)	50	26.71 (+1.3 m/s)	Sante Galassi	25/07/1969	Salerno	16/07/2023	Masters Athletics Clubs Championships
200 hs (076x18.30)	55	28.85 (+1.5 m/s)	Antonio D'Errico	25/07/1964	Avellino	08/05/2022	Masters Regional Clubs Championships
200 hs (076x18.30)	60	29.69 (−0.4 m/s)	Antonio D'Errico	25/07/1964	Catania	21/09/2025	Masters Athletics Clubs Championships
200 hs (076x18.30)	65	31.54 (−1.2 m/s)	Antonio Montaruli	28/03/1948	Milan	16/06/2013	Masters Clubs Regional Championships
200 hs (076x18.30)	70	36.04 (+0.1 m/s)	Antonio Montaruli	28/03/1948	Modena	30/09/2018	Masters Athletics Clubs Championships
200 hs (076x18.30)	75	38.36 (−0.2 m/s)	Vincenzo La Camera	04/12/1946	Celle Ligure	15/10/2022	Incontro dell'Amicizia
200 hs (076x18.30)	80	1:00.13 (−0.8 m/s)	Francesco Bruni	22/04/1941	Macerata	05/05/2024	Masters Regional Clubs Championships
200 hs 5hs (068)	80	43.45 (+0.4 m/s)	Francesco Paderno	24/03/1935	Cassino	03/07/2015	Italian Masters Athletics Championships
200 hs 5hs (068)	85	55.95 (−0.5 m/s)	Francesco Paderno	24/03/1935	Arezzo	09/10/2020	Italian Masters Athletics Championships
*Best results without wind detection or with winds above 2 m/s

=== High jump ===
Event	Age	Performance	Athlete	Birthdate	Venue	Date	Meet
High jump	35 pre	2.28 i	Nicola Ciotti	05/10/1976	Banská Bystrica	09/02/2011	Europa SC
High jump	35	2.25	Marco Fassinotti	29/04/1989	Rabat	25/05/2025	Meeting International Mohammed VI
High jump	40 pre	2.13 i	Giulio Ciotti	05/10/1976	Ancona	06/03/2016	Italian Indoor Athletics Championships
High jump	40	2.06	Nicola Ciotti	05/10/1976	Leiria	27/05/2017	European Champion Clubs Cup
High jump	40	2.06	Andrea Lemmi	12/05/1984	Lucca	12/05/2024	Regional Clubs Championships
High jump	45	2.04	Marco Segatel	23/03/1962	Cernusco sul Naviglio	19/07/2007	Regional Athletics Meeting
High jump	50	1.95 i	Marco Segatel	23/03/1962	Bergamo	12/01/2013	Regional Athletics Meeting indoor
High jump	50	1.90	Marco Segatel	23/03/1962	Bellinzona	08/09/2012	Bellinzona Masters Athletics Meeting
High jump	55	1.91	Marco Segatel	23/03/1962	Orvieto	08/07/2017	Italian Masters Athletics Championships
High jump	60 pre	1.81 i	Marco Segatel	23/03/1962	Bergamo	08/01/2022	Regional Athletics Meeting Open
High jump	60	1.78	Marco Segatel	23/03/1962	Modena	07/05/2022	Regional Masters Clubs Championships
High jump	65	1.69 i	Marco Mastrolorenzi	27/12/1960	Ancona	07/03/2026	Italian Masters Athletics Championships indoor
High jump	65	1.65	Marco Mastrolorenzi	27/12/1960	Rieti	18/04/2026	Decathlon Masters
High jump	70 pre	1.54	Lamberto Boranga	30/10/1942	Zittau	20/08/2012	European Masters Athletics Championships
High jump	70	1.48	Lamberto Boranga	30/10/1942	Lyon	14/08/2015	World Masters Athletics Championships
High jump	75	1.42	Antonio Baroncelli	06/01/1951	Montespertoli	20/06/2026	Regional Masters Championships
High jump	80 pre	1.24	Lamberto Boranga	30/10/1942	Fabriano	07/05/2022	Regional Masters Regional Clubs Championships
High jump	80 pre	1.24	Lamberto Boranga	30/10/1942	Grosseto	11/06/2022	Italian Masters Athletics Championships
High jump	80	1.21	Alberto Sofia	29/09/1941	Foggia	16/10/2022	3a Tappa Stadion 192
High jump	85	1.16 i	Giorgio Bortolozzi	04/01/1937	Ancona	11/02/2022	Italian Masters Athletics Championships indoor
High jump	85	1.15	Giorgio Bortolozzi	04/01/1937	Grosseto	11/06/2022	Italian Masters Athletics Championships
High jump	90	1.01	Aldo Zorzi	09/02/1932	Bolzano	10/06/2023	Regional Masters Clubs Championships
High jump	95	0.85	Giuseppe Ottaviani	20/05/1916	Senigallia	02/09/s2012	Regional Masters Athletics Championships

=== Pole vault ===
Event	Age	Performance	Athlete	Birthdate	Venue	Date	Meet
Pole vault	35	5.70	Giuseppe Gibilisco	05/01/1979	Rieti	12/07/2014	Trofeo Perseo
Pole vault	40	5.00	Giacomo Befani	08/01/1970	Orvieto	13/06/2010	Athletics Clubs Championships Regional
Pole vault	45	4.70 i	Giacomo Befani	08/01/1970	Ancona	30/03/2016	European Masters Athletics Championships Indoor
Pole vault	45	4.60	Giacomo Befani	08/01/1970	Orvieto	10/07/2015	Trofeo 'Città di Orvieto'
Pole vault	50	4.30	Giacomo Befani	08/01/1970	Pescara	28/09/2023	European Masters Athletics Championships
Pole vault	55	4.15	Massimiliano Ruggio	24/06/1969	Misano Adriatico	20/06/2025	Italian Masters Athletics Championships
Pole vault	60	3.80	Hubert Indra	24/03/1957	Arezzo	03/06/2018	Italian Multiple Events Masters Championships
Pole vault	60	3.80	Marco Mastrolorenzi	27/12/1960	Tivoli	18/04/2021	Multiple Events Regional Championships
Pole vault	65	3.60	Marco Mastrolorenzi	27/12/1960	Rieti	19/04/2026	Multiple Events Regional Championships
Pole vault	70	3.25 i	Arrigo Ghi	07/03/1945	Ancona	23/02/2019	Italian Masters Athletics Championships Indoor
Pole vault	70	3.20	Arrigo Ghi	07/03/1945	Arezzo	29/06/2018	Italian Masters Athletics Championships
Pole vault	75	3.00	Arrigo Ghi	07/03/1945	Reggiolo	02/07/2022	Memorial Bolondi
Pole vault	80	2.70	Arrigo Ghi	07/03/1945	Modena	26/04/2025	Meeting Città di Modena
Pole vault	85	2.20	Galdino Rossi	22/08/1938	Mantua	10/09/2023	Regional Masters Athletics Championships

=== Long jump ===
Event	Age	Performance	Athlete	Birthdate	Venue	Date	Meet
Long jump	35 pre	8.03 i	Fabrizio Donato	14/08/1976	Ancona	12/02/2011	Italian Indoor Athletics Championships
Long jump	35	7.95 i	Fabrizio Donato	14/08/1976	Ancona	25/02/2012	Italian Indoor Athletics Championships
Long jump	35	7.75 (+1.4 m/s)	Andrew Howe	12/05/1985	Rieti	23/04/2021	Trofeo Perseo
Long jump	40	7.33 (+0.7 m/s)	Andrew Howe	12/05/1985	Rieti	20/05/2025	Invitational Meet
Long jump	45 pre	6.62 (+1.2 m/s)	Massimiliano Rizzieri	24/10/1968	Orvieto	29/06/2013	Italian Masters Athletics Championships
Long jump	45	6.54 (+0.6 m/s)	Franco Menotti	27/02/1961	Gorizia	19/09/2006	
Long jump	50	6.75 i	Gianni Becatti	27/08/1963	Ancona	28/02/2015	Italian Masters Indoor Athletics Championships
Long jump	50	6.59 (−1.3 m/s)	Gianni Becatti	27/08/1963	İzmir	25/08/2014	European Masters Athletics Championships
Long jump	55	6.50 (+0.0 m/s)	Gianni Becatti	27/08/1963	Málaga	09/09/2018	World Masters Athletics Championships
Long jump	60	6.18 (+2.0 m/s)	Gianni Becatti	27/08/1963	Pietrasanta	07/09/2024	Meeting Città di Pietrasanta
Long jump	65	5.47 (+0.3 m/s)	Lamberto Boranga	30/10/1942	Ljubljana	27/07/2008	European Masters Athletics Championships
Long jump	70 pre	5.05 (−0.1 m/s)	Lamberto Boranga	30/10/1942	Zittau	19/08/2012	European Masters Athletics Championships
Long jump	70	4.65 i	Giuliano Costantini	17/07/1949	Ancona	10/02/2022	Italian Masters Athletics Championships indoor
Long jump	70	4.64 (−1.6 m/s)	Giuliano Costantini	17/07/1949	Acireale	23/06/2023	Italian Masters Athletics Championships
Long jump	75	4.55 (+0.4 m/s)	Giuliano Costantini	17/07/1949	Misano Adriatico	20/06/2025	Italian Masters Athletics Championships
Long jump	80 pre	3.98 (+1.3 m/s)	Giuseppe Marabotti	15/11/1915	Buffalo	23/07/1995	World Masters Athletics Championships
Long jump	80	3.95 i	Giuseppe Marabotti	15/11/1915	Florence	17/02/1996	Italian Masters Indoor Athletics Championships
Long jump	85 pre	3.58 (±0.0 m/s)	Bruno Sobrero	11/11/1920	Chivasso	03/07/2005	Masters Athletics Clubs Championships Regional
Long jump	85	3.54 i	Giorgio Bortolozzi	04/01/1937	Ancona	10/02/2022	Italian Masters Athletics Championships indoor
Long jump	85	3.50 (+1.0 m/s)	Bruno Sobrero	11/11/1920	Poznań	23/07/2006	European Masters Athletics Championships
Long jump	90	3.07 (±0.0 m/s)	Vittorio Colò	09/11/1911	Milan	28/04/2002	'Ambrosiana Day'
Long jump	95	2.14 (−0.4 m/s)	Giuseppe Ottaviani	20/05/1916	Cosenza	30/09/2011	Italian Masters Athletics Championships
Long jump	100 pre	1.36 i	Giuseppe Ottaviani	20/05/1916	Ancona	27/02/2016	Italian Masters Indoor Athletics Championships
Long jump	100	1.33 (+0.8 m/s)	Giuseppe Ottaviani	20/05/1916	Urbino	30/05/2016	Meeting Ottaviani 'Lo sport è vita'

=== Triple jump ===
Event	Age	Performance	Athlete	Birthdate	Venue	Date	Meet
Triple jump	35 pre	17.73 i	Fabrizio Donato	14/08/1976	Paris	06/03/2011	European Indoor Athletics Championships
Triple jump	35	17.53 (+0.8 m/s)	Fabrizio Donato	14/08/1976	Helsinki	30/06/2012	European Athletics Championships
Triple jump	40	17.32 (+1.1 m/s)	Fabrizio Donato	14/08/1976	Pierre Benite	09/06/2017	Meeting jumps Pierre Benite
Triple jump	45	13.70 ( )	Giorgio Bortolozzi	04/01/1937	Salsomaggiore	22/06/1984	IMITT Masters Athletics Championships
Triple jump	50 pre	13.30 i	Michele Ticò	27/05/1966	Ancona	31/03/2016	European Masters Athletics Championships Indoor
Triple jump	50	13.12 (+1.2 m/s)	Michele Ticò	27/05/1966	Arezzo	10/07/2016	Italian Masters Athletics Championships
Triple jump	55 pre	12.57 i	Giancarlo Ciceri	21/05/1959	Ancona	08/03/2014	Italian Masters Athletics Championships Indoor
Triple jump	55 pre	12.48 (±0.0 m/s)	Alessandro Guazzaloca	07/09/1966	Modena	05/06/2021	Festival BPER
Triple jump	55	12.43 i	Crescenzio Marchetti	24/03/1951	Ancona	03/03/2007	Italian Masters Athletics Championships Indoor
Triple jump	55	12.39 (+1.5 m/s)	Massimo Fiorini	17/06/1958	Siena	06/07/2013	Masters Athletics Clubs Championships Regional
Triple jump	60	12.13 i	Amelio Compri	31/01/1951	Turin	09/03/1985	IMITT Masters Athletics Championships Indoor
Triple jump	60	11.53 (+1.6 m/s)	Fabrizio Finetti	04/10/1960	Rieti	10/09/2021	Italian Masters Athletics Championships
Triple jump	65 pre	11.40 (±0.0 m/s)	Lamberto Boranga	31/10/1942	Riccione	12/09/2007	World Masters Athletics Championships
Triple jump	65	11.37 i	Crescenzio Marchetti	24/03/1951	Ancona	30/03/2016	European Masters Athletics Championships Indoor
Triple jump	65	11.13 (+1.5 m/s)	Crescenzio Marchetti	24/03/1951	Málaga	14/09/2018	World Masters Athletics Championships
Triple jump	70	10.76 (±0.0 m/s)	Crescenzio Marchetti	24/03/1951	Mantua	07/05/2022	Italian Masters Regional Clubs Championships
Triple jump	75 pre	10.13 i	Giuliano Costantini	17/07/1949	Ancona	23/02/2024	Italian Masters Athletics indoor Championships
Triple jump	75	10.11 (−1.6 m/s)	Giuliano Costantini	17/07/1949	Perugia	07/09/2025	Regional Masters Athletics Championships
Triple jump	80	8.29 (±0.0 m/s)	Natale Scaringi	30/04/1941	Colleferro	15/06/2024	Regional Masters Athletics Championships
Triple jump	85	7.65 (±0.0 m/s)	Vittorio Colò	09/11/1911	Milan	15/06/1997	
Triple jump	85	7.65 (+0.2 m/s)	Natale Scaringi	30/04/1941	Latina	13/06/2026	Regional Masters Athletics Championships
Triple jump	90 pre	6.95 i	Vittorio Colò	09/11/1911	Bordeaux	10/03/2001	European Masters Athletics Championships Indoor
Triple jump	90	6.52 i	Vittorio Colò	09/11/1911	San Sebastián	09/03/2003	European Masters Athletics Championships Indoor
Triple jump	90	6.29 (±0.0 m/s)	Vittorio Colò	09/11/1911	Turin	21/06/2003	Italian Masters Athletics Championships
Triple jump	95	4.67 (+1.2 m/s)	Giuseppe Ottaviani	20/05/1916	Montecassiano	15/06/2013	Masters Athletics Clubs Championships Regional
Triple jump	100	3.54 (+0.3 m/s)	Giuseppe Ottaviani	20/05/1916	Urbino	30/05/2016	Meeting Ottaviani 'Lo sport è vita'
*	100	3.55 (+3.2 m/s)	Giuseppe Ottaviani	20/05/1916	Montecassiano	18/06/2016	Masters Athletics Clubs Championships Regional
* Best results without wind detection or with winds above 2 m/s

=== Shot put ===
Event	Age	Performance	Athlete	Birthdate	Venue	Date	Meet
Shot put (7.257)	35	20.17	Alessandro Andrei	03/01/1959	Pistoia	13/09/1995	
Shot put (7.257)	40	19.10	Paolo Dal Soglio	29/07/1970	Savona	10/06/2012	1° Meeting Città di Savona
Shot put (7.257)	45 pre	18.14 i	Paolo Dal Soglio	29/07/1970	Schio	08/01/2015	Trofeo Carla Sport
Shot put (7.257)	45 pre	17.64	Paolo Dal Soglio	29/07/1970	Turin	25/07/2015	Italian Athletics Championships
Shot put (7.257)	45	17.55	Paolo Dal Soglio	29/07/1970	Jesolo	27/09/2015	Italian Clubs Athletics Championships
Shot put (7.257)	50	15.23	Marco Dodoni	05/09/1972	Bolzano	14/05/2023	Regional Clubs Athletics Championships
Shot put (6)	50 pre	16.58	Marco Dodoni	05/09/1972	Bussolengo	19/06/2022	Master Meeting Bussolangeles
Shot put (6)	50	15.98	Marco Dodoni	05/09/1972	San Biagio di Callalta	05/05/2024	Regional Masters Clubs Athletics Championships
Shot put (6)	55	15.98	Giovanni Tubini	09/04/1964	Modena	19/05/2019	Regional Masters Athletics Championships
Shot put (5)	60	16.45	Giovanni Tubini	09/04/1964	Gothenburg	20/08/2024	World Masters Athletics Championships
Shot put (5)	65 pre	13.40	Antonio Maino	23/11/1951	Novara	04/09/2016	Gran Prix Throws
Shot put (5)	65	13.38	Carmelo Rado	04/08/1933	Udine	10/10/1999	Meeting Alpe Adria
Shot put (4)	70	13.98 i	Giuseppe Franco	22/06/1941	Schio	28/01/2012	Trofeo Carla Sport
Shot put (4)	70	13.90	Giuseppe Franco	22/06/1941	Cosenza	02/10/2011	Italian Masters Athletics Championships
Shot put (4)	75	12.86	Carmelo Rado	04/08/1933	Biella	26/10/2008	Provincial Throws Pentathlon
Shot put (3)	80 pre	12.99	Carmelo Rado	04/08/1933	Milan	16/06/2013	Masters Athletics Regional Clubs Championships
Shot put (3)	80	12.86	Carmelo Rado	04/08/1933	Rimini	30/08/2013	Provincial Throws Pentathlon
Shot put (3)	85 pre	10.52	Carmelo Rado	04/08/1933	Mantua	17/06/2018	Masters Athletics Regional Clubs Championships
Shot put (3)	85	10.50	Carmelo Rado	04/08/1933	Ancona	14/09/2018	Regional Throws Pentathlon Championships
Shot put (3)	90	8.94	Carmelo Rado	04/08/1933	Busto Arsizio	25/10/2025	Italian Masters Winter Throws Championships
Shot put (3)	95	6.82	Mario Riboni	13/06/1913	Bressanone	20/06/2008	Italian Masters Athletics Championships
Shot put (3)	100	5.50	Mario Riboni	13/06/1913	Milan	16/06/2013	Masters Athletics Clubs Championships Regional

=== Discus throw ===
Event	Age	Performance	Athlete	Birthdate	Venue	Date	Meet
Discus throw (2)	35	67.36	Giovanni Faloci	13/10/1985	Spoleto	29/06/2021	Discus Throw Meet
Discus throw (2)	40 pre	63.55	Hannes Kirchler	22/12/1978	Tarquinia	13/06/2018	5° Trofeo Silvano Simeon
Discus throw (2)	40	61.37	Diego Fortuna	14/02/1968	Florence	27/06/2008	Italian Athletics Clubs Championships Regional
Discus throw (2)	45	53.47	Diego Fortuna	14/02/1968	Vicenza	28/09/2013	Italian Athletics Clubs Championships
Discus throw (1.5)	50 pre	56.91	Emmanuele Venturelli	26/03/1976	Ancona	07/03/2026	Italian Masters Athletics Championships indoor
Discus throw (1.5)	50	54.92	Carmelo Rado	04/08/1933	Asti	25/06/1984	
Discus throw (1.5)	55 pre	51.58	Carmelo Rado	04/08/1933	Verona	04/07/1988	European Masters Athletics Championships
Discus throw (1.5)	55	49.88	Carmelo Rado	04/08/1933	Cesenatico	16/09/1988	Italian Masters Athletics Championships
Discus throw (1)	60	57.86	Carmelo Rado	04/08/1933	Biella	14/09/1993	
Discus throw (1)	65	54.93	Carmelo Rado	04/08/1933	Cesenatico	11/09/1998	European Masters Athletics Championships
Discus throw (1)	70	55.27	Carmelo Rado	04/08/1933	Chiuro	30/09/2007	Regional Masters Athletics Championships
Discus throw (1)	75	49.21	Carmelo Rado	04/08/1933	Besana Brianza	05/10/2008	Regional Masters Athletics Championships
Discus throw (1)	80 pre	41.45	Carmelo Rado	04/08/1933	Novara	11/05/2013	Trofeo Dellomodarme
Discus throw (1)	80	40.45	Carmelo Rado	04/08/1933	Montecassiano	21/09/2013	Masters Athletics Clubs Championships
Discus throw (1)	85	35.92	Carmelo Rado	04/08/1933	Caorle	13/09/2019	European Masters Athletics Championships
Discus throw (1)	90 pre	28.03	Carmelo Rado	04/08/1933	Mariano Comense	15/04/2023	Italian Masters Winter Throws Pentathlon Championships
Discus throw (1)	90	24.32	Carmelo Rado	04/08/1933	Misano Adriatico	21/06/2025	Italian Masters Athletics Championships
Discus throw (1)	95	17.62	Giuseppe Ottaviani	20/05/1916	San Benedetto del Tronto	21/05/2011	17° Adriatic Grand Prix Meeting
Discus throw (1)	100	10.27	Giuseppe Ottaviani	20/05/1916	Montecassiano	18/06/2016	Masters Athletics Clubs Championships Regional

=== Hammer throw ===
Event	Age	Performance	Athlete	Birthdate	Venue	Date	Meet
Hammer throw (7.257)	35	80.29	Nicola Vizzoni	04/11/1973	Florence	05/06/2011	Italy Cup
Hammer throw (7.257)	40 pre	77.61	Nicola Vizzoni	04/11/1973	Moscow	12/08/2013	World Athletics Championships
Hammer throw (7.257)	40	75.99	Nicola Vizzoni	04/11/1973	Rovereto	20/07/2014	Italian Athletics Championships
Hammer throw (7.257)	45	73.36	Marco Lingua	04/06/1978	Boissano	27/06/2023	Boissano Atletica Estate
Hammer throw (6)	50 pre	61.23	Pellegrino Delli Carri	04/08/1976	Molfetta	20/06/2026	Regional Masters Championships
Hammer throw (6)	50	60.81	Massimo Terreni	29/05/1956	Livorno	14/10/2007	Regional Masters Meeting
Hammer throw (6)	55	56.42	Massimo Terreni	29/05/1956	Pistoia	02/07/2011	Masters Athletics Clubs Championships Regional
Hammer throw (5)	60	57.79	Raffaele Tomaino	22/08/1962	Mondovì	29/08/2024	3° Meeting Regionale Lanci
Hammer throw (5)	60	54.32	Raffaele Tomaino	22/08/1962	Gothenburg	18/08/2024	World Masters Athletics Championships
Hammer throw (5)	65 pre	49.41	Carmelo Rado	04/08/1933	Viareggio	20/06/1998	Italian Masters Athletics Championships
Hammer throw (5)	65	49.10	Carmelo Rado	04/08/1933	Formia	19/06/1999	Italian Masters Athletics Championships
Hammer throw (4)	70	49.85	Carmelo Rado	04/08/1933	Macerata	12/10/2003	Italian Masters Weight Pentathlon Championships
Hammer throw (4)	75	44.93	Carmelo Rado	04/08/1933	Biella	26/10/2008	Provincial Throws Pentathlon
Hammer throw (3)	80 pre	46.04	Carmelo Rado	04/08/1933	Forlì	07/04/2013	Italian Masters Winter Weight Pentathlon Championships
Hammer throw (3)	80	44.69	Carmelo Rado	04/08/1933	Santhià	13/07/2014	3°Challenge Masters Missoni/De Matteis
Hammer throw (3)	85	38.93	Carmelo Rado	04/08/1933	Modena	30/09/2018	Italian Masters Clubs Championships
Hammer throw (3)	90	26.01	Carmelo Rado	04/08/1933	Busto Arsizio	25/10/2025	Italian Masters Throws Pentathlon Championships
Hammer throw (3)	95 pre	16.95	Giuseppe Rovelli	23/11/1918	Mestre	08/06/2013	Regional Masters Throws Pentathlon Championship
Hammer throw (3)	95	16.72	Mario Riboni	13/06/1913	Bressanone	19/06/2008	Italian Masters Athletics Championships
Hammer throw (3)	100	3.63	Giuseppe Ottaviani	20/05/1916	Fano	20/05/2017	Throws Pentathlon Meeting

=== Javelin throw ===
Event	Age	Performance	Athlete	Birthdate	Venue	Date	Meet
Javelin throw (800)	35 pre	79.78	Roberto Bertolini	10/09/1985	Castiglione della Pescaia	25/07/2020	International Meeting
Javelin throw (800)	35	77.67	Roberto Bertolini	10/09/1985	Molfetta	25/09/2020	Meeting Nazionale Città di Molfetta
Javelin throw (800)	40	64.90	Moreno Belletti	10/08/1970	Castelnovo Monti	04/06/2013	Meeting dell'Appennino
Javelin throw (800)	45	65.16	Vanni Rodeghiero	09/02/1942	Cittadella	07/05/1988	
Javelin throw (800)	50	66.08	Carlo Sonego	20/02/1972	Treviso	14/04/2024	Atletica Triveneta Meeting
Javelin throw (700)	50	66.97	Carlo Sonego	20/02/1972	Trieste	03/04/2022	Trofeo Hovhannessian
Javelin throw (700)	55	55.47	Federico Battistutta	18/01/1966	Ancona	12/03/2023	Italian Masters Winter Throws Championships
Javelin throw (600)	60	54.10	Vanni Rodeghiero	09/02/1942	Marghera	22/06/2002	
Javelin throw (600)	65	44.18	Fabio Diotallevi	08/03/1952	Arezzo	29/06/2018	Italian Masters Athletics Championships
Javelin throw (600 old)	65	45.76	Herrmann Visenteiner	03/10/1930	Bolzano	03/10/1997	
Javelin throw (500)	70	40.73	Luigi Brolo	26/01/1938	Ljubljana	31/07/2008	European Masters Athletics Championships
Javelin throw (500)	75	39.80	Virgilio Colombo	16/10/1927	Formia	20/10/2002	Italian Masters Throws Pentathlon Championships
Javelin throw (400)	80 pre	33.02	Virgilio Colombo	16/10/1927	Novara	29/04/2007	Trofeo Dellomodarme
Javelin throw (400)	80	31.28	Virgilio Colombo	16/10/1927	Novara	28/06/2009	Trofeo Dellomodarme
Javelin throw (400)	85	23.85	Luigi Brolo	26/01/1938	Lodi	14/09/2024	Regional Masters Championships
Javelin throw (400)	90 pre	18.93	Giovanni Pertile	14/09/1916	Misano Adriatico	10/06/2006	Italian Masters Athletics Championships
Javelin throw (400)	90	18.50	Giovanni Pertile	14/09/1916	Vicenza	07/06/2008	Masters Athletics Clubs Championships Regional
Javelin throw (400)	95	14.21	Giuseppe Ottaviani	20/05/1916	Macerata	17/09/2011	Gran Prix Throws Pentathlon
Javelin throw (400)	100	4.95	Giuseppe Ottaviani	20/05/1916	Fano	20/05/2017	Throws Pentathlon Meeting

=== Weight throw ===
Event	Age	Performance	Athlete	Birthdate	Venue	Date	Meet
Weight throw (15.88)	35	23.94	Nicola Vizzoni	04/11/1973	Pietrasanta	17/04/2009	
Weight throw (15.88)	40	20.93	Marco Lingua	04/06/1978	Santhià	25/07/2021	Regional Masters Throws Pentathlon
Weight throw (15.88)	45	18.03	Pellegrino Delli Carri	04/08/1976	Pescara	26/09/2023	European Masters Championships
Weight throw (11.34)	50 pre	22.08	Pellegrino Delli Carri	04/08/1976	Brescia	19/07/2026	Provincial Masters Championships
Weight throw (11.34)	50	20.75	Pellegrino Delli Carri	04/08/1976	Verona	04/10/2026	Regional Throws Pentathlon Championships
Weight throw (11.34)	55	19.72	Massimo Terreni	29/05/1956	Livorno	02/06/2011	
Weight throw (9.08)	60	20.51	Raffaele Tomaino	22/08/1962	Busto Arsizio	26/10/2025	Italian Masters Championships Throws Pentathlon
Weight throw (9.08)	65	17.00	Carmelo Rado	04/08/1933	Cesenatico	18/09/1998	European Masters Athletics Championships
Weight throw (7.26)	70	18.57	Carmelo Rado	04/08/1933	Udine	05/10/2003	Meeting Alpe Adria
Weight throw (7.26)	75	17.80	Carmelo Rado	04/08/1933	Biella	26/10/2008	Provincial Throws Pentathlon
Weight throw (5.45)	80	19.91	Carmelo Rado	04/08/1933	Rimini	30/08/2013	Provincial Throws Pentathlon
Weight throw (5.45)	85	16.65	Carmelo Rado	04/08/1933	Ancona	14/09/2018	Regional Throws Pentathlon Championships
Weight throw (5.45)	90	11.02	Carmelo Rado	04/08/1933	Santhià	30/06/2024	Regional Masters Weight throw Championship
Weight throw (5.45)	95 pre	6.56	Giuseppe Rovelli	23/11/1918	Mestre	08/06/2013	Regional Masters Throws Pentathlon Athletics Championship
Weight throw (5.45)	95	6.21	Mario Riboni	13/06/1913	Bressanone	21/06/2008	Italian Masters Athletics Championships
Weight throw (5.45)	100	4.92	Giuseppe Ottaviani	20/05/1916	Urbino	30/05/2016	Meeting Ottaviani 'Lo sport è vita'

=== Pentathlon ===
Event	Age	Performance	Athlete	Birthdate	Venue	Date	Meet
Pentathlon: Long jump - Javelin throw - 200 m - Discus throw - 1500 m
Pentathlon	35	2.815	Michele Pepino	17/08/1974	Asti	09/10/2011	Festival Multiple Events
6.32-Javelin (800) 33.31-23.98-Discus (2) 25.37-4:46.6 702-352-725-381-655
Pentathlon	40	3.490	Hubert Indra	24/03/1957	Cesenatico	14/09/1998	European Masters Athletics Championships
6.12-Javelin (800) 49.58-24.00-Discus (2) 35.22-4:55.56 736-646-796-640-672
Pentathlon	45	2.888	Gianluca Camaschella	12/03/1971	Asti	08/10/2017	Festival Multiple Events
5.48 (-0.2)-Javelin (800) 22.34-26.55 (0.3)-Discus (2) 29.87-4:45.26 657-370-647-404-810
Pentathlon	50	3.164	Fabio Nicola	08/01/1966	Asti	02/10/2016	Festival Multiple Events
5.33 (0.2)-Javelin (700) 39.56-27.5 (-0.9)-Discus (1.5) 32.61-5:10.8 707-567-624-530-736
Pentathlon	55	3.101	Giancarlo Ballico	28/07/1959	Santhia	05/10/2014	Gran Prix Multiple Events
4.54 (-0.1)- Javelin (700) 44.90-28.3 (0.4)- Discus (1.5) 39.32-6:33.2 576-739-637-739-410
Pentathlon	60	3.115	Sergio Valente	18/04/1939	Ostia	09/09/2001	Italian Multiple Events Masters Championships
4.52-Javelin (600) 31.18-26.94- Discus (1) 26.90-5:54.3 666-502-838-437-672
Pentathlon	65	3.162	Renato Pordon	13/12/1933	Ostia	10/06/2000	Italian Multiple Events Masters Championships
4.61- Javelin (600) 31.82-28.6- Discus (1) 24.87-6:42.2 814-584-776-444-544
Pentathlon	70	3.261	Umberto Benevenia	06/03/1940	Bastia Umbra	28/05/2011	Italian Multiple Events Masters Championships
4.14 (1.6)- Javelin (500) 35.83-34.34 (-1.7)- Discus (1) 32.86-7:08.9 771-741-505-705-539
Pentathlon	75	3.201	Vittorio Colo'	09/11/1911	Verona	30/06/1988	European Masters Athletics Championships
3.86-Javelin (600) 24.54-31.7- Discus (1) 25.02-8:02.0 802-566-781-581-471
Pentathlon	80 pre	3.210	Ernesto Minopoli	23/09/1933	Gorizia	08/06/2013	Italian Multiple Events Masters Championships
3.40 (1.2)-Javelin (400) 22.19-34.48 (0.2)- Discus (1) 21.13-8:19.70 755-537-776-558-584
Pentathlon	80	2.971	Vittorio Colo'	09/11/1911	Kristiansand	01/07/1992	European Masters Athletics Championships
3.48 (-0.2)-Javelin (400) 21.38-34.48 ( )- Discus (1) 14.32-8:44.9 792-567-776-339-499
Pentathlon	85	2.403	Bruno Sobrero	11/11/1920	Ljubljana	30/07/2008	European Masters Athletics Championships
3.04 (0.1)- Javelin (400) 15.22-37.84 (-0.9)- Discus (1) 17.13-Rit 750-326-795-532-000
All results were compared to the new Master 2010 scoreboard with the New Age Factors Table Combined Events 2010 in force in Italy since 1 January

=== Decathlon ===
Event	Age	Performance	Athlete	Birthdate	Venue	Date	Meet
Decathlon: 100 m - Long jump - Shot put - High jump - 400 m - 110hs/100hs/80hs - Discus - Pole vault - Javelin - 1500 m
Decathlon	35	6.966 7029old	Luciano Asta	12/01/1969	Ostia	12/09/2004	Italian Multiple Events Clubs Championships
11.70 (0.6)-6.79 (1.0)-Shot put (7.260) 13.08-1.88-54.43-110hs106 16.36 (-1.9)-Discus (2) 42.24-4.30-Javelin (800) 49.15- 4:57.64; 711 826 709 714 661 711* 710 716 608 600 *h.1,06
Decathlon	40	7.177 7270old	Hubert Indra	24/03/1957	Durban	17/07/1997	World Masters Championships
12.42 (-2.1)-6.41 (+0.5)-Shot put (7.260) 12.28-1.87-55.02-110hs100 15.80 (0.2)-Discus (2) 36.78-4.20-Javelin (800) 49.40-5:00.80; 649 821 708 785 709 827 613 757 669 639
Decathlon	45	7.305 7443old	Hubert Indra	24/03/1957	Lana	28/04/2002	
12.20 (+2.0)-5.74 ()- Shot put (7.260) 11.70-1.75-56"46-110hs106 17"22 (+0.2)- Discus (2) 35.35-4.10-Javelin (800) 48.02-5:01.41; 771 734 721 758 725 754* 632 804 710 696 *h.1,06
Decathlon	50	7.486 7603old	Hubert Indra	24/03/1957	Milan	30/06/2007	Italian Masters Athletics Championships
13.04 (-2.6)-5.25 (0.3)-Shot put (6) 12.76-1.75-58.83-100hs091 15.74 (-0.4)-Discus (1.5) 40.44-4.00-Javelin (700) 47.80-5:12.73; 695 686 773 850 706 824 680 856 719 697
Decathlon	55	7.131 7283old	Hubert Indra	24/03/1957	Gorizia	09/06/2013	Italian Multiple Events Masters Championships
13.68 (-0.6)-5.00 (-0.1)-Shot put (6) 11.56-1.69-1:03.26-100hs091 16.47 (0.2)-Discus (1.5) 35.12-3.80-Javelin (700) 41.57-6:01.01; 663 702 750 878 619 824 628 877 675 515
Decathlon	60	7.801 8202old	Hubert Indra	23/03/1957	Arezzo	03/06/2018	Italian Multiple Events Masters Championships
14.31 (0.0)-4.54 (0.4)-Shot put (5) 11.58-1.66-1:02.19-100hs084 15.60 (1.3)-Discus (1) 41.19-3.80-Javelin (600) 41.16-5:42.63; 755 743 739 944 734 879 660 985 682 680
Decathlon	65	7.563	Marco Mastrolorenzi	27/12/1960	Rieti	19/04/2026	Regional Multiple Events Masters Championships
13.74 (0.5)-5.11 (1.4)-Shot put (5) 10.65-1.65-1:06.46-100hs084 16.52 ( )-Discus (1) 26.15-3.60-Javelin (600) 34.25 - 6:54.78; 819 947 739 1041 661 874 419 1016 618 429
Decathlon	70	5.194	Andrea Delledonne	19/01/1949	Campi Bisenzio	28/05/2023	Italian Multiple Events Masters Championships
14.26 (1.3) -3.97 (3.0) - Shot put (4) 9.23 - 1.18 -1:12.06 - 80hs076 15.95 (-0.2) -Discus (1) 22.60- 1.90 -Javelin (500)18.39 - 7:06.38; 814 644 608 544 472 603 397 369 280 463
Decathlon	75	5.671	Andrea Delledonne	19/01/1949	Vercelli	28/04/2024	Italian Multiple Events Masters Championships
14.64 (2.3) - 4.02 (-0.1) - Shot put (4) 9.13 - 1.18 -1:20.13 - 80hs076 17.55 (-0.2) -Discus (1) 20.00- 1.80 -Javelin (500)20.33 - 6:49.90; 836 767 675 627 426 548 394 393 385 620
Decathlon	80 pre	5.368	Vincenzo La Camera	04/12/1946	Misano Adriatico	24/05/2026	Italian Multiple Events Masters Championships
15.37 (-0.1) - 3.36 (+2.9) - Shot put (3) 7.89 - 1.15 - 1:32.74 - 80hs068 15.61 (+2.1) - Discus (1) 14.42 - 1.80 - Javelin (400) 15.84 - 7:46.87; 806 628 543 670 269 890 305 469 287 501
Decathlon	80	4.650 5681old	Ernesto Minopoli	23/09/1933	Desenzano del Garda	25/05/2014	Italian Multiple Events Masters Championships
17.33 (0.2)-2.94 (2.3)-Shot put (3) 8.50-1.09-1:34.04-80hs068 18.94 (0.0)-Discus (1) 18.06-2.00-Javelin (400) 20.37-8:48.22; 522 465 594 593 244 544 411 570 406 301
Decathlon	85	4.688 5917old	Vittorio Colo'	09/11/1911	Durban	17/07/1997	World Masters Championships
17.37 (-1.9)-3.19 (1.6)-Shot put (4) 6.73-0.91-1:39.58-80hs076 20.13 (0.0)-Discus (1) 16.90-1.00-Javelin (600) 16.98-9:23.24; 637 718 536* 434 307 616 462 169 468* 341
All results were compared to the new Master 2023 scoreboard with the New Age Factors Table Combined Events 2023 in force in Italy since 1 January

=== Pentathlon throws ===
Event	Age	Performance	Athlete	Birthdate	Venue	Date	Meet
Pentathlon throws	35	3.812 3.832old	Marco Lingua	04/06/1978	Santhia	15/02/2015	Regional winter throws Pentathlon Masters Championships
Hammer (7.260) 70.55 - Shot put (7.260) 14.08 - Discus (2) 40.43 - Javelin (800) 29.14 - Weight (15.880) 19.80 / 1049 773 673 305 1012
Pentathlon throws	40	3.200 3.271old	Fabio Caldon	12/08/1975	Vicenza	03/07/2016	Regional Throws Pentathlon Championships
Hammer (7.260) 42.29 - Shot put (7.260) 10.50 - Discus (2) 35.83 - Javelin (800) 58.11 - Weight (15.880) 11.71 / 611 587 594 816 592
Pentathlon throws	45	3.736	Pellegrino Delli Carri	04/08/1976	Bari	22/10/2023	Italian winter Throws Pentathlon Masters Championships
Hammer (7.260) 56.88 - Shot put (7.260) 10.99 - Discus (2) 38.14 - Javelin (800) 30.75 - Weight (15.880) 17.78 / 932 670 693 402 1039
Pentathlon throws	50	3.730	Pellegrino Delli Carri	04/08/1976	Verona	04/10/2026	Regional Throws Pentathlon Masters Championships
Hammer (6) 57.67 - Shot put (6) 11.43 - Discus (1.5) 39.42 - Javelin (700) 30.60 - Weight (11.340) 20.75 / 920 679 659 408 1064
Pentathlon throws	55	3.890 4.055old	Andrea Meneghin	08/08/1958	Mestre	17/05/2014	Regional Throws Pentathlon Masters Championships
Hammer (6) 44.02 - Shot put (6) 13.48 - Discus (1.5) 40.88 - Javelin (700) 36.81 - Weight (11.340) 17.07 / 735 897 755 580 923
Pentathlon throws	60	4126	Giovanni Tubini	09/04/1964	Verona	12/10/2025	Regional Throws Pentathlon Masters Championships
Hammer (5) 49.46 - Shot put (5) 15.68 - Discus (1) 43.03 - Javelin (600) 38.65 - Weight (9.080) 17.97 / 836 1050 696 631 913
Pentathlon throws	65	4.275 4.567old	Carmelo Rado	04/08/1933	Cesenatico	18/09/1998	European Masters Athletics Championships
Hammer (5) 44.96 - Shot put (5) 12.33 - Discus (1) 50.19 - Javelin (600) 37.54 - Weight (9.080) 17.00 / 835 877 936 693 934
Pentathlon throws	70	4.152 4.507old	Carmelo Rado	04/08/1933	Macerata	12/10/2003	Italian Throws Pentathlon Masters Championships
Hammer (4) 49.85 - Shot put (4) 13.11 - Discus (1) 35.96 - Javelin (500) 39.42 - Weight (7.260) 16.25 / 934 919 710 758 831
Pentathlon throws	75	4.805 5.182old	Carmelo Rado	04/08/1933	Biella	26/10/2008	Provincial Throws Pentathlon
Hammer (4) 44.93 - Shot put (4) 12.86 - Discus (1) 43.77 - Javelin (500)35.90 - Weight (7.260) 17.80 / 950 1005 1034 793 1023
Pentathlon throws	80 pre	4.546 5.443old	Carmelo Rado	04/08/1933	Forlì	07/04/2013	Italian winter Throws Pentathlon Masters Championships
Hammer (3) 46.04 - Shot put (3) 12.07 - Discus (1) 37.35 - Javelin (400) 28.84 - Weight (5.450) 19.25 / 969 898 1005 634 1040
Pentathlon throws	80	4.425 5.355old	Carmelo Rado	04/08/1933	Aosta	08/09/2013	Gran Prix Throws Pentathlon
Hammer (3) 38.08 - Shot put (3) 12.49 - Discus (1) 39.46 - Javelin (400) 30.60 - Weight (5.450) 17.92 / 778 934 1072 682 959
Pentathlon throws	85	4.402 5.242old	Carmelo Rado	04/08/1933	Ancona	14/09/2018	Gran Prix Throws Pentathlon
Hammer (3) 38.35 - Shot put (3) 10.50 - Discus (1) 30.72 - Javelin (400) 22.98 - Weight (5.450) 16.65 / 944 879 960 593 1026
Pentathlon throws	90	3.468	Carmelo Rado	04/08/1933	Busto Arsizio	25/10/2025	Italian Masters Throws Pentathlon Championships
Hammer (3) 26.01 - Shot put (3) 8.94 - Discus (1) 22.84 - Javelin (400) 16.12 - Weight (5.450) 7.94 / 752 855 844 493 524
Pentathlon throws	95	3.026 3.750old	Giuseppe Ottaviani	20/05/1916	Macerata	17/09/2011	Italian Throws Pentathlon Masters Championships
Hammer (3) 14.19 - Shot put (3) 6.08 - Discus (1) 17.53 - Javelin (400) 14.21 - Weight (5.450) 6.05 / 484 654 815 582 491
Pentathlon throws	100	1.532 2.533old	Giuseppe Ottaviani	20/05/1916	Fano	20/05/2017	Throws Pentathlon Meeting
Hammer (3) 3.63 - Shot put (3) 3.17 - Discus (1) 7.13 - Javelin (400) 4.95 - Weight (5.450) 4.21 / 106 368 392 211 455
All results were compared to the new Master 2023 scoreboard with the New Age Factors Table Combined Events, which has been in force since 1 January.

=== Race walk 3000 m ===
Event	Age	Performance	Athlete	Birthdate	Venue	Date	Meet
Race walk 3000 m	35	11:05.0+	Maurizio Damilano	06/04/1957	Caserta	11/06/1992	
Race walk 3000 m	35	11:35.34	Giovanni De Benedictis	08/04/1968	Castelfidardo	06/09/2003	Memorial Criminesi
Race walk 3000 m	40	11:43:04	Alex Schwazer	26/12/1984	Bolzano	17/05/2025	Regional Masters Clubs Championship
Race walk 3000 m	45 pre	12:49:6	Vincenzo Magliulo	16/11/1976	Avellino	18/04/2021	Regional Championship
Race walk 3000 m	45	13:30:19	Antonio Lopetuso	29/10/1958	Bari	22/10/2006	Meeting Città di Bari
Race walk 3000 m	50	13:33.9	Fabio Ruzzier	21/01/1953	Trieste	10/05/2006	
Race walk 3000 m	55	13:41.78	Graziano Morotti	15/01/1951	Chiuro	06/09/2008	Creval Meeting
Race walk 3000 m	60	13:15.11	Graziano Morotti	15/01/1951	Milan	25/05/2011	Trofeo Milano
Race walk 3000 m	65	15:21.57	Antonio Lopetuso	29/10/1958	Molfetta	20/06/2026	Regional Masters Championships
Race walk 3000 m	70 pre	15:51.91	Alberto Pio	10/05/1952	Beinasco	07/05/2022	Regional Masters Clubs Championships
Race walk 3000 m	70	16:34.6+	Ettorino Formentin	22/03/1947	Aarhus	31/07/2017	European Masters Athletics Championships
Race walk 3000 m	75	17:56.0	Francesco Scimone	17/11/1911	Catania	11/07/1987	
Race walk 3000 m	80	17:30.2	Romolo Pelliccia	19/09/1936	Viterbo	14/10/2018	Trofeo Fulvio Villa
Race walk 3000 m	80	19:27.2	Francesco Scimone	17/11/1911	Catania	22/08/1992	
Race walk 3000 m	85	22:45.83	Nazzareno Proietti	14/08/1933	Viterbo	12/10/2019	Trofeo Lazio
Race walk 3000 m	90 pre	23:10.95	Romolo Pelliccia	19/09/1936	Colleferro	13/09/2026	Trofeo Fulvio Villa
Race walk 3000 m	90	25:59.44	Nazzareno Proietti	14/08/1933	Colleferro	15/06/2024	Regional Masters Championships

=== Race walk 5000 m ===
Event	Age	Performance	Athlete	Birthdate	Venue	Date	Meet
Race walk 5000 m	35	18:30.43	Maurizio Damilano	06/04/1957	Caserta	11/06/1992	
Race walk 5000 m	40	21:11.2	Vittorio Visini	25/05/1945	Cesenatico	17/09/1988	Italian Masters Athletics Championships
Race walk 5000 m	40	19:54:9h(+)	Alex Schwazer	26/12/1984	San Biagio di Callalta	10/05/2025	Regional Clubs Championship
Race walk 5000 m	45	20:54.51	Walter Arena	30/05/1964	Misterbianco	06/07/2013	Gran Prix del Sole
Race walk 5000 m	50 pre	21:21.9	Walter Arena	30/05/1964	Misterbianco	02/03/2014	Meeting Open
Race walk 5000 m	50	22:01.28	Walter Arena	30/05/1964	Misterbianco	30/05/2014	Provincial Athletics Championships
Race walk 5000 m	55	22:35.38	Graziano Morotti	15/01/1951	Milan	30/06/2007	Italian Masters Athletics Championships
Race walk 5000 m	60	23:04.61	Graziano Morotti	15/01/1951	Orvieto	24/09/2011	Italian Athletics Clubs Championships
Race walk 5000 m	65	25:02.43	Guido Battistin	26/04/1948	Rovigo	07/09/2013	Regional Athletics Championships
Race walk 5000 m	70	27:01.02	Ettorino Formentin	22/03/1947	Salò	30/09/2017	Trofeo delle Regioni
Race walk 5000 m	75	27:50.2	Carlo Bomba	13/09/1921	Pomezia	27/09/1997	
Race walk 5000 m	80	29:29.90	Romolo Pelliccia	19/09/1936	Orvieto	08/07/2017	Italian Masters Athletics Championships
Race walk 5000 m		28:03.34	Romolo Pelliccia	19/09/1936	Orvieto	20/07/2018	Trofeo Città di Orvieto
Race walk 5000 m	85 pre	32:26.21	Romolo Pelliccia	19/09/1936	Orvieto	15/05/2021	Meeting Orvieto
Race walk 5000 m	85	33:53.32	Romolo Pelliccia	19/09/1936	Perugia	06/05/2023	Regional Athletics Clubs Championships
Race walk 5000 m	85	32:58.84	Romolo Pelliccia	19/09/1936	Foligno	02/07/2023	Libertas Athletics Championships
Race walk 5000 m	90	39:06.33	Romolo Pelliccia	19/09/1936	Campi Bisenzio	19/09/2026	Italian Masters Athletics Championships
Race walk 5000 m	90 pre	42:20.97	Rodolfo Crasso	30/07/1914	Caorle	19/06/2004	Italian Masters Athletics Championships
Race walk 5000 m	90	44:00.57	Andrea Abbiati	23/06/1935	Madeira	10/10/2025	European Masters Championships

=== Race walk 10,000 m ===
Event	Age	Performance	Athlete	Birthdate	Venue	Date	Meet
Race walk 10,000 m	35	39:41.4	Maurizio Damilano	06/04/1957	Turin	23/05/1992	
Race walk 10,000 m	40	38:24.07	Alex Schwazer	26/12/1984	Bolzano	06/09/2025	Regional Championship
Race walk 10,000 m	45	43:32.70	Antonio Lopetuso	29/10/1958	Molfetta	12/09/2004	Regional Athletics Championships
Race walk 10,000 m	50	44:48.0	Fabio Ruzzier	21/01/1953	Udine	16/04/2005	Regional meeting
Race walk 10,000 m	55	45:38.95	Graziano Morotti	15/01/1951	Trento	20/05/2006	Italian Athletics Clubs Championships Regional
Race walk 10,000 m	60	47:20.89	Graziano Morotti	15/01/1951	Borgo Valsugana	14/05/2011	Italian Athletics Clubs Championships Regional
Race walk 10,000 m	65	48:41.8	Carlo Bomba	13/09/1921	Viterbo	20/06/1987	
Race walk 10,000 m	70	54:23.72	Ettorino Formentin	22/03/1947	Bolzano	06/05/2017	Italian Athletics Clubs Championships Regional
Race walk 10,000 m	75	1:00:58.0	Carlo Bomba	13/09/1921	Pomezia	07/06/1997	
Race walk 10,000 m	80	58:47.97	Romolo Pelliccia	19/09/1936	Orvieto	23/04/2017	Walk Clubs Championships Regional

=== Race walk 10 km ===
Event	Age	Performance	Athlete	Birthdate	Venue	Date	Meet
Race walk Km 10 road	35	41:20	Sandro Bellucci	21/02/1955	Saluzzo	30/09/1990	
Race walk Km 10 road	35	41:21	Giorgio Rubino	15/04/1986	Rovereto	25/06/2021	Italian Athletics Championships
Race walk Km 10 road	40	44:08	Roberto Defendenti	30/05/1968	Anzola dell'Emilia	29/05/2011	Trofeo Frigerio
Race walk Km 10 road	45	44:44	Roberto Defendenti	30/05/1968	Rovereto	18/07/2014	Italian Athletics Championships
Race walk Km 10 road	50	44:32.1	Roberto Defendenti	30/05/1964	Scanzorosciate	31/03/2019	Trofeo Frigerio
Race walk Km 10 road	55	46:32	Graziano Morotti	15/01/1951	Grottammare	24/10/2010	Grand Prix Walk
Race walk Km 10 road	60	49:33.13	Graziano Morotti	15/01/1951	Sacramento	12/07/2011	World Masters Athletics Championships
Race walk Km 10 road	65	53:00	Ettorino Formentin	22/03/1947	Lyon	09/08/2015	World Masters Athletics Championships
Race walk Km 10 road	70	56:23	Romolo Pelliccia	19/09/1936	Misano	10/09/2017	World Masters Athletics Championships
Race walk Km 10 road	75	1h01:18	Romolo Pelliccia	19/09/1936	Lyon	09/08/2015	World Masters Athletics Championships
Race walk Km 10 road	80	59:55	Romolo Pelliccia	19/09/1936	Reggio Emilia	21/10/2018	Walk Clubs Masters Championships
Race walk Km 10 road	85	1h09:58	Romolo Pelliccia	19/09/1936	Grottammare	16/10/2022	Walk Clubs Masters Championships
Race walk Km 10 road	85	1h12:12	Romolo Pelliccia	19/09/1936	Pescara	26/09/2023	European Masters Championships
Race walk Km 10 road	90	1h37:40	Nazzareno Proietti	14/08/1933	Pescara	26/09/2023	European Masters Championships
The records of this specialty have been drawn up for the first time in 2016 on the basis of results in the FIDAL archive. starting in 2008. Any other better performance than the ones included should be reported to the statistical office.

=== Race walk 20 km ===
Event	Age	Performance	Athlete	Birthdate	Venue	Date	Meet
Race walk Km 20 road	35	1:18:54	Maurizio Damilano	06/04/1957	A Coruña	11/06/1992	Gran Premio de los Cantones
Race walk Km 20 road	40	1:28:26	Fabio Ruzzier	21/01/1953	Zürich	10/04/1993	
Race walk Km 20 road	45 pre	1:28:09	Abdon Pamich	03/10/1933	Viareggio	15/09/1978	European Masters Athletics Championships
Race walk Km 20 road	45	1:32:47	Roberto Defendenti	30/05/1968	Cassino	29/03/2015	Walk 20 km Italian Athletics Championships
Race walk Km 20 road	50	1:34:02	Graziano Morotti	15/01/1951	San Giovanni in Marignano	29/05/2004	World Masters Athletics Championships
Race walk Km 20 road	55	1:33:38	Graziano Morotti	15/01/1951	Lugano	02/04/2006	Memorial Mario Albisetti
Race walk Km 20 road	60	1:38:49	Graziano Morotti	15/01/1951	Chiasso	02/10/2011	'Chiasso in Marcia'
Race walk Km 20 road	65	1:48:32	Carlo Bomba	13/09/1921	Cagliari	11/10/1987	IMITT Masters Athletics Championships
Race walk Km 20 road	70	1:59:06	Vincenzo Menafro	02/06/1935	Piacenza	02/10/2005	Walk 20 km Italian Masters Athletics Championships
Race walk Km 20 road	75	2:06:40	Giulio De Petra	07/12/1910	Cagliari	11/10/1987	IMITT Masters Athletics Championships
Race walk Km 20 road	80	2:06:12	Romolo Pelliccia	19/09/1936	Grosseto	28/01/2018	Walk 20 km Italian Masters Athletics Championships
Race walk Km 20 road	85	2:58:39	Lino Tadei	09/07/1921	Ljubljana	31/07/2008	European Masters Athletics Championships

=== Race walk 30 km ===
Event	Age	Performance	Athlete	Birthdate	Venue	Date	Meet
Race walk Km 30 road	35	2:01:44	Maurizio Damilano	06/04/1957	Cuneo	03/10/1992	
Race walk Km 30 road	40	2:18:09 (*)	Marco De Luca	12/05/1981	Poděbrady	16/05/2021	European Cup Race Walk
Race walk Km 30 road	40	2:20:35 (*)	Fabio Ruzzier	21/01/1953	Lugano	14/03/1993	
Race walk Km 30 road	45 pre	2:22:11	Abdon Pamich	03/10/1933	Rome	04/09/1978	
Race walk Km 30 road	50 pre	2:26:15	Roberto Cervi	26/07/1952	Vittorio Veneto	03/03/2002	Walk 30 km Italian Masters Athletics Championships
Race walk Km 30 road	55	2:29:34	Graziano Morotti	15/01/1951	Maranello	08/10/2006	Walk 30 km Italian Masters Athletics Championships
Race walk Km 30 road	60	2:36:47 (**)	Graziano Morotti	15/01/1951	Latina	29/01/2012	Trofeo Fulvio Villa
Race walk Km 30 road	65	3:03:00	Vincenzo Menafro	02/06/1935	Riccione	26/05/2002	Non Stadia World Masters Championships
Race walk Km 30 road	70	3:14:32	Carlo Bomba	13/09/1921	Mira	05/10/1991	Non Stadia European Masters Championships
Race walk Km 30 road	75	3:31:36	Angelo Arena	19/03/1929	Bruges	26/06/1999	Non Stadia World Masters Championships
Race walk Km 30 road	80	3:48:43	Luigi Biggi	23/02/1910	Mira	05/10/1991	Non Stadia European Masters Championships
(*) time of passage of the Event 50 km
(**) time of passage of the Event 35 km

=== Race walk 50 km ===
Event	Age	Performance	Athlete	Birthdate	Venue	Date	Meet
Race walk Km 50 road	35 pre	3:44:47	Marco De Luca	12/05/1981	Rome	08/05/2016	World Cup Race Walk
Race walk Km 50 road	35	3:45:02	Marco De Luca	12/05/1981	London	13/08/2017	Olympic Games
Race walk Km 50 road	40	3:50:48	Marco De Luca	12/05/1981	Poděbrady	16/05/2021	European Cup Race Walk
Race walk Km 50 road	40	4:06:38	Fabio Ruzzier	21/01/1953	Alife	21/02/1993	Walk 50 km Italian Athletics Championships
Race walk Km 50 road	45	4:27:37	Roberto Cervi	26/07/1952	Piacenza	05/10/1999	Walk 50 km Italian Athletics Championships
Race walk Km 50 road	50	4:22:02	Fabio Ruzzier	21/01/1953	Augusta	30/01/2005	Walk 50 km Italian Athletics Championships
Race walk Km 50 road	55	4:23:34	Graziano Morotti	15/01/1951	Rosignano	11/02/2007	Walk 50 km Italian Athletics Championships

== Women ==
Legend

Current world record

Awaiting ratification

"pre" is a record performance obtained before the actual age censorship, as provided by the international federation W.M.A.

=== 100 m F ===
Event	Age	Performance	Athlete	Birthdate	Venue	Date	Meet
100 m	35	11.73 (+0.4 m/s)	Manuela Levorato	16/03/1977	Modena	22/09/2012	Italian Athletics Clubs Championships
100 m	40	11.99 (+1.7 m/s)	Daniela Lai	15/01/1979	Brescia	04/06/2023	Meeting della Leonessa
100 m	45 pre	12.12 (+1.8 m/s)	Silvia Di Domenico	10/11/1981	Nocera Inferiore	05/07/2026	Regional Masters Championships Throws pentathlon
100 m	45	12.15 (+0.5 m/s)	Daniela Lai	15/01/1979	Sassari	03/05/2025	Regional Masters Championships
100 m	50	12.85 (+1.3 m/s)	Cristina Sanulli	21/11/1972	Sestriere	06/08/2023	3° High Speed League
100 m	55	13.04 (+1.6 m/s)	Miriam Di Iorio	26/08/1966	Grosseto	11/06/2022	Italian Masters Athletics Championships
100 m	60	13.62 (±0.0 m/s)	Miriam Di Iorio	26/08/1966	Macerata	29/08/2026	Meeting San Giuliano
100 m	65	14.81 (+1.4 m/s)	Loredana Turreni	09/01/1959	Colleferro	15/06/2024	Regional Masters Championships
100 m	70	15.23 (±0.0 m/s)	Mariuccia Quilleri	02/06/1953	Monselice	03/06/2022	Regional Masters Athletics Championships
100 m	75 pre	16.88 (−1.0 m/s)	Maria Grazia Rafti	10/12/1951	Latina	13/06/2026	Regional Masters Athletics Championships
100 m	75	17.18 (+1.2 m/s)	Emma Mazzenga	01/08/1933	Formia	20/09/2008	Masters Athletics Clubs Championships
100 m	80	19.01 (−1.0 m/s)	Emma Mazzenga	01/08/1933	İzmir	24/08/2014	European Masters Athletics Championships
*	80	18.85 ( )	Emma Mazzenga	01/08/1933	Caprino Veronese	07/06/2014	Regional Masters Athletics Clubs Championships
100 m	85 pre	20.83 (−0.2 m/s)	Maria Cristina Fragiacomo	06/12/1938	Pescara	22/09/2023	European Masters Athletics Championships
100 m	85	21.97 (−0.7 m/s)	Maria Cristina Fragiacomo	06/12/1938	Gorizia	20/06/2026	Regional Masters Championships
100 m	90 pre	23.33 (−0.1 m/s)	Emma Mazzenga	01/08/1933	Monselice	03/06/2022	Regional Masters Athletics Championships
100 m	90	23.50 (−0.4 m/s)	Emma Mazzenga	01/08/1933	San Biagio di Callalta	04/05/2024	Regional Masters Athletics Clubs Championships
* Best results without wind detection or with winds above 2 m/s

=== 200 m F ===
Event	Age	Performance	Athlete	Birthdate	Venue	Date	Meet
200 m	35 pre	23.28 (+1.7 m/s)	Libania Grenot	12/07/1983	Clermont	28/04/2018	Pure Athletics Spring Invite
200 m	35	24.12 (+1.1 m/s)	Danielle Perpoli	07/03/1968	Majano	29/06/2003	Italian Athletics Clubs Championships
200 m	40	25.07 (−0.5 m/s)	Daniela Lai	15/01/1979	Cagliari	06/05/2023	Regional Athletics Meeting
200 m	45	25.12 (+0.7 m/s)	Serena Caravelli	18/12/1979	Misano Adriatico	22/06/2025	Italian Masters Athletics Championships
200 m	50	26.19 (+1.7 m/s)	Cristina Sanulli	21/11/1972	Misano Adriatico	22/06/2025	Italian Masters Athletics Championships
200 m	55	27.15 (+0.9 m/s)	Miriam Di Iorio	26/08/1966	Grosseto	12/06/2022	Italian Masters Athletics Championships
200 m	60 pre	28.49 (+1.4 m/s)	Miriam Di Iorio	26/08/1966	Pesaro	14/06/2026	Regional Masters Championships
200 m	60	29.25 (−2.0 m/s)	Monica Dessì	14/08/1962	Quartucciu	09/05/2026	Regional Masters Clubs Championships
200 m	65 pre	31.18 (+1.4 m/s)	Victoria Constantin	08/07/1960	Misano Adriatico	22/06/2025	Italian Masters Athletics Championships
200 m	65	31.28 (+0.6 m/s)	Maria Grazia Zuliani	17/12/1957	Brescia	21/06/2026	Regional Masters Championships
200 m	70 pre	31.78 (+2.0 m/s)	Anna Micheletti	27/06/1952	Rome	08/05/2022	Italian Masters Regional Clubs Championships
200 m	70	32.14 (−0.4 m/s)	Mariuccia Quilleri	02/06/1953	Rodengo Saiano	04/07/2023	Provincial Open Championships
200 m	75 pre	36.16 (+1.5 m/s)	Mara Ferrini	29/10/1950	Misano Adriatico	22/06/2025	Italian Masters Athletics Championships
200 m	75	36.25 (±0.0 m/s)	Emma Mazzenga	01/08/1933	Mestre	27/06/2010	Masters Athletics Clubs Championships Regional
200 m	80	39.12 (+0.3 m/s)	Emma Mazzenga	01/08/1933	İzmir	30/08/2014	European Masters Athletics Championships
200 m	85	44.47 (+0.5 m/s)	Emma Mazzenga	01/08/1933	Modena	30/09/2018	Masters Athletics Clubs Championships
200 m	90 pre	49.70 (+0.1 m/s)	Emma Mazzenga	01/08/1933	Salerno	16/07/2023	Masters Athletics Clubs Championships
200 m	90	50.33 (+0.2 m/s)	Emma Mazzenga	01/08/1933	Mestre	02/06/2024	Regional Masters Athletics Championships

=== 400 m F ===
Event	Age	Performance	Athlete	Birthdate	Venue	Date	Meet
400 m	35 pre	51.31	Libania Grenot	12/07/1983	Tarragona	28/06/2018	Mediterranean Games
400 m	35	51.54	Libania Grenot	12/07/1983	Berlin	09/08/2018	European Athletics Championships
400 m	40	57.54	Emanuela Baggiolini	10/06/1972	Porto Alegre	26/10/2013	World Masters Athletics Championships
400 m	45	58.29	Lucia Teresa Pollina	22/09/1975	Modena	08/05/2021	Memorial Ansaloni
400 m	50 pre	58.92	Lucia Teresa Pollina	22/09/1975	Misano Adriatico	21/06/2025	Italian Masters Athletics Championships
400 m	50 pre	58.3h	Lucia Teresa Pollina	22/09/1975	Palermo	12/07/2025	Regional Athletics Championships
400 m	50	1:00.50	Emanuela Baggiolini	10/06/1972	Olgiate Olona	25/06/2022	Provincial Open Championships
400 m	55	1:02.51	Barbara Martinelli	09/12/1965	Modena	05/06/2021	Festival BPER
400 m	60 pre	1:04.51	Barbara Martinelli	09/12/1965	Brescia	05/07/2025	Campionati Provinciali Masters
400 m	60	1:07.59	Monica Dessì	14/08/1962	Assemini	31/07/2026	Provincial track meet
400 m	65	1:11.03	Maria Grazia Zuliani	17/12/1957	Brescia	20/06/2026	Regional Masters Championships
400 m	70 pre	1:15.38	Anna Beatrice Micheletti	27/06/1952	Colleferro	04/06/2022	Regional Masters Athletics Championships
400 m	70	1:17.46	Anna Beatrice Micheletti	27/06/1952	Rome	22/06/2024	Italian Masters Athletics Championships
400 m	75 pre	1:23.20	Emma Mazzenga	01/08/1933	Ljubljana	30/07/2008	European Masters Athletics Championships
400 m	75	1:25.2	Emma Mazzenga	01/08/1933	Falconara	06/09/2008	Regional Masters Athletics Championships
400 m	80 pre	1:28.9	Emma Mazzenga	01/08/1933	Padua	01/05/2013	Memorial Pettinella
400 m	80	1:31.21	Emma Mazzenga	01/08/1933	Padua	01/09/2013	Meeting Città di Padova
400 m	85	1:47.91	Emma Mazzenga	01/08/1933	Arezzo	10/10/2020	Italian Masters Athletics Championships
400 m	90 pre	2:04.29	Emma Mazzenga	01/08/1933	Acireale	24/06/2023	Italian Masters Athletics Championships

=== 800 m F ===
Event	Age	Performance	Athlete	Birthdate	Venue	Date	Meet
800 m	35 pre	2:03.47	Yusneysi Santiusti	24/12/1984	Tomblaine	22/06/2019	Meeting Pro Athlé Tour
800 m	35	2:03.64	Elisabetta Artuso	25/04/1974	Lignano	12/07/2009	Meeting Sport Solidarietà
800 m	40	2:12.57	Martina Rosati	19/10/1983	La Spezia	25/04/2025	Trofeo Golfo dei Poeti
800 m	45	2:13.47	Lucia Teresa Pollina	22/09/1975	Modena	02/06/2021	Memorial Goldoni Benetti
800 m	50	2:17.78	Mara Cerini	25/05/1971	Saronno	24/04/2022	Regional Championships Multiple Events
800 m	55	2:27.39	Barbara Martinelli	09/12/1965	Saronno	08/05/2021	Meeting Gold Lombardia
800 m	60 pre	2:38.29	Emanuela Massa	17/12/1966	La Spezia	21/06/2026	Regional Masters Championships
800 m	60	2:39.58	Waltraud Egger	04/04/1950	Nyíregyháza	23/07/2010	European Masters Athletics Championships
800 m	65	2:55.95	Anna Patelli	27/04/1958	Colleferro	11/06/2023	Regional Masters Championships
800 m	70 pre	3:05.01	Paola D'Orazio	18/11/1953	Colleferro	11/06/2023	Regional Masters Championships
800 m	70	3:12.50	Paola D'Orazio	18/11/1953	Colleferro	16/06/2024	Regional Masters Championships
800 m	75 pre	3:22.20	Emma Mazzenga	01/08/1933	San Benedetto del Tronto	25/05/2008	14° Adriatic Gran Prix
800 m	75	3:25.18	Emma Mazzenga	01/08/1933	Formia	21/09/2008	Masters Athletics Clubs Championships
800 m	80 pre	4:00.55	Franca Maria Monasterolo	26/09/1943	Acireale	25/06/2023	Italian Masters Athletics Championships
800 m	80	4:18.23	Maria Cristina Fragiacomo	06/12/1938	Campi Bisenzio	07/07/2019	Italian Masters Athletics Championships
800 m	85 pre	4:47.23	Maria Cristina Fragiacomo	06/12/1938	Pordenone	18/05/2023	Provincial Masters Athletics Championships

=== 1500 m F ===
Event	Age	Performance	Athlete	Birthdate	Venue	Date	Meet
1500 m	35 pre	4:09.61	Gabriella Dorio	12/06/1957	Bassano del Grappa	09/06/1992	
1500 m	35	4:13.43	Eleonora Berlanda	06/04/1976	Lignano Sabbiadoro	17/07/2012	Meeting Sport Solidarietà
1500 m	40 pre	4:27.90	Valentina Tauceri	20/07/1966	Pordenone	20/05/2006	Italian Athletics Clubs Championships Regional
1500 m	40	4:30.25	Claudia Pinna	04/12/1977	Cagliari	22/05/2021	Regional Athletics Meet
1500 m	45 pre	4:35.97	Claudia Pinna	04/12/1977	Perugia	17/09/2022	Italian Clubs Championships Silver Final
1500 m	45	4:40.97	Claudia Pinna	04/12/1977	Foligno	14/06/2025	Italian Clubs Championships Silver Final
1500 m	50 pre	4:45.85	Mara Cerini	25/05/1971	Milan	24/04/2021	10^ Walk & Middle Distance Night
1500 m	50	4:48.20	Gloria Marconi	31/03/1968	Florence	07/07/2018	Regional Athletics Championships
1500 m	55 pre	4:59.64	Mara Cerini	25/05/1971	Cogliate	03/05/2026	Meeting Bronze Lombardia
1500 m	55	5:00.2	Carla Primo	15/05/1970	Vercelli	02/07/2025	Circuito Dodecarun 1500m
1500 m	60 pre	5:19:08	Emanuela Massa	17/12/1966	la Spezia	20/06/2026	Regional Masters Championships
1500 m	60	5:31.52	Elisabeth Moser	21/02/1961	Trento	06/07/2021	Gran Premio del Mezzofondo
1500 m	65 pre	5:37.90	Oriana Martignago	16/10/1959	Rome	22/06/2024	Italian Masters Athletics Championships
1500 m	65	5:48.23	Oriana Martignago	16/10/1959	Madeira	12/10/2025	European Masters Championships
1500 m	70 pre	6:17.60	Paola D'Orazio	18/11/1953	Salerno	15/07/2023	Masters Athletics Clubs Championships
1500 m	70	6:27.07	Paola D'Orazio	18/11/1953	Colleferro	24/05/2025	Regional Masters Athletics Clubs Championships
1500 m	75	6:36.16	Lucia Soranzo	13/12/1948	Madeira	12/10/2025	European Masters Championships
1500 m	80	8:16.42	Franca Maria Monasterolo	26/09/1943	Rome	22/06/2024	Italian Masters Athletics Championships
1500 m	85	9:33.60	Maria Cristina Fragiacomo	06/12/1938	Pordenone	05/06/2024	Provincial Masters Championships

=== 3000 m F ===
Event	Age	Performance	Athlete	Birthdate	Venue	Date	Meet
3000 m	35	8:52.60	Roberta Brunet	20/05/1965	Montecarlo	18/08/2000	Herculis
3000 m	40 pre	9:28.83	Nadia Dandolo	11/09/1962	Santa Maria di Sala	19/06/2002	
3000 m	40	9:38.47	Silvia Sommaggio	20/11/1969	Conegliano	14/07/2010	Meeting Fallai
3000 m	45 pre	9:58.88	Fiorenza Pierli	19/10/1980	Imola	02/07/2025	Memorial Franco Conti
3000 m	45	10:05.90	Nadia Dandolo	11/09/1962	Florence	20/09/2009	Masters Athletics Clubs Championships
3000 m	50	10:16.25	Gloria Marconi	31/03/1968	Sesto Fiorentino	22/05/2019	Memorial Vannini
3000 m	55	10:31.8	Carla Primo	15/05/1970	Rivarolo Canavese	13/09/2025	11a Prova Dodecarun
3000 m	60 pre	11:38.87	Elena Giovanna Fustella	18/08/1961	Trento	20/07/2021	Gran Premio del Mezzofondo 3a giornata
3000 m	60	11:49.10	Waltraud Egger	04/04/1950	Rovereto	19/06/2010	Masters Athletics Regional Clubs Championships
3000 m	65	12:37.38	Waltraud Egger	04/04/1950	Bastia Umbra	20/09/2015	Masters Athletics Clubs Championships
3000 m	70 pre	13:20.59	Paola D'Orazio	18/11/1953	Rome	25/04/2023	Trofeo della Liberazione
3000 m	70	13:41.00	Alessandra Camassa	24/04/1955	Molfetta	08/11/2025	Trofeo Puglia Master Track Final
3000 m	75	13:59.92	Lucia Soranzo	13/12/1948	Modena	12/05/2024	Regional Masters Athletics Clubs Championships
3000 m	80	18:26.84	Maria Pirastu	01/08/1943	Pavia	20/04/2024	Provincial Championships Open
3000 m	80	19:01.8	Maria Cristina Fragiacomo	06/12/1938	Pordenone	30/05/2019	Provincial Masters Athletics Championships

=== 5000 m F ===
Event	Age	Performance	Athlete	Birthdate	Venue	Date	Meet
5000 m	35	15:15.94	Roberta Brunet	20/05/1965	Viareggio	22/08/2000	Meeting Viareggio
5000 m	40	16:20.14	Claudia Pinna	04/12/1977	Pescara	08/09/2018	Italian Athletics Championships
5000 m	45 pre	16:51.65	Claudia Pinna	04/12/1977	Perugia	18/09/2022	Italian Clubs Championships Silver Final
5000 m	45	16:51.66	Emanuela Mazzei	20/10/1977	Milan	29/04/2023	12° Walk and Middle Distance Night
5000 m	50	17:38.28	Carla Primo	15/05/1970	Alba	03/09/2021	Memorial Florio
5000 m	55	18:01.9h	Carla Primo	15/05/1970	Alessandria	02/06/2025	1° Dodecarun - 5000
5000 m	60	19:55.21	Elena Giovanna Fustella	18/08/1961	Montesilvano	25/09/2023	European Masters Athletics Championships
5000 m	65 pre	20:07.12	Oriana Martignago	16/10/1959	Rome	21/06/2024	Italian Masters Athletics Championships
5000 m	65	21:04.96	Oriana Martignago	16/10/1959	Madeira	13/10/2025	European Masters Championships
5000 m	70	22:48.64	Alessandra Camassa	24/04/1955	Molfetta	11/05/2025	Regional Clubs Athletics Championships
5000 m	75	23:26.81	Lucia Soranzo	13/12/1948	Madeira	13/10/2025	European Masters Championships
5000 m	80 pre	30:31.57	Franca Monasterolo	26/09/1943	Acireale	23/06/2023	Italian Masters Athletics Championships
5000 m	80	33:25.77	Maria Cristina Fragiacomo	06/12/1938	Arezzo	09/10/2020	Italian Masters Athletics Championships
5000 m	85 pre	56:53.50	Maria Bellanova	19/12/1934	Turin	31/07/2019	European Masters Games

=== 10,000 m F ===
Event	Age	Performance	Athlete	Birthdate	Venue	Date	Meet
10,000 m	35 pre	31:45.14	Nadia Ejjafini	08/11/1977	Bilbao	03/06/2012	European Cup 10000m
10,000 m	35	32:15.87	Valeria Straneo	05/04/1976	Bilbao	03/06/2012	European Cup 10000m
10,000 m	40	32:55.25	Valeria Straneo	05/04/1976	Vittorio Veneto	27/09/2020	10000 mt National Athletics Championships
10,000 m	45	34:51.74	Emanuela Mazzei	20/10/1977	Brescia	07/05/2023	10000 mt National Athletics Championships
10,000 m	50	37:12.99	Carla Primo	15/05/1970	Vercelli	27/04/2024	10000 mt Italian Masters Athletics Championships
10,000 m	55	39:29.17	Lucia Soranzo	13/12/1948	Treviso	23/04/2005	10000 mt Regional Athletics Championships
10,000 m	60	41:11.32	Elena Giovanna Fustella	18/08/1961	Vercelli	27/04/2024	10000 mt Italian Masters Athletics Championships
10,000 m	65	43:26.0 h	Silvia Bolognesi	13/04/1954	Abbadia San Salvatore	25/05/2019	10000 mt Italian Masters Athletics Championships
10,000 m	70	45:13.55	Silvia Bolognesi	13/04/1954	Vercelli	27/04/2024	10000 mt Italian Masters Athletics Championships
10,000 m	75 pre	58:26.68	Maria Cristina Fragiacomo	06/12/1938	Gorizia	08/06/2013	10000 mt Italian Masters Athletics Championships
10,000 m	75	53:39.07	Gianna Annita Vaccari	03/03/1948	Vercelli	27/04/2024	10000 mt Italian Masters Athletics Championships
10,000 m	80	58:53.5 h	Maria Cristina Fragiacomo	06/12/1938	Abbadia San Salvatore	25/05/2019	10000 mt Italian Masters Athletics Championships

=== 10K run F ===
Event	Age	Performance	Athlete	Birthdate	Venue	Date	Meet
10K run	35 pre	31:52	Nadia Ejjafini	08/11/1977	Manchester	20/05/2012	Great Manchester Run
10K run	35	32:07	Valeria Straneo	05/04/1976	Lucca	11/09/2011	10 km road Italian Athletics Championships
10K run	40	32:31	Gloria Marconi	31/03/1968	Prato	20/05/2008	Trofeo Questura
10K run	40	33:09	Fatna Maraoui	10/07/1977	Dalmine	09/09/2017	10 km road Italian Masters Championships
10K run	45	34:02	Catherine Bertone	06/05/1972	Canelli	08/09/2019	10 km road Italian Championships
10K run	50	34:50	Carla Primo	15/05/1970	Nice	08/01/2023	10 km Prom'Classic
10K run	55 pre	36:29	Carla Primo	15/05/1970	Pietra Ligure	04/05/2025	La Rapidissima 10km
10K run	55	37.08	Carla Primo	15/05/1970	Tortona	08/03/2026	Derthona Ten
10K run	60	40:27	Elena Giovanna Fustella	18/08/1961	Toruń	29/03/2023	World Masters Athletics Indoor Championships
10K run	65	41:44	Oriana Martignago	16/10/1959	Milan	24/11/2024	Milano half marathon
10K run	70 pre	45:02	Cristina Frontespezi	30/12/1956	Catania	01/05/2026	European Masters Championships Non Stadia
10K run	70	45:03	Silvia Bolognesi	13/04/1954	Vado Ligure	06/10/2024	La Dieci di Vado e Quiliano
10K run	75	48:40	Lucia Soranzo	13/12/1948	Faenza	23/11/2025	10 km Citta' di Faenza
10K run	80 pre	59:02	Franca Maria Monasterolo	26/09/1943	Turin	16/04/2023	10 km Torino
10K run	80	59:05	Franca Maria Monasterolo	26/09/1943	Vinovo	01/10/2023	6° Hipporun Vinovo
10K run	85	1h34:25	Palmira Saracino	06/04/1941	Maglie	03/05/2026	Stracittadina Magliese
The records of the Km 10 road race was written for the first time in 2009, based on the results in the federal computer archive since 2003

=== Half marathon F ===
Event	Age	Performance	Athlete	Birthdate	Venue	Date	Meet
Half Marathon	35	1h07:47a	Valeria Straneo	05/04/1976	Ostia	26/02/2012	Roma-Ostia Half Marathon
Half Marathon	35	1h08:48	Valeria Straneo	05/04/1976	Milan	25/03/2012	Milano Half Marathon
Half Marathon	40	1h11:34	Valeria Straneo	05/04/1976	Verona	16/02/2020	Romeo and Juliet Half Marathon
Half Marathon	45	1h12:38	Catherine Bertone	06/05/1972	Aosta	27/10/2019	Aosta Half Marathon
Half Marathon	50	1h15:05+	Catherine Bertone	06/05/1972	Valencia	04/12/2022	Valencia Marathon
Half Marathon	50	1h17:01	Catherine Bertone	06/05/1972	Vinovo	02/10/2022	Hipporun Vinovo Half Marathon
Half Marathon	55 pre	1h19:59	Claudia Gelsomino	03/09/1969	Reggio Emilia	17/03/2023	Reggio Emilia Half Marathon
Half Marathon	55	1h23:00	Claudia Gelsomino	03/09/1969	San Benedetto del Tronto	13/04/2025	Italian Masters Half Marathon Championships
Half Marathon	60 pre	1h30:17	Rosalia Zanoner	03/12/1951	Cremona	16/10/2011	Italian Half Marathon Championships
Half Marathon	60	1h30:34	Silvia Bolognesi	13/04/1954	Lyon	16/08/2015	World Masters Athletics Championships
Half Marathon	65	1h29:22	Oriana Martignago	16/10/1959	Busto Arsizio	10/11/2024	Half Marathon Città Busto Arsizio
Half Marathon	70 pre	1h35:55a	Silvia Bolognesi	13/04/1954	Salsomaggiore Terme	25/02/2024	Verdi Half Marathon
Half Marathon	70	1h36:52	Silvia Bolognesi	13/04/1954	Genoa	14/04/2024	Italian Masters Half Marathon Championships
Half Marathon	75	1h58:42	Venere Sarra	08/06/1948	Barletta	04/02/2024	Barletta Half Marathon
Half Marathon	80	2h02:07	Franca Maria Monasterolo	26/09/1943	Turin	05/11/2023	Turin Marathon
Half Marathon	80	2h13:09	Franca Maria Monasterolo	26/09/1943	Genoa	14/04/2024	Italian Masters Half Marathon Championships

=== Marathon F ===
Event	Age	Performance	Athlete	Birthdate	Venue	Date	Meet
Marathon	35	2h23:44	Valeria Straneo	05/04/1976	Rotterdam	15/04/2012	Rotterdam Marathon
Marathon	40	2h29:44	Valeria Straneo	05/04/1976	Rio de Janeiro	14/08/2016	Olympic Games
Marathon	45	2h28:34	Catherine Bertone	06/05/1972	Berlin	24/09/2017	Berlin Marathon
Marathon	50	2h34:14	Catherine Bertone	06/05/1972	Valencia	04/12/2022	Valencia Marathon
Marathon	50	2h35:35	Catherine Bertone	06/05/1972	Frankfurt	29/10/2023	Frankfurt Marathon
Marathon	55	3h02:22	Maria Grazia Navacchia	05/11/1952	Vercelli	01/05/2008	Maratona del Riso
Marathon	55	3h03:12	Maria Grazia Navacchia	05/11/1952	Syracuse	15/02/2009	Siracusa City Marathon
Marathon	60	3h15:20	Nadia Dal Ben	26/09/1950	Turin	14/11/2010	Turin Marathon
Marathon	60	3h17:19	Nadia Dal Ben	26/09/1950	Turin	13/11/2011	Turin Marathon
Marathon	65	3h30:19	Rita Gabellini	29/03/1956	Russi	06/04/2025	Maratona del Lamone
Marathon	70	3h50:23	Maria Teresa Andreos	16/08/1953	Verona	19/11/2023	Verona Marathon
Marathon	75 pre	4h21:05	Giovanna Mondini	28/07/1947	Padua	24/04/2022	Maratona di Sant'Antonio
Marathon	75	4h27:11 4h22:58c	Venere Sarra	08/06/1948	Florence	24/11/2024	Florence Marathon
Marathon	80	4h56:49 4h56:17c	Franca Maria Monasterolo	26/09/1943	Turin	01/12/2024	Turin Marathon
Marathon	80	4h59:15 4h52:55c	Franca Maria Monasterolo	26/09/1943	Florence	26/11/2023	Florence Marathon

=== 50K run F ===
Event	Age	Performance	Athlete	Birthdate	Venue	Date
50K run	35	3h26:31	Sarah Giomi	22/01/1985	Castelbolognese	25/04/2024
50K run	40	3h25:16	Silvia Luna	18/08/1978	Recanati	25/02/2023
50K run	45 pre	3h25:16	Silvia Luna	18/08/1978	Recanati	25/02/2023
50K run	45	3h27:26	Federica Moroni	06/03/1972	Recanati	19/02/2022
50K run	50	3h24:00	Federica Moroni	06/03/1972	Recanati	21/02/2026
50K run	55 pre	3h53:01	Giovanna Ugania	02/07/1971	Recanati	21/02/2026
50K run	55	4h01:47	Rita Gabellini	29/03/1956	Castelbolognese	25/04/2015
50K run	60	4h27:16	Nicoletta Rossetti	26/07/1960	Castelbolognese	25/04/2023
50K run	65	4h29:18	Rita Gabellini	29/03/1956	Castelbolognese	25/04/2023
50K run	70	5h55:23	Annamaria Galbani	23/01/1952	Castelbolognese	25/04/2023
50K run	75	8h25:27	Fiorenza Simion	16/02/1943	Pistoia	24/06/2018
50K run	80	9h00:07	Fiorenza Simion	16/02/1943	Pistoia	30/06/2024
The redords of this specialty have been drawn up for the first time in 2012 on the basis of results in the FIDAL archive starting in 2008. Any other better performance than the ones included should be reported to the statistical office

=== 100K run F ===
Event	Age	Performance	Athlete	Birthdate	Venue	Date	Meet
100K run	35	7h29:01	Monica Carlin	20/06/1971	Seoul	08/10/2006	AU 100 km World Championships
100K run	40	7h29:01	Silvia Luna	18/08/1978	Berlin	27/08/2022	AU 100 km World Championships
100K run	45	7h31:45	Federica Moroni	06/09/1972	Berlin	27/08/2022	AU 100 km World Championships
100K run	50	7h27:50	Federica Moroni	06/09/1972	Porto Recanati	17/02/2024	100 km del Conero
100K run	55 pre	9h34.24	Barbara Cimarrusti	18/12/1971	Faenza	23/05/2026	100 km del Passatore
100K run	55	10h39:41	Agnese Casu	21/01/1966	Recanati	19/02/2022	100 km del Conero
100K run	60	11h10:44	Giovanna Ferrarini	17/07/1957	Faenza	21/05/2022	100 km del Passatore
100K run	65 pre	11h10:44	Giovanna Ferrarini	17/07/1957	Faenza	21/05/2022	100 km del Passatore
100K run	65	11h55:57	Mirella Bordi	07/05/1946	Faenza	29/05/2011	100 km del Passatore
100K run	70	13h37:47	Franca Monasterolo	26/09/1943	Turin	08/10/2016	100 km delle Alpi
100K run	75 pre	17h39:57	Marina Mocellin	13/07/1951	Faenza	23/05/2026	100 km del Passatore
100K run	75	19h10:08	Fiorenza Simion	16/02/1943	Faenza	25/05/2018	100 km del Passatore
100K run	80	18h53:26	Anna Guarnieri Ortolani	07/02/1916	Faenza	28/05/1999	100 km del Passatore

=== 24H run F ===
Event	Age	Performance	Athlete	Birthdate	Venue	Date
24H run	35	226.130	Monica Casiraghi	04/04/1969	Ciserano	19/04/2008
24H run	40	231.390	Monica Casiraghi	04/04/1969	Brive	13/05/2010
24H run	45	219.260	Luisa Zecchino	11/12/1967	Steenbergen	11/05/2013
24H run	50 pre	224.263	Francesca Canepa	14/09/1971	Biella	27/03/2021
24H run	50	193.306	Sonia Lutterotti	20/03/1961	Turin	13/04/2014
24H run	55	184.441	Sonia Lutterotti	20/03/1961	Reggio Emilia	13/03/2016
24H run	60	161.444	Tiziana Fasolo	08/10/1959	Venice	15/04/2023
24H run	65	155.535	Tiziana Fasolo	08/10/1959	Venice	13/04/2025
24H run	70	153.950	Daniela Lazzaro	14/11/1953	Venice	13/04/2024
24H run	75	117.281	Venerina Magda Callegari	17/11/1939	Turin	11/04/2015
24H run	80	103.655	Fiorenza Simion	15/02/1943	Venice	15/04/2023

=== 2000 m steeplechase F ===
Event	Age	Performance	Athlete	Birthdate	Venue	Date	Meet
2000 m steeplechase	35 pre	6:57.78	Veronica Chiusole	26/07/1972	Rovereto	12/07/2007	
2000 m steeplechase	35	7:01.19	Veronica Chiusole	26/07/1972	Riccione	15/09/2007	World Masters Athletics Championships
2000 m steeplechase	40	7:02.96	Samia Soltane	25/02/1967	Bressanone	21/06/2008	Italian Masters Athletics Championships
2000 m steeplechase	45	7:42.71	Loretta Rubini	11/07/1960	San Sebastián	03/09/2005	World Masters Athletics Championships
2000 m steeplechase	50	7:58.00	Debora Ferro	03/12/1973	Volpiano	06/06/2026	Regional Masters Athletics Championships
2000 m steeplechase	55 pre	8:32.51	Patrizia Passerini	18/10/1962	Orvieto	09/07/2017	Italian Masters Athletics Championships
2000 m steeplechase	55	8:36.29	Patrizia Passerini	18/10/1962	Campi Bisenzio	07/07/2019	Italian Masters Athletics Championships
2000 m steeplechase	60 pre	10:21.88	Paola Carinato	28/11/1964	Rome	23/06/2024	Italian Masters Athletics Championships
2000 m steeplechase	60	10:23.91	Victoria Hazota	05/01/1965	Campi Bisenzio	20/09/2026	Italian Masters Athletics Championships
2000 m steeplechase	65 pre	12:06.23	Marinella Satta	15/09/1957	Grosseto	12/06/2022	Italian Masters Athletics Championships
2000 m steeplechase	65	12:35.42	Marinella Satta	15/09/1957	Giaveno	31/05/2025	Regional Masters Clubs Championships

=== 3000 m steeplechase F ===
Event	Age	Performance	Athlete	Birthdate	Venue	Date	Meet
3000 m steeplechase	35	10:49.52	Sonia Maria Conceicao Lopes	06/04/1975	Caprino Veronese	09/06/2012	Regional Italian Athletics Clubs Championships
3000 m steeplechase	40	10:44.50	Samia Soltane	25/02/1967	Alessandria	17/05/2008	Regional Italian Athletics Clubs Championships
3000 m steeplechase	50	12:26:98	Debora Ferro	03/12/1973	Mondovì	11/05/2024	Regional Italian Athletics Clubs Championships
3000 m steeplechase	55	13:08.42	Patrizia Passerini	18/10/1962	Forlì	26/05/2018	Regional Italian Athletics Clubs Championships

=== Short hurdles F ===
Event	Age	Performance	Athlete	Birthdate	Venue	Date	Meet
100 hs(084)x8.50	35	13.20 (+1.8 m/s)	Micol Cattaneo	14/05/1982	Trieste	01/07/2017	Italian Athletics Championships
80 hs (076)x 8m	40	11.47 (+1.3 m/s)	Serena Caravelli	18/12/1979	Pescara	29/09/2023	European Masters Championships
80 hs (076)x 8m	45	11.51 (+1.3 m/s)	Serena Caravelli	18/12/1979	Madeira	10/10/2025	European Masters Championships
80 hs (076)x 7m	50	12.85 (−0.4 m/s)	Roberta Sara Colombo	19/08/1973	Rome	21/06/2024	Italian Masters Championships
80 hs (076)x 7m	55	13.29 (+0.7 m/s)	Maria Costanza Moroni	23/03/1969	Asti	24/06/2026	Memorial Daniele Giacosa
80 hs (068)x 7m	60	13.62 (−0.6 m/s)	Antonella Sant	31/08/1961	San Biagio di Callalta	31/05/2026	Regional Masters Clubs Championships
80 hs (068)x 7m	65 pre	13.62 (−0.6 m/s)	Antonella Sant	31/08/1961	San Biagio di Callalta	31/05/2026	Regional Masters Clubs Championships
80 hs (068)x 7m	65	14.33 (−1.2 m/s)	Antonella Sant	31/08/1961	Campi Bisenzio	18/09/2026	Italian Masters Championships
80 hs (068)x 7m	70	17.17 (+1.0 m/s)	Ingeborg Zorzi	25/03/1948	Arezzo	02/06/2018	Italian Multiple Masters Athletics Championships
80 hs (068)x 7m	75	20.53 (−2.5 m/s)	Ingeborg Zorzi	25/03/1948	Madeira	11/10/2025	European Masters Championships
80 hs (068)x 7m		21.34 (−0.9 m/s)	Ingeborg Zorzi	25/03/1948	Pescara	23/09/2023	European Masters Championships

=== 200 m hs F ===
Event	Age	Performance	Athlete	Birthdate	Venue	Date	Meet
200 hs (76x18.30)	35	28.63 (−0.6 m/s)	Erika Niedermayr	30/08/1961	Brescia	08/09/1996	Memorial Paterlini Calvesi
200 hs (76x18.30)		29.62 (−1.5 m/s)	Serena Caravelli	18/12/1979	Rome	14/06/2015	Regional Masters Clubs Championships
200 hs (76x18.30)	40	29.65 (−0.5 m/s)	Emanuela Baggiolini	10/06/1972	Milan	04/10/2015	Memorial Zancan
200 hs (76x18.30)	45	29.14 (+0.5 m/s)	Serena Caravelli	18/12/1979	Gorizia	15/06/2025	Regional Masters Clubs Championships
200 hs (76x18.30)	50	30.85 (−0.4 m/s)	Roberta Sara Colombo	19/08/1973	San Biagio di Callalta	14/07/2024	National Masters Clubs Championships
200 hs (76x18.30)	55	33.79 (+0.6 m/s)	Erika Niedermayr	30/08/1961	Gavardo	03/09/2016	1° Meeting for European Master Athletic Teams
200 hs (76x18.30)	60	36.53 (−0.6 m/s)	Erika Niedermayr	30/08/1961	Bolzano	08/05/2022	Regional Masters Clubs Championships

=== Long hurdles F ===
Event	Age	Performance	Athlete	Birthdate	Venue	Date	Meet
400 hs (076)	35 pre	55.69	Marzia Caravelli	23/10/1981	Orvieto	26/05/2016	Memorial Luca Coscioni
400 hs (076)	35	55.83	Manuela Gentili	07/02/1978	Milan	28/07/2013	Italian Athletics Championships
400 hs (076)	35	55.83	Marzia Caravelli	23/10/1981	Rome	08/06/2017	Golden Gala
400 hs (076)	40	1:00.86	Emanuela Baggiolini	10/06/1972	Rieti	29/09/2013	Italian Athletics Clubs Championships
400 hs (076)	45	1:02.93	Emanuela Baggiolini	10/06/1972	Cagliari	25/06/2017	Regional Athletics Championships
400 hs (076)	50	1:04.76	Emanuela Baggiolini	10/06/1972	Brescia	17/07/2022	Memorial Avigo
300 hs (076)	50	46.06	Emanuela Baggiolini	10/06/1972	Grosseto	10/06/2022	Italian Masters Athletics Championships
300 hs (076)	55	47.17	Maria Costanza Moroni	23/03/1969	Vercelli	20/09/2025	Campionati piemontesi/valdostani giovanili open
300 hs (069)	60	56.27	Erika Niedermayr	30/08/1961	Acireale	23/06/2023	Italian Masters Athletics Championships
300 hs (069)	65 pre	1:09.00	Anna Maria Caminiti	14/06/1960	Giaveno	31/05/2025	Regional Masters Athletics Championships
300 hs (069)	65	1:09.89	Fioretta Nadali	12/01/1960	Misano Adriatico	20/06/2025	Italian Masters Athletics Championships

=== High jump F ===
Event	Age	Performance	Athlete	Birthdate	Venue	Date	Meet
High jump	35	1.86	Roberta Bugarini	19/09/1969	Imola	17/05/2008	Italian Athletics Clubs Championships Regional
High jump	40 pre	1.78	Roberta Bugarini	19/09/1969	Modena	16/05/2009	Italian Athletics Clubs Championships Regional
High jump	40	1.76	Roberta Bugarini	19/09/1969	Florence	04/06/2011	Italy Cup
High jump	45	1.62 i	Maria Costanza Moroni	23/03/1969	Padua	23/01/2016	Italian Multiple Events Athletics Championships indoor
High jump	45	1.61	Maria Costanza Moroni	23/03/1969	Santhia	18/10/2014	Gran Prix Multiple Events
High jump	50 pre	1.57 i	Irene Pregazzi	14/10/1974	Ancona	23/02/2024	Italian Masters Athletics Championships indoor
High jump	50	1.55	Chiara Ansaldi	30/04/1968	Sanremo	26/07/2020	TAC Sanremo
High jump	50	1.55 i	Chiara Ansaldi	30/04/1968	Casalmaggiore	28/02/2021	National Masters indoor Meeting
High jump	55	1.51	Monica Buizza	30/04/1966	Salerno	16/07/2023	Masters Athletics Clubs Championships
High jump	60	1.47	Monica Buizza	30/04/1966	Campi Bisenzio	20/09/2026	Italian Masters Athletics Championships
High jump	60	1.46	Monica Buizza	30/04/1966	Daegu	30/08/2026	World Masters Athletics Championships
High jump	65	1.28	Carmela Micieli	01/05/1957	Grosseto	10/06/2022	Italian Masters Athletics Championships
High jump	65	1.28i	Carmela Micieli	01/05/1957	Ancona	11/03/2023	Italian Masters Athletics Championships indoor
High jump	65	1.28i	Sandra Dini	01/01/1958	Ancona	11/03/2023	Italian Masters Athletics Championships indoor
High jump	70	1.18	Ingeborg Zorzi	25/03/1948	Málaga	10/09/2018	World Masters Athletics Championships
High jump	75 pre	1.13 i	Ingeborg Zorzi	25/03/1948	Ancona	11/03/2023	Italian Masters Athletics Championships indoor
High jump	75	1.10	Ingeborg Zorzi	25/03/1948	Pescara	28/09/2023	European Masters Championships
High jump	80	1.00	Giulia Perugini	04/11/1936	Montecassiano	11/06/2017	Masters Athletics Regional Clubs Championships
High jump	85	0.90 i	Giulia Perugini	04/11/1936	Ancona	11/02/2022	Italian Masters Athletics Championships indoor

=== Pole vault F ===
Event	Age	Performance	Athlete	Birthdate	Venue	Date	Meet
Pole vault	35	4.05 i	Giorgia Vian	18/06/1984	Padua	05/03/2023	Regional indoor Masters Championships
Pole vault	35	4.01	Giorgia Vian	18/06/1984	Novellara	02/07/2023	Memorial Bolondi
Pole vault	40	3.95 i	Giorgia Vian	18/06/1984	Canegrate	22/12/2024	indoor Pole vault circuit
Pole vault	40	3.85	Giorgia Vian	18/06/1984	Rome	21/06/2024	Italian Masters Athletics Championships
Pole vault	45 pre	3.60 i	Carla Forcellini	07/11/1959	Sindelfingen	12/03/2004	World Masters Athletics Championships indoor
Pole vault	45	3.50	Carla Forcellini	07/11/1959	Vigna di Valle	15/05/2005	Italian Athletics Clubs Championships Regional
Pole vault	50 pre	3.40	Carla Forcellini	07/11/1959	Rieti	07/06/2009	Regional Meeting
Pole vault	50	3.30	Carla Forcellini	07/11/1959	Nyíregyháza	21/07/2010	European Masters Athletics Championships
Pole vault	55	3.00	Carla Forcellini	07/11/1959	Orvieto	07/07/2017	Italian Masters Athletics Championships
Pole vault	55	3.00	Carla Forcellini	07/11/1959	Orvieto	21/07/2017	Notturna di Orvieto
Pole vault	60 pre	2.90	Carla Forcellini	07/11/1959	Rieti	02/06/2019	Italian Athletics Clubs Championships Regional
Pole vault	60	2.87	Carla Forcellini	07/11/1959	Arezzo	09/10/2020	Italian Athletics Masters Championships

=== Long jump F ===
Event	Age	Performance	Athlete	Birthdate	Venue	Date	Meet
Long jump	35 pre	6.69 i	Fiona May	12/12/1969	Athens	22/02/2004	Meeting indoor 'Athina 2004'
Long jump	35	6.64 (+0.5 m/s)	Fiona May	12/12/1969	Almería	30/06/2005	Mediterranean Games
Long jump	40	5.54 (+0.3 m/s)	Roberta Sara Colombo	19/08/1973	Milan	18/06/2016	Masters Athletics Regional Clubs Championships
Long jump	45	5.61 (+1.3 m/s)	Maria Costanza Moroni	23/03/1969	Lyon	11/08/2015	World Masters Athletics Championships
Long jump	50	5.48 (+0.5 m/s)	Maria Costanza Moroni	23/03/1969	Mondovì	04/09/2021	Trofeo delle Regioni Masters
Long jump	55	4.96 (+0.1 m/s)	Maria Costanza Moroni	23/03/1969	Biella	06/09/2025	20° Gomitolo di Lana
Long jump	60 pre	4.51 (+0.2 m/s)	Federica Gaido	15/11/1966	Montespertoli	21/06/2026	Regional Masters Championships
Long jump	60	4.34 (+1.5 m/s)	Antonella Sant	31/08/1961	Catania	20/09/2025	Italian Masters Clubs Championships
Long jump	65 pre	4.27 (+0.5 m/s)	Antonella Sant	31/08/1961	Rome	11/07/2026	Italian Masters Clubs Championships
Long jump	65	4.25 (−0.4 m/s)	Antonella Sant	31/08/1961	Campi Bisenzio	19/09/2026	Italian Masters Athletics Championships
Long jump	70	3.77 (+1.0 m/s)	Luisella Rossi	20/01/1956	Pistoia	30/05/2026	Regional Masters Clubs Championships
Long jump	75 pre	3.28 (+0.5 m/s)	Maria Grazia Rafti	10/12/1951	Colleferro	30/05/2026	Regional Masters Clubs Championships
Long jump	75	2.94 i	Ingeborg Zorzi	25/03/1948	Ancona	22/02/2024	Italian Masters Athletics Championships indoor
Long jump	75	2.84 (+0.4 m/s)	Elvia Di Giulio	22/04/1947	Colleferro	04/06/2022	Regional Masters Athletics Championships
Long jump	75	2.84 (+1.0 m/s)	Ingeborg Zorzi	25/03/1948	Madeira	13/10/2025	European Masters Championships
Long jump	80	2.59 (±0.0 m/s)	Maria Lategana	04/01/1941	Brindisi	26/06/2021	Stadion 192 - 4^ prova
Long jump	85	1.34 (−2.2 m/s)	Maria Luigia Belletti	25/08/1934	Beinasco	13/05/2023	Regional Masters Clubs Championships

=== Triple jump F ===
Event	Age	Performance	Athlete	Birthdate	Venue	Date	Meet
Triple jump	35	14.00 (+1.9 m/s)	Antonella Capriotti	04/02/1962	Milan	02/06/1997	Italian Athletics Championships
Triple jump	40	13.51 (+0.8 m/s)	Barbara Lah	24/03/1972	Chiari	23/06/2012	Regional Athletics Championships
Triple jump	45	12.30 (+0.1 m/s)	Barbara Lah	24/03/1972	San Biagio di Callalta	11/05/2019	Italian Regional Clubs Athletics Championships
Triple jump	50	11.37 (+1.2 m/s)	Maria Costanza Moroni	23/03/1969	Donnas	23/05/2021	Regional Athletics Championships
Triple jump	55	10.18 (+1.1 m/s)	Chiara Ansaldi	30/04/1968	Chivasso	01/07/2023	Regional Meeting
Triple jump	60	9.19 (+0.9 m/s)	Antonella Sant	31/08/1961	Brugnera	26/05/2024	Regional Masters Clubs Championships
Triple jump	60	9.48i	Susanna Tellini	24/03/1966	Toruń	29/03/2026	European Masters Athletics Championships indoor
Triple jump	65 pre	9.11 (−0.3 m/s)	Antonella Sant	31/08/1961	Rome	12/07/2026	Italian Masters Clubs Championships
Triple jump	65	9.04 (+0.4 m/s)	Antonella Sant	31/08/1961	Campi Bisenzio	20/09/2026	Italian Masters Athletics Championships
Triple jump	70	8.25 (−1.1 m/s)	Maria Grazia Rafti	10/12/1951	Colleferro	04/06/2022	Regional Masters Athletics Championships
Triple jump	75 pre	7.52 i	Maria Grazia Rafti	10/12/1951	Ancona	06/03/2026	Italian Masters Athletics Indoor Championships
Triple jump	75 pre	7.48 (−1.5 m/s)	Maria Grazia Rafti	10/12/1951	Rome	12/07/2026	Italian Masters Clubs Championships
Triple jump	75	5.70 i	Elvia Di Giulio	22/04/1947	Ancona	11/03/2023	Italian Masters Athletics Indoor Championships
Triple jump	75	5.30 (+1.3 m/s)	Maria Lategana	04/01/1941	Lecce	12/05/2018	Regional Masters Athletics Championships
Triple jump	80	4.50 (+0.0 m/s)	Maria Lategana	04/01/1941	Lecce	05/06/2021	Pista al Corripuglia
Triple jump	85	3.26 (+0.1 m/s)	Maria Luigia Belletti	25/08/1934	Ariano Irpino	29/09/2019	Italian Masters Athletics Clubs Championships
* Best results without wind detection or with winds above 2 m/s

=== Shot put F ===
Event	Age	Performance	Athlete	Birthdate	Venue	Date	Meet
Shot put (4)	35	18.89 i	Mara Rosolen	27/07/1965	Castellanza	16/02/1997	Italian Athletics Championships indoor U23 Open
Shot put (4)	35	18.81	Mara Rosolen	27/07/1965	Avezzano	20/08/2000	8° Meeting di Avezzano
Shot put (4)	40	17.08	Assunta Legnante	12/05/1978	Ascoli Piceno	28/07/2018	Memorial Jannetti
Shot put (4)	45	15.67	Assunta Legnante	12/05/1978	Padua	27/05/2023	Italian Paralympics Athletics Championships
Shot put (3)	50	12.46	Pasqualina Proietti Pannunzi	18/05/1971	Pescara	06/06/2021	Meeting Giovanile Città di Pescara
Shot put (3)	55	12.02i	Valentina Montemaggiori	14/09/1969	Ancona	06/03/2026	Italian Masters Indoor Athletics Championships
Shot put (3)	55	11.70	Valentina Montemaggiori	14/09/1969	Rome	11/07/2026	Italian Masters Clubs Championships
Shot put (3)	60	10.56	Waltraud Mattedi	26/11/1960	Steyr	15/07/2023	Austria Masters Athletics Championships
Shot put (3)	65	9.50	Angela Fratini	13/10/1958	Modena	12/05/2024	Regional Masters Athletics Clubs Championships
Shot put (3)	70 pre	8.90	Maria Luisa Finazzi	24/10/1944	Santhia	17/05/2014	Regional Masters Athletics Championships
Shot put (3)	70	8.88	Renate Schaefer	24/05/1956	Bolzano	05/09/2026	Trofeo delle Regioni Masters
Shot put (2)	75 pre	9.40 i	Maria Luisa Finazzi	24/10/1944	Ancona	22/02/2019	Italian Masters Indoor Athletics Championships
Shot put (2)	75 pre	9.18	Maria Luisa Finazzi	24/10/1944	Asti	08/06/2019	Masters Athletics Regional Clubs Championships
Shot put (2)	75	9.18	Maria Luisa Fancello	15/02/1943	Caorle	14/09/2019	European Masters Athletics Championships
Shot put (2)	80 pre	8.39	Maria Luisa Finazzi	24/10/1944	Novara	14/01/2024	Regional Masters Winter Throws
Shot put (2)	80	8.05	Maria Luisa Finazzi	24/10/1944	Misano Adriatico	21/06/2025	Italian Masters Athletics Championships
Shot put (2)	85	6.22	Nives Fozzer	14/01/1930	Gorizia	20/06/2015	Masters Clubs Championships Regional
Shot put (2)	90	5.36	Nives Fozzer	14/01/1930	Rome	27/03/2021	Italian Masters Winter Throws Pentathlon Championships
Shot put (2)	95	5.32	Gabre Gabric	14/10/1914	Nyiregyhaza	17/07/2010	European Masters Athletics Championships

=== Discus throw F ===
Event	Age	Performance	Athlete	Birthdate	Venue	Date	Meet
Discus throw (1)	35	62.94	Agnese Maffeis	09/03/1965	Lucca	15/06/2003	Gran Prix Banca Monte dei Paschi di Siena
Discus throw (1)	40	51.48	Maria Marello	11/03/1961	Chivasso	25/06/2002	Athletics Regional Championships
Discus throw (1)	45	45.18	Mara Rosolen	27/07/1965	Tarvisio	08/08/2010	Meeting 'Atletica senza confini'
Discus throw (1)	50	40.60	Pasqualina Proietti Pannunzi	18/05/1971	Pescara	23/05/2021	Regional Athletics Championships
Discus throw (1)	55	36.16	Pasqualina Proietti Pannunzi	18/05/1971	Ascoli Piceno	25/07/2026	33° Ascoli Meeting
Discus throw (1)	60	32.78	Waltraud Mattedi	26/11/1960	Bolzano	22/05/2021	Regional Throws Championships
Discus throw (1)	65	30.64	Waltraud Mattedi	26/11/1960	Rome	12/07/2026	Italian Masters Clubs Championships
Discus throw (1)	70	27.18	Maria Luisa Fancello	15/02/1943	Siena	07/07/2013	Regional Masters Athletics Championships
Discus throw (0,75)	75	25.87	Maria Luisa Fancello	15/02/1943	Caorle	14/09/2019	European Masters Athletics Championships
Discus throw (0,75)	80	19.96	Rosanna Franchi	29/03/1942	Busto Arsizio	28/05/2022	Regional Masters Athletics Championships
Discus throw (0,75)	85	12.30	Anna Flaibani	19/08/1928	İzmir	29/08/2014	European Masters Athletics Championships
Discus throw (0,75)	90	12.79	Gabre Gabric	14/10/1914	Saint Christophe	06/09/2009	Regional Masters Athletics Championships
Discus throw (0,75)	90	11.86	Gabre Gabric	14/10/1914	Ljubljana	31/07/2008	European Masters Athletics Championships
Discus throw (0,75)	95	12.86	Gabre Gabric	14/10/1914	Nyiregyhaza	16/07/2010	European Masters Athletics Championships

=== Hammer throw F ===
Event	Age	Performance	Athlete	Birthdate	Venue	Date	Meet
Hammer throw (4)	35	53.96	Maria Tranchina	10/02/1968	Palermo	02/06/2004	Meeting Team Europe
Hammer throw (4)	40	49.31	Maria Tranchina	10/02/1968	Palermo	12/07/2008	Meeting Sicily World Athletic
Hammer throw (4)	45	43.19	Maria Tranchina	10/02/1968	Palermo	06/07/2013	Italian Athletics Clubs Championships Regional
Hammer throw (4)	50	44.47	Patrizia Aletta	10/02/1971	Palermo	17/09/2022	Italian Clubs Championships Bronze Final
Hammer throw (3)	50	48.99	Patrizia Aletta	10/02/1971	Salerno	03/06/2023	Regional Masters Athletics Championships
Hammer throw (3)	55	46.33	Marzia Zanoboni	03/04/1963	Modena	09/06/2018	Regional Masters Athletics Championships
Hammer throw (3)	60	44.07	Marzia Zanoboni	03/04/1963	Pescara	23/09/2023	European Masters Championships
Hammer throw (3)	65 pre	36.51	Anna Maria Camoletto	29/10/1955	Turin	22/02/2020	Regional Masters Athletics Throws Championships
Hammer throw (3)	65	35.54	Brunella Del Giudice	08/02/1943	Cattolica	19/06/2009	Italian Masters Athletics Championships
Hammer throw (3)	70	33.69	Maria Luisa Fancello	15/02/1943	Modena	04/07/2014	Italian Masters Athletics Championships
Hammer throw (2)	75	35.57	Maria Luisa Fancello	15/02/1943	Catania	14/04/2018	Italian Masters Spring Throws Pentathlon Championships
Hammer throw (2)	80	29.89	Maria Luisa Fancello	15/02/1943	Pescara	26/09/2023	European Masters Championships
Hammer throw (2)	85	21.69	Anna Flaibani	19/08/1928	İzmir	25/08/2014	European Masters Athletics Championships
Hammer throw (2)	90	14.95	Nives Fozzer	14/01/1930	Rieti	09/09/2021	Italian Masters Athletics Championships
Hammer throw (2)	95	8.79	Gabre Gabric	14/10/1914	Santhia	02/07/2011	Regional Masters Throws Pentathlon Championships

=== Javelin throw F ===
Event	Age	Performance	Athlete	Birthdate	Venue	Date	Meet
Javelin throw (600)	35	60.19	Claudia Coslovich	26/04/1972	Gorizia	22/06/2008	Regional Athletics Championships
Javelin throw (600)	40 pre	59.01	Zahra Bani	31/12/1979	Savona	29/05/2019	Meeting Città di Savona
Javelin throw (600)	40	57.15	Zahra Bani	31/12/1979	Split	09/05/2021	European Throwing Cup
Javelin throw (600)	45 pre	45.07	Veronica Becuzzi	08/12/1971	Arezzo	10/07/2016	Italian Masters Athletics Championships
Javelin throw (600)	45	44.18	Veronica Becuzzi	08/12/1971	Pontedera	21/05/2017	Italian Athletics Clubs Championships Regional
Javelin throw (600)	50	41.71	Veronica Becuzzi	08/12/1971	Perugia	18/09/2022	Italian Clubs Championships Silver final
Javelin throw (500)	50	41.36	Veronica Becuzzi	08/12/1971	Florence	08/05/2022	Regional Masters Clubs Championships
Javelin throw (500)	55 pre	39.36	Veronica Becuzzi	08/12/1971	Castelfranco Emilia	09/05/2026	Regional Masters Clubs Championships
Javelin throw (500)	55	36.69	Giuliana Amici	24/02/1952	San Giovanni in Marignano	07/09/2007	World Masters Athletics Championships
Javelin throw (500)	60	32.67	Waltraud Mattedi	26/11/1960	Acireale	24/06/2023	Italian Masters Athletics Championships
Javelin throw (500)	65	32.21	Giuliana Amici	24/02/1952	Caorle	12/09/2019	European Masters Athletics Championships
Javelin throw (500)	70	20.20	Anna Maria Giovanelli	21/12/1953	Rome	22/06/2024	Italian Masters Athletics Championships
Javelin throw (400)	75	18.92	Ingeborg Zorzi	25/03/1948	Pescara	21/09/2023	European Masters Athletics Championships
Javelin throw (400)	80 pre	17.32 old	Angela Cressi	03/09/1914	Athens	07/06/1994	European Masters Athletics Championships
Javelin throw (400)	80	16.12 old	Angela Cressi	03/09/1914	Malmö	24/07/1996	European Masters Athletics Championships
Javelin throw (400)	85	10.20	Ottavina Pellegrini	15/11/1921	Pistoia	16/06/2007	Regional Masters Athletics Championships
Javelin throw (400)	90 pre	9.66	Ottavina Pellegrini	15/11/1921	Pistoia	11/06/2011	Regional Masters Athletics Championships
Javelin throw (400)	90	8.74	Gabre Gabric	14/10/1914	Milan	29/06/2007	Italian Masters Athletics Championships
Javelin throw (400)	95	7.92	Gabre Gabric	14/10/1914	Nyiregyhaza	16/07/2010	European Masters Athletics Championships

=== Weight Throw F ===
Event	Age	Performance	Athlete	Birthdate	Venue	Date	Meet
Weight Throw (9.08)	35	15.96	Maria Tranchina	10/02/1968	Riccione	15/09/2007	World Masters Athletics Championships
Weight Throw (9.08)	40	14.00	Maria Tranchina	10/02/1968	Enna	25/06/2011	Regional Masters Athletics Championships
Weight Throw (9.08)	45 pre	12.85	Antonella Bevilacqua	17/11/1966	Bologna	26/03/2011	Italian Masters Winter Throws Pentathlon Championships
Weight Throw (9.08)	45	12.67	Alessandra Pizzimenti	21/07/1980	Cosenza	31/05/2026	Regional Athletics Championships
Weight Throw (7.26)	50	15.76	Patrizia Aletta	10/02/1971	Toruń	20/03/2024	European Masters Indoor Athletics Championships
Weight Throw (7.26)	55	15.05	Patrizia Aletta	10/02/1971	Bologna	10/10/2026	Regional Masters Throws Pentathlon Championships
Weight Throw (7.26)	55	14.65	Patrizia Aletta	10/02/1971	Pistoia	12/04/2026	Italian Masters Throws Pentathlon Winter Championships
Weight throw (5.45)	60 pre	16.51	Marzia Zanoboni	03/04/1963	Ancona	10/03/2023	Italian Masters Athletics Championships Winter throws
Weight throw (5.45)	60	16.43	Marzia Zanoboni	03/04/1963	Rome	23/06/2024	Italian Masters Athletics Championships
Weight Throw (5.45)	65	14.89	Brunella Del Giudice	08/02/1943	Bressanone	21/06/2008	Italian Masters Athletics Championships
Weight Throw (5.45)	70	12.89	Anna Maria Camoletto	29/10/1955	Campi Bisenzio	20/09/2026	Italian Masters Athletics Championships
Weight Throw (5.45)	70	12.62	Brunella Del Giudice	08/02/1943	Modena	06/07/2014	Italian Masters Athletics Championships
Weight Throw (4.00)	75	13.18	Brunella Del Giudice	08/02/1943	Eraclea	09/09/2019	European Masters Athletics Championships
Weight throw (4.00)	80	11.42	Brunella Del Giudice	08/02/1943	Ancona	09/03/2023	Italian Masters Athletics Championships Winter throws
Weight Throw (4.00)	85	7.54	Nives Fozzer	14/01/1930	Ancona	26/02/2017	Italian Masters Athletics Championships indoor
Weight throw (4.00)	90	6.59	Nives Fozzer	14/01/1930	Viterbo	13/03/2021	Throws Spring National Masters Championships
Weight Throw (4.00)	95	4.69	Gabre Gabric	14/10/1914	Santhia	02/07/2011	Regional Masters Throws Pentathlon Championships

=== Pentathlon throw F ===
Event	Age	Performance	Athlete	Birthdate	Venue	Date	Meet
Pentathlon throw: Hammer throw-Shot put-Javelin throw-Discus throw-Weight throw
Pentathlon throw	35	3.147 3.641old	Patrizia Aletta	10/02/1971	Misano Adriatico	15/09/2007	World Masters Athletics Championships
Hammer (4) 49.35 - Shot put (4) 10.83 - Discus throw (1) 37.09 - Javelin (600) 27.00 - Weight(9.080) 15.69 761-610-598-432-746
Pentathlon throw	40	2.939 3.340old	Maria Tranchina	10/02/1968	Reggio Calabria	04/06/2011	Gran Prix Masters Throws Pentathlon
Hammer (4) 40.14 - Shot put (4) 11.98 - Discus throw (1) 32.20 - Javelin (600) 18.89 - Weight (9.080) 13.02 667-752-549-314-657
Pentathlon throw	45	3.126 3.496old	Pasqualina Proietti Panunzi	18/05/1971	Ostia	22/04/2017	Italian Masters Throws Pentathlon Winter Championships
Hammer (4) 37.76 - Shot put (4) 11.05 - Discus throw (1) 38.18 - Javelin (600) 17.42 - Weight (9.080) 11.26 695-749-751-322-609
Pentathlon throw	50	3.577 4.193old	Patrizia Aletta	10/02/1971	Bologna	03/09/2023	Regional Masters Throws Pentathlon Championships
Hammer (3) 46.72 - Shot put (3) 11.59 - Discus throw (1) 31.60 - Javelin (500) 24.76 - Weight (7.260) 15.31 845-736-672-502-822
Pentathlon throw	55	3.785	Patrizia Aletta	10/02/1971	Bologna	10/10/2026	Regional Masters Throws Pentathlon Championships
Hammer (3) 44.61 - Shot put (3) 10.52 - Discus throw (1) 29.82 - Javelin (500) 24.24 - Weight (7.260) 15.05 902-726-706-555-896
Pentathlon throw	55	3.690 4.186old	Waltraud Mattedi	26/11/1960	Catania	08/10/2016	Italian Masters Throws Pentathlon Championships
Hammer (3) 36.73 - Shot put (3) 9.73 - Discus throw (1) 34.74 - Javelin (500) 34.80 - Weight (7.260) 10.95 721-666-845-840-618
Pentathlon throw	60	3.809 4.328old	Waltraud Mattedi	26/11/1960	Pistoia	0819/09/2021	Grand Prix Masters Throws Pentathlon
Hammer (3) 35.92 - Shot put (3) 9.93 - Discus throw (1) 31.43 - Javelin (500) 28.74 - Weight (7.260) 12.16 796-756-849-768-640
Pentathlon throw	60	3.809	Waltraud Mattedi	26/11/1960	Pescara	28/09/2023	European Masters Athletics Championships
Hammer (3) 36.07 - Shot put (3) 10.15 - Discus throw (1) 30.60 - Javelin (500) 26.19 - Weight (7.260) 13.46 800-776-823-690-720
Pentathlon throw	65 pre	3.674	Waltraud Mattedi	26/11/1960	Verona	12/10/2025	Regional Masters Athletics Championships
Hammer (3) 28.73 - Shot put (3) 9.18 - Discus throw (1) 29.23 - Javelin (500) 21.09 - Weight (7.260) 11.74 702-775-888-615-694
Pentathlon throw	65	3.627 4.168old	Brunella Del Giudice	08/02/1943	Macerata	27/09/2014	Regional Masters Throws Pentathlon Championships
Hammer (3) 34.84 - Shot put (3) 8.50 - Discus throw (1) 23.85 - Javelin (400*) 21.36 - Weight (5.450) 12.61 878-707-699-589*-754
Pentathlon throw	70	3.867 4.451old	Brunella Del Giudice	08/02/1943	Lahti	07/08/2009	World Masters Athletics Championships
Hammer (3) 31.46 - Shot put (3) 7.75 - Discus throw (1) 23.35 - Javelin (500) 18.35 - Weight (5.450) 12.60 900-719-785-604-859
Pentathlon throw	75	3.802 4.739old	Maria Luisa Fancello	15/02/1943	Catania	14/04/2018	Italian Masters Throws Pentathlon Winter Championships
Hammer (2) 35.57 - Shot put (2) 8.91- Discus throw (0.750) 25.04- Javelin (400) 15.65 - Weight (4) 12.50 886-768-839-514-795
Pentathlon throw	80	3416	Brunella Del Giudice	08/02/1943	Montebelluna	23/07/2023	Regional Masters Throws Pentathlon Championships
Hammer (2) 24.66 - Shot put (2) 7.28 - Discus throw (0.750) 16.86 - Javelin (400) 14.77 - Weight (4) 11.21 690-707-623-569-827
Pentathlon throw	85	2.663 3.262old	Nives Fozzer	14/01/1930	Santhia	09/04/2016	Italian Masters Throws Pentathlon Winter Championships
Hammer (2) 16.77 - Shot put (2) 6.03 - Discus throw (0.750) 10.78 - Javelin (400) 9.26 - Weight (4) 7.41 535-674-442-394-618
Pentathlon throw	90	2.646 3.248old	Nives Fozzer	14/01/1930	Enna	02/10/2021	Italian Masters Throws Pentathlon Championships
Hammer (2) 13.06 - Shot put (2) 5.04 - Discus throw (0.750) 9.74 - Javelin (400) 7.76 - Weight (4) 5.78 505-670-493-399-579
Pentathlon throw	95	3.016 3.779old	Gabre Gabric	14/10/1914	Santhia	02/07/2011	Regional Masters Throws Pentathlon Championships
Hammer (2) 8.79 - Shot put (2) 4.90 - Discus throw (0.750) 10.69 - Javelin (400) 6.75 - Weight (4) 4.69 420-828-726-443-599
The results are adapted to the new point tabels WMA with the New Age Factors Table Combined Events 2023 that is in effect from 1° January 2023
For Throws Pentathlon F60-65-70 from 2014 the weight of javelin was changed from 400 gr to 500 gr
For Throws Pentathlon, in tabel 2023 are changed olso the scoring coefficients of the formula that produce the points for Hammer throw and Weight Throw.
* score calculated with the coefficient for implement then in use.

=== Eptathlon ===
Event	Age	Performance	Athlete	Birthdate	Venue	Date	Meet
Eptathlon: 100hs/80hs-High jump-Shot put-200-Long jump-Javelin throw-800
Eptathlon	35	4.616	Maria Costanza Moroni	23/03/1969	Biella	03/05/2004	Regional Championship Multiple Events
100hs0.84 14.9-1.69-Shot put (4) 8.59-26.1-5.22-Giav (600) 20.27-2:30.3 836- 879- 458- 768- 665- 308- 702
Eptathlon	40	5008	Roberta Sara Colombo	19/08/1973	Mantua	04/06/2017	Italian Multiple Events Masters Championships
80hs0.76 12.29 (-0.6)-1.54-Shot put (4) 8.34-27.47 (0.7)-5.19 (0.4)-Giav (600) 27.05-2:29.40 1030- 736- 425- 728- 853- 474- 762
Eptathlon	45	5.493*	Maria Costanza Moroni	23/03/1969	Santhia	12/07/2015	Regional Gran Prix Multiple Events
100hs0.84 15.27 (-0.9)-1.60-Shot put (4) 8.87-27.24 (-2.3)-5.41 (0.0) -Giav (600) 18.64-2:28.53 966*- 978- 575- 829- 924- 350- 871
Eptathlon	45	4.677	Antonella Giulivi	15/08/1975	Salerno	22/05/2022	Italian Multiple Events Masters Championships
80hs0.76 12.90 (0.0)-1.39-Shot put (4) 7.29-28.30 (-2.0)-4.84 (1.1)-Giav (600) 26.20-2:52.62 956- 689- 451- 742- 723- 528- 588
Eptathlon	50	4.798	Ivana Fella	19/07/1974	Madeira	12/10/2025	European Masters Athletics Championships
80hs0.76 13.13 (2.1)-1.41-Shot put (3) 9.00-29.01 (-1.0)-4.19 (0.2)-Giav (500) 25.28-3:01.09 990- 806- 542- 777- 592- 514- 577
Eptathlon	55	4.320	Ivana Ferrio	31/01/1970	Brugnera	04/05/2025	Italian Multiple Events Masters Championships
80hs0.76 14.97 (-1.6)-1.33-Shot put (3) 7.63-32.13 (-0.4)-3.73 (-1.4)-Giav (500) 19.28-3:02.47 808- 795- 492- 641- 516- 423- 645
Eptathlon	60	4.532**	Ingeborg Zorzi	25/03/1948	Ljubljana	25/07/2008	European Masters Athletics Championships
80hs0.68 15.37 (0.0)-1.28-Shot put (3) 7.60-33.44 (0.0)-3.48 (-0.5)-Giav (400) 22.96-3:14.60 838- 818- 548- 647- 506- 562**- 613
Eptathlon	65	4.635	Ingeborg Zorzi	25/03/1948	İzmir	23/08/2014	European Masters Athletics Championships
80hs0.68 16.72 (0.8)-1.22-Shot put (3) 7.50-35.11 (0.2)-3.62 (-0.3)-Giav (500) 21.71-3:34.48 758- 818- 608- 637- 651- 636- 527
Eptathlon	70	4.401	Ingeborg Zorzi	25/03/1948	Arezzo	03/06/2018	Italian Multiple Events Masters Championships
80hs0.68 17.17 (1.0)-1.06-Shot put (3) 7.31-37.44 (-1.1)-3.13 (0.3)-Giav (500) 18.85-3:49.36 994-818-765-757-643-659-633
Eptathlon	75	3.713	Ingeborg Zorzi	25/03/1948	Pescara	24/09/2023	European Masters Athletics Championships
80hs0.68 21.34 (-0.9)-1.07-Shot put (2) 7.90-43.16 (2.2)-2.81 (0.9)-Giav (400) 14.63-4:20.05 529- 771- 666- 398- 492- 474- 383
Tutti i risultati sono stati rapportati alle nuove tabelle di punteggio Master 2023 con la New Age Factors Table Combined Events 2023 in vigore in Italia dal 1° gennaio
Per l'Eptathlon F60-65-70 dal 2014 il Javelin throw passa da 400 gr a 500 gr
* punteggio calcolato con il coefficiente per il tipo di ostacolo affrontato.
** punteggio calcolato con il coefficiente per l'attrezzo allora in uso.

=== Pentathlon ===
Event	Age	Performance	Athlete	Birthdate	Venue	Date
Pentathlon: 200 m - High jump - Shot put - Long jump - 800 m
Pentathlon	35	3.163	Barbara Ferrarini	25/04/1967	Caorle	18/06/2004
28.63 (-1.1)-1.59-Shot put (4) 8.30-4.62-2:27.01 / 648-818-438-519-740
Pentathlon	40	3.178	Rossella Zanni	13/12/1964	Misano Adriatico	10/06/2006
27.97 (3.1)-1.49-Shot put (4) 8.71-4.10 (1.5)-2:39.96 / 786-783-507-441-661
Pentathlon	45	3.769	Barbara Ferrarini	25/04/1967	San Giovanni Lupatoto	21/10/2012
29.3 (0.6)-1.44-Shot put (4) 8.55-5.04 (0.2)-2:33.0 / 751-818-543-828-829
Pentathlon	50	2.645	Angela Bellomi	06/04/1956	Misano Adriatico	09/06/2006
32.94 (2.4)-1.13-Shot put (3) 8.39-3.36 (3.5)-2:58.03 / 599-491-567-357-631
Pentathlon	55	3.260	Ingeborg Zorzi	25/03/1948	Misano Adriatico	09/06/2006
33.77 (2.4)-1.34-Shot put (3) 7.57-3.80 (2.9)-3:10.75 / 638-891-554-584-593
Pentathlon	60	2.154	Maria Lategana	04/01/1941	Lecce	17/10/2004
37.9-0.95-Shot put (3) 6.01-3.12-3:47.1 / 472-409-465-426-382
All results were compared to the new Master 2010 scoreboard with the New Age Factors Table Combined Events 2010 in force in Italy since 1 January

=== Race walk 3000 m F ===
Event	Age	Performance	Athlete	Birthdate	Venue	Date	Meet
Race walk 3000 m	35	12:06.77	Elisabetta Perrone	09/07/1968	Castelfidardo	06/09/2003	Memorial Criminesi
Race walk 3000 m	40	13:25.14	Rossella Giordano	01/12/1972	Pavia	05/05/2013	Meeting Della Valle
Race walk 3000 m	45	13:55.14	Rosetta La Delfa	14/07/1977	Vercelli	08/06/2025	Trofeo Dellomodarme
Race walk 3000 m	50	14:47.40	Valeria Pedetti	15/10/1973	Ceprano	27/04/2025	Trofeo Fulvio Villa
Race walk 3000 m	55 pre	15:51.0	Peppina Demartis	09/08/1960	Sassari	19/04/2015	Trofeo Provincia di Sassari
Race walk 3000 m	55	16:00.71	Maura Marchiori	24/07/1959	Trento	09/09/2014	Meeting Lagarina
Race walk 3000 m	60	15:56.75	Daniela Ricciutelli	14/11/1956	Rome	19/07/2017	Meeting 'Atletica di sera'
Race walk 3000 m	65 pre	17:49.28	Daniela Ricciutelli	14/11/1956	Tivoli	15/05/2021	Italian Masters Regional Clubs Championships
Race walk 3000 m	65	17:55.73	Daniela Ricciutelli	14/11/1956	Rome	07/05/2022	Italian Masters Regional Clubs Championships
Race walk 3000 m	70 pre	19:04.91	Daniela Ricciutelli	14/11/1956	Latina	13/06/2026	Regional Masters Championships
Race walk 3000 m	70	21:18.56	Rita Del Pinto	05/02/1949	Tivoli	15/05/2021	Italian Masters Regional Clubs Championships
Race walk 3000 m	75	21:42.60	Franca Monasterolo	26/09/1943	Beinasco	07/05/2022	Italian Masters Regional Clubs Championships
Race walk 3000 m	80	21:27.56	Franca Monasterolo	26/09/1943	Giaveno	31/05/2026	Regional Masters Clubs Championships

=== Race walk 5000 m F ===
Event	Age	Performance	Athlete	Birthdate	Venue	Date	Meet
Race walk 5000 m	35	20:12.41	Elisabetta Perrone	09/07/1968	Rieti	02/08/2003	Italian Athletics Championships
Race walk 5000 m	40	22:45.93	Rossella Giordano	01/12/1972	Milan	24/04/2013	Walk & Middle Distance Night
Race walk 5000 m	45	23:24.96	Rosetta La Delfa	14/07/1977	Bra	05/09/2025	Memorial Franco Florio
Race walk 5000 m	50 pre	24:42.05	Valeria Pedetti	15/10/1973	Pescara	24/09/2023	European Masters Athletics Championships
Race walk 5000 m	50	25:34.21	Valeria Pedetti	15/10/1973	Misano Adriatico	20/06/2025	Italian Masters Athletics Championships
Race walk 5000 m	55 pre	26:36.35	Peppina Demartis	09/08/1960	Sassari	15/07/2015	Trofeo Studium et Stadium
Race walk 5000 m	55	27:15.39	Marcella Ioele	04/09/1966	Taranto	21/09/2024	Italian CDS Final B
Race walk 5000 m	60	27:35.36	Daniela Ricciutelli	14/11/1956	Aarhus	31/07/2017	European Masters Athletics Championships
Race walk 5000 m	65	30:57.34	Daniela Ricciutelli	14/11/1956	Rieti	24/04/2022	Trofeo Lazio Di Marcia
Race walk 5000 m	70 pre	33:54.43	Daniela Ricciutelli	14/11/1956	Bellinzona	12/09/2026	Meeting Masters
Race walk 5000 m	70	34:06.0	Franca Monasterolo	26/09/1943	Fossano	24/05/2015	Trofeo Fruttero
Race walk 5000 m	75	36:39.8	Franca Monasterolo	26/09/1943	Pinerolo	02/05/2021	Regional Meet
Race walk 5000 m	80	36:06.19	Franca Monasterolo	26/09/1943	Torino	16/05/2026	Regional Clubs Championships

=== Race walk 10,000 m F ===
Event	Age	Performance	Athlete	Birthdate	Venue	Date	Meet
Race walk 10,000 m	35 pre	42:55.35	Elisa Rigaudo	17/06/1980	Rieti	13/06/2015	Italian Athletics Championships U23 Open
Race walk 10,000 m	35	43:20.38	Valentina Trapletti	12/07/1985	Bergamo	18/04/2021	Walk Clubs Championships gr.Nord
Race walk 10,000 m	40	48:00.02	Elisabetta Perrone	09/07/1968	Rieti	29/03/2009	Walk Italian Athletics Championships
Race walk 10,000 m	45 pre	48:50.86	Rosetta La Delfa	14/07/1977	Alessandria	10/04/2022	Walk Clubs Championships gr.Nord
Race walk 10,000 m	45	49:09.7h	Rosetta La Delfa	14/07/1977	Giaveno	31/05/2025	Regional Masters Clubs Championships
Race walk 10,000 m	50	53:23.43	Valeria Pedetti	15/10/1973	Prato	13/04/2025	Walk Clubs Championships gr.Centro
Race walk 10,000 m	55	56:24.1	Mirella Patti	21/02/1962	Rome	28/04/2019	Walk Clubs Championships
Race walk 10,000 m	55	55:56.47	Mirella Patti	21/02/1962	Livorno	22/04/2018	Walk Clubs Championships
Race walk 10,000 m	60	57:32.79	Maura Marchiori	24/07/1959	Bergamo	18/04/2021	Walk Clubs Championships gr.Nord
Race walk 10,000 m	65	1h03:26.93	Ivana Roggero	24/02/1957	Alessandria	21/05/2022	Regional Athletics Championships

=== Race walk Km 10 road ===
Event	Age	Performance	Athlete	Birthdate	Venue	Date	Meet
Race walk Km 10 road	35	43:08	Elisa Rigaudo	17/06/1980	Turin	24/07/2015	Italian Athletics Championships
Race walk Km 10 road	40	44:13	Valentina Trapletti	12/07/1985	Caorle	03/08/2025	Italian Athletics Championships
Race walk Km 10 road	45	47:28	Rosetta La Delfa	14/07/1977	Caorle	03/08/2025	Italian Athletics Championships
Race walk Km 10 road	50	51:52	Valeria Pedetti	15/10/1973	Gothenburg	17/08/2024	World Masters Athletics Championships
Race walk Km 10 road	55	56:42	Peppina Demartis	09/08/1960	Aarhus	03/08/2017	European Masters Athletics Championships
Race walk Km 10 road	60 pre	57:19	Giuliana Salce	16/06/1955	Grosseto	15/05/2015	Non Stadia European Masters Championships
Race walk Km 10 road	60	58:30	Maura Marchiori	24/07/1959	Modena	18/10/2020	Italian Race Walking Championships
Race walk Km 10 road	65	1h03:28	Daniela Ricciutelli	14/11/1956	Grosseto	13/05/2022	Non Stadia European Masters Championships
Race walk Km 10 road	70	1h08:51	Franca Monasterolo	26/09/1943	Lanzo Torinese	25/05/2014	Walk Gran Prix
Race walk Km 10 road	75	1h16:22	Alda De Grandis	10/11/1914	Sanremo	27/09/1992	
Race walk Km 10 road	80	1h14:51	Franca Maria Monasterolo	26/09/1943	Catania	01/05/2026	Non Stadia European Masters Championships
Race walk Km 10 road	80	1h16:01	Franca Maria Monasterolo	26/09/1943	Alessandria	15/10/2023	CDS Masters Walk 10 km

=== Race walk Km 20 road F ===
Event	Age	Performance	Athlete	Birthdate	Venue	Date	Meet
Race walk Km 20 road	35	1h27:28 (+)	Antonella Palmisano	06/08/1991	Birmingham	15/08/2026	2026 European Athletics Championships
Race walk Km 20 road	40 pre	1h32:16	Valentina Trapletti	12/07/1985	La Coruña	08/06/2025	Gran Premio Cantones de A Coruña de Marcha
Race walk Km 20 road	40	1h40:00	Rosetta La Delfa	14/07/1977	Grottaglie	07/03/2021	20 km Race Walking Italian Championships
Race walk Km 20 road	45	1h39:55	Rosetta La Delfa	14/07/1977	Frosinone	19/03/2023	20 km Race Walking Italian Championships
Race walk Km 20 road	50 pre	1h50:43	Maura Marchiori	24/07/1959	Lugano	08/03/2009	Memorial Mario Albisetti
Race walk Km 20 road	50	1h51:46	Valeria Pedetti	15/10/1973	Prato	13/10/2024	Italian Masters Race Walking Championships
Race walk Km 20 road	55	1h55:00	Giuseppina Migliasso	16/08/1937	Gradisca d'Isonzo	04/10/1992	
Race walk Km 20 road	60	2h01:59	Maura Marchiori	24/07/1959	Ostia	23/01/2021	Race Walking Italian Championships
Race walk Km 20 road	65	2h16:24	Ivana Roggero	24/02/1957	Alessandria	26/10/2025	Italian Masters Race Walking Championships
Race walk Km 20 road	70 pre	2h33:18	Rita Del Pinto	05/02/1949	Gioiosa Marea	27/01/2019	Italian Masters Championships
Race walk Km 20 road	80	2h33:57	Franca Maria Monasterolo	26/09/1943	Alessandria	26/10/2025	Italian Masters Race Walking Championships

=== 80 m ===
Event	Age	Performance	Athlete	Birthdate	Venue	Date
80 m	35	9.8 (+0.8 m/s)	Lusia Puleanga	24/12/1973	Aulla	26/04/2009
wind aid	35	9.96 (+2.8 m/s)	Daniela Lai	15/01/1979	Cagliari	03/04/2015
80 m	40	10.03	Maria Costanza Moroni	23/03/1969	Santhia	24/03/2012
80 m	45	10.61 (+1.1 m/s)	Antonella Giulivi	15/08/1975	Pavia	18/04/2022
80 m	50 pre	10.59 (+1.1 m/s)	Cristina Sanulli	21/11/1972	Pavia	18/04/2022
80 m	55	11.59 (−1.6 m/s)	Veronica Bartolini	24/04/1970	Monsummano Terme	12/04/2025
80 m	60	11.76 (+1.6 m/s)	Maria Roberta Persico	04/05/1964	Correggio	07/09/2024
80 m	65	13.96 (±0.0 m/s)	Nadia Ruggieri	16/07/1959	Colleferro	29/03/2025
80 m	70 pre	13.01 (−0.2 m/s)	Anna Micheletti	27/06/1952	Colleferro	26/03/2022
80 m	75 pre	13.01 (−0.2 m/s)	Elvia Di Giulio	26/04/1947	Colleferro	26/03/2022

=== 150 m ===
Event	Age	Performance	Athlete	Birthdate	Venue	Date
150 m	35	17.08	Amy Fabè Dia	14/02/1977	Mestre	01/04/2012
150 m	40	18.73 (+0.2 m/s)	Daniela Lai	15/01/1979	Santadi	27/03/2021
150 m	45	19.72 (−1.7 m/s)	Denise Neumann	14/01/1971	Lugano	01/05/2019
150 m	50	20.60 (±0.0 m/s)	Daniela Ferrian	12/09/1961	Novara	17/04/2011
150 m	55	21.30 (−0.2 m/s)	Gianna Lanzini	11/03/1960	Florence	16/05/2015
150 m	60	22.87 (+0.4 m/s)	Anna Micheletti	27/06/1952	Rome	25/04/2013
150 m	65	23.26 (+0.2 m/s)	Anna Beatrice Micheletti	27/06/1952	Ostia	25/04/2018
150 m	70	30.5	Noretta Piperno	31/01/1936	Rome	25/04/2008

=== 300 m ===
Event	Age	Performance	Athlete	Birthdate	Venue	Date
300 m	35	40.70	Giuseppina Perlino	06/10/1965	Bellinzona	27/07/2002
300 m		41.08	Giuseppina Perlino	06/10/1965	Chiasso	01/05/2002
300 m	40	41.5	Maria Costanza Moroni	23/03/1969	Vercelli	26/03/2011
300 m	45	43.23	Emmanuela Baggiolini	10/06/1972	Chiasso	01/05/2017
300 m	50	45.6	Daniela Ferrian	12/09/1961	Asti	02/04/2011
300 m	55	48.31	Gianna Lanzini	11/03/1960	Florence	16/05/2015
300 m	60	49.50	Gianna Lanzini	11/03/1960	Cecina	17/04/2021
300 m	65	53.25	Anna Beatrice Micheletti	27/06/1952	Rieti	24/04/2017

=== 500 m ===
Event	Age	Performance	Athlete	Birthdate	Venue	Date
500 m	35	1:13.84	Patrizia Spuri	18/02/1973	Latina	02/05/2010
500 m	40	1:16.18	Maria Sgromo	19/09/1975	Pavia	12/04/2015
500 m	45	1:22.50	Gigliola Giorgi	07/10/1968	Rome	24/04/2016
500 m	50	1:27.68	Gigliola Giorgi	07/10/1968	Rome	25/04/2019
500 m	55	1:32.55	Daniela Dinale	14/12/1962	Rome	25/04/2018
500 m	60	1:35.78	Anna Micheletti	27/06/1952	Rome	25/04/2013
500 m	65	1:40.82	Anna Beatrice Micheletti	27/06/1952	Rome	04/02/2017

=== 600 m ===
Event	Age	Performance	Athlete	Birthdate	Venue	Date
600 m	35	1:31.82	Emanuela Baggiolini	10/06/1972	Kreuzlingen	02/06/2011
600 m	40	1:34.96	Emanuela Baggiolini	10/06/1972	Chiasso	01/05/2013
600 m	45	1:39.92	Emanuela Baggiolini	10/06/1972	Monselice	17/10/2021
600 m	50	1:43.61	Elena Montini	08/11/1962	Chiasso	01/05/2012
600 m	55	1:50.21	Cristina Gallì	17/03/1968	Brescia	08/04/2023
600 m	60	2:01.64	Anna Micheletti	27/06/1952	Rome	11/01/2014
600 m	65	2:05.04	Anna Beatrice Micheletti	27/06/1952	Rome	08/04/2017
600 m	70 pre	2:16.74	Anna Beatrice Micheletti	27/06/1952	Rome	25/04/2022
600 m	75	3:36.58	Tina Ganguzza	04/12/1935	Voghera	14/07/2013

=== 1000 m ===
Event	Age	Performance	Athlete	Birthdate	Venue	Date
1000 m	35	2:55.70	Emanuela Baggiolini	10/06/1972	Milan	07/05/2011
1000 m	40	2:55.74	Emanuela Baggiolini	10/06/1972	Voghera	11/10/2014
1000 m	45	3:01.14	Paola Tiselli	13/07/1973	Rome	25/04/2018
1000 m	50	3:01.56	Mara Cerini	25/05/1971	Milan	25/09/2021
1000 m	55	3:18.82	Cristina Gallì	17/03/1968	Pavia	23/04/2023
1000 m	60	3:41.86	Maria Lorenzoni	10/12/1957	Soncino	22/09/2018
1000 m	65	3:53.02	Anna Patelli	27/04/1958	Fiumicino	24/06/2023
1000 m	70	5:25.56	Maria Pirastu	01/08/1943	Voghera	10/10/2015

=== Mile ===
Event	Age	Performance	Athlete	Birthdate	Venue	Date
Mile	35	4:36.75	Agnese Possamai	17/01/1953	Pescara	19/07/1989
Mile	35	4:46.27	Eleonora Berlanda	06/04/1976	Pavia	04/05/2014
Mile	40	5:03.2	Jocelyne Farruggia	26/01/1962	Rome	03/04/2004
Mile	45	5:14.39	Alessandra Lena	11/08/1970	Udine	25/04/2019
Mile	50	5:19.43	Mara Cerini	25/05/1971	Pioltello	09/10/2021
Mile	55	5:41.00	Emanuela Massa	17/12/1966	Genoa	10/10/2021
Mile	60	6:07.20	Annamaria Galbani	23/01/1952	Pioltello	06/05/2015
Mile	65	6:50.8	Annamaria Vaghi	24/02/1951	Voghera	09/04/2016
Mile	70	7:26.98	Annamaria Vaghi	24/02/1951	Vignate	19/06/2021
Mile	75	9:16.21	Irene Stringo	05/11/1942	Pioltello	25/03/2017

=== 2000 m ===
Event	Age	Performance	Athlete	Birthdate	Venue	Date
2000 m	35	5:58.05	Eleonora Berlanda	06/04/1976	Rovereto	12/04/2014
2000 m	40	6:39.46	Paola Tiselli	13/07/1973	Orvieto	05/04/2014
2000 m	45	6:46.66	Simona Viola	18/11/1971	Voghera	25/04/2017
2000 m	50	7:07.49	Jocelyne Farruggia	26/01/1962	Rome	16/04/2016
2000 m	55	7:28.13	Maria Lorenzoni	10/12/1957	Rovereto	14/04/2012
2000 m	60 pre	7:52.03	Maria Lorenzoni	10/12/1957	Lugano	19/08/2017
2000 m	60	7:59.6	Annamaria Galbani	23/01/1952	Milan	24/04/2013

== See also ==
- List of world records in masters athletics
- List of European records in masters athletics
- List of Italian records in athletics
