= 2007 Italian Athletics Championships =

- Dates: 26–28 July
- Host city: Padua
- Venue: Stadio Euganeo
- Level: Senior
- Events: 44

The 2007 Italian Athletics Championships was the 97th edition of the Italian Athletics Championships and were held in Padua.

== Men ==
Event	Gold		Silver		Bronze	
100 m	Koura Kaba Fantoni	10"57	Fabio Cerutti	10"57	Rosario La Mastra	10"65
200 m	Andrew Howe	20"53	Matteo Galvan	21"25	Alessandro Cavallaro	21"29
400 m	Andrea Barberi	45"79	Stefano Braciola	46"26	Teo Turchi	46"90
800 m	Livio Sciandra	1'51"18	Andrea Longo	1'51"52	Maurizio Bobbato	1'51"74
1500 m	Christian Obrist	3'50"37	Lorenzo Perrone	3'51"14	Christian Neunhauserer	3'51"15
5000 m	Daniele Meucci	14'07"01	Salvatore Vincenti	14'14"01	Stefano Scaini	14'14"75
10,000 m	Daniele Meucci	29'33"71	Denis Curzi	29'36"12	Danilo Goffi	29'47"79
3000 m steeplechase	Yuri Floriani	8'43"84	Matteo Villani	8'53"40	Paolo Zanatta	8'57"69
110 m hs	Emanuele Abate	14"00	Paolo Dal Molin	14"26	Andrea Alterio	14"29
400 m hs	Claudio Citterio	51"12	Markus Crepaz	51"20	Federico Rubeca	51"74
Racewalk 10,000 m	Alex Schwazer	49'39"21	Jean Jacques Nkouloukidi	41'00"11	Lorenzo Civallero	41'37"66
4×100 m relay	Gruppo Sportivo Fiamme Oro; Luca Simoni; Maurizio Checcucci; Luca Verdecchia; Giuseppe Aita	40"05	Centro Sportivo Carabinieri; Sergio Riva; Alessandro Rocco; Marco Cuneo; Rosario La Mastra	40"79	Atletica Riccardi; Lorenzo La Naia; Davide Vasco; Francesco D'Ambrosi; Fabio Cerutti	41"22
4×400 m relay	Centro Sportivo Carabinieri; Domenico Rao; Maurizio Bobbato; Luca Galletti; Marco Salvucci	3'11"91	Atletica Cento Torri Pavia; Roberto Severi; Marco Marsadri; Diego Zuodar; Cristian Lancini	3'12"38	Assindustria Sport Padova; Emanuele Bortolozzo; Stefano Bontumasi; Alessio Ramalli; Paolo Zani	3'15"00
High jump	Filippo Campioli	2,26 m	Nicola Ciotti	2,24 m	Sandro Finesi	2,16 m
Pole vault	Matteo Rubbiani	5,20 m	Sergio D'Orio; Emanuele Formichetti	5,10 m	-	
Long jump	Andrew Howe	8,40 m	Nicola Trentin	7,75 m	Mattia Nuara	7,72 m
Triple jump	Fabrizio Donato	16,97 m	Michele Boni	16,48 m	Paolo Camossi	16,46 m
Shot put	Paolo Capponi	18,99 m	Paolo Dal Soglio	18,51 m	Marco Di Maggio	18,43 m
Discus throw	Hannes Kirchler	60,14 m	Diego Fortuna	58,16 m	Marco Zitelli	56,47 m
Hammer throw	Nicola Vizzoni	77,98 m	Lorenzo Povegliano	74,67 m	Pellegrino Delli Carri	69,19 m
Javelin throw	Daniele Crivellaro	72,30 m	Alessandro Baudone	70,66 m	Francesco Pignata	68,98 m
Decathlon	Paolo Mottadelli	7517 p.	Luca Ceglie	7435 p.	William Frullani	7113 p.

== Women ==
Event	Gold		Silver		Bronze	
100 m	Anita Pistone	11"78	Maria Aurora Salvagno	11"96	Chiara Gervasi	11"98
200 m	Anita Pistone	23"76	Manuela Grillo	24"11	Giulia Arcioni	24"12
400 m	Daniela Reina	52"31	Marta Milani	53"76	Lara Rocco	54"05
800 m	Elisa Cusma	2'02"59	Antonella Riva	2'03"29	Elisabetta Artuso	2'03"57
1500 m	Silvia Weissteiner	4'15"27	Eleonora Berlanda	4'16"27	Elena Romagnolo	4'18"07
5000 m	Claudia Pinna	16'39"34	Silvia Sommaggio	16'40"54	Barbara La Barbera	16'45"04
10,000 m	Gloria Marconi	33'26"95	Silvia Sommaggio	33'37"79	Claudia Pinna	33'41"59
3000 m steeplechase	Elena Romagnolo	9'51"93	Emma Quaglia	10'23"71	Cecilia Sampietro	10'26"93
100 m hs	Micol Cattaneo	13"52	Marzia Caravelli	13"91	Sara Balduchelli	13"95
400 m hs	Benedetta Ceccarelli	56"59	Manuela Gentili	57"04	Elisa Scardanzan	58"53
Racewalk 5000 m	Elisa Rigaudo	21'45"46	Valentina Trapletti	23'20"46	Annarita Fidanza	23'41"55
4×100 m relay	Centro sportivo olimpico dell'Esercito; Stefania Ferrante; Daniela Graglia; Rita De Cesaris; Anita Pistone	46"34	Atletica Camelot; Sara Balduchelli; Giulia Bossi; Marta Avogadri; Elena Sordelli	46"89	Pro Sesto Atletica; Silvia Cavenago; Giovanna Perego; Chiara Colombo; Cinzia Nicassio	47"31
4×400 m relay	Gruppo Sportivo Forestale; Anna Pane; Patrizia Spuri; Elisabetta Artuso; Manuela Grillo	3'40"76	Centro sportivo olimpico dell'Esercito; Chiara Bazzoni; Ursula Ellecosta; Elisa Cusma; Francesca Endrizzi	3'40"91	Atletica Camelot; Marina Mambretti; Chiara Nichetti; Zoe Anello; Eleonora Sirtoli	3'42"66
High jump	Antonietta Di Martino	1,91 m	Stefania Cadamuro	1,87 m	Elena Meuti	1,85 m
Pole vault	Anna Giordano Bruno	4,30 m	Elena Scarpellini	4,20 m	Arianna Farfaletti Casali	4,00 m
Long jump	Tania Vicenzino	6,50 m	Thaimi O'Reilly Causse	6,38 m	Valeria Canella	6,37 m
Triple jump	Magdelín Martínez	14,22 m	Simona La Mantia	13,78 m	Thaimi O'Reilly Causse	13,64 m
Shot put	Chiara Rosa	19,13 m	Assunta Legnante	18,78 m	Elena Carini	14,77 m
Discus throw	Cristiana Checchi	57,93 m	Valentina Aniballi	56,36 m	Giorgia Baratella	55,17 m
Hammer throw	Clarissa Claretti	67,95 m	Silvia Salis	66,19 m	Ester Balassini	64,68 m
Javelin throw	Claudia Coslovich	59,88 m	Zahra Bani	58,32 m	Luana Picchianti	50,34 m
Heptathlon	Elisa Trevisan	5690 p.	Francesca Doveri	5276 p.	Laura Rendina	5079 p.
