= 2006 Italian Athletics Indoor Championships =

- Dates: 18–19 February
- Host city: Ancona
- Venue: Palaindoor di Ancona
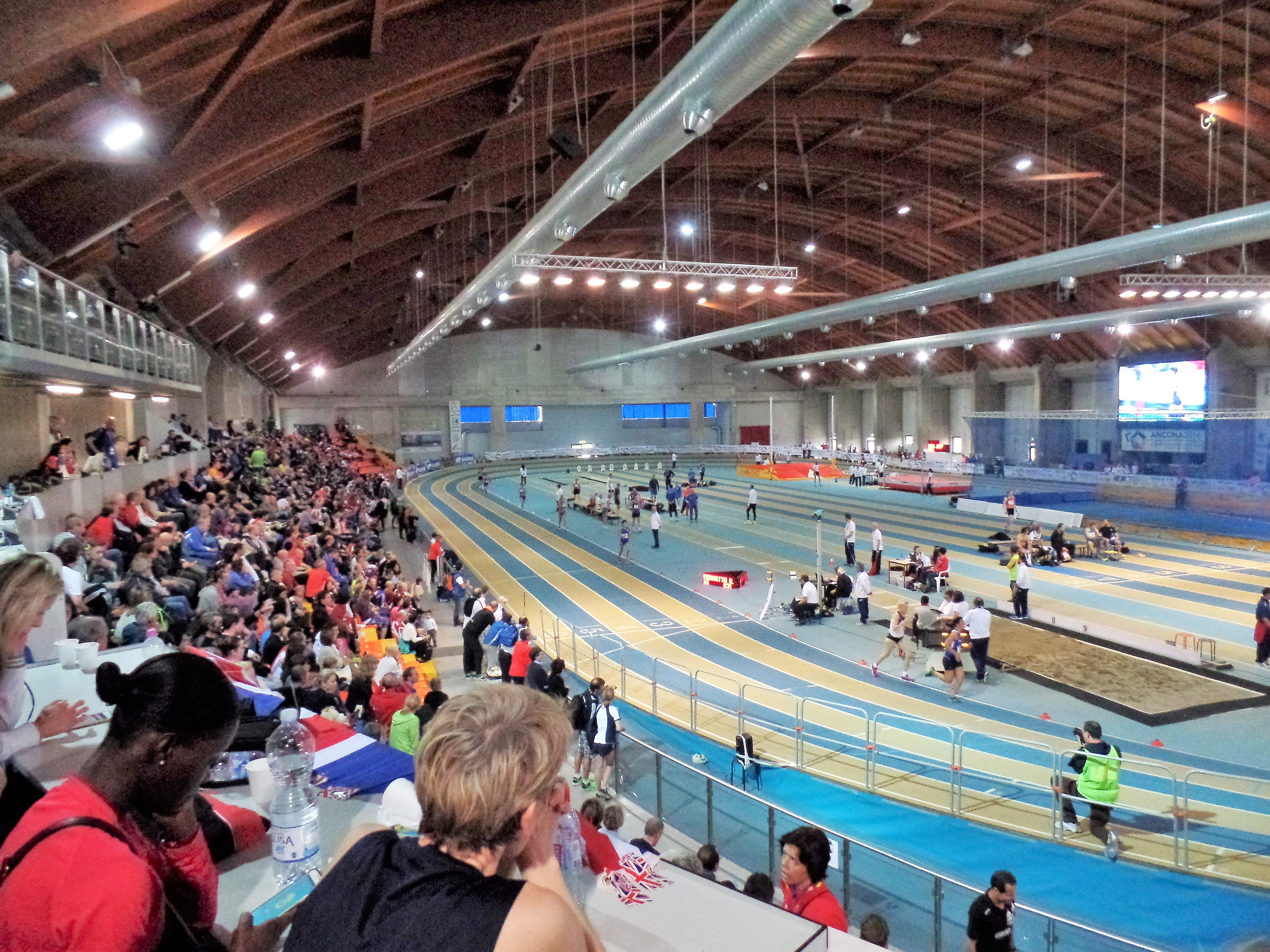
- Level: Senior
- Events: 26 (13 men, 13 women) + relays

2006 Italian Athletics Indoor Championships was the 37th edition of the Italian Athletics Indoor Championships and were held in Ancona.

== Champions ==
=== Men ===
Event	Winner	Performance
60 m	Francesco Scuderi	6.69
400 m	Gianni Carabelli	48.51
800 m	Maurizio Bobbato	1:51.76
1500 m	Christian Obrist	3:47.67
3000 m	Cosimo Caliandro	8:05.05
60 m hs	Andrea Giaconi	7.79
High jump	Nicola Ciotti	2.25
Pole vault	Matteo Rubbiani	5.30
Long jump	Andrew Howe	8.10
Triple jump	Fabrizio Donato	17.24
Shot put	Marco Dodoni	19.28
Heptathlon	Luca Ceglie	5565
5000 m walk	Giorgio Rubino	19:33.74
Relay	Atletica Macerata	

=== Women ===
Event	Winner	Performance
60 m	Manuela Grillo	7.45
400 m	Daniela Reina	54.13
800 m	Alexia Oberstolz	2:04.85
1500 m	Elisa Cusma	4:17.17
3000 m	Silvia Weissteiner	8:59.75
60 m hs	Margaret Macchiut	8.20
High jump	Antonietta Di Martino	1.91
Pole vault	Anna Giordano Bruno	4.20
Long jump	Valeria Canella	6.48
Triple jump	Simona La Mantia	14.24
Shot put	Chiara Rosa	18.41
Pentathlon	Cecilia Ricali	4080
3000 m walk	Elisa Rigaudo	12:10.61

== See also ==
- 2006 Italian Athletics Championships
