= 2011 Italian Athletics Indoor Championships =

- Dates: 19-20 February
- Host city: Ancona
- Venue: Palaindoor di Ancona
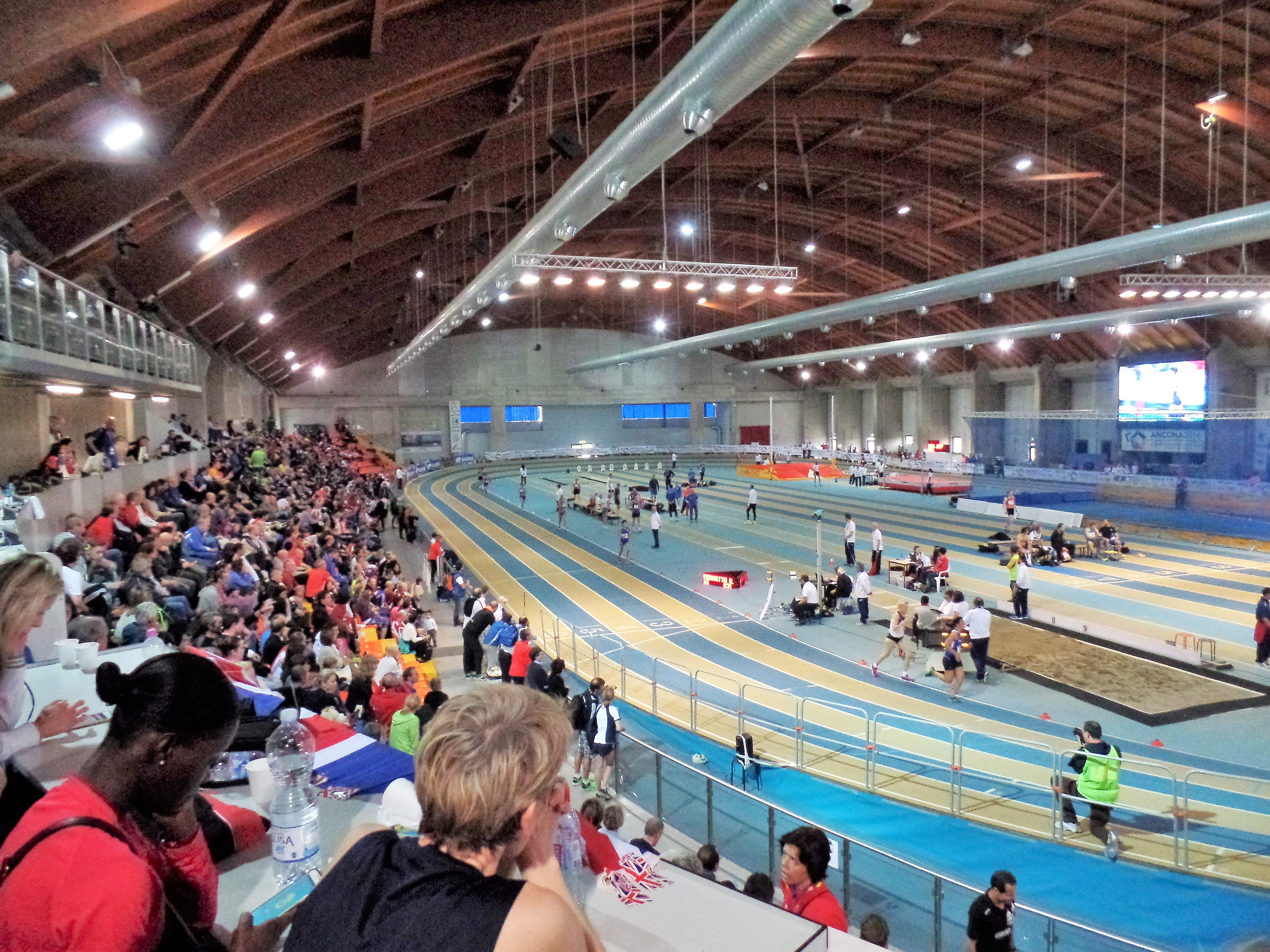
- Level: Senior
- Events: 24 + relays

2011 Italian Athletics Indoor Championships was the 42nd edition of the Italian Athletics Indoor Championships and were held in Ancona.

== Champions ==
=== Men ===
Event	1st place	Performance	2nd place	Performance	3rd place	Performance
60 m	Michael Tumi	6.71 PB	Emanuele Di Gregorio	6.72	Roberto Donati	6.73
400 m	Lorenzo Valentini	48.08 PB	Isalbet Juarez	48.31 SB	Filippo Costanti	49.14
800 m	Giordano Benedetti	1:52.19	Lukas Rifesser	1:52.48	Livio Sciandra	1:53.62
1500 m	Marco Najibe Salami	3:44.09	Stefano La Rosa	3:44.49 PB	Christian Obrist	3:44.78
3000 m	Simone Gariboldi	8:08.68	Yuri Floriani	8:08.70 SB	Ahmed El Mazoury	8:08.98 PB
60 m hs	Emanuele Abate	7.83	Stefano Tedesco	7.89 SB	Carlo Giuseppe Redaelli	7.92 PB
Race walk 5000 m	Riccardo Macchia	20:09.99 PB	Daniele Masciadri	20:26.43 PB	Vincenzo Magliulo	20:29.43 SB
High jump	Nicola Ciotti	2.25	Filippo Campioli	2.23 SB	Marco Fassinotti	2.23
Pole vault	Giorgio Piantella	5.55 PB	Claudio Michel Stecchi	5.50 PB	Matteo Rubbiani	5.40 SB
Long jump	Fabrizio Donato	8.03 PB	Emanuele Formichetti	7.70	Ferdinando Iucolano	7.60 SB
Triple jump	Fabrizio Schembri	17.00 SB	Daniele Greco	16.65 SB	Michele Boni	16.23 SB
Shot put	Marco Di Maggio	18.41 SB	Paolo Dal Soglio	17.82 SB	Andrea Ricci	17.78 SB

=== Women ===
Event	1st place	Performance	2nd place	Performance	3rd place	Performance
60 m	Manuela Levorato	7.44	Maria Aurora Salvagno	7.48 SB	Ilenia Draisci	7.48 SB
400 m	Marta Milani	53.09 PB	Maria Enrica Spacca	53.35 PB	Chiara Bazzoni	53.82 PB
800 m	Elisabetta Artuso	2:11.54	Serena Monachino	2:12.25	Lorenza Canali	2:12.58
1500 m	Sara Palmas	4:29.79 SB	Eleonora Berlanda	4:30.70	Giulia Viola	4:31.15
3000 m	Silvia Weissteiner	9:22.39 SB	Micaela Bonessi	9:24.09 SB	Eleonora Berlanda	9:28.29 SB
60 m hs	Giulia Pennella	8.17	Francesca Doveri	8.30 PB	Veronica Borsi	8.30 PB
Race walk 3000 m	Sibilla Di Vincenzo	12:42.61 SB	Eleonora Giorgi	12:51.59 PB	Serena Pruner	13:12.98 PB
High jump	Raffaella Lamera	1.90 SB	Chiara Vitobello	1.86 SB	Giovanna Demo	1.81 PB
Pole vault	Anna Giordano Bruno	4.30	Giorgia Benecchi	4.25 SB	Giulia Cargnelli	4.10 SB
Long jump	Laura Strati	6.29 PB	Francesca Doveri	6.23 SB	Teresa Di Loreto	6.21 PB
Triple jump	Simona La Mantia	14.33	Silvia Cucchi	13.48 SB	Eleonora D'Elicio	13.46 PB
Shot put	Chiara Rosa	18.34 SB	Julaika Nicoletti	16.08	Elena Carini	15.80 SB

== See also ==
- 2011 Italian Athletics Championships
