= 2006 Italian Athletics Championships =

- Dates: 7–8 July
- Host city: Turin
- Level: Senior
- Events: 42

The 2006 Italian Athletics Championships was the 96th edition of the Italian Athletics Championships and were held in Turin.

== Men ==
Event	Gold		Silver		Bronze	
100 m	Luca Verdecchia	10"42	Maurizio Checcucci	10"51	Massimiliano Donati	10"51
200 m	Stefano Anceschi	20"90	Alessandro Cavallaro	20"97	Marco Cuneo	21"15
400 m	Andrea Barberi	46"04	Claudio Licciardello	46"72	Edoardo Vallet	47"37
800 m	Maurizio Bobbato	1'50"80	Andrea Longo	1'50"85	Livio Sciandra	1'50"94
1500 m	Christian Obrist	3'44"53	Lorenzo Perrone	3'45"23	Christian Neunhauserer	3'45"73
5000 m	Cosimo Caliandro	13'50"97	Stefano La Rosa	13'51"38	Daniele Meucci	13'53"40
10,000 m	Daniele Meucci	28'44"79	Marco Mazza	28'52"93	Denis Curzi	28'54"16
3000 m steeplechase	Angelo Iannelli	8'48"75	Stefano Ciallella	8'57"72	Emanuele Corsini	9'01"62
110 m hs	Andrea Giaconi	14"06	Andrea Cocchi	14"06	Emiliano Pizzoli	14"07
400 m hs	Gianni Carabelli	49"79	Federico Rubeca	50"90	Markus Crepaz	52"03
Racewalk 10,000 m	Ivano Brugnetti	39'48"52	Marco Giungi	40'19"46	Jean Jacques Nkouloukidi	40'32"58
4 × 100 m relay	Gruppo Sportivo Fiamme Oro; Luca Verdecchia; Maurizio Checcucci; Federico Dell'Aquila; Lorenzo Tendi	40"22	Centro Sportivo Carabinieri; Sergio Riva; Massimiliano Dentali; Stefano Bellotto; Marco Cuneo	40"67	Ateltica AVIS Macerata; Marco Ruffini; Marco Ravagli; Carlo Nardi; Alessandro Berdini	41"54
4 × 400 m relay	Centro Sportivo Carabinieri; Domenico Rao; Luca Galletti; Jacopo Marin; Gianni Carabelli	3'12"53	CUS Torino; Jacopo Portera; Davide Rodia; Paolo Bacchiarello; Salvatore Floris	3'17"82	Società Ginnastica Amsicora; Nicolò Businco; Samuele Lilliu; Enrico Murgia; Alessandro Pintadu	3'17"93
High jump	Giulio Ciotti	2,25 m	Nicola Ciotti	2,25 m	Alessandro Talotti	2,21 m
Pole vault	Giorgio Piantella	5,30 m	Manfred Menz; Nicola Tronca	5,00 m	-	
Long jump	Ferdinando Iucolano	7,87 m	Francesco Agresti	7,86 m	Massimo Marraffa	7,73 m
Triple jump	Fabrizio Donato	17,24 m	Fabrizio Schembri	16,77 m	Emanuele Sardano	16,00 m
Shot put	Paolo Capponi	18,98 m	Marco Dodoni	18,89 m	Marco Di Maggio	17,90 m
Discus throw	Hannes Kirchler	60,33 m	Diego Fortuna	59,27 m	Cristiano Andrei	58,51 m
Hammer throw	Nicola Vizzoni	76,11 m	Marco Lingua	76,03 m	Lorenzo Povegliano	71,86 m
Javelin throw	Francesco Pignata	74,67 m	Paolo Casarsa	70,95 m	Daniele Crivellaro	67,98 m

== Women ==
Event	Gold		Silver		Bronze	
100 m	Elena Sordelli	11"83	Manuela Grillo	11"87	Maria Aurora Salvagno	11"97
200 m	Daniela Graglia	23"90	Simona Capano	23"95	Tiziana Grasso	24"07
400 m	Daniela Reina	52"46	Martina Rosati	54"09	Maria Enrica Spacca	54"28
800 m	Elisa Cusma	2'05"72	Antonella Riva	2'06"57	Chiara Nichetti	2'06"67
1500 m	Eleonora Berlanda	4'15"98	Eleonora Riga	4'19"65	Rosanna Martin	4'23"31
5000 m	Silvia Weissteiner	15'46"35	Renate Rungger	15'57"91	Adelina De Soccio	16'09"42
10,000 m	Gloria Marconi	33'08"46	Silvia Sommaggio	33'13"31	Vincenza Sicari	33'51"64
3000 m steeplechase	Sara Orsi	11'09"62	Maria Rosaria Moretti	11'25"57	Rosa Luchena	11'25"93
100 m hs	Margaret Macchiut	13"23	Micol Cattaneo	13"34	Marzia Caravelli	13"68
400 m hs	Benedetta Ceccarelli	57"75	Valentina Boffelli	58"20	Elisa Scardanzan	58"73
Racewalk 5 000 m	Rossella Giordano	21'28"74	Giuseppina Bottero	23'18"41	Emanuela Perilli	23'21"96
4 × 100 m relay	Centro sportivo olimpico dell'Esercito; Stefania Ferrante; Rita De Cesaris; Anita Pistone; Daniela Graglia	46"33	ACSI Italia Atletica; Giulia Crispiani; Eleonora Smargiassi; Margaret Macchiut; Chiara Gervasi	46"52	Atletica Camelot; Giulia Bossi; Sara Balduchelli; Marta Avogadri; Elea Sordelli	46"59
4 × 400 m relay	Centro sportivo olimpico dell'Esercito; Ursula Ellecosta; Francesca Endrizzi; Elisa Cusma; Daniela Graglia	3'42"07	Gruppo Sportivo Forestale; Valentina Boffelli; Anna Pane; Maria Enrica Spacca; Giulia Arcioni	3'43"58	Nuova Atletica Fanfulla Lodigiana; Marzia Facchetti; Sara Rigamonti; Stefania Baldi; Simona Capano	3'49"27
High jump	Antonietta Di Martino	1,91 m	Daniela Galeotti	1,87 m	Elena Meuti	1,84 m
Pole vault	Arianna Farfaletti Casali	4,15 m	Anna Giordano Bruno	4,15 m	Elena Scarpellini	4,15 m
Long jump	Valeria Canella	6,29 m	Laura Gatto	6,24 m	Ilaria Beltrami	6,16 m
Triple jump	Simona La Mantia	14,21 m	Silvia Biondini	13,53 m	Laura Tosoni	13,24 m
Shot put	Chiara Rosa	18,24 m	Assunta Legnante	17,99 m	Cristiana Checchi	17,31 m
Discus throw	Laura Bordignon	53,31 m	Cristiana Checchi	56,25 m	Giorgia Baratella	53,94 m
Hammer throw	Clarissa Claretti	71,49 m	Ester Balassini	65,93 m	Silvia Salis	62,52 m
Javelin throw	Zahra Bani	60,38 m	Claudia Coslovich	56,71 m	Elena De Lazzari	50,11 m
