= 2026 Italian Athletics Indoor Championships =

Edition of the Italian Athletics Indoor Championships

- Dates: 27 February - 1 March
- Host city: Ancona
- Venue: PalaCasali
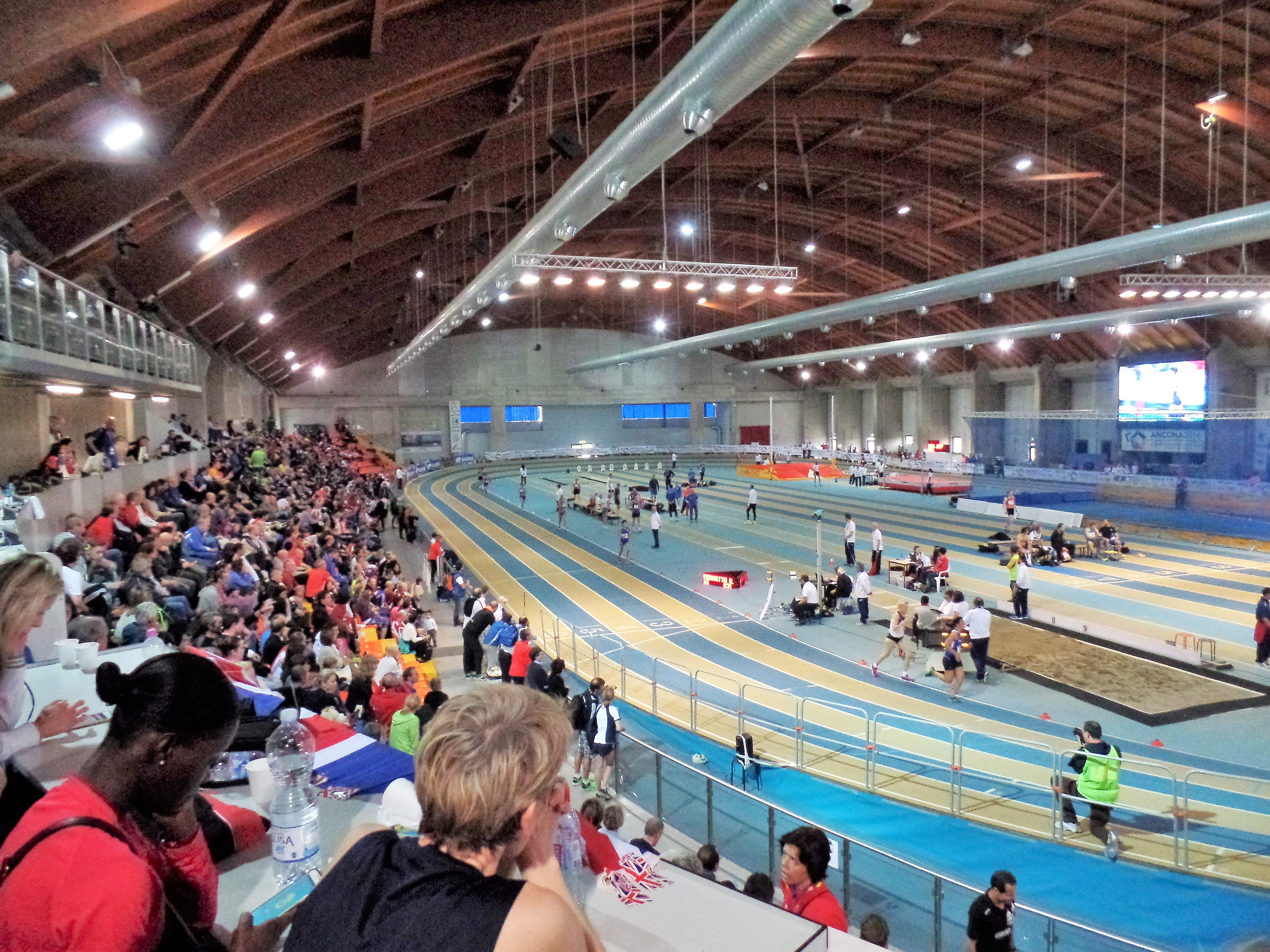
- Level: Senior
- Events: 26

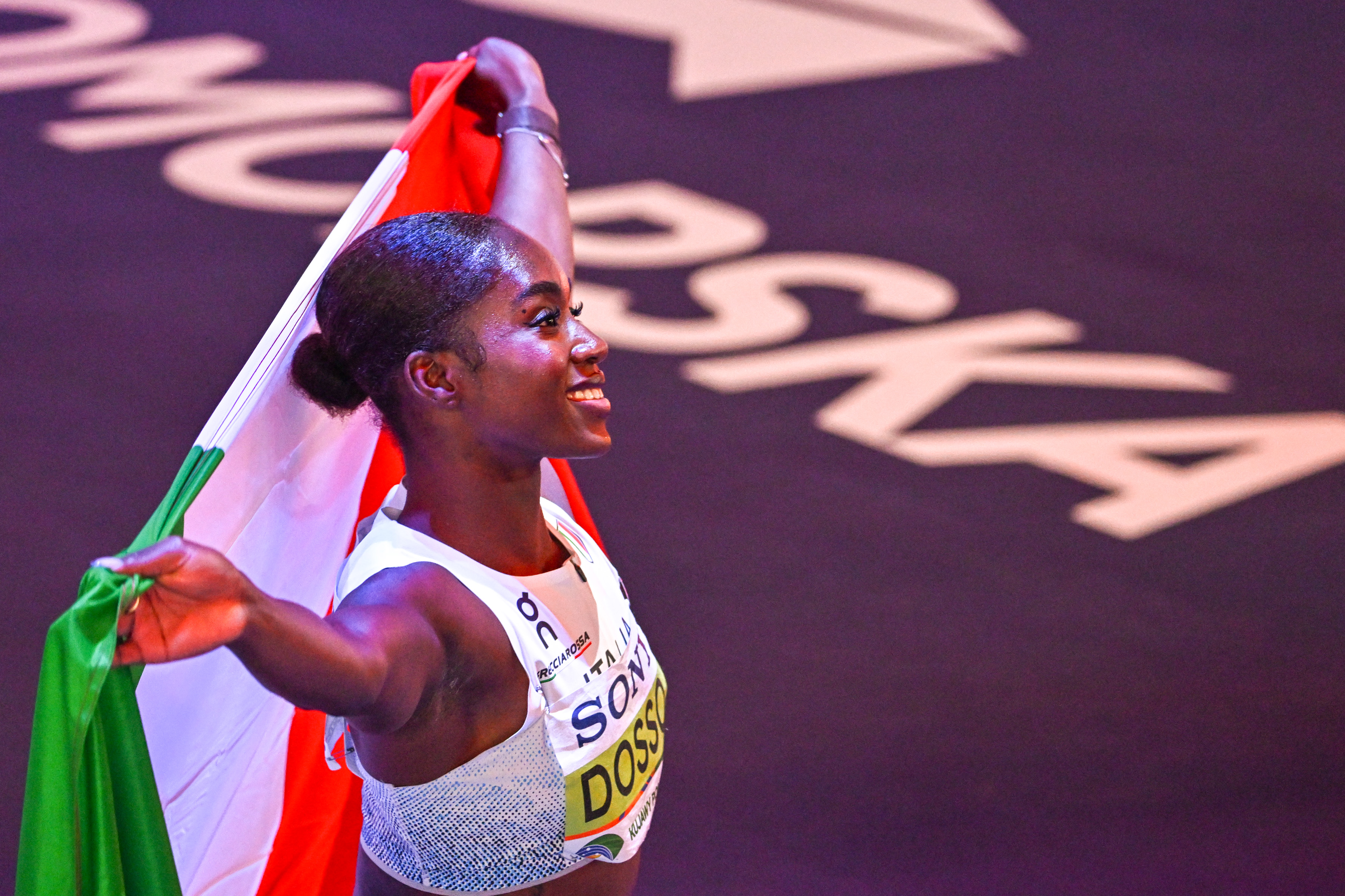
Zaynab Dosso won her 10th national title.

2026 Italian Athletics Indoor Championships was the 57th edition of the Italian Athletics Indoor Championships held in Ancona.

== Most relevant results ==
Francesco Fortunato achieved a world record in the 3000m indoor race walk, Dario Dester set a new Italian Record (NR) in the Heptathlon with 6,121 points, Federico Riva and Ludovica Cavalli both achieved a double victory, winning both the 1500m and 3000m.

== Champions ==
Track events
Event	Men	Performance	Women	Performance
60 m	Filippo Randazzo	6.61	Zaynab Dosso	7.09
400 m	Matteo Raimondi	47.10	Eloisa Coiro	52.02 CR PB
800 m	Giovanni Lazzaro	1:48.87	Laura Pellicoro	2:04.25
1500 m	Federico Riva	3:59.34	Ludovica Cavalli	4:38.22
3000 m	Federico Riva	7:45.25 PB	Ludovica Cavalli	8:51.38
60 m hs	Lorenzo Simonelli	7.60	Elisa Di Lazzaro	8.06
5000/3000 m race walk	Francesco Fortunato	17:54.48 WR	Antonella Palmisano	11:56.74 PB
Field events
High jump	Christian Falocchi	2.30 m PB	Aurora Vicini	1.90 m
Pole vault	Simone Bertelli	5.63 m	Elisa Molinarolo	4.40 m
Long jump	Gabriele Chilà	8.00 m PB	Larissa Iapichino	6.78 m
Triple jump	Andrea Dallavalle	16.99 m	Dariya Derkach	13.90 m
Shot put	Leonardo Fabbri	21.80 m	Sara Verteramo	16.31 m
Combined events
Heptathlon/Pentathlon	Dario Dester	6121 pts NR	Sveva Gerevini	4449 pts
