= List of Italian records in athletics =

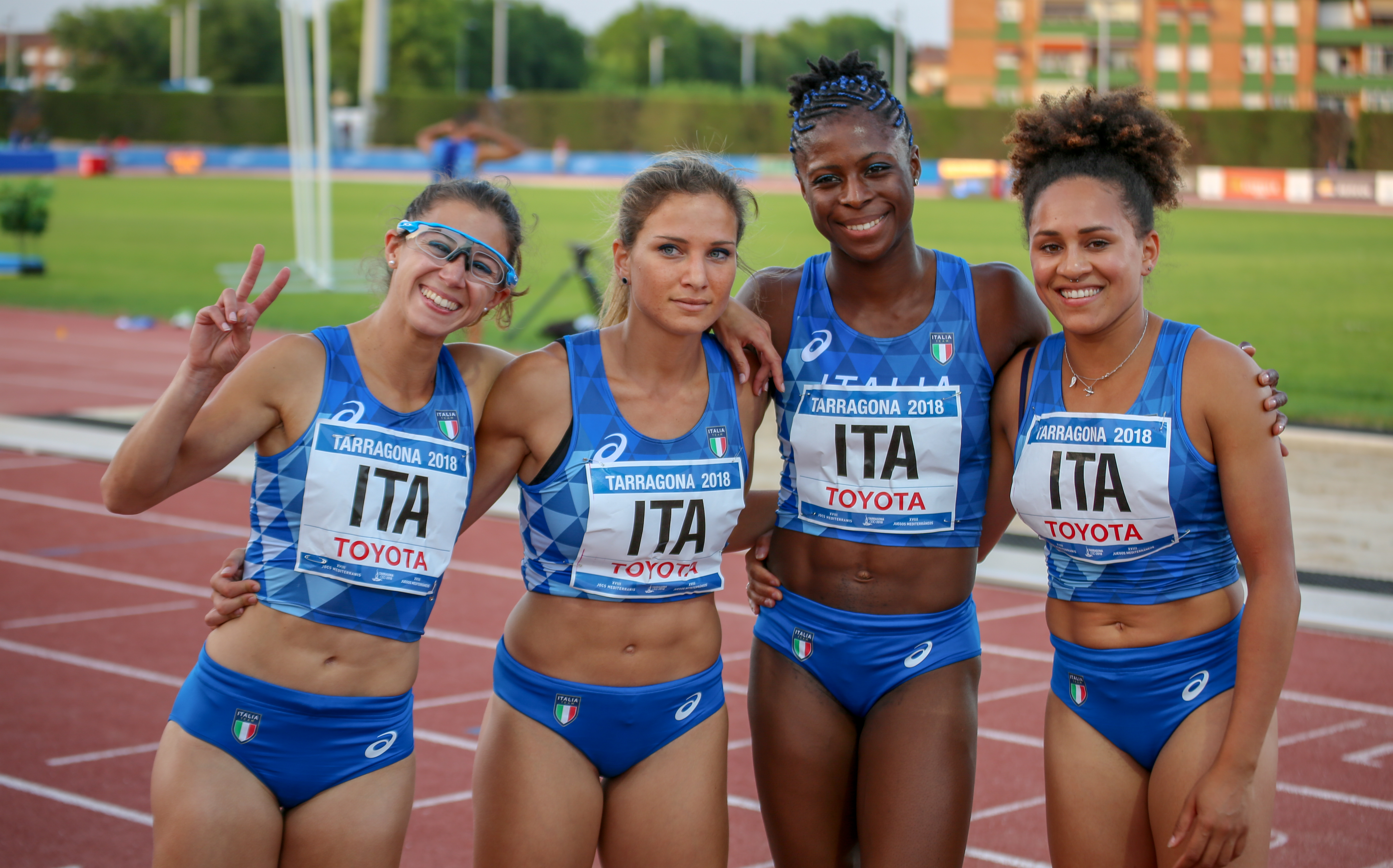
Siragusa, Bongiorni, Hooper, Herrera, the national record holders of the 4 × 100 m relay.

The following are the national records in athletics in Italy maintained by its national athletics federation, Federazione Italiana di Atletica Leggera (FIDAL).

== Outdoor ==
Key to tables: Awaiting ratification Record not kept by FIDAL Not ratified or later rescinded by FIDAL

=== Men ===
==== Olympic events ====
Event	Record	Athlete	Date	Meet	Place	Ref.	Video
100 m	9.80 (+0.1 m/s)	Marcell Jacobs	1 August 2021	Olympic Games	Tokyo, Japan		
200 m	19.72 A (+1.8 m/s)	Pietro Mennea	12 September 1979	Universiade	Mexico City, Mexico		
400 m	44.45	Edoardo Scotti	14 September 2025	World Championships	Tokyo, Japan		
800 m	1:43.7 h	Marcello Fiasconaro	27 June 1973	Notturna di Milano	Milan, Italy		
800 m	1:43.74	Andrea Longo	3 September 2000	IAAF Grand Prix	Rieti, Italy		
800 m	1:43.60	Francesco Pernici	3 July 2026	Meeting Stanislas Nancy	Tomblaine, France		
800 m	1:42.67	Francesco Pernici	13 September 2026	World Ultimate Championship	Budapest, Hungary		
1000 m	2:15.76	Andrea Benvenuti	12 September 1992	Nuoro Meeting Terra Sarda	Nuoro, Italy		
1500 m	3:30.74	Pietro Arese	6 August 2024	Olympic Games	Paris, France		
5000 m	13:02.26	Yemaneberhan Crippa	8 September 2020	Golden Spike Ostrava	Ostrava, Czech Republic		
10,000 m	27:10.76	Yemaneberhan Crippa	6 October 2019	World Championships	Doha, Qatar		
Marathon	2:05:24	Yohanes Chiappinelli	1 December 2024	Valencia Marathon	Valencia, Spain		
Marathon	2:04:26	Iliass Aouani	1 March 2026	Tokyo Marathon	Tokyo, Japan		
110 m hurdles	13.05 (+0.6 m/s)	Lorenzo Simonelli	8 June 2024	European Championships	Rome, Italy		
400 m hurdles	47.50	Alessandro Sibilio	11 June 2024	European Championships	Rome, Italy		
3000 m steeplechase	8:08.57	Francesco Panetta	5 September 1987	World Championships	Rome, Italy		
High jump	2.39 m	Gianmarco Tamberi	15 July 2016	Herculis	Monaco, Monaco		
Pole vault	5.90 m	Giuseppe Gibilisco	28 August 2003	World Championships	Saint-Denis, France		
Long jump	8.47 m (−0.2 m/s)	Andrew Howe	30 August 2007	World Championships	Osaka, Japan		
Triple jump	17.75 m (+0.9 m/s)	Andy Díaz Hernádez (Note: dual citizenship; Cuban by official result source but eligible for Italy)	2 June 2023	Golden Gala	Florence, Italy		
Triple jump	17.87 m (+0.7 m/s)	Andy Díaz Hernádez	25 July 2026	Italian Championships	Florence, Italy		
Triple jump	18.15 m (+1.7 m/s)	Andy Díaz Hernádez	15 August 2026	European Championships	Birmingham, United Kingdom		
Shot put	22.98 m	Leonardo Fabbri	14 September 2024	Memorial Van Damme	Brussels, Belgium		
Discus throw	67.62 m	Marco Martino	28 May 1989		Spoleto, Italy		
Hammer throw	81.64 m	Enrico Sgrulletti	3 March 1997	Stadio delle Tre Fontane	Rome, Italy		
Javelin throw	84.60 m	Carlo Sonego	8 May 1999	IAAF Grand Prix in Osaka	Osaka, Japan		
Decathlon	8235 pts	Dario Dester	10–11 June 2024	European Championships	Rome, Italy (Note: by official result source; Monaco by FIDAL source, a typo)		
Decathlon	100m (wind) / Long jump (wind) / Shot put / High jump / 400m / 110m H (wind) / Discus / Pole vault / Javelin / 1500m; 10.76 (−0.5 m/s) / 7.32 m (+0.4 m/s) / 12.43 m / 2.02 m / 48.43 / 14.28 (+1.3 m/s) / 41.00 m / 4.90 m / 63.66 m / 4:23.36						
Decathlon	8318 pts	Dario Dester	27–28 June 2026	Mehrkampf-Meeting Ratingen	Ratingen, Germany		
Decathlon	100m (wind) / Long jump (wind) / Shot put / High jump / 400m / 110m H (wind) / Discus / Pole vault / Javelin / 1500m; 10.70 (+1.0 m/s) / 7.31 m (−0.3 m/s) / 14.53 m / 1.97 m / 47.54 / 14.16 (+0.6 m/s) / 43.83 m / 4.90 m / 58.80 m / 4:31.51						
20 km walk (road)	1:17:26	Massimo Stano	3 March 2024	Chinese Race Walking Grand Prix	Taicang, China		
Half Marathon walk	1:23:00	Francesco Fortunato	8 May 2026	Poděbrady Walking	Poděbrady, Czech Republic		
50 km walk (road)	3:36:04	Alex Schwazer	11 February 2007		Rosignano Solvay, Italy		
4 × 100 m relay	37.50	National team Lorenzo Patta; Marcell Jacobs; Fausto Desalu; Filippo Tortu	6 August 2021	Olympic Games	Tokyo, Japan		
4 × 400 m relay	2:58.81	National team Davide Re; Vladimir Aceti; Edoardo Scotti; Alessandro Sibilio	7 August 2021	Olympic Games	Tokyo, Japan		
4 × 400 m relay	2:58.10	National team Edoardo Scotti; Luca Sito; Mohamed Soudassi; Lorenzo Benati	14 August 2026	European Championships	Birmingham, United Kingdom		

==== Others ====
Event	Record	Athlete	Date	Meet	Place	Ref.
150 m (bend)	15.07 (+1.3 m/s)	Fausto Desalu	30 April 2022	Athletic Elite Meeting	Milan, Italy	
150 m (bend)	14.8 h	Pietro Mennea	3 September 1979		Cassino, Italy	
300 m	32.01	Matteo Galvan	7 September 2014	Rieti Meeting	Rieti, Italy	
500 m	1:00.08	Donato Sabia	26 May 1984		Busto Arsizio, Italy	
600 m	1:14.41	Andrea Longo	30 August 2000		Rovereto, Italy	
1000 m	2:15.76	Andrea Benvenuti	12 September 1992		Nuoro, Italy	
Mile	3:48.11	Federico Riva	27 July 2025	ISTAF Berlin	Berlin, Germany	
Mile (road)	3:54.0	Standard				
Mile (road)	3:54.37	Pietro Arese	19 September 2026	World Road Running Championships	Copenhagen, Denmark	
2000 m	4:55.0 h	Gennaro Di Napoli	26 May 1991		Turin, Italy	
3000 m	7:37.90	Yemaneberhan Crippa	13 July 2021	British Grand Prix	Gateshead, United Kingdom	
Two miles	8:20.79	Salvatore Antibo	28 May 1987		Turin, Italy	
5 km (road)	13:14	Yemaneberhan Crippa	30 April 2022	Adizero Road to Records	Herzogenaurach, Germany	
10 km (road)	27:08	Yemaneberhan Crippa	27 April 2024	Adizero Road to Records	Herzogenaurach, Germany	
15 km (road)	44:09	Stefano Baldini	16 November 2008		Nijmegen, Netherlands	
15 km (road)	44:09+	Iliass Aouani	1 March 2026	Tokyo Marathon	Tokyo, Japan	
20,000 m	58:43.8 h	Franco Fava	9 April 1977		Rome, Italy	
20 km (road)	58:51+	Iliass Aouani	1 March 2026	Tokyo Marathon	Tokyo, Japan	
One hour	20,483 m	Giuseppe Gerbi	17 April 1982		Rome, Italy	
Half marathon	59:01	Yemaneberhan Crippa	22 February 2026	Coelmo Napoli City Half Marathon	Naples, Italy	
25,000 m	1:16:40.0 h	Giuseppe Gerbi	10 April 1983		Novi Ligure, Italy	
25 km (road)	1:13:21+	Iliass Aouani	1 March 2026	Tokyo Marathon	Tokyo, Japan	
30,000 m	1:33:08.2 h	Massimo Magnani	11 April 1982		Bologna, Italy	
30 km (road)	1:28:02+	Iliass Aouani	1 March 2026	Tokyo Marathon	Tokyo, Japan	
100 km (road)	6:18:24	Mario Ardemagni	11 September 2004		Winschoten, Netherlands	
24 hours (road)	288.438 km	Marco Visintini	18 September 2022	IAU 24 Hour European Championships	Verona, Italy	
200 m hurdles	22.55 ^{[WB]}	Laurent Ottoz	31 May 1995		Milan, Italy	
300 m hurdles	34.83	Mario Lambrughi	13 April 2024	X Athletic Elite Meet	Milan, Italy	
Mile walk (track)	5:44.0 h	Massimo Fizialetti	16 May 1988		Ostia, Italy	
3000 m walk (track)	10:47.11	Giovanni De Benedictis	19 May 1990		San Giovanni Valdarno, Italy	
10,000 m walk (track)	37:58.6 h	Ivano Brugnetti	23 July 2005		Sesto San Giovanni, Italy	
20,000 m walk (track)	1:19:24.1 h	Walter Arena	26 May 1990		Fana, Norway	
2 hours walk (track)	29572 m +	Maurizio Damilano	3 October 1992		Cuneo, Italy	
30,000 m walk (track)	2:01:44.1 h	Maurizio Damilano	3 October 1992		Cuneo, Italy	
35 km walk (road)	2:20:43	Massimo Stano	18 May 2025	European Race Walking Team Championships	Poděbrady, Czech Republic	
Marathon walk (road)	2:56:49	Massimo Stano	15 August 2026	European Championships	Birmingham, United Kingdom	
50,000 m walk (track)	3:58:59.0 h	Graziano Morotti	10 October 1981		Osio Sopra, Italy	
100,000 m walk (track)	9:49:58.0 h	Valerio Casales	7 October 1979		Sacile, Italy	
100 km walk (road)	9:39:23	Roberto Defendenti	29 October 2000		Scanzorosciate, Italy	
4 × 200 m relay	1:21.10	National team Stefano Tilli; Carlo Simionato; Giovanni Bongiorni; Pietro Mennea	29 September 1983		Cagliari, Italy	
Swedish relay	1:49.54	National team Marco Menchini; Giovanni Puggioni; Marco Vaccari; Andrea Nuti	5 June 1992		Sheffield, United Kingdom	
4 × 800 m relay	7:11.3 h	National team Andrea Giocondi; Alberto Barsotti; Giuseppe D'Urso; Andrea Benvenuti; Ryan Compagnone	5 June 1992		Sheffield, United Kingdom	
4 × 1500 m relay	14:59.1 h	National team Carlo Grippo; Gaetano Erba; Fulvio Costa; Vittorio Fontanella	18 September 1979		Bergamo, Italy	
Marathon road relay – Ekiden	2:02:39	Alessandro Lambruschini (14:00); Francesco Bennici (28:49); Gianni Crepaldi (14:25); Renato Gotti (29:27); Giuliano Baccani (14:17); Stefano Mei (21.41)	17 April 1994	IAAF World Road Relay Championships	Litochoro, Greece	

=== Women ===
==== Olympic events ====
Event	Record	Athlete	Date	Meet	Place	Ref.
100 m	11.01 (+2.0 m/s)	Zaynab Dosso	9 June 2024	European Championships	Rome, Italy	
200 m	22.56 (+1.9 m/s)	Libania Grenot	27 May 2016	BAYTAF Classic	Tampa, United States	
400 m	50.30	Libania Grenot	2 July 2009	Mediterranean Games	Pescara, Italy	
800 m	1:57.66	Gabriella Dorio	5 July 1980		Pisa, Italy	
800 m	1:57.56	Eloisa Coiro	11 August 2026	European Championships	Birmingham, United Kingdom	
1500 m	3:58.11	Sintayehu Vissa	8 August 2024	Olympic Games	Paris, France	
1500 m	3:57.54	Nadia Battocletti	30 August 2026	GalAthletics Bellinzona	Bellinzona, Switzerland	
5000 m	14:23.15	Nadia Battocletti	6 June 2025	Golden Gala	Rome, Italy	
10,000 m	30:38.23	Nadia Battocletti	13 September 2025	World Championships	Tokyo, Japan	
Marathon	2:23:14 Wo	Sofiia Yaremchuk	27 April 2025	London Marathon	London, United Kingdom	
100 m hurdles	12.75 (+0.2 m/s)	Luminosa Bogliolo	1 August 2021	Olympic Games	Tokyo, Japan	
100 m hurdles	12.69 (+1.4 m/s)	Giada Carmassi	15 June 2025	BAUHAUS-galan	Stockholm, Sweden	
400 m hurdles	53.89	Ayomide Folorunso	22 August 2023	World Championships	Budapest, Hungary	
3000 m steeplechase	9:27.48	Elena Romagnolo	15 August 2008	Olympic Games	Beijing, China	
High jump	2.03 m	Antonietta Di Martino	24 June 2007	European Cup 1st League	Milan, Italy	
High jump	2.03 m	Antonietta Di Martino	2 September 2007	World Championships	Osaka, Japan	
Pole vault	4.73 m	Roberta Bruni	4 September 2023		Chiari, Italy	
Long jump	7.11 m (+0.8 m/s)	Fiona May	22 August 1998	European Championships	Budapest, Hungary	
Long jump	7.12 m (+1.8 m/s)	Larissa Iapichino	4 July 2026	Prefontaine Classic	Eugene, United States	
Triple jump	15.03 m (+1.9 m/s)	Magdelín Martínez	26 June 2004		Rome, Italy	
Shot put	19.15 m	Chiara Rosa	24 June 2007; 14 June 2009	ISTAF	Milan, Italy; Berlin, Germany	
Discus throw	64.57 m	Daisy Osakue	11 June 2023	Italian Club Championships	Pietrasanta, Italy	
Discus throw	64.68 m	Daisy Osakue	14 June 2026	Meeting National de Castres #2	Castres, France	
Hammer throw	75.77 m	Sara Fantini	18 June 2022	Meeting de Atletismo Madrid	Madrid, Spain	
Javelin throw	65.30 m	Claudia Coslovich	10 June 2000		Ljubljana, Slovenia	
Heptathlon	6379 pts	Sveva Gerevini	7–8 June 2024	European Championships	Rome, Italy	
Heptathlon	100m H (wind) / High jump / Shot put / 200m (wind) / Long jump (wind) / Javelin / 800m; 13.35 (−0.1 m/s) / 1.80 m / 12.37 m / 23.81 (+0.8 m/s) / 6.33 m (−1.1 m/s) / 43.65 m / 2:10.75					
Heptathlon	6413 pts	Sveva Gerevini	30–31 May 2026	Hypo-Meeting	Götzis, Austria	
Heptathlon	100m H (wind) / High jump / Shot put / 200m (wind) / Long jump (wind) / Javelin / 800m; 13.52 (+0.6 m/s) / 1.74 m / 13.48 m / 23.73 (+0.5 m/s) / 6.13 m (+1.4 m/s) / 48.52 m / 2:09.25					
20 km walk (road)	1:26:17	Eleonora Giorgi	17 May 2015	European Race Walking Cup	Murcia, Spain	
50 km walk (road)	4:04:50	Eleonora Giorgi	19 May 2019	European Cup	Alytus, Lithuania	
4 × 100 m relay	42.14	National team Dalia Kaddari; Anna Bongiorni; Alessia Pavese; Zaynab Dosso	25 August 2023	World Championships	Budapest, Hungary	
4 × 400 m relay	3:23.40	National team Ilaria Elvira Accame; Giancarla Trevisan; Anna Polinari; Alice Mangione	12 June 2024	European Championships	Rome, Italy	

==== Others ====
Event	Record	Athlete	Date	Meet	Place	Ref.
150 m	16.92 (+1.5 m/s) (Note: +1.4 m/s by other sources)	Rebecca Borga	6 April 2024		Foligno, Italy	
300 m	36.30	Manuela Levorato	22 August 2000		Viareggio, Italy	
500 m	1:08.26	Libania Grenot	2 May 2009		Latina, Italy	
600 m	1:24.4 h	Patrizia Spuri	29 September 1999		Rieti, Italy	
1000 m	2:33.20	Gabriella Dorio	28 August 1982		Formia, Italy	
Mile	4:23.29	Gabriella Dorio	14 August 1980		Viareggio, Italy	
Mile	4:17.16	Marta Zenoni	19 July 2025	London Athletics Meet	London, United Kingdom	
Mile (road)	4:34.3 h	Giulia Aprile	7 September 2025	Kö Mile	Düsseldorf, Germany	
2000 m	5:32.83	Roberta Brunet	14 September 1996		Turin, Italy	
3000 m	8:35.65	Roberta Brunet	16 August 1997	Herculis	Fontvieille, Monaco	
3000 m	8:26.27	Nadia Battocletti	25 May 2025	Meeting International Mohammed VI d'Athlétisme de Rabat	Rabat, Morocco	
Two miles	9:44.61	Elisa Rea	24 June 1997		Turin, Italy	
5 km (road)	14:45 Wo	Nadia Battocletti	1 October 2023	World Road Running Championships	Riga, Latvia	
5 km (road)	14:32 Mx	Nadia Battocletti	3 May 2025	Tokyo : Speed : Race	Tokyo, Japan	
10 km (road)	31:36 Wo	Nadia Battocletti	10 September 2023		Pescara, Italy	
10 km (road)	31:19 Mx	Nadia Battocletti	5 April 2024	Festival of Running ASICS Speed Race	Paris, France	
10 km (road)	30:08 Mx	Nadia Battocletti	4 April 2026	Urban Trail de Lille	Lille, France	
15 km (road)	48:47	Rosanna Munerotto	13 October 1991		Nieuwegein, Netherlands	
One hour	18084 m	Silvana Cruciata	4 May 1981		Rome, Italy	
20 km (road)	1:07:57+	Sofiia Yaremchuk	3 December 2023	Valencia Marathon	Valencia, Spain	
Half marathon
Half marathon	1:07:46 Mx	Valeria Straneo	26 February 2012	36th Roma-Ostia Half Marathon	Ostia, Italy	
Half marathon	1:08:55 Wo	Valeria Straneo	29 March 2014	World Half Marathon Championships	Copenhagen, Denmark	
25 km (road)	1:25:05+	Sofiia Yaremchuk	3 December 2023	Valencia Marathon	Valencia, Spain	
30 km (road)	1:41:55+	Sofiia Yaremchuk	3 December 2023	Valencia Marathon	Valencia, Spain	
100 km	7:27:50	Federica Moroni	18 February 2024		Porto Recanati, Italy	
24 hours	231.390 km	Monica Casiraghi	13–14 May 2010	IAU 24 hours run World Championships	Brive-la-Gaillarde, France	
200 m hurdles (straight)	26.06 (+0.5 m/s)	Yadisleidy Pedroso	9 May 2015	Manchester City Games	Manchester, Great Britain	
200 m hurdles (bend)	26.47	Monika Niederstätter	31 May 2000		Trento, Italy	
200 m hurdles (bend)	24.8 h (+0.4 m/s)	Yadisleidy Pedroso	6 April 2013		Caserta, Italy	
300 m hurdles	39.00	Marzia Caravelli	25 April 2014		Rome, Italy	
2000 m steeplechase	6:19.20	Giulia Martinelli	11 September 2011		Rieti, Italy	
Decathlon	6599 pts	Sara Tani	21–22 October 2006		Udine, Italy	
Decathlon	100m (wind) / Discus / Pole vault / Javelin / 400m / 100m H (wind) / Long jump (wind) / Shot put / High jump / 1500m; 13.50 / 26.34 m / 3.30 m / 37.38 m / 1:02.18 / 15.32 / 5.42 m / 12.27 m / 1.66 m / 5:28.26					
Mile walk (track)	6:40.76 A	Ileana Salvador	12 August 1989		Sestriere, Italy	
3000 m walk (track)	11:48.24 ^{[WB]}	Ileana Salvador	29 August 1993		Padua, Italy	
5000 m walk (track)	20:01.80 ^{[WB]}	Eleonora Giorgi	18 May 2014	Italian Clubs League Meet	Misterbianco, Italy	
10,000 m walk (track)	41:57.29	Antonella Palmisano	23 April 2017		Orvieto, Italy	
10 km walk (road)	41:28	Antonella Palmisano	18 October 2020	Italian Championships	Modena, Italy	
Hour walk (track)	13240 m	Rossella Giordano	4 August 2004		Saluzzo, Italy	
15 km walk (road)	1:05:11+	Eleonora Giorgi	21 March 2015	Dudinska Patdesiatka	Dudince, Slovakia	
20,000 m walk (track)	1:30:48.3	Rossella Giordano	4 August 2000		Almada, Portugal	
30,000 m walk (track)	2:56:36.0 h	Cinzia Ghianda	18 October 1986		Limbiate, Italy	
35 km walk (road)	2:41:54	Eleonora Giorgi	22 February 2025		Aksu, Turkey	
35 km walk (road)	2:39:35	Antonella Palmisano	18 May 2025	European Race Walking Team Championships	Poděbrady, Czech Republic	
Marathon walk (road)	3:15:11	Sofia Fiorini	15 August 2026	European Championships	Birmingham, United Kingdom	
4 × 200 m relay	1:35.52	National team Marinella Signori; Francesca Carbone; Marisa Masullo; Rossella Tarolo	27 May 1989		Brescia, Italy	
Swedish relay	2:06.45	Italy; Alice Pagliarini; Elisa Marcello; Valentina Vaccari; Elisa Valensin	29 July 2023	European Youth Olympic Festival	Maribor, Slovenia	
4 × 800 m relay	8:19.3 h	National team Nadia Falvo; Stefania Savi; Nicoletta Tozzi; Fabia Trabaldo	5 June 1992		Sheffield, United Kingdom	

=== Mixed ===
Event	Record	Athlete	Date	Meet	Place	Ref.
4 × 100 m relay	41.04	Italy; Filippo Randazzo; Alessia Pavese; Lorenzo Ianes; Gloria Hooper	28 June 2026	Meeting de Paris	Paris, France	
4 × 400 m relay	3:09.66	Italy; Edoardo Scotti; Virginia Troiani; Vladimir Aceti; Alice Mangione	29 June 2025	European Team Championships	Madrid, Spain	

== Indoor ==
=== Men ===
Event	Record	Athlete	Date	Meet	Place	Ref.	Video
50 m	5.78	Andrea Rabino	28 February 2004	Meeting Pas de Calais	Liévin, France		
50 m	5.76+	Michael Tumi	14 February 2012	Meeting Pas de Calais	Liévin, France		
55 m	6.29	Stefano Teglielli	5 February 2003		Florence, Italy		
60 m	6.41	Marcell Jacobs	19 March 2022	World Championships	Belgrade, Serbia		
100 m	10.33	Simone Collio	13 February 2003		Tampere, Finland		
200 m	20.52	Stefano Tilli	21 February 1985		Turin, Italy		
400 m	45.99	Ashraf Saber	1 March 1998	European Championships	Valencia, Spain		
500 m	1:02.8+ h	Donato Sabia	4 February 1984		Genoa, Italy		
600 m	1:15.77	Donato Sabia	4 February 1984		Genoa, Italy		
800 m	1:45.00	Catalin Tecuceanu	23 February 2024	Villa de Madrid Indoor Meeting	Madrid, Spain		
1000 m	2:18.58	Christian Obrist	21 February 2008	GE Galan	Stockholm, Sweden		
1500 m	3:35.63	Ossama Meslek	6 February 2024	Copernicus Cup	Toruń, Poland		
1500 m	3:33.94	Federico Riva	8 February 2026	Indoor Meeting Karlsruhe	Karlsruhe, Germany		
1500 m	3:33.04	Federico Riva	19 February 2026	Meeting Hauts-de-France Pas-de-Calais	Liévin, France		
Mile	3:54.64	Pietro Arese	31 January 2026	Campionato Regionale Prove Multiple	Padua, Italy		
2000 m	5:02.67	Federico Riva	10 February 2024	Meeting Hauts-de-France Pas-de-Calais	Liévin, France		
3000 m	7:38.42	Pietro Arese	3 February 2024	Meeting Metz Moselle Athlélor	Metz, France		
5000 m	13:23.99	Yemaneberhan Crippa	18 February 2017	Birmingham Indoor Grand Prix	Birmingham, United Kingdom		
50 m hurdles	6.64	Emiliano Pizzoli	5 February 1999		Budapest, Hungary		
50 m hurdles	6.62+	Emanuele Abate	14 February 2012	Meeting Pas de Calais	Liévin, France		
60 m hurdles	7.43	Lorenzo Simonelli	2 March 2024	World Championships	Glasgow, United Kingdom		
High jump	2.38 m	Gianmarco Tamberi	13 February 2016		Hustopeče, Czech Republic		
Pole vault	5.82 m	Giuseppe Gibilisco	15 February 2004	Pole Vault Stars	Donetsk, Ukraine		
Pole vault	5.82 m	Claudio Stecchi	15 February 2023	Meeting Hauts-de-France Pas-de-Calais	Liévin, France		
Long jump	8.39 m (Note: indoor best; outdoor mark ratified as absolute record)	Mattia Furlani	8 February 2026	Meeting Metz Moselle Athlélor Crédit Mutuel	Metz, France		
Long jump	8.39 m	Mattia Furlani	22 March 2026	World Championships	Toruń, Poland		
Triple jump	17.80 m	Andy Díaz	21 March 2025	World Championships	Nanjing, China		
Shot put	22.37 m	Leonardo Fabbri	10 February 2024	Meeting Hauts-de-France Pas-de-Calais	Liévin, France		
Weight throw	20.86 m	Gianlorenzo Ferretti	24 January 2015	Wisconsin vs. Minnesota Dual	Madison, United States		
Heptathlon	6121 pts	Dario Dester	28 February−1 March 2026	Italian Championships	Ancona, Italy		
Heptathlon	60m / Long jump / Shot put / High jump / 60m H / Pole vault / 1000m; 6.91 / 7.48 m / 14.86 m / 1.98 m / 7.96 / 4.70 m / 2:37.69						
5000 m walk	17:54.48	Francesco Fortunato	28 February 2026	Italian Championships	Ancona, Italy		
4 × 200 m relay	1:22.32	Italy; Pierfrancesco Pavoni; Stefano Tilli; Giovanni Bongiorni; Carlo Simionato	11 February 1984		Turin, Italy		
4 × 400 m relay	3:05.51	Italy; Marco Vaccari; Vito Petrella; Alessandro Aimar; Andrea Nuti	10 March 1991	World Championships	Seville, Spain		

=== Women ===
Event	Record	Athlete	Date	Meet	Place	Ref.	Video
50 m	6.31	Marisa Masullo	22 February 1981		Grenoble, France		
50 m	6.09+	Zaynab Dosso	3 February 2026	Czech Indoor Gala	Ostrava, Czech Republic		
55 m	6.83	Manuela Levorato	9 February 2002		Florence, Italy		
60 m	7.02	Zaynab Dosso	6 February 2024	Copernicus Cup	Toruń, Poland		
60 m	7.01	Zaynab Dosso	9 March 2025	European Championships	Apeldoorn, Netherlands		
60 m	6.99	Zaynab Dosso	22 February 2026	Copernicus Cup	Toruń, Poland		
200 m	23.14	Manuela Levorato	2 March 2003		Genoa, Italy		
400 m	52.17	Virna De Angeli	10 March 1996	European Championships	Stockholm, Sweden		
400 m	51.75	Alice Mangione	7 February 2025	INIT Indoor Meeting Karlsruhe	Karlsruhe, Germany		
500 m	1:10.69	Giancarla Trevisan	10 February 2024 (Note: by World Athletics source; 1 February 2024 by FIDAL source, a typo)	10th Darius Dixon Memorial Invitational	Lynchburg, United States		
800 m	1:59.25	Elisa Cusma	15 February 2009	BW-Bank Meeting	Karlsruhe, Germany		
1000 m	2:37.09	Elena Bello	25 February 2023	Birmingham Indoor Grand Prix	Birmingham, United Kingdom		
1500 m	4:04.01	Gabriella Dorio	7 March 1982		Milan, Italy		
Mile	4:24.54	Sintayehu Vissa	11 February 2023	Millrose Games	New York City, United States		
Mile	4:21.51	Sintayehu Vissa	2 March 2025	BU Last Chance	Boston, United States		
2000 m	5:42.43	Marta Zenoni	19 February 2026	Meeting Hauts-de-France Pas-de-Calais	Liévin, France		
3000 m	8:41.72	Nadia Battocletti	14 February 2022	Meeting de l'Eure	Val-de-Reuil, France		
3000 m	8:26.44	Nadia Battocletti	19 February 2026	Meeting Hauts-de-France Pas-de-Calais	Liévin, France		
5000 m	16:00.45	Valentina Gemetto	24 January 2026	Meeting de Lyon	Lyon, France		
50 m hurdles	7.17	Desola Oki	23 December 2017		Parma, Italy		
50 m hurdles	7.04+	Marzia Caravelli	14 February 2012	Meeting Pas de Calais	Liévin, France		
50 m hurdles	7.00+	Giada Carmassi	13 February 2025	Meeting Hauts-de-France Pas-de-Calais	Liévin, France		
60 m hurdles	7.94 (Note: by official result source (final); 7.96 by FIDAL source, (time was set at semi-final)	Veronica Borsi	1 March 2013	European Championships	Gothenburg, Sweden		
High jump	2.04 m (Note: outdoor mark ratified as absolute record)	Antonietta Di Martino	9 February 2011	Banská Bystrica Europa SC High Jump Meeting	Banská Bystrica, Slovakia		
Pole vault	4.66 m	Elisa Molinarolo	17 February 2024	Italian Championships	Ancona, Italy		
Long jump	6.97 m	Larissa Iapichino	5 March 2023	European Championships	Istanbul, Turkey		
Triple jump	14.81 m	Magdelín Martínez	5 March 2004	World Championships	Budapest, Hungary		
Shot put	19.20 m	Assunta Legnante	16 February 2002		Genoa, Italy		
Weight throw	20.35 m	Nadia Maffo	10 February 2018	Vanderbilt's Music City Challenge	Nashville, United States		
Pentathlon	4559 pts	Sveva Gerevini	1 March 2024	World Championships	Glasgow, United Kingdom		
Pentathlon	60m H / High jump / Shot put / Long jump / 800m; 8.28 / 1.76 m / 12.58 m / 6.26 m / 2:12.07						
Mile walk (track)	6:28.46	Giuliana Salce	16 February 1985		Genoa, Italy		
3000 m walk	11:50.08	Eleonora Giorgi	22 February 2014	Italian Championships	Ancona, Italy		
Two miles walk	13:11.88 ^{[WB]}	Ileana Salvador	14 February 1990		Genoa, Italy		
4 × 200 m relay	1:34.05	Italy; Laura Miano; Daniela Ferrian; Erica Rossi; Marisa Masullo	11 February 1984		Turin, Italy		
4 × 400 m relay	3:28.61	Italy; Alice Mangione; Ayomide Folorunso; Anna Polinari; Eleonora Marchiando	5 March 2023	European Championships	Istanbul, Turkey		
4 × 800 m relay	9:24.5	Sisport Fiat Also					

== See also ==
- Athletics in Italy
- List of Italian records in masters athletics
- Women's long jump Italian record progression
- Women's high jump Italian record progression
- Men's high jump Italian record progression
