= 2005 Italian Athletics Indoor Championships =

- Dates: 19–20 February
- Host city: Ancona
- Venue: Palaindoor di Ancona
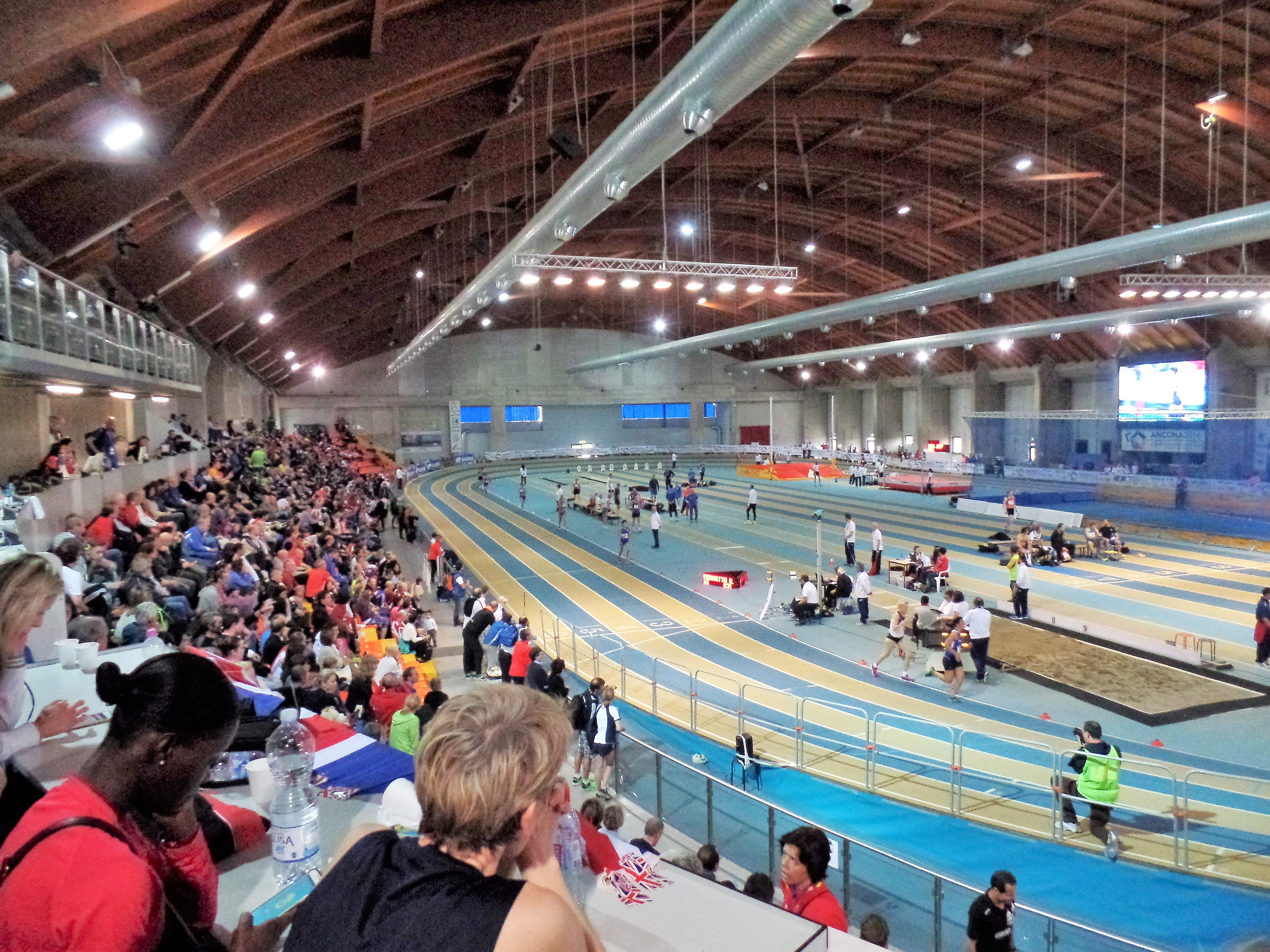
- Level: Senior
- Events: 28 + relays

2006 Italian Athletics Indoor Championships was the 36th edition of the Italian Athletics Indoor Championships and were held in Ancona for the first time.

== Champions ==
=== Men ===
Event	Winner	Performance
60 m	Simone Collio	6.63
200 m	Massimiliano Donati	21.31
400 m	Edoardo Vallet	47.94
800 m	Maurizio Bobbato	1:49.56
1500 m	Andrea Longo	3:41.79
3000 m	Cosimo Caliandro	7:58.94
60 m hs	Andrea Giaconi	7.77
High jump	Nicola Ciotti	2.28
Pole vault	Giorgio Piantella	5.30
Long jump	Milko Campus	7.70
Triple jump	Salvatore Morello	16.65
Shot put	Marco Dodoni	19.72
Heptathlon	Marzio Viti	5599
5000 m walk	Alessandro Gandellini	19:03.38
Relay	C.S. Carabinieri	

=== Women ===
Event	Winner	Performance
60 m	Daniela Graglia	7.42
200 m	Daniela Graglia	24.15
400 m	Monika Niederstätter	54.66
800 m	Elisabetta Artuso	2:04.78
1500 m	Sara Palmas	4:17.83
3000 m	Silvia Weissteiner	9:07.11
60 m hs	Margaret Macchiut	8.14
High jump	Anna Visigalli	1.88
Pole vault	Sara Bruzzese	3.95
Long jump	Laura Gatto	6.33
Triple jump	Magdelín Martínez	14.52
Shot put	Assunta Legnante	17.96
Pentathlon	Silvia Dalla Piana	4009
3000 m walk	Elisa Rigaudo	12:09.57

== See also ==
- 2006 Italian Athletics Championships
