= 2007 Italian Athletics Indoor Championships =

- Dates: 17–18 February
- Host city: Ancona
- Venue: Palaindoor di Ancona
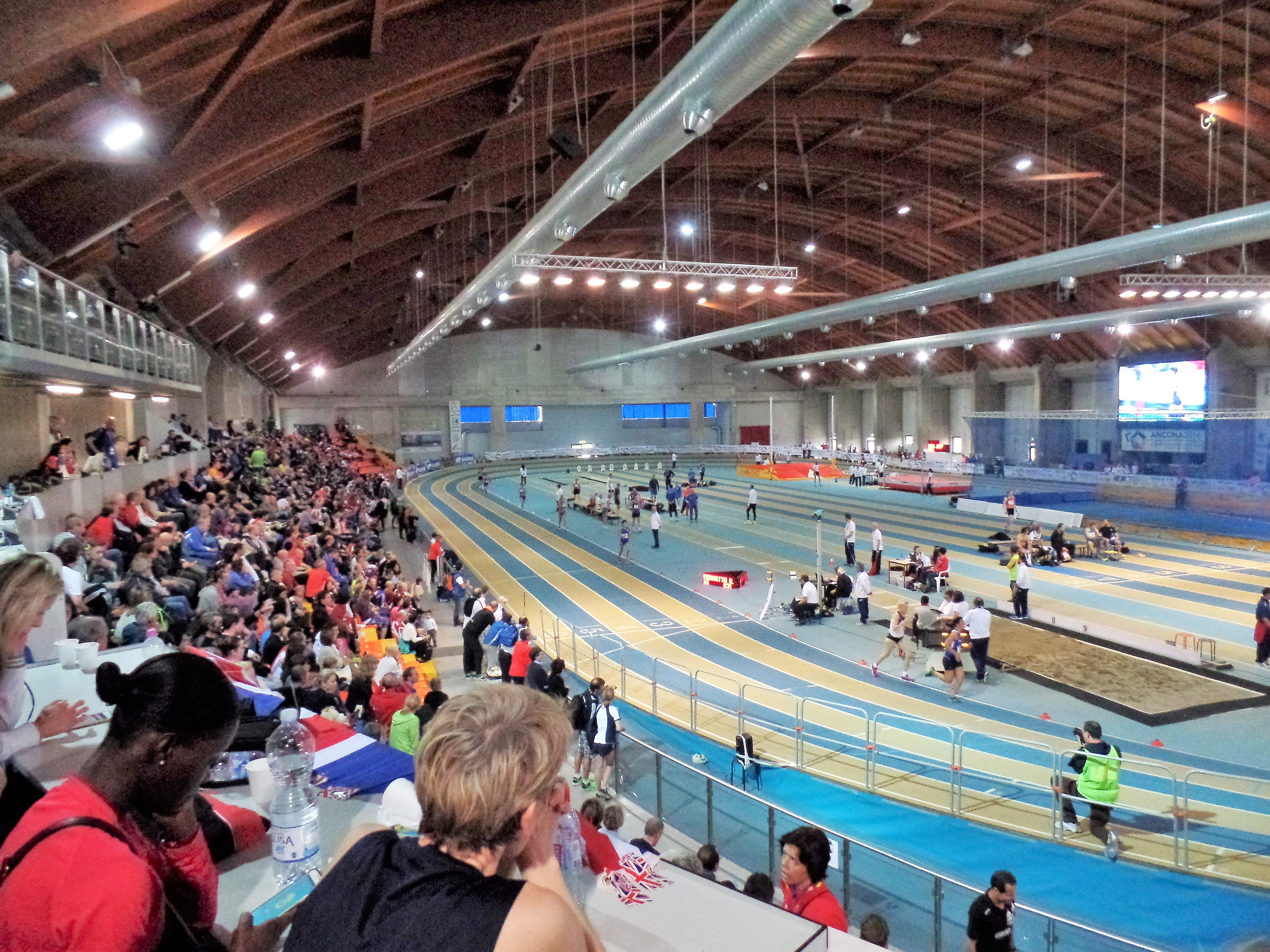
- Level: Senior
- Events: 26 (13 men, 13 women) + relays

2007 Italian Athletics Indoor Championships was the 38th edition of the Italian Athletics Indoor Championships and were held in Ancona.

== Champions ==
=== Men ===
Event	Winner	Performance
60 m	Massimiliano Donati	6.62
400 m	Andrea Barberi	46.78
800 m	Maurizio Bobbato	1:51.90
1500 m	Maurizio Bobbato	3:47.38
3000 m	Najibe Salami	8:06.34
60 m hs	Emiliano Pizzoli	7.88
High jump	Andrea Bettinelli	2.29
Pole vault	Giorgio Piantella	5.50
Long jump	Andrew Howe	8.15
Triple jump	Fabrizio Donato	16.93
Shot put	Marco Di Maggio	19.20
Heptathlon	Luca Ceglie	5711
5000 m walk	Ivano Brugnetti	18:08.86
Relay	C.S. Aeronautica	

=== Women ===
Event	Winner	Performance
60 m	Daniela Graglia	7.31
400 m	Daniela Reina	53.11
800 m	Elisa Cusma	2:04.39
1500 m	Sara Palmas	4:20.50
3000 m	Silvia Weissteiner	8:58.93
60 m hs	Micol Cattaneo	8.27
High jump	Antonietta Di Martino	1.93
Pole vault	Elena Scarpellini	4.15
Long jump	Valeria Canella	6.48
Triple jump	Francesca Carlotto	13.40
Shot put	Assunta Legnante	18.65
Pentathlon	Cecilia Ricali	4194
3000 m walk	Elisa Rigaudo	12:14.72

== See also ==
- 2007 Italian Athletics Championships
