= 1973 Italian Athletics Indoor Championships =

- Dates: 20–21 February
- Host city: Genoa
- Venue: Palasport di Genova
- Level: Senior
- Events: 22 (13 men, 9 women) + relays

1973 Italian Athletics Indoor Championships was the 4th edition of the Italian Athletics Indoor Championships and were held in Genoa.

== Champions ==
Men
Event	Winner	Performance
60 m	Vincenzo Guerini	6.6
400 m	Pasqualino Abeti	48.2
800 m	Vittorio Fontanella	1:54.1
1500 m	Adelio Diamante	3:48.8
3000 m	Gianni Del Buono	7:58.2
60 m hs	Giuseppe Buttari	7.8
High jump	Enzo Del Forno	2.13
Pole vault	Renato Dionisi	5.00
Long jump	Carlo Arrighi	7.47
Triple jump	Ezio Buzzelli	15.48
Shot put	Marco Montelatici	17.36
Heptathlon	Gianni Modena	3765
5000 m walk	Vittorio Visini	12:26.8
Relay	Fiat Torino	

Women
Event	Winner	Performance
60 m	Cecilia Molinari	7.4
400 m	Donata Govoni	56.4
800 m	Zina Boniolo	2:14.8
1500 m	Giuseppina Torello	4:29.9
60 m hs	Antonella Battaglia	8.7
High jump	Sara Simeoni	1.81
Long jump	Silvia Chersoni	5.94
Shot put	Cinzia Petrucci	15.56
Pentathlon	Tosca Degl'Innocenti	3724

== See also ==
- 1973 Italian Athletics Championships
