= 1971 Italian Athletics Indoor Championships =

- Dates: 23–24 March
- Host city: Genoa
- Venue: Palasport di Genova
- Level: Senior
- Events: 21 (13 men, 8 women) + relays

1971 Italian Athletics Indoor Championships was the 2nd edition of the Italian Athletics Indoor Championships and were held in Genoa.

== Champions ==
Men
Event	Winner	Performance
60 m	Vincenzo Guerini	6.9
200 m	Umberto Tedeschi	22.0
400 m	Bruno Bianchi	49.5
800 m	Dario Bonetti	1:58.2
1500 m	Gianni Del Buono	3:41.9
3000 m	Giuseppe Cindolo	7:59.4
60 m hs	Sergio Liani	8.0
High jump	Erminio Azzaro	2.14
Pole vault	Renato Dionisi	5.00
Long jump	Carlo Arrighi	7.36
Triple jump	Ezio Buzzelli	15.38
Shot put	Renato Bergonzoni	17.62
5000 m walk	Vittorio Visini	8:07.0
Relay	Giglio Rosso Firenze	

Women
Event	Winner	Performance
60 m	Cecilia Molinari	7.7
200 m	Alessandra Orselli	25.4
400 m	Silvia Chersoni	56.8
800 m	Donata Govoni	2:09.2
60 m hs	Ileana Ongar	8.9
High jump	Sara Simeoni	1.68
Long jump	Laura De Blasis	5.68
Shot put	Silvana Forcellini	13.94

== See also ==
- 1971 Italian Athletics Championships
