= 1972 Italian Athletics Indoor Championships =

- Dates: 22–23 February
- Host city: Genoa
- Venue: Palasport di Genova
- Level: Senior
- Events: 20 (12 men, 8 women) + relays

1972 Italian Athletics Indoor Championships was the 3rd edition of the Italian Athletics Indoor Championships and were held in Genoa.

== Champions ==
Men
Event	Winner	Performance
60 m	Vittorio Roscio	6.7
400 m	Marcello Fiasconaro	46.4
800 m	Claudio Baratto	1:53.5
1500 m	Franco Arese	3:46.6
3000 m	Gianni Del Buono	8:01.8
60 m hs	Marco Acerbi	8.0
High jump	Gian Marco Schivo	2.14
Pole vault	Silvio Fraquelli	4.80
Long jump	Alberto Albero	7.52
Triple jump	Ezio Buzzelli	15.37
Shot put	Renato Bergonzoni	17.78
5000 m walk	Vittorio Visini	12:40.4
Relay	Cus Torino	

Women
Event	Winner	Performance
60 m	Cecilia Molinari	7.3
400 m	Alessandra Orselli	56.3
800 m	Donata Govoni	2:09.7
1500 m	Giuseppina Torello	4:42.2
60 m hs	Ileana Ongar	8.7
High jump	Isabella Pigato	1.68
Long jump	Manuela Martinelli	5.68
Shot put	Maria Stella Masocco	14.98

== See also ==
- 1972 Italian Athletics Championships
