= 2009 Italian Athletics Indoor Championships =

- Dates: 21–22 February
- Host city: Turin
- Venue: Oval Lingotto
- Level: Senior
- Events: 22 (13 men, 9 women) + relays

2009 Italian Athletics Indoor Championships was the 40th edition of the Italian Athletics Indoor Championships and were held in Turin.

== Champions ==
Men
Event	Winner	Performance
60 m	Simone Collio	6.63
400 m	Claudio Licciardello	46.03
800 m	Lukas Rifesser	1:52.51
1500 m	Christian Obrist	3:41.03
3000 m	Daniele Meucci	8:03.48
60 m hs	Emanuele Abate	7.83
High jump	Nicola Ciotti	2.27
Pole vault	Giorgio Piantella	5.50
Long jump	Stefano Tremigliozzi	7.86
Triple jump	Fabrizio Donato	17.42
Shot put	Paolo Dal Soglio	19.20
Heptathlon	William Frullani	5950
5000 m walk	Ivano Brugnetti	18:23.47
Relay	Atletica Riccardi	

Women
Event	Winner	Performance
60 m	Anita Pistone	7.33
400 m	Daniela Reina	53.19
800 m	Elisa Cusma	2:04.83
1500 m	Elisa Cusma	4:19.16
3000 m	Elena Romagnolo	8:54.14
60 m hs	Micol Cattaneo	8.28
High jump	Antonietta Di Martino	1.96
Pole vault	Anna Giordano Bruno	4.20
Long jump	Tania Vicenzino	6.53
Triple jump	Magdelín Martínez	14.28
Shot put	Assunta Legnante	18.85
Pentathlon	Francesca Doveri	4423
3000 m walk	Elisa Rigaudo	12:40.75

== See also ==
- 2009 Italian Athletics Championships
