= 1970 Italian Athletics Indoor Championships =

- Dates: 21–22 March
- Host city: Genoa
- Venue: Palasport di Genova
- Level: Senior
- Events: 19 (12 men, 7 women) + relays

1970 Italian Athletics Indoor Championships was the 1st edition of the Italian Athletics Indoor Championships and were held in Genoa.

== Champions ==
=== Men ===
Event	Winner	Performance
60 m	Pasqualino Abeti	6.7
400 m	Bruno Bianchi	49.0
800 m	Dario Bonetti	1:51.8
1500 m	Roberto Gervasini	3:50.2
3000 m	Franco Arese	8:02.0
60 m hs	Sergio Liani	7.9
High jump	Erminio Azzaro	2.11
Pole vault	Edoardo Righi	4.70
Long jump	Elio Lazzarotti	7.51
Triple jump	Norberto Capiferri	15.41
Shot put	Renato Bergonzoni	17.08
Race walk 2 km	Vittorio Visini	8:02.8
Relay 200 m×1-2-3	Lilion Snia Milano (Preatoni, Fusi, Trachelio)	2:28.2

=== Women ===
Event	Winner	Performance
60 m	Cecilia Molinari	7.5
400 m	Donata Govoni	56.4
800 m	Angela Ramello	2:16.4
60 m hs	Paola Giuli	8.9
High jump	Sara Simeoni	1.64
Long jump	Annamaria Lugoboni	5.70
Shot put	Silvana Forcellini	13.79
Relay 200 m×1-2-3	Snia Libertas Torino (Di Meglio, Salasso, Lovisolo)	3:06.9.

== See also ==
- 1970 Italian Athletics Championships
