= 1986 Italian Athletics Indoor Championships =

- Dates: 5–6 February
- Host city: Genoa
- Venue: Palasport di Genova
- Level: Senior
- Events: 23

1986 Italian Athletics Indoor Championships was the 17th edition of the Italian Athletics Indoor Championships and were held in Genoa.

== Results ==
=== Men ===
Event	CHAMPION	Performance	SILVER	Performance	BRONZE	Performance
Run events
60 m	Antonio Ullo; Gruppi Sportivi Fiamme Gialle	6"69	Pierfrancesco Pavoni; Gruppi Sportivi Fiamme Gialle	6"77	Franco Zucchini; Gruppo Sportivo Fiamme Oro	6"80
200 m	Giovanni Bongiorni; Pro Patria Freedent MI	21"48	Marco De Pasquale; Gruppo Sportivo Fiamme Oro	21"60	Andrea Mancini; CUS Roma	22"04
400 m	Leonardo Poli; ASSI Banca Toscana	47"75	Alessandro Pinna; Esperia Cagliari	47"79	Oddone Campana; Gruppo Sportivo Fiamme Oro	48"17
800 m	Tonino Viali; Gruppo Sportivo Fiamme Oro	1'50"32	Stefano Cecchini; Gruppi Sportivi Fiamme Gialle	1'50"93	Claudio Castanini; CUS Genova	1'52"25
1500 m	Claudio Patrignani; Pro Patria Freedent Milano	3'44"95	Walter Merlo; CUS Torino	3'45"59	Alessandro Lambruschini; Gruppo Sportivo Fiamme Oro	3'45"78
3000 m	Stefano Mei; Gruppo Sportivo Fiamme Oro	8'03"44	Tonino Felici; Gruppo Sportivo Fiamme Oro	8'07"92	Ernesto Del Sarto; Atletica Massa	8'17"24
60 m hs	Luigi Bertocchi; Gruppi Sportivi Fiamme Gialle	7"89	Fausto Frigerio; Gruppo Sportivo Fiamme Azzurre	8"03	Raffaele Torre; Atletica Riccardi	8"04
Race wal 5000 m	Carlo Mattioli; Centro Sportivo Carabinieri	19'34"87	Giacomo Poggi; ASSI Banca Toscana	19'47"59	Giancarlo Gandossi; Centro Sportivo Carabinieri	20'29"38
Field events
High jump	Gianni Davito; CUS Torino	2,23 m	Gian Piero Palomba; CUS Genova	2,20 m	Maurizio Milani; CUS Torino	2,20 m
Pole vault	Marco Andreini; Gruppi Sportivi Fiamme Gialle	5,40 m	Gianni Stecchi; ASSI Banca Toscana	5,20 m	Corrado Alagona; Gruppo Sportivo Fiamme Oro	5,10 m
Long jump	Claudio Cherubini; CUS Roma	7,69 m	Fabrizio Secchi; CUS Torino	7,58 m	Renato Furlani; Gruppo Sportivo Fiamme Oro	7,42 m
Triple jump	Roberto Mazzucato; Gruppi Sportivi Fiamme Gialle	16,01 m	Nicola Parigi; Atletica Livorno	15,80 m	Gianni Cecconi; Gruppo Sportivo Fiamme Oro	15,69 m
Shot put	Marco Montelatici; Pro Patria Freedent Milano	20,65 m	Fernando Baroni; Gruppi Sportivi Fiamme Gialle	19,13 m	Marco Giacomini; Gruppo Sportivo Fiamme Azzurre	17,21 m

=== Women ===
Event	CHAMPION	Performance	SILVER	Performance	BRONZE	Performance
Run events
60 m	Daniela Ferrian; SNIA BPD Milano	7"42	Gisella Trombin; CUS Pavia	7"62	Santini; Casa dello Sport Grosseto	7"64
200 m	Rossella Tarolo; SNIA BPD Milano	24"43	Roberta Rabaioli; Società Sportiva Snam	24"97	Cristina Picchi; Atletica Empoli	25"02
400 m	Erica Rossi; Fiat ALSO Torino	53"89	Cosetta Campana; Fiat ALSO Torino	55"67	Cristina Corvatta; Atletica AVIS Macerata	56"03
800 m	Patrizia Gini; CUS Roma	2'12"63	Irmgard Trojer; SSV Brunico	2'13"44	Ornella Benetti; Fiamma Vicenza	2'14"17
1500 m	Agnese Possamai; Fiamma Dolomiti Belluno	4'23"77	Alessandra Corti; Società Sportiva Snam	4'32"20	Tullia Mancia; Cises Frascati	4'35"45
60 m hs	Mary Massarin; Fiat ALSO Torino	8"44	Antonella Bellutti; N.A. Alto Adige	8"47	Laura Rosati; ACSI Pro Sport Cassino	8"56
Race walk 3000 m	Giuliana Salce	12'48"96	?		?	
Field events
High jump	Sara Simeoni; Atletica 2.01 Rivoli	1,92 m	Alessandra Fossati; Fiat ALSO Torino	1,90 m	Barbara Fiammengo; A.F. Primavera Torino	1,81 m
Long jump	Alessandra Becatti; ASSI Banca Toscana	6,32 m	Antonella Capriotti; CUS Roma	6,29 m	Valentina Uccheddu; Atletica Oristano	6,17 m
Shot put	Agnese Maffeis; SNIA BPD Milano	15,56 m	Mara Rosolen; Società Sportiva Snam	14,79 m	Wilma Rigamonti; ACSI Pro Sport Cassino	13,97 m
