= Pinacoteca Comunale, Piazza Armerina =

Civic art gallery of Piazza Armerina, Italy

Coordinates: 37°23′03″N 14°21′47″E

The Pinacoteca Comunale of Piazza Armerina is the civic art gallery of the town of Piazza Armerina, province of Enna, region of Sicily, Italy.

== History and description ==
Many of the works from prior to the mid-18th century, came into the possession of the comune (municipality) after the suppression of religious institutions, mainly monasteries in the 1880s. They were displayed in various locations, until 2002 when it was decided to move them to the present location in the north wing of the mid-15th-century, former Benedictine convent of the Trinità. Refurbishment of the facility was completed by 2011. The museum also has a collection of portraits by and of local citizens.

In the vestibule is a 16th-century statue of St Agata, from the portal of the former church of the same name. There is a fresco moved here from the church of Santa Maria di Gesù, depicting an Enthroned Madonna and Child and a bust of Dante Alighieri by Francesco Messina (1840 - 1914).

In the first room (Sala Rossa) is a 15th-century detached fresco attributed to the Master of the Polyptych of San Martino in Siracusa once belonging to the former Franciscan church of Santa Maria di Gesù. An altarpiece likely from the former church of Santa Chiara, depicts Santa Chiara repels the Saracens painted in the style of Guglielmo Borremans and Filippo Randazzo. A large altarpiece from the Theatine church of San Lorenzo depicts Sant’Andrea Avellino intercedes in favor of Piazza Armerina with the Madonna delle Vittorie (after 1626), painted by Antonino Cinniardi (or Ginniardi). St Andrea Avellino was named patron of the town in 1626.

In the second room (Sala Gialla) are smaller devotional works of art. There is a Portrait of Prospero Intorcetta, a Jesuit scholar and missionary, who died in 1696 as a missionary to China.

In the third room (Sala Azzurra) has portraits of prominent local citizens, including another Jesuit scholar Filippo Arena (1708-1789), Antonio Pittà (painted 1865), and Domenico Cammarata. Other portraits in the gallery were painted by Giuseppe Paladino (1856-1922), Carmelo Giarrizzo (1850-1917), and Giacomo Velardita (1864-1938).
