= Ancona Indoor Arena =

Ancona Indoor Arena may refer to:

- PalaRossini (opened 2005, capacity 5066), Italian Indoor Arena
- Palaindoor di Ancona (opened 2005, capacity 1600), Italian Indoor Arena
