= 2024 Italian Athletics Indoor Championships =

Edition of the Italian Athletics Indoor Championships

- Dates: 17-18 February
- Host city: Ancona
- Venue: PalaCasali
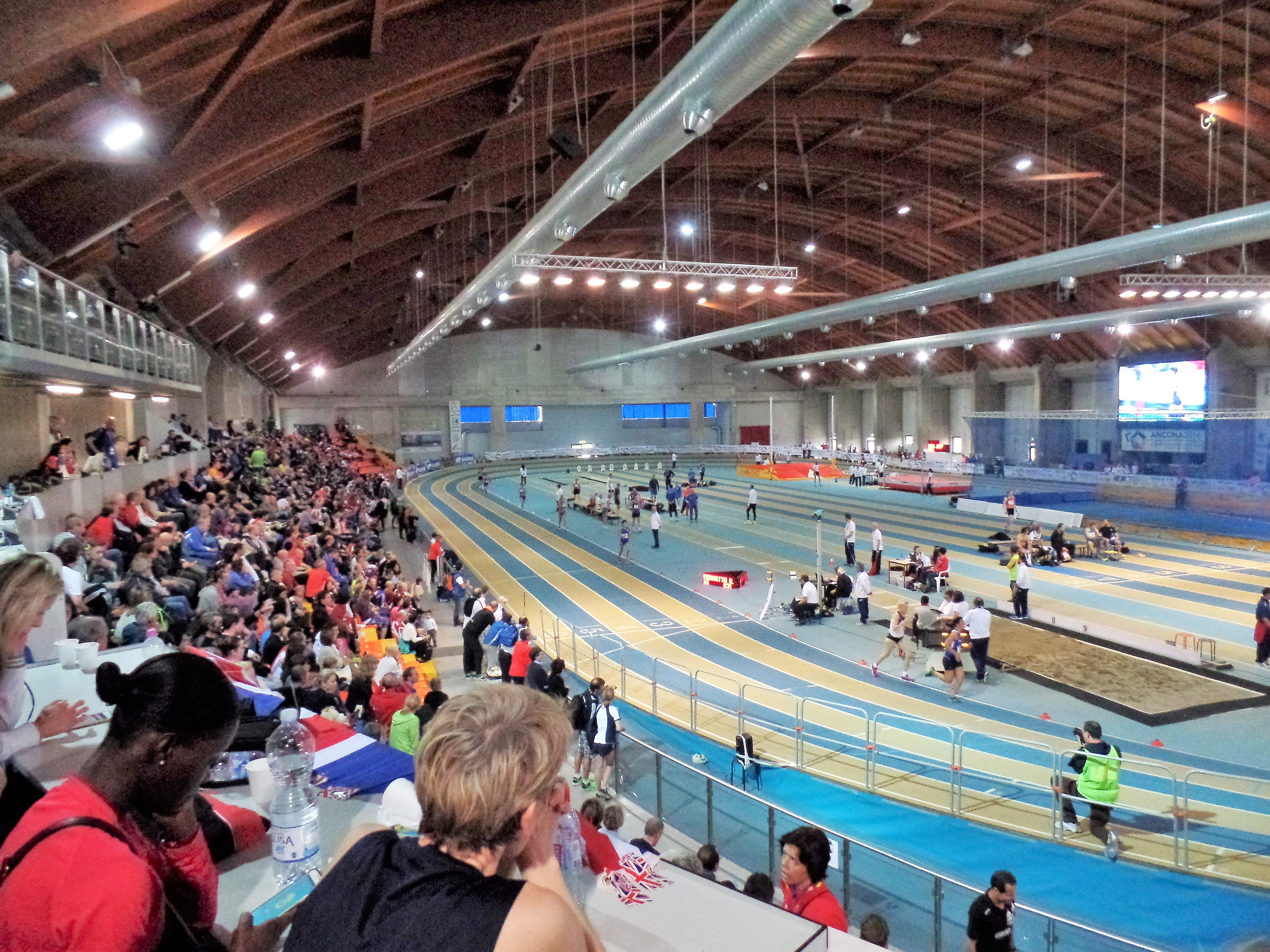
- Level: Senior
- Events: 26 + 2 relays

2024 Italian Athletics Indoor Championships is the 55th edition of the Italian Athletics Indoor Championships held in Ancona.

== Champions ==
Event	Men	Performance	Women	Performance
60 m	Chituru Ali	6.57	Zaynab Dosso	7.06
400 m	Edoardo Scotti	46.57	Ayomide Folorunso	53.20
800 m	Francesco Pernici	1:49.15	Eloisa Coiro	2:03.12
1500 m	Federico Riva	3:39.80	Giulia Aprile	4:12.51
3000 m	Federico Riva	7:57.89	Ludovica Cavalli	8:47.76
60 m hs	Lorenzo Simonelli	7.48 NR	Nicla Mosetti	8.07
5000/3000 m race walk	Francesco Fortunato	18:25.15	Valentina Trapletti	12:17.98
High jump	Marco Fassinotti	2.22 m	Aurora Vicini	1.92 m NJR
Pole vault	Simone Bertelli	5.50 m	Elisa Molinarolo	4.66 m NR
Long jump	Mattia Furlani	8.34 m WJR NR	Larissa Iapichino	6.80 m
Triple jump	Andy Diaz	17.60 m	Veronica Zanon	13.42 m
Shot put	Zane Weir	21.69 m	Anna Musci	15.10 m
Combined events	Lorenzo Modugno	5413 pts	Marta Giovannini	4188 pts
