= Graziano Morotti =

Italian racewalker

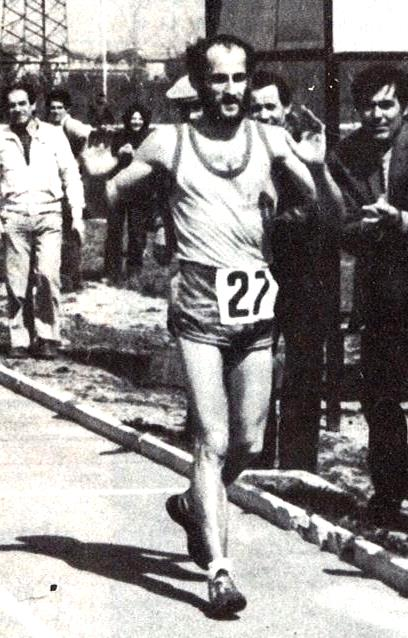
- Morotti in 1981.

Personal information
- National team: Italy: 4 caps (1979-1982)
- Born: 15 January 1951 (age 75) Villa di Serio, Italy

Sport
- Sport: Athletics
- Event: Racewalking
- Club: U.S. Scanzorosciate
- Coached by: Ubaldo Dal Canto

Achievements and titles
- Personal bests: 20 km: 1:26:03 (1980); 50 km: 3:58:52 (1982)

Graziano Morotti (born 15 January 1951) is a former Italian racewalker.

== National records ==
- 50,000 m walk: 3:58:59 ( (Italy) Osio Sopra, 10 October 1981) - current holder.

== Achievements ==
Masters

Year	Competition	Venue	Rank	Event	Time	Notes
2011	World Masters Championships	(United States) Sacramento	1st	5000 mwalk M60	24:09.7	

== National titles ==
Morotti won a title at the national championships at individual senior level.

- Italian Athletics Championships
  - 50 km walk: 1982

== See also ==
- List of Italian records in athletics
- List of Italian records in masters athletics
