= Aurora Vicini =

Italian high jumper

Personal information
- National team: Italian Team
- Born: 23 July 2005 (age 20) Noceto, Italy

Sport
- Sport: Athletics
- Event: High jump
- Club: CUS Parma

Achievements and titles
- Personal best: High jump: 1.92 m (2012)

Aurora Vicini (born 23 July 2005) is an Italian female high jumper 2024 Italian indoor champion, who in February 2024 jumped 1.92 m, obtaining the participation standard for the 2024 European Athletics Championships and placing herself in 16th position in the seasonal world lists and 6th all-time in Italy indoor lists at senior level.

== National records ==
- High jump under-20: 1.92 m – (Italy) Ancona, 18 February 2024

== Personal bests ==
- High jump: 1.92 m – (Italy) Ancona, 18 February 2024

== Achievements ==
Year	Competition	Venue	Rank	Event	Measure	Notes
2022	European U18 Championships	(Israel) Jerusalem	5th	High jump	1.75 m	

== National titles ==
She has won a national title at individual senior level

- Italian Athletics Indoor Championships
  - High jump: 2024

== See also ==
- Italian all-time lists - high jump
