= Silvana Forcellini =

Italian shot putter

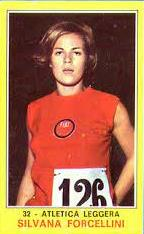

Personal information
- National team: Italy: 22 caps (1963-1972)
- Born: 17 February 1943 Belluno, Italy
- Died: 16 July 2024 (aged 81)

Sport
- Sport: Athletics
- Event: Shot put
- Club: Fiat Torino

Achievements and titles
- Personal best: Shot put: 14.78 m (1972)

Silvana Forcellini (17 February 1943 – 16 July 2024) was an Italian shot putter.

Forcellini won six national championships at individual senior level.

== National records ==
- Shot put: 14.64 m ( (Bosnia and Herzegovina) Zenica, 19 July 1970) - record holder until 3 April 1971.

== National titles ==
- Italian Athletics Championships
  - Long put: 1967, 1968, 1968, 1970 (4)
- Italian Athletics Indoor Championships
  - Shot put: 1970. 1971 (2)
