= Arianna Farfaletti Casali =

Italian sportsperson and athletics competitor (born 1976)

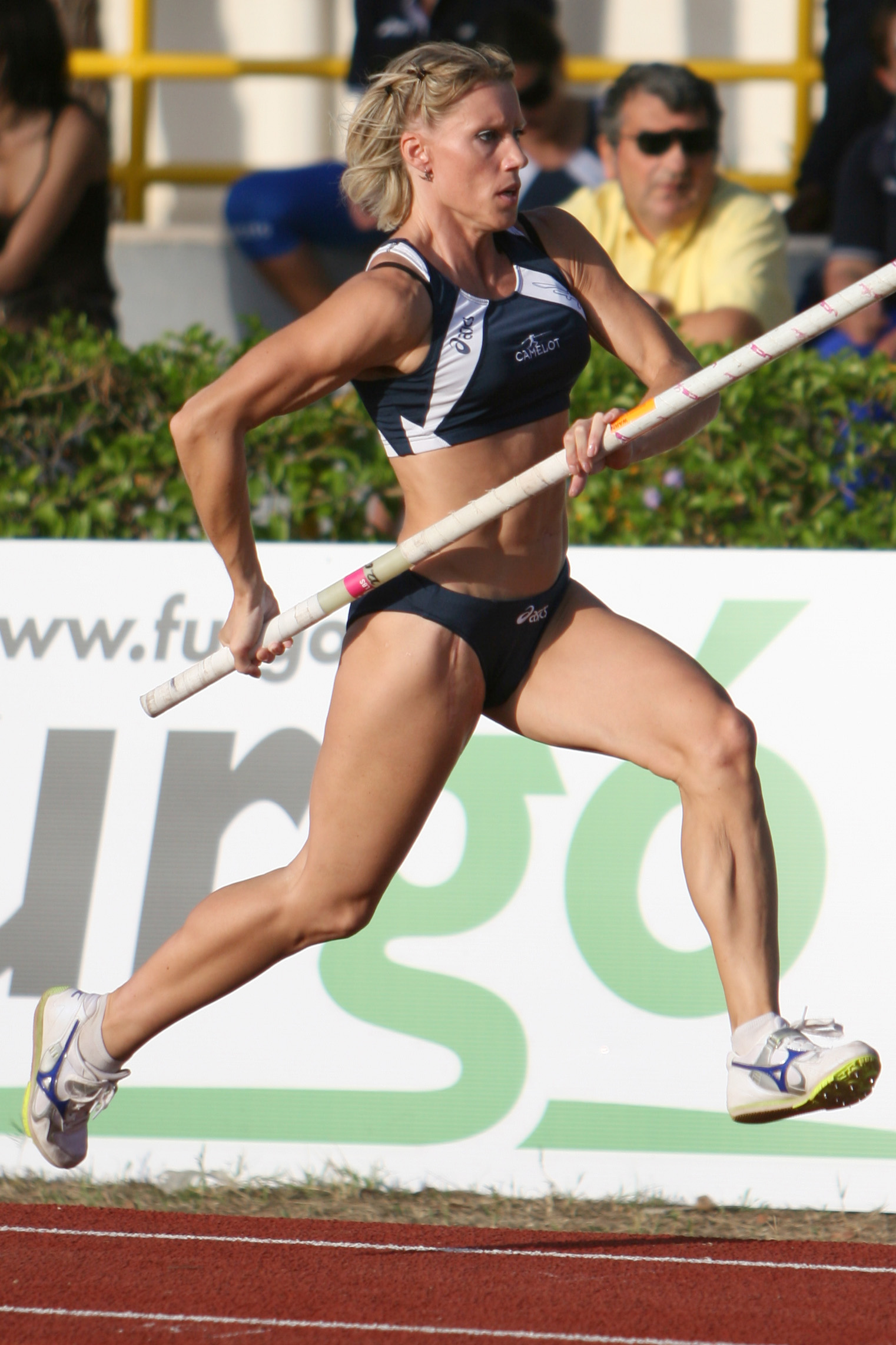

Personal information
- Nationality: Italian
- Born: 22 June 1976 (age 50) Sorengo, Switzerland

Sport
- Country: Italy
- Sport: Athletics
- Event: Pole vault

Achievements and titles
- Personal best: Pole vault: 4.42 m (2008)

Arianna Farfaletti Casali (born 22 June 1976) is a former Italian-born Swiss female pole vaulter.

== Biography ==
She won three national championships at senior level, her personal best 4.42 m, set in Busto Arsizio 2008, that was national record, is still the 4th best Italian performance of all-time (3rd outdoor). In 2008 her measure was also the 42nd world best performance of the year in the IAAF season's lists.

== National records ==
- Pole vault: 4.42 m ( (Italy) Busto Arsizio, 21 September 2008) - holder till 17 May 2009 (broken by Anna Giordano Bruno)

== National titles ==
- Italian Athletics Championships
  - Pole vault: 2000, 2003, 2006

== See also ==
- Italian all-time lists - Pole vault
