= Federico Riva =

Italian middle-distance runner (born 2000)

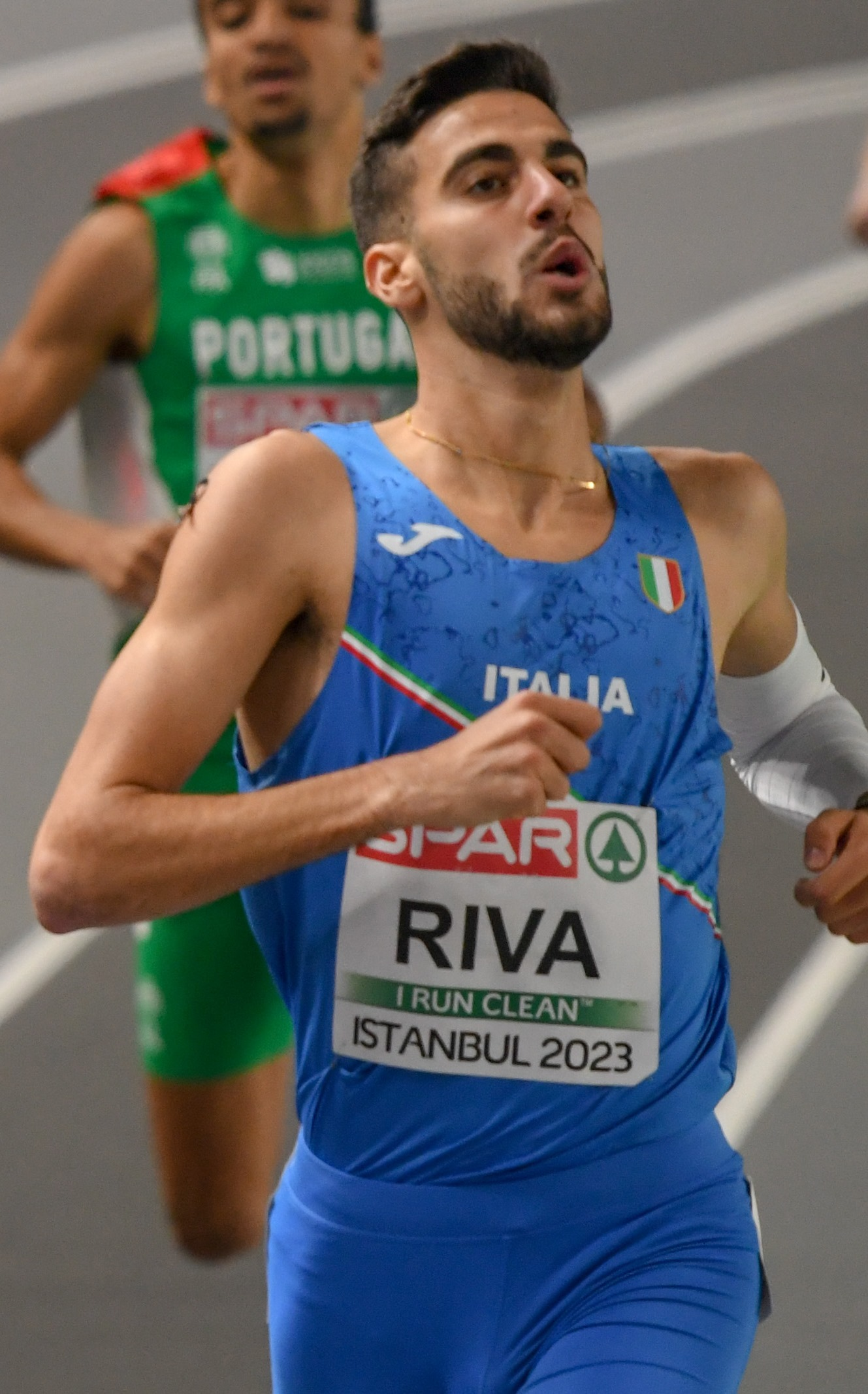
- Riva at Istanbul 2023

Personal information
- National team: Italy: 1 cap (2021-2022)
- Born: 9 November 2000 (age 26) Rome, Italy
- Height: 1.85 m (6 ft 1 in)
- Weight: 66 kg (146 lb)

Sport
- Sport: Athletics
- Event: Middle-distance running
- Club: G.S. Fiamme Gialle
- Coached by: Vittorio Di Saverio

Achievements and titles
- Personal bests: 800 m: 1:44.80 (Rovereto, 2025); 1500 m: 3:31.42 (Rome, 2025); Mile: 3:48.11 (Berlin, 2025) NR; Indoors; 1500 m: 3:31.42 (Liévin, 2026) NR; 2000 m: 5:02.67 (Liévin, 2024) NR; 3000 m: 7:52.63 (Val-de-Reuil, 2025)

Federico Riva (born 8 October 2000) is an Italian middle-distance runner.

== Career ==
Riva won six national championships at senior level during his career.

== Achievements ==
Year	Competition	Venue	Rank	Event	Performance	Notes
2021	European Indoor Championships	(Poland) Toruń	Heat	1500 m	3:45.85	NQ
2024	Olympic Games	(France) Paris	Semifinal	1500 m	3:35.26	

== National titles ==
Riva won 6 national championships at senior level.

- Italian Athletics Championships
  - 1500 m: 2024
- Italian Athletics Indoor Championships
  - 1500 m: 2024, 2025
  - 3000 m: 2022, 2024, 2025

== See also ==
- Italian all-time lists - 1500 metres
