= Giuseppina Torello =

Italian long-distance runner (1943–2024)

Personal information
- National team: Italy (13 caps 1963-1973)
- Born: 3 July 1943 Vicoforte, Italy
- Died: 5 March 2024 (aged 80) Turin

Sport
- Country: Italy
- Sport: Athletics
- Events: Middle-distance running; Cross country running

Achievements and titles
- Personal best: 1500 m: 4:45.51 (1974)

Giuseppina Torello (3 July 1943 – 5 March 2024) was an Italian middle-distance runner and cross-country runner who competed at individual senior level at the World Athletics Cross Country Championships (1973). Torello died on 5 March 2024, at the age of 80.

== National titles ==
Torello won two national championships at individual senior level.

- Italian Athletics Indoor Championships
  - 1500 m: 1972, 1973
