= Alessandra Orselli =

Italian sprinter

Personal information
- Nationality: Italian
- Born: 23 March 1950 (age 76) Florence, Italy

Sport
- Sport: Athletics
- Event: Sprint

Achievements and titles
- Personal bests: 100 m 11.9 (1972); 200 m: 24.7 (1971)

Alessandra Orselli (born 23 March 1950) is an Italian sprinter. She competed in the women's 4 × 100 metres relay at the 1972 Summer Olympics.

== National titles ==
Orselli won three national titles at individual senior level.

- Italian Athletics Indoor Championships
  - 200 m: 1971
  - 400 m: 1972, 1975
