= Laura Gatto =

Italian long jumper

Personal information
- National team: Italy: 2 caps (2001-2002)
- Born: 4 March 1977 (age 49) Montebelluna, Italy

Sport
- Sport: Athletics
- Event: Long jump
- Club: Fiamme Azzurre

Achievements and titles
- Personal best: Long jump: 6.48 m (1999)

Laura Gatto (born 4 March 1977) is a former Italian Long jumper.

== Career ==
Her personal bests, 6.48 m set in 1999 was inside of the 60 best result in the year world top-lists.

== National titles ==
Gatto won six national championships at individual senior level.

- Italian Athletics Championships
  - Long put: 2000, 2001, 2002, 2004 (4)
- Italian Athletics Indoor Championships
  - Long jump: 2000, 2005 (2)
