= Emanuele Formichetti =

Italian long jumper

Personal information
- Nationality: Italian
- Born: 28 May 1983 (age 43) Rieti, Italy
- Height: 1.76 m (5 ft 9 in)
- Weight: 70 kg (154 lb)

Sport
- Country: Italy
- Sport: Athletics
- Event: Long jump
- Club: C.S. Esercito
- Coached by: Roberto Pericoli

Achievements and titles
- Personal best: Long jump: 8.10 m (2010)

Emanuele Formichetti (born 28 May 1983) is an Italian long jumper.

== Biography ==
On 30 June 2010, at Italian Championships in Grosseto, held second place behind Andrew Howe, got the tenth best Italian benefit of all time with measuring 8.10 meters.

== Achievements ==
Year	Competition	Venue	Position	Event	Time	Notes
2010	European Championships	(Spain) Barcelona	16th	Long jump	7.91 m	

== See also ==
- Italian all-time lists - Long jump
