= Cosimo Caliandro =

Italian middle-distance runner

Personal information
- National team: Italy (11 caps from 2004 to 2008)
- Born: 11 March 1982 Francavilla Fontana, Italy
- Died: 10 June 2011 (aged 29) Francavilla Fontana, Italy

Sport
- Country: Italy
- Sport: Athletics
- Event: Middle-distance running
- Club: G.S. Fiamme Gialle
- Coached by: Stefano Cecchini

Achievements and titles
- Personal bests: 800 m: 1:51.50 (2005); 1500 m: 3:40.57 (1999); 3000 m indoor: 7:48.88 (2007)
Medal record
European Indoor Championships
Gold medal – first place	2007 Birmingham	3000 m

Cosimo Caliandro (11 March 1982 – 10 June 2011) was an Italian middle-distance runner who won a gold medal at the 2007 European Indoor Championships.

== Biography ==
Caliandro was born in Francavilla Fontana. In his first appearance on the world stage, he ran in the 1500 metres at the 1999 World Youth Championships in Athletics, but did not progress beyond the heats. He also competed at the European Youth Olympic Festival that year and he won the gold medal in the 800 metres. His first major medal came at the 2001 European Athletics Junior Championships, where he became the 1500 metres champion.

As a junior athlete, he represented Italy at the IAAF World Cross Country Championships placing 100th in 2000, and improving to 68th the following year. At the 2001 European Cross Country Championships, he came 28th overall in the men's junior race. His first participation at world senior level was a 44th place at the 2004 World Cross Country Championships.

Caliandro was eliminated in the heats of the 3000 metres at the 2005 European Athletics Indoor Championships, but returned two years later to win in the event final at the 2007 European Indoor Athletics Championships in Birmingham. He represented Italy at the 2008 European Athletics Indoor Cup, taking silver over 3000 m.

He won the Cross Della Volpe in Piedmont and earned a spot at the 2010 European Cross Country Championships.

He died on 10 June 2011, as a result of a motorbike accident in his native town of Francavilla Fontana, in southern Italy. He had a wife and two sons.

== National titles ==
He won 3 national championships at individual senior level.

- Italian Athletics Championships
  - 5000 metres: 2006
- Italian Indoor Athletics Championships
  - 3000 metres: 2005, 2006
