= Eleonora Berlanda =

Italian middle-distance runner

Personal information
- National team: Italy
- Born: 4 April 1976 (age 50) Bolzano, Italy
- Height: 1.73 m (5 ft 8 in)
- Weight: 57 kg (126 lb)

Sport
- Country: Italy
- Sport: Athletics
- Event: Middle-distance running
- Club: G.S. Fiamme Oro

Achievements and titles
- Personal bests: 800: 2:02.74 (2005); 1500: 4:07.54 (2005); 3000: 9:23.53 (2012)

Eleonora Berlanda (born 4 April 1976) is a former Italian female middle-distance runner who competed at individual senior level at the 2005 World Championships in Athletics – Women's 1500 metres.

== National titles ==
She won five national championships at individual senior level.

- Italian Athletics Championships
  - 800 m: 1995
  - 1500 m: 2004, 2005, 2006
- Italian Athletics Indoor Championships
  - 800 m: 1995
