= Emanuele Abate =

Italian hurdler

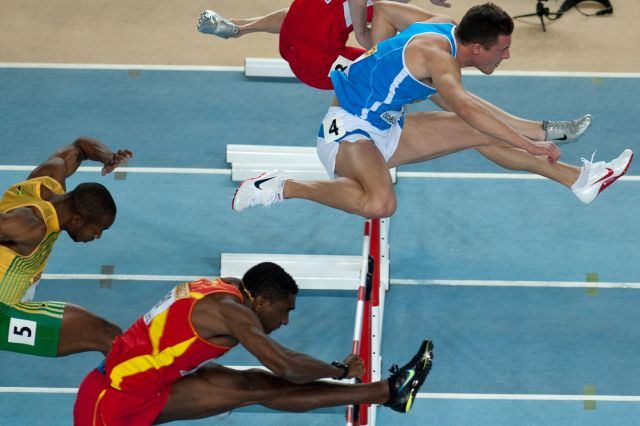
- Emanuele Abate (in blue jersey) at istanbul 2012.

Personal information
- Nationality: Italian
- Born: 8 July 1985 (age 41) Genoa, Italy
- Height: 1.90 m (6 ft 3 in)
- Weight: 72 kg (159 lb)

Sport
- Country: Italy
- Sport: Athletics
- Event: 110 metres hurdles
- Club: G.S. Fiamme Oro

Achievements and titles
- Personal bests: 60 m hs: 7"57 (2012); 110 m hs: 13"28 (2012)
Medal record
European U23 Championships
Bronze medal – third place	2007 Debrecen	110 m hurdles
Universiade
Bronze medal – third place	2009 Belgrade	110 m hurdles

Emanuele Abate (born 8 July 1985) is an Italian athlete competing in the 110 metres hurdles. He was born in Genoa.

== Biography ==
In 2012 he twice improved the national record, first time in Montgeron on 13 May 2012 with 13"32, second time in Turin, on 8 June, at Memorial Primo Nebiolo, with 13"28.

== National records ==
- 60 metres hurdles indoor: 7.57 (4 February 2012 (Switzerland) Magglingen) – Until 1 March 2013
- 110 metres hurdles: 13.28 (8 June 2012 (Italy) Turin)

== Progression ==
110 m hurdles

Year	Performance	Venue	Date	World Ranking
2016	13.54	(Netherlands) Amsterdam	9 July 2016	
2013	13.49	(United Kingdom) Gateshead	23 June 2013	
2012	13.28	(Italy) Turin	8 June 2012	13th
2011	13.54	(Italy) Rieti	10 September 2011	59th
2010	13.72	(Switzerland) Chiasso	23 June 2010	
2009	13.65	(Italy) Nembro	22 July 2009	
2008	13.66	(Italy) Celle Ligure	24 June 2008	
2007	13.62	(Thailand) Bangkok	10 August 2007	
2006	13.59	(Switzerland) Geneva	11 June 2006	
2004	14.64	(Italy) Brixen	29 May 2004	

== Achievements ==
Year	Competition	Venue	Position	Event	Performance	Notes
2011	World Championships	(South Korea) Daegu	21st Quarter	110 m hs	13.63	
2012	Olympic Games	(United Kingdom) London	10th Semi	110 m hs	13.35	
2016	European Championships	(Netherlands) Amsterdam	12th Semi	110 m hs	13.54	SB

== National titles ==
He has won the individual national championship six times.

- 3 wins in the 110 metres hurdles (2007, 2008, 2011)
- 3 wins in the 60 metres hurdles indoor (2008, 2009, 2011)

== See also ==
- Italian records in athletics
- Italian all-time lists – 110 metres hurdles
