= Filippo Randazzo =

Italian painter

Filippo Randazzo (18th century) was an Italian painter, active in Palermo.
