= Valeria Canella =

Italian long jumper

Personal information
- National team: Italy: 7 caps (2003-2009)
- Born: 6 February 1982 (age 44) Turin, Italy
- Height: 1.71 m (5 ft 7 in)
- Weight: 60 kg (132 lb)

Sport
- Sport: Athletics
- Event: Long jump
- Club: G.S. Fiamme Azzurre
- Retired: 2013

Achievements and titles
- Personal bests: Long jump: 6.56 m (2007); Long jump indoor: 6.53 m (2008)

Valeria Canella (born 6 February 1982) is a former Italian long jump, who was four-time national champion at senior level.

== Career ==
Her best sporting season was undoubtedly 2007, when at the age of 25, in addition to winning his third national title (she will win her fourth and last one the following year), she set both her personal bests, 6.52 m indoor and above all 6.56 m outdoor, which result, at the end of the 2020 outdoor season, is still the 9th best all-time performance of the Italian lists and in that year it was also the 67th best result in the world top-lists.

Her best placement in the world top-lists was however the 30th place in the 2007 indoor season. However, her personal best of 2008 of 6.53 m, ratified by FIDAL but not by the IAAF, would have been the 26th best performance of the year in the 2008 world lists.

== National titles ==
- Italian Athletics Championships
  - Long jump: 2006 (1)
- Italian Indoor Athletics Championships
  - Long jump: 2006, 2007, 2008 (3)
