= Sisport =

Italian basketball team

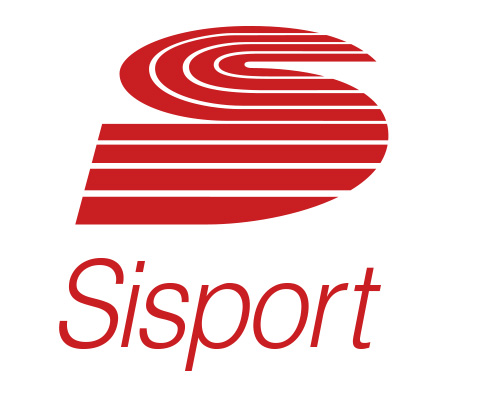
Logo of Sisport (1978–)

Sisport is a multi-sports team based in Turin, Italy.

== History ==
Gruppo Sportivo FIAT (G.S. FIAT) was founded in 1922 by employees of the eponymous automobile manufacturer the city of Turin is still associated with. Since 1978, it was first known as Sisport Fiat and then simply as Sisport. The club now primarily supports amateur and youth sports due to the emergence of professionalism in various sports.

== Sports ==
- Athletics
- Football (youth only)
- Rowing
- Rugby
- Swimming

== Women's Basketball ==
Gruppo Sportivo FIAT
- Founded: 1922
- Location: Turin, Italy
- Championships: 1 Euroleague Women

FIAT has won Euroleague Women in the 1979–80 season and two Italian Championships.

=== Titles ===
- 1 Euroleague Women (1980)
- 5 Italian Championships - Lega Basket Femminile (1962, 1963, 1964, 1979, 1980)

== Athletics ==
Notable former athletes include racewalker champion Ileana Salvador, Mediterranean Games gold medalist Marisa Masullo, and the four Olympic gold medalists Pietro Mennea, Sara Simeoni, Maurizio Damilano and Gabriella Dorio (in that period under the administration of Giampiero Boniperti and the sponsorship of Fiat Iveco).

=== Titles ===
- 1 European Champion Clubs Cup (1993)

== Honors ==
- Medaglia d'Onore al merito sportivo (Medal of Honor for Sporting Merit): 1963, 2009

== Notable athletes ==
- Alessio Boggiatto, World Aquatics Championships gold medalist
- Chiara Boggiatto, swimmer and Mediterranean Games gold medalist
- Lorenzo Calafiore, wrestler and Mediterranean Games gold medalist
- Claudio Marchisio, footballer for Juventus FC and Italy national football team (played some of his youth football at Sisport)
- Louis Buffon, footballer for Pisa SC.
