= Palasport di Genova =

Indoor arena in Genoa, Italy

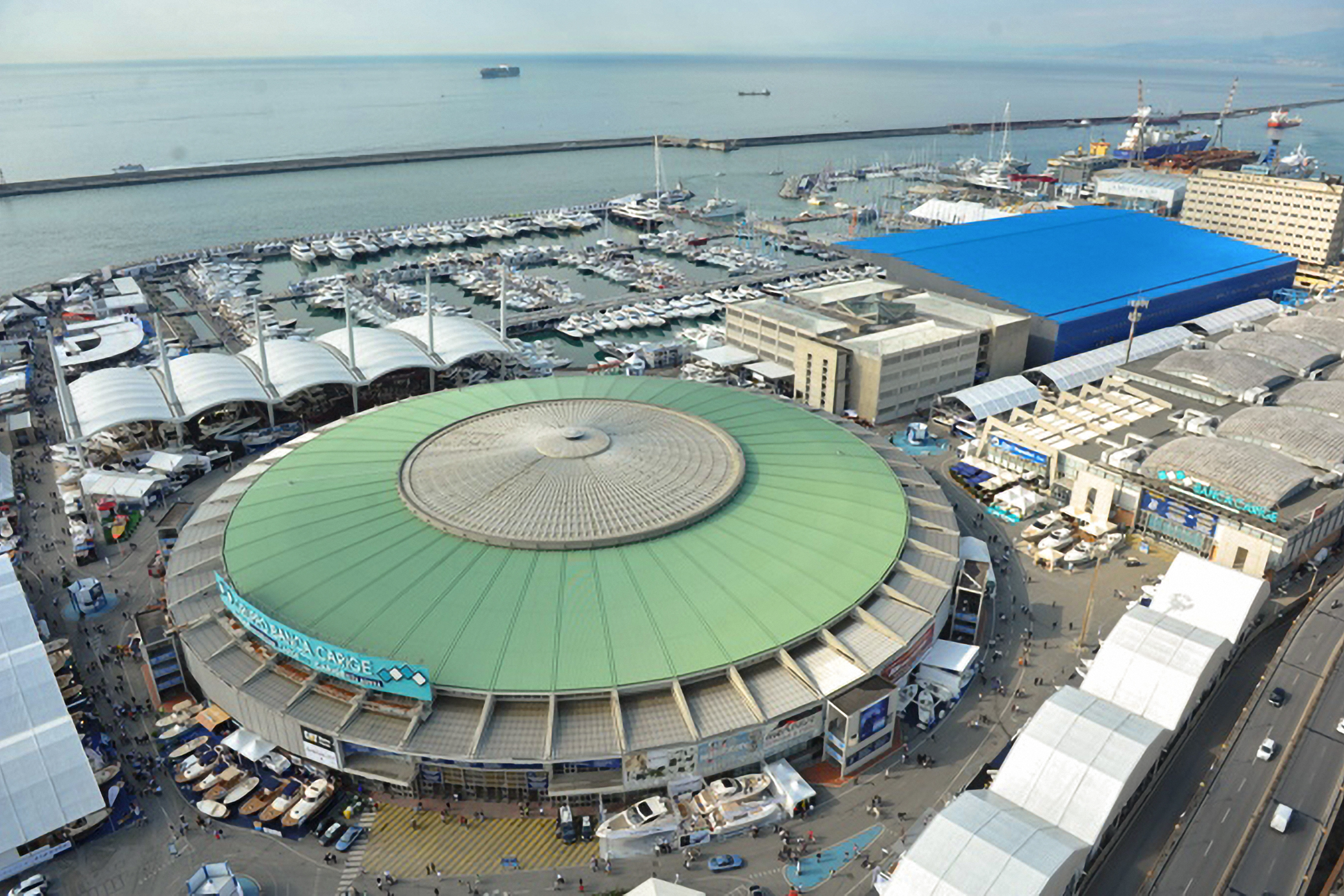
- Interactive map of Palasport di Genova
- Location: Genoa, Italy
- Coordinates: 44°23′44″N 8°56′28″E
- Capacity: 15,000

Construction
- Groundbreaking: 1961
- Opened: 1962
- Architects: Studio Palasport Group (Leo Finzi, Martinoja, Pagani and Sironi)

Tenants
- Athletic Genova (1970s); 1992 European Athletics Indoor Championships

Palasport di Genova is an indoor arena in Genoa, Italy. The arena holds 15,000 spectators. It is primarily used for indoor athletics, motocross events and concerts. It is located within the area that hosts the Genoa Fair, of which it represents the S Pavilion.

== Events ==
From 1970 to 2008, it hosted twenty-two editions of the Italian Indoor Athletics Championships and in 1983 it hosted the only indoor edition of the Italian Super Bowl. It was one of the venues for the European Indoor Athletics Championships in 1992.

The Euroflora exhibition was held here from the first edition in 1966 until 2011 (every 5 years for a total of ten editions).

== Concerts ==
The arena has a spectator capacity of 15,000 spectators during concerts. The Beatles performed here on June 26, 1965 and Kiss on August 31, 1980. Other performers include Peter Gabriel, Iron Maiden, Jethro Tull, Frank Zappa, America, Santana, Eric Clapton, Joni Mitchell, Spandau Ballet, Frank Sinatra.

== See also ==
- List of indoor arenas in Italy

Preceded by Kelvin Hall; Glasgow	European Indoor Championships in Athletics; Venue; 1992	Succeeded by Palais Omnisports de Paris-Bercy; Paris
