= Elisa Cusma =

Italian middle-distance runner

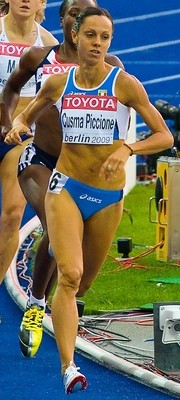
- Elisa Cusma at the 2009 World Championships in Berlin

Personal information
- Full name: Elisa Cusma Piccione
- Born: 24 July 1981 (age 44) Bologna, Italy
- Height: 1.67 m (5 ft 5 1/2 in)
- Weight: 49 kg (108 lb)

Sport
- Country: Italy
- Sport: Athletics
- Event: Middle-distance running
- Club: C.S. Esercito
- Coached by: Claudio Guizzardi

Achievements and titles
- Personal bests: 800 m: 1:58.63 (2007); 1500 m: 4:04.98 (2009)
Medal record
European Athletics Indoor Championships
Bronze medal – third place	2009 Turin	800 metres

Elisa Cusma (born 24 July 1981 in Bologna) is a former Italian middle-distance runner who specialized in the 800 metres.

== Biography ==
She finished seventh at the 2007 World Athletics Final, sixth at the 2008 World Indoor Championships, sixth at the 2008 World Athletics Final and won the bronze medal at the 2009 European Indoor Championships.

She also competed at the 2005 World Championships, the 2006 World Indoor Championships, the 2006 European Championships, the 2007 European Indoor Championships, the 2007 World Championships and the 2008 Olympic Games without reaching the final round.

She finished seventh at the inaugural European Team Championships in 2009, finishing with 2:00.93. She set a personal best time of 1:58.63 at the 2007 World Championships in Osaka. She also has a personal best time of 4:09.34 in the 1500 metres, achieved in June 2007 in Milan. At 2009 World Championships, she finished sixth in the final with 1:58.81.

== National titles ==
Elisa Cusma has won the individual national championship 18 times.

- 5 wins in the 800 metres (2005, 2006, 2007, 2008, 2009)
- 3 wins in the 1500 metres (2010, 2011, 2012)
- 6 wins in the 800 metres indoor (2007, 2008, 2009, 2010, 2012, 2013)
- 4 wins in the 1500 metres indoor (2006, 2009, 2010, 2012)

== See also ==
- Italian all-time top lists - 800 m
- Italian all-time top lists - 1500 m
