= Christian Obrist =

Italian athlete

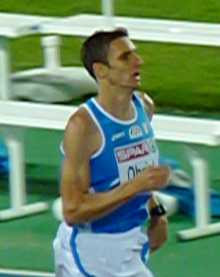

Personal information
- Nationality: Italian
- Born: 20 September 1980 (age 45) Brixen, Italy
- Height: 1.86 m (6 ft 1 in)
- Weight: 66 kg (146 lb)

Sport
- Country: Italy
- Sport: Athletics
- Event: Middle distance running
- Club: C.S. Carabinieri

Achievements and titles
- Personal best: 1500 m: 3:34.22 (2007)
Medal record
Mediterranean Games
Bronze medal – third place	2005 Almería	1500 metres

Christian Obrist (born 20 November 1980 in Brixen) is an Italian middle distance runner, who specializes in the 1500-metre run.

== Biography ==
Obrist finished seventh in the 1500 metres final at both the 2002 European Athletics Championships in Munich and the 2006 European Athletics Championships in Gothenburg. He was also a semi-finalist at the 2003 World Championships in Athletics.

His personal best time is 3:35.32 minutes, achieved in September 2007 in Rieti. He first represented the sports club SSV Brixen, than C.S. Carabinieri.

== Achievements ==
Year	Competition	Venue	Position	Event	Notes
Representing Italy
2001	European U23 Championships	Amsterdam, Netherlands	4th	1500 metres	3:39.58
2002	European Championships	Munich, Germany	7th	1500 metres	3:46.57
2008	Olympic Games	Beijing, China	11th	1500 metres	3:39.87
2010	European Championships	Barcelona, Spain	7th	1500 metres	3:43.91

== National titles ==
Christian Obrist has won 12 times the individual national championship.

- 8 wins in the 1500 metres (2000, 2002, 2003, 2004, 2005, 2006, 2007, 2012)
- 4 wins in the 1500 metres indoor (2001, 2006, 2008, 2009)

== See also ==
- Italian all-time top lists - 1500 metres
