= Palaindoor di Ancona =

Indoor arena in Ancona, Italy

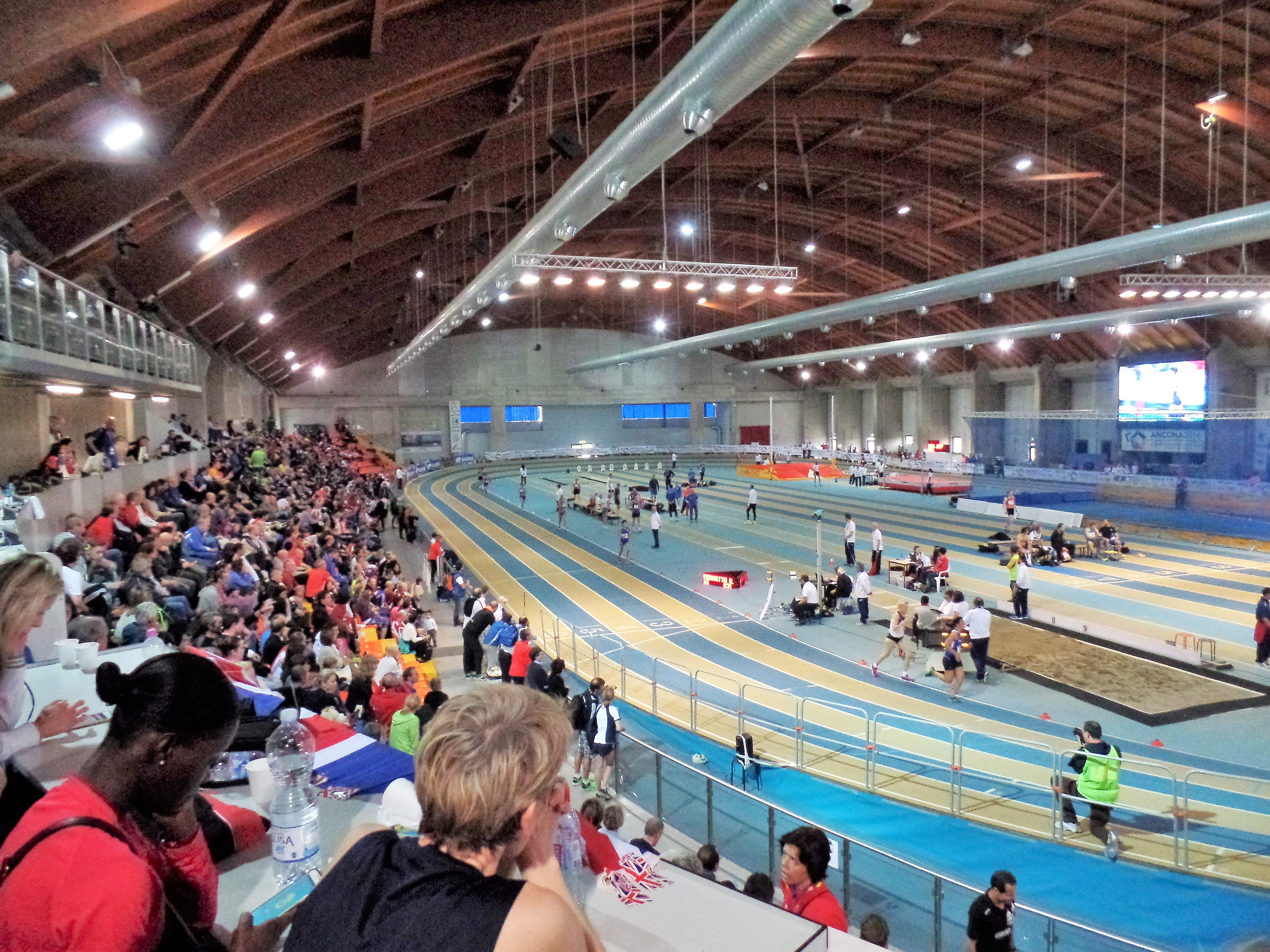
- Interactive map of Palaindoor di Ancona
- Location: Ancona, Italy
- Coordinates: 43°21′14″N 13°18′13″E
- Capacity: 1,600

Construction
- Opened: 2005

Tenant
- Ancona Municipality

Palaindoor di Ancona since December 2023 named (and per five years) as PalaCasali is an indoor arena in Ancona, Italy. The arena holds 2,069 spectators. It is primarily used for indoor athletics. It is located in Palombare.

== Events ==
Thirteen editions of the championships were held in this indoor arena, uninterruptedly Italian Athletics Indoor Championships from 2010 to 2024 with the exception of the editions 2008 (Genoa), 2009 (Turin) and 2015 that was held in Padua.

== See also ==
- List of indoor arenas in Italy
