= Italian Athletics Indoor Championships =

Italian athletic event

Italian Athletics Indoor Championships Campionati assoluti di atletica leggera indoor
- Current season, competition or edition: 2026 Italian Athletics Indoor Championships
- Sport: Athletics
- Founded: 1970
- Country: Italy
- Related competitions: Outdoor Championships
- Website: Fidal.it

The Italian Athletics Indoor Championships (Italian: Italian Athletics Indoor Championships) are the national championships in athletics of the indoor events, organised every year by the Federazione Italiana di Atletica Leggera from 1970 (first edition was held in Genoa). Titles assigned concern specialties indoors, so for example does not include 3000 meters steeplechase, discus throw, javelin throw, hammer throw.

== Editions ==
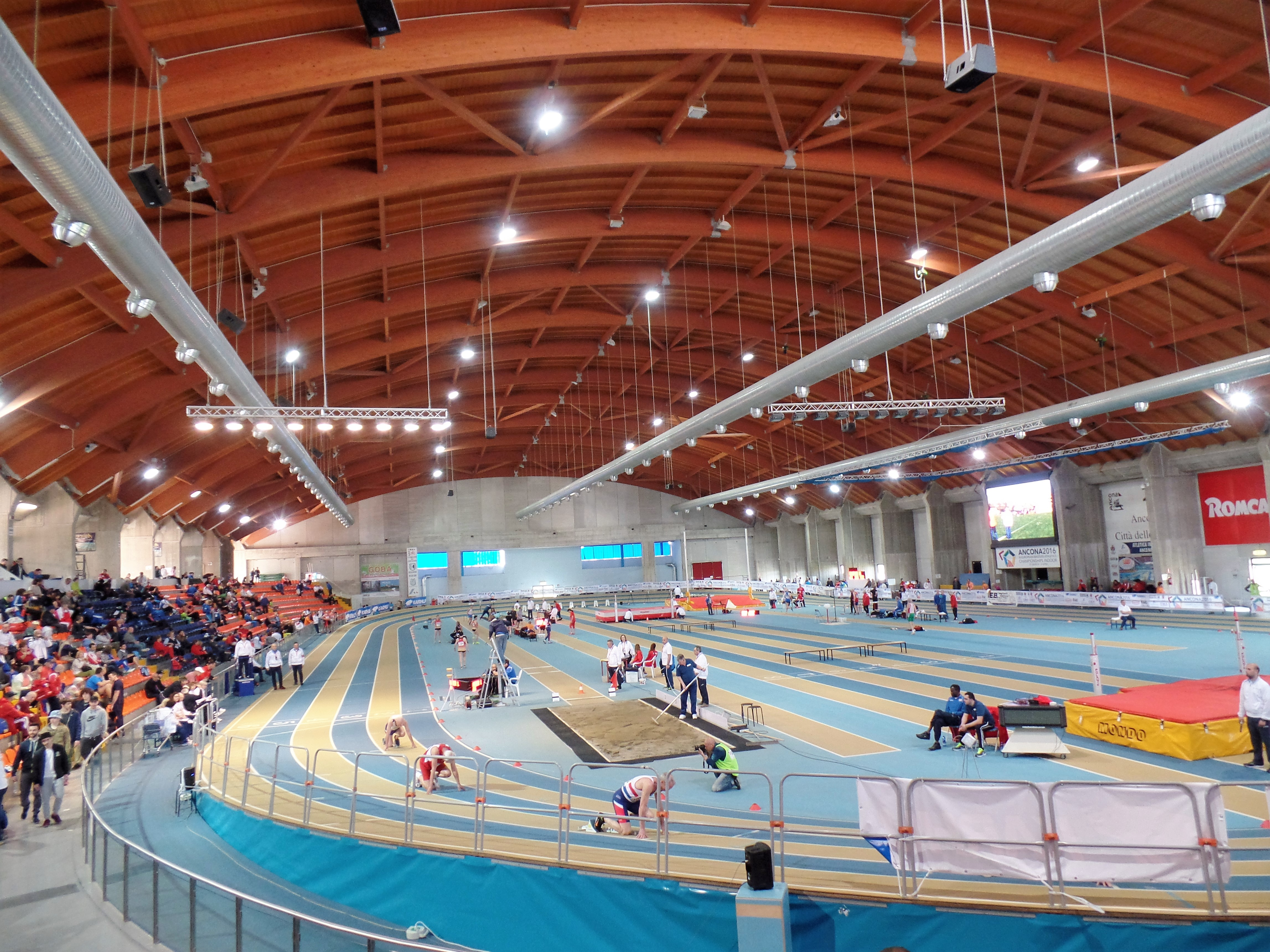
Ancona Palaindoor which from 2005 to 2021 hosted 15 editions out of 16 of the championships.

Year	City	Dates	Venue
1970	Genoa	21-22 March	
1971	Genoa	23-24 February	
1972	Genoa	22-23 February	
1973	Genoa	20-21 February	
1974	Genoa	26-27 February	
1975	Genoa	18-19 February	
1976	Milan	10-11 February	
1977	Milan	23-24 February	
1978	Milan	22-23 February	
1979	Genoa	14-15 February	
1980	Milan	19-20 February	
1981	Genoa	10-11 February	
1982	Turin	9-10 February	
1983	Turin	22-23 February	
1984	Turin	22-23 February	
1985	Turin	20-21 February	
1986	Genoa	5-6 February	
1987	Turin	11-12 February	
1988	Florence	23-24 February	
1989	Turin	11 February	
1990	Turin	21 February	
1991	Genoa	20 February	
1992	Genoa	14-15 February	
1993	Genoa	14 February	
1994	Genoa	12 February	
1995	Genoa	26 February	
1996	Turin	24-25 February	
1997	Genoa	22-23 February	

Year	City	Dates	Venue
1998	Genoa	7-8 February	
1999	Genoa	20-21 February	
2000	Genoa	12-13 February	
2001	Turin	24-25 February	
2002	Genoa	16-17 February	
2003	Genoa	1-2 March	
2004	Genoa	21-22 February	
2005	Ancona	19-20 February	Palaindoor
2006	Ancona	18-19 February	Palaindoor
2007	Ancona	17-18 February	Palaindoor
2008	Genoa	23-24 February	Palaindoor
2009	Turin	21-22 February	Oval Lingotto
2010	Ancona	27-28 February	Palaindoor
2011	Ancona	19-20 February	Palaindoor
2012	Ancona	25-26 February	Palaindoor
2013	Ancona	16-17 February	Palaindoor
2014	Ancona	22-23 February	Palaindoor
2015	Padua	21-22 February	Palaindoor
2016	Ancona	5-6 March	Palaindoor
2017	Ancona	18-19 February	Palaindoor
2018	Ancona	16-18 February	Palaindoor
2019	Ancona	15-17 February	Palaindoor
2020	Ancona	22-23 February	Palaindoor
2021	Ancona	20-21 February	Palaindoor
2022	Ancona	26–27 February	Palaindoor
2023	Ancona	18–19 February	Palaindoor
2024	Ancona	17–18 February	PalaCasali
2025	Ancona	22–23 February	PalaCasali
2026	Ancona	28 February–1 March	PalaCasali

== Championship records ==
=== Men ===
Event	Record	Athlete	Date	Championships	Place	Ref.
100 m						
200 m						
60 m hurdles	7.48 NR	Lorenzo Simonelli	17 February 2024	2024 Championships	Ancona	
Long jump	8.34 m NR	Mattia Furlani	17 February 2024	2024 Championships	Ancona	
Triple jump	17.60 m	Andy Díaz	18 February 2024	2024 Championships	Ancona	
Heptathlon	6121 pts NR	Dario Dester	28 February−1 March 2026	2024 Championships	Ancona	
Heptathlon	60m / Long jump / Shot put / High jump / 60m H / Pole vault / 1000m; 6.91 / 7.48 m / 14.86 m / 1.98 m / 7.96 / 4.70 m / 2:37.69					
5000 m race walk	17:54.48 WR	Francesco Fortunato	28 February 2026	2024 Championships	Ancona	

=== Women ===
Event	Record	Athlete	Date	Championships	Place	Ref.
60 m	7.06	Zaynab Dosso	18 February 2024	2024 Championships	Ancona	
400 m	52.02	Eloisa Coiro	1 March 2026	2024 Championships	Ancona	
Long jump	6.91 m NR	Larissa Iapichino	20 February 2021	2021 Championships	Ancona	
Pole vault	4.66 m NR	Elisa Molinarolo	17 February 2024	2024 Championships	Ancona	
Pentathlon	4451 pts NR	Sveva Gerevini	26 February 2022	2022 Championships	Ancona	
Pentathlon	60m H / High jump / Shot put / Long jump / 800m; 8.38 / 1.71 m / 11.85 m / 6.34 m / 2:12.16					

== See also ==
- List of Italian Athletics Indoor Championships winners
- Italian Athletics Championships
- Italian Winter Throwing Championships
- List of Italian Athletics Championships winners
