= List of Italian Athletics Indoor Championships winners =

The Italian Athletics Indoor Championships (Italian: Campionati italiani assoluti di atletica leggera indoor) are the national championships in athletics of the indoor events, organised every year by the Federazione Italiana di Atletica Leggera from 1970 (first edition was held in Genoa). Titles assigned concern specialties indoors, so for example does not include 3000 meters steeplechase, discus throw, javelin throw, hammer throw.

== Men ==
=== 60 m, 200 m, 400 m ===
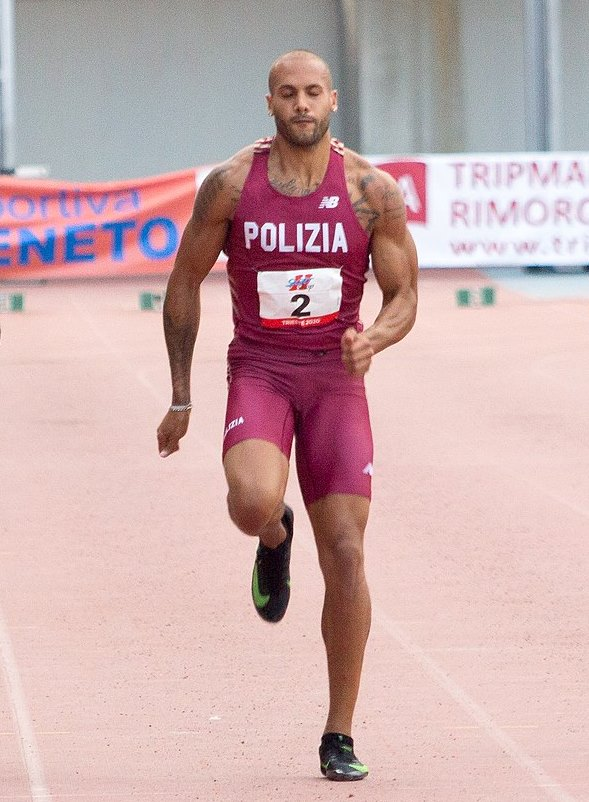
Marcell Jacobs, 2021 and 2022 winner of the 60 m with 6.55.

Year	60 metres		200 metres		400 metres	
1970	Pasqualino Abeti	6.7	not held		Bruno Bianchi	49.0
1971	Vincenzo Guerini	6.9	Umberto Tedeschi	22.0	Bruno Bianchi (2)	49.5
1972	Vittorio Roscio	6.7	not held		Marcello Fiasconaro	46.4
1973	Vincenzo Guerini (2)	6.6	not held		Pasqualino Abeti	48.2
1974	Dominique Chauvelot (FRA)	6.67	not held		Stavros Tziortzis (GRE)	47.8
1975	Luciano Caravani	6.79	not held		Marian Gesicki (POL)	48.4
1976	Pietro Mennea	6.71	not held		Alfonso Di Guida	47.89
1977	Steve Riddick (USA)	6.66	not held		Alfons Brydenbach (BEL)	47.19
1978	Vincenzo Guerini (3)	6.79	not held		Pietro Mennea	47.86
1979	Franco Zucchini	6.73	not held		Stefano Malinverni	47.0
1980	Gianfranco Lazzer	6.74	Pasqualino Abeti	21.49	Stefano Malinverni (2)	47.29
1981	Franco Zucchini (2)	6.78	not held		Roberto Ribaud	47.82
1982	Giovanni Grazioli	6.71	Michele Di Pace	21.65	Roberto Ribaud (2)	48.08
1983	Giovanni Grazioli (2)	6.68	Luca Vaccari	22.05	Daniele D'Amico	48.46
1984	Antonio Ullo	6.72	Carlo Simionato	20.90	Donato Sabia	46.86
1985	Pierfrancesco Pavoni	6.74	Stefano Tilli	20.52	Roberto Ribaud (3)	46.81
1986	Antonio Ullo (2)	6.69	Giovanni Bongiorni	21.48	Leonardo Poli	47.85
1987	Pierfrancesco Pavoni (2)	6.61	Stefano Tilli (2)	20.62	Vito Petrella	46.84
1988	Antonio Ullo (3)	6.20	Marco Lavazza	22.17	Alessandro Pinna	48.27
1989	Antonio Ullo (4)	6.69	Paolo Catalano	21.05	Donato Sabia (2)	46.52
1990	Antonio Ullo (5)	6.72	Carlo Occhiena	20.99	Andrea Nuti	46.89
1991	Andrea Amici	6.76	Giovanni Puggioni	21.09	Andrea Nuti (2)	47.30
1992	Ezio Madonia	6.68	Sandro Floris	21.15	Andrea Nuti (3)	46.56
1993	Andrea Amici (2)	6.69	Carlo Occhiena (2)	21.19	Fabio Grossi	47.54
1994	Alessandro Orlandi	6.76	Giorgio Marras	21.15	Andrea Nuti (4)	46.59
1995	Stefano Tilli	6.66	Angelo Cipolloni	21.14	Ashraf Saber	46.92
1996	Stefano Tilli (2)	6.69	Marco Vaccari	21.29	Ashraf Saber (2)	46.45
1997	Giovanni Puggioni	6.69	Angelo Cipolloni (2)	21.12	Marco Vaccari	46.98
1998	Francesco Scuderi	6.63	Carlo Occhiena (3)	21.11	Ashraf Saber (3)	46.49
1999	Andrea Rabino	6.73	Carlo Occhiena (4)	21.32	Edoardo Vallet	47.19
2000	Stefano Tilli (3)	6.61	Marco Torrieri	21.15	Edoardo Vallet (2)	47.34
2001	Francesco Scuderi (2)	6.67	Alessandro Attene	21.03	Sunday Bada (NGR)	46.27
2002	Francesco Scuderi (3)	6.66	Alessandro Attene (2)	21.07	Ashraf Saber (4)	47.24
2003	Andrea Rabino (2)	6.67	Marco Torrieri (2)	20.78	Edoardo Vallet (3)	46.69
2004	Simone Collio	6.64	Massimiliano Donati	21.08	Andrea Barberi	47.15
2005	Simone Collio (2)	6.63	Massimiliano Donati (2)	21.31	Edoardo Vallet (4)	47.94
2006	Francesco Scuderi (4)	6.69	not held		Gianni Carabelli	48.51
2007	Massimiliano Donati	6.62	not held		Andrea Barberi (2)	46.78
2008	Giovanni Tomasicchio	6.73	not held		Claudio Licciardello	46.53
2009	Simone Collio (3)	6.63	not held		Claudio Licciardello (2)	46.03
2010	Jacques Riparelli	6.73	not held		Domenico Fontana	47.70
2011	Michael Tumi	6.71	not held		Lorenzo Valentini	48.08
2012	Michael Tumi (2)	6.64	not held		Lorenzo Valentini (2)	46.88
2013	Michael Tumi (3)	6.51	not held		Isalbet Juarez	47.11
2014	Fabio Cerutti	6.68	not held		Matteo Galvan	46.97
2015	Delmas Obou	6.66	not held		Matteo Galvan (2)	46.80
2016	Michael Tumi (3)	6.68	not held		Matteo Galvan (3)	47.29
2017	Massimiliano Ferraro	6.64	not held		Marco Lorenzi	47.17
2018	Michael Tumi (4)	6.70	not held		Vladimir Aceti	46.95
2019	Luca Lai	6.71	not held		Michele Tricca	46.85
2020	Filippo Tortu	6.60	not held		Michele Tricca	48.02
2021	Marcell Jacobs	6.55	not held		Vladimir Aceti (2)	46.57
2022	Marcell Jacobs (2)	6.55	not held		Brayan Lopez	46.87
2023	Samuele Ceccarelli	6.54	not held		Riccardo Meli	46.58
2024	Chituru Ali	6.57	not held		Edoardo Scotti	46.57
2025	Yassin Bandaogo	6.69	not held		Luca Sito	46.15
2026	Filippo Randazzo	6.61	not held		Matteo Raimondi	47.10

=== 800 m, 1500 m, 3000 m ===
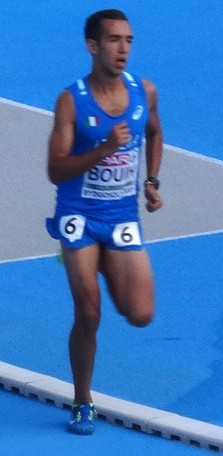
Yassin Bouih, author of three doublets (1500 m / 3000 m) in 2017, 2018 and 2020.

Year	800 metres		1500 metres		3000 metres	
1970	Dario Bonetti	1:51.8	Roberto Gervasini	3:50.2	Franco Arese	8:02.0
1971	Dario Bonetti (2)	1:58.2	Gianni Del Buono	3:41.9	Giuseppe Cindolo	7:59.4
1972	Claudio Baratto	1:53.5	Franco Arese	3:46.6	Gianni Del Buono	8:01.8
1973	Vittorio Fontanella	1:54.1	Adelio Diamante	3:48.8	Gianni Del Buono (2)	7:58.2
1974	Philippe Meyer (FRA)	1:49.9	Carlo Grippo	3:53.7	Franco Fava	7:59.6
1975	Marcello Fiasconaro	1:49.9	Roberto Gervasini (2)	3:50.8	Aldo Tomasini	8:00.6
1976	Keith Francis (USA)	1:49.97	Barry Smith (GBR)	3:43.16	Fernando Cerrada (ESP)	7:57.66
1977	Carlo Grippo	1:46.37	Adelio Diamante (2)	3:48.41	Giuseppe Gerbi	8:06.29
1978	Gabriele Ferrero	1:49.8a	Federico Leporati	3:55.1a	Venanzio Ortis	7:53.1a
1979	Carlo Grippo (2)	1:51.2	Claudio Patrignani	3:46.1	Franco Fava (2)	8:02.9
1980	Colomán Trabado (ESP)	1:49.3a	Federico Leporati (2)	3:44.0a	Fulvio Costa	7:58.9a
1981	Adorno Corradini	1:51.73	Gianni Truschi	3:47.27	Alberto Cova	7:57.90
1982	Gianni Rizzioli	1:51.76	Fulvio Costa	3:44.85	Alberto Cova (2)	7:53.52
1983	Claudio Castanini	1:53.70	Claudio Patrignani (2)	3:49.07	Mariano Scartezzini	8:06.36
1984	Massimo Martelli	1:51.32	Riccardo Materazzi	3:42.30	Alberto Cova (3)	7:53.75
1985	Alberto Barsotti	1:50.67	Riccardo Materazzi (2)	3:44.39	Stefano Mei	7:48.88
1986	Tonino Viali	1:50.32	Claudio Patrignani (3)	3:44.95	Stefano Mei (2)	8:03.44
1987	Tonino Viali (2)	1:49.23	Luca Vandi	3:44.39	Franco Boffi	8:02.20
1988	Tonino Viali (3)	1:48.49	Luca Vandi (2)	3:48.15	Mauro Pregnolato	8:01.16
1989	Gianni Bruzzi	1:49.13	Tonino Viali	3:46.63	Stefano Mei (3)	7:54.28
1990	Simone Modugno	1:49.94	Davide Tirelli	3:48.75	Angelo Carosi	7:55.39
1991	Andrea Benvenuti	1:50.47	Davide Tirelli (2)	3:49.89	Alessandro Lambruschini	8:30.87
1992	Tonino Viali (4)	1:49.42	Amos Rota	3:40.00	Alessandro Lambruschini (2)	7:59.03
1993	Giuseppe D'Urso	1:48.09	Amos Rota (2)	3:44.40	Fabio Olivo	8:02.34
1994	Simone Modugno (2)	1:50.63	Massimo Pegoretti	3:45.51	Gianni Bruzzi	8:07.79
1995	Marco Chiavarini	1:49.06	Andrea Abelli	3:49.77	Gianni Crepaldi	7:55.80
1996	Giuseppe D'Urso (2)	1:49.57	Andrea Giocondi	3:46.86	Luciano Di Pardo	8:03.36
1997	Andrea Longo	1:49.41	Giuseppe D'Urso	3:37.5	Gennaro Di Napoli	7:43.10
1998	Davide Cadoni	1:49.48	Giuseppe D'Urso (2)	3:39.73	Moses Kiptanui (KEN)	7:46.89
1999	Andrea Giocondi	1:49.93	Salvatore Vincenti	3:44.72	Gennaro Di Napoli (2)	7:49.09
2000	Giuseppe D'Urso (3)	1:50.31	Abdallah Abdelhak	3:46.05	Gennaro Di Napoli (3)	7:51.3
2001	Davide Cadoni (2)	1:48.93	Christian Obrist	3:42.85	Salvatore Vincenti	7:56.43
2002	Livio Sciandra	1:47.62	Lorenzo Lazzari	3:43.94	Abdallah Abdelhak	7:54.59
2003	Christian Neunhauserer	1:49.05	Salvatore Vincenti (2)	3:47.03	Lorenzo Perrone	7:50.44
2004	Christian Neunhauserer (2)	1:49.88	Andrea Longo	3:43.31	Salvatore Vincenti (2)	7:59.39
2005	Maurizio Bobbato	1:49.56	Andrea Longo (2)	3:41.79	Cosimo Caliandro	7:58.94
2006	Maurizio Bobbato (2)	1:51.76	Christian Obrist (2)	3:47.67	Cosimo Caliandro (2)	8:05.05
2007	Maurizio Bobbato (3)	1:51.90	Maurizio Bobbato	3:47.38	Najibe Salami	8:06.34
2008	Livio Sciandra	1:48.47	Christian Obrist (3)	3:42.39	Daniele Meucci	7:56.53
2009	Lukas Rifesser	1:52.51	Christian Obrist (4)	3:41.03	Daniele Meucci (2)	8:03.48
2010	Giordano Benedetti	1:48.65	Mario Scapini	3:45.38	Christian Obrist	8:09.76
2011	Giordano Benedetti (2)	1:52.19	Najibe Salami	3:44.09	Simone Gariboldi	8:08.68
2012	Giordano Benedetti (3)	1:50.82	Merihun Crespi	3:44.79	Abdellah Haidane	8:11.71
2013	Giordano Benedetti (4)	1:48.11	Najibe Salami (2)	3:49.96	Abdellah Haidane (2)	8:00.97
2014	Giordano Benedetti (5)	1:50.25	Abdellah Haidane	3:44.26	Abdellah Haidane (3)	7:56.80
2015	Joao Bussotti	1:50.68	Joao Bussotti	3:54.25	Said El Otmani	8:06.27
2016	Gabriele Bizzotto	1:51.14	Mohad Abdikadar Sheik Ali	3:44.68	Yemaneberhan Crippa	7:57.25
2017	Simone Barontini	1:49.40	Yassin Bouih	3:48.22	Yassin Bouih	8:08.52
2018	Simone Barontini (2)	1:49.99	Yassin Bouih (2)	3:44.19	Yassin Bouih (2)	8:17.99
2019	Simone Barontini (3)	1:48.62	Enrico Riccobon	3:44.97	Ossama Meslek	8:15.24
2020	Simone Barontini (4)	1:48.41	Yassin Bouih (3)	3:40.73	Yassin Bouih (3)	8:24.75
2021	Simone Barontini (5)	1:47.51	Pietro Arese	3:40.54	Pietro Arese	8:04.03
2022	Catalin Tecuceanu	1:48.08	Nesim Amsellek	3:39.87	Federico Riva	8:28.80
2023	Catalin Tecuceanu	1:45.99	Pietro Arese	3:48.07	Ossama Meslek	7:52.90

=== 60 m hs, high jump, pole vault ===
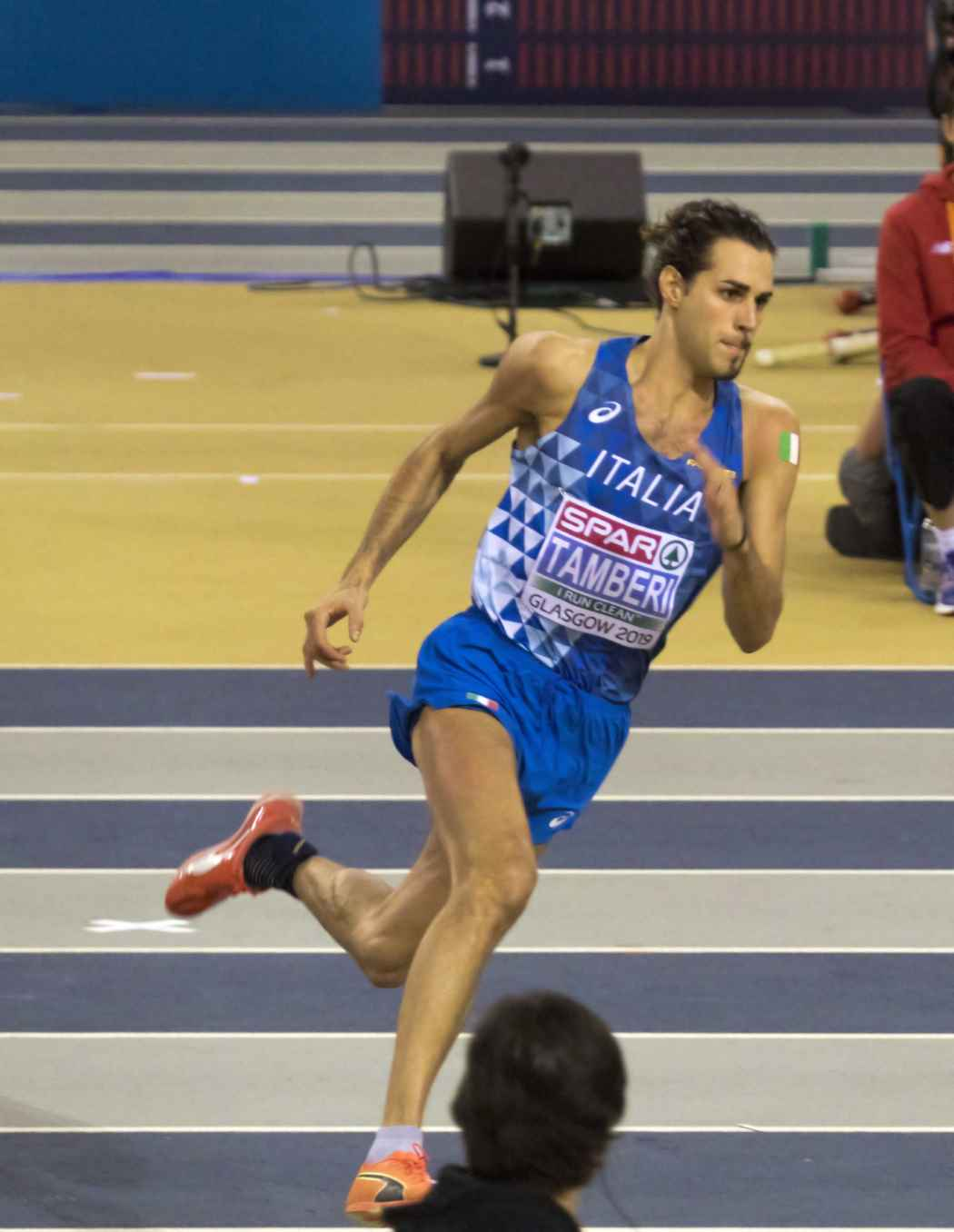
Gimbo Tamberi, three victories in the high jump until 2021.

Year	60 metres hs		High jump		Pole vault	
1970	Sergio Liani	7.9	Erminio Azzaro	2.11	Aldo Righi	4.70
1971	Sergio Liani (2)	8.0	Erminio Azzaro (2)	2.14	Renato Dionisi	5.00
1972	Marco Acerbi	8.0	Gian Marco Schivo	2.14	Silvio Fraquelli	4.80
1973	Giuseppe Buttari	7.8	Enzo Del Forno	2.13	Renato Dionisi (2)	5.00
1974	Charles Foster (USA)	7.73	Enzo Del Forno (2)	2.20	Antti Kalliomäki (FIN)	5.35
1975	Giuseppe Buttari (2)	7.87	Janusz Wrzosek (POL)	2.14	Claudio Di Addezio	4.80
1976	Willie Davenport (USA)	7.89	Francisco Martín Morillas (ESP)	2.21	Romuald Murawski (POL)	5.20
1977	Gianni Ronconi	7.99	Guy Moreau (BEL)	2.18	Kjell Isaksson (SWE)	5.20
1978	Giuseppe Buttari (3)	7.97	Massimo Di Giorgio	2.22	Domenico D'Alisera	5.00
1979	Sergio Liani (3)	8.07	Massimo Di Giorgio (2)	2.23	Domenico D'Alisera (2)	5.00
1980	Giuseppe Buttari (4)	7.80	Marco Tamberi	2.25	Domenico D'Alisera (3)	5.20
1981	Marco Braccini	7.98	Danial Temim (YUG)	2.21	Miro Zalar (SWE)	5.47
1982	Daniele Fontecchio	7.88	Massimo Di Giorgio (3)	2.24	Mauro Barella	5.30
1983	Daniele Fontecchio (2)	7.94	Massimo Di Giorgio (4)	2.23	Vincenzo Bellone	5.00
1984	Daniele Fontecchio (3)	7.87	Gianni Davito	2.23	Mauro Barella (2)	5.35
1985	Daniele Fontecchio (4)	7.81	Giampiero Palomba	2.23	Marco Andreini	5.30
1986	Luigi Bertocchi	7.89	Gianni Davito (2)	2.23	Marco Andreini (2)	5.40
1987	Luigi Bertocchi (2)	7.80	Carlo Thränhardt (FRG)	2.24	Gianni Stecchi	5.30
1988	Gianni Tozzi	7.39y	Daniele Pagani	2.26	Enzo Brichese	5.50
1989	Gianni Tozzi (2)	7.82	Marcello Benvenuti	2.21	Enzo Brichese (2)	5.50
1990	Marco Todeschini	7.85	Gianni Davito (3)	2.21	Andrea Pegoraro	5.50
1991	Laurent Ottoz	7.81	Gianni Davito (4)	2.21	Gianni Iapichino	5.30
1992	Marco Todeschini (2)	7.86	Luca Toso	2.24	Massimo Allevi	5.50
1993	Laurent Ottoz (2)	7.87	Roberto Ferrari	2.28	Andrea Pegoraro (2)	5.62
1994	Laurent Ottoz (3)	7.65	Fabrizio Borellini	2.18	Gianni Iapichino (2)	5.60
1995	Andrea Putignani	7.81	Ettore Ceresoli	2.27	Gianni Iapichino (3)	5.50
1996	Mauro Rossi	7.87	Luca Zampieri	2.22	Maurilio Mauro Mariani	5.60
1997	Mauro Rossi (2)	7.66	Alessandro Canale	2.22	Okkert Brits (RSA)	5.60
1998	Mauro Rossi (3)	7.67	Ettore Ceresoli (2)	2.24	Fabio Pizzolato	5.70
1999	Emiliano Pizzoli	7.69	Giulio Ciotti	2.24	Maurilio Mauro Mariani (2)	5.40
2000	Emiliano Pizzoli (2)	7.72	Ivan Bernasconi	2.24	Massimo Allevi (2)	5.40
2001	Emiliano Pizzoli (3)	7.68	Giulio Ciotti (2)	2.24	Giuseppe Gibilisco	5.40
2002	Luca Giovannelli	7.84	Nicola Ciotti	2.30	Giuseppe Gibilisco (2)	5.50
2003	Emiliano Pizzoli (4)	7.87	Andrea Bettinelli	2.28	Maurilio Mauro Mariani (3)	5.40
2004	Emiliano Pizzoli (5)	7.88	Andrea Bettinelli (2)	2.24	Giuseppe Gibilisco (3)	5.40
2005	Andrea Giaconi	7.77	Nicola Ciotti (2)	2.28	Giorgio Piantella	5.30
2006	Andrea Giaconi (2)	7.79	Nicola Ciotti (3)	2.25	Matteo Rubbiani	5.30
2007	Emiliano Pizzoli (6)	7.88	Andrea Bettinelli (3)	2.29	Giorgio Piantella (2)	5.50
2008	Emanuele Abate	7.89	Filippo Campioli	2.26	Matteo Rubbiani (2)	5.30
2009	Emanuele Abate (2)	7.83	Nicola Ciotti (4)	2.27	Giorgio Piantella (3)	5.50
2010	John Mark Nalocca	7.93	Giulio Ciotti (3)	2.24	Giorgio Piantella (4)	5.40
2011	Emanuele Abate (3)	7.83	Nicola Ciotti (5)	2.25	Giorgio Piantella (5)	5.55
2012	Paolo Dal Molin	7.75	Silvano Chesani	2.31	Claudio Stecchi	5.60
2013	Stefano Tedesco	7.87	Silvano Chesani (2)	2.33	Giorgio Piantella (6)	5.50
2014	Paolo Dal Molin (2)	7.60	Marco Fassinotti	2.34	Alessandro Sinno	5.35
2015	Hassane Fofana	7.80	Silvano Chesani (3)	2.29	Marco Boni	5.40
2016	Lorenzo Perini	7.76	Gianmarco Tamberi	2.35	Alessandro Sinno (2)	5.35
2017	Hassane Fofana (2)	7.73	Silvano Chesani (4)	2.25	Giorgio Piantella (7)	5.40
2018	Hassane Fofana (3)	7.66	Stefano Sottile	2.24	Claudio Stecchi (2)	5.55
2019	Lorenzo Perini (2)	7.75	Gianmarco Tamberi (2)	2.32	Alessandro Sinno (3)	5.40
2020	Lorenzo Perini (3)	7.72	Marco Fassinotti (2)	2.20	Max Mandusic	5.45
2021	Franck Koua	7.78	Gianmarco Tamberi (3)	2.35	Max Mandusic (2)	5.52
2022	Paolo Dal Molin (3)	7.62	Christian Falocchi	2.21	Matteo Oliveri	5.37
2023	Lorenzo Simonelli	7.66	Stefano Sottile	2.26	Matteo Oliveri (2)	5.43

=== Long jump, triple jump, shot put ===
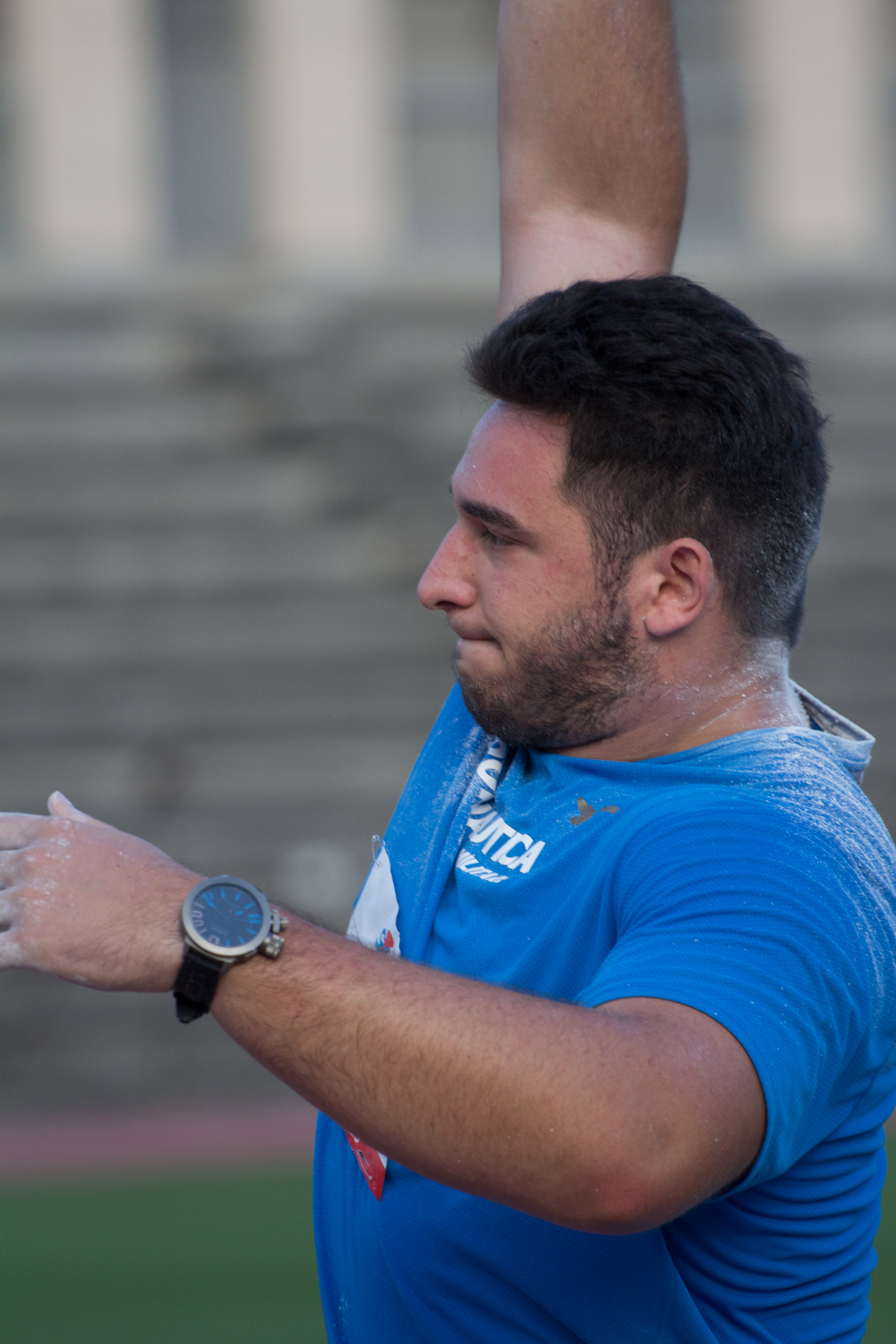
Leonardo Fabbri, four consecutive victories in the shot put until 2021.

Year	Long jump		Triple jump		Shot put	
1970	Elio Lazzarotti	7.51	Norberto Capiferri	15.41	Renato Bergonzoni	17.08
1971	Carlo Arrighi	7.36	Ezio Buzzelli	15.38	Renato Bergonzoni (2)	17.62
1972	Alberto Albero	7.52	Ezio Buzzelli (2)	15.37	Renato Bergonzoni	17.78
1973	Carlo Arrighi (2)	7.47	Ezio Buzzelli (3)	15.48	Marco Montelatici	17.36
1974	Maurizio Siega	7.59	Christian Valétudié (FRA)	15.92	Michele Sorrenti	18.16
1975	Alberto Albero (2)	7.41	Ezio Buzzelli (4)	15.80	Lukas Vassilios (GRE)	18.75
1976	Alberto Albero (3)	7.84	Christian Valétudié (FRA)	16.69	Angelo Groppelli	18.05
1977	Carlo Arrighi (3)	7.62	Christian Valétudié (FRA)	16.04	Marco Montelatici (2)	19.10
1978	Carlo Arrighi (4)	7.64	Paolo Piapan	16.16	Marco Montelatici (3)	20.00
1979	Mario Lega	7.59	Paolo Piapan (2)	16.20	Angelo Groppelli (3)	18.72
1980	Marco Piochi	7.65	Antonio Corgos (ESP)	16.33	Angelo Groppelli (4)	19.77
1981	Roberto Veglia	7.55	Johan Brink (SWE)	16.21	Brian Oldfield (USA)	20.64
1982	Giovanni Evangelisti	7.67	Roberto Mazzucato	16.29	Luigi Sintoni	19.55
1983	Renato Furlani	7.54	Roberto Mazzucato (2)	16.33	Fernando Baroni	18.11
1984	Giovanni Evangelisti (2)	8.05	Dario Badinelli	16.40	Marco Montelatici (4)	19.33
1985	Mario Lega (2)	7.56	Dario Badinelli (2)	16.56	Alessandro Andrei	20.81
1986	Claudio Cherubini	7.69	Roberto Mazzucato (3)	16.01	Marco Montelatici (5)	20.65
1987	Giovanni Evangelisti (3)	7.84	John Herbert (GBR)	16.26	Fernando Baroni (2)	19.48
1988	Giuseppe Bertozzi	7.82	Dario Badinelli (2)	16.93	Leonardo Lazzeri	17.96
1989	Giuseppe Bertozzi (2)	7.45	Dario Badinelli (3)	16.46	Giorgio Venturi	18.08
1990	Giuseppe Bertozzi (3)	7.82	Dario Badinelli (4)	16.16	Alessandro Andrei (2)	19.51
1991	Giancarlo Biscarini	7.49	Dario Badinelli (5)	16.62	Alessandro Andrei (3)	19.14
1992	Giovanni Evangelisti (4)	7.92	Dario Badinelli (6)	16.42	Alessandro Andrei (4)	19.55
1993	Fausto Frigerio	7.62	Daniele Buttiglione	16.40	Paolo Dal Soglio	20.30
1994	Giovanni Evangelisti (5)	7.86	Daniele Buttiglione (2)	16.30	Paolo Dal Soglio (2)	19.52
1995	Roberto Coltri	7.72	Daniele Buttiglione (3)	16.46	Corrado Fantini	19.33
1996	Milko Campus	7.88	Paolo Camossi	16.27	Paolo Dal Soglio (3)	20.70
1997	Simone Bianchi	7.97	Natale Monopoli	16.49	Paolo Dal Soglio (4)	20.47
1998	Nicola Trentin	7.84	Fabrizio Donato	16.34	Paolo Dal Soglio (5)	20.36
1999	Fabrizio Donato	7.60	Fabrizio Donato (2)	16.66	Paolo Dal Soglio (6)	20.37
2000	Marco Tremigliozzi	7.75	Paolo Camossi (2)	16.90	Paolo Dal Soglio (7)	20.08
2001	Alessio Rimoldi	7.89	Fabrizio Donato (3)	16.94	Paolo Dal Soglio (8)	20.46
2002	Diego Boschiero	7.62	Fabrizio Donato (4)	17.03	Paolo Dal Soglio (9)	20.62
2003	Nicola Trentin (2)	7.71	Fabrizio Donato (5)	16.38	Paolo Dal Soglio (10)	20.06
2004	Nicola Trentin (3)	7.96	Fabrizio Donato (6)	16.69	Paolo Dal Soglio (11)	19.47
2005	Milko Campus (2)	7.70	Salvatore Morello	16.65	Marco Dodoni	19.72
2006	Andrew Howe	8.10	Fabrizio Donato (7)	17.24	Marco Dodoni (2)	19.28
2007	Andrew Howe (2)	8.15	Fabrizio Donato (8)	16.93	Marco Di Maggio	19.20
2008	Ferdinando Iucolano	7.83	Fabrizio Donato (9)	17.06	Paolo Dal Soglio (12)	18.61
2009	Stefano Tremigliozzi	7.86	Fabrizio Donato (10)	17.42	Paolo Dal Soglio (13)	19.20
2010	Stefano Tremigliozzi (2)	7.65	Fabrizio Donato (11)	17.39	Marco Di Maggio (2)	18.47
2011	Fabrizio Donato (2)	8.03	Fabrizio Schembri	17.00	Marco Di Maggio (3)	18.41
2012	Fabrizio Donato (3)	7.95	Andrea Chiari	16.85	Paolo Dal Soglio (14)	18.78
2013	Stefano Tremigliozzi (3)	7.95	Michele Boni	16.55	Marco Dodoni (3)	18.31
2014	Stefano Tremigliozzi (4)	8.06	Fabrizio Schembri (2)	16.78	Daniele Secci	18.64
2015	Emanuele Catania	7.72	Fabrizio Schembri (3)	16.58	Daniele Secci (2)	19.56
2016	Stefano Tremigliozzi (5)	7.84	Fabrizio Schembri (4)	16.82	Daniele Secci (3)	19.35
2017	Marcell Jacobs	8.06	Daniele Cavazzani	16.49	Sebastiano Bianchetti	19.19
2018	Antonino Trio	7.88	Fabrizio Donato (12)	16.94	Leonardo Fabbri	19.17
2019	Kevin Ojiaku	7.87	Simone Forte	16.76	Leonardo Fabbri (2)	20.69
2020	Gabriele Chilà	8.00	Edoardo Accetta	16.62	Leonardo Fabbri (3)	21.45
2021	Antonino Trio (2)	7.94	Tobia Bocchi	16.79	Leonardo Fabbri (4)	20.36
2022	Filippo Randazzo	8.00	Simone Biasutti	16.23	Nick Ponzio	21.34
2023	Filippo Randazzo (2)	7.68	Tobia Bocchi (2)	16.86	Leonardo Fabbri (5)	21.60

=== Heptathlon, 5000 m walk, relays ===
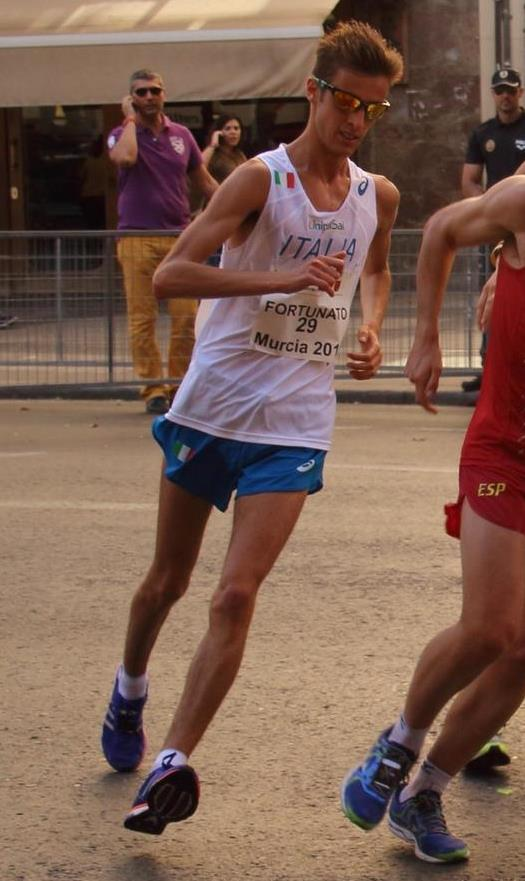
Francesco Fortunato, five consecutive victories in the race walk until 2020.

Year	Heptathlon		5000 metres walk		Relay race
1970	not held		Vittorio Visini	8:02.8	Lilion Snia
1971	not held		Vittorio Visini (2)	8:07.0	Giglio Rosso Firenze
1972	not held		Vittorio Visini (3)	12:40.4	Cus Torino
1973	Gianni Modena	3765	Vittorio Visini (4)	12:26.8	Fiat Torino (2)
1974	Gianni Modena (2)	3593	Vittorio Visini (5)	12:03.0	Fiamme gialle
1975	Gianni Modena (3)	3665	Vittorio Visini (6)	11:59.4	Fiamme oro
1976	Gianni Modena (4)	3679	Vittorio Visini (7)	11:55.22	Fiamme gialle (2)
1977	Gianni Modena (5)	3568	Renato Di Nicola	12:13.98	Iveco Torino (3)
1978	not held		Vittorio Visini (8)	11:43.3	Fiamme oro (2)
1979	Luigino Rossi	3661	Carlo Mattioli	11:35.1	Pro Patria Milano
1980	Daniele Faraggiana	5322	Carlo Mattioli (2)	18:59.2	Snia Milano (2)
1981	Eugenio Mares	5283	Alessandro Pezzatini	11:42.70	Pro Patria Milano (2)
1982	Marco Rossi	5215	Alessandro Pezzatini (2)	19:33.30	Esercito
1983	Gianni Modena (6)	4963	Alessandro Pezzatini (3)	20:10.91	Pro Patria Milano (3)
1984	Marco Rossi (2)	5390	Maurizio Damilano	19:07.96	Fiamme oro (3)
1985	Ottavio Curto	5103	Carlo Mattioli (3)	19:51.55	not held
1986	Marco Rossi (3)	5508	Carlo Mattioli (4)	19:34.87	not held
1987	Marco Baffi (4)	5362	Carlo Mattioli (5)	19:12.94	not held
1988	Gianni Iapichino	5396	Giovanni De Benedictis	19:21.2	not held
1989	Marco Rossi (5)	6442	Giovanni De Benedictis (2)	19:22.14	not held
1990	Marco Baffi	5392	Giovanni De Benedictis (3)	19:34.76	not held
1991	Luciano Asta	5185	Giovanni De Benedictis (4)	18:51.94	not held
1992	Marco Baffi (2)	5586	Giovanni De Benedictis (5)	19:07.68	not held
1993	Luciano Asta (2)	5453	Giovanni De Benedictis (6)	19:17.30	not held
1994	Luciano Asta (3)	5652	Giovanni De Benedictis (7)	19:07.83	not held
1995	Luciano Asta (4)	5655	not held		not held
1996	Beniamino Poserina	5833	Giovanni De Benedictis (8)	18:55.68	not held
1997	Stefano Cellario	5664	Giovanni De Benedictis (9)	19:10.91	not held
1998	Beniamino Poserina (2)	5840	Giovanni De Benedictis (10)	18:55.32	Fiamme gialle (3)
1999	Beniamino Poserina (3)	5435	Massimo Fizialetti	18:57.52	Fiamme oro (4)
2000	Luciano Asta (5)	5666	Alessandro Gandellini	18:27.15	Fiamme azzurre
2001	Paolo Casarsa	5564	Ivano Brugnetti	19:00.12	Aeronautica
2002	Cristian Gasparro	5893	Alessandro Gandellini (2)	19:08.57	Aeronautica (2)
2003	Cristian Gasparro (2)	5557	Alessandro Gandellini (3)	18:39.19	Fiamme oro (5)
2004	Cristian Gasparro (3)	5612	Alessandro Gandellini (4)	18:34.15	Fiamme gialle (4)
2005	Marzio Viti	5599	Alessandro Gandellini (5)	19:03.38	Carabinieri
2006	Luca Ceglie	5565	Giorgio Rubino	19:33.74	Atletica Macerata
2007	Luca Ceglie (2)	5711	Ivano Brugnetti	18:08.86	Aeronautica (3)
2008	Franco Casiean	5404	Ivano Brugnetti (2)	18:33.06	Atletica Pavia
2009	William Frullani	5950	Ivano Brugnetti (3)	18:23.47	Atletica Riccardi
2010	Riccardo Palmieri	5402	Alex Schwazer	18:46.49	Aeronautica (4)
2011	Franco Casiean (2)	5463	Riccardo Macchia	20:09.99	Aeronautica (5)
2012	Franco Casiean (3)	5220	Giorgio Rubino (2)	19:22.80	Fiamme gialle (5)
2013	Michele Calvi	5590	Giorgio Rubino (3)	19:32.51	Fiamme gialle (6)
2014	Simone Cairoli	5334	Matteo Giupponi	19:51.07	Fiamme gialle (7)
2015	Simone Cairoli (2)	5683	Leonardo Dei Tos	19:16.34	Fiamme gialle (8)
2016	Vincenzo Vigliotti	5525	Francesco Fortunato	19:12.00	Atletica Riccardi (2)
2017	Simone Cairoli (3)	5760	Francesco Fortunato (2)	18:59.06	Fiamme gialle (9)
2018	Simone Cairoli (4)	5517	Francesco Fortunato (3)	18:55.26	Fiamme gialle (10)
2019	Simone Cairoli (5)	5752	Francesco Fortunato (4)	18:47.63	Fiamme gialle (11)
2020	Simone Cairoli (6)	5939	Francesco Fortunato (5)	18:50.22	Athletic Club 96 Alperia
2021	Dario Dester	6076	Federico Tontodonati	19:33.71	Pro Patria Milano (4)
2022	Dario Dester (2)	6038	Teodorico Caporaso	19:56.15	Atletica Biotekna
2023	Lorenzo Naidon	5714	Francesco Fortunato (6)	18:37.63	CUS Pro Patria Milano (5)

== Women ==
=== 60 m, 200 m, 400 m ===
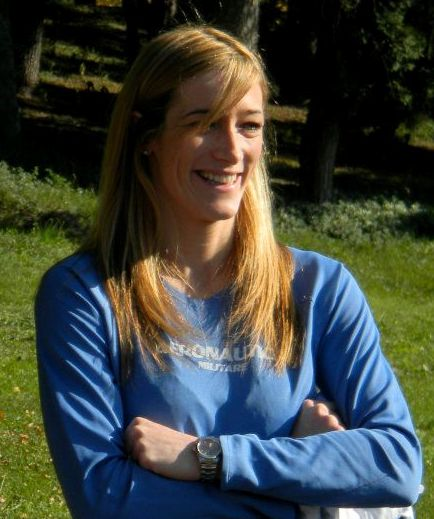
Manuela Levorato, seven victories in 60 m and three in 200 m from 1998 to 2011.

Year	60 metres		200 metres		400 metres	
1970	Cecilia Molinari	7.5	not held		Donata Govoni	56.4
1971	Cecilia Molinari (2)	7.7	Alessandra Orselli	25.4	Silvia Chersoni	56.8
1972	Cecilia Molinari (3)	7.3	not held		Alessandra Orselli	56.3
1973	Cecilia Molinari (4)	7.4	not held		Donata Govoni (2)	56.4
1974	Mona-Lisa Pursiainen (FIN)	7.2	not held		Danila Paredi	58.5
1975	Rita Bottiglieri	7.48	not held		Alessandra Orselli (2)	56.5
1976	Mona-Lisa Pursiainen (FIN)	7.47	not held		Giuseppina Cirulli	56.66
1977	Linda Haglund (SWE)	7.35	not held		Marita Koch (GDR)	51.57
1978	Rita Bottiglieri (2)	7.47	not held		Daniela Porcelli	56.78
1979	Marisa Masullo	7.58	not held		Giuliana Bargioni	56.7
1980	Laura Miano	7.48	Marisa Masullo	24.06	Erica Rossi	54.45
1981	Marisa Masullo (2)	7.38	not held		Erica Rossi (2)	54.28
1982	Antonella Capriotti	7.57	Erica Rossi	24.39	Morena Pistrino	56.14
1983	Marisa Masullo (3)	7.23	Erica Rossi (2)	24.13	Patrizia Lombardo	55.07
1984	Laura Miano (2)	7.46	Marisa Masullo (2)	23.71	Erica Rossi (3)	53.74
1985	Marisa Masullo (4)	7.38	Daniela Ferrian	24.01	Erica Rossi (4)	53.63
1986	Daniela Ferrian	7.42	Rossella Tarolo	24.43	Erica Rossi (5)	55.69
1987	Daniela Ferrian (2)	7.43	Daniela Ferrian (2)	23.79	Cosetta Campana	54.52
1988	Roberta Rabaioli	6.97y	Marisa Masullo (3)	24.62	Erica Rossi (6)	55.06
1989	Sonia Vigati	7.43	Cristina Picchi	24.00	Carla Barbarino	55.36
1990	Sonia Vigati (2)	7.48	Donatella Dal Bianco	23.46	Irmgard Trojer	54.12
1991	Marisa Masullo (5)	7.47	Daniela Ferrian (3)	24.02	Maria Vincenza Marasco	55.08
1992	Lara Sinico	7.38	Donatella Dal Bianco (2)	23.73	Irmgard Trojer (2)	53.44
1993	Marisa Masullo (5)	7.46	Daniela Ferrian (4)	23.94	Francesca Carbone	54.30
1994	Lara Sinico (2)	7.37	Giada Gallina	24.02	Patrizia Spuri	54.80
1995	Lara Sinico (3)	7.53	Donatella Dal Bianco (3)	23.83	Francesca Carbone (2)	53.96
1996	Carla Tuzzi	7.43	Virna De Angeli	23.62	Carla Barbarino (2)	53.91
1997	Giada Gallina	7.44	Virna De Angeli (2)	23.39	Fabiola Piroddi	54.65
1998	Manuela Levorato	7.33	Annarita Luciano	23.84	Patrizia Spuri (2)	53.59
1999	Manuela Levorato (2)	7.30	Angela Atede (NGR)	24.03	Virna De Angeli	53.30
2000	Manuela Levorato (3)	7.32	Daniela Graglia	23.97	Francesca Carbone (3)	53.01
2001	Manuela Grillo	7.41	Daniela Graglia (2)	23.67	Olabisi Afolabi (NGR)	52.69
2002	Manuela Levorato (4)	7.33	Manuela Levorato	23.65	Danielle Perpoli	53.90
2003	Manuela Levorato (5)	7.26	Manuela Levorato (2)	23.14	Olabisi Afolabi (NGR)	52.93
2004	Manuela Levorato (6)	7.22	Manuela Levorato (3)	23.54	Monika Niederstätter	53.67
2005	Daniela Graglia	7.42	Daniela Graglia (3)	24.15	Monika Niederstätter (2)	54.66
2006	Manuela Grillo	7.45	not held		Daniela Reina	54.13
2007	Daniela Graglia (2)	7.31	not held		Daniela Reina (2)	53.11
2008	Vincenza Calì	7.34	not held		Daniela Reina (3)	53.75
2009	Anita Pistone	7.33	not held		Daniela Reina (4)	53.19
2010	Maria Aurora Salvagno	7.37	not held		Marta Milani	53.54
2011	Manuela Levorato (7)	7.44	not held		Marta Milani (2)	53.09
2012	Audrey Alloh	7.39	not held		Maria Enrica Spacca	53.00
2013	Audrey Alloh (2)	7.37	not held		Chiara Bazzoni	53.78
2014	Audrey Alloh (3)	7.34	not held		Chiara Bazzoni (2)	53.44
2015	Audrey Alloh (4)	7.34	not held		Chiara Bazzoni (3)	53.51
2016	Ilenia Draisci	7.40	not held		Ayomide Folorunso	53.16
2017	Anna Bongiorni	7.30	not held		Ayomide Folorunso (2)	53.38
2018	Anna Bongiorni (2)	7.27	not held		Raphaela Lukudo	53.08
2019	Johanelis Herrera	7.32	not held		Raphaela Lukudo (2)	53.13
2020	Irene Siragusa	7.34	not held		Ayomide Folorunso (3)	52.82
2021	Vittoria Fontana	7.35	not held		Rebecca Borga	52.69
2022	Zaynab Dosso	7.17 NR	not held		Eleonora Marchiando	53.52

=== 800 m, 1500 m, 3000 m ===
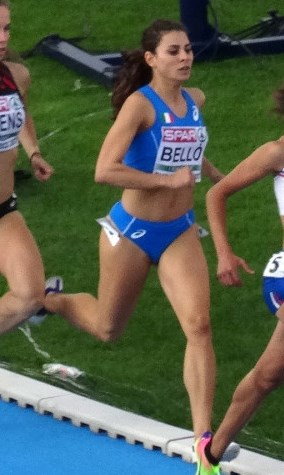
Elena Bellò, four consecutive victories in the 800 m until 2021.

Year	800 metres		1500 metres		3000 metres	
1970	Angela Ramello	2:16.4	not held		not held	
1971	Donata Govoni	2:09.2	not held		not held	
1972	Donata Govoni	2:09.7	Giuseppina Torello	4:42.2	not held	
1973	Zina Boniolo	2:14.8	Giuseppina Torello	4:29.9	not held	
1974	Daniela Gregorutti	2:13.7	Margherita Gargano	4:27.3	not held	
1975	Angela Ramello	2:14.6	Margherita Gargano	4:23.6	not held	
1976	Nikolina Shtereva (BUL)	2:03.75	Margherita Gargano	4:22.58	not held	
1977	Christine Neumann (GDR)	2:08.02	Fiorita Tormena	4:33.65	not held	
1978	Gabriella Dorio	2:06.4a	Silvana Cruciata	4:18.8a	not held	
1979	Gabriella Dorio	2:04.7	Agnese Possamai	4:18.5	not held	
1980	Renata Capitanio	2:10.9a	Agnese Possamai	4:18.7a	not held	
1981	Renata Capitanio	2:12.51	Agnese Possamai	4:16.77		
1982	Rossella Gramola	2:07.33	Gabriella Dorio	4:07.61	Agnese Possamai	9:01.23
1983	Antonella Capurro	2:11.40	Gabriella Dorio	4:15.21	Agnese Possamai	9:12.24
1984	Simonetta Callegari	2:12.51	Agnese Possamai	4:06.83	Agnese Possamai	9:02.59
1985	Giuseppina Cirulli	2:08.19	Sonia Crespiatico	4:29.23	not held	
1986	Patrizia Gini	2:12.63	Agnese Possamai	4:23.77	not held	
1987	Magda Maiocchi	2:06.18	Valentina Tauceri	4:26.92	not held	
1988	Manuela Enrietto	2:11.06	Valentina Tauceri	4:18.13	not held	
1989	Rossana Morabito	2:06.68	not held		not held	
1990	Rossana Morabito	2:05.90	Elisa Rea	4:15.92	not held	
1991	Nadia Falvo	2:09.47	Marzia Gazzetta	4:22.14	not held	
1992	Nadia Falvo	2:03.80	Elisa Rea	4:16.33	not held	
1993	Nicoletta Tozzi	2:03.17	Elisa Rea	4:15.80	not held	
1994	Nicoletta Tozzi	2:07.43	Elisa Vagnini	4:22.62	not held	
1995	Eleonora Berlanda	2:08.14	Elisa Vagnini	4:24.66	Elisa Rea	9:15.50
1996	Stefania Savi	2:09.12	Elisa Rea	4:21.59	Jocelyne Farruggia	9:26.95
1997	Claudia Salvarani	2:06.00	Serenella Sbrissa	4:22.04	Serenella Sbrissa	9:18.09
1998	Elisabetta Artuso	2:06.11	Elisa Rea	4:11.49	Elisa Rea	9:01.17
1999	Sara Palmas	2:08.25	Mara Cerini	4:27.56	Elisa Rea	9:23.26
2000	Patrizia Spuri	2:09.34	Sara Palmas	4:21.33	Silvia Sommaggio	8:59.18
2001	Sara Palmas (2)	2:08.72	Sara Palmas (2)	4:15.90	Michela Zanatta	9:16.07
2002	Elisabetta Artuso (2)	2:07.06	Sara Palmas (3)	4:19.37	Gloria Marconi	9:16.13
2003	Elisabetta Artuso (3)	2:05.34	Michela Zanatta	4:20.23	Michela Zanatta (2)	9:19.95
2004	Alexia Oberstolz	2:05.28	Michela Zanatta (2)	4:29.00	Michela Zanatta (3)	9:21.46
2005	Elisabetta Artuso (4)	2:04.78	Sara Palmas (4)	4:17.83	Silvia Weissteiner	9:07.11
2006	Alexia Oberstolz (2)	2:04.85	Elisa Cusma	4:17.17	Silvia Weissteiner (2)	8:59.75
2007	Elisa Cusma	2:04.39	Sara Palmas (5)	4:20.50	Silvia Weissteiner (3)	8:58.93
2008	Elisa Cusma (2)	2:08.53	Agnes Tschurtschenthaler	4:20.15	Silvia Weissteiner (4)	8:57.61
2009	Elisa Cusma (3)	2:04.83	Elisa Cusma (2)	4:19.16	Elena Romagnolo	8:54.14
2010	Elisa Cusma (4)	2:06.60	Elisa Cusma (3)	4:19.45	Federica Dal Ri	9:05.87
2011	Elisabetta Artuso (5)	2:11.54	Sara Palmas (6)	4:29.79	Silvia Weissteiner (5)	9:22.39
2012	Elisa Cusma (5)	2:04.97	Elisa Cusma (4)	4:17.79	Silvia Weissteiner (6)	9:01.35
2013	Elisa Cusma (6)	2:04.01	Margherita Magnani	4:14.54	Silvia Weissteiner (7)	9:03.29
2014	Marta Milani	2:05.39	Margherita Magnani (2)	4:11.98	Giulia Viola	9:12.70
2015	Elisa Cusma (7)	2:08.43	Giulia Viola	4:13.20	Giulia Viola (2)	8:56.23
2016	Marta Zenoni	2:03.88	Marta Zenoni	4:24.59	Valentina Costanza	9:24.12
2017	Irene Baldessari	2:04.30	Giulia Aprile	4:31.67	Giulia Viola (3)	9:04.18
2018	Elena Bellò	2:05.3	Margherita Magnani (3)	4:17.11	Margherita Magnani	9:15.90
2019	Elena Bellò (2)	2:05.58	Giulia Aprile (2)	4:18.13	Margherita Magnani (2)	9:01.32
2020	Elena Bellò (3)	2:06.46	Gaia Sabbatini	4:13.62	Elisa Bortoli	9:16.50
2021	Elena Bellò (4)	2:04.45	Gaia Sabbatini (2)	4:13.70	Giulia Aprile	9:09.26
2022	Gaia Sabbatini	2:01.07	Giulia Aprile (3)	4:18.51	Ludovica Cavalli	9:09.52

=== 60 m hs, high jump, pole vault ===
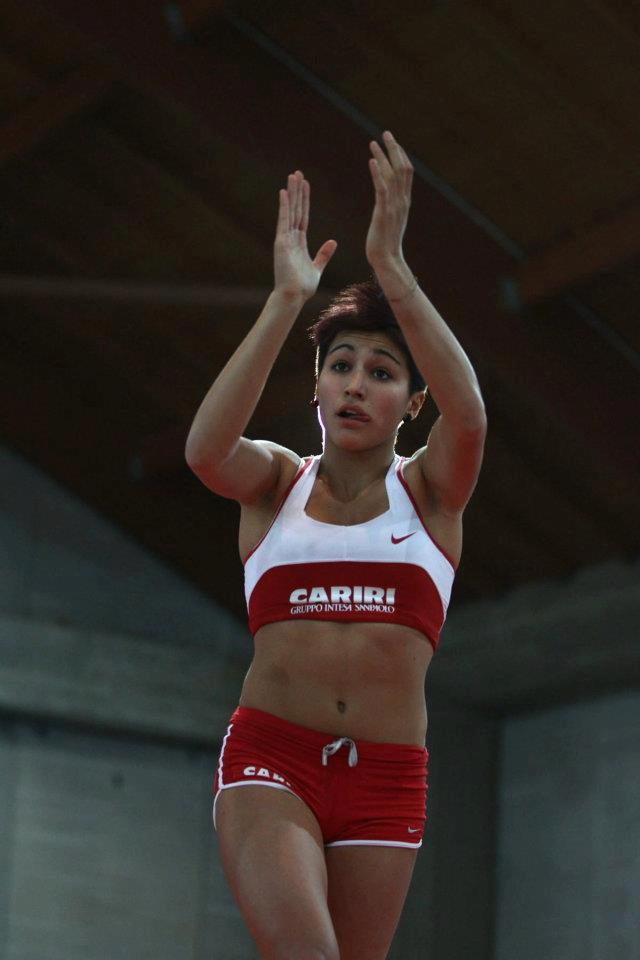
Roberta Bruni, four victories in the pole vault until 2021.

Year	60 metres hs		High jump		Pole vault	
1970	Paola Giuli	8.9	Sara Simeoni	1.64	not held	
1971	Ileana Ongar	8.9	Sara Simeoni	1.68	not held	
1972	Ileana Ongar	8.7	Isabella Pigato	1.68	not held	
1973	Antonella Battaglia	8.7	Sara Simeoni	1.81	not held	
1974	Meta Antenen (SUI)	8.1	Sara Simeoni	1.80	not held	
1975	Teresa Sukniewicz (POL)	8.70	Sara Simeoni	1.80	not held	
1976	Ileana Ongar	8.46	Susann Sundkvist (FIN)	1.87	not held	
1977	Ileana Ongar	8.60	Sara Simeoni	1.88	not held	
1978	Ileana Ongar	8.52	Sara Simeoni	1.95	not held	
1979	Carla Lunghi	8.60	Alessandra Fossati	1.86	not held	
1980	Patrizia Lombardo	8.38	Sara Simeoni	1.96	not held	
1981	Carla Lunghi	8.74	Sara Simeoni	1.91	not held	
1982	Laura Rosati	8.60	Sandra Dini	1.86	not held	
1983	Laura Rosati	8.60	Alessandra Fossati	1.81	not held	
1984	Simona Parmiggiani	8.49	Alessandra Fossati	1.82	not held	
1985	Mary Massarin	8.49	Sandra Dini	1.78	not held	
1986	Mary Massarin	8.44	Sara Simeoni	1.92	not held	
1987	Patrizia Lombardo	8.37	Stefka Kostadinova (BUL)	2.00	not held	
1988	Carla Tuzzi	7.71y	Michaela Tarantino	1.82	not held	
1989	Carla Tuzzi	8.37	Laura Biagi	1.84	not held	
1990	Carla Tuzzi	8.31	Anna Maria Bonazza	1.82	not held	
1991	Carla Tuzzi	8.33	Antonella Bevilacqua	1.89	not held	
1992	Daniela Morandini	8.40	Maria Costanza Moroni	1.86	not held	
1993	Carla Tuzzi	8.26	Antonella Bevilacqua	1.95	not held	
1994	Carla Tuzzi	8.10	Antonella Bevilacqua	1.97	not held	
1995	Carla Tuzzi	8.12	Roberta Bugarini	1.86	Maria Carla Bresciani	3.40
1996	Carla Tuzzi	8.19	Antonella Bevilacqua	1.88	Maria Carla Bresciani	3.50
1997	Carla Tuzzi	8.36	Antonella Bevilacqua	1.90	Maria Carla Bresciani	3.70
1998	Erica Barani	8.36	Stefania Cadamuro	1.86	Francesca Dolcini	4.10
1999	Angela Atede (NGR)	8.36	Daniela Galeotti	1.90	Francesca Dolcini	3.90
2000	Margaret Macchiut	8.26	Antonella Bevilacqua	1.90	Francesca Dolcini	4.15
2001	Margaret Macchiut (2)	8.34	Daniela Galeotti	1.84	Francesca Dolcini	4.25
2002	Margaret Macchiut (3)	8.34	Anna Visigalli	1.84	Francesca Dolcini	4.10
2003	Margherita Nicolussi	8.35	Antonietta Di Martino	1.93	Maria Carla Bresciani	3.95
2004	Micol Cattaneo	8.36	Antonella Bevilacqua	1.93	Sarah Semeraro	3.90
2005	Margaret Macchiut (4)	8.14	Anna Visigalli (2)	1.88	Sara Bruzzese	3.95
2006	Margaret Macchiut (5)	8.20	Antonietta Di Martino (2)	1.91	Anna Giordano Bruno	4.20
2007	Micol Cattaneo (2)	8.27	Antonietta Di Martino (3)	1.93	Elena Scarpellini	4.15
2008	Micol Cattaneo (3)	8.14	Raffaella Lamera	1.83	Elena Scarpellini (2)	4.25
2009	Micol Cattaneo (4)	8.28	Antonietta Di Martino (4)	1.96	Anna Giordano Bruno (2)	4.20
2010	Marzia Caravelli	8.26	Raffaella Lamera (2)	1.90	Elena Scarpellini (3)	4.30
2011	Giulia Pennella	8.17	Raffaella Lamera (3)	1.90	Anna Giordano Bruno (3)	4.30
2012	Veronica Borsi	8.18	Raffaella Lamera (4)	1.89	Anna Giordano Bruno (4)	4.30
2013	Veronica Borsi (2)	8.00	Alessia Trost	1.95	Roberta Bruni	4.60
2014	Giulia Pennella (2)	8.04	Elena Brambilla	1.84	Giorgia Benecchi	4.30
2015	Giulia Pennella (3)	8.08	Alessia Trost (2)	1.92	Roberta Bruni (2)	4.30
2016	Giulia Pennella (4)	8.12	Alessia Trost (3)	1.94	Sonia Malavisi	4.35
2017	Elisa Di Lazzaro	8.25	Elena Vallortigara	1.87	Maria Roberta Gherca	4.15
2018	Veronica Borsi (3)	8.19	Alessia Trost (4)	1.90	Roberta Bruni (3)	4.35
2019	Luminosa Bogliolo	8.10	Elena Vallortigara (2)	1.92	Sonia Malavisi (2)	4.50
2020	Linda Guizzetti	8.26	Elena Vallortigara (3)	1.96	Elisa Molinarolo	4.30
2021	Elisa Di Lazzaro (2)	8.16	Alessia Trost (5)	1.92	Roberta Bruni (4)	4.41
2022	Elisa Di Lazzaro (3)	8.18	Elena Vallortigara (3)	1.92	Elisa Molinarolo (2)	4.46

=== Long jump, triple jump, shot put ===
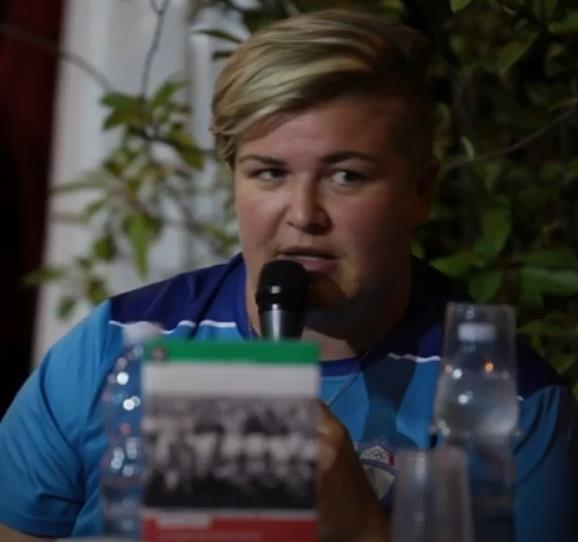
Chiara Rosa, with 12 titles in the shot put at 2021 is the recordwoman. She won also 16 outdoor titles from 2005 to 2020.

Year	Long jump		Triple jump		Shot put	
1970	Anna Maria Lugoboni	5.70	not held		Silvana Forcellini	13.79
1971	Laura De Blasis	5.68	not held		Silvana Forcellini (2)	13.94
1972	Manuela Martinelli	5.68	not held		Maria Stella Masocco	14.98
1973	Silvia Chersoni	5.94	not held		Cinzia Petrucci	15.56
1974	Loredana Fiori	5.74	not held		Cinzia Petrucci (2)	15.31
1975	Maddalena Bruni	5.75	not held		Cinzia Petrucci (3)	16.50
1976	Isabella Lusti (SUI)	6.07	not held		Elena Stoyanova (BUL)	19.41
1977	Barbara Bachlechner	5.73	not held		Ilona Slupianek (GDR)	20.14
1978	Emanuela Nini	6.06	not held		Cinzia Petrucci (4)	16.63
1979	Emanuela Nini	5.99	not held		Angela Anzelotti	15.31
1980	Alba Da Pozzo	5.97	not held		Cinzia Petrucci (5)	17.30
1981	Edine van Heezik (NED)	6.18	not held		Cinzia Petrucci (6)	16.82
1982	Gabriella Pizzolato	6.16	not held		Cinzia Petrucci (7)	16.36
1983	Cristina Bobbi	5.97	not held		Concetta Milanese	15.46
1984	Stefania Lazzaroni	6.27	not held		Concetta Milanese	15.82
1985	Gabriella Pizzolato	6.34	not held		Concetta Milanese (2)	15.78
1986	Alessandra Becatti	6.32	not held		Agnese Maffeis	15.56
1987	Antonella Capriotti	6.44	not held		Agnese Maffeis (2)	15.95
1988	Antonella Capriotti	6.72	not held		Agnese Maffeis (3)	16.00
1989	Elena Ferraris	6.25	not held		Agnese Maffeis (4)	17.19
1990	Antonella Avigni	6.20	not held		Agnese Maffeis (5)	16.26
1991	Valentina Uccheddu	6.61	Luisa Celesia	12.77	Agnese Maffeis (6)	16.86
1992	Antonella Capriotti	6.46	Loredana Rossi	13.18	Agnese Maffeis (7)	17.34
1993	Antonella Capriotti	6.60	Loredana Rossi (2)	13.21	Agnese Maffeis (8)	17.60
1994	Fiona May (GBR)	6.68	Barbara Lah	13.32	Agnese Maffeis (9)	17.23
1995	Elisa Andretti	6.27	Barbara Lah	13.57	Mara Rosolen	16.98
1996	Antonella Capriotti	6.36	Barbara Lah	13.42	Mara Rosolen (2)	17.28
1997	Fiona May	6.84	Maria Costanza Moroni	13.58	Mara Rosolen (3)	18.12
1998	Fiona May	6.83	Barbara Lah	13.79	Mara Rosolen (4)	18.24
1999	Valentina Uccheddu	6.30	Barbara Lah	13.91	Mara Rosolen (5)	17.71
2000	Laura Gatto	6.22	Barbara Lah	13.50	Mara Rosolen (6)	17.90
2001	Maria Chiara Baccini	6.41	Silvia Biondini	13.72	Cristiana Checchi	16.03
2002	Silvia Favre	6.09	Silvia Biondini	13.66	Assunta Legnante	19.20
2003	Thaimi O'Reilly	6.09	Magdelín Martínez	14.46	Assunta Legnante (2)	17.86
2004	Thaimi O'Reilly	6.12	Simona La Mantia	14.25	Assunta Legnante (3)	17.85
2005	Laura Gatto	6.33	Magdelín Martínez (2)	14.52	Assunta Legnante (4)	17.96
2006	Valeria Canella	6.48	Simona La Mantia (2)	14.24	Chiara Rosa	18.41
2007	Valeria Canella (2)	6.48	Francesca Carlotto	13.40	Assunta Legnante (5)	18.65
2008	Valeria Canella (3)	6.44	Magdelín Martínez (3)	14.03	Chiara Rosa (2)	18.63
2009	Tania Vicenzino	6.53	Magdelín Martínez (4)	14.28	Assunta Legnante (6)	18.85
2010	Serena Amato	6.03	Magdelín Martínez (5)	13.94	Julaika Nicoletti	16.35
2011	Laura Strati	6.29	Simona La Mantia (3)	14.33	Chiara Rosa (3)	18.34
2012	Teresa Di Loreto	6.17	Simona La Mantia (4)	14.05	Julaika Nicoletti (2)	17.04
2013	Giulia Liboà	6.00	Simona La Mantia (5)	14.06	Chiara Rosa (4)	18.11
2014	Dariya Derkach	6.28	Simona La Mantia (6)	13.73	Chiara Rosa (5)	18.23
2015	Laura Strati (2)	6.53	Dariya Derkach	13.84	Chiara Rosa (6)	17.51
2016	Martina Lorenzetto	6.33	Simona La Mantia (7)	13.57	Chiara Rosa (7)	17.55
2017	Laura Strati (3)	6.59	Dariya Derkach (2)	14.05	Chiara Rosa (8)	16.17
2018	Tania Vicenzino (2)	6.52	Ottavia Cestonaro	13.47	Chiara Rosa (9)	16.71
2019	Tania Vicenzino (3)	6.60	Francesca Lanciano	13.57	Chiara Rosa (10)	15.72
2020	Laura Strati (4)	6.40	Dariya Derkach (3)	13.40	Chiara Rosa (11)	16.56
2021	Larissa Iapichino	6.91	Dariya Derkach (4)	13.82	Chiara Rosa (12)	17.40
2022	Marta Amouhin Amani	6.32	Dariya Derkach (5)	14.26	Martina Carnevale	16.12
2023	Larissa Iapichino (2)	6.53	Dariya Derkach (6)	14.12	Monia Cantarella	15.96

=== Pentathlon, 3000 m walk ===
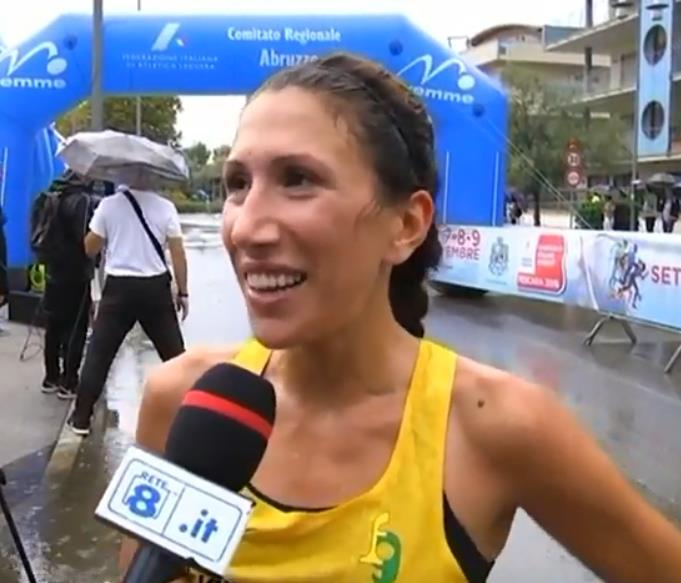
Antonella Palmisano, four victories in the race walk from 2013 to 2019.

Year	Pentathlon		3000 metres walk	
1973	Tosca Degl'Innocenti	3724	not held	
1974	Rita Bottiglieri	4214	not held	
1975	Anna Aldrighetti	3802	not held	
1976	Anna Aldrighetti (2)	3964	not held	
1977	Antonella Ferrario	3547	not held	
1978	not held		not held	
1979	Anna Aldrighetti (3)	3959	not held	
1980	Barbara Bachlechner	3874	not held	
1981	Rosanna Rosati	3655	Giuliana Salce	14:55.36
1982	Rosanna Rosati (2)	3837	Giuliana Salce (2)	14:02.14
1983	Esmeralda Pecchio	3791	Giuliana Salce (3)	13:54.82
1984	Cristina Scatto	3916	Giuliana Salce (4)	12:56.70
1985	Claudia Del Fabbro (2)	3716	Giuliana Salce (5)	13:01.70
1986	Claudia Del Fabbro (3)	4016	Giuliana Salce (6)	12:48.96
1987	Claudia Del Fabbro (4)	4245	Giuliana Salce (7)	13:01.48
1988	Maria Costanza Moroni	4012	Antonella Marangoni	13:36.85
1989	Ifeoma Ozoeze	4020	Ileana Salvador	12:50.63
1990	Ifeoma Ozoeze (2)	4241	Ileana Salvador (2)	12:33.50
1991	Ifeoma Ozoeze (3)	4054	Annarita Sidoti	12:25.54
1992	Ifeoma Ozoeze (4)	4222	Ileana Salvador (3)	12:06.54
1993	Claudia Del Fabbro (5)	3970	Ileana Salvador (4)	11:58.36
1994	Karin Periginelli	4246	Annarita Sidoti (2)	12:01.41
1995	Gertrud Bacher	4013	not held	
1996	Karin Periginelli (2)	4202	Erica Alfridi	12:18.74
1997	Karin Periginelli (3)	4385	Erica Alfridi (2)	12:00.13
1998	Karin Periginelli (4)	4163	Elisabetta Perrone	12:16.31
1999	Gertrud Bacher	4165	Erica Alfridi (3)	12:39.03
2000	Karin Periginelli (5)	4188	Erica Alfridi (4)	12:10.18
2001	Silvia Dalla Piana	4241	Annarita Sidoti	12:25.97
2002	Gertrud Bacher (2)	4106	Annarita Sidoti (3)	12:28.13
2003	Gertrud Bacher (3)	4221	Elisabetta Perrone (2)	12:13.00
2004	Gertrud Bacher (4)	4260	Elisa Rigaudo	11:57.00
2005	Silvia Dalla Piana	4009	Elisa Rigaudo (2)	12:09.57
2006	Cecilia Ricali	4080	Elisa Rigaudo (3)	12:10.61
2007	Cecilia Ricali (2)	4194	Elisa Rigaudo (4)	12:14.72
2008	Francesca Doveri	4236	Elisa Rigaudo (5)	12:10.23
2009	Francesca Doveri (2)	4423	Elisa Rigaudo (6)	12:40.75
2010	Cecilia Ricali (3)	4205	Sibilla Di Vincenzo	12:42.15
2011	Francesca Doveri (3)	4224	Sibilla Di Vincenzo (2)	12:42.61
2012	Cecilia Ricali (4)	4146	Eleonora Giorgi	12:53.14
2013	Laura Rendina	4121	Antonella Palmisano	12:53.63
2014	Enrica Cipolloni	4036	Eleonora Giorgi (2)	11:50.08
2015	Laura Oberto	4176	Antonella Palmisano (2)	12:05.68
2016	Ottavia Cestonaro	3792	Sibilla Di Vincenzo (3)	13:10.99
2017	Ottavia Cestonaro (2)	4060	Sibilla Di Vincenzo (4)	12:55.77
2018	Enrica Cipolloni (2)	3860	Antonella Palmisano (3)	11:55.30
2019	Sveva Gerevini	3904	Antonella Palmisano (4)	12:23.15
2020	Sveva Gerevini (2)	4031	Valentina Trapletti	12:53.61
2021	Marta Giovannini	3991	Valentina Trapletti (2)	12:43.04
2022	Sveva Gerevini (3)	4451	Simona Bertini	12:55.13

== See also ==
- Italian Athletics Indoor Championships
- List of Italian Athletics Championships winners
