= 2012 Italian Athletics Indoor Championships =

- Dates: 25-26 February
- Host city: Ancona
- Venue: Palaindoor di Ancona
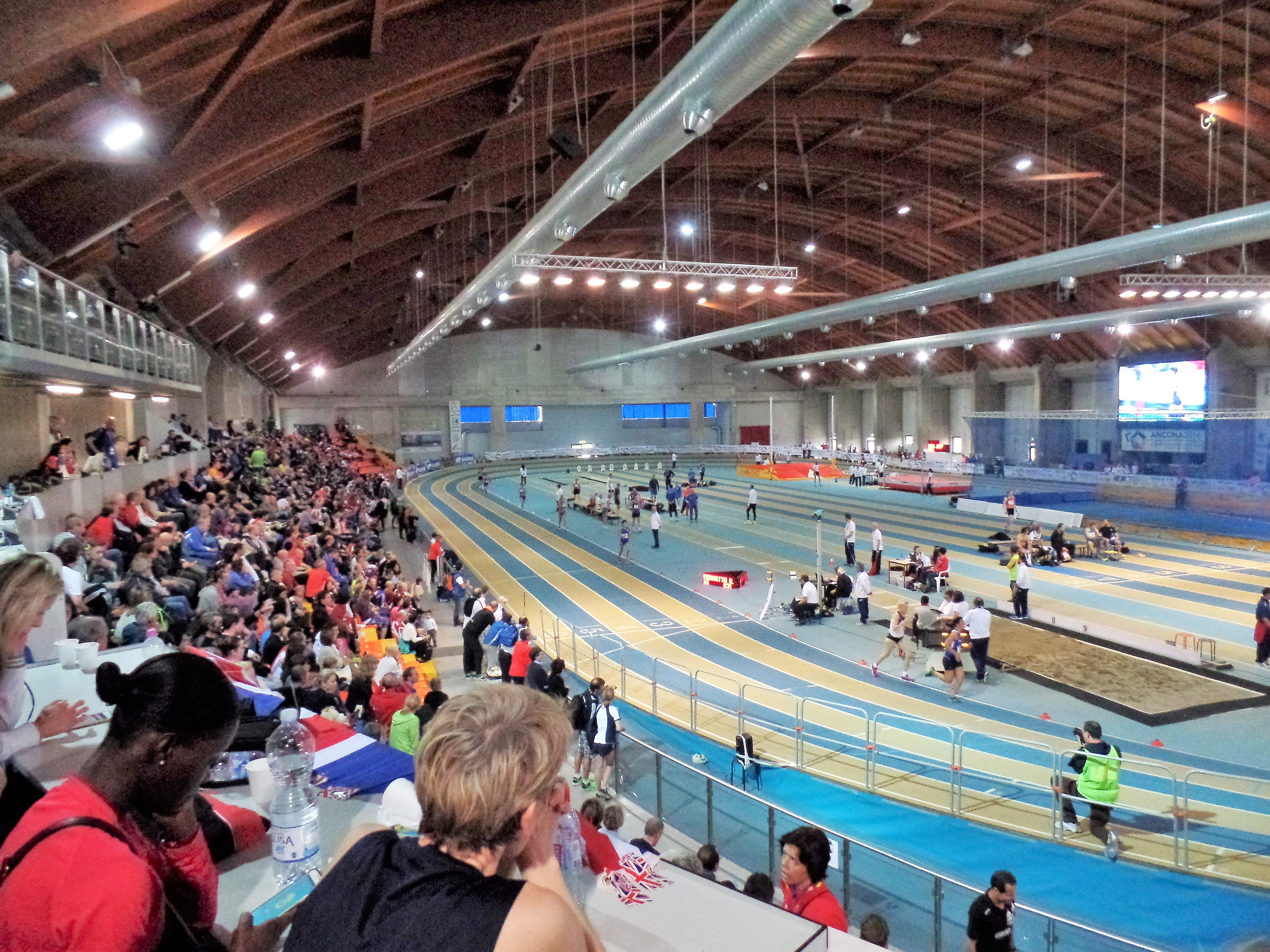
- Level: Senior
- Events: 24

2012 Italian Athletics Indoor Championships was the 43rd edition of the Italian Athletics Indoor Championships and were held in Ancona.

== Results ==
=== Men ===
Event	1st place	Performance	2nd place	Performance	3rd place	Performance
60 m	Michael Tumi	6.64 PB	Simone Collio	6.69	Francesco Basciani	6.73 PB
400 m	Lorenzo Valentini	46.88 PB	Isalbet Juarez	47.17 PB	Marco Moraglio	48.34
800 m	Giordano Benedetti	1:50.82	Michele Oberti	1:51.49 SB	Emiliano Ballati	1:51.56
1500 m	Merihun Crespi	3:44.79	Abdellah Haidane	3:44.79 PB	Marco Salami Najib	3:45.51 SB
3000 m	Abdellah Haidane	8:11.71 SB	Merihun Crespi	8:12.00 PB	Marco Salami Najib	8:12.11 SB
60 m hurdles	Paolo Dal Molin	7.75	Stefano Tedesco	7.95	Carlo Redaelli	8.01
5000 m race walk	Giorgio Rubino	19:22.80 SB	Diego Cafagna	20:12.19 SB	Riccardo Macchia	20:30.61 SB
High jump	Silvano Chesani	2.31 PB	Marco Fassinotti	2.26 SB	Filippo Campioli	2.26
Pole vault	Claudio Michel Stecchi	5.60 PB	Matteo Rubbiani	5.50 PB	Marco Boni	5.50 PB
Long jump	Fabrizio Donato	7.95 SB	Emanuele Catania	7.84 PB	Emanuele Formichetti	7.78
Triple jump	Andrea Chiari	16.85 PB	Fabrizio Schembri	16.71 SB	Stefano Magnini	16.08 PB
Shot put	Paolo Dal Soglio	18.78	Daniele Secci	18.48	Marco Di Maggio	18.24

=== Women ===
Event	1st place	Performance	2nd place	Performance	3rd place	Performance
60 m	Audrey Alloh	7.39	Jessica Paoletta	7.40	Ilenia Draisci	7.49
400 m	Maria Enrica Spacca	53.00 PB	Marta Milani	53.83 SB	Elena Bonfanti	54.24 PB
800 m	Elisa Cusma	2:04.97	Serena Monachino	2:08.03 PB	Elisabetta Artuso	2:08.21 SB
1500 m	Elisa Cusma	4:17.79 SB	Valentina Costanza	4:20.07	Viola Giulia	4:20.75 PB
3000 m	Silvia Weissteiner	9:01.35 SB	Giulia Martinelli	9:18.91 PB	Angela Rinicella	9:23.23 SB
60 m hurdles	Veronica Borsi	8.18 PB	Giulia Pennella	8.26 SB	Alessandra Feudatari	8.49 SB
3000 m race walk	Eleonora Giorgi	12:53.14 SB	Federica Ferraro	13:23.27 PB	Serena Pruner	13:29.23 SB
High jump	Raffaella Lamera	1.89 SB	Chiara Vitobello	1.85 SB	Enrica Cipolloni	1.85 PB
Pole vault	Anna Giordano Bruno	4.30	Giorgia Benecchi	4.20	Roberta Bruni	4.10
Long jump	Teresa Di Loreto	6.17 SB	Francesca Paiero	6.12 PB	Ottavia Cestonaro	6.08
Triple jump	Simona La Mantia	14.05 SB	Eleonora D'Elicio	13.35 SB	Cecilia Pacchetti	13.02 SB
Shot put	Julaika Nicoletti	17.04 PB	Elena Carini	15.33 SB	Serena Capponcelli	15.10 PB
