= 2016 Italian Athletics Indoor Championships =

- Dates: 5–6 March
- Host city: Ancona
- Venue: Palaindoor di Ancona
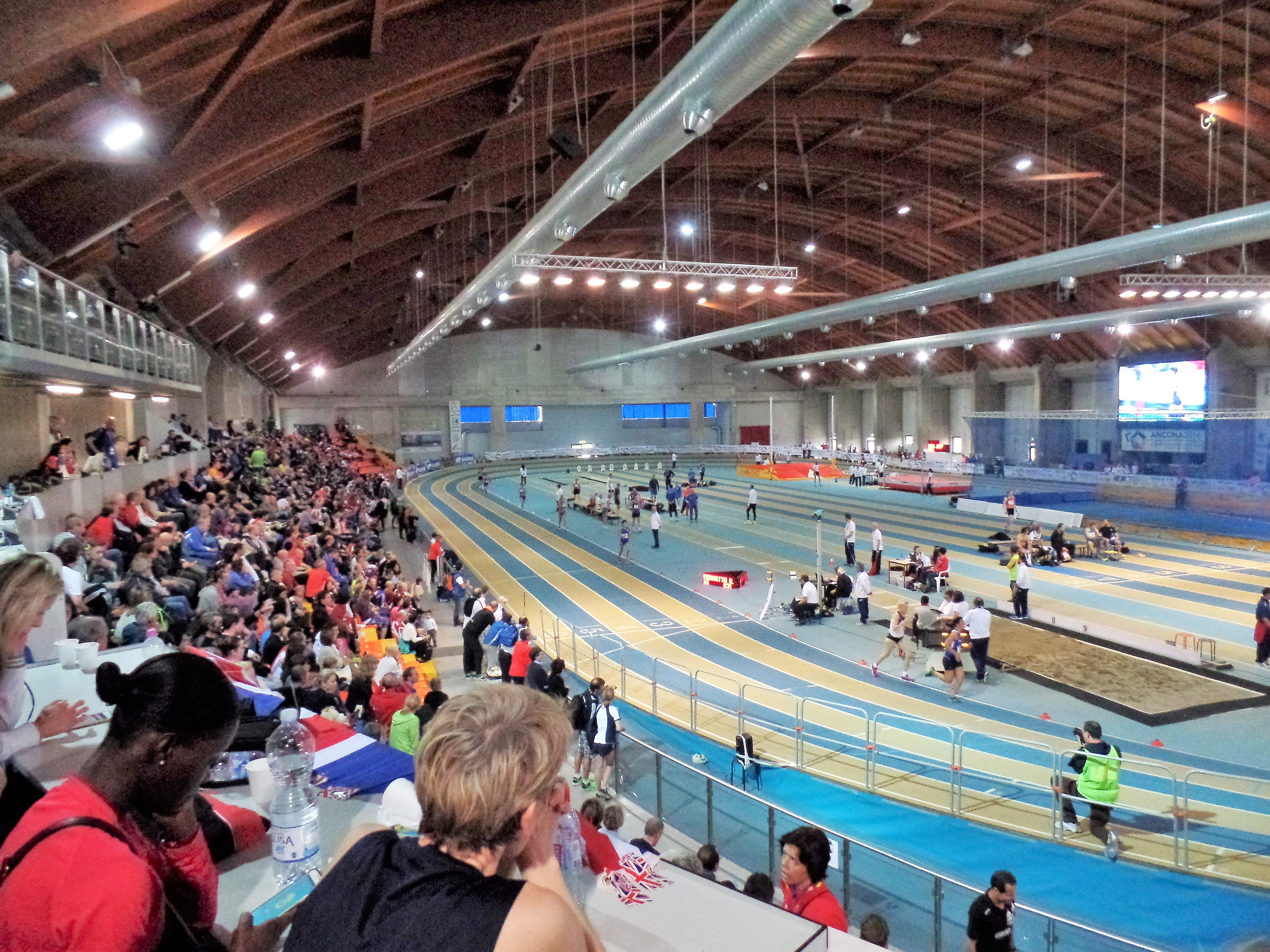
- Level: Senior
- Events: 24 + relays

2016 Italian Athletics Indoor Championships was the 47th edition of the Italian Athletics Indoor Championships and were held in Ancona.

== Champions ==
=== Women ===
Event	National record	Champion	Team	Performance
60m	7.19	Ilenia Draisci	C.S. Esercito	7.40
400m	52.17	Ayomide Folorunso	G.S. Fiamme Oro Padova	53.16
800m	1:59.25	Marta Zenoni	Atl. Bergamo 1959 Creberg	2:03.88
1500m	4:04.01	Marta Zenoni	Atl. Bergamo 1959 Creberg	4:24.59
3000m	8:44.81	Valentina Costanza	C.S. Esercito	9:24.12
60 Hs	7.94	Giulia Pennella	C.S. Esercito	8.12
High jump	2.04	Alessia Trost	G.A. Fiamme Gialle	1.94
Pole vault	4.60	Sonia Malavisi	G.A. Fiamme Gialle	4.35
Long jump	6.91	Martina Lorenzetto	Bracco Atletica	6.33
Triple jump	14.81	Simona La Mantia	G.A. Fiamme Gialle	13.57
Shot put	19.20	Chiara Rosa	G.S. Fiamme Azzurre	17.55
Race walk 3000m	11:50.08	Sibilla Di Vincenzo	Bracco Atletica	13:10.99
Relay 4x1 Lap	1:36.40	C.S. Esercito (Draisci I. - Bazzoni C. - Lukudo R. - Siragusa I.)		1:38.01

=== Men ===
Event	National record	Champion	Team	Performance
60m	6.51	Michael Tumi	G.S. Fiamme Oro Padova	6.68
400m	45.99	Matteo Galvan	G.A. Fiamme Gialle	47.29
800m	1:45.44	Gabriele Bizzotto	C.U.S. Parma	1:51.14
1500m	3:37.50	Mohad Abdikadar Sheik Ali	C.S. Aeronautica Militare	3:44.68
3000m	7:41.05	Yemaneberhan Crippa	G.S. Fiamme Oro Padova	7:57.25
60 Hs	7.51	Lorenzo Perini	C.S. Aeronautica Militare	7.76
High jump	2.38	Gianmarco Tamberi	G.A. Fiamme Gialle	2.36
Pole vault	5.82	Alessandro Sinno	C.S. Aeronautica Militare	5.35
Long jump	8.30	Stefano Tremigliozzi	C.S. Aeronautica Militare	7.84
Triple jump	17.73	Fabrizio Schembri	C.S. Carabinieri Sez. Atletica	16.82
Shot put	21.54	Daniele Secci	G.A. Fiamme Gialle	19.35
Race walk 5000m	18:08.86	Francesco Fortunato	G.A. Fiamme Gialle	19:12.00
Relay 4x1 Lap	1:24.72	Atl. Riccardi Milano 1946 (Tortu G. - Galbieri G. - Tanzilli S. - Cattaneo F.)		1:26.39

== See also ==
- 2013 Italian Athletics Championships
