= 2011 Italian Athletics Championships =

101st edition of the Italian Athletics Championships

- Dates: 25–26 June
- Host city: Turin
- Level: Senior
- Events: 42

The 2011 Italian Athletics Championships was the 101st edition of the Italian Athletics Championships and were held in Turin on 25–26 June 2011.

== Men ==
Event	Gold		Silver		Bronze	
100 m (- 0,7 m/s)	Matteo Galvan	10.38 (PB)	Emanuele Di Gregorio	10.41	Michael Tumi	10.44
200 m (+0,1 m/s)	Andrew Howe	20.52	Emanuele Di Gregorio	20.96	Davide Manenti	21.11
400 m	Marco Vistalli	45.88 (SB)	Isalbet Juarez	46.51 (PB)	Michele Tricca	46.69
800 m	Giordano Benedetti	1:49.26	Mario Scapini	1:49.51	Livio Sciandra	1:50.00 (SB)
1 500 m	Merihun Crespi	3:47.53	Lukas Rifesser	3:48.05	Giovanni Bellino	3:48.49
5 000 m	Stefano La Rosa	14:02.29	Daniele Meucci	14:03.19 (SB)	Kaddour Slimani	14:03.60
10 000 m	Domenico Ricatti	29:51.84	Francesco Bona	29:57.21	Riccardo Sterni	29:57.82
4 x 100 m	Massimiliano Dentali; Giovanni Tomasicchio; Giacomo Tortu; Paolo Pistono	40.65	Carlo Nardi; Marco Vescovi; Filippo Michele Reina; Lorenzo Angelini	41.15	Paolo Castellini; Luca Berti Rigo; Andrea Luciani; Enrico Pra'floriani	41.40
4 x 400 m	Enrico Demonte; Isalbet Juarez; Marco Vistalli; Domenico Fontana	3:11.99	Marco Valentini; Andrea Bufalino; Giovanni Albano; Lorenzo Valentini	3:12.17	Samuele Mattei; Fabio Fedele; Fabio Crispino; Arcangelo Morizio	3:15.78
110 m hurdles (-0,1 m/s)	Emanuele Abate	13.71	Michele Calvi	13.81 (PB)	John Mark Nalocca	14.03 (SB)
400 m hurdles	José de Leon	50.55	Giacomo Panizza	50.85	Leonardo Capotosti	51.22
3000 m steeple	Yuri Floriani	8:37.66 (SB)	Matteo Villani	8:47.46 (SB)	Antonio Garavello	8:49.97 (PB)
High jump	Silvano Chesani	2.28	Marco Fassinotti	2.25 (SB)	Andrea Bettinelli	2.25 (SB)
Pole vault	Sergio D'Orio	5.30 (SB)	Claudio Michel Stecchi	5.20 (SB)	Marco Boni	5.20 (SB)
Long jump	Stefano Dacastello	7.82 (SB)	Andrew Howe	7.68 (SB)	Stefano Tremigliozzi	7.66 (SB)
Triple jump	Fabrizio Donato	17.17 (SB)	Fabrizio Schembri	16.94	Michele Boni	16.37 (SB)
Shot Put	Paolo Dal Soglio	18.58 (SB)	Marco Di Maggio	18.33 (SB)	Marco Dodoni	17.41
Discus Throw	Giovanni Faloci	59.05	Hannes Kirchler	58.99	Eduardo Albertazzi	57.42 (PB)
Hammer Throw	Nicola Vizzoni	76.29	Marco Lingua	76.12 (SB)	Lorenzo Povegliano	70.71
Javelin Throw	Leonardo Gottardo	75.15	Norbert Bonvecchio	74.04	Roberto Bertolini	72.06 (SB)
10 000 m walk	Jean-Jacques Nkouloukidi	39:44.70 (PB)	Federico Tontodonati	41:00.03 (PB)	Lorenzo Dessi	43:19.20 (PB)

== Women ==
Event	Gold		Silver		Bronze	
100 m (- 0,2 m/s)	Ilenia Draisci	11.65 (PB)	Audrey Alloh	11.68	Jessica Paoletta	11.74 (SB)
200 m (- 0,1 m/s)	Marzia Caravelli	23.41 (PB)	Giulia Arcioni	23.68 (SB)	Anna Bongiorni	23.97
400 m	Marta Milani	52.29	Libania Grenot	52.32 (SB)	Maria Enrica Spacca	52.62 (PB)
800 m	Elisabetta Artuso	2:07.11	Daniela Reina	2:07.64	Cristina Grange	2:07.69
1 500 m	Elisa Cusma Piccione	4:13.38 (SB)	Giulia Viola	4:17.14 (PB)	Maria Vittoria Fontanesi	4:17.20
5 000 m	Silvia Weissteiner	15:48.94 (SB)	Elena Romagnolo	15:54.73 (SB)	Rosaria Console	16:13.56 (SB)
10 000 m	Nadia Ejjafini	32:28.80	Valeria Straneo	32:35.11 (PB)	Federica Dal Ri	33:40.02
4 x 100 m	Manuela Grillo; Martina Giovanetti; Giulia Arcioni; Maria Enrica Spacca	44.94	Ilenia Draisci; Rita de Cesaris; Jessica Paoletta; Clelia Calcagno	45.34	Elena Sordelli; Laura Gamba; Martina Fugazza; Michela D'angelo	46.24
4 x 400 m	Chiara Bazzoni; Clelia Calcagno; Maria Benedict Chigbolu; Marta Milani	3:38.86	Chiara Gervasi; Cristina Grange; Donata Piangerelli; Flavia Battaglia	3:43.61	Anisia Aceti; Sara Elen Bianchi Bazzi; Marta Cereda; Elena Bonfanti	3:48.62
110 m hurdles (- 0,3 m/s)	Marzia Caravelli	13.05 (PB)	Micol Cattaneo	13.28 (SB)	Giulia Pennella	13.29
400 m hurdles	Manuela Gentili	56.69 (SB)	Aida Valente	58.20 (PB)	Anna Laura Marone	58.55 (SB)
3000 m steeple	Valentina Costanza	10:05.52	Micaela Bonessi	10:24.34 (SB)	Valeria Roffino	10:27.68 (SB)
High jump	Raffaella Lamera	1.88	Giovanna Demo	1.84 (PB)	Elena Meuti	1.80
Pole vault	Anna Giordano Bruno	4.40 (SB)	Elena Scarpellini	4.20	Giulia Cargnelli; Angela Sterpetti	4.10 (PB)
Long jump	Tania Vicenzino	6.26	Anastassia Angioi	6.26	Elisa Zanei	6.21 (SB)
Triple jump	Simona La Mantia	14.40	Silvia Cucchi	13.36 (SB)	Barbara Lah	13.23 (SB)
Shot Put	Chiara Rosa	17.64	Julaika Nicoletti	15.71	Elena Carini	15.34
Discus Throw	Laura Bordignon	55.47	Valentina Aniballi	52.45	Tamara Apostolico	51.94
Hammer Throw	Silvia Salis	69.57	Elisa Palmieri	67.33 (PB)	Micaela Mariani	61.23 (PB)
Javelin Throw	Zahra Bani	59.92 (SB)	Silvia Carli	53.99 (SB)	Tiziana Rocco	53.13 (SB)
10 000 m walk	Federica Ferraro	46:34.85	Rossella Giordano	47:43.51	Eleonora Giorgi	49:08.15
