= 2015 Italian Athletics Championships =

- Dates: 24–26 July
- Host city: Turin
- Venue: Stadio Primo Nebiolo
- Level: Senior
- Events: 42

The 2015 Italian Athletics Championships (Italian: Campionati italiani assoluti di atletica leggera 2015) was the 105th edition of the Italian Athletics Championships and were held in Turin from 24 to 26 July 2015.

== Champions ==
Event	Men	Performance	Women	Performance
100 m	Fabio Cerutti	10.31 (+1.0)	Gloria Hooper	11.47 (+0.0)
200 m	Davide Manenti	21.00 (-0.2)	Gloria Hooper	23.48 (-1.5)
400 m	Matteo Galvan	46.11	Libania Grenot	51.47
800 m	Giordano Benedetti	1:47.38	Marta Zenoni	2:04.18
1500 m	Mohad Abdikadar Sheik Ali	3:42.79	Margherita Magnani	4:19.29
5000 m	Marouan Razine	13:50.87	Silvia Weissteiner	16:03.55
3000 m steeplechase	Jamel Chatbi	8:30.35	Valeria Roffino	10:07.23
100 m hurdles	Hassane Fofana	13.59 (-1.3)	Giulia Tessaro	13.14 (+0.5)
400 m hurdles	Leonardo Capotosti	49.95	Yadisleidy Pedroso	55.96
High jump	Marco Fassinotti	2.30	Desiree Rossit	1.86
Pole vault	Claudio Stecchi	5.50	Sonia Malavisi	4.30
Long jump	Filippo Randazzo	7.76 (-1.1)	Martina Lorenzetto	6.49 (+0.2)
Triple jump	Fabrizio Donato	16.91 (+0.5)	Ottavia Cestonaro	13.76 (+1.9)
Shot put	Daniele Secci	19.18	Chiara Rosa	17.33
Discus throw	Hannes Kirchler	60.25	Stefania Strumillo	56.37
Hammer throw	Marco Bortolato	70.85	Silvia Salis	67.51
Javelin throw	Roberto Bertolini	79.32	Sara Jemai	56.39
10 km walk road	Federico Tontodonati	40:36:00	Elisa Rigaudo	43:08:00
4X100 relay	G.A. Fiamme Gialle; Fabio Cerutti; Fausto Desalu; Lorenzo Valentini; Delmas Obou	40.41	G.S. Forestale	44.59
4X400 relay	G.A. Fiamme Gialle	3:10.45	C.S. Esercito	3:35.40
Decatthlon/Heptathlon	Simone Cairoli	7482	Federica Palumbo	5385
