= 2014 Italian Athletics Indoor Championships =

- Dates: 22–23 February
- Host city: Ancona
- Venue: Palaindoor di Ancona
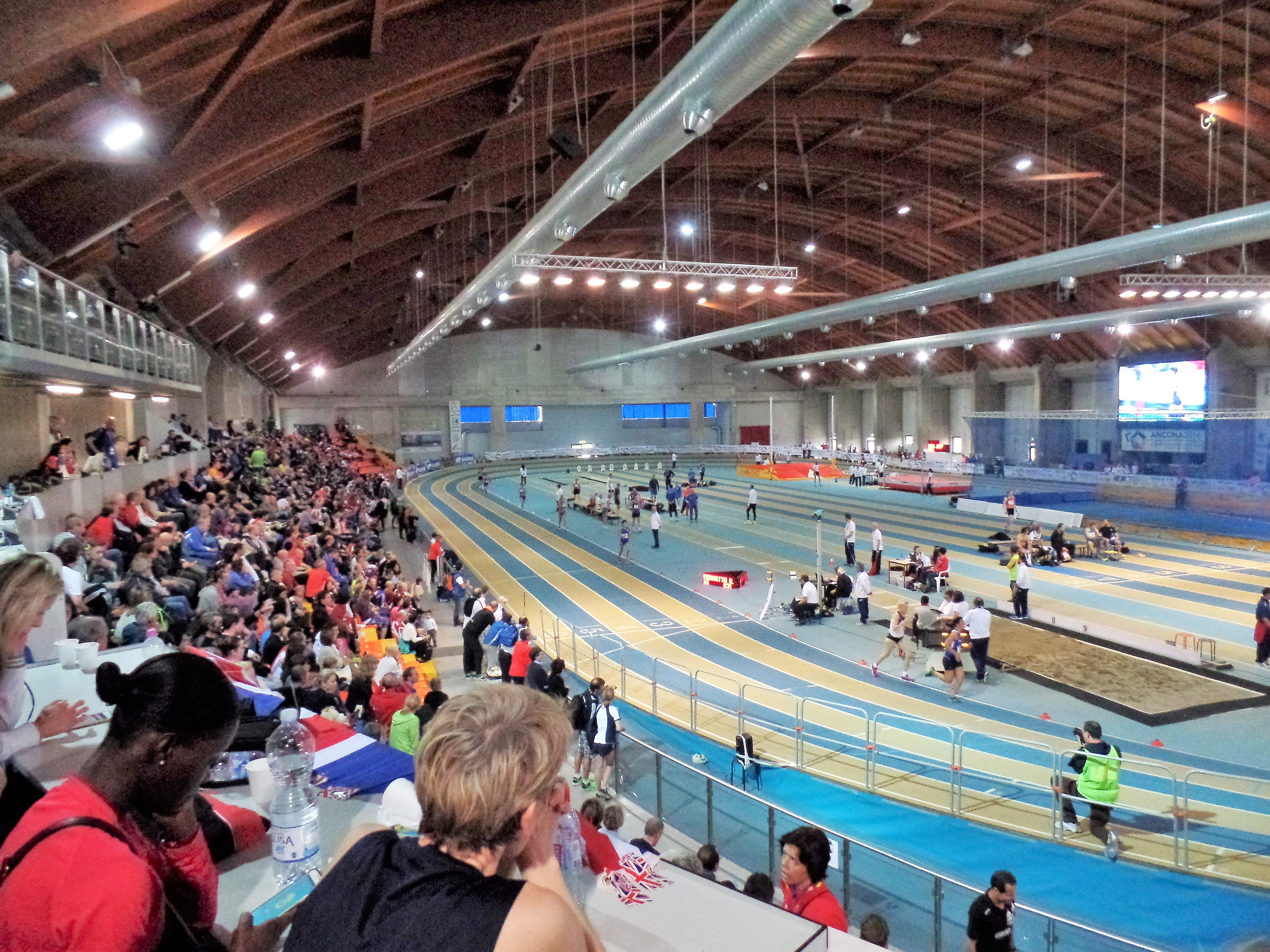
- Level: Senior
- Events: 24 + relays

2014 Italian Athletics Indoor Championships was the 45th edition of the Italian Athletics Indoor Championships and were held in Ancona.

== Champions ==
=== Women ===
Event	Champion	Team	Performance
60m	Audrey Alloh	G.S. Fiamme Azzurre	7.34
400m	Chiara Bazzoni	C.S. Esercito	53.44
800m	Marta Milani	C.S. Esercito	2:05.39
1500m	Margherita Magnani	G.A. Fiamme Gialle	4:11.98
3000m	Giulia A. Viola	G.A. Fiamme Gialle	9:12.70
60 Hs	Giulia Pennella	C.S. Esercito	8.04
High jump	Elena Brambilla	G.S. Fiamme Azzurre	1.84
Pole vault	Giorgia Benecchi	C.S. Esercito	4.30
Long jump	Dariya Derkach	C.S. Aeronautica Militare	6.28
Triple jump	Simona La Mantia	G.A. Fiamme Gialle	13.73
Shot put	Chiara Rosa	G.S. Fiamme Azzurre	18.23
Race walk 3000m	Eleonora A. Giorgi	G.S. Fiamme Azzurre	11:50.08 NR
Relay 4x1 Lap	G.S. Forestale (Hooper G. - Arcioni G. - Bongiorni A. - Spacca M.)		1:37.10

=== Men ===
Event	Champion	Team	Performance
60m	Fabio Cerutti	G.A. Fiamme Gialle	6.68
400m	Matteo Galvan	G.A. Fiamme Gialle	46.97
800m	Giordano Benedetti	G.A. Fiamme Gialle	1:50.25
1500m	Abdellah Haidane	Cus Pro Patria Milano	3:44.26
3000m	Jamel Chatbi	Atl. Riccardi Milano	7:58.53
60 Hs	Paolo Dal Molin	G.S. Fiamme Oro Padova	7.60
High jump	Marco Fassinotti	C.S. Aeronautica Militare	2.34 NR
Pole vault	Alessandro Sinno	C.S. Aeronautica Militare	5.35
Long jump	Stefano Tremigliozzi	C.S. Aeronautica Militare	8.06
Triple jump	Fabrizio Schembri	C.S. Carabinieri Sez. Atletica	16.78
Shot put	Daniele Secci	G.A. Fiamme Gialle	18.64
Race walk 5000m	Matteo Giupponi	C.S. Carabinieri Sez. Atletica	19:51.07
Relay 4x1 Lap	G.A. Fiamme Gialle (Desalu E. - Tricca M. - Marani D. - Galvan M.)		1:25.79

== See also ==
- 2013 Italian Athletics Championships
