= Lorenzetto (surname) =

Lorenzetto is a surname. Notable people with that name include;

- Martina Lorenzetto (born 1992), Italian long jumper
- Mirco Lorenzetto (born 1981), Italian cyclist

== See also ==
- Lorenzetto (1490–1541), Italian sculptor and architect
