= 2015 Italian Athletics Indoor Championships =

- Dates: 21–22 February
- Host city: Padua
- Venue: Palaindoor di Padova
- Level: Senior
- Events: 24 + relays

2015 Italian Athletics Indoor Championships was the 46th edition of the Italian Athletics Indoor Championships and were held in Padua for the first time.

== Champions ==
=== Women ===
Event	National record	Champion	Team	Performance
60m	7.19	Audrey Alloh	G.S. Fiamme Azzurre	7.34
400m	52.17	Chiara Bazzoni	C.S. Esercito	53.51
800m	1:59.25	Elisa Cusma Piccione	C.S. Esercito	2:08.43
1500m	4:04.01	Giulia A. Viola	G.A. Fiamme Gialle	4:13.20
3000m	8:44.81	Giulia A. Viola	G.A. Fiamme Gialle	8:56.23
60 Hs	7.94	Giulia Pennella	C.S. Esercito	8.08
High jump	2.04	Alessia Trost	G.A. Fiamme Gialle	1.92
Pole vault	4.60	Roberta Bruni	G.S. Forestale	4.30
Long jump	6.91	Laura Strati	Atl.Vicentina	6.53
Triple jump	14.81	Dariya Derkach	C.S. Aeronautica Militare	13.84
Shot put	19.20	Chiara Rosa	G.S. Fiamme Azzurre	17.51
Race walk 3000m	11:50.08	Antonella Palmisano	G.A. Fiamme Gialle	12:05.68
Relay 4x1 Lap	1:36.40	C.S. Esercito (Draisci I. - Chigbolu M. - Lukudo R. - Bazzoni C.)		1:37.80

=== Men ===
Event	National record	Champion	Team	Performance
60m	6.51	Delmas Obou	G.A. Fiamme Gialle	6.66
400m	45.99	Matteo Galvan	G.A. Fiamme Gialle	46.80
800m	1:45.44	Joao C. Bussotti Neves Junior	Atletica Livorno	1:50.68
1500m	3:37.50	Joao C. Bussotti Neves Junior	Atletica Livorno	3:54.25
3000m	7:41.05	Said El Otmani	Atl. Reggio Asd	8:06.27
60 Hs	7.51	Hassane Fofana	G.S. Fiamme Oro Padova	7.80
High jump	2.34	Silvano Chesani	G.S. Fiamme Oro Padova	2.29
Pole vault	5.82	Marco Boni	C.S. Aeronautica Militare	5.40
Long jump	8.30	Emanuele Catania	G.A. Fiamme Gialle	7.72
Triple jump	17.73	Fabrizio Schembri	C.S. Carabinieri Sez. Atletica	16.58
Shot put	21.54	Daniele Secci	G.A. Fiamme Gialle	19.56
Race walk 5000m	18:08.86	Leonardo Dei Tos	Athletic Club 96 Ae Spa	19:16.34
Relay 4x1 Lap	1:24.72	G.A. Fiamme Gialle (Desalu E. - Tricca M. - Marani D. - Galvan M.)		1:26.40

== See also ==
- 2013 Italian Athletics Championships
