= 2013 Italian Athletics Indoor Championships =

- Dates: 16–17 February
- Host city: Ancona
- Venue: Palaindoor di Ancona
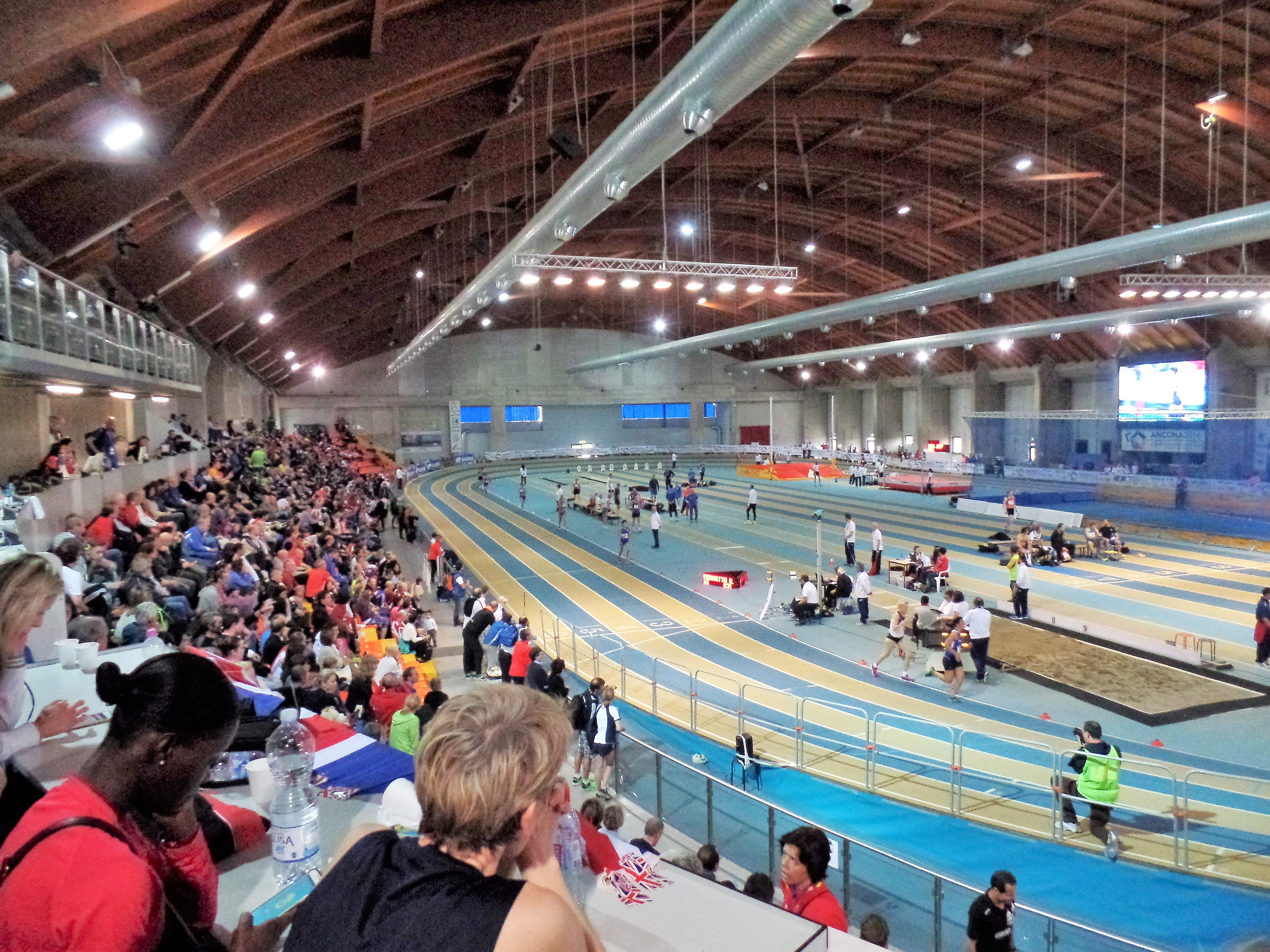
- Level: Senior
- Events: 26
- Records set: 3

2013 Italian Athletics Indoor Championships was the 44th edition of the Italian Athletics Indoor Championships and were held in Ancona.

== Records ==
In this edition of the championships have fallen three national records: Michael Tumi (6.51 in male 60 metres), Silvano Chesani (2.33 m in male high jump) and the junior Roberta Bruni (4.60 m in female pole vault).

== Champions ==
Event	Men	Performance	Women	Performance
60 m	Michael Tumi	6.51	Audrey Alloh	7.37
400 m	Isalbet Juarez	47.11	Chiara Bazzoni	53.78
800 m	Giordano Benedetti	1:48.11	Elisa Cusma	2:04.01
1500 m	Najibe Salami	3:49.96	Margherita Magnani	4:14.5
3000 m	Abdellah Haidane	8:00.97	Silvia Weissteiner	9:03.29
60 m hs	Stefano Tedesco	7.87	Veronica Borsi	8.00
5000/3000 m race walk	Giorgio Rubino	19:32.51	Antonella Palmisano	12:53.63
Long jump	Stefano Tremigliozzi	7.95 m	Giulia Liboà	6.00 m
Triple jump	Michele Boni	16.55 m	Simona La Mantia	14.06 m
High jump	Silvano Chesani	2.33 m	Alessia Trost	1.95 m
Pole vault	Giorgio Piantella	5.50 m	Roberta Bruni	4.60 m
Shot put	Marco Dodoni	18.31 m	Chiara Rosa	18.11 m
4×200 m relay	Fiamme Gialle; Lorenzo Valentini; Michele Tricca; Francesco Patano; Marco Lorenzi	1:27.13	Esercito; Ilenia Draisci; Anna Laura Marone; Francesca Doveri; Chiara Bazzoni	1:37.72

== See also ==
- 2013 Italian Athletics Championships
