= 2020 Italian Athletics Indoor Championships =

- Dates: 22–23 February
- Host city: Ancona
- Venue: Palaindoor di Ancona
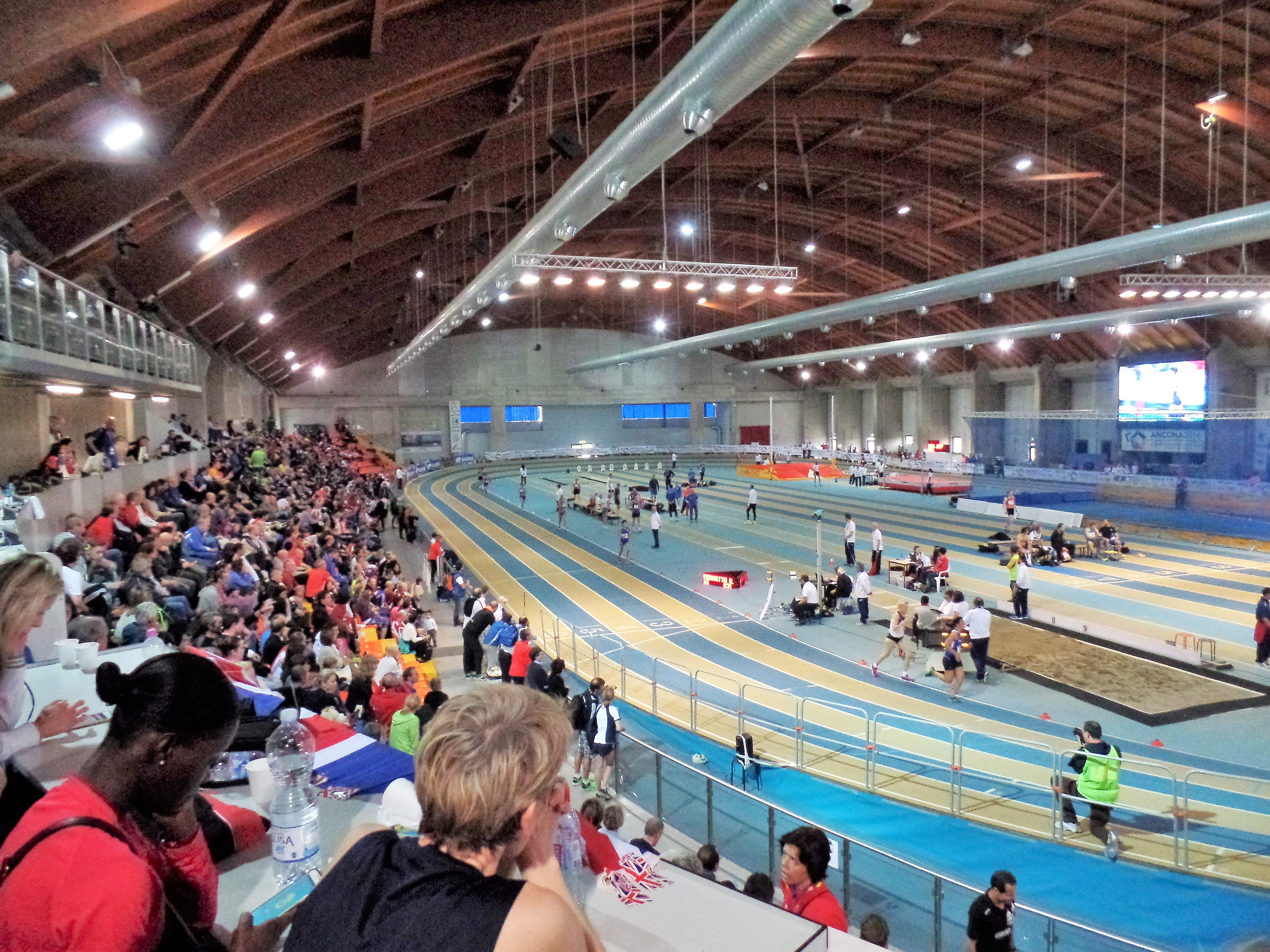
- Level: Senior
- Events: 26

2020 Italian Athletics Indoor Championships was the 51st edition of the Italian Athletics Indoor Championships and were held in Ancona.

== Champions ==
Event	Men	Performance	Women	Performance
60 m	Filippo Tortu	6.60	Irene Siragusa	7.34
400 m	Michele Tricca	48.03	Ayomide Folorunso	52.82
800 m	Simone Barontini	1:48.41	Elena Bellò	2:06.46
1500 m	Yassin Bouih	3:40.73	Gaia Sabbatini	4:13.62 PB
3000 m	Yassin Bouih	8:24.75	Elisa Bortoli	9:16.50
60 m hs	Lorenzo Perini	7.72	Linda Guizzetti	8.26
5000/3000 m race walk	Francesco Fortunato	18:50.22	Valentina Trapletti	12:53.61
Long jump	Gabriele Chilà	8.00 m	Laura Strati	6.40 m
Triple jump	Edoardo Accetta	16.62 m	Dariya Derkach	13.40 m
High jump	Marco Fassinotti	2.20 m	Elena Vallortigara	1.96 m PB (indoor)
Pole vault	Max Mandusic	5.45	Elisa Molinarolo	5.30 m
Shot put	Leonardo Fabbri	21.45 m	Chiara Rosa	16.56 m
Combined events (heptahlon/pentathlon)	Simone Cairoli	5939 pts	Sveva Gerevini	4031 pts

== See also ==
- 2020 Italian Athletics Championships
