= Sibilla Di Vincenzo =

Italian racewalker (born 1983)

Personal information
- Nationality: Italian
- Born: 22 January 1983 (age 43) Lanciano, Italy
- Height: 1.74 m (5 ft 9 in)
- Weight: 52 kg (115 lb)

Sport
- Country: Italy
- Sport: Athletics
- Event: Racewalking
- Club: Bracco Atletica Milano
- Coached by: Enzo Fiorillo
- Retired: 2017

Achievements and titles
- Personal best: 20 km walk: 1:38:32 (2016)
Medal record
| Event | 1st | 2nd | 3rd |
|---|---|---|---|
| European Race Walking Cup | 0 | 1 | 0 |
| Total | 0 | 1 | 0 |

Sibilla Di Vincenzo (born 22 January 1983) is a racewalker who won a silver medal with the Italian team at the European Race Walking Cup.

== Achievements ==
| Year | Competition | Venue | Position | Event | Performance | Notes |
|---|---|---|---|---|---|---|
| 2010 | European Championships | (Spain) Barcelona | DSQ | 20 km | no time | |
| 2017 | European Race Walking Cup | (Czech Republic) Poděbrady | DSQ | 20 km | no time | |
| 2017 | European Race Walking Cup | (Czech Republic) Poděbrady | 2nd | Team | 34 pts | |

== National titles ==
She won 10 time the national championships.

- Italian Athletics Championships
  - 5 km walk: 2005, 2008, 2009, 2010 (4)
  - 20 km walk: 2010, 2016 (2)
- Italian Athletics Indoor Championships
  - 3000 m walk: 2010, 2011, 2016, 2017 (4)

== See also ==
- Italian team at the running events
- Italy at the European Race Walking Cup
