= Concetta Milanese =

Italian shot putter (born 1962)

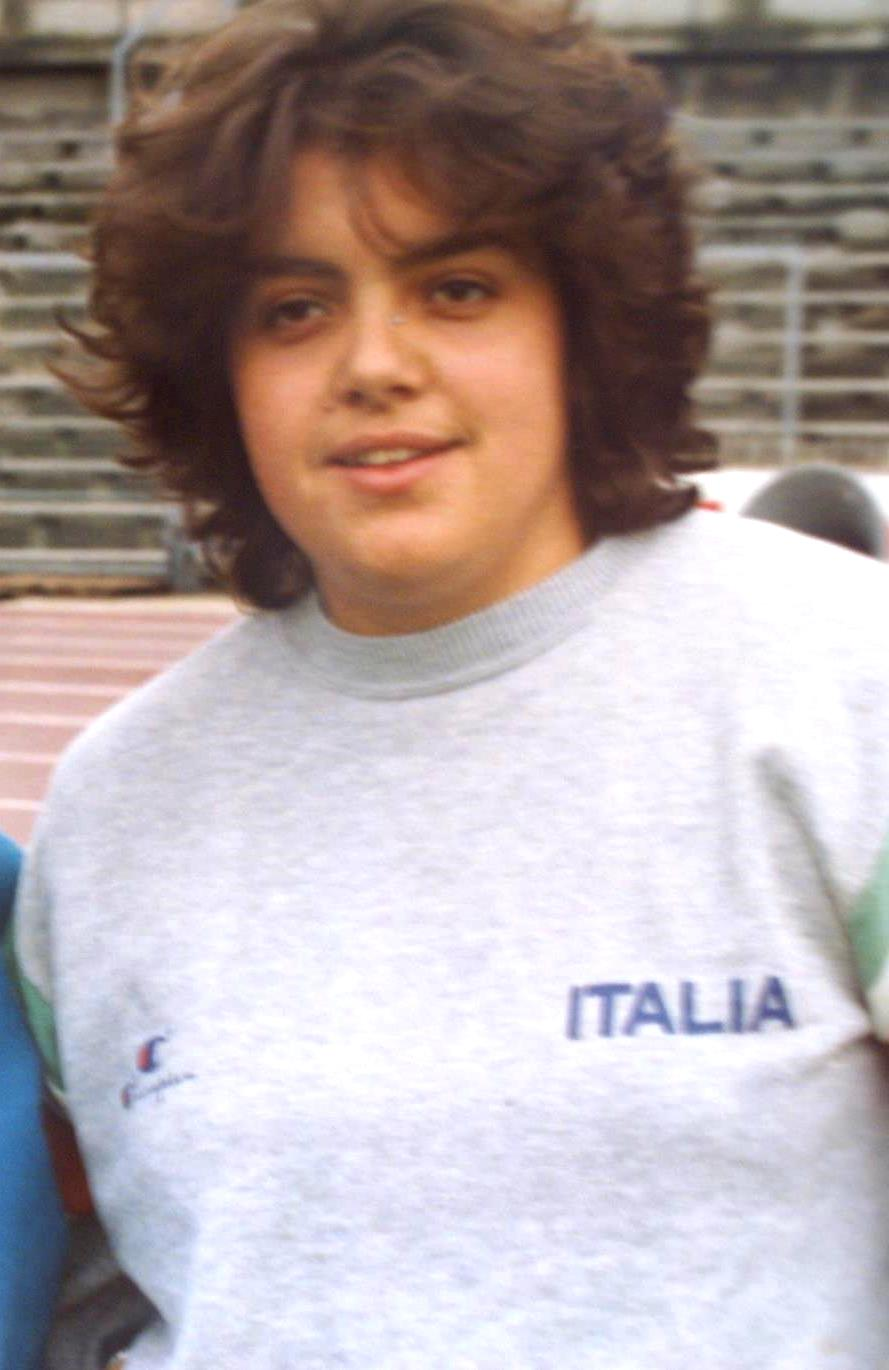
- Milanese in the 1980s.

Personal information
- National team: Italy: 21 caps (1982–1989)
- Born: 8 July 1962 (age 64) Taranto, Italy

Sport
- Sport: Athletics
- Event: Shot put
- Club: Sisport Fiat Torino

Achievements and titles
- Personal best: Shot put (1): 16.56 m (1986)

Concetta Milanese (born 8 July 1962) is a former Italian shot putter.

Milanese won seven national championships at individual senior level.

== National titles ==
- Italian Athletics Championships
  - Long put: 1982, 1983, 1985, 1988 (4)
- Italian Athletics Indoor Championships
  - Shot put: 1983. 1984, 1985 (3)
