= Yassin Bouih =

Italian middle-distance runner

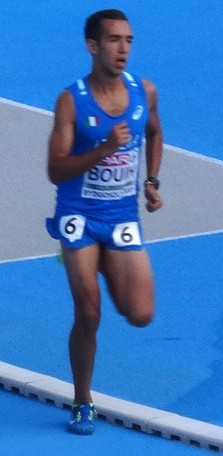
- Yassin Bouih in 2017

Personal information
- Nationality: Moroccan and Italian
- Born: 24 November 1996 (age 29) Reggio Emilia, Italy
- Height: 1.77 m (5 ft 10 in)
- Weight: 60 kg (132 lb)

Sport
- Sport: Athletics
- Events: 1500 m, 5000 m
- Club: G.A. Fiamme Gialle: Atletica Reggio (2012–2015); Fiamme Gialle (2015–)
- Coached by: Massimo Pegoretti

Achievements and titles
- Personal bests: 1500: 3:37.34 (2021); 3000 m: 8:00.32 (2019)

Yassin Bouih (born 24 November 1996) is an Italian middle-distance runner competing primarily in the 1500 metres. He represented Italy at the 2018 World Indoor Championships, finishing eleventh.

== Biography ==
Of Moroccan and later acquired Italian citizenship, Yassin's parents came to Italy from Morocco to work, first to Turin before settling in Reggio Emilia where Yassin was born.

== International competitions ==
Year	Competition	Venue	Position	Event	Notes
Representing Italy
2013	World Youth Championships	Donetsk, Ukraine	26th (h)	1500 m	4:02.12
2015	European Junior Championships	Eskilstuna, Sweden	3rd	1500 m	3:52.28
2017	European Indoor Championships	Belgrade, Serbia	8th	1500 m	3:47.95
2017	European U23 Championships	Bydgoszcz, Poland	17th (h)	1500 m	3:45.18
2018	World Indoor Championships	Birmingham, United Kingdom	11th	3000 m	8:20.84
2021	European Indoor Championships	Toruń, Poland	20th (h)	3000 m	7:56.66
2022	World Indoor Championships	Belgrade, Serbia	24th (h)	3000 m	7:58.63
2024	European Championships	Rome, Italy	14th	3000 m s'chase	8:27.29
2024	Olympic Games	Paris, France	33rd (h)	3000 m s'chase	8:40.34
2025	European Running Championships	Leuven, Belgium	50th	10 km	29:48
2026	European Championships	Birmingham, United Kingdom	16th	3000 m s'chase	8:36.15

== Personal bests ==
Outdoor

- 800 m — 1:50.88 (Milan 2014)
- 1500 metres – 3:37.34 (Carquefou, 2021)
- 3000 metres – 8:00.32 (Scandiano 2019)
- 5000 metres – 13:50.22 (Rovereto 2017)
- 10 kilometres – 29:45 (2017)

Indoor

- 1000 metres – 2:27.33 (Ancona 2015)
- 1500 metres – 3:42.78 (Vienna 2017)
- 3000 metres – 7:50.65 (Birmingham 2018)

== National titles ==
- Italian Athletics Indoor Championships
  - 1500 metres: 2017, 2018, 2020
  - 3000 metres: 2017, 2018, 2020

== See also ==
- Naturalized athletes of Italy
