= Matteo Rubbiani =

Italian pole vaulter

Personal information
- Nationality: Italian
- Born: 31 August 1978 (age 47) Carpi, Italy
- Height: 1.80 m (5 ft 11 in)
- Weight: 75 kg (165 lb)

Sport
- Country: Italy
- Sport: Athletics
- Event: Pole vault
- Club: C.S. Aeronautica Militare
- Coached by: Antonio Brandoli

Achievements and titles
- Personal best: Pole vault: 5.53 (2011)
Medal record
Military World Games
Bronze medal – third place	2007 Hyderabad	Pole vault

Matteo Rubbiani (Carpi, 31 August 1978) is an Italian pole vaulter.

== Biography ==
Matteo Rubbiani won one medal, at senior level, at the International athletics competitions. He has 4 caps in national team from 2004 to 2007, he also has won 3 times the individual national championship.

== Achievements ==
Year	Competition	Venue	Position	Event	Performance	Notes
2007	Military World Games	(India) Hyderabad	3rd	Pole vault	5.50 m	

== National titles ==
- 1 win in the pole vault at the Italian Athletics Championships (2007)
- 2 wins in the pole vault at the Italian Athletics Indoor Championships (2006, 2008)

== See also ==
- Italy at the Military World Games
