= 2013 Italian Athletics Championships =

- Dates: 26–28 July
- Host city: Milan
- Venue: Arena Civica
- Level: Senior
- Events: 42

The 2013 Italian Athletics Championships was the 103rd edition of the Italian Athletics Championships and were held in Milan on 26–28 July 2013.

== Champions ==
Track events
Event	Men	Performance	Women	Performance
100 m	Delmas Obou	10.37	Gloria Hooper	11.54
200 m	Diego Marani	20.77	Marzia Caravelli	23.16
400 m	Matteo Galvan	45.71	Chiara Bazzoni	52.57
800 m	Michele Oberti	1:51.41	Marta Milani	2:04.08
1500 m	Merihun Crespi	3:48.16	Giulia Viola	4:14.26
5000 m	Stefano La Rosa	14:11.34	Giulia Viola	16:05.39
110/100 m hs	Hassane Fofana	13.93	Marzia Caravelli	13.01
400 m hs	Eusebio Haliti	49.85	Yadisleidy Pedroso	55.26
3000 m st	Jamel Chatbi	8:40.76	Nicole Reina	10:13.89
10,000 m walk	Matteo Giupponi	40:40.42	Elisa Rigaudo	43:44.96
Field events
Event	Men	Performance	Women	Performance
Long jump	Alessio Guarini	8.00	Tania Vicenzino	6.47
Triple jump	Fabrizio Schembri	16.98	Simona La Mantia	13.86
High jump	Marco Fassinotti	2.27	Alessia Trost	1.90
Pole vault	Claudio Stecchi	5.50	Giorgia Benecchi	4.20
Shot put	Marco Dodoni	18.39	Chiara Rosa	17.45
Discus throw	Giovanni Faloci	62.56	Valentina Aniballi	56.10
Hammer throw	Nicola Vizzoni	74.10	Micaela Mariani	63.14
Javelin throw	Norbert Bonvecchio	75.36	Sara Jemai	53.45
Decathlon/Heptathlon	Michele Calvi	7460	Carolina Bianchi	5259

== See also ==
- 2013 Italian Athletics Indoor Championships
