= Enrica Cipolloni =

Italian heptathlete

Personal information
- National team: Italy: 2 caps (2010-2014)
- Born: 19 October 1990 (age 35) San Benedetto del Tronto, Italy
- Height: 1.78 m (5 ft 10 in)
- Weight: 60 kg (132 lb)

Sport
- Sport: Athletics
- Event(s): Heptathlon; High jump Long jump
- Club: G.S. Fiamme Oro
- Coached by: Andrea Calandrina

Achievements and titles
- Personal bests: Heptathlon: 5510 (2014); High jump outdoor: 1.86 m (2014); High jump indoor: 1.85 m (2012); Long jump indoor: 5.90 m (2011)

Enrica Cipolloni (born 19 October 1990) is an Italian heptathlete, who won two national championships at individual senior level from 2014 to 2018.

== Achievements ==
Year	Competition	Venue	Position	Event	Measure	Notes
2010	European Team Championships	(Norway) Bergen	11th	Long jump	5.76 m	PB

== National titles ==
- Italian Athletics Indoor Championships
  - Pentathlon: 2014, 2018
