= Julaika Nicoletti =

Italian shot putter (born 1988)

Personal information
- National team: Italy
- Born: 20 March 1988 (age 38) Rimini, Italy
- Height: 1.78 m (5 ft 10 in)
- Weight: 90 kg (198 lb)

Sport
- Sport: Athletics
- Event: Shot put
- Club: G.S. Forestale; C.S. Carabinieri

Achievements and titles
- Personal best: Shot put: 17.97 m (2015)

Julaika Nicoletti (born 20 March 1988) is an Italian female shot putter who won two national championships at individual senior level. She finished at 13th place in the 2015 indoor seasonal world lists in the shot put.

== Biography ==
She competed in three editions of the European Athletics Championships (two outdoor and one indoor).

== Achievements ==
Year	Competition	Venue	Position	Event	Measure	Notes
2012	European Championships	(Finland) Helsinki	Qual (15th)	Shot put	15.94 m	
2013	European Indoor Championships	(Sweden) Gothenburg	Qual (16th)	Shot put	16.28 m	
2016	European Championships	(Netherlands) Amsterdam	Qual (23rd)	Shot put	15.81 m	

== National titles ==
- Italian Athletics Indoor Championships
  - Shot put: 2010, 2012

== See also ==
- Italian all-time lists - Shot put
