= Emanuele Catania =

Italian long jumper

Personal information
- Nationality: Italian
- Born: 3 October 1988 (age 37) Rome, Italy
- Height: 1.85 m (6 ft 1 in)
- Weight: 78 kg (172 lb)

Sport
- Country: Italy
- Sport: Athletics
- Event: Long jump
- Club: G.S. Fiamme Gialle
- Coached by: Roberto Pericoli

Achievements and titles
- Personal bests: Long jump: 7.92 m (2013); Long jump (i): 7.96 m (2013)
Medal record
Mediterranean Games
Bronze medal – third place	2013 Mersin	Long jump

Emanuele Catania (born 3 October 1988) is an Italian long jumper.

== Biography ==
Emanuele Catania won a medal at the 2013 Mediterranean Games.

== Achievements ==
Year	Competition	Venue	Position	Event	Time	Notes
2013	European Indoor Championships	(Sweden) Gothenburg	Qual	Long jump	7.78 m	
2013	Mediterranean Games	(Turkey) Mersin	3rd	Long jump	7.92 m	=

== National titles ==
- 1 win in the long jump outdoor (2014)
- 1 win in the long jump indoor (2015)

== See also ==
- Italy at the 2013 Mediterranean Games
