= Alessandro Sinno =

Italian male pole vaulter (born 1994)

Personal information
- Nationality: Italian
- Born: 17 July 1994 (age 31) Rome
- Height: 1.86 m (6 ft 1 in)
- Weight: 100 kg (220 lb)

Sport
- Country: Italy
- Sport: Athletics
- Event: Pole vault
- Club: C.S. Aeronautica Militare

Achievements and titles
- Personal best: Pole vault: 5.55 m (2018)
Medal record
Mediterranean U23 Championships
Bronze medal – third place	2016 Tunis	Pole vault

Alessandro Sinno (born 17 July 1994) is an Italian male pole vaulter.

== Biography ==
He has won three times his country's senior national championship, and with his new personal best, ranked in the top 60, at 47th place, on the IAAF world leading list at the 11 July 2018.

== Personal best ==
- Pole vault: 5.55 m ( (Italy) Foggia, 27 June 2018)

== Achievements ==
Year	Competition	Venue	Position	Event	Measure	Notes
2016	Mediterranean U23 Championships	(Tunisia) Tunis	3rd	Pole vault	5.26 m	

== National titles ==
- Italian Athletics Indoor Championships
  - Pole vault: 2014, 2016, 2019
