= Marta Zenoni =

Italian middle-distance runner

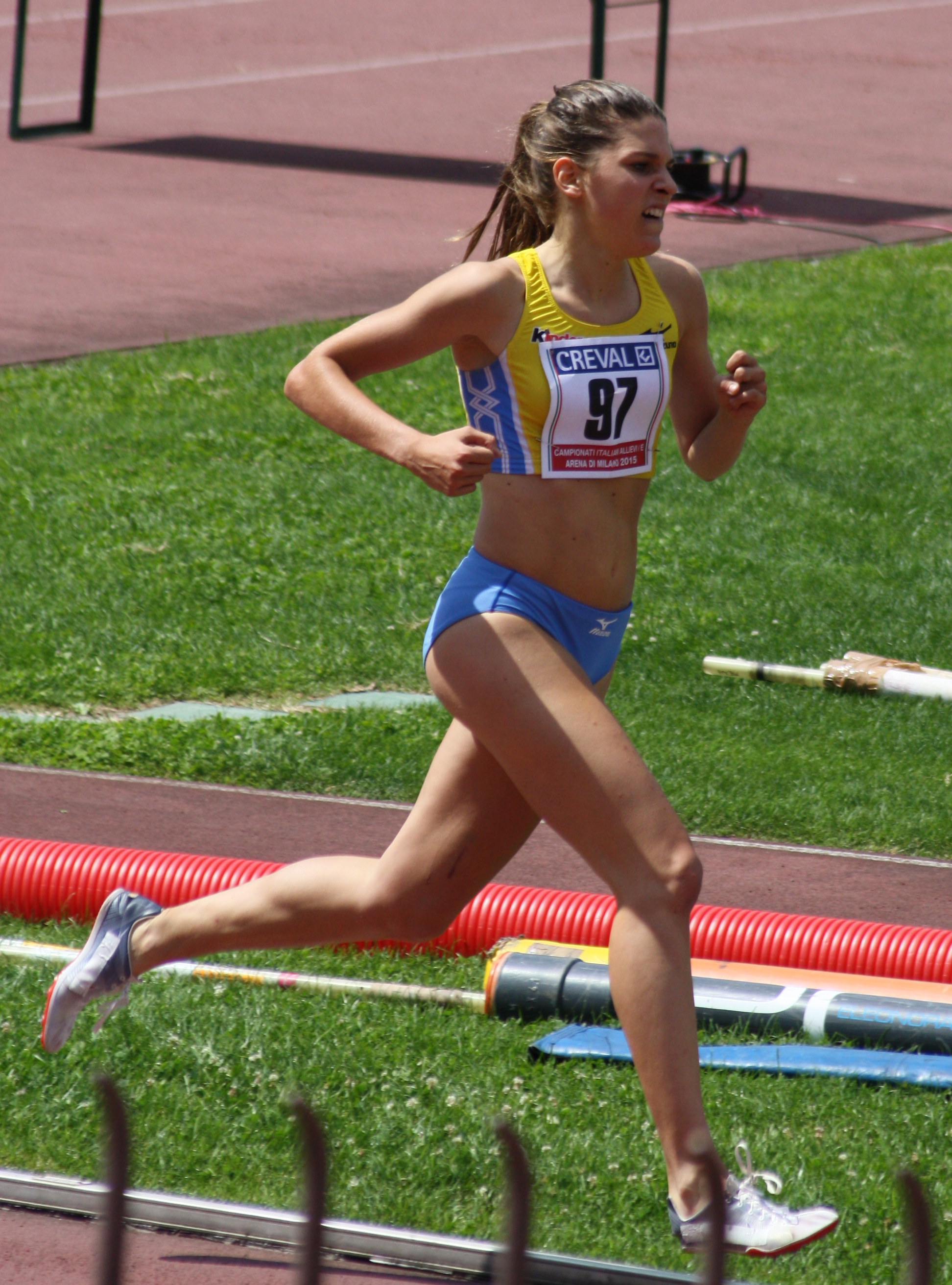

Personal information
- National team: Italy (1 cap)
- Born: 9 March 1999 (age 27) Bergamo, Italy
- Agent: Federico Rosa
- Height: 1.81 m (5 ft 11 in)
- Weight: 59 kg (130 lb)

Sport
- Sport: Athletics
- Event: Middle-distance running
- Club: Bergamo 1959
- Coached by: Saro Naso

Achievements and titles
- Personal bests: 800 m: 2:01.91 (2016); 1500 m: 4:03.00 (2024); 3000 m: 8:41.72 (2025); 5000 m: 15:52.89 (2019)
Medal record
European Team Championships
Silver medal – second place	2019 Bydgoszcz	3000 m
European Cross Country Championships
Gold medal – first place	2024 Antalya	Mixed relay
World Youth Championships
Bronze medal – third place	2015 Cali	800 m
European U23 Championships
Silver medal – second place	2021 Tallinn	1500 m
Bronze medal – third place	2019 Gävle	1500 m

Marta Zenoni (born 9 March 1999) is an Italian middle-distance runner who won seven national titles at individual senior level.

== Biography ==
At international senior level she won silver medal at the 2019 European Team Championships and she also won two bronze medals at international youth level.

== Achievements ==
Year	Competition	Venue	Rank	Event	Time	Notes
2015	World Youth Championships	(Colombia) Cali	3rd	800 m	2:04.15	
2019	European U23 Championships	(Sweden) Gävle	3rd	1500 m	4:23.96	
2019	European Team Championships	(Poland) Bydgoszcz	2nd	3000 m	9:08.34	

== National titles ==
Zenoni won seven national championships at individual senior level in six different events.

- Italian Athletics Championships
  - 800 m: 2015, 2025
  - 1500 m: 2019
  - 5000 m: 2019
- Italian Cross Country Championships
  - Short race: 2019
- Italian Athletics Indoor Championships
  - 800 m: 2016
  - 1500 m: 2016
