= Marco Boni (pole vaulter) =

Italian pole vaulter

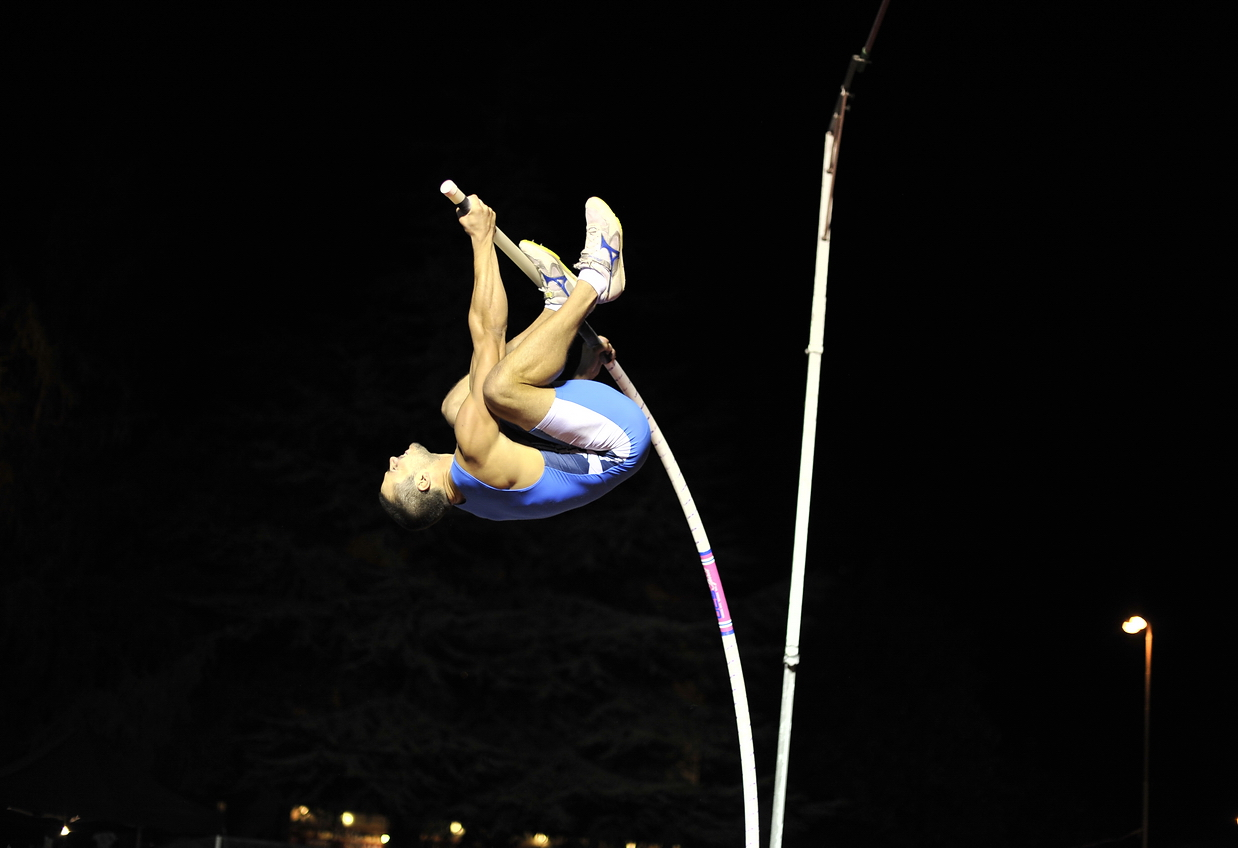
- Marco Boni in 2009

Personal information
- Nationality: Italian
- Born: May 21, 1984 (age 42) Camposampiero, Italy
- Height: 1.83 m (6 ft 0 in)
- Weight: 87 kg (192 lb)

Sport
- Country: Italy
- Sport: Athletics
- Event: Pole vault
- Club: C.S. Aeronautica Militare

Achievements and titles
- Personal best: Pole vault: 5.60 m (2012)

Marco Boni (Camposampiero, 21 May 1984) is an Italian pole vaulter.

== Biography ==
In 2012 he qualified, with his personal best of 5.60 m, for the 2012 European Athletics Championships in Helsinki.

== Achievements ==
Year	Competition	Venue	Position	Event	Performance	Notes
2012	European Championships	(Finland) Helsinki	Qual.	Pole vault	NM	

== Personal best ==
- Pole vault: 5.60 m (Fermo, 4 March 2012)
