= Merihun Crespi =

Personal information
- Nationality: Italian
- Born: 15 December 1988 (age 37) Blaten, Ethiopia
- Height: 1.72 m (5 ft 8 in)
- Weight: 63 kg (139 lb)

Sport
- Country: Italy
- Sport: Athletics
- Event: Middle-distance running
- Club: C.S. Esercito
- Coached by: Giorgio Rondelli

Achievements and titles
- Personal bests: 1500 m: 3:37.67 (2011); 1500 m indoor: 3:42.80 (2012)
Medal record
Youth level
European Cross Country Championships
Gold medal – first place	2006 San Giorgio su Legnano	Team junior
European U20 Championships
Bronze medal – third place	2007 Hengelo	1500 m

Merihun Crespi (born 15 December 1988) is a born Ethiopian male Italian long-distance runner who won three times his country's senior national championship and an individual bronze medal at the European Athletics U20 Championships.

== Biography ==
Born in Blaten, Ethiopia, adopted when he was 3 by Italian family. In 2009 he was azzurro at the Decanation in Paris (7th) and since 2010 he is part of the team trained by Giorgio Rondelli at the XXV Aprile field in Milan. He graduated from the Liceo Scientifico-Tecnologico, he loves music and reading: among all the champions he chooses Paul Tergat.

== Achievements ==
Year	Competition	Venue	Position	Event	Time	Notes
2007	World Cross Country Championships	(Kenya) Mombasa	60th	Junior race (8 km)	27:19	
2007	European U20 Championships	(Netherlands) Hengelo	3rd	1500 metres	4:01.83	

== National titles ==
He won three national championships at individual senior level.

- Italian Athletics Championships
  - 1500 metres: 2011, 2013
- Italian Athletics Indoor Championships
  - 1500 metres: 2012

== See also ==
- Naturalized athletes of Italy
