= Abdellah Haidane =

Moroccan-born Italian middle-distance runners

Personal information
- Nationality: Italian
- Born: 28 March 1989 (age 37) Hiadna, Morocco

Sport
- Country: Italy
- Sport: Athletics
- Event: Middle distance running
- Club: Pro Patria Milano
- Coached by: Giorgio Rondelli

Achievements and titles
- Personal bests: 1500 m: 3:39.11 (2012); 1500 m (i): 3:40.21 (2012); 3000 m (i): 7:48.60 (2014)

Abdellah Haidane (born 28 March 1989) is a Moroccan-born Italian middle distance runner.

== Biography ==
He is coached by historian coach of Alberto Cova, Giorgio Rondelli. His personal best in 1500 metres indoor is the ninth best Italian performance of all-time.

In 2014, Haidane tested positive for the stimulant Tuaminoheptane and was banned from sports for four months.

== Achievements ==
Year	Competition	Venue	Position	Event	Time	Notes
2012	European Championships	(Spain) Barcelona	8th	1500 metres	3:47.79	
2013	European Indoor Championships	(Sweden) Gothenburg	Heat	3000 metres	8:03.20	

== National titles ==
He has won 4 times the individual national championship.

- 1 win in the 1500 metres indoor (2014)
- 3 win in the 3000 metres indoor (2012, 2013, 2014)
