= Martina Lorenzetto =

Italian long jumper

Personal information
- National team: Italy
- Born: 18 April 1992 (age 34) Treviso, Italy

Sport
- Sport: Athletics
- Event: Long jump
- Club: Bracco Atletica
- Coached by: Barbara Lah

Achievements and titles
- Personal best: Long jump: 6.49 m (2015)

Martina Lorenzetto (born 18 April 1992) is an Italian long jumper.

Lorenzetto won two national championships at individual senior level.

== National titles ==
- Italian Athletics Championships
  - Long jump: 2015
- Italian Athletics Indoor Championships
  - Long jump: 2016
