= 2009 World Championships in Athletics – Women's triple jump =

Women's Triple Jump event at the 2009 World Championships, Berlin

The Women's Triple Jump at the 2009 World Championships in Athletics will be held at the Olympic Stadium on August 15 and August 17. Cuban Yargelis Savigne had registered nine of the ten farthest jumps pre-championships and was seen as a strong favourite. The twice world gold medallist Tatyana Lebedeva and world-leader Nadezhda Alekhina were also considered possible medallists. The reigning Olympic champion, Françoise Mbango, had failed to perform well in the buildup to the championships and did not start the competition.

In the qualifying rounds, Asian record holder Xie Limei had the biggest jump of the day with 14.62 m, improving on her previous season's best by more than 40 cm. Savigne, Lebedeva, and Mabel Gay were the only other athletes to reach the 14.45 m automatic qualifying mark in what was a largely modest qualifying round.

The jumps in the final of the competition were not of the standard shown in previous years, and favourite Savigne was largely unchallenged. She took the gold with a best of 14.95 m to become only the second athlete to win consecutive world titles in the event (after Lebedeva's 2001 and 2003 double). Second-placed Gay (14.61) won her first ever World Championship medal and Pyatykh reached the podium with a mark of 14.58 m. Biljana Topic set a Serbian record of 14.52 m for fourth place, but no other athletes managed beyond 14.50 m.

== Medalists ==
Gold	Yargelis Savigne; Cuba (CUB)
Silver	Mabel Gay; Cuba (CUB)
Bronze	Anna Pyatykh; Russia (RUS)

== Records ==
World record	Inessa Kravets (UKR)	15.50	Gothenburg, Sweden	10 August 1995
Championship record	Inessa Kravets (UKR)	15.50	Gothenburg, Sweden	10 August 1995
World leading	Nadezhda Bazhenova-Alekhina (RUS)	15.14	Cheboksary, Russia	26 July 2009
African record	Françoise Mbango Etone (CMR)	15.39	Beijing, China	17 August 2008
Asian record	Olga Rypakova (KAZ)	15.11	Beijing, China	17 August 2008
North American record	Yamilé Aldama (CUB)	15.29	Rome, Italy	11 July 2003
South American record	Keila Costa (BRA)	14.57	São Paulo, Brazil	9 June 2007
European record	Inessa Kravets (UKR)	15.50	Gothenburg, Sweden	10 August 1995
Oceanian record	Nicole Mladenis (AUS)	14.04	Hobart, Australia	9 March 2002

== Qualification standards ==
A standard	B standard
14.20m	14.00m

== Schedule ==
Date	Time	Round
August 15, 2009	11:00	Qualification
August 17, 2009	20:00	Final

== Results ==
=== Qualification ===
Qualification: Qualifying Performance 14.45 (Q) or at least 12 best performers (q) advance to the final.

Rank	Group	Athlete	Nationality	#1	#2	#3	Result	Notes
1	B	Xie Limei	China	14.62			14.62	Q, SB
2	A	Yargelis Savigne	Cuba	x	14.53		14.53	Q
3	B	Mabel Gay	Cuba	x	14.53		14.53	Q
4	A	Tatyana Lebedeva	Russia	~~14.45~~			~~14.45~~	Q, Doping
5	B	Biljana Topić	Serbia	14.37	13.80	–	14.37	q, SB
6	A	Teresa Nzola Meso Ba	France	x	13.87	14.32	14.32	q
7	B	Cristina Bujin	Romania	14.22	12.82	14.29	14.29	q
8	A	Anna Pyatykh	Russia	x	14.01	14.27	14.27	q
9	A	Dana Velďáková	Slovakia	x	14.25	14.20	14.25	q
10	B	Trecia-Kaye Smith	Jamaica	x	x	14.21	14.21	q
11	B	Gisele de Oliveira	Brazil	13.70	13.79	14.14	14.14	q
12	B	Olga Rypakova	Kazakhstan	14.02	x	14.13	14.13	q
13	A	Yamilé Aldama	Sudan	13.96	13.83	14.11	14.11	
14	A	Petia Dacheva	Bulgaria	13.63	13.56	14.11	14.11	
15	A	Kimberly Williams	Jamaica	x	14.08	x	14.08	PB
16	B	Małgorzata Trybańska	Poland	x	14.06	13.80	14.06	
17	B	Shakeema Walker-Welsch	United States	x	x	14.01	14.01	
18	B	Svitlana Mamyeyeva	Ukraine	13.92	13.35	13.70	13.92	
19	A	Snežana Rodic	Slovenia	13.92	x	x	13.92	
20	A	Svetlana Bolshakova	Belgium	13.89	x	13.73	13.89	
21	A	Magdelín Martínez	Italy	13.80	13.72	13.87	13.87	
22	A	Martina Šestáková	Czech Republic	x	13.69	13.84	13.84	
23	A	Irina Litvinenko	Kazakhstan	13.63	13.77	13.82	13.82	
24	B	Nataliya Yastrebova	Ukraine	x	13.58	13.74	13.74	
25	B	Athanasia Perra	Greece	13.69	x	x	13.69	
25	B	Marija Šestak	Slovenia	x	x	13.69	13.69	
27	A	Shani Marks	United States	x	x	13.67	13.67	
28	B	Nadezhda Alekhina	Russia	x	x	13.60	13.60	
29	A	Paraskevi Papahristou	Greece	13.58	x	13.58	13.58	
30	B	Vanessa Gladone	France	13.51	13.42	13.40	13.51	
31	A	Liliya Kulyk	Ukraine	13.37	13.41	13.41	13.41	
32	A	Erica McLain	United States	13.34	x	13.39	13.39	
33	A	Patricia Sylvester	Grenada	13.22	13.05	12.98	13.22	
34	B	Katja Demut	Germany	x	11.38	x	11.38	
	B	Françoise Mbango Etone	Cameroon				DNS	

Key: DNS = Did not start, PB = Personal best, Q = qualification by place in heat, q = qualification by overall place, SB = Seasonal best

=== Final ===
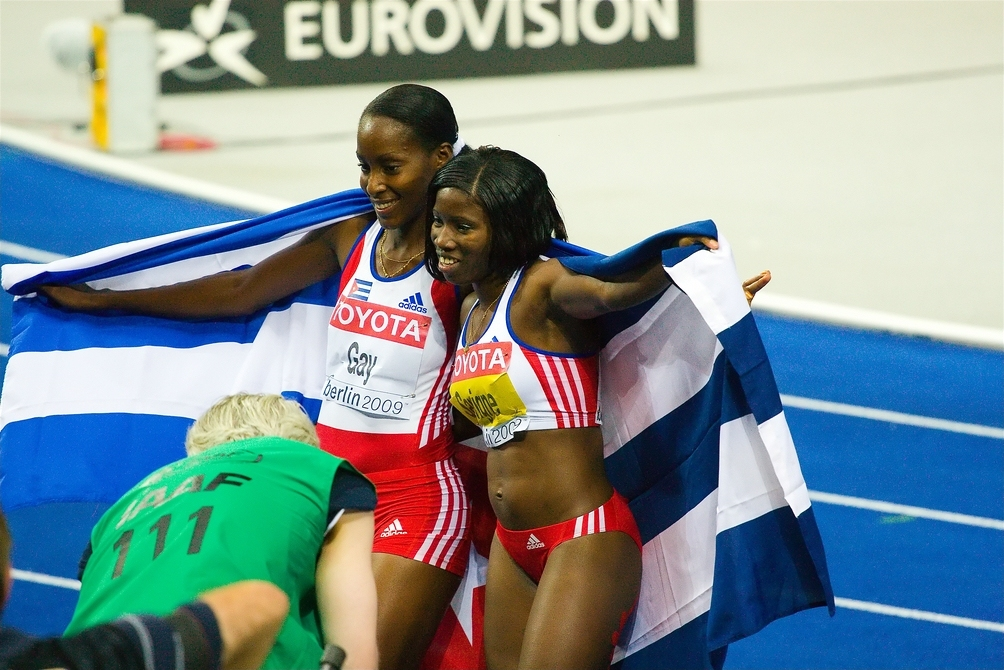
Cubans Yargelis Savigne and Mabel Gay took the gold and silver.

Rank	Athlete	Nationality	#1	#2	#3	#4	#5	#6	Result	Notes
1st place, gold medalist(s)	Yargelis Savigne	Cuba	14.45	14.14	14.89	14.85	14.95	14.39	14.95	
2nd place, silver medalist(s)	Mabel Gay	Cuba	13.87	14.50	x	14.61	14.48	14.04	14.61	SB
3rd place, bronze medalist(s)	Anna Pyatykh	Russia	13.72	14.23	13.66	14.58	14.46	14.53	14.58	
4	Biljana Topić	Serbia	14.21	14.38	14.27	14.52	14.43	14.10	14.52	NR
5	Trecia-Kaye Smith	Jamaica	14.31	x	x	14.41	14.48	x	14.48	SB
6	Cristina Bujin	Romania	14.26	14.00	14.03	14.20	14.16	14.15	14.26	
7	Dana Velďáková	Slovakia	14.25	x	12.86	14.14	14.19	14.13	14.25	
8	Xie Limei	China	14.16	11.46	14.06				14.16	
9	Olga Rypakova	Kazakhstan	x	13.91	13.71				13.91	
10	Teresa Nzola Meso Ba	France	13.77	13.79	x				13.79	
11	Gisele de Oliveira	Brazil	x	13.19	–				13.19	
DQ	Tatyana Lebedeva	Russia	~~x~~	~~14.37~~	~~14.23~~	~~14.22~~	~~14.26~~	~~14.28~~	~~14.37~~	Doping

Key: NR = National record, SB = Seasonal best
