= Athletics at the 2007 Pan American Games – Women's triple jump =

Women's triple jump at the Pan American Games

The women's triple jump event at the 2007 Pan American Games was held on July 27.

== Results ==
Rank	Athlete	Nationality	#1	#2	#3	#4	#5	#6	Result	Notes
1st place, gold medalist(s)	Yargelis Savigne	Cuba	14.33	14.46	14.54	14.78	14.80	x	14.80	GR
2nd place, silver medalist(s)	Keila Costa	Brazil	x	14.36	13.89	14.25	14.38	14.30	14.38	
3rd place, bronze medalist(s)	Mabel Gay	Cuba	13.73	13.86	x	x	14.26	x	14.26	
4	Maurren Maggi	Brazil	14.07	13.75	13.95	13.98	12.55	14.07	14.07	
5	Shani Marks	United States	X	13.71	11.85	13.92	13.34	13.67	13.92	
6	Yvette Lewis	United States	X	13.49	X	X	13.40	X	13.49	
7	Ayanna Alexander	Trinidad and Tobago	13.21	X	X	12.60	13.00	12.27	13.21	PB
8	Michelle Vaughn	Guyana	X	13.18	X	12.88	12.68	12.76	13.18	
9	Lorena Mina	Ecuador	11.84	X	12.22				12.22	
10	Sheriffa Whyte	Saint Kitts and Nevis	11.53	11.58	X				11.58	
