= Olga Rypakova =

Kazakhstani athlete (born 1984)

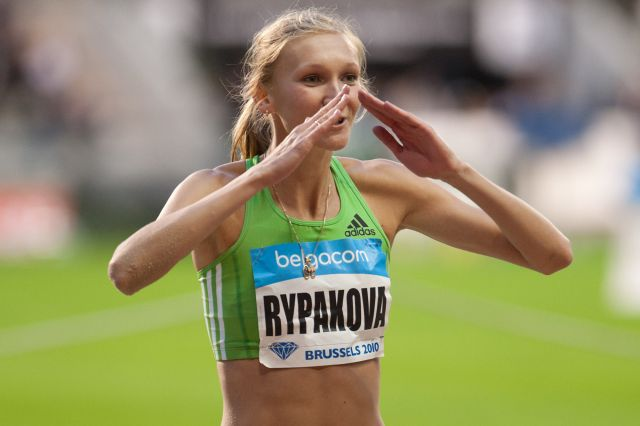
- Olga Rypakova during 2010 Memorial Van Damme

Personal information
- Full name: Ольга Сергеевна Рыпакова
- Nationality: Kazakhstani
- Born: 30 November 1984 (age 41) Oskemen, East Kazakhstan Region, Kazakh SSR, Soviet Union
- Height: 1.83 m (6 ft 0 in)
- Weight: 62 kg (137 lb)

Sport
- Country: Kazakhstan
- Sport: Athletics
- Events: Heptathlon, triple jump, long jump
Medal record
Women's athletics
Representing Kazakhstan
Olympic Games
Gold medal – first place	2012 London	Triple jump
Silver medal – second place	2008 Beijing	Triple jump
Bronze medal – third place	2016 Rio de Janeiro	Triple jump
World Championships
Silver medal – second place	2011 Daegu	Triple jump
Bronze medal – third place	2015 Beijing	Triple jump
Bronze medal – third place	2017 London	Triple jump
World Indoor Championships
Gold medal – first place	2010 Doha	Triple jump
Silver medal – second place	2012 Istanbul	Triple jump
Bronze medal – third place	2008 Valencia	Triple jump
Asian Games
Gold medal – first place	2006 Doha	Heptathlon
Gold medal – first place	2010 Guangzhou	Triple jump
Gold medal – first place	2014 Incheon	Triple jump
Gold medal – first place	2018 Jakarta-Palembang	Triple jump
Silver medal – second place	2010 Guangzhou	Long jump
Bronze medal – third place	2006 Doha	Long jump
Asian Championships
Gold medal – first place	2007 Amman	Long jump
Gold medal – first place	2007 Amman	Triple jump
Asian Indoor Championships
Gold medal – first place	2006 Pattaya	Pentathlon
Gold medal – first place	2008 Doha	Triple jump
Gold medal – first place	2016 Doha	Triple jump
Bronze medal – third place	2016 Doha	Long jump
Asian Indoor Games
Gold medal – first place	2005 Pattaya	Pentathlon
Gold medal – first place	2009 Hanoi	Long jump
Gold medal – first place	2009 Hanoi	Triple jump
Gold medal – first place	2017 Ashgabat	Long jump
Gold medal – first place	2017 Ashgabat	Triple jump
Military World Games
Gold medal – first place	2019 Wuhan	Triple jump

Olga Sergeyevna Rypakova (née Alekseyeva; Russian: Ольга Сергеевна Рыпакова); 30 November 1984) is a former Kazakhstani track and field athlete. Originally a heptathlete, she switched to focus on the long jump and began to compete in the triple jump after 2007. Her first successes came in the combined events at Asian competitions – she won the women's pentathlon at the 2005 Asian Indoor Games and took the heptathlon gold at the 2006 Asian Games the following year.

She competed in both jumping events at the 2008 Beijing Olympics and finished fourth in the triple jump with an Asian record of 15.11 metres. Rypakova has represented Kazakhstan at the 2007 and 2009 World Championships in Athletics. She reached the world podium for the first time at the 2010 IAAF World Indoor Championships, where she took gold with an Asian indoor record jump of 15.14 m. She won the gold medal in triple jump at the 2012 London Olympics.

In February 2023, Rypakova announced the end of her professional sports career.

== Career ==
=== Early career ===
Born in Ust-Kamenogorsk, she entered her first world junior competition at the age of sixteen and finished eleventh in the long jump qualifying round of the 2000 World Junior Championships in Athletics. She was more successful in the heptathlon: she finished fourth at the 2001 World Youth Championships in Athletics and went on to take the silver at the following year's World Junior Championships behind the emerging Carolina Klüft. Rypakova also became Kazakhstan's national heptathlon champion that year. She persisted with combined events and started competing on the international circuit, finishing fifth with a season's best at the Multistars competition in 2003, and she became the national indoor champion in the women's pentathlon in 2004.

Rypakova's first major championships appearances came in 2005: in September she took part in the long jump at the 2005 Asian Athletics Championships in Incheon, finishing in fourth place. Two months later she won her first gold, topping the podium in the indoor pentathlon at the 2005 Asian Indoor Games. Continuing in the pentathlon, she went on to win the gold at the 2006 Asian Indoor Athletics Championships setting an Asian and championships record of 4582 points for the event. Reaching the indoor world stage for the first time, she attended the 2006 IAAF World Indoor Championships but she did not improve further and took seventh place with 4368 points.

She represented Asia for the first time at the 2006 IAAF World Cup team competition, although she managed only 6.21 m in the long jump competition, finishing in eighth. She made improvements, however, in the weeks following the World Cup by jumping 6.63 m (a new personal best) for second place at the Colorful Daegu Athletics Meeting. She pushed herself beyond the normal seven events at the 2006 Asian Games by winning the heptathlon gold medal with 5955 points, and then participating in the individual long jump competition. She won the long jump bronze medal a day after topping the podium in the heptathlon competition.

=== Major championship gold ===
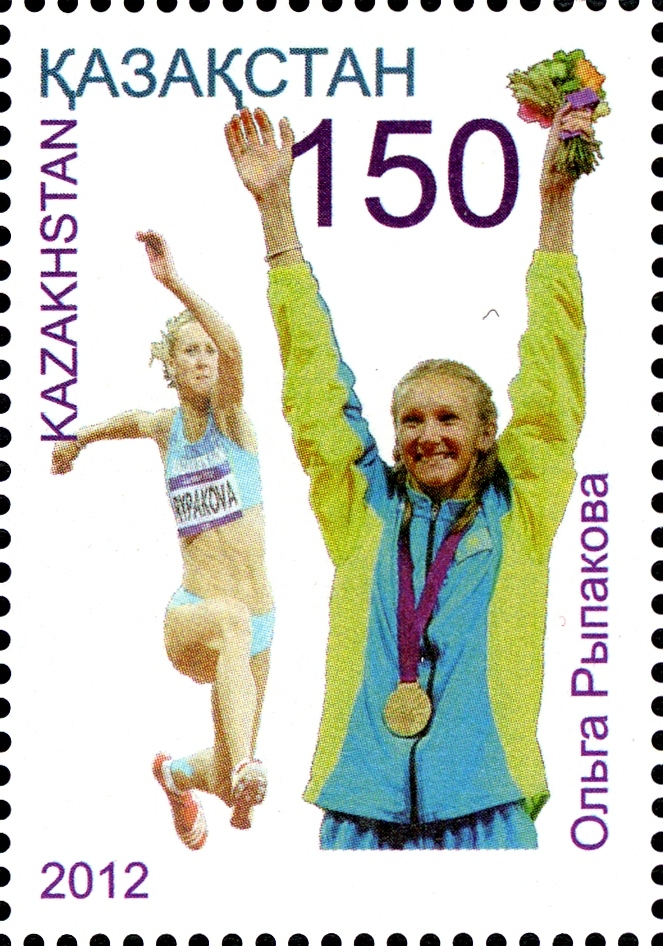
Olga Rypakova on a 2013 Kazakhstani stamp

A quick succession of major competitions defined her 2007 season. She began by scoring two golds in the horizontal jumps at the 2007 Asian Athletics Championships in July, which included a championship record and national record of 14.69 m in the triple jump. In August at the 2007 Summer Universiade, she brought her country its first ever athletics gold medal at the competition with a personal best of 6.85 m in the long jump.

Three weeks later, she took part in her first ever World Championships in Athletics: she opted to contest the triple jump and she finished fourth in the qualifying. However, she could not match that performance in the final round and finished in eleventh overall. She intended to close the year with an appearance at the 2007 Asian Indoor Games but she withdrew from the competition.

Her 2008 season began with further indoor success: she won her second gold and set her second championship record at the 2008 Asian Indoor Athletics Championships, this time in the triple jump with a mark of 14.23 m. The 2008 IAAF World Indoor Championships followed shortly and she came close to the podium in the triple jump competition but while her jump of 14.58 m was enough to set an indoor Asian record, it was not enough to push Marija Šestak out of the bronze medal position. Similar bitter-sweet results awaited her at the 2008 Summer Olympics, her first time representing Kazakhstan at the Summer Olympics. She entered both the horizontal jump competitions and recorded a new Asian record of 15.11 m in the Olympic triple jump contest. In spite of this, she remained some ten centimetres behind the bronze medallist Hrysopiyi Devetzi of Greece. Her Olympics came to a close after a modest set of jumps in the qualifiers of the long jump competition left her out of the final.

She took part in her second outdoor world championships the following year, but she could not match her previous form and finished in tenth place overall in the 2009 women's triple jump competition with a best mark of 13.91 m. Despite this lacklustre performance on the world stage, she remained dominant in continental competition and won both the long jump and triple jump gold medals at the 2009 Asian Indoor Games (setting two Games records and helping Kazakhstan top the athletics medal table in the process). Competing at her final championships of that year, she retained her triple jump title at the 2009 Asian Athletics Championships, beating Xu Tingting and Irina Litvinenko with a jump of 14.53 m.

8 November 2012 Kazakhstan London Olympic champion Olga Rypakova got the Olympic Council of Asia award as the best Asian athlete, along with Zulfiya Chinshanlo and Ilya Ilyin.

=== World indoor champion ===
She became the long and triple jump national indoor champion at the beginning of 2010, and she opted to compete in the triple jump at the 2010 IAAF World Indoor Championships. She completed a series of personal best jumps in the final, battling against the defending champion Yargelis Savigne for the gold medal. Having sealed first place with a fourth round jump of 14.93 m and being relieved of the competitive pressure, her final jump saw her reach a new level: she jumped 15.14 m – a result that placed her as the third longest jumper indoors after former world champions Ashia Hansen and Tatyana Lebedeva.

== Achievements ==
Year	Competition	Venue	Position	Event	Notes
Representing Kazakhstan
2000	World Junior Championships	Santiago, Chile	23rd (q)	Long jump	5.63 m (+0.1 m/s)
2001	World Youth Championships	Debrecen, Hungary	4th	Heptathlon (youth)	5198 pts
2002	World Junior Championships	Kingston, Jamaica	2nd	Heptathlon	5727 pts
2003	Universiade	Daegu, South Korea	8th	Heptathlon	5690 pts
2005	Universiade	İzmir, Turkey	14th (q)	Long jump	6.11 m
2005	Asian Championships	Incheon, South Korea	4th	Long jump	6.50 m
2005	Asian Indoor Games	Bangkok, Thailand	1st	Pentathlon	3954 pts
2006	Asian Indoor Championships	Pattaya, Thailand	1st	Pentathlon	4582 pts
2006	World Indoor Championships	Moscow, Russia	7th	Pentathlon	4368 pts
2006	World Cup	Athens, Greece	8th	Long jump	6.21 m
2006	Asian Games	Doha, Qatar	3rd	Long jump	6.49 m
2006	Asian Games	Doha, Qatar	1st	Heptathlon	5955 pts
2007	Asian Championships	Amman, Jordan	1st	Long jump	6.66 m (w)
2007	Asian Championships	Amman, Jordan	1st	Triple jump	14.69 m (CR)
2007	Universiade	Bangkok, Thailand	1st	Long jump	6.85 m (PB)
2007	World Championships	Osaka, Japan	10th	Triple jump	14.32 m
2008	Asian Indoor Championships	Doha, Qatar	1st	Triple jump	14.23 m
2008	World Indoor Championships	Valencia, Spain	3rd	Triple jump	14.58 m
2008	Olympic Games	Beijing, China	29th (q)	Long jump	6.30 m
2008	Olympic Games	Beijing, China	2nd	Triple jump	15.11 m
2009	World Championships	Berlin, Germany	11th	Triple jump	13.91 m
2009	Asian Indoor Games	Hanoi, Vietnam	1st	Long jump	6.58 m
2009	Asian Indoor Games	Hanoi, Vietnam	1st	Triple jump	14.40 m
2009	Asian Championships	Guangzhou, China	1st	Triple jump	14.53 m
2010	World Indoor Championships	Doha, Qatar	1st	Triple jump	15.14 m (AR)
2010	Continental Cup	Split, Croatia	1st	Triple jump	15.25 m (AR, CR)
2010	Asian Games	Guangzhou, China	2nd	Long jump	6.50 m
2010	Asian Games	Guangzhou, China	1st	Triple jump	14.78 m
2011	World Championships	Daegu, South Korea	2nd	Triple jump	14.89 m
2012	World Indoor Championships	Istanbul, Turkey	2nd	Triple jump	14.63 m
2012	Olympic Games	London, United Kingdom	1st	Triple jump	14.98 m
2012	IAAF Diamond League		1st	Triple jump	details
2014	Asian Games	Incheon, South Korea	1st	Triple jump	14.32 m
2015	World Championships	Beijing, China	3rd	Triple jump	14.77 m
2016	Asian Indoor Championships	Doha, Qatar	3rd	Long jump	6.22 m
2016	Asian Indoor Championships	Doha, Qatar	1st	Triple jump	14.32 m
2016	Olympic Games	Rio de Janeiro, Brazil	3rd	Triple jump	14.74 m
2017	World Championships	London, United Kingdom	3rd	Triple jump	14.77 m
2017	Asian Indoor Games	Ashgabat, Turkmenistan	1st	Long jump	6.43 m
2017	Asian Indoor Games	Ashgabat, Turkmenistan	1st	Triple jump	14.32 m
2017	IAAF Diamond League		1st	Triple jump	details
2018	Asian Games	Jakarta, Indonesia	1st	Triple jump	14.26 m
2019	World Championships	Doha, Qatar	13th (q)	Triple jump	14.09 m
2021	Olympic Games	Tokyo, Japan	24th (q)	Triple jump	13.69 m

== Personal bests ==
Her personal best long jump is 6.85 metres, achieved at the 2007 Universiade in Bangkok. In the triple jump she has a best of 15.25 metres, achieved at the 2010 IAAF Continental Cup in Split; this is the Asian record for the event. She also holds the current Asian indoor record in the triple jump with a mark of 15.14 m, achieved at the 2010 IAAF World Indoor Championships. Her best of 4582 points in the indoor pentathlon is also an Asian indoor record. She has a heptathlon best of 6113 points, set in Almaty in 2006.

Type	Event	Time	Date	Place	Notes
Outdoor	Long Jump	6.85m	10 August 2007	Bangkok, Thailand	
Outdoor	Triple Jump	15.25m	4 September 2010	Split, Croatia	7th of all time
Indoor	Long Jump	6.58m	2 November 2009	Hanoi, Vietnam	
Indoor	Triple Jump	15.14m	13 March 2010	Doha, Qatar	3rd of all time

- All information taken from IAAF profile.

Olympic Games
Preceded by Ruslan Zhaparov	Flagbearer for Kazakhstan (with Kamshybek Kunkabayev); Tokyo 2020	Succeeded by Olga Safronova; Aslanbek Shymbergenov
