= 2008 IAAF World Indoor Championships – Women's triple jump =

At the 2008 IAAF World Indoor Championships, Yargelis Savigne won the triple jump with a distance of 15.05 metres.

== Medalists ==
Gold
Yargelis Savigne	Cuba
Silver
Marija Šestak	Slovenia
Bronze
Olga Rypakova	Kazakhstan

== Qualification ==
Qualification performance is either 14.30m or top 8 placement.

Pos	Athlete	Country	Mark	Q	Attempts		
Pos	Athlete	Country	Mark	Q	1	2	3
DQ	Hrysopiyí Devetzí	Greece	~~14.63~~	Q, doping	~~14.63~~		
1	Yargelis Savigne	Cuba	14.56	Q	13.93	14.25	14.56
2	Marija Šestak	Slovenia	14.46	Q	13.75	14.46	
3	Yamilé Aldama	Sudan	14.38 SB	Q	14.02	14.07	14.38
4	Olha Saladukha	Ukraine	14.34	Q	14.16	14.34	
5	Olesya Bufalova	Russia	14.26	q	X	14.10	14.26
6	Xie Limei	China	14.25	q	14.02	14.25	12.04
7	Olga Rypakova	Kazakhstan	14.20	q	X	14.20	14.01
8	Teresa Nzola Meso	France	14.17		13.99	14.17	14.10
9	Adelina Gavrilă	Romania	14.11		14.11	14.05	14.11
10	Anna Pyatykh	Russia	13.99		X	13.99	13.68
11	Biljana Topic	Serbia	13.97		13.97	13.78	13.69
12	Patricia Sarrapio	Spain	13.86		X	X	13.86
13	Cristina Bujin	Romania	13.78		13.35	13.78	X
14	Athanasia Perra	Greece	13.61		13.61	X	X
15	Shani Marks	United States	13.33		13.27	X	13.33
16	Kaire Leibak	Estonia	13.32		13.22	13.27	13.32
17	Tânia da Silva	Brazil	13.03		X	13.03	X

== Final ==
Pos	Athlete	Country	Mark	Attempts					
Pos	Athlete	Country	Mark	1	2	3	4	5	6
Gold medal	Yargelis Savigne	Cuba	15.05 AR	14.89	14.44	14.68	14.58	14.60	15.05
DQ	Hrysopiyí Devetzí	Greece	~~15.00 NR~~	~~14.93~~	~~14.83~~	~~X~~	~~15.00~~	~~X~~	~~14.91~~
Silver medal	Marija Šestak	Slovenia	14.68	14.60	14.68	X	14.65	X	X
Bronze medal	Olga Rypakova	Kazakhstan	14.58 AR	X	X	14.18	14.35	14.48	14.58
4	Yamilé Aldama	Sudan	14.47 SB	14.35	12.29	14.47	14.37	14.30	14.20
5	Olha Saladukha	Ukraine	14.32	14.32	14.19	14.04	14.13	12.51	14.22
6	Olesya Bufalova	Russia	14.31	14.24	13.09	14.02	14.24	14.31	14.11
7	Xie Limei	China	14.13	13.84	14.13	12.47	14.06	14.07	13.68
