= Athletics at the 2013 SEA Games – Women's triple jump =

The men's discus throw at the 2013 SEA Games, the athletics was held in Naypyidaw, Myanmar. The track and field events took place at the Wunna Theikdi Stadium on December 17.

== Schedule ==
All times are Myanmar Standard Time (UTC+06:30)

Date	Time	Event
Tuesday, 17 December 2013	14:30	Final

== Records ==
Prior to this competition, the existing world, Asian, and Southeast Asian Games records were as follows.

World Record	Inessa Kravets (UKR)	15.50	Gothenburg, Sweden	10 August 1995
Asian Record	Olga Rypakova (KAZ)	15.25	Split, Croatia	4 September 2010
Games Record	Thitima Muangjan (THA)	14.08	Vientiane, Laos	14 December 2009

== Results ==
Legend

- X — Failure
- NM — No Mark

Rank	Athlete	Attempts						Result	Notes
Rank	Athlete	1	2	3	4	5	6	Result	Notes
1st place, gold medalist(s)	Maria Londa (INA)	?	?	?	?	?	?	14.17	GR, NR
2nd place, silver medalist(s)	Thitima Muangjan (THA)	?	?	?	?	?	?	14.16	NR
3rd place, bronze medalist(s)	Tran Hue Hoa (VIE)	?	?	?	?	?	?	14.12	NR
4	Vu Thi Men (VIE)	?	?	?	?	?	?	13.60	
5	Jamjuree Kwansong (THA)	?	?	?	?	?	?	12.72	
6	Laenly Phoutthavong (LAO)	?	?	?	?	?	?	12.18	NR
7	Myint Myint Wai (MYA)	?	?	?	?	?	?	12.11	
8	Lwin Thandar Oo (MYA)	?	?	?	?	?	?	11.43	
—	Noor Amira Mohamad Nafiah (MAS)	X	X	X				NM	
