= 2015 Asian Athletics Championships – Women's triple jump =

The women's triple jump event at the 2015 Asian Athletics Championships was held on June 7.

== Results ==
Rank	Name	Nationality	#1	#2	#3	#4	#5	#6	Result	Notes
1st place, gold medalist(s)	Wang Wupin	China	13.27	13.38	13.23	13.76	x	13.44	13.76	
2nd place, silver medalist(s)	Li Yanmei	China	13.57	x	x	13.45	x	13.45	13.57	
3rd place, bronze medalist(s)	Wang Rong	China	13.44	13.25	13.17	13.43	13.34	13.40	13.44	
4	Aleksandra Kotlyarova	Uzbekistan	x	13.00	13.40	x	13.16	x	13.40	
5	Irina Ektova	Kazakhstan	x	12.08	x	13.20	x	13.27	13.27	
6	Bae Chan-mi	South Korea	x	12.37	x	12.76	x	x	12.76	
7	Vidusha Lakshani	Sri Lanka	x	12.69	12.12	x	x	x	12.69	
8	Nadia Mohd Zuki	Malaysia	12.59	x	x	x	x	x	12.59	
	Anastasiya Juravleva	Uzbekistan							DNS	
