= Athletics at the 2012 Summer Olympics – Women's triple jump =

Women's triple jump at the Games of the XXX Olympiad
- Venue: Olympic Stadium
- Date: 3–5 August
- Competitors: 35 from 24 nations
- Winning distance: 14.98

Medalists
1st place, gold medalist(s)		Olga Rypakova	Kazakhstan
2nd place, silver medalist(s)		Caterine Ibargüen	Colombia
3rd place, bronze medalist(s)		Olha Saladukha	Ukraine

Official video

The Women's triple jump competition at the 2012 Summer Olympics in London, United Kingdom. The event was held at the Olympic Stadium on 3–5 August.

Greece's Paraskevi Papachristou was sent home by the national delegation for comments she made on Twitter.

Four athletes achieved the automatic qualifier, Kimberly Williams and home team favorite Yamilé Aldama, just two weeks short of her 40th birthday, hit the mark in their first attempt. Olga Rypakova's third round jump of 14.79 led the way, while it took 14.16 to make the final.

The only returning medalist from 2008 was Tatyana Lebedeva, but at 36, she was jumping more than 1.20 m less than four years ago. Fourth place from that competition Olga Rypakova took the lead in the first round. Hanna Knyazyeva edged ahead in the second round. In the third round Caterine Ibargüen took the lead briefly, but then Rypakova hit the winner at 14.98 on the next jump. In the final round, Olha Saladukha nailed her best jump to move into silver medal position. Two jumps later, Ibargüen bested that by a mere centimeter to push Saladukha back to bronze. Rypakova's winning jump was 13 cm less than her 4th place jump, even less than the 6th place jump in 2008.

== Competition format ==
The competition consisted of two rounds, qualification and final. In qualification, each athlete jumped three times (stopping early if they made the qualifying distance). At least the top twelve athletes moved on to the final; if more than twelve reached the qualifying distance, all who did so advanced. Distances were reset for the final round. Finalists jumped three times, after which the eight best jumped three more times (with the best distance of the six jumps counted).

== Schedule ==
All times are British Summer Time (UTC+1)

Date	Time	Round
Friday, 3 August 2012	10:25	Qualifications
Sunday, 5 August 2012	19:35	Finals

== Records ==
Prior to the competition, the existing World and Olympic records were as follows.

World record	Inessa Kravets (UKR)	15.50 m	Gothenburg, Sweden	10 August 1995
Olympic record	Françoise Mbango Etone (CMR)	15.39 m	Beijing, China	17 August 2008
2012 World leading	Olha Saladukha (UKR)	14.99 m	Helsinki, Finland	29 June 2012

== Results ==
=== Qualifying round ===
Qual. rule: qualification standard 14.40m (Q) or at least best 12 qualified (q)

Rank	Group	Name	Nationality	#1	#2	#3	Result	Notes
1	B	Olga Rypakova	Kazakhstan	x	13.99	14.79	14.79	Q
2	A	Kimberly Williams	Jamaica	14.53	—	—	14.53	Q, PB
3	A	Yamilé Aldama	Great Britain	14.45	—	—	14.45	Q
4	B	Caterine Ibargüen	Colombia	14.24	14.42	—	14.42	Q
5	A	Olha Saladukha	Ukraine	14.26	14.35	x	14.35	q
6	B	Hanna Knyazyeva	Ukraine	14.33	x	x	14.33	q
7	B	Trecia-Kaye Smith	Jamaica	x	14.31	x	14.31	q, SB
8	A	Tatyana Lebedeva	Russia	14.17	14.30	—	14.30	q
9	B	Yargelis Savigne	Cuba	14.22	14.28	14.02	14.28	q
10	A	Dana Velďáková	Slovakia	x	14.22	13.84	14.22	q
DSQ	A	Viktoriya Valyukevich	Russia	14.09	14.19	13.86	14.19	q
12	A	Marija Šestak	Slovenia	x	14.16	14.12	14.16	q
13	B	Patrícia Mamona	Portugal	14.11	13.97	13.96	14.11	
14	B	Ayanna Alexander	Trinidad and Tobago	13.98	13.92	14.09	14.09	
15	A	Hanna Demydova	Ukraine	13.97	13.60	x	13.97	
15	B	Dailenys Alcántara	Cuba	13.97	x	x	13.97	
17	B	Veronika Mosina	Russia	13.72	13.56	13.96	13.96	
18	B	Simona La Mantia	Italy	13.77	13.92	13.73	13.92	
19	A	Josleidy Ribalta	Cuba	13.71	13.12	13.88	13.88	
20	B	Keila Costa	Brazil	x	13.69	13.84	13.84	
21	B	Svetlana Bolshakova	Belgium	13.84	13.42	13.45	13.84	
22	B	Mayookha Johny	India	13.77	13.68	13.62	13.77	
23	B	Xie Limei	China	13.63	x	13.69	13.69	
24	A	Niki Panetta	Greece	x	13.66	13.63	13.66	
25	B	Biljana Topić	Serbia	x	x	13.66	13.66	
26	B	Patricia Sarrapio	Spain	x	13.64	x	13.64	
27	A	Amanda Smock	United States	x	13.43	13.61	13.61	
28	A	Aleksandra Kotlyarova	Uzbekistan	13.33	x	13.55	13.55	
29	B	Anastasiya Juravleva	Uzbekistan	13.54	x	x	13.54	
30	A	Li Yanmei	China	13.43	12.78	13.15	13.43	
31	A	Irina Litvinenko Ektova	Kazakhstan	13.39	x	x	13.39	
32	A	Andriana Banova	Bulgaria	x	12.88	13.33	13.33	
33	B	Athanasia Perra	Greece	x	x	11.93	11.93	
–	A	Cristina Bujin	Romania	x	x	x	NM	
–	A	Kseniya Dziatsuk	Belarus	x	x	x	NM	

=== Final ===
Rank	Name	Nationality	#1	#2	#3	#4	#5	#6	Result	Notes
1st place, gold medalist(s)	Olga Rypakova	Kazakhstan	14.54	x	14.98	x	14.89	14.40	14.98	
2nd place, silver medalist(s)	Caterine Ibargüen	Colombia	14.45	13.99	14.67	14.37	14.35	14.80	14.80	
3rd place, bronze medalist(s)	Olha Saladukha	Ukraine	13.92	14.48	x	14.53	14.51	14.79	14.79	
4	Hanna Knyazyeva	Ukraine	X	14.56	14.16	14.14	14.16	x	14.56	
5	Yamilé Aldama	Great Britain	14.10	14.09	14.39	14.32	14.43	14.48	14.48	
6	Kimberly Williams	Jamaica	14.35	x	14.48	14.19	x	14.20	14.48	
7	Trecia-Kaye Smith	Jamaica	x	x	14.35	14.34	13.74	x	14.35	
8	Yargelis Savigne	Cuba	14.12	12.13	13.91	Did not advance			14.12	
9	Tatyana Lebedeva	Russia	14.11	14.03	14.01	Did not advance			14.11	
10	Marija Šestak	Slovenia	13.84	13.98	13.98	Did not advance			13.98	
11	Dana Velďáková	Slovakia	x	x	11.92	Did not advance			11.92	
DSQ	Viktoriya Valyukevich	Russia	14.24	13.75	14.18	13.75	14.15	x	14.24	DSQ for doping
