= Yargelis Savigne =

Cuban athlete (born 1984)

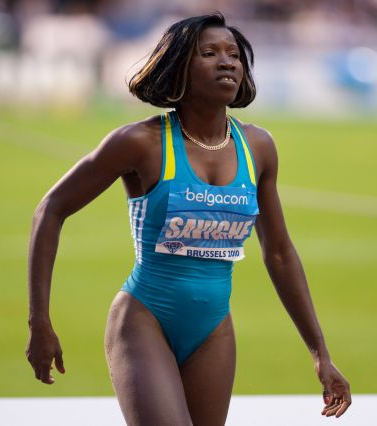
- Savigne during the 2010 Memorial Van Damme

Personal information
- Born: 13 November 1984 (age 42) Niceto Pérez, Guantánamo, Cuba
- Height: 1.65 m (5 ft 5 in)
- Weight: 63 kg (139 lb)

Sport
- Sport: Athletics
- Events: Triple Jump, Long Jump
Medal record
Women's athletics
Representing Cuba
Olympic Games
Bronze medal – third place	2008 Beijing	Triple jump
World Championships
Gold medal – first place	2007 Osaka	Triple jump
Gold medal – first place	2009 Berlin	Triple jump
Silver medal – second place	2005 Helsinki	Triple jump
Bronze medal – third place	2005 Helsinki	long jump
World indoor championships
Gold medal – first place	2008 Valencia	Triple jump
Silver medal – second place	2010 Doha	Triple jump
Pan American Games
Gold medal – first place	2007 Rio de Janeiro	Triple jump
Silver medal – second place	2011 Guadalajara	Triple jump
Bronze medal – third place	2003 Santo Domingo	Long jump
Bronze medal – third place	2007 Rio de Janeiro	Long jump
Continental Cup
Silver medal – second place	2010 Split	Long jump
Bronze medal – third place	2010 Split	Triple jump
CAC Junior Championships (U20)
Gold medal – first place	2002 Bridgetown	Long jump
- Updated on 13 June 2013

Yargelis Savigne Herrera (born 13 November 1984) is a Cuban athlete competing in the triple jump and long jump.

Her international breakthrough came in 2005, when she, competing in both the triple and long jump events at the 2005 World Championships, won a silver medal and finished fourth, respectively. She continued her form throughout the year to place third at the World Athletics Final with 14.81.

She won a gold medal at the 2007 World Championships in the triple jump, with a distance of 15.28 m. At the 2008 World Indoor Championships, Savigne lay in second before her final attempt, with an area record of 14.95 m, behind Hrysopiyi Devetzi's Greek record of 15.00 m. However, Savigne jumped 15.05 m on her final attempt to take the gold medal.

Savigne won her second major outdoor gold medal at the 2009 World Championships. Her jump of 14.95 m was enough to win in a modest competition which saw compatriot Mabel Gay take silver with 14.61 m. The following year she won the silver medal at the 2010 IAAF World Indoor Championships, finishing behind Olga Rypakova who made the third longest indoor jump ever for the gold. In the outdoor season, she improved her long jump best to 6.91 m in Reims at a meeting on the Alma Athlé Tour, despite having trouble with her right ankle. She remained focused on her triple jump speciality, however, aiming to return to her 2007 peak form.

== Personal bests ==
Event	Best (m)	Venue	Date	Notes
Long jump (outdoor)	6.91	Reims, France	30 June 2010	
Long jump (indoor)	6.79	Stuttgart, Germany	3 February 2007	
Triple jump (outdoor)	15.28	Osaka, Japan	31 August 2007	12th of all time
Triple jump (indoor)	15.05	Valencia, Spain	8 March 2008	5th of all time

- All information taken from IAAF profile.

== Achievements ==
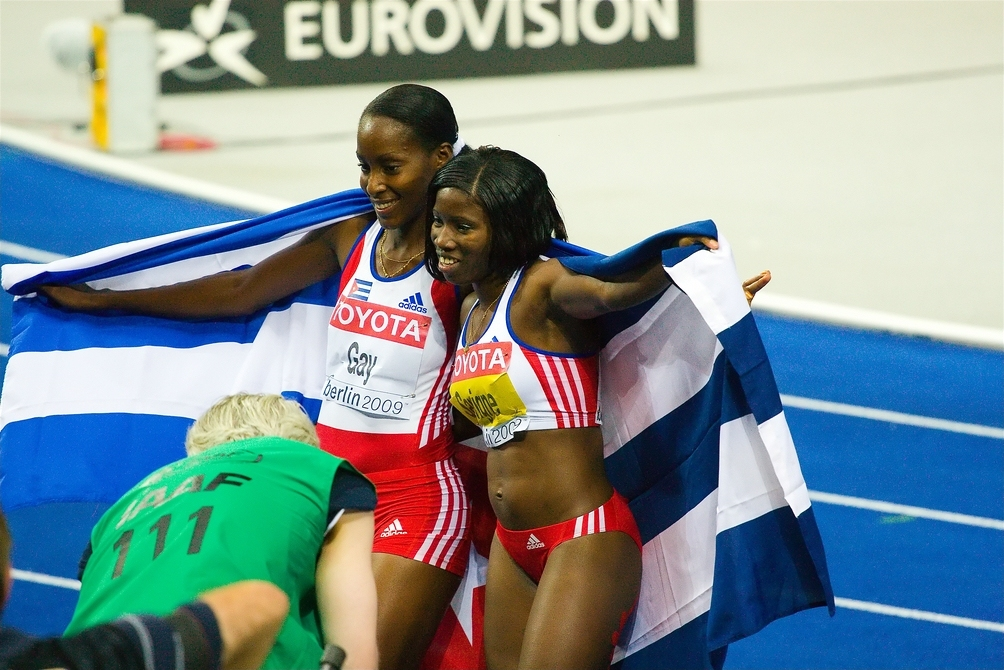
Savigne (right) and Mabel Gay at the 2009 World Championships

Year	Competition	Venue	Position	Event	Notes
Representing Cuba
2002	CAC Junior Championships (U20)	Bridgetown, Barbados	1st	Long jump	6.25 m (wind: -1.3 m/s)
2002	World Junior Championships	Kingston, Jamaica	14th (q)	Long jump	6.00 m (wind: +1.0 m/s)
2003	Pan American Games	Santo Domingo, Dominican Republic	3rd	Long jump	6.40 m (wind: -0.3 m/s)
2005	CAC Championships	Nassau, Bahamas	1st	Long jump	6.88 m (wind: +4.6 m/s) w
2005	World Championships	Helsinki, Finland	3rd	Long jump	6.69 m (wind: +0.1 m/s)
2005	World Championships	Helsinki, Finland	2nd	Triple jump	14.82 m (wind: +0.7 m/s) PB
2005	World Athletics Final	Monte Carlo, Monaco	3rd	Triple jump	14.81 m (wind: +1.5 m/s)
2006	World Indoor Championships	Moscow, Russia	6th	Long jump	6.51 m
2006	World Indoor Championships	Moscow, Russia	5th	Triple jump	14.72 m PB
2007	ALBA Games	Caracas, Venezuela	1st	Long jump	6.60 m (wind: +0.0 m/s)
2007	ALBA Games	Caracas, Venezuela	1st	Triple jump	14.99 m (wind: +0.7 m/s) NR
2007	World Championships	Osaka, Japan	1st	Triple jump	15.28 m (wind: +0.9 m/s) PB
2007	Pan American Games	Rio de Janeiro, Brazil	3rd	Long jump	6.66 m (wind: +0.0 m/s)
2007	Pan American Games	Rio de Janeiro, Brazil	1st	Triple jump	14.80 m (wind: +0.5 m/s) GR
2007	World Athletics Final	Stuttgart, Germany	1st	Triple jump	14.78 m (wind: +0.4 m/s)
2008	World Indoor Championships	Valencia, Spain	1st	Triple jump	15.05 m (wind: +. m/s) PB
2008	Olympic Games	Beijing, China	17th (q)	Long jump	6.49 m (wind: +.1 m/s)
2008	Olympic Games	Beijing, China	3rd	Triple jump	15.05 m (wind: +0.1 m/s)
2009	ALBA Games	Havana, Cuba	1st	Triple jump	14.70 m (wind: -0.8 m/s)
2009	CAC Championships	Havana, Cuba	1st	Triple jump	14.97 (wind: -0.5 m/s) CR
2009	World Championships	Berlin, Germany	1st	Triple jump	14.95 m (wind: +1.3 m/s)
2010	World Indoor Championships	Doha, Qatar	2nd	Triple jump	14.86 m
2010	Ibero-American Championships	San Fernando, Spain	1st	Triple jump	14.62 m (wind: +0.8 m/s)
2011	World Championships	Daegu, South Korea	6th	Triple jump	14.43 m (wind: +0.0 m/s)
2011	Pan American Games	Guadalajara, Mexico	2nd	Triple jump	14.36 m (wind: -0.5 m/s)
2012	World Indoor Championships	Istanbul, Turkey	4th	Triple jump	14.28 m
2012	Olympic Games	London, United Kingdom	9th	Triple jump	14.12 m (wind: -0.2 m/s)
