= 2007 World Championships in Athletics – Women's triple jump =

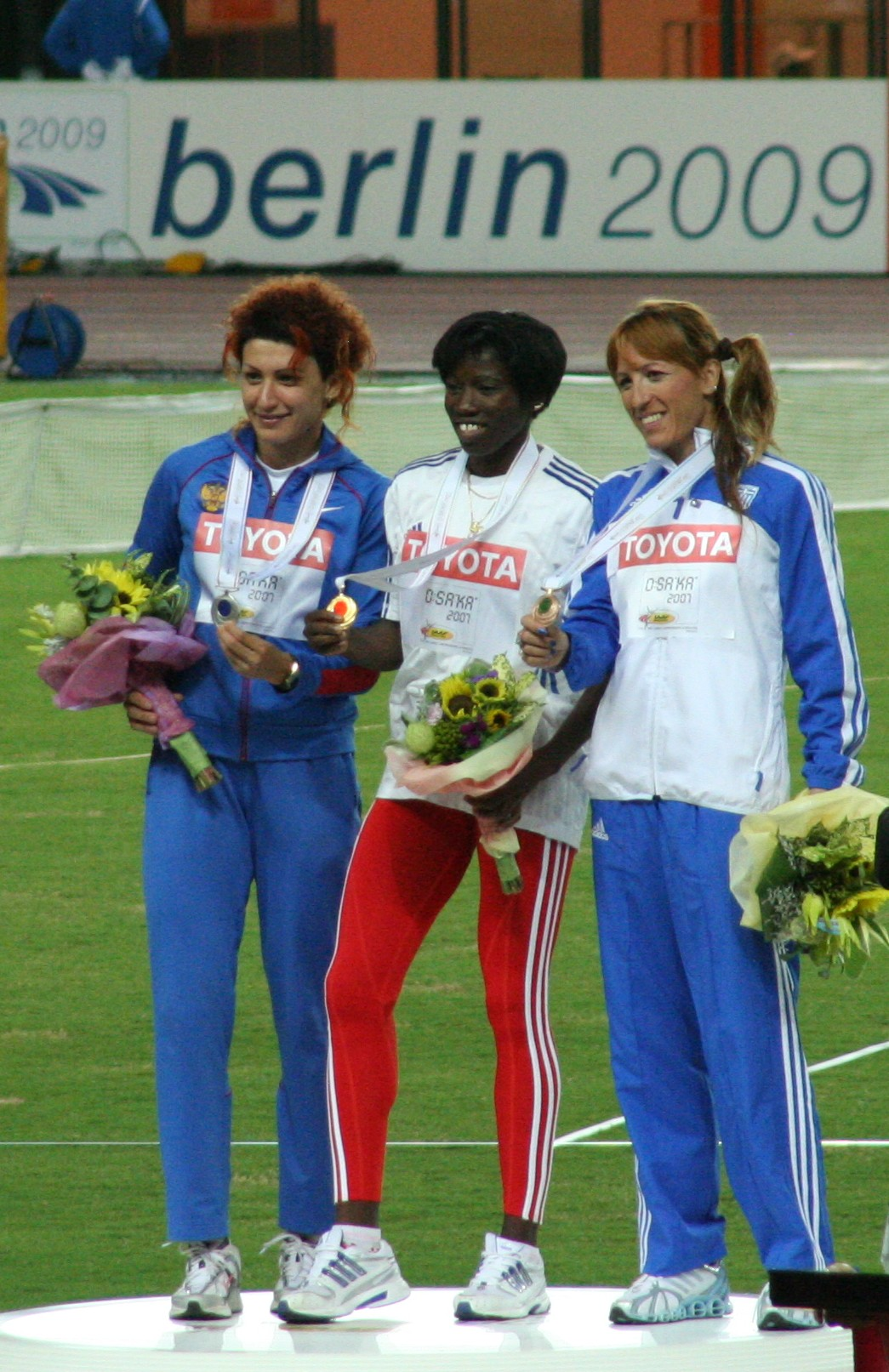
The original medalists.

The women's triple jump event at the 2007 World Championships in Athletics took place on August 29, 2007 (qualification) and August 31, 2007 (final) at the Nagai Stadium in Osaka, Japan. The athletes originally in third and fourth place (Hrysopiyi Devetzi of Greece and Anna Pyatykh of Russia) were retrospectively disqualified due to doping. Slovenia's Marija Šestak, originally fifth, was upgraded to the bronze medal as a result.

== Medallists ==
Gold	Yargelis Savigne; Cuba (CUB)
Silver	Tatyana Lebedeva; Russia (RUS)
Bronze	Marija Šestak; Slovenia (SLO)

== Records ==
World record and Championship record	15.50	Inessa Kravets	Ukraine	Gothenburg, Sweden	7 August 1995

== Results ==
=== Final ===
Place	Athlete	Nation	Mark	Notes
1	Yargelis Savigne	Cuba	15.28	WL PB
2	Tatyana Lebedeva	Russia	15.07	
3	Marija Šestak	Slovenia	14.72	
4	Magdelín Martínez	Italy	14.71	SB
5	Olha Saladukha	Ukraine	14.60	
6	Xie Limei	China	14.50	
7	Keila Costa	Brazil	14.40	
8	Olesya Bufalova	Russia	14.39	
9	Olga Rypakova	Kazakhstan	14.32	
10	Dana Veldáková	Slovakia	14.09	
–	Hrysopiyi Devetzi	Greece	~~15.04~~	DQ
–	Anna Pyatykh	Russia	~~14.88~~	DQ

=== Qualification ===
==== Group A ====
Place	Athlete	Nation	Mark	Notes
1	Yargelis Savigne	Cuba	14.67	Q
2	Marija Šestak	Slovenia	14.58	Q
3	Anna Pyatykh	Russia	14.51	Q
4	Olga Rypakova	Kazakhstan	14.41	Q
5	Keila Costa	Brazil	14.36	q
6	Dana Veldáková	Slovakia	14.20	q
7	Carlota Castrejana	Spain	14.16	
8	Athanasia Perra	Greece	14.15	
9	Adelina Gavrilă	Romania	14.02	
10	Teresa Nzola Meso Ba	France	13.94	
11	Tânia da Silva	Brazil	13.81	
12	Li Qian	China	13.63	
13	Trecia Smith	Jamaica	13.47	
14	Anastasiya Juravleva	Uzbekistan	13.31	
15	Maria Natalia Londa	Indonesia	12.94	
16	Fumiyo Yoshida	Japan	12.62	

==== Group B ====
Place	Athlete	Nation	Mark	Notes
1	Hrysopiyi Devetzi	Greece	15.09	Q SB
2	Magdelín Martínez	Italy	14.62	Q SB
3	Tatyana Lebedeva	Russia	14.57	Q
4	Olha Saladukha	Ukraine	14.43	Q
5	Olesya Bufalova	Russia	14.40	Q
6	Xie Limei	China	14.34	q
7	Yarianna Martínez	Cuba	14.01	
8	Shani Marks	United States	13.90	
9	Malgorzata Trybanska	Poland	13.90	
10	Patricia Sarrapio	Spain	13.55	
11	Yelena Parfenova	Kazakhstan	13.52	
12	Yamilé Aldama	Sudan	13.46	
13	Chinonye Ohadugha	Nigeria	13.32	
—	Mariya Dimitrova	Bulgaria	NM	
—	Maurren Higa Maggi	Brazil	DNS	
