= Athletics at the 2010 Asian Games – Women's triple jump =

Women's triple jump at the 2010 Asian Games
- Venue: Aoti Main Stadium
- Date: 25 November 2010
- Competitors: 10 from 7 nations

Medalists
gold medal	Olga Rypakova	Kazakhstan
silver medal	Xie Limei	China
bronze medal	Thitima Muangjan	Thailand

The women's triple jump event at the 2010 Asian Games was held at the Aoti Main Stadium, Guangzhou, China on 25 November, during the 2010 Asian Games.

== Schedule ==
All times are China Standard Time (UTC+08:00)

Date	Time	Event
Thursday, 25 November 2010	17:10	Final

== Records ==
Prior to this competition, the existing world, Asian and Games records were as follows.

World Record	Inessa Kravets (UKR)	15.50	Gothenburg, Sweden	10 August 1995
Asian Record	Olga Rypakova (KAZ)	15.25	Split, Croatia	4 September 2010
Games Record	Xie Limei (CHN)	14.37	Doha, Qatar	11 December 2006

== Results ==
Legend

- DNS — Did not stat
- NM — No mark

Rank	Athlete	Attempt						Result	Notes
Rank	Athlete	1	2	3	4	5	6	Result	Notes
1st place, gold medalist(s)	Olga Rypakova (KAZ)	X +1.4	14.64 +0.5	14.78 +1.1	14.35 +1.1	—	—	14.78	GR
2nd place, silver medalist(s)	Xie Limei (CHN)	14.18 +1.3	X +1.2	X +0.5	X +1.8	13.93 +0.8	X +1.2	14.18	
3rd place, bronze medalist(s)	Thitima Muangjan (THA)	X +0.7	X +0.8	13.16 +1.3	13.85 +1.3	X +1.6	13.57 +0.4	13.85	
4	Aleksandra Kotlyarova (UZB)	13.68 +0.9	X +1.0	X +1.7	X +0.2	13.63 +0.6	13.73 +0.9	13.73	
5	Chen Yufei (CHN)	13.01 +0.6	X +0.6	13.39 +1.2	13.31 +0.4	X +0.2	13.35 +0.6	13.39	
6	Anastasiya Juravleva (UZB)	X +0.9	X +1.3	12.85 −0.1	13.38 +0.7	X +0.6	X +0.5	13.38	
7	Jung Hye-kyung (KOR)	X +1.4	13.25 +0.6	X +0.9	13.18 +0.9	12.66 +1.1	13.06 +0.9	13.25	
8	Sirada Seechaichana (THA)	12.56 +0.7	X +0.9	12.79 +1.0	X +1.9	12.87 +0.5	12.73 +0.4	12.87	
—	Keshari Chaudhari (NEP)	X +1.6	X +1.1	X +1.0				NM	
—	M. A. Prajusha (IND)							DNS	
