= Teresa Nzola Meso Ba =

Angolan-French triple jumper (born 1983)

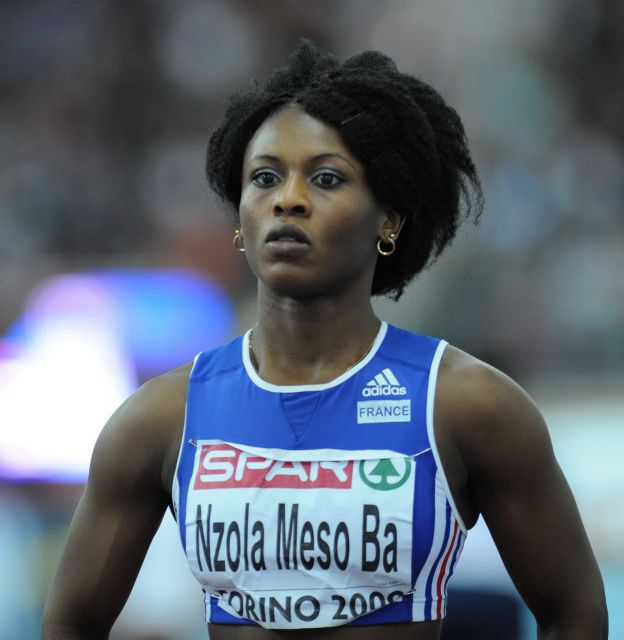
Teresa Nzola Meso Ba at the 2009 European Indoor Championships in Turin.

Teresa Nzola Meso Ba (born 30 November 1983, in Luanda) is an Angolan-French triple jumper.

== Biography ==
She formerly represented Angola, but switched to France in 2003. Before this she set an Angolan triple jump record of 13.49 metres, which still stands.

Nzola Meso Ba finished ninth at the 2006 European Championships. At the 2007 European Indoor Championships, she finished third in a new French indoor record and personal best jump of 14.49 metres. Her personal best jump before the event was 14.07 metres, achieved in 2006.

She then competed at the 2007 World Championships, the 2008 World Indoor Championships and the 2008 Olympic Games without reaching the final. She improved her personal best to 14.69 metres in June 2007 in Munich.

== Competition record ==
Year	Competition	Venue	Position	Event	Notes
Representing France
2005	European Indoor Championships	Madrid, Spain	16th (q)	Triple jump	13.31 m
2005	European U23 Championships	Erfurt, Germany	8th	Triple jump	13.47 m
2006	European Championships	Gothenburg, Sweden	9th	Triple jump	13.76 m
2007	European Indoor Championships	Birmingham, United Kingdom	3rd	Triple jump	14.49 m
2007	World Championships	Osaka, Japan	17th (q)	Triple jump	13.94 m
2008	World Indoor Championships	Valencia, Spain	9th (q)	Triple jump	14.17 m
2008	Olympic Games	Beijing, China	14th (q)	Triple jump	14.11 m
2009	European Indoor Championships	Turin, Italy	5th	Triple jump	14.31 m
2009	Mediterranean Games	Pescara, Italy	2nd	Triple jump	14.16 m
2009	World Championships	Berlin, Germany	11th	Triple jump	13.79 m
2013	Mediterranean Games	Mersin, Turkey	7th	Triple jump	13.36 m
