= Trecia-Kaye Smith =

Jamaican athletics competitor

Personal information
- Born: 5 November 1975 (age 50) Westmoreland, Jamaica
- Education: University of Pittsburgh
- Height: 1.85 m (6 ft 1 in)
- Weight: 76 kg (168 lb)

Sport
- Sport: Running
- Event: Triple jump
Medal record
Representing Jamaica
Women's Athletics
World Championships
Gold medal – first place	2005 Helsinki	Triple jump
Commonwealth Games
Gold medal – first place	2006 Melbourne	Triple jump
Gold medal – first place	2010 Delhi	Triple jump
Bronze medal – third place	2002 Manchester	Triple jump
CAC Junior Championships (U20)
Gold medal – first place	1994 Port of Spain	Long jump
Silver medal – second place	1994 Port of Spain	Heptathlon
CARIFTA Games Junior (U20)
Gold medal – first place	1994 Bridgetown	Long jump
CARIFTA Games Youth (U17)
Bronze medal – third place	1990 Kingston	Long jump

Trecia-Kaye Smith (born 5 November 1975 in Westmoreland, Jamaica) is a retired Jamaican athlete who competed mainly in the triple jump.

== Career ==
In college, she competed for the University of Pittsburgh from 1996 to 1999 and was a seven-time NCAA national champion (two outdoor and three indoor long jump titles and one outdoor and one indoor triple jump title), 15-time All-American, a 14-time Big East Conference champion, and a 15-time Eastern College Athletic Conference champion. Trecia was named to the NCAA Division I Silver Anniversary Indoor Team and an "NCAA Division I Most Outstanding Student-Athlete".

Her personal best is 15.16 metres, and she almost equaled that result at the 2005 World Championships where she won the gold medal with 15.11 metres.

Smith won triple jump at the 2009 Jamaican Championship with 14.43 m, qualifying for her fifth World Championships in Athletics. She retained her Commonwealth triple jump title at the 2010 Commonwealth Games, and she was given the David Dixon Award for her performance. The decision was a surprise in many quarters as she had only one legal jump at the competition, a modest mark of 14.19 m which she herself acknowledged was "a terrible jump".

Smith was inducted into the USTFCCCA Collegiate Athlete Hall of Fame in 2024.

== Achievements ==
Year	Competition	Venue	Position	Event	Notes
Representing Jamaica
1990	CARIFTA Games (U-17)	Kingston, Jamaica	3rd	Long jump	5.25 m
1992	CARIFTA Games (U-20)	Nassau, Bahamas	4th	High jump	1.60 m
1994	CARIFTA Games (U-20)	Bridgetown, Barbados	4th	400 m hurdles	72.27
1994	CARIFTA Games (U-20)	Bridgetown, Barbados	1st	Long jump	6.06 m
1994	CARIFTA Games (U-20)	Bridgetown, Barbados	4th	Javelin	31.22 m
1994	Central American and Caribbean Junior Championships (U-20)	Port of Spain, Trinidad and Tobago	1st	Long jump	6.40 m
1994	Central American and Caribbean Junior Championships (U-20)	Port of Spain, Trinidad and Tobago	2nd	Heptathlon	4899 pts
1994	World Junior Championships	Lisbon, Portugal	11th	Long jump	6.12 m w (wind: +3.1 m/s)
1997	World Championships	Athens, Greece	31st (q)	Triple jump	13.34 m (-0.3 m/s)
2001	Central American and Caribbean Championships	Guatemala City, Guatemala	2nd	Long jump	6.68 m A
2001	Central American and Caribbean Championships	Guatemala City, Guatemala	1st	Long jump	14.12 m A
2001	World Championships	Edmonton, Canada	8th	Triple jump	13.92 m (-1.3 m/s)
2002	Commonwealth Games	Manchester, United Kingdom	3rd	Triple jump	14.32 m PB
2002	World Cup	Madrid, Spain	4th	Triple jump	13.82 m (0.4 m/s)
2004	World Indoor Championships	Budapest, Hungary	4th	Triple jump	14.71 m NR
2004	Olympic Games	Athens, Greece	4th	Triple jump	15.02 m (0.5 m/s)
2004	World Athletics Final	Monte Carlo, Monaco	7th	Triple jump	14.53 m (-0.5 m/s)
2005	World Championships	Helsinki, Finland	1st	Triple jump	15.11 m (0.8 m/s) WL
2005	World Athletics Final	Monte Carlo, Monaco	4th	Triple jump	14.69 m (0.4 m/s)
2006	World Indoor Championships	Moscow, Russia	4th	Triple jump	14.84 m NR
2006	Commonwealth Games	Melbourne, Australia	1st	Triple jump	14.39 m
2006	World Cup	Athens, Greece	4th	Triple jump	14.64 m
2007	World Championships	Osaka, Japan	24th (q)	Triple jump	13.47 m (-0.3 m/s)
2008	Olympic Games	Beijing, China	11th	Triple jump	14.12 m (0.5 m/s)
2009	World Championships	Berlin, Germany	5th	Triple jump	14.48 m (-0.2 m/s)
2010	Commonwealth Games	New Delhi, India	1st	Triple jump	14.19 m SB
2012	Olympic Games	London, United Kingdom	7th	Triple jump	14.35 m
