= 2005 World Championships in Athletics – Women's triple jump =

The Women's Triple Jump event at the 2005 World Championships in Athletics was held at the Helsinki Olympic Stadium on August 6 and August 7.

== Medalists ==
Gold	Trecia Smith; Jamaica (JAM)
Silver	Yargelis Savigne; Cuba (CUB)
Bronze	Anna Pyatykh; Russia (RUS)

== Qualification ==
=== Heat 1 ===
1. Yargelis Savigne, Cuba 14.47m Q
2. Magdelín Martínez, Italy 14.46m Q
3. Anna Pyatykh, Russia 14.46m Q
4. Viktoriya Gurova, Russia 14.38m Q
5. Yamilé Aldama, Sudan 14.36m Q
6. Baya Rahouli, Algeria 14.17m q
7. Natallia Safronava, Belarus 14.09m
8. Anastasiya Zhuravleva, Uzbekistan 13.97m
9. Dana Veldáková, Slovakia 13.84m
10. Natalia Kilpeläinen, Finland 13.66m
11. Tetyana Dyachenko, Ukraine 13.32m
- Athanasia Perra, Greece NM
- Yelena Parfenova, Kazakhstan NM
- Françoise Mbango Etone, Cameroon DNS

=== Heat 2 ===
1. Hrysopiyi Devetzi, Greece 14.72m Q (SB)
2. Trecia Smith, Jamaica 14.69m Q
3. Qiuyan Huang, China 14.22m q
4. Carlota Castrejana, Spain 14.20m q
5. Tatyana Lebedeva, Russia 14.15m q
6. Kene Ndoye, Senegal 14.11m q
7. Simona la Mantia, Italy 14.00m
8. Snežana Vukmirovic, Slovenia 13.88m
9. Mabel Gay, Cuba 13.83m
10. Mariya Dimitrova, Bulgaria 13.79m
11. Nadezhda Bazhenova, Russia 13.78m
12. Šárka Kašpárková, Czech Republic 13.69m
13. Erica McLain, United States 13.29m

== Final ==
1. Trecia Smith, Jamaica 15.11m (WL)
2. Yargelis Savigne, Cuba 14.82m (PB)
3. Anna Pyatykh, Russia 14.78m
4. Yamilé Aldama, Sudan 14.72m (SB)
5. Hrysopiyi Devetzi, Greece 14.64m
6. Kene Ndoye, Senegal 14.47m (SB)
7. Baya Rahouli, Algeria 14.50m
8. Magdelín Martínez, Italy 14.31m
9. Qiuyan Huang, China 14.21m
10. Viktoriya Gurova, Russia 13.96
11. Carlota Castrejana, Spain 13.86
- Tatyana Lebedeva, Russia DNS
