= Athletics at the 2008 Summer Olympics – Women's triple jump =

Women's triple jump at the Games of the XXIX Olympiad
- Venue: Beijing National Stadium
- Dates: 15 August 2008 (qualification); 17 August 2008 (final)
- Competitors: 36 from 26 nations
- Winning distance: 15.39 OR

Medalists
1st place, gold medalist(s)		Françoise Mbango Etone	Cameroon
2nd place, silver medalist(s)		Olga Rypakova	Kazakhstan
3rd place, bronze medalist(s)		Yargelis Savigne	Cuba

The women's triple jump at the 2008 Olympic Games took place on August 15 and 17 at the Beijing Olympic Stadium.

== Summary ==
The qualifying standards for the 2008 event were 14.20 m (46 ft 7 in) (A standard) and 14.00 m (45 ft 11 in) (B standard).

The automatic qualifier was still 14.45m but unlike four years earlier with 15 auto qualifiers, only eight made it this time. Hrysopiyi Devetzi was the #2 qualifier this time with a less spectacular 14.92m (40 cm less than her personal best in qualifying in 2004). The fifth best jumper in history Yamilé Aldama was unable to find the take off board and fouled out in qualifying.

In the first round of the final, defending champion Françoise Mbango Etone showed she was serious jumping 15.19m to take the lead. Marija Šestak went 15.03m to move into second and the #2 jumper in history Tatyana Lebedeva jumped 15.00m for third place. In the second round Lebedeva jumped 15.17m but Devetzí pulled out a 15.23 and Etone exploded a 15.39 m (50 ft 5 3/4 in), at the time the second best jump in history and became the new Olympic record. After losing a notch in the all-time list, Lebedeva's third round 15.32m, only equalling her personal third best jump, moved her within 7 cm of the lead. Other athletes were able to improve over the 15m mark but the podium was set. Etone's gold was her nation's second individual gold medal in its Olympic history, which followed her first four years earlier.

Almost eight years after the event, blood samples were retested from the 2007 World Championships. Hrysopiyi Devetzi was found to have stanozolol in her sample and her results were annulled. A year after the event, Devetzi was credited with failing another drug test for failing to allow a different test. She retired in 2009. Her 2004 silver medal was not affected by the annulment. In 2017, retests showed Lebedeva also had a positive test for turinabol and was also disqualified from both her medals at the 2008 Olympics. The IOC requested that the IAAF modify the results, and, after CAS dismissed the appeal of Tatyana Lebedeva, the medals were redistributed accordingly. Olga Rypakova was advanced to silver, and Yargelis Savigne was advanced to bronze.

== Records ==
Prior to this competition, the existing world record, Olympic record, and world leading jump were as follows:

World record	Inessa Kravets (UKR)	15.50	Gothenburg, Sweden	10 August 1995
Olympic record	Inessa Kravets (UKR)	15.33	Atlanta, United States	31 July 1996
World Leading	Yargelis Savigne (CUB)	15.20	Rethymno, Greece	14 July 2008

The following new Olympic record was set during this competition.

Date	Event	Name	Nationality	Distance	Notes
17 August	Final	Françoise Mbango Etone	Cameroon	15.39	OR

== Results ==
=== Qualifying round ===
Qualifying Performance 14.45 (Q) or at least 12 best performers (q) advance to the Final.

Rank	Group	Name	Nationality	1	2	3	Mark	Notes
1	A	Yargelis Savigne	Cuba	14.37	14.99	—	14.99	Q
2	B	Hrysopiyi Devetzi	Greece	14.92	—	—	14.92	DSQ
3	A	Viktoriya Gurova	Russia	14.44	14.78	—	14.78	Q
4	A	Olga Rypakova	Kazakhstan	14.64	—	—	14.64	Q, SB
5	B	Tatyana Lebedeva	Russia	14.55	—	—	14.55	DSQ
6	B	Françoise Mbango Etone	Cameroon	14.50	—	—	14.50	Q
7	B	Olha Saladukha	Ukraine	14.46	—	—	14.46	Q
8	A	Anna Pyatykh	Russia	x	14.45	—	14.45	Q
9	A	Marija Šestak	Slovenia	x	14.44	x	14.44	q
10	B	Xie Limei	China	13.38	14.27	14.01	14.27	q
11	B	Kaire Leibak	Estonia	14.19	14.07	x	14.19	q
12	B	Trecia-Kaye Smith	Jamaica	14.18	x	x	14.18	q, SB
13	A	Biljana Topić	Serbia	x	14.11	14.14	14.14	
14	A	Teresa Nzola Meso Ba	France	14.11	14.11	13.98	14.11	
15	A	Mabel Gay	Cuba	x	x	14.09	14.09	
16	A	Carlota Castrejana	Spain	14.02	x	x	14.02	
17	A	Svitlana Mamyeyeva	Ukraine	13.73	13.89	14.01	14.01	
18	A	Magdelín Martínez	Italy	x	14.00	13.77	14.00	
19	B	Adelina Gavrilă	Romania	13.98	13.71	13.55	13.98	
20	A	Carolina Klüft	Sweden	13.6	x	13.97	13.97	
21	B	Yarianna Martínez	Cuba	13.76	13.96	13.83	13.96	
22	B	Baya Rahouli	Algeria	13.80	13.57	13.87	13.87	
23	B	Gisele de Oliveira	Brazil	x	13.81	x	13.81	
24	B	Liliya Kulyk	Ukraine	13.53	13.66	13.39	13.66	
25	A	Gita Dodova	Bulgaria	x	13.47	13.53	13.53	
26	A	Erica McLain	United States	x	13.52	-	13.52	
27	A	Yelena Parfyonova	Kazakhstan	13.46	x	13.38	13.46	
28	B	Shani Marks	United States	13.20	13.44	x	13.44	
29	B	Anastasiya Juravleva	Uzbekistan	13.36	x	x	13.36	
30	A	Chinonye Ohadugha	Nigeria	12.92	12.86	13.29	13.29	
31	A	Kseniya Pryiemka	Belarus	13.08	12.79	x	13.08	
32	A	Irina Litvinenko	Kazakhstan	x	12.92	12.91	12.92	
	B	Yamilé Aldama	Sudan	x	x	x	NM	
	A	Athanasia Perra	Greece	x	x	x	NM	
	B	Martina Šestáková	Czech Republic	x	x	x	NM	
	B	Dana Velďáková	Slovakia	x	x	x	NM	

=== Final ===
Rank	Name	Nationality	1	2	3	4	5	6	Result	Notes
1st place, gold medalist(s)	Françoise Mbango Etone	Cameroon	15.19	15.39	x	14.82	x	14.88	15.39	OR
2nd place, silver medalist(s)	Olga Rypakova	Kazakhstan	x	14.83	14.93	15.03	15.11	x	15.11	AR
3rd place, bronze medalist(s)	Yargelis Savigne	Cuba	x	14.87	14.77	15.05	x	14.91	15.05	
4	Marija Šestak	Slovenia	15.03	14.65	x	14.46	14.47	14.75	15.03	NR
5	Viktoriya Gurova	Russia	14.38	14.04	14.77	x	14.65	x	14.77	
6	Anna Pyatykh	Russia	14.67	14.73	14.57	x	14.67	14.28	14.73	
7	Olha Saladukha	Ukraine	12.78	14.70	11.29	Did not advance			14.70	
8	Kaire Leibak	Estonia	12.19	14.13	x	Did not advance			14.13	
9	Trecia-Kaye Smith	Jamaica	14.12	13.75	x	Did not advance			14.12	
10	Xie Limei	China	14.09	13.94	13.67	Did not advance			14.09	
DSQ	Tatyana Lebedeva	Russia	15.00	15.17	15.32	14.40	x	x	15.32	DSQ for doping
DSQ	Hrysopiyi Devetzi	Greece	14.96	15.23	x	x	x	x	15.23	DSQ for doping
