= 2005 Asian Athletics Championships – Women's triple jump =

The women's triple jump event at the 2005 Asian Athletics Championships was held in Incheon, South Korea on September 1.

== Results ==
Rank	Name	Nationality	#1	#2	#3	#4	#5	#6	Result	Notes
1st place, gold medalist(s)	Xie Limei	China	x	x	13.45	14.24	14.38	13.98	14.38	SB
2nd place, silver medalist(s)	Anastasiya Juravleva	Uzbekistan							14.14	
3rd place, bronze medalist(s)	Huang Qiuyan	China							13.75	
4	Yelena Parfyonova	Kazakhstan							13.45	
5	Kim Soo-Yun	South Korea							13.43	SB
6	Fumiyo Yoshida	Japan							13.20	
7	Thitima Muangjan	Thailand							13.16	
8	Wacharee Ritthiwat	Thailand							13.12w	
9	Jung Hye-Kyung	South Korea							13.06	
10	Olesya Belyayeva	Kazakhstan							12.79	
11	Kang Hye-Soon	North Korea							11.89	PB
	Rakhima Sardi	Kyrgyzstan							NM	
