= 2009 Asian Athletics Championships – Women's triple jump =

The women's triple jump event at the 2009 Asian Athletics Championships was held at the Guangdong Olympic Stadium on November 11.

== Results ==
Rank	Athlete	Nationality	#1	#2	#3	#4	#5	#6	Result	Notes
1st place, gold medalist(s)	Olga Rypakova	Kazakhstan	14.53	14.30w	–	14.31	x	–	14.53	
2nd place, silver medalist(s)	Xu Tingting	China	x	14.11	x	13.90	–	x	14.11	
3rd place, bronze medalist(s)	Irina Litvinenko	Kazakhstan	13.86	13.74w	13.87	13.62	13.99	13.97	13.99	
4	Aleksandra Kotlyarova	Uzbekistan	13.83w	13.94	11.49	13.88	13.54	13.51	13.94	PB
5	Valeriya Kanatova	Uzbekistan	13.15w	13.29	13.12	13.27	13.46	x	13.46	
6	Fadwa Al-Bouza	Syria	x	12.69	12.75	x	x	x	12.75	
7	Fumiyo Yoshida	Japan	x	x	12.71	x	12.66	12.73	12.73	
8	M. A. Prajusha	India	12.58	x	12.35	x	x	x	12.58	
9	Tse Mang Chi	Hong Kong	x	x	12.26				12.26	
10	Reshmi Bose	India	x	12.18	11.94				12.18	
11	Kang Hye Sun	North Korea	11.73	11.76	12.05				12.05	
12	Cheung Lai Yee	Hong Kong	x	11.93	11.86				11.93	
13	Keshari Chaudhari	Nepal	x	x	11.23				11.23	
	Chung Hye-kyong	South Korea	x	x	x				NM	
