= 2010 IAAF World Indoor Championships – Women's triple jump =

The women's triple jump at the 2010 IAAF World Indoor Championships was held at the ASPIRE Dome on 12 and 13 March.

== Medalists ==
Gold	Silver	Bronze
Olga Rypakova; Kazakhstan	Yargelis Savigne; Cuba	Anna Pyatykh; Russia

== Records ==
Standing records prior to the 2010 IAAF World Indoor Championships
World record	Tatyana Lebedeva (RUS)	15.36	Budapest, Hungary	6 March 2004
Championship record	Tatyana Lebedeva (RUS)	15.36	Budapest, Hungary	6 March 2004
World Leading	Yargelis Savigne (CUB)	14.84	Düsseldorf, Germany	3 February 2010
African record	Yamilé Aldama (SUD)	14.90	Budapest, Hungary	6 March 2004
Asian record	Olga Rypakova (KAZ)	14.58	Valencia, Spain	8 March 2008
European record	Tatyana Lebedeva (RUS)	15.36	Budapest, Hungary	6 March 2004
North and Central American and Caribbean record	Yargelis Savigne (CUB)	15.05	Valencia, Spain	8 March 2008
Oceanian Record	Nicole Mladenis (AUS)	13.31	Budapest, Hungary	5 March 2004
South American record	Keila Costa (BRA)	14.11	Moscow, Russia	10 March 2006

== Qualification standards ==
Indoor
14.05m

== Schedule ==
Date	Time	Round
March 12, 2010	9:00	Qualification
March 13, 2010	16:00	Final

== Results ==
=== Qualification ===
Qualification: Qualifying Performance 14.20 (Q) or at least 8 best performers (q) advance to the final.

Rank	Athlete	Nationality	#1	#2	#3	Result	Notes
1	Yargelis Savigne	Cuba	14.59			14.59	Q
2	Olga Rypakova	Kazakhstan	14.57			14.57	Q, SB
3	Mabel Gay	Cuba	x	14.27		14.27	Q
4	Dana Velďáková	Slovakia	14.25			14.25	Q
5	Anastasiya Taranova-Potapova	Russia	13.60	13.82	14.08	14.08	q
6	Anna Pyatykh	Russia	14.04	14.04	14.01	14.04	q
7	Svetlana Bolshakova	Belgium	13.41	13.95	x	13.95	q
8	Xie Limei	China	x	13.89	13.45	13.89	q, SB
9	Snežana Rodic	Slovenia	13.74	13.83	13.84	13.84	
10	Gisele de Oliveira	Brazil	13.73	13.78	13.81	13.81	SB
DQ	Athanasia Perra	Greece	~~13.23~~	~~13.62~~	~~13.71~~	~~13.71~~	Doping
11	Petia Dacheva	Bulgaria	x	x	13.65	13.65	
12	Erica McLain	United States	13.03	13.47	13.54	13.54	
13	Aleksandra Kotlyarova	Uzbekistan	13.35	13.04	13.45	13.45	
14	Adelina Gavrilă	Romania	13.03	13.45	x	13.45	
15	Verónica Davis	Venezuela	x	13.07	13.38	13.38	
16	Liliya Kulyk	Ukraine	13.20	13.19	13.30	13.30	
17	Thitima Muangjan	Thailand	x	x	13.19	13.19	
18	Yamilé Aldama	Sudan	12.41	12.39	x	12.41	SB

=== Final ===
Rank	Athlete	Nationality	#1	#2	#3	#4	#5	#6	Result	Notes
1st place, gold medalist(s)	Olga Rypakova	Kazakhstan	x	14.78	14.17	x	14.93	15.14	15.14	AR, WL
2nd place, silver medalist(s)	Yargelis Savigne	Cuba	14.71	14.70	x	14.45	14.86	14.63	14.86	SB
3rd place, bronze medalist(s)	Anna Pyatykh	Russia	14.25	14.49	14.64	14.43	14.60	14.54	14.64	SB
4	Anastasiya Taranova-Potapova	Russia	14.15	14.10	14.03	14.40	13.87	14.38	14.40	
5	Mabel Gay	Cuba	14.19	x	14.18	14.11	13.90	14.30	14.30	SB
6	Dana Velďáková	Slovakia	14.18	x	13.83	x	13.97	14.13	14.18	
7	Xie Limei	China	13.58	13.99	x	13.82	13.98	14.03	14.03	SB
8	Svetlana Bolshakova	Belgium	x	x	14.01	13.94	13.93	14.02	14.02	
