= Sayuri Takeda =

Japanese triple jumper

Personal information
- Nationality: Japanese
- Born: 29 August 1989 (age 37) Hakodate, Japan
- Education: Hokkaido Eniwa Kita High School

Sport
- Country: Japan
- Sport: Track and field
- Event: Triple jump
- Retired: 30 September 2018

Achievements and titles
- Personal best: 13.25 m (2012)
Medal record
Women's athletics
Representing Japan
East Asian Games
| Silver medal – second place | 2009 Hong Kong | Triple jump |

Sayuri Takeda (竹田 小百合, Takeda Sayuri; born 29 August 1989 in Hakodate) is a Japanese retired triple jumper. She was the 2009 East Asian Games silver medalist and 2011 Japanese national champion.

== Personal best ==
| Event | Measure | Competition | Venue | Date |
|---|---|---|---|---|
| Triple jump | 13.25 m (wind: +2.0 m/s) | Singapore Open Championships | Singapore | 26 August 2012 |

== International competition ==
| Year | Competition | Venue | Position | Event | Measure |
Representing Japan
| 2009 | East Asian Games | Hong Kong, China | 2nd | Triple jump | 12.80 m (wind: +1.3 m/s) |
| 2010 | Asian Indoor Championships | Tehran, Iran | 4th | Triple jump | 12.55 m |
| 2011 | Asian Championships | Kobe, Japan | 11th | Triple jump | 12.88 m (wind: +2.9 m/s) |

== National title ==
- Japanese Championships
  - Triple jump: 2011
