= 2011 Asian Athletics Championships – Women's triple jump =

The women's triple jump at the 2011 Asian Athletics Championships was held at the Kobe Universiade Memorial Stadium on 9 July.

== Results ==
Rank	Athlete	Nationality	#1	#2	#3	#4	#5	#6	Result	Notes
1st place, gold medalist(s)	Xie Limei	China	14.17w	14.25	13.60	14.54	14.25	13.63	14.54	SB
2nd place, silver medalist(s)	Valeriya Kanatova	Uzbekistan	13.82w	14.14w	13.79w	13.85	13.72	14.05	14.14w	
3rd place, bronze medalist(s)	Mayookha Johny	India	13.68	13.72	14.03	14.11	13.88	13.62	14.11	NR
4	Li Yanmei	China	13.97	x	13.12	13.68	13.25	13.31	13.97	
5	Anastasiya Juravleva	Uzbekistan	x	13.88	x	13.68	13.87	13.57w	13.88	
6	Irina Ektova	Kazakhstan	13.49	x	x	x	13.88	13.43	13.88	SB
7	Prajusha Maliakhal Anthony	India	13.19w	13.08	13.41	11.81	x	13.63	13.63	
8	Jung Hye Kyung	South Korea	13.14w	x	13.34w	13.52w	x	x	13.52w	
9	Thitima Muangjan	Thailand	x	13.16	x				13.16	
10	Nor Amira Mohamad Nafiah	Malaysia	x	x	13.04				13.04	
11	Sayuri Takeda	Japan	12.49w	12.88w	12.74				12.88w	
12	Tse Mang Chi	Hong Kong	12.06	12.10w	11.88				12.10w	
