= Aleksandra Kotlyarova =

Uzbekistani triple jumper (born 1988)

Personal information
- Born: October 10, 1988 (age 37) Samarkand, Uzbekistan
- Height: 1.75 m (5 ft 9 in)
- Weight: 60 kg (132 lb)

Sport
- Country: Uzbekistan
- Sport: Athletics
- Event: Triple jump
Medal record
Women's athletics
Representing Uzbekistan
Asian Indoor Championships
Silver medal – second place	2014 Hangzhou	Triple jump

Aleksandra Kotlyarova (born 10 October 1988, in Samarkand) is an Uzbekistani athlete specializing in the triple jump.

== International competitions ==
Year	Competition	Venue	Position	Event	Notes
Representing Uzbekistan
2005	World Youth Championships	Marrakesh, Morocco	19th (q)	Long jump	5.85 m
2006	Asian Junior Championships	Macau	1st	Long jump	6.02 m
2006	World Junior Championships	Beijing, China	28th (q)	Long jump	5.39 m (wind: -0.2 m/s)
2009	Asian Indoor Games	Hanoi, Vietnam	4th	Long jump	6.26 m
2009	Asian Indoor Games	Hanoi, Vietnam	5th	Triple jump	13.58 m
2009	Asian Championships	Guangzhou, China	4th	Long jump	6.23 m
2009	Asian Championships	Guangzhou, China	4th	Triple jump	13.94 m
2010	World Indoor Championships	Doha, Qatar	14th (q)	Triple jump	13.45 m
2010	Asian Games	Guangzhou, China	11th	Long jump	6.00 m
2010	Asian Games	Guangzhou, China	4th	Triple jump	13.73 m
2011	Asian Championships	Kobe, Japan	8th	Long jump	6.16 m
2011	World Games	Daegu, South Korea	24th (q)	Triple jump	13.78 m
2012	World Indoor Championships	Istanbul, Turkey	13th (q)	Triple jump	13.95 m
2012	Olympic Games	London, United Kingdom	28th (q)	Triple jump	13.55 m
2013	Asian Championships	Pune, India	2nd	Triple jump	13.89 m
2014	Asian Indoor Championships	Hangzhou, China	2nd	Triple jump	13.45 m
2014	Asian Games	Incheon, South Korea	2nd	Triple jump	14.05 m
2015	Asian Championships	Wuhan, China	4th	Triple jump	13.40 m

== Personal bests ==
Outdoor

- Long Jump – 6.43 m (+1.7 m/s) (Tashkent 2011)
- Triple Jump – 14.35 m (+1.4 m/s) (Tashkent 2011)

Indoor

- Long Jump – 6.46 m (Krasnodar 2010)
- Triple Jump – 14.09 m (Tashkent 2010)
