= Thitima Muangjan =

Thai triple jumper

Medal record

Women's athletics

Representing Thailand

Asian Indoor Championships
Bronze medal – third place	2006 Pattaya	Triple jump

Thitima Muangjan (born 13 April 1983) is a Thai athlete who specialises in the triple jump. She has won multiple medals at the regional level. She is the Thai record holder indoors and out. Her best international performance was a bronze medal at the 2010 Asian Games.

== Competition record ==
Year	Competition	Venue	Position	Event	Notes
Representing Thailand
2002	Asian Junior Championships	Bangkok, Thailand	8th	Long jump	5.92 m
2002	Asian Junior Championships	Bangkok, Thailand	7th	Triple jump	12.40 m
2003	Asian Championships	Manila, Philippines	10th	Triple jump	12.79 m
2005	Universiade	İzmir, Turkey	9th	Triple jump	13.10 m
2005	Asian Championships	Incheon, South Korea	7th	Triple jump	13.16 m
2005	Asian Indoor Games	Pattaya, Thailand	3rd	Triple jump	12.95 m
2006	Asian Indoor Championships	Pattaya, Thailand	3rd	Triple jump	12.64 m
2007	Universiade	Bangkok, Thailand	32nd (q)	Long jump	3.84 m
2007	Universiade	Bangkok, Thailand	7th	Triple jump	13.62 m
2007	Asian Indoor Games	Macau	2nd	Long jump	6.04 m
2007	Asian Indoor Games	Macau	2nd	Triple jump	13.42 m
2007	Southeast Asian Games	Vientiane, Laos	2nd	Long jump	6.25 m
2007	Southeast Asian Games	Vientiane, Laos	1st	Triple jump	13.85 m
2008	Asian Indoor Championships	Doha, Qatar	5th	Triple jump	12.98 m
2009	Universiade	Belgrade, Serbia	20th (q)	Long jump	5.74 m
2009	Universiade	Belgrade, Serbia	8th	Triple jump	13.44 m
2009	Asian Indoor Games	Hanoi, Vietnam	6th	Long jump	6.18 m
2009	Asian Indoor Games	Hanoi, Vietnam	3rd	Triple jump	13.78 m
2009	Southeast Asian Games	Vientiane, Laos	2nd	Long jump	6.35 m
2009	Southeast Asian Games	Vientiane, Laos	1st	Triple jump	14.08 m
2010	World Indoor Championships	Doha, Qatar	18th (q)	Triple jump	13.19 m
2010	Asian Games	Guangzhou, China	3rd	Triple jump	13.85 m
2011	Asian Championships	Kobe, Japan	9th	Triple jump	13.16 m
2011	Universiade	Shenzhen, China	11th	Triple jump	13.52 m
2011	Southeast Asian Games	Palembang, Indonesia	3rd	Triple jump	13.64 m
2013	Southeast Asian Games	Naypyidaw, Myanmar	2nd	Long jump	6.24 m
2013	Southeast Asian Games	Naypyidaw, Myanmar	2nd	Triple jump	14.16 m
2014	Asian Indoor Championships	Hangzhou, China	5th	Triple jump	13.25 m
2014	Asian Games	Incheon, South Korea	6th	Triple jump	13.68 m

== Personal bests ==
Outdoor

- Long jump – 6.35 (+0.3 m/s) (Vientiane 2009)
- Triple jump – 14.08 (+0.5 m/s) (Vientiane 2009) NR

Indoor

- Long jump – 6.18 (Hanoi 2009) NR
- Triple jump – 13.78 (Hanoi 2009) NR
