= Anna Pyatykh =

Russian triple jumper (born 1981)

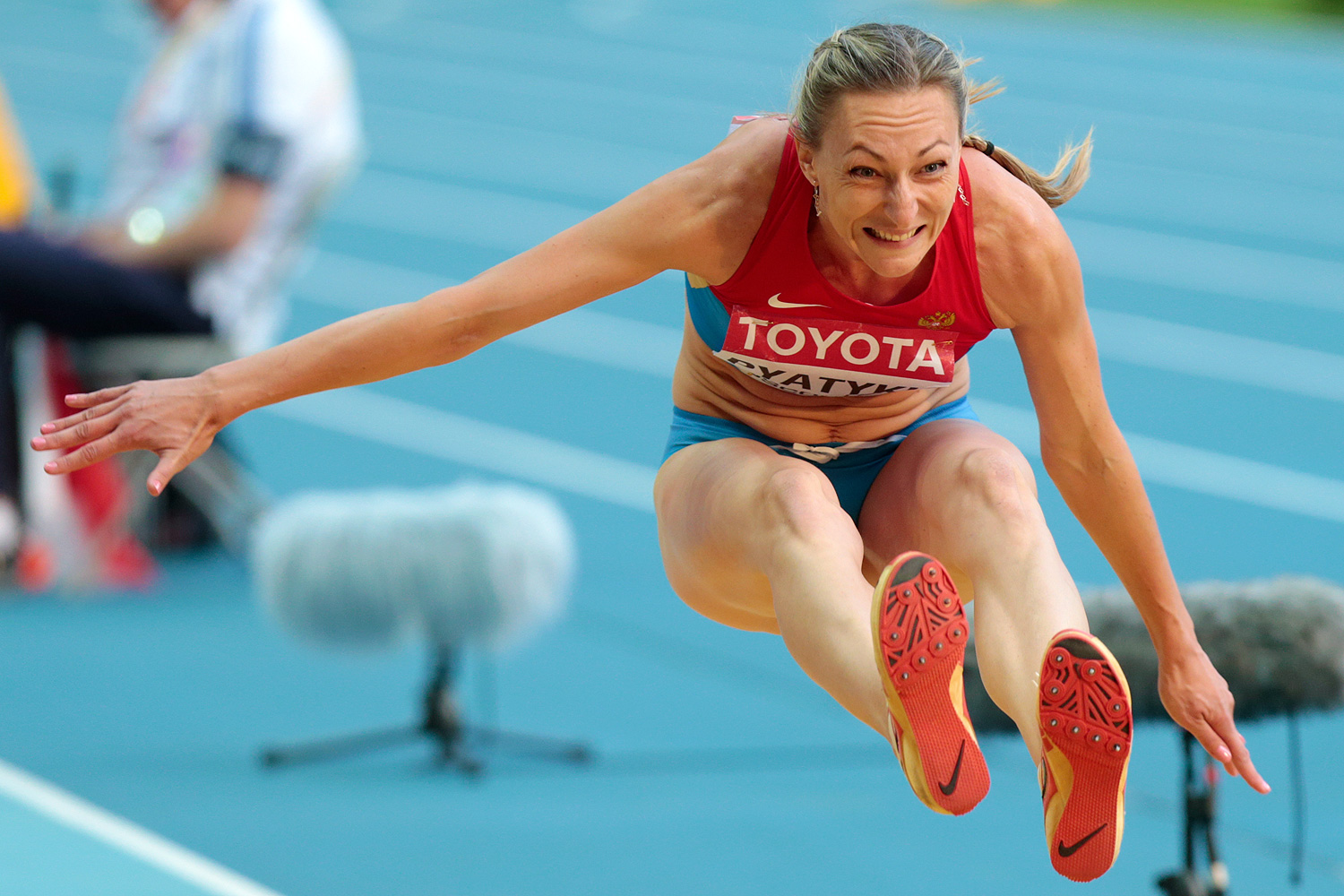
- Anna Pyatykh at the 2013 World Championships

Medal record

Women's athletics

Representing Russia

World Championships
Bronze medal – third place	2005 Helsinki	Triple jump
Bronze medal – third place	2009 Berlin	Triple jump

World Indoor Championships
Silver medal – second place	2006 Moscow	Triple jump
Bronze medal – third place	2010 Doha	Triple jump

European Championships
Bronze medal – third place	2006 Gothenburg	Triple jump

Anna Viktorovna Pyatykh (Russian: Анна Викторовна Пятых) (born April 4, 1981, in Moscow) is a professional Russian triple jumper. She has won the SPAR European Cup four consecutive times, won bronze medals at the 2005 World Championships in Helsinki and 2009 World Championships in Berlin. She has also competed at the 2004 Athens Olympics.

In 2006, she finished second at the 2006 IAAF World Indoor Championships behind countrywoman Tatyana Lebedeva.

She received a retrospective ban for doping after retest of her samples, resulting in the disqualification of her results at the IAAF World Championships in Osaka, Japan on 31 August 2007, and from 6 July 2013 to 15 December 2016.

== International competitions ==
Representing Russia
Year	Competition	Venue	Position	Result	Notes
1999	European Junior Championships	Riga, Latvia	3rd	13.36 m	
2000	World Junior Championships	Santiago, Chile	2nd	14.18 m	wind: +1.2 m/s
2002	European Championships	Munich, Germany	8th	14.08 m	
2003	World Indoor Championships	Birmingham, United Kingdom	4th	14.35 m	
2003	World Championships	Paris, France	4th	14.72 m	
2004	Olympic Games	Athens, Greece	8th	14.79 m	
2005	World Championships	Helsinki, Finland	3rd	14.78 m	
2006	World Indoor Championships	Moscow, Russia	2nd	14.93 m	
2006	European Championships	Gothenburg, Sweden	3rd	15.02 m	
2007	World Championships	Osaka, Japan	DSQ (4th)	14.88 m	Doping
2008	World Indoor Championships	Valencia, Spain	11th	13.99 m	
2008	Olympic Games	Beijing, China	8th	14.73 m	
2009	World Championships	Berlin, Germany	3rd	14.58 m	
2010	World Indoor Championships	Doha, Qatar	3rd	14.64 m	
2013	World Championships	Moscow, Russia	DSQ (7th)	14.29 m	Doping

== See also ==
- List of doping cases in athletics
- List of World Athletics Championships medalists (women)
- List of European Athletics Championships medalists (women)
- List of IAAF World Indoor Championships medalists (women)
- Doping in Russia
- Doping at the World Athletics Championships
- Doping at the Olympic Games
