= Athletics at the 2014 Asian Games – Women's triple jump =

Women's triple jump at the 2014 Asian Games
- Venue: Incheon Asiad Main Stadium
- Dates: 1 October 2014
- Competitors: 17 from 13 nations

Medalists
gold medal	Olga Rypakova	Kazakhstan
silver medal	Aleksandra Kotlyarova	Uzbekistan
bronze medal	Irina Ektova	Kazakhstan

The women's triple jump event at the 2014 Asian Games was held at the Incheon Asiad Main Stadium, Incheon, South Korea on 1 October.

== Schedule ==
All times are Korea Standard Time (UTC+09:00)

Date	Time	Event
Wednesday, 1 October 2014	18:55	Final

== Records ==
Prior to this competition, the existing world, Asian and Games records were as follows.

World Record	Inessa Kravets (UKR)	15.50	Gothenburg, Sweden	10 August 1995
Asian Record	Olga Rypakova (KAZ)	15.25	Split, Croatia	4 September 2010
Games Record	Olga Rypakova (KAZ)	14.78	Guangzhou, China	25 November 2010

== Results ==
Legend

- DNS — Did not stat
- NM — No mark

Rank	Athlete	Attempt						Result	Notes
Rank	Athlete	1	2	3	4	5	6	Result	Notes
1st place, gold medalist(s)	Olga Rypakova (KAZ)	13.75 −0.4	X +1.1	14.30 +0.3	X −0.1	14.32 +0.4	13.73 +0.4	14.32	
2nd place, silver medalist(s)	Aleksandra Kotlyarova (UZB)	14.05 +0.2	12.03 +0.7	13.36 −0.1	13.31 −0.3	13.46 −0.1	X +0.4	14.05	
3rd place, bronze medalist(s)	Irina Ektova (KAZ)	12.80 +1.0	13.63 −0.3	X −0.5	X +0.4	13.62 +0.1	13.77 −0.1	13.77	
4	Li Yanmei (CHN)	13.71 +0.3	13.55 +0.2	13.31 −1.1	13.49 −0.1	13.32 +0.1	13.66 +0.4	13.71	
5	Deng Lina (CHN)	X +0.7	13.30 +0.8	13.71 +0.5	13.53 +0.4	X −0.1	X −0.1	13.71	
6	Thitima Muangjan (THA)	13.68 +1.1	13.57 +0.4	X −0.4	13.42 +0.2	X +0.1	13.20; 0.0	13.68	
7	Anastasiya Juravleva (UZB)	13.64 +1.0	13.61 +0.4	X −0.6	13.16 +0.2	12.95 +0.2	X +0.1	13.64	
8	Trần Huệ Hoa (VIE)	13.58 +0.5	13.29 +0.3	13.25 −0.5	13.37 +0.4	13.25 +0.5	13.09 +0.4	13.58	
9	Mayookha Johny (IND)	13.31 +0.5	13.50 +1.1	13.24 +1.0				13.50	
10	Maria Natalia Londa (INA)	13.39 +0.4	13.04 +0.1	X +0.6				13.39	
11	Noor Amira Nafiah (MAS)	X +0.4	12.43 +0.6	13.12 −0.5				13.12	
12	Bae Chan-mi (KOR)	X 0.0	X +0.5	12.81 +0.3				12.81	
13	Hung Pei-ning (TPE)	12.74 +0.7	—	X +0.5				12.74	
14	Laenly Phoutthavong (LAO)	12.26 +0.3	12.19 +0.1	12.15 −0.5				12.26	
15	Keshari Chaudhari (NEP)	11.32 +0.8	11.29 +0.2	X −1.0				11.32	
—	M. A. Prajusha (IND)	X +0.8	—	—				NM	
—	Badia Camara (QAT)							DNS	
