= 2013 Asian Athletics Championships – Women's triple jump =

The women's triple jump at the 2013 Asian Athletics Championships was held at the Shree Shiv Chhatrapati Sports Complex on 5 July.

== Results ==
Rank	Name	Nationality	#1	#2	#3	#4	#5	#6	Result	Notes
1st place, gold medalist(s)	Anastasiya Juravleva	Uzbekistan	14.18	14.00	x	x	x		14.18	
2nd place, silver medalist(s)	Aleksandra Kotlyarova	Uzbekistan	13.51	13.54	13.45	13.49	13.89	13.67	13.89	
3rd place, bronze medalist(s)	Irina Ektova	Kazakhstan	13.75	13.30	13.28	13.39	x	x	13.75	
4	Li Xiaohong	China	x	x	12.90	13.51	13.57	x	13.57	
5	Tran Hue Hoa	Vietnam	12.84	x	13.26	x	x	13.28	13.28	
6	Lyudmila Grankovskaya	Kazakhstan	12.44	x	12.87	12.96	x	12.95	12.96	
7	Amitha Baby	India	12.57	12.27	12.33	12.02	12.34	12.36	12.57	
8	Keshari Chaudhari	Nepal	11.02	11.36	11.20	11.29	11.56	11.41	11.56	
	Mayookha Johny	India							DNS	
