= Xie Limei =

Chinese triple jumper (born 1986)

Personal information
- Born: June 27, 1986 (age 40) Fujian Province, China
- Height: 1.68 m (5 ft 6 in)
- Weight: 50 kg (110 lb)

Sport
- Country: China
- Sport: Athletics
- Event: Triple jump
Medal record
Women's athletics
Representing China
Asian Championships
Gold medal – first place	2005 Incheon	Triple jump
Asian Indoor Championships
Gold medal – first place	2004 Tehran	Triple jump
Gold medal – first place	2012 Hangzhou	Triple jump

Xie Limei (simplified Chinese: 谢荔梅; traditional Chinese: 謝荔梅; pinyin: Xiè Lìméi; born June 27, 1986) is a Chinese triple jumper.

She won the silver medal at the 2004 World Junior Championships and gold medals at the 2005 Asian Championships and the 2006 Asian Games. She also competed at the 2006 World Indoor Championships without reaching the final. She then finished eighth at the 2007 World Championships and the 2008 World Indoor Championships.

Her personal best jump is 14.90 metres, achieved in September 2007 in Urumqi.

== Competition record ==
Year	Competition	Venue	Position	Notes
Representing China
2004	Asian Indoor Championships	Tehran, Iran	1st	13.39 m
2004	World Junior Championships	Grosseto, Italy	2nd	13.77 m (wind: +1.3 m/s)
2005	Asian Championships	Incheon, South Korea	1st	14.38 m
2005	East Asian Games	Macau	2nd	13.65 m
2006	World Indoor Championships	Moscow, Russia	14th (q)	13.75 m
2006	Asian Games	Doha, Qatar	1st	14.37 m
2007	World Championships	Osaka, Japan	8th	14.50 m
2008	World Indoor Championships	Valencia, Spain	8th	14.13 m
2008	Olympic Games	Beijing, China	12th	14.09 m
2009	World Championships	Berlin, Germany	9th	14.16 m
2010	World Indoor Championships	Doha, Qatar	7th	14.03 m
2010	Asian Games	Guangzhou, China	2nd	14.18 m
2011	Asian Championships	Kobe, Japan	1st	14.54 m
2011	World Championships	Daegu, South Korea	25th (q)	13.75 m
2012	Asian Indoor Championships	Hangzhou, China	1st	14.06 m
2012	World Indoor Championships	Istanbul, Turkey	23rd (q)	13.54 m
2012	Olympic Games	London, United Kingdom	23rd (q)	13.69 m
