= Yamilé Aldama =

Cuban-born triple jumper (born 1972)

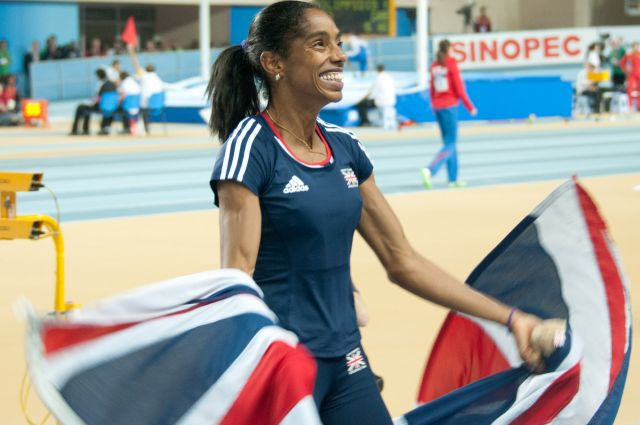
- Aldama at the 2012 World Indoor Championships in Istanbul.

Personal information
- Born: 14 August 1972 (age 54) Havana, Cuba
- Height: 1.72 m (5 ft 7 1/2 in)
- Weight: 62 kg (137 lb)

Sport
- Country: Great Britain
- Sport: Athletics
- Event: Triple jump

Achievements and titles
- Personal best: 15.29 (Rome 2003)
Medal record
Women's athletics
Event	1st	2nd	3rd
IAAF World Outdoor / Indoor Championships	1	2	1
IAAF World Athletics Final / World Cup	0	1	4
Pan-American Games	1	0	0
Africa Games / Championships	3	1	0
CAC Games / Championships / U20s	2	1	1
Ibero-American / Pan Arab Games	2	2	0
Total	9	7	6
Representing Cuba
World Championships
Silver medal – second place	1999 Seville	Triple jump
Pan-American Games
Gold medal – first place	1999 Winnipeg	Triple jump
CAC Games
Gold medal – first place	1998 Maracaibo	Triple jump
CAC Championships
Silver medal – second place	1997 San Juan	Triple jump
Ibero-American Championships
Gold medal – first place	1996 Medellín	Triple jump
Gold medal – first place	1998 Lisbon	Triple jump
Representing Sudan
World Indoor Championships
Silver medal – second place	2004 Budapest	Triple jump
Bronze medal – third place	2006 Moscow	Triple jump
All-Africa Games
Gold medal – first place	2007 Algiers	Triple jump
African Championships
Gold medal – first place	2004 Brazzaville	Triple jump
Gold medal – first place	2006 Bambous	Triple jump
Silver medal – second place	2008 Addis Ababa	Triple jump
Pan-Arab Games
Silver medal – second place	2007 Cairo	High jump
Silver medal – second place	2007 Cairo	Triple jump
Representing Great Britain
World Indoor Championships
Gold medal – first place	2012 Istanbul	Triple jump
- Updated on 15 August 2012

Yamilé Aldama Pozo (Arabic: جميلة الداما; born 14 August 1972) is a Cuban-born triple jumper. She represented Cuba until 2003, Sudan from 2004 to 2010, then Great Britain from 2011 onwards. A four-time Olympian (2000–12), she won a silver medal at the 1999 World Championships and a gold medal at the 2012 World Indoor Championships.

== Life and career ==
Aldama was born in Havana, Cuba, and initially represented her country of birth. At first she competed in high jump and heptathlon events, but in 1994 she tried triple jump and two years later qualified for the Olympic team for 1996 Summer Olympics. Unable to compete there due to injury next year she reached the final at the 1997 IAAF World Indoor Championships finishing in sixth place. Two years later she won her only medal to date at the major international final taking silver medal at the 1999 World Championships in Athletics in Seville, Spain. The next year at the 2000 Summer Olympics she finished in fourth position thus cementing her place as an elite triple jumper.

In 2001, she married Andrew Dodds, a Scottish television producer, and thereafter relocated to the United Kingdom. Following her marriage she applied for British citizenship. However, shortly after, her husband was sentenced to 15 years for his part in trafficking heroin valued at £40million. Unconnected to the offence herself, she decided to remain in the United Kingdom with her husband. As she had not lived in Britain before, she had to wait the mandatory three-year period to achieve a passport. She expressed her decision to represent Great Britain at the 2004 Summer Olympics, and was supported by David Moorcroft. Due to this she did not take part in the 2003 World Championships as this would have hindered her chance to switch allegiance to Great Britain.

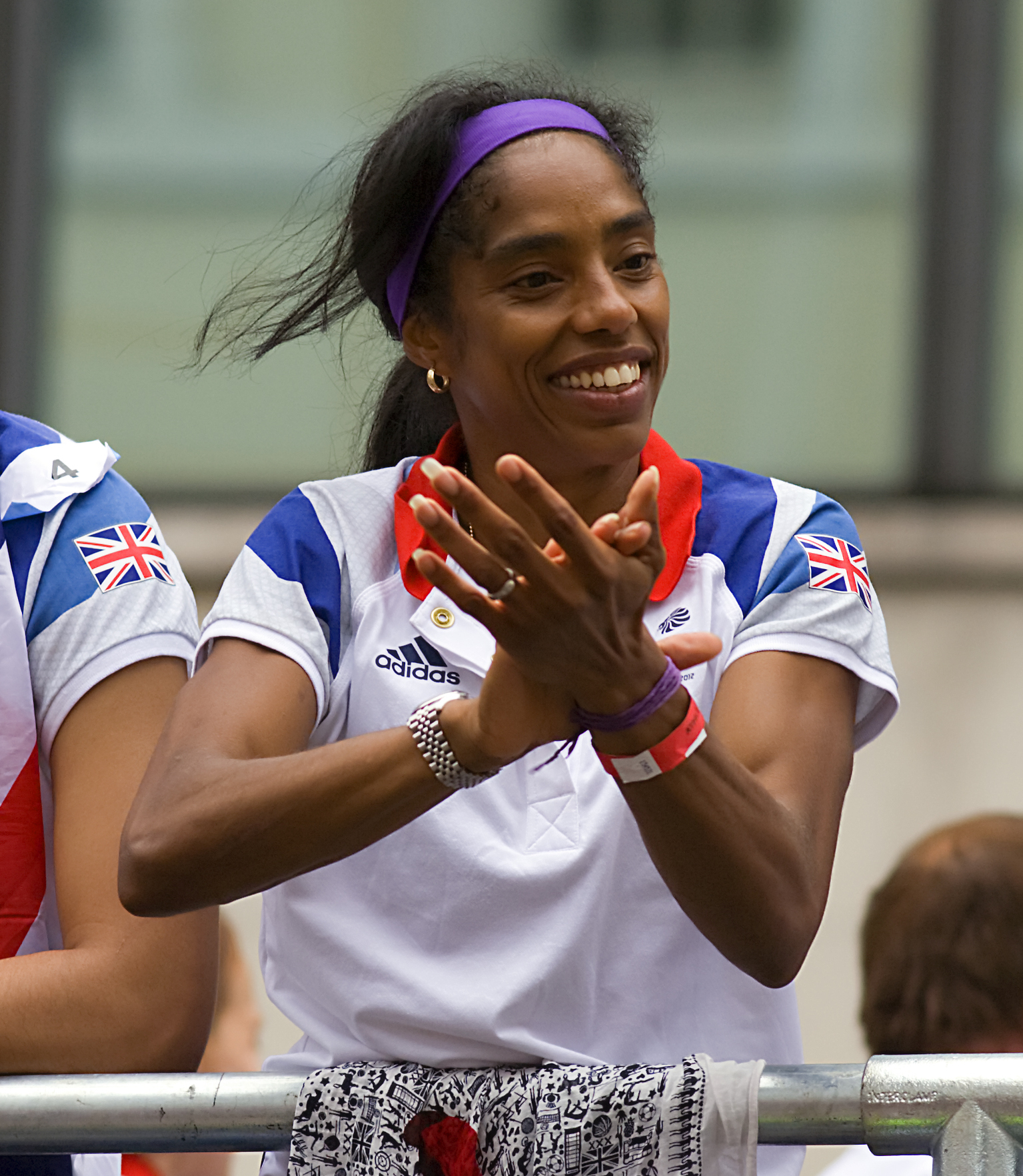
Aldama - 2012 Parade

However, in 2004 the British passport agency refused to push forward her application for a passport. As she moved to Great Britain in November 2001, she would not have been eligible for a passport until November 2004, three months after the Olympics. Aldama instead sought a new country to represent, and after offers from Spain, Italy, and the Czech Republic she instead switched to Sudan.

After acquiring Sudanese citizenship on 23 January 2004, she went to represent Sudan at the 2004 Summer Olympics where she finished in fifth place. In 2004, she also broke the Sudanese triple jump record achieving 15.28 metres. After again taking fourth place at the 2005 World Championships in Athletics she missed the finals at the 2007 and 2009 World Championships as well as the final of 2008 Summer Olympics.

On 5 February 2010, nearly ten years after her initial application, she finally gained British citizenship and a year later, now competing as a Great Britain representative, took fifth-place finish at the 2011 World Championships in Athletics.

On 9 March 2012, at the age of 39 years, Aldama became the IAAF World Indoor Champion in Triple Jump, in Istanbul, Turkey, the second oldest athlete ever to achieve the feat. In the process, just over five months before her 40th birthday, she improved upon the Masters W35 record twice. The indoor results have not been ratified as a world record, but later in May she jumped 14.65 at the Rome Diamond League meet to set what is the current record. On that jump, she landed awkwardly and injured her shoulder. She had to compete in the 2012 Olympics, less than a month short of 40 years old, with the injury still finishing fifth.

At the British Athletics Writers' Association awards in October 2012, Aldama collected the BAWA's 2012 Inspiration award. She also finished third behind winner Jessica Ennis and Christine Ohuruogu in the placings for "British Athlete of the Year".

In January 2013, Aldama made the decision to represent Scotland at the 2014 Commonwealth Games, making her the first athlete to have competed for four different nations. She achieved the feat by participating in this competition, albeit on behalf of England instead.

== Achievements ==
Year	Competition	Venue	Position	Event	Notes
Representing Cuba
1988	CAC Junior Championships (U-20)	Nassau, Bahamas	1st	High jump	1.78 m
1988	CAC Junior Championships (U-20)	Nassau, Bahamas	4th	Long jump	5.48 m
1990	CAC Junior Championships (U-20)	Havana, Cuba	3rd	High jump	1.70 m
1996	Ibero-American Championships	Medellín, Colombia	1st	Triple jump	14.39 m CR
1997	World Indoor Championships	Paris, France	6th	Triple jump	14.28 m
1997	Central American and Caribbean Championships	San Juan, Puerto Rico	2nd	Triple jump	14.12 m w
1997	World Championships	Athens, Greece	13th (q)	Triple jump	14.09 m (0.0 m/s)
1998	Ibero-American Championships	Lisbon, Portugal	1st	Triple jump	14.07 m
1998	Central American and Caribbean Games	Maracaibo, Venezuela	1st	Triple jump	14.34 m
1998	World Cup	Johannesburg, South Africa	3rd	Triple jump	14.29 m (0.6 m/s)
1999	World Indoor Championships	Maebashi, Japan	7th	Triple jump	14.47 m
1999	World Championships	Seville, Spain	2nd	Triple jump	14.61 m (−0.4 m/s)
1999	IAAF Grand Prix Final	Munich, Germany	7th	Triple jump	14.18 m (−0.2 m/s)
1999	Pan American Games	Winnipeg, Canada	1st	Triple jump	14.77 m CR
2000	Olympic Games	Sydney	4th	Triple jump	14.30 m (−0.9 m/s)
2003	World Athletics Final	Monte Carlo, Monaco	2nd	Triple jump	14.99 m (0.2 m/s)
Representing Sudan
2004	World Indoor Championships	Budapest, Hungary	2nd	Triple jump	14.90 m
2004	African Championships	Brazzaville, Republic of the Congo	1st	Triple jump	14.90 m
2004	Olympic Games	Athens, Greece	5th	Triple jump	14.99 m (0.1 m/s)
2004	World Athletics Final	Monte Carlo, Monaco	3rd	Triple jump	14.92 m (0.2 m/s)
2005	World Championships	Helsinki, Finland	4th	Triple jump	14.72 m (0.8 m/s)
2005	World Athletics Final	Monte Carlo, Monaco	6th	Triple jump	14.26 m (0.8 m/s)
2006	World Indoor Championships	Moscow, Russia	3rd	Triple jump	14.86 m
2006	African Championships	Bambous, Mauritius	1st	Triple jump	14.71 m w (2.6 m/s)
2006	World Athletics Final	Stuttgart, Germany	3rd	Triple jump	14.67 m (−0.1 m/s)
2006	World Cup	Athens, Greece	3rd	Triple jump	14.78 m (1.0 m/s)
2007	All-Africa Games	Algiers, Algeria	1st	Triple jump	14.46 m
2007	World Athletics Final	Stuttgart, Germany	4th	Triple jump	14.41 m (0.3 m/s)
2007	Pan Arab Games	Cairo, Egypt	2nd	High jump	1.77 m
2007	Pan Arab Games	Cairo, Egypt	2nd	Long jump	6.05 m
2007	World Championships	Osaka, Japan	12th (q)	Triple jump	13.46 m (−0.2 m/s)
2008	World Indoor Championships	Valencia, Spain	5th	Triple jump	14.47 m
2008	African Championships	Addis Ababa, Ethiopia	2nd	Triple jump	14.36 m SB
2009	World Championships	Berlin, Germany	13th (q)	Triple jump	14.11 m (0.1 m/s)
2009	World Athletics Final	Thessaloniki, Greece	4th	Triple jump	14.39 m (−1.0 m/s)
2010	World Indoor Championships	Doha, Qatar	19th (q)	Triple jump	12.41 m
Representing Great Britain
2011	World Championships	Daegu, South Korea	5th	Triple jump	14.50 m (0.4 m/s)
2012	World Indoor Championships	Istanbul, Turkey	1st	Triple jump	14.82 m
2012	Olympic Games	London, United Kingdom	5th	Triple jump	14.48 m (−0.6 m/s)
2013	European Indoor Championships	Gothenburg, Sweden	6th	Triple jump	13.95 m
2013	European Team Championships	Gateshead, United Kingdom	4th	Triple jump	13.90 m +1.7
2014	European Team Championships	Braunschweig, Germany	6th	Triple jump	13.31 m +0.4
Representing England
2014	Commonwealth Games	Glasgow, United Kingdom	7th (q)	Triple jump	13.29 m
