= Biljana Topić =

Serbian triple jumper

Personal information
- Nationality: Serbian
- Born: Biljana Mitrović; 17 October 1977 (age 49) Šabac, SR Serbia, SFR Yugoslavia
- Height: 1.80 m (5 ft 11 in)
- Weight: 60.0 kg (132.3 lb; 9.45 st)

Sport
- Country: Serbia
- Sport: Track and field
- Event: Triple Jump

Achievements and titles
- Personal bests: Outdoor: 14.56 m Indoor: 14.37 m
Medal record
World Athletics Final
Silver medal – second place	2009 Thessaloniki	Triple jump

Biljana Topić née Mitrović, (Serbian Cyrillic: Биљана Топић Митровић, born 17 October 1977) is a Serbian former track and field athlete and a current National record holder in both indoor and outdoor triple jump and as part of the 4 × 100 m relay national team. She achieved her best results in triple jump, having switched from sprint disciplines in which she had competed early in her career. She competed at three Olympic Games (4 × 100 m relay in 2000 and triple jump in 2008 and 2012).

== Career ==
Topić competed at 2008 Summer Olympics, where she was 4 centimeters short of making the final. She also competed in two World Championships, one World Indoor Championship and two European Indoor Championships. Her best results were all achieved in 2009 — silver medal with new national record of 14.56 m at IAAF World Athletics Final, fourth place with then national record of 14.52 m in World Championships, and fourth place in European Indoor Championships.

Topić is the current holder of Serbian national triple jump outdoor record and as part of the 4 × 100 m relay national team.

== Personal bests ==
=== Outdoor ===
Event	Performance	Date	Location	Notes
Triple Jump	14.56 m	September 13, 2009	Thessaloniki, Greece	NR

=== Indoor ===
Event	Performance	Date	Location	Notes
Triple Jump	14.37 m	March 8, 2009	Turin, Italy	NR

== Achievements ==
Year	Competition	Venue	Position	Event	Notes
Representing FR Yugoslavia
1996	World Junior Championships	Sydney, Australia	23rd (qf)	200 m	24.72 (wind: -3.1 m/s)
1996	World Junior Championships	Sydney, Australia	9th (h)	4 × 400 m relay	3:44.34
1997	Universiade	Catania, Italy	20th (qf)	200 m	24.42
1997	Universiade	Catania, Italy	20th (h)	400 m	55.15
1999	European U23 Championships	Gothenburg, Sweden	15th (h)	200 m	24.04 (wind: 0.1 m/s)
1999	European U23 Championships	Gothenburg, Sweden	—	400 m	DQ
1999	European U23 Championships	Gothenburg, Sweden	10th (h)	4 × 400 m relay	3:37.10
Representing Serbia
2008	World Indoor Championships	Valencia, Spain	12th (q)	Triple jump	13.97 m
2008	Olympic Games	Beijing, China	13th (q)	Triple jump	14.14 m
2009	European Indoor Championships	Turin, Italy	4th	Triple jump	14.37 m
2009	World Championships	Berlin, Germany	4th	Triple jump	14.52 m
2009	World Final	Thessaloniki, Greece	2nd	Triple jump	14.56 m
2011	European Indoor Championships	Paris, France	10th (q)	Triple jump	13.93 m
2011	World Championships	Daegu, South Korea	10th	Triple jump	14.03 m
2012	Olympic Games	London, United Kingdom	25th	Triple jump	13.66

== Personal life ==
Her husband is Serbian former high jumper and national record holder Dragutin Topić, who was also her personal trainer. Their daughter, Angelina Topić is the current European U18 high jump champion and also holds the national record in high jump.

== See also ==
- Serbian records in athletics
