= Mabel Gay =

Cuban triple jumper (born 1983)

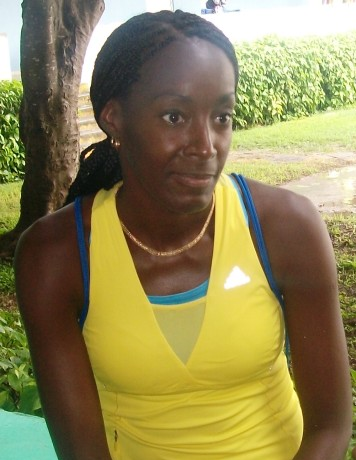
- Gay in 2008

Personal information
- Full name: Mabel Gay Tamayo
- Born: 5 May 1983 (age 43) Santiago de Cuba, Cuba
- Height: 1.83 m (6 ft 0 in)
- Weight: 64 kg (141 lb)

Sport
- Country: Cuba
- Sport: Athletics
Medal record
Women's athletics
Representing Cuba
World Championships
Silver medal – second place	2009 Berlin	Triple jump
World Indoor Championships
Bronze medal – third place	2012 Istanbul	Triple jump
CAC Junior Championships (U20)
Gold medal – first place	2002 Bridgetown	Triple jump
- Updated on 27 January 2015

Mabel Gay Tamayo (born 5 May 1983) is a Cuban triple jumper.

Her personal best jump is 14.67 metres, achieved in September 2011 in Daegu.

== Personal bests ==
Outdoor

- Long jump: 6.28 m – Rio de Janeiro, Brazil, 17 May 2009
- Triple jump: 14.67 m – Daegu, South Korea, 1 September 2011

Indoor

- Triple jump: 14.57 m – Budapest, Hungary, 5 March 2004

== Achievements ==
Year	Competition	Venue	Position	Notes
Representing Cuba
1998	World Youth Games	Moscow, Russia	10th (q)	1.65 m (High jump)
1998	World Youth Games	Moscow, Russia	1st	13.41 m (wind: -1.0 m/s)
1999	World Youth Championships	Bydgoszcz, Poland	1st	13.82 m (wind: +0.2 m/s)
2000	World Junior Championships	Santiago, Chile	4th	13.74 m w (wind: +3.2 m/s)
2001	Pan American Junior Championships	Santa Fe, Argentina	1st	13.63 m
2002	Ibero-American Championships	Guatemala City, Guatemala	1st	14.18 m
2002	CAC Junior Championships (U20)	Bridgetown, Barbados	1st	13.93 m
2002	World Junior Championships	Kingston, Jamaica	1st	14.09 m (wind: +1.3 m/s)
2003	Pan American Games	Santo Domingo, Dominican Republic	1st	14.42 m
2003	World Championships	Paris, France	5th	14.52 m (PB)
2004	World Indoor Championships	Budapest, Hungary	9th	14.49 m
2005	Central American and Caribbean Championships	Nassau, Bahamas	2nd	13.97 m
2005	World Championships	Helsinki, Finland	18th (q)	13.83 m
2006	World Indoor Championships	Moscow, Russia	12th (q)	13.93 m
2006	Central American and Caribbean Games	Cartagena, Colombia	1st	14.20 m
2007	ALBA Games	Caracas, Venezuela	2nd	14.57 m (wind: +2.0 m/s)
2007	Pan American Games	Rio de Janeiro, Brazil	3rd	14.26 m
2008	Central American and Caribbean Championships	Cali, Colombia	1st	14.19 m
2008	Olympic Games	Beijing, China	15th (q)	14.09 m
2009	ALBA Games	Havana, Cuba	2nd	14.52 m w (wind: +3.0 m/s)
2009	Central American and Caribbean Championships	Havana, Cuba	2nd	14.48 m
2009	World Championships	Berlin, Germany	2nd	14.61 m
2009	World Athletics Final	Thessaloniki, Greece	1st	14.62 (wind: +0.4 m/s)
2010	World Indoor Championships	Doha, Qatar	5th	14.30 m
2011	World Championships	Daegu, South Korea	4th	14.67 m
2011	Pan American Games	Guadalajara, Mexico	3rd	14.28 m
2012	World Indoor Championships	Istanbul, Turkey	3rd	14.29 m
2013	World Championships	Moscow, Russia	5th	14.45 m
2014	Pan American Sports Festival	Mexico City, Mexico	1st	14.53m A (wind: -0.1 m/s)
