= Marija Šestak =

Slovenian triple jumper

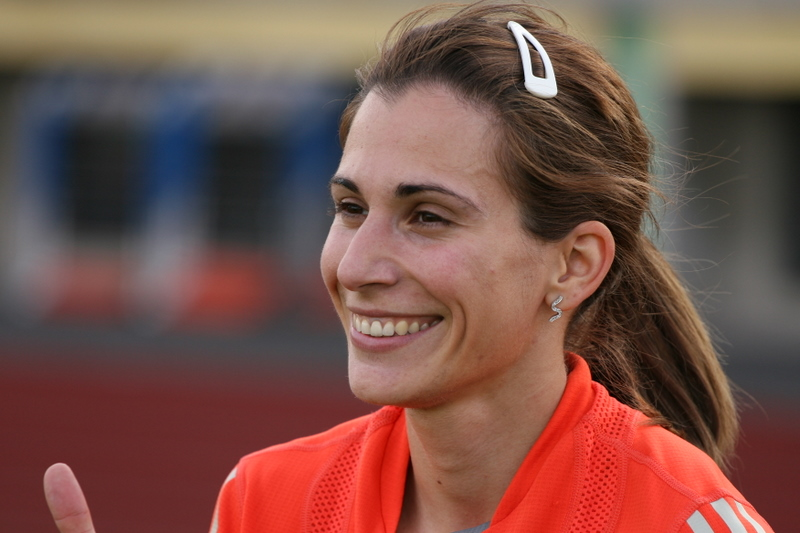

Personal information
- Born: 17 April 1979 (age 47)
- Height: 1.73 m (5 ft 8 in)
- Weight: 59 kg (130 lb)

Sport
- Country: Slovenia
- Sport: Athletics
- Event: Triple jump
Medal record
Representing Slovenia
World Championships
| Bronze medal – third place | 2007 Osaka | Triple jump |
World Indoor Championships
| Silver medal – second place | 2008 Valencia | Triple jump |
European Indoor Championships
| Silver medal – second place | 2009 Turin | Triple jump |
Representing Yugoslavia
Mediterranean Games
| Silver medal – second place | 2001 Tunis | Triple jump |
European U23 Championships
| Silver medal – second place | 2001 Amsterdam | Triple jump |
World Junior Championships
| Bronze medal – third place | 1998 Annecy | Triple jump |
European Junior Championships
| Silver medal – second place | 1997 Ljubljana | Triple jump |

Marija Šestak (Serbian Cyrillic: Марија Шестак; born Martinović, Мартиновић) is a Serbian-born Slovenian triple jumper.

Marija Martinović was born on 17 April 1979 in Kragujevac (at the time SR Serbia, SFR Yugoslavia). She is married to Slovenian 400 metres runner Matija Šestak. She was granted Slovenian citizenship on 13 July 2006.

Her personal best jump is 15.08 metres, achieved on 13 February 2008 in Athens. This is the current national record for Slovenia, beating the seven-year-old record of Anja Valant. She also has 6.50 metres in the long jump.

== Achievements ==
| Year | Competition | Venue | Position | Notes |
Representing Yugoslavia / Serbia and Montenegro
| 1996 | World Junior Championships | Sydney, Australia | 20th (q) | 12.57 m (+1.7 m/s) |
| 1997 | Mediterranean Games | Bari, Italy | 7th | 13.23 m |
| 1997 | European Junior Championships | Ljubljana, Slovenia | 2nd | 13.54 m |
| 1997 | Universiade | Catania, Italy | (q) | 13.15 m |
| 1998 | World Junior Championships | Annecy, France | 3rd | 13.47 m (+0.4 m/s) |
| 1999 | European U23 Championships | Gothenburg, Sweden | 8th | 13.14 m (+1.3 m/s) |
| 2001 | European U23 Championships | Amsterdam, Netherlands | 2nd | 13.72 m (0.0 m/s) |
| 2001 | Mediterranean Games | Radès, Tunisia | 2nd | 13.97 m (w) |
| 2002 | European Indoor Championships | Vienna, Austria | 6th | 14.00 m |
| 2003 | Universiade | Daegu, South Korea | 8th | 13.12 m |
Representing Slovenia
| 2006 | World Athletics Final | Stuttgart, Germany | 5th | 14.32 m |
| 2007 | World Championships | Osaka, Japan | 3rd | 14.72 m |
| 2008 | World Indoor Championships | Valencia, Spain | 2nd | 14.68 m |
| 2008 | Olympic Games | Beijing, China | 4th | 15.03 m (NR) |
| 2009 | European Indoor Championships | Turin, Italy | 2nd | 14.60 m |
| 2009 | World Championships | Berlin, Germany | 25th (q) | 13.69 m |
| 2011 | World Championships | Daegu, South Korea | 21st (q) | 13.87 m |
| 2012 | World Indoor Championships | Istanbul, Turkey | 9th (q) | 14.05 m |
| 2012 | Olympic Games | London, United Kingdom | 11th | 13.98 m |
