= Svitlana Mamyeyeva =

Ukrainian triple jumper (born 1982)

Svitlana Mamyeyeva (Ukrainian: Світлана Мамєєва; born 19 April 1982) is a Ukrainian triple jumper.

She competed at the 2008 Summer Olympics without reaching the final.

Her personal best jump is 14.26 metres, achieved in July 2008 in Kyiv.
