= Anastasiya Juravleva =

Uzbekistani triple jumper and long jumper (born 1981)

Medal record

Women's athletics

Representing Uzbekistan

Asian Championships
Gold medal – first place	2003 Manila	Long jump
Silver medal – second place	2003 Manila	Triple jump
Silver medal – second place	2005 Incheon	Triple jump

Asian Indoor Championships
Gold medal – first place	2014 Hangzhou	Triple jump

Anastasiya Juravleva (also spelled Zhuravlyeva, née Kirbyateva, born 9 October 1981 in Tashkent) is an Uzbekistani triple jumper and long jumper.

== Competition record ==
Year	Competition	Venue	Position	Event	Notes
Representing Uzbekistan
1999	Asian Junior Championships	Singapore	4th	Triple jump	12.71 m
2000	World Junior Championships	Santiago, Chile	24th (q)	Long jump	5.52 m (wind: +0.3 m/s)
2000	World Junior Championships	Santiago, Chile	24th (q)	Triple jump	11.96 m (wind: +2.0 m/s)
2003	Central Asian Games	Dushanbe, Tajikistan	1st	Long jump	6.28 m
2003	Central Asian Games	Dushanbe, Tajikistan	1st	Triple jump	13.55 m
2003	World Championships	Paris, France	16th (h)	4×100 relay	45.74
2003	World Championships	Paris, France	–	Triple jump	NM
2003	Asian Championships	Manila, Philippines	1st	Long jump	6.53 m
2003	Asian Championships	Manila, Philippines	2nd	Triple jump	14.21 m
2004	World Indoor Championships	Moscow, Russia	20th (q)	Triple jump	13.92 m (iNR)
2004	Olympic Games	Athens, Greece	27th (q)	Long jump	6.39 m
2004	Olympic Games	Athens, Greece	27th (q)	Triple jump	13.64 m
2005	World Championships	Helsinki, Finland	15th (q)	Triple jump	13.97 m
2005	Asian Championships	Incheon, South Korea	7th	Long jump	6.38 m
2005	Asian Championships	Incheon, South Korea	2nd	Triple jump	14.14 m
2006	World Indoor Championships	Moscow, Russia	17th (q)	Triple jump	13.58 m
2006	World Cup	Athens, Greece	5th	Triple jump	14.54 m
2006	Asian Games	Doha, Qatar	2nd	Triple jump	14.26 m
2007	World Championships	Osaka, Japan	27th (q)	Triple jump	13.31 m
2008	Olympic Games	Beijing, China	29th (q)	Triple jump	13.36 m
2010	Asian Games	Guangzhou, China	6th	Triple jump	13.38 m
2011	Asian Championships	Kobe, Japan	5th	Triple jump	13.88 m
2011	World Championships	Daegu, South Korea	18th (q)	Triple jump	14.00 m
2012	Olympic Games	London, United Kingdom	29th (q)	Triple jump	13.54 m
2013	Asian Championships	Pune, India	2nd	Long jump	6.36 m
2013	Asian Championships	Pune, India	1st	Triple jump	14.18 m
2013	World Championships	Moscow, Russia	19th (q)	Triple jump	13.32 m
2014	Asian Indoor Championships	Hangzhou, China	5th	Long jump	6.15 m
2014	Asian Indoor Championships	Hangzhou, China	1st	Triple jump	13.60 m
2014	Asian Games	Incheon, South Korea	7th	Triple jump	13.64 m
2015	Asian Championships	Wuhan, China	12th	Long jump	5.92 m

=== Personal bests ===
- Long jump – 6.69 m (2003)
- Triple jump – 14.55 m (2005) – current national record.
