= Martina Šestáková =

Czech triple jumper (born 1978)

Personal information
- Full name: Martina Šestáková, née Darmovzalová
- Nationality: Czech Republic
- Born: 12 October 1978 (age 47) Valtice, Czechoslovakia
- Height: 1.72 m (5 ft 7 1/2 in)
- Weight: 58 kg (128 lb)

Sport
- Sport: Athletics
- Event: Triple jump
- Club: TJ Lokomotiva Břeclav
- Coached by: Michal Pogány

Achievements and titles
- Personal best: Triple jump: 14.18 m (2009)

Martina Šestáková (née Darmovzalová) (born 12 October 1978 in Valtice) is a Czech triple jumper. She set a personal best jump of 14.18 metres at a national athletics meet in Kladno. She is also a seven-time national triple jump champion (2002–2008), and a member of TJ Lokomotiva Břeclav, under her personal coach Michal Pogány.

Šestáková represented the Czech Republic at the 2008 Summer Olympics in Beijing, where she competed for the women's triple jump. Unfortunately, she did not receive her best mark in the qualifying rounds, after failing to jump at a specific distance in three successive attempts.
