= Shani Marks =

American triple jumper

Personal information
- Born: August 24, 1980 (age 45) Bloomington, Minnesota, United States

Sport
- Sport: Track and field

Shani Marks (Johnson) (born August 24, 1980) is an American athlete who competes in the triple jump. Marks finished first at the U.S. Olympic Trials to qualify for the 2008 Summer Olympics.

Marks was a state champion at Apple Valley High School and graduated in 1998.

Marks was the USA Indoor Champion in the triple jump in 2005 and 2007 and the USA Outdoor Champion in 2006 and 2007. She finished seventh at the 2006 World Cup, and also competed at the 2007 World Championships and the 2008 World Indoor Championships without reaching the final.

Her personal best distance is 14.38 metres, achieved at the 2008 Olympic Trials. At the Olympics, she ranked 13th in the qualifying round with a jump of 13.44 m.
