= Hrysopiyi Devetzi =

Greek athlete

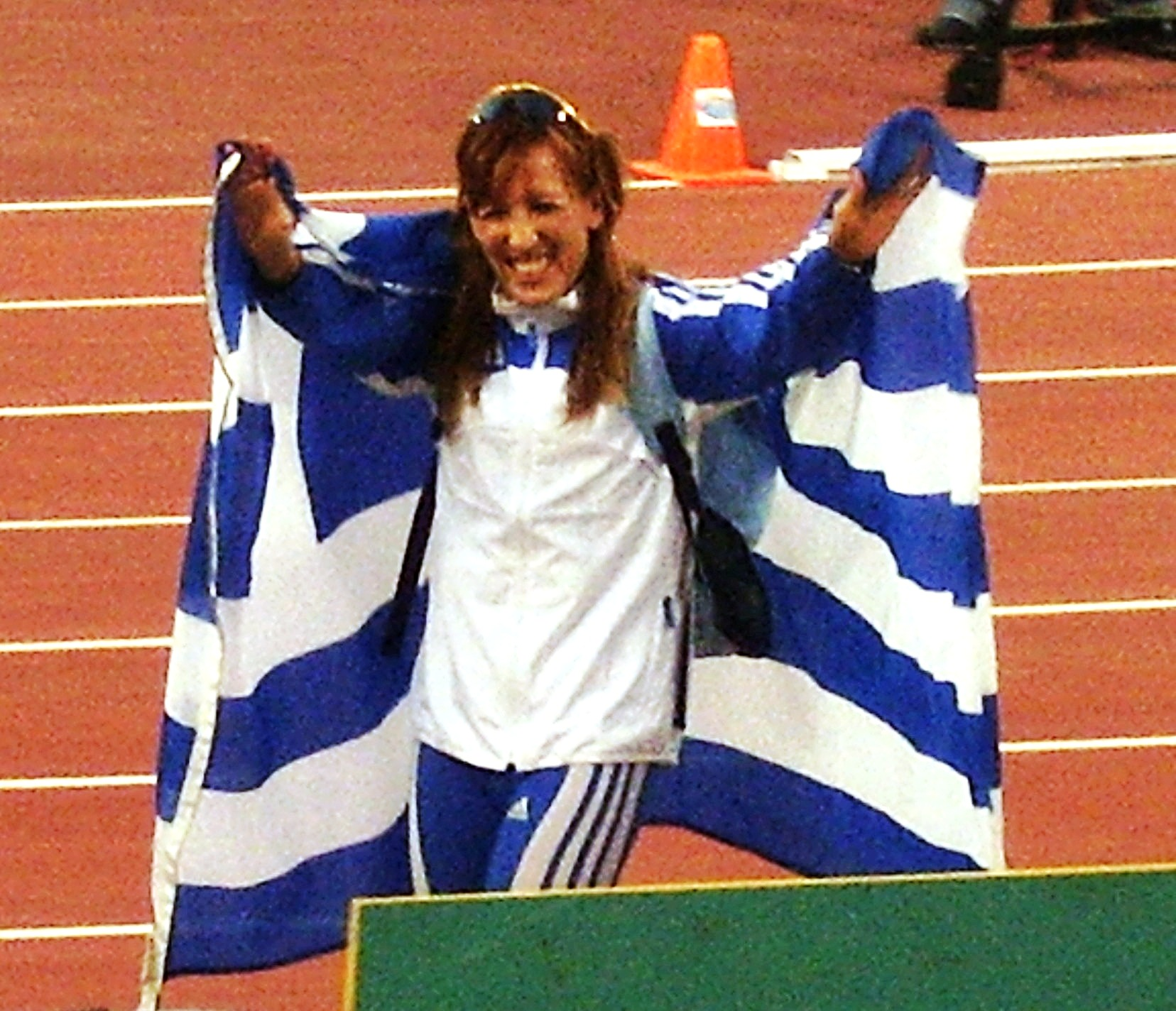
- Devetzi in 2006

Personal information
- Born: 2 January 1976 (age 50)

Sport
- Country: Greece
- Sport: Athletics
- Event: Triple jump

Achievements and titles
- Personal bests: 15.32 m, 14.84 m (i)
Medal record
Olympic Games
Silver medal – second place	2004 Athens	Triple jump
Disqualified	2008 Beijing	Triple jump
World Championships
Disqualified	2007 Osaka	Triple jump
World Indoor Championships
Disqualified	2008 Valencia	Triple jump
Bronze medal – third place	2004 Budapest	Triple jump
European Championships
Silver medal – second place	2006 Göteborg	Triple jump
World Cup
Silver medal – second place	2006 Athens	Triple jump
Bronze medal – third place	2006 Athens	Long jump
Mediterranean Games
Bronze medal – third place	2005 Almeria	Triple jump

Hrysopiyi "Piyi" Devetzi (Greek: Χρυσοπηγή Δεβετζή, [xrisopiˈʝi ðeveˈdzi], born January 2, 1976) is a retired Greek athlete who competed in the triple jump and long jump.

Devetzi was born in Alexandroupoli. She won the triple jump silver medal at the 2004 Summer Olympics with 15.25 and the triple jump bronze medal at the 2008 Summer Olympics with 15.23. At the 2004 Summer Olympics semifinal she set a Greek record of 15.32 metres. This performance ranked her in the fourth place of all time triple jumpers, after the world record holder, Inessa Kravets, her greatest rival Tatyana Lebedeva and the twice-olympic gold medalist Françoise Mbango Etone. She won another silver medal at the 2006 European Athletics Championships in Gothenburg, losing the gold at the last jump by Tatyana Lebedeva. The same story was repeated at the 2008 IAAF World Indoor Championships in Valencia, in which "Piyi" lost the 1st place at the sixth jump by Yargelis Savigne.

Devetzi was known for often jumping longer in qualification rounds than in finals, as at the 2004 Olympics, and also for her lack of gold at major championships, despite having been one of the world's leading female triple jumpers.

She was named the Greek Female Athlete of the Year for the years 2005, 2006, 2007 and 2008.

== Doping ban ==
In May 2009 Devetzi refused to submit to doping control. Failing to submit sample equals a positive test, and she was subsequently handed a two-year doping ban.

In 2016, samples given by Devetzi in August 2007 were retested revealing stanozolol. Her subsequent results (for the next four years), covering the time until her retirement, were annulled, including the 2008 Olympic bronze medal. Her 2007 World Championship bronze medal was also annulled.

On 17 November 2016 the IOC disqualified Devetzi from the 2008 Olympic Games, stripped her Olympic bronze medal and struck her long jump and triple jump results from the record for failing a drugs test in a re-analysis of her doping sample from 2008.

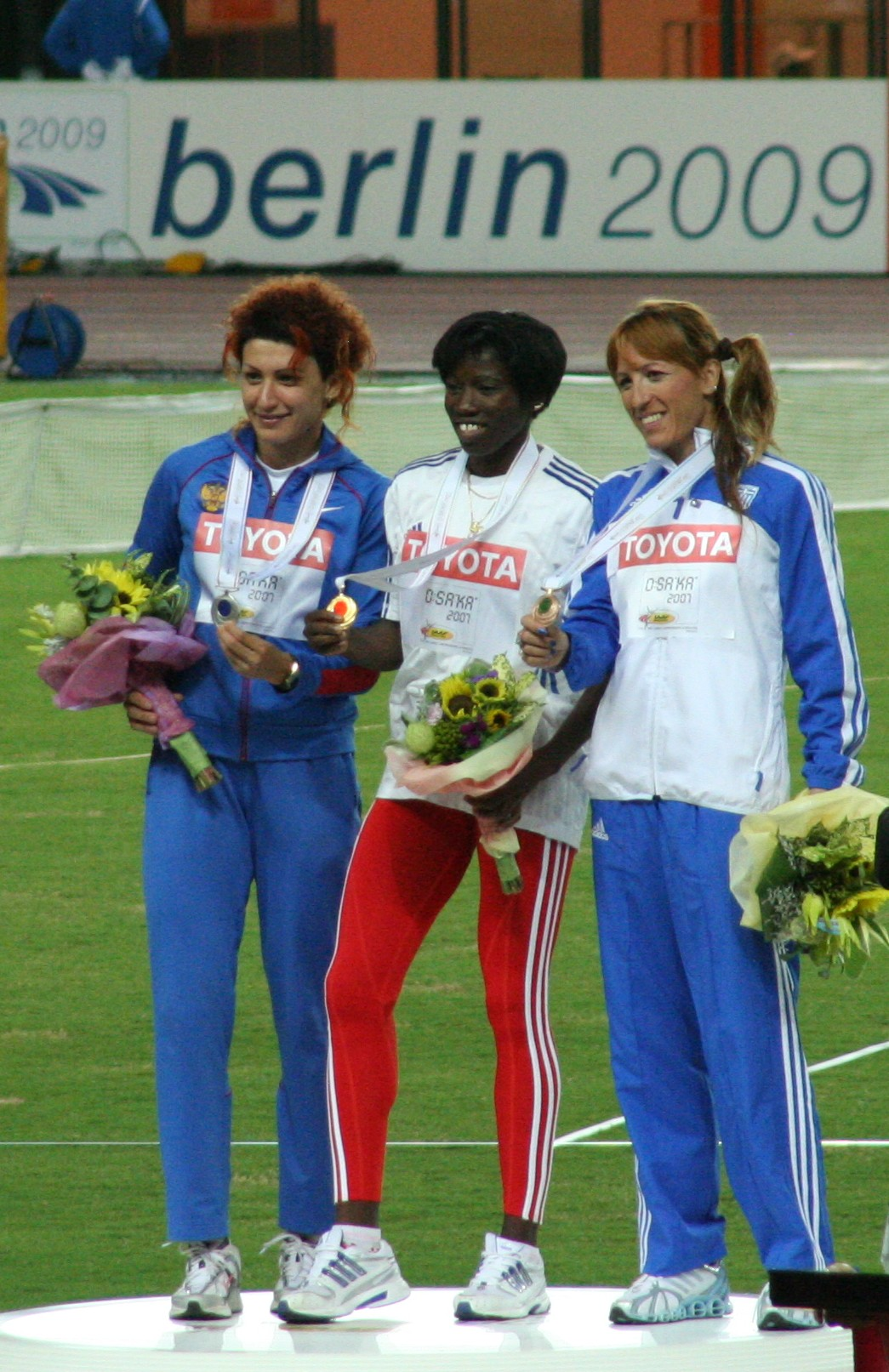
Piyi Devetzi initially third in Osaka, 2007

== Personal bests ==
Date	Event	Venue	Performance
August 21, 2004	Triple jump	Athens, Greece	15.32 m NR
March 4, 2003	Triple jump (indoor)	Peania, Greece	14.84 m NR
June 10, 2006	Long jump	Trikala, Greece	6.83 m *
March 3, 2006	Long jump (indoor)	Liévin, France	6.31 m

- (*) Third among Greek long jumpers, behind Niki Xanthou (7.03) and Paraskevi Tsiamita (6.93).

== Achievements ==
Year	Competition	Venue	Position	Event	Notes
2001	Mediterranean Games	Tunis, Tunisia	5th	Triple jump	
2002	European Championships	Munich, Germany	7th	Triple jump	14.15 m
2003	World Championships	Paris, France	8th	Triple jump	14.34 m =PB
2004	World Indoor Championships	Budapest, Hungary	3rd	Triple jump	14.73 m
2004	Olympic Games	Athens, Greece	2nd	Triple jump	15.25 m
2004	World Athletics Final	Monte Carlo, Monaco	4th	Triple jump	
2005	European Indoor Championships	Madrid, Spain	10th (q)	Triple jump	
2005	Mediterranean Games	Almeria, Spain	3rd	Triple jump	14.33 m
2005	World Championships	Helsinki, Finland	5th	Triple jump	14.64 m
2005	World Athletics Final	Monte Carlo, Monaco	1st	Triple jump	14.89 m SB
2006	European Championships	Gothenburg, Sweden	2nd	Triple jump	15.05 m SB
2006	European Championships	Gothenburg, Sweden	10th	Long jump	6.41 m
2006	World Athletics Final	Stuttgart, Germany	2nd	Triple jump	14.67 m
2006	World Cup	Athens, Greece	2nd	Triple jump	15.04 m
2006	World Cup	Athens, Greece	3rd	Long jump	6.64 m
2007	World Championships	Osaka, Japan	~~3rd~~ DSQ	Triple jump	~~15.04 m~~ DSQ
2007	World Athletics Final	Stuttgart, Germany	~~2nd~~	Triple jump	~~14.75 m~~
2007	Military World Games	Hyderabad, India	~~1st~~	Long jump	~~6.69 m~~
2008	World Indoor Championships	Valencia, Spain	~~2nd~~	Triple jump	~~15.00 m NR~~
2008	Olympic Games	Beijing, China	~~3rd~~ DSQ	Triple jump	~~15.23 m SB~~ DSQ
2008	Olympic Games	Beijing, China	~~14th~~ DSQ	Long jump	~~6.57 m~~ DSQ

== Personal best progression ==
(Records in bold are current ones.)

Event	Performance	Venue	Date
Triple Jump	13.44 m	Rethymno, Greece	1998, May 30
Triple Jump	13.61 m	Chania, Greece	1999, July 28
Triple Jump	14.00 m	Kalamata, Greece	2001, June 2
Triple Jump	14.15 m	Rethymno, Greece	2002, July 7
Triple Jump	14.15 m	Munich, Germany	2002, August 10
Triple Jump (Indoor)	14.48 m	Peania, Greece	2003, February 16
**Triple Jump (Indoor)**	**14.84 m (NR)**	**Peania, Greece**	**2003, March 4**
Triple Jump	14.25 m	Trikala, Greece	2003, June 24
Triple Jump	14.34 m	Paris, France	2003, August 24
Triple Jump	14.34 m	Paris, France	2003, August 26
Triple Jump	14.38 m	Athens, Greece	2004, June 12
Triple Jump	14.48 m	Athens, Greece	2004, June 12
Triple Jump	14.65 m	Bydgoszcz, Poland	2004, June 19
**Triple Jump**	**15.32 m (NR)**	**Athens, Greece**	**2004, August 21**
Triple Jump (Indoor)	~~14.89 m (NR)~~ Annulled	Peania, Greece	2008, February 13
Triple Jump (Indoor)	~~14.93 m (NR)~~ Annulled	Valencia, Spain	2008, March 8
Triple Jump (Indoor)	~~15.00 m (NR)~~ Annulled	Valencia, Spain	2008, March 8
Long Jump	6.15 m	Athens, Greece	1999, June 24
Long Jump	6.19 m	Athens, Greece	2000, June 1
Long Jump	6.36 m	Athens, Greece	2003, May 4
Long Jump	6.56 m	Athens, Greece	2005, June 11
Long Jump	6.60 m	Deskati, Greece	2006, May 13
**Long Jump**	**6.83 m**	**Trikala, Greece**	**2006, June 10**
**Long Jump (Indoor)**	**6.31 m**	**Lievin, France**	**2006, March 3**
Long Jump (Indoor)	~~6.85 m~~ Annulled	Peania, Greece	2008, February 9
