= Athletics at the 2006 Asian Games – Women's long jump =

Women's long jump at the 2006 Asian Games
- Venue: Khalifa International Stadium
- Dates: 10 December 2006
- Competitors: 15 from 11 nations

Medalists
gold medal	Kumiko Ikeda	Japan
silver medal	Anju Bobby George	India
bronze medal	Olga Rypakova	Kazakhstan

The women's long jump competition at the 2006 Asian Games in Doha, Qatar was held on 10 December 2006 at the Khalifa International Stadium.

== Schedule ==
All times are Arabia Standard Time (UTC+03:00)

Date	Time	Event
Sunday, 10 December 2006	17:40	Final

== Records ==
Prior to this competition, the existing world, Asian and Games records were as follows.

World Record	Galina Chistyakova (URS)	7.52	Leningrad, Soviet Union	11 June 1988
Asian Record	Yao Weili (CHN)	7.01	Jinan, China	5 June 1993
Games Record	Yao Weili (CHN)	6.91	Hiroshima, Japan	15 October 1994

== Results ==
Legend

- NM — No mark

Rank	Athlete	Attempt						Result	Notes
Rank	Athlete	1	2	3	4	5	6	Result	Notes
1st place, gold medalist(s)	Kumiko Ikeda (JPN)	6.38 +0.3	6.68; 0.0	6.58 +0.1	X	6.81 +0.3	6.63; 0.0	6.81	
2nd place, silver medalist(s)	Anju Bobby George (IND)	6.36 +0.1	6.46 +0.2	X	X	6.47 +0.1	6.52 +0.1	6.52	
3rd place, bronze medalist(s)	Olga Rypakova (KAZ)	X	6.40 +0.1	X	6.49 +0.1	X	6.09; 0.0	6.49	
4	Chen Yaling (CHN)	6.35 +0.1	6.36; 0.0	6.32 +0.1	X	X	6.38 +0.2	6.38	
5	Jung Soon-ok (KOR)	6.17 +0.1	X	6.22 +0.2	6.26 +0.3	6.23 +0.2	6.26 −0.1	6.26	
6	Marestella Torres (PHI)	X	5.88 +0.2	X	6.25 +0.2	X	X	6.25	
7	Maho Hanaoka (JPN)	6.22 +0.3	X	X	X	6.24 +0.4	5.96 +0.1	6.24	
8	J. J. Shobha (IND)	6.00; 0.0	6.13 +0.4	X	X	3.64 +0.4	—	6.13	
9	Kim Su-yeon (KOR)	X	X	5.83; 0.0				5.83	
10	Rima Taha (JOR)	X	X	5.79 +0.2				5.79	
11	Chamali Priyadharshani (SRI)	5.43 +0.1	5.70 +0.1	5.75; 0.0				5.75	
12	Lerma Gabito (PHI)	X	5.71 +0.2	X				5.71	
13	Foujia Huda (BAN)	X	5.67 +0.4	5.68 +0.2				5.68	
14	Rahima Sardi (KGZ)	X	5.35 +0.2	5.65 −0.1				5.65	
—	Mona Al-Mubarak (KUW)	X	X	X				NM	
