= Athletics at the 2014 Asian Games – Women's long jump =

Women's long jump at the 2014 Asian Games
- Venue: Incheon Asiad Main Stadium
- Dates: 29 September 2014
- Competitors: 13 from 9 nations

Medalists
gold medal	Maria Natalia Londa	Indonesia
silver medal	Bùi Thị Thu Thảo	Vietnam
bronze medal	Jiang Yanfei	China

The Women's Long jump event at the 2014 Asian Games was held at the Incheon Stadium, Incheon, South Korea on 29 September.

== Schedule ==
All times are Korea Standard Time (UTC+09:00)

Date	Time	Event
Tuesday, 29 September 2014	19:00	Final

== Records ==
Prior to this competition, the existing world, Asian and Games records were as follows.

World Record	Galina Chistyakova (URS)	7.52	Leningrad, Soviet Union	11 June 1988
Asian Record	Yao Weili (CHN)	7.01	Jinan, China	5 June 1993
Games Record	Yao Weili (CHN)	6.91	Hiroshima, Japan	15 October 1994

== Results ==
Legend

- DNS — Did not start
- NM — No mark

Rank	Athlete	Attempt						Result	Notes
Rank	Athlete	1	2	3	4	5	6	Result	Notes
1st place, gold medalist(s)	Maria Natalia Londa (INA)	X +0.8	6.19 +0.3	X +0.9	6.40 +0.9	X +0.4	6.55 +0.3	6.55	
2nd place, silver medalist(s)	Bùi Thị Thu Thảo (VIE)	6.35 −0.1	X −0.3	6.44 +0.9	6.31 +0.3	6.30 +0.4	6.33 −0.3	6.44	
3rd place, bronze medalist(s)	Jiang Yanfei (CHN)	X −0.6	6.24 +0.3	6.34 +0.3	6.24 +0.4	6.19 +0.3	6.29 −0.2	6.34	
4	Jung Soon-ok (KOR)	X −0.5	X +0.3	6.26 +1.0	6.34 +0.6	6.20 +0.3	6.12 −0.5	6.34	
5	Bae Chan-mi (KOR)	5.67 +0.7	6.34 +0.4	6.14 +0.7	X +0.5	X +0.2	5.89 −0.3	6.34	
6	Lu Minjia (CHN)	6.24 +0.3	6.22 +0.3	6.28 +0.8	6.21 +0.3	6.22 +0.4	6.03 −0.2	6.28	
7	Darya Reznichenko (UZB)	6.25 +0.2	6.04 −0.5	6.01 +0.7	6.11 +0.5	6.05 +0.4	6.10 +0.1	6.25	
8	M. A. Prajusha (IND)	6.23; 0.0	X +0.2	X +0.3	6.17 +0.7	X +0.3	X 0.0	6.23	
9	Mayookha Johny (IND)	6.04 +0.3	6.12 −0.3	6.02 +0.5				6.12	
10	Keshari Chaudhari (NEP)	4.71 +0.3	4.76 −0.5	X +0.5				4.76	
11	Bashair Al-Manwari (QAT)	4.07 +0.6	X +0.2	4.34 +0.6				4.34	
—	Marestella Torres (PHI)	X +0.1	X −0.1	X +0.8				NM	
—	Yuliya Tarasova (UZB)							DNS	
