= Athletics at the 2010 Asian Games – Women's long jump =

Women's long jump at the 2010 Asian Games
- Venue: Aoti Main Stadium
- Date: 23 November 2010
- Competitors: 14 from 9 nations

Medalists
gold medal	Jung Soon-ok	South Korea
silver medal	Olga Rypakova	Kazakhstan
bronze medal	Yuliya Tarasova	Uzbekistan

The women's long jump event at the 2010 Asian Games was held at the Aoti Main Stadium, Guangzhou, China on 23 November.

== Schedule ==
All times are China Standard Time (UTC+08:00)

Date	Time	Event
Tuesday, 23 November 2010	17:10	Final

== Records ==
Prior to this competition, the existing world, Asian and Games records were as follows.

World Record	Galina Chistyakova (URS)	7.52	Leningrad, Soviet Union	11 June 1988
Asian Record	Yao Weili (CHN)	7.01	Jinan, China	5 June 1993
Games Record	Yao Weili (CHN)	6.91	Hiroshima, Japan	15 October 1994

== Results ==
Rank	Athlete	Attempt						Result	Notes
Rank	Athlete	1	2	3	4	5	6	Result	Notes
1st place, gold medalist(s)	Jung Soon-ok (KOR)	6.34 +0.5	X 0.0	6.22 −0.9	6.53 −0.9	6.43 −0.7	—	6.53	
2nd place, silver medalist(s)	Olga Rypakova (KAZ)	6.31 +0.4	X −0.4	6.50 −0.4	6.44 −0.8	X −0.8	X −0.2	6.50	
3rd place, bronze medalist(s)	Yuliya Tarasova (UZB)	X +0.2	6.42 +0.4	6.11 −0.3	6.49 −0.7	6.37 −0.7	6.31 −0.1	6.49	
4	Marestella Torres (PHI)	6.49 +1.1	X −0.3	X −0.5	X −0.9	X −0.4	X −0.4	6.49	
5	Kumiko Imura (JPN)	6.37 +0.7	6.19; 0.0	6.37 −0.4	6.28 −0.7	6.29 −0.8	6.30 −0.4	6.37	
6	Lu Minjia (CHN)	6.36 +0.4	6.36 +1.0	6.14 −0.2	6.13 −0.9	6.21 −0.9	X −0.8	6.36	
7	Mayookha Johny (IND)	6.33 +0.9	6.25 +0.2	6.23 −0.4	X −0.4	X −0.5	X −0.6	6.33	
8	Sachiko Masumi (JPN)	6.11 +0.5	X +0.4	6.06 −0.6	X −0.6	X −0.7	6.03 −0.6	6.11	
9	M. A. Prajusha (IND)	6.11 +0.8	X +0.2	6.05 −0.5				6.11	
10	Chen Yaling (CHN)	6.10 +1.0	5.90 +0.3	6.09 −0.7				6.10	
11	Aleksandra Kotlyarova (UZB)	5.84 +0.2	6.00 +0.3	4.04 −0.8				6.00	
12	Chamali Priyadharshani (SRI)	5.77 +0.5	5.90 +0.8	5.92 −0.3				5.92	
13	Sirada Seechaichana (THA)	X +0.7	5.75; 0.0	5.84 −0.9				5.84	
14	Tatyana Konichsheva (KAZ)	5.53 +0.7	X +0.6	5.30 −0.2				5.53	
