= 2015 Asian Athletics Championships – Women's long jump =

The women's long jump event at the 2015 Asian Athletics Championships was held on June 3.

== Results ==
Rank	Name	Nationality	#1	#2	#3	#4	#5	#6	Result	Notes
1st place, gold medalist(s)	Lu Minjia	China	6.41	6.52	x	x	x	x	6.52	
2nd place, silver medalist(s)	Jung Soon-ok	South Korea	6.18	6.32	6.44	x	6.33	6.47	6.47	
3rd place, bronze medalist(s)	Xu Xiaoling	China	6.26	x	x	6.42	6.46	x	6.46	
4	Zhou Xiaoxue	China	6.25	6.40	x	x	6.20	6.23	6.40	
5	Noor Amira Mohamad Nafiah	Malaysia	5.97	x	6.14	x	x	6.29	6.29	
6	Mayookha Johny	India	6.10	6.03	6.17	6.24	x	6.21	6.24	
7	Anna Bulanova	Kyrgyzstan	6.10	6.02	5.87	5.89	5.96	x	6.10	
8	Konomi Kai	Japan	6.06	6.05	x	–	–	–	6.06	
9	Darya Reznichenko	Uzbekistan	6.02	5.97	5.76				6.02	
10	Bae Chan-mi	South Korea	6.01	x	x				6.01	
11	Yurina Hiraka	Japan	5.94	x	5.86				5.94	
12	Anastasiya Juravleva	Uzbekistan	5.92	x	x				5.92	
13	Fitriaindah Wahuni	Indonesia	x	5.80	x				5.80	
14	Chan Ka Sin	Hong Kong	x	5.32	x				5.32	
	Maryam Babar	Pakistan	x	x	x				NM	
