= Athletics at the 2002 Asian Games – Women's long jump =

Women's long jump at the 2002 Asian Games
- Venue: Busan Asiad Main Stadium
- Date: 7 October 2002
- Competitors: 12 from 8 nations

Medalists
gold medal	Anju Bobby George	India
silver medal	Maho Hanaoka	Japan
bronze medal	Yelena Koshcheyeva	Kazakhstan

The women's long jump competition at the 2002 Asian Games in Busan, South Korea was held on 7 October at the Busan Asiad Main Stadium.

== Schedule ==
All times are Korea Standard Time (UTC+09:00)

Date	Time	Event
Monday, 7 October 2002	15:30	Final

== Records ==
Prior to this competition, the existing world, Asian and Games records were as follows.

World Record	Galina Chistyakova (URS)	7.52	Leningrad, Soviet Union	11 June 1988
Asian Record	Yao Weili (CHN)	7.01	Jinan, China	5 June 1993
Games Record	Yao Weili (CHN)	6.91	Hiroshima, Japan	15 October 1994

== Results ==
Rank	Athlete	Attempt						Result	Notes
Rank	Athlete	1	2	3	4	5	6	Result	Notes
1st place, gold medalist(s)	Anju Bobby George (IND)	6.45; 0.0	6.41 +0.2	X	X	6.53 −1.8	X	6.53	
2nd place, silver medalist(s)	Maho Hanaoka (JPN)	6.40 +0.7	6.38 −0.8	6.42 +0.3	6.19 −0.3	6.39 −1.4	6.47 +0.7	6.47	
3rd place, bronze medalist(s)	Yelena Koshcheyeva (KAZ)	6.09 +0.7	X	6.30 +0.1	6.15 −0.9	6.30 −0.4	X	6.30	
4	Lerma Gabito (PHI)	6.23 +2.6	6.30; 0.0	5.95 −0.9	6.05 −0.6	6.25 −0.1	6.22 +0.6	6.30	
5	Jin Yan (CHN)	6.08 +0.9	5.96 −0.8	6.03 −0.4	5.95 +0.4	6.25; 0.0	X	6.25	
6	Marestella Torres (PHI)	5.98 −0.4	6.06 −0.3	X	6.08 −0.5	X	5.94 +0.3	6.08	
7	Kumiko Ikeda (JPN)	X	5.77 +0.3	5.93 +0.1	X	5.80 −0.2	6.04 +0.3	6.04	
8	Mariya Sokova (UZB)	5.96 +0.5	6.01 +0.9	5.87 −1.1	X	X	X	6.01	
9	Gu Ying (CHN)	5.93 −0.1	5.17 +0.9	5.70 −0.9				5.93	
10	Nguyễn Bích Vân (VIE)	5.85 +1.2	5.74 +0.2	X				5.85	
11	Kim Su-yeon (KOR)	X	5.80 +0.5	5.68 +1.2				5.80	
12	Phan Thị Thu Lan (VIE)	5.72 −0.7	5.67; 0.0	5.59 −0.4				5.72	
