= 2011 Asian Athletics Championships – Women's long jump =

The Women's Long jump of the 2011 Asian Athletics Championships was held on 7 July 2011 in the Kobe Universiade Memorial Stadium of Kobe, Japan. In the women's long jump event, 14 athletes from the seven nations and one Chinese SAR (Hong Kong) participated. The gold medal was won by the Indian athlete Mayookha Johny with a best jump of 6.56 meters. Yuliya Tarasova of Uzbekistan, the current Asian leader of the event with a jump of 6.68 meters, failed to win a medal and finished fourth with a best jump of 6.37 meters. Another favorite, South Korean Jung Soon-Ok—with a personal best of 6.76 meters—also failed to finish on the podium. Her best jump of 6.12 meters was not even good enough for her to reach the last eight in the competition.

== Medalists ==
Gold	Mayookha Johny; India
Silver	Lu Minjia; China
Bronze	Saeko Okayama; Japan

== Records ==
Prior to the competition, the following records were as follows.

World record	Galina Chistyakova (URS)	7.52	Leningrad, Soviet Union	11 June 1988
Asian Record	Yao Weili (CHN)	7.01	Jinan, China	5 June 1993
Championship record	Guan Yingnan (CHN)	6.83	Fukuoka, Japan	July 1998
Asian leading	Yuliya Tarasova (UZB)	6.68	Tashkent, Uzbekistan	12 June 2011

No new records was set during this competition.

== Schedule ==
Date	Time	Round
7 July 2011	18:01 (JST)	Final

== Results ==
In the event, 14 athletes participated. The event held in two elimination rounds, in the first round all athletes were given three attempts to qualify for the next stage. On the basis of initial three attempts, top eight athletes qualified for the final round. Contingents were given another three chances, and on the basis of total six attempts made by athletes, top three placeholders were selected.

=== Final ===
The gold medal of the event was won by the Indian long jumper Mayookha Johny, with a best jump of 6.56 meters. Mayookha became only the second Indian to win gold in this event; the previous gold winner for India was Anju Bobby George, who had won gold medal in the long jump event of Asian Athletics Championships. Anju achieved first position at Incheon, South Korea in 2005, with a jump of 6.65 meters. This first position of Mayookha, helped her with an automatic qualification ('A' standard )—as the continental champion—for the World Championships, scheduled to take place on 27 August 2011 in Daegu, South Korea. The silver medal of the event was won by the Chinese athlete Lu Minjia, with a best jump of 6.52 meters. Japanese Saeko Okayama, without making a single fault throughout the event, won a bronze medal, with a best performance of 6.51 meters.

Rank	Athlete	Nationality	No.1	No.2	No.3	No.4	No.5	No.6	Result
1st place, gold medalist(s)	Mayookha Johny	India	6.34	6.56	×	×	6.52	6.50	6.56
2nd place, silver medalist(s)	Lu Minjia	China	6.05	6.52	×	×	×	×	6.52
3rd place, bronze medalist(s)	Saeko Okayama	Japan	6.30	6.43	6.37	6.18	6.22	6.51	6.51
4	Yuliya Tarasova	Uzbekistan	3.84	6.23	6.05	×	6.37	6.18	6.37
5	Marestella Torres	Philippines	6.21	6.27	×	6.34	×	6.24	6.34
6	Prajusha Maliakhal Anthony	India	6.07	×	6.27	×	6.18	×	6.27
7	Kumiko Imura	Japan	6.12	×	6.23	6.22	6.15	6.22	6.23
8	Aleksandra Kotlyarova	Uzbekistan	6.00	6.02	6.16	6.01	×	×	6.16
9	Hanako Kotake	Japan	6.15	6.14	6.11				6.15
10	Jung Soon-Ok	South Korea	6.12	5.96	6.06				6.12
11	Wupin Wang	China	5.88	6.08	6.08				6.08
12	Lai Yee Cheung	Hong Kong	5.72	5.83	5.62				5.83
13	Yekaterina Chalikova	Turkmenistan	×	×	5.59				5.59
14	Mang Chi Tse	Hong Kong	5.18	5.16	5.11				5.18
