= 2012 Japan Championships in Athletics =

96th Japan Championships in Athletics
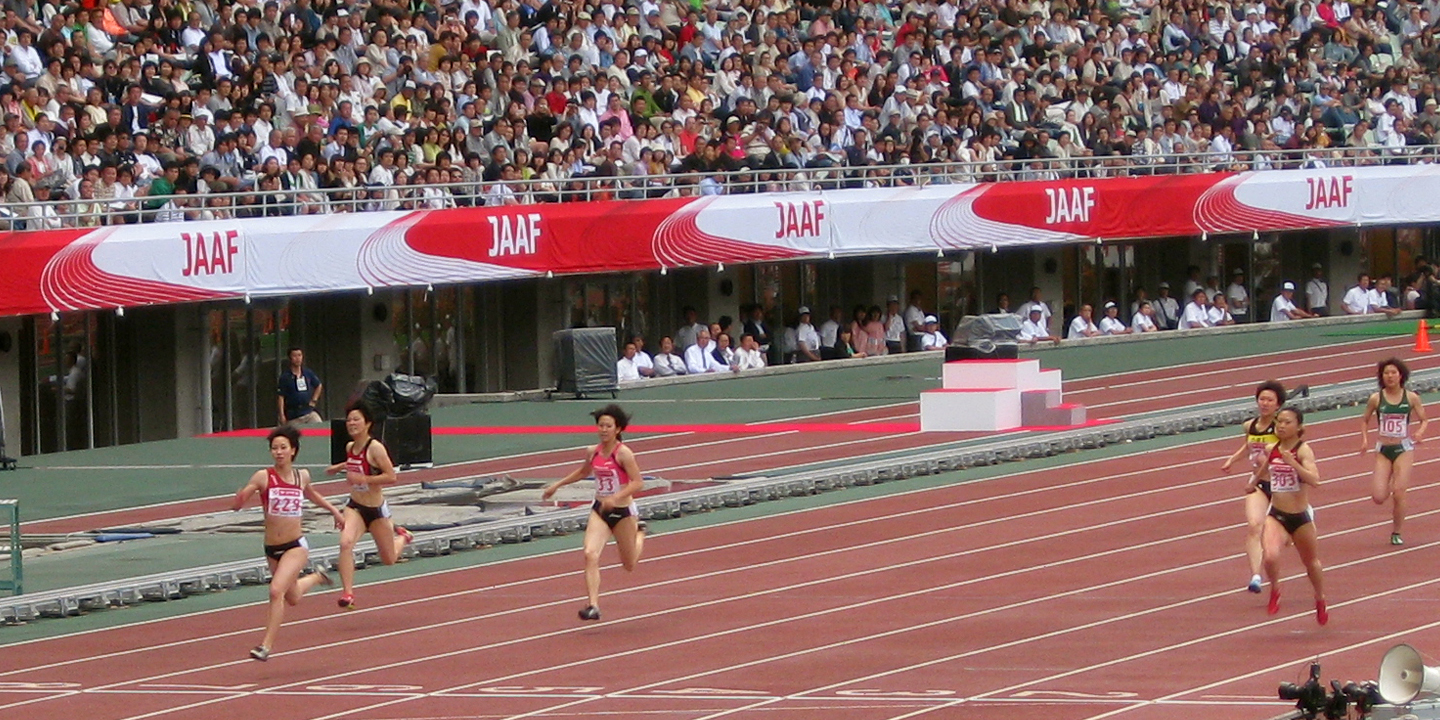
- Dates: June 8–10
- Host city: Osaka, Japan
- Venue: Nagai Stadium
- Level: Senior
- Type: Outdoor
- Events: 36 (men: 18; women: 18)
- Records set: 6 (NR: 2; CR: 4)

The 96th Japan Championships in Athletics (第96回日本陸上競技選手権大会, Dai 96 kai Nihon Rikujō Kyōgi Sensyuken Taikai) were held at Nagai Stadium in Osaka. Organised by JAAF. The three-day competition took place from June 8–10 and served as the national championships in track and field for Japan. The competition was for the qualifying trial for the Japan team at the 2012 Summer Olympics.

During the competition, 2 new national records and 4 new championship records were set in the events. Two women athletes, Tomomi Abiko set a new Japanese record in the pole vault, and Yuki Ebihara broke her own national record in the javelin. Koji Murofushi won the hummer throw's national champions for eighteen consecutive years. Yuzo Kanemaru won 400m eight years in a row. Chisato Fukushima won both the 100 m and 200m races two years in a row. For the Most Valuable Player of the Championships, Genki Dean and Yuki Ebihara were selected.

The competition was broadcast on television by NHK.

== Ground conditions ==
Date	Time	Weather	Temperature (°C)	Humidity	Wind (m/s)
8 June	15:00	Rain	23.8	87%	ESE 0.9
8 June	17:00	Rain	22.8	87%	E 0.9
8 June	19:00	Rain	22.5	87%	SSE 0.4
8 June	20:00	Rain	22.4	87%	SW 1.1
9 June	15:00	Clear	25.0	72%	ESE 1.3
9 June	17:00	Cloudy	24.8	72%	E 0.8
9 June	19:00	Cloudy	24.5	76%	SE 0.9
9 June	20:00	Cloudy	24.0	79%	ESE 0.9
10 June	12:30	Cloudy	24.5	57%	E 1.2
10 June	15:00	Cloudy	25.0	54%	E 1.4
10 June	17:00	Clear	25.2	51%	ESE 1.7
Sources : Osaka Athletics Association

== Event schedule ==
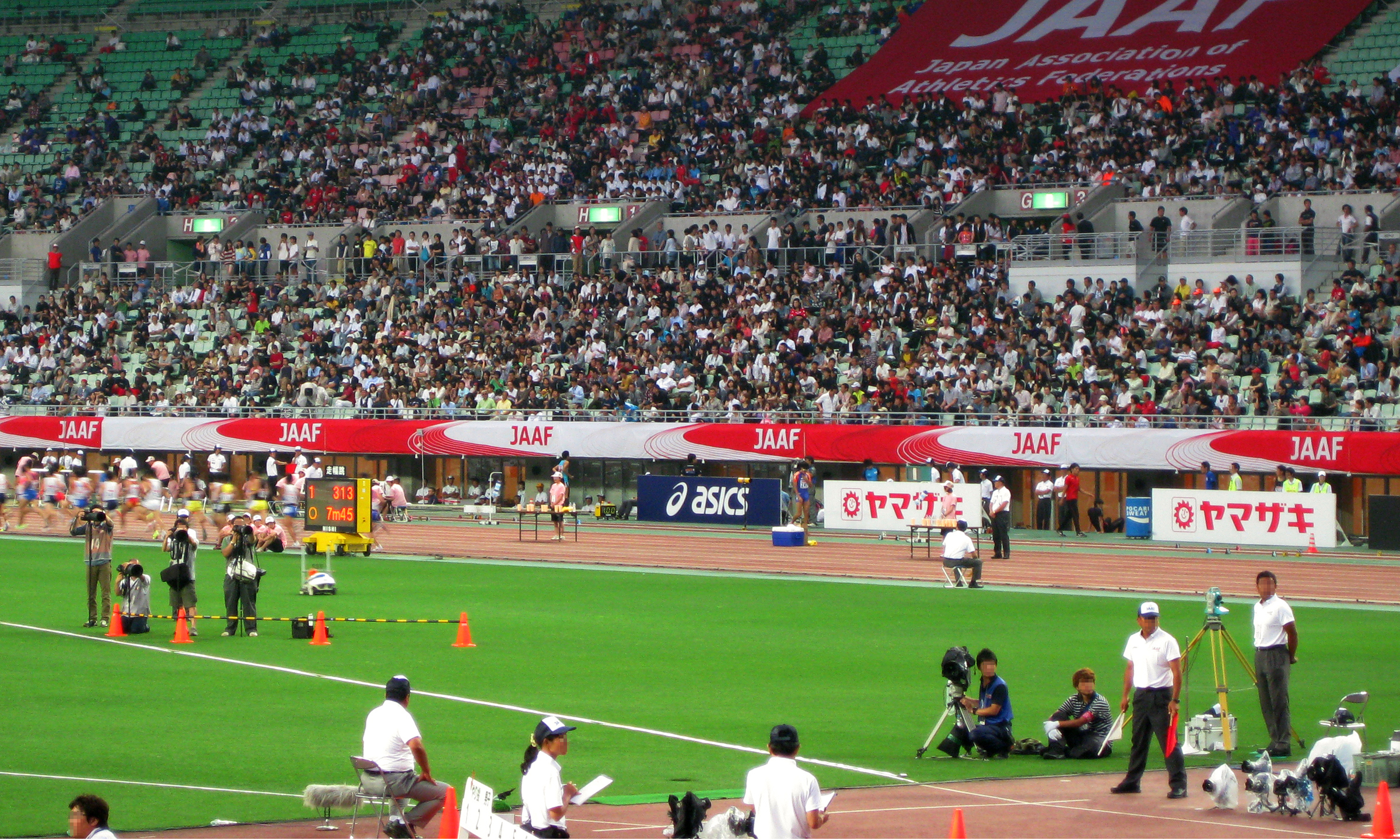
Watching the game on 9 June.

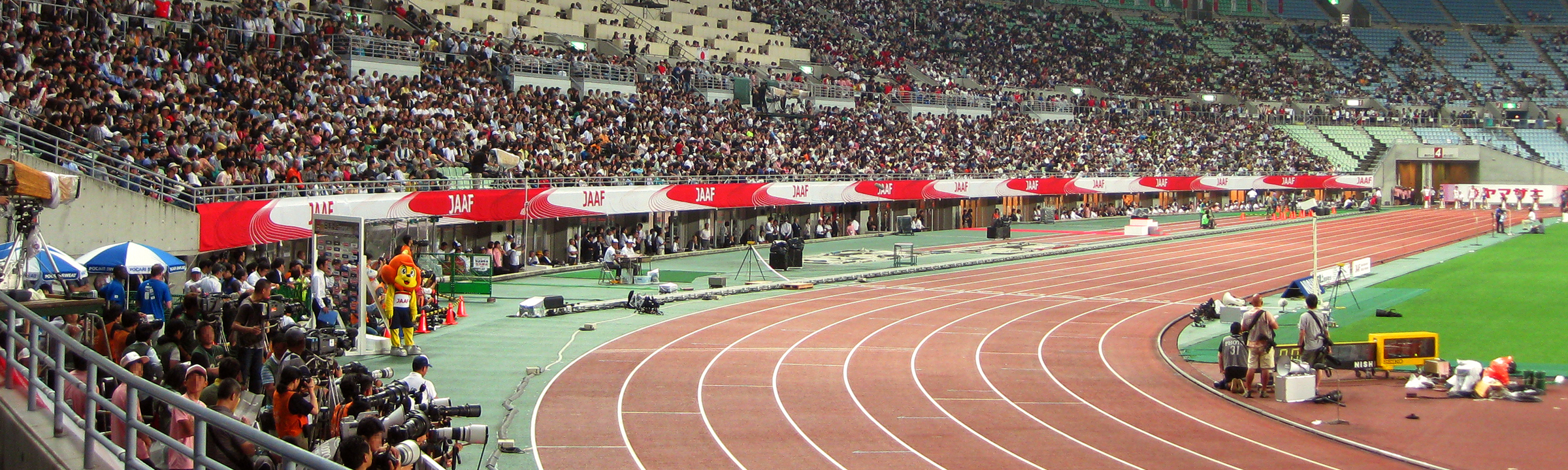
Crowds on stands waiting for start of the men's 100 metres final on 9 June.

H	Heats	½	Semifinals	F	Final

Men
Date →	Fri 8		Sat 9		Sun 10	
Event ↓	Round	Time	Round	Time	Round	Time
100 m	H	19:45	F	20:30		
200 m			H	16:05	F	17:40
400 m	H	17:55	F	19:40		
800 m			H	18:15	F	16:45
1500 m			H	17:05	F	16:15
5000 m	F	19:05				
10000 m			F	18:50		
110 m H			H	16:35	½	14:55
110 m H			H	16:35	F	16:55
400 m H	H	17:00	½	15:00		
400 m H	H	17:00	F	19:50		
3000 m SC	F	18:45				
High jump					F	15:30
Pole vault	F	18:00				
Long jump			F	18:30		
Triple jump					F	15:30
Shot put					F	13:00
Discus throw			F	15:00		
Hammer throw	F	19:00				
Javelin throw			F	18:30		

Women
Date →	Fri 8		Sat 9		Sun 10	
Event ↓	Round	Time	Round	Time	Round	Time
100 m	H	19:30	F	20:15		
200 m			H	15:45	F	17:50
400 m	H	17:30	F	18:40		
800 m			H	17:50	F	16:30
1500 m					F	15:50
5000 m					F	17:05
10000 m	F	20:05				
100 m H	H	18:15	½	17:30		
100 m H	H	18:15	F	20:00		
400 m H	H	15:00	½	15:20	F	16:05
3000 m SC					F	15:20
High jump					F	12:30
Pole vault			F	14:30		
Long jump	F	19:00				
Triple jump	F	16:00				
Shot put			F	15:30		
Discus throw	F	15:30				
Hammer throw					F	12:30
Javelin throw					F	16:00

== Medal summary ==
=== Men ===
Event	Gold		Silver		Bronze	
100 m (0.0 m/s)	Masashi Eriguchi	10.29	Takumi Kuki	10.30	Ryota Yamagata	10.34
200 m (0.0 m/s)	Kei Takase	20.42	Shota Iizuka	20.45	Shinji Takahira	20.56
400 m	Yuzo Kanemaru	46.18	Hiroyuki Nakano	46.23	Yoshihiro Azuma	46.26
800 m	Masato Yokota	1:48.12	Takeshi Kuchino	1:48.36	Shohei Oka	1:48.51
1500 m	Keisuke Tanaka	3:45.49	Hiroshi Ino	3:45.84	Tasuku Arai	3:46.03
5000 m	Kazuya Deguchi	13:47.17	Kensuke Takezawa	13:47.54	Yoshihiro Wakamatsu	13:47.75
10,000 m	Yuki Sato	28:18.15	Suguru Osako	28:18.53	Chihiro Miyawaki	28:20.76
110 m hurdles (-0.6 m/s)	Kenji Yahata	13.72	Yuto Aoki	13.85	Masanori Nishizawa	13.87
400 m hurdles	Takayuki Kishimoto	48.41	Akihiko Nakamura	49.38	Tetsuya Tateno	49.49
3000 m steeplechase	Minato Yamashita	8:34.95	Tsuyoshi Takeda	8:35.27	Aoi Matsumoto	8:37.06
High jump	Hiromi Takahari	2.20 m	Takashi Eto	2.20 m	Satoru Kubota	2.15 m
Pole vault	Seito Yamamoto	5.42 m	Daichi Sawano	5.42 m	Hiroki Ogita	5.32 m
Long jump	Daisuke Arakawa	7.78 m (-1.1 m/s)	Yohei Sugai	7.76 m (0.0 m/s)	Mamoru Niimura	7.75 m (+1.6 m/s)
Triple jump	Yuma Okabe	16.54 m (+0.7 m/s)	Daigo Hasegawa	16.17 m (+1.2 m/s)	Yohei Kajikawa	16.10 m (+1.9 m/s)
Shot put	Satoshi Hatase	17.91 m	Yohei Murakawa	17.86 m	Takanao Suzuki	17.25 m
Discus throw	Yuji Tsutsumi	56.19 m	Shigeo Hatakeyama	54.21 m	Masaru Miyauchi	53.46 m
Hammer throw	Koji Murofushi	72.85 m	Yuji Noguchi	71.22 m	Hiroaki Doi	69.80 m
Javelin throw	Genki Dean	84.03 m	Yukifumi Murakami	83.95 m	Ryohei Arai	76.97 m

=== Women ===
Event	Gold		Silver		Bronze	
100 m (0.0 m/s)	Chisato Fukushima	11.45	Anna Doi	11.51	Momoko Takahashi	11.66
200 m (+0.1 m/s)	Chisato Fukushima	23.35	Kana Ichikawa	23.62	Momoko Takahashi	23.74
400 m	Mayu Sato	53.86	Miho Shingu	54.12	Megumi Kageyama	54.27
800 m	Ruriko Kubo	2:04.18	Manami Mashita	2:04.78	Chihiro Sunaga	2:04.86
1500 m	Ayako Jinnouchi	4:16.42	Chikako Mori	4:18.53	Satoe Kikuchi	4:19.04
5000 m	Hitomi Niiya	15:17.92	Kayoko Fukushi	15:25.74	Misaki Onishi	15:32.89
10,000 m	Mika Yoshikawa	31:28.71	Kayoko Fukushi	31:43.25	Megumi Kinukawa	32:20.34
100 m hurdles (-0.7 m/s)	Ayako Kimura	13.27	Fumiko Kumagai	13.45	Hitomi Shimura	13.55
400 m hurdles	Satomi Kubokura	55.98	Tomomi Yoneda	56.62	Shiori Miki	57.15
3000 m steeplechase	Yoshika Arai	9:55.93	Hitomi Nakamura	9:57.55	Misato Horie	10:05.40
High jump	Azumi Maeda	1.80 m	Moeko Kyouya; Miyuki Fukumoto	1.75 m	-	-
Pole vault	Tomomi Abiko	4.40 m	Tomoko Sumiishi	4.10 m	Ayako Aoshima	4.00 m
Long jump	Saeko Okayama	6.55 m (0.0 m/s)	Sachiko Masumi	6.35 m (0.0 m/s)	Kumiko Imura	6.25 m (+1.5 m/s)
Triple jump	Fumiyo Yoshida	12.98 m (0.0 m/s)	Waka Maeda	12.91 m (0.0 m/s)	Mei Yamane	12.73 m (+0.7 m/s)
Shot put	Yukiko Shirai	15.41 m	Chiaki Yokomizo	14.84 m	Chihiro Shigeyama	14.75 m
Discus throw	Ai Shikimoto	52.74 m	Yuka Murofushi	52.37 m	Ayumi Takahashi	51.63 m
Hammer throw	Masumi Aya	64.91 m	Mika Takekawa	58.09 m	Wakana Sato	56.81 m
Javelin throw	Yuki Ebihara	62.36 m	Haruka Matoba	58.93 m	Risa Miyashita	58.27 m

== Official Sponsor ==
- Yamazaki Baking (Special Sponsor)
- ASICS
- Nike
- Otsuka Pharmaceutical
- Japan Airlines
- Nishi Sports
- Cerespo
- Osaka Gas (Special Offer)
