= 2009 Asian Athletics Championships – Women's long jump =

The women's long jump event at the 2009 Asian Athletics Championships was held at the Guangdong Olympic Stadium on November 10.

== Results ==
Rank	Athlete	Nationality	#1	#2	#3	#4	#5	#6	Result	Notes
1st place, gold medalist(s)	Marestella Torres	Philippines	6.27	6.20	6.51	6.19	6.41	6.26	6.51	SB
2nd place, silver medalist(s)	Chen Yaling	China	6.28	5.97	6.21	6.22	x	x	6.28	
3rd place, bronze medalist(s)	Sachiko Masumi	Japan	5.98	6.12	x	5.91	6.28	6.14	6.28	
4	Aleksandra Kotlyarova	Uzbekistan	5.97	6.12	x	5.89	6.23	6.15	6.23	
5	Kumiko Imura	Japan	5.86	x	6.11	6.17	5.87	6.15	6.17	
6	M. A. Prajusha	India	6.01	6.15	6.10	5.98	x	x	6.15	
7	Reshmi Bose	India	6.13	6.13	6.07	6.02	5.94	6.08	6.13	
8	C.D.Priyadharshani Nawanage	Sri Lanka	6.06	6.11	6.05	6.11	6.04	5.79	6.11	
9	Olessya Belyayeva	Kazakhstan	x	5.80	x				5.80	
10	Chung Hye-kyong	South Korea	x	5.78	x				5.78	
11	Cheung Lai Yee	Hong Kong	5.52	5.68	5.69				5.69	
12	Kang Hye Sun	North Korea	5.56	5.61	x				5.61	
13	Han Kyong Ae	North Korea	x	5.32	5.45				5.45	
14	Tse Mang Chi	Hong Kong	5.32	x	5.38				5.38	
	Siti Zubaidah Adabi	Malaysia							DNS	
	Bao Sha	China							DNS	
