= Miyauchi =

Miyauchi may refer to:

- Miyauchi (surname), a Japanese surname
- Miyauchi, Yamagata, a former town in Higashiokitama District, Yamagata Prefecture, Japan
- Miyauchi Station (disambiguation), multiple train stations
- 26319 Miyauchi, a main-belt asteroid
