= Lu Minjia =

Chinese long jumper (born 1992)

Medal record

Women's athletics

Representing China

Asian Championships
Gold medal – first place	2015 Wuhan	Long jump
Silver medal – second place	2011 Kobe	Long jump

Asian Indoor Championships
Gold medal – first place	2012 Hangzhou	Long jump

East Asian Games
Bronze medal – third place	2009 Hong Kong	Long jump

Lu Minjia (Chinese: 陆敏佳; born 29 December 1992) is a Chinese track and field athlete who competes in the long jump. She was the 2009 World Youth Champion and set an Asian youth record of 6.74 m (22 ft 1 1/4 in) that same year. After an Asian Junior title, she was runner-up at the 2011 Asian Athletics Championships. She won gold medals at the 2012 Asian Indoor Athletics Championships and the 2015 Asian Athletics Championships.

Lu represented her country at the Asian Games in 2010 and 2014, and has also represented the Asia-Pacific region at the IAAF Continental Cup (2014). She was the winner of the long jump at the 2009 National Games of China.

== Career ==
=== Youth and junior career ===
Lu, from the eastern province of Zhejiang, first took up athletics while at primary school and her talent for long jumping was noticed. She continued with the discipline in the region, joining the provincial level athletics club and went on to study at Zhejiang University.

Lu established herself at national level in 2008 when she won the Chinese Olympic trials event, improving a personal best by a large margin with a jump of 6.44 m (21 ft 1 1/2 in). At fifteen, she was the youngest athlete in the field and defeated Asian indoor champion Chen Yaling, but had not performed well enough to earn qualification. She was the world's number one ranked long jumper in the youth category in 2009 and claimed the gold medal at the 2009 World Youth Championships in Athletics with a jump of 6.22 m (20 ft 4 3/4 in). She again defeated Chen in Chinese competition, winning the 2009 Chinese Games title with an Asian youth record mark of 6.74 m (22 ft 1 1/4 in). In her first senior international competition she performed less well, but still managed a bronze medal at 2009 East Asian Games while Chen was the winner. She was the second highest ranked Asian woman that year, after Korea's Jung Soon-ok.

She made her global senior debut at the 2010 IAAF World Indoor Championships, still seventeen years old, and set an indoor best of 6.25 m (20 ft 6 in) in qualifying. She had her season's best jump of 6.47 m (21 ft 2 1/2 in) at the 2010 Asian Junior Athletics Championships, where she comfortably won the gold medal. She also shared in the 4×100 metres relay silver medal with Chen Lin, Jiang Shan, and Wu Shuijiao (having been upgraded from bronze after Kazakhstan was disqualified). In her last major performance of the year, she placed sixth at the 2010 Asian Games, clearing 6.36 m (20 ft 10 1/4 in) which was 17 cm short of Jung Soon-ok's winning result. Lu won her first national title at the Chinese Athletics Championships that year.

=== Asian senior medals ===
At the start of the 2011 indoor season she set an indoor best of 6.58 m (21 ft 7 in) to win in Nanjing. Going into the outdoor season, she was runner-up on countback to Japan's Saeko Okayama at the Golden Grand Prix in Kawasaki. Her outdoor best that year came in national competition in Jinan, where she won with a jump of 6.54 m (21 ft 5 1/4 in). She was close to this at the 2011 Asian Athletics Championships, a mark of 6.52 m (21 ft 4 1/2 in) being the best of her series, and was ahead of Okayama but beaten into second place by Mayookha Johny. Afterwards, she defended her national title at the Chinese Championships.

She won her first senior title at the 2012 Asian Indoor Athletics Championships, beating Kazakhstan's Anastassya Kudinova to the gold. Turning to the outdoor track and field circuit, she missed the Shanghai Golden Grand Prix meeting, but made her IAAF Diamond League at the Prefontaine Classic in the United States, finishing tenth. Her best of the year came at the Kanchanaburi leg of the Asian Athletics Grand Prix, at which she jumped 6.64 m (21 ft 9 1/4 in) to win ahead of India's Johny. She was herself beaten into second at the following leg in Bangkok by Uzbek Juliya Tarasova. She struggled the following year, failing to register a mark beyond six metres, and lost her title at the 12th National Games of China by ending the contest in eleventh place.

Lu returned to action in the 2014 season with her first appearance at the Shanghai Diamond League (coming tenth) and a third-place finish at the IAAF World Challenge Beijing. She was chosen as Asia's representative at the 2014 IAAF Continental Cup, finishing seventh, and placed sixth at the 2014 Asian Games. With her season's best of 6.57 m (21 ft 6 1/2 in) she ranked in the top fifty globally that year and was joint best Asian athlete alongside her compatriot Jiang Yanfei.

Building on her silver from four years earlier, on home soil in Wuhan Lu won the long jump title at the 2015 Asian Athletics Championships by a five-centimetre margin over South Korea's Jung Soon-ok.

== Personal bests ==
- Long jump outdoor: 6.74 m (22 ft 1 1/4 in) (2009)
- Long jump indoor: 6.58 m (21 ft 7 in) (2011)
- All personal bests from IAAF

== National titles ==
- Chinese Athletics Championships
  - Long jump: 2010, 2011
- National Games of China
  - Long jump: 2009

== International competitions ==
Year	Competition	Venue	Position	Event	Notes
2009	World Youth Championships	Bressanone, Italy	1st	Long jump	6.22 m
2009	East Asian Games	Hong Kong, China	3rd	Long jump	6.24 m
2010	World Indoor Championships	Doha, Qatar	17th (q)	Long jump	6.25 m
2010	Asian Junior Championships	Hanoi, Vietnam	1st	Long jump	6.47 m
2010	Asian Junior Championships	Hanoi, Vietnam	2nd	4 × 100 m relay	45.87
2010	Asian Games	Guangzhou, China	6th	Long jump	6.36 m
2011	Asian Championships	Kobe, Japan	2nd	Long jump	6.52 m
2012	Asian Indoor Championships	Hangzhou, China	1st	Long jump	6.33 m
2014	Continental Cup	Marrakesh, Morocco	7th	Long jump	6.14 m
2014	Asian Games	Incheon, South Korea	6th	Long jump	6.28 m
2015	Asian Championships	Wuhan, China	1st	Long jump	6.52
2015	World Championships	Beijing, China	30th (q)	Long jump	6.01 m
2018	Asian Games	Jakarta, Indonesia	4th	Long jump	6.50 m
2019	Asian Championships	Doha, Qatar	1st	Long jump	6.38 m
