= 2013 Asian Athletics Championships – Women's long jump =

The women's long jump at the 2013 Asian Athletics Championships was held at the Shree Shiv Chhatrapati Sports Complex on 3 July.

== Results ==
Rank	Name	Nationality	#1	#2	#3	#4	#5	#6	Result	Notes
1st place, gold medalist(s)	Sachiko Masumi	Japan	6.21	6.37	6.39	6.55	6.41	6.29	6.55	
2nd place, silver medalist(s)	Anastasiya Juravleva	Uzbekistan	6.09	6.26	6.36	6.26	6.03	6.25	6.36	
3rd place, bronze medalist(s)	Mayookha Johny	India	x	6.06	6.18	6.30	6.09	6.18	6.30	
4	Saeko Okayama	Japan	6.21	5.99	x	6.06	x	6.27	6.27	
5	Darya Reznichenko	Uzbekistan	6.06	6.18	x	6.24	5.88	5.86	6.24	
6	M. A. Prajusha	India	5.82	6.00	x	x	6.12	x	6.12	
7	Jung Soon-Ok	South Korea	x	x	6.02w	x	x	5.94	6.02w	
8	Wang Wupin	China	x	5.93	x	x	6.01	5.95	6.01	
9	Katherine Santos	Philippines	5.75	5.91	5.75				5.91	
10	Neena V.	India	5.71	5.44	5.75				5.75	
11	Anastassiya Kudinova	Kazakhstan	5.60	5.56	5.67				5.67	
