= Wang Wupin =

Chinese track and field athlete (born 1991)

Medal record

Women's athletics

Representing China

Asian Athletics Championships
Gold medal – first place	2015 Wuhan	Triple jump

Asian Indoor Athletics Championships
Bronze medal – third place	2012 Hangzhou	Long jump

Wang Wupin (Chinese: 王乌品；born 18 January 1991) is a Chinese track and field athlete who competes in the long jump and triple jump. She holds personal bests of 6.58 m (21 ft 7 in) and 14.10 m (46 ft 3 in) for the events, respectively. She was the gold medallist in the triple jump at the 2015 Asian Athletics Championships.

Her earliest successes came in the long jump, an event in which she was a medallist at the World Junior Championships in Athletics in 2010 and Asian Indoor Athletics Championships in 2012.

== Career ==
Wang competed in the long jump as a teenager and gradually rose on the national scene with improving yearly bests of 6.24 m (20 ft 5 1/2 in) in 2008, 6.38 m (20 ft 11 in) in 2009, and 6.58 m (21 ft 7 in) in 2010. The latter mark ranked her the second best junior category athlete in the world that season, behind Russia's Darya Klishina. At the 2010 World Junior Championships in Athletics she entered as the highest ranked athlete in the competition. Her last round effort of 6.23 m (20 ft 5 1/4 in) left her in the silver medal position behind Cuba's Irisdaymi Herrera.

Her best of the 2011 season came indoors on the national circuit, with a mark of 6.42 m (21 ft 3/4 in) in Nanjing. She failed to better that outdoors, placing eleventh at the 2011 Asian Athletics Championships, but continued with strong indoor performances the following year by taking her first senior medal – a bronze – at the 2012 Asian Indoor Athletics Championships on home soil in Hangzhou. She was beaten by her younger national rival, Lu Minjia. Her next major outing was the 2013 Asian Athletics Championships, where she was her country's only representative in the women's long jump, and she finished down in eighth at the competition. She did not jump much beyond six metres that year. Her best of the season was at the 12th Chinese National Games, where she jumped 6.24 m (20 ft 5 1/2 in) for third while representing her native Fujian. She returned to the site of her first medal at the 2014 Asian Indoor Athletics Championships, but finished in sixth while her countrywoman Jiang Yanfei took bronze.

Her 2014 best in the long jump was 6.42 m (21 ft 3/4 in), remaining some way off her personal best she had set as a teenager four years earlier. That season marked the beginning of her competing in the triple jump and she set a new best of 13.67 m (44 ft 10 in) in Beijing that August. It was the first time she ranked higher internationally in the triple jump rather than the long jump, as she edged into the top 90. At the beginning of 2015 she improved again to 13.70 m (44 ft 11 1/4 in) at an indoor meeting in Shanghai. Prior to the 2015 Asian Athletics Championships she had become the second highest ranked triple jump athlete in the region, after Olga Rypakova, through her clearance of 14.10 m (46 ft 3 in) in Beijing in May. In the absence of Rypakova, Wang led a Chinese medal sweep of the women's triple jump at the championships in Wuhan, becoming the Asian champion with a mark of 13.76 m (45 ft 1 1/2 in).

== Personal bests ==
- Long jump outdoor – 6.58 m (21 ft 7 in) (2010)
- Triple jump outdoor – 14.10 m (46 ft 3 in) (2015)
- Long jump indoor – 6.46 m (21 ft 2 1/4 in) (2013)
- Triple jump indoor – 13.70 m (44 ft 11 1/4 in) (2015)

== International competitions ==
Year	Competition	Venue	Position	Event	Notes
2010	World Junior Championships	Moncton, Canada	2nd	Long jump	6.23
2011	Asian Championships	Kobe, Japan	11th	Long jump	6.08
2012	Asian Indoor Championships	Hangzhou, China	3rd	Long jump	6.22
2013	Asian Championships	Pune, India	8th	Long jump	6.01
2014	Asian Indoor Championships	Hangzhou, China	6th	Long jump	6.13
2015	Asian Championships	Wuhan, China	1st	Triple jump	13.76
2015	Universiade	Gwangju, South Korea	4th	Triple jump	13.75
2015	World Championships	Beijing, China	23rd (q)	Triple jump	13.48
2016	Asian Indoor Championships	Doha, Qatar	4th	Triple jump	13.42
2018	Asian Games	Jakarta, Indonesia	5th	Triple jump	13.58
