= Athletics at the 2008 Summer Olympics – Women's long jump =

Women's long jump at the Games of the XXIX Olympiad
- Venue: Beijing National Stadium
- Dates: 19 August 2008 (qualification); 22 August 2008 (final)
- Competitors: 42 from 33 nations
- Winning distance: 7.04

Medalists
1st place, gold medalist(s)		Maurren Maggi	Brazil
2nd place, silver medalist(s)		Blessing Okagbare	Nigeria
3rd place, bronze medalist(s)		Chelsea Hammond	Jamaica

The women's long jump at the 2008 Summer Olympics took place on 19 and 22 August at the Beijing National Stadium. The winning margin was 13 cm.

The qualifying standards were 6.72 m (A standard) and 6.60 m (B standard).

== Summary ==
In the qualifying round, Blessing Okagbare was the last qualifier, jumping 6.59m on her final attempt to knock out Tatyana Kotova and triple jump bronze medalist, Hrysopiyí Devetzí out of the final by 2 cm. #1 qualifier Brittney Reese jumped 6.65m as the first jump in the final, which held up for five jumps until Tatyana Lebedeva jumped 6.97m. Four more jumps later, Maurren Maggi's 7.04 m (23 ft 1 in) winner was the only jump of the competition to best Lebedeva. The penultimate jumper Chelsea Hammond jumped 6.79m, then the 19 year old Okagbare hit a 6.91m. Those first round jumps settled the competition. Only Lebedeva was able to improve with a 7.03m final attempt, but it was still 1 cm short of capturing gold.

In 2017, retests showed Tatyana Lebedeva had a positive test for turinabol and was disqualified from both her silver medals. The IOC requested that the IAAF modify the results, and, after CAS dismisses the appeal of Tatyana Lebedeva, the medals were redistributed accordingly. Blessing Okagbare was advanced to silver, and Chelsea Hammond was advanced to bronze.

== Records ==
Prior to this competition, the existing world record, Olympic record, and world leading jump were as follows:

World record	Galina Chistyakova (URS)	7.52	Leningrad, Soviet Union	11 June 1988
Olympic record	Jackie Joyner-Kersee (USA)	7.40	Seoul, South Korea	29 September 1988
World Leading	Naide Gomes (POR)	7.12	Fontvieille, Monaco	29 July 2008

No new world or Olympic records were set for this event.

== Results ==
=== Qualifying round ===
Qualifying performance 6.75 (Q) or at least 12 best performers (q) advance to the final.

Rank	Group	Name	Nationality	1	2	3	Mark	Notes
1	B	Brittney Reese	United States	x	6.87 (+1.1)		6.87	Q
2	A	Maurren Higa Maggi	Brazil	6.68 (+0.3)	6.79 (+0.3)		6.79	Q
3	B	Tatyana Lebedeva	Russia	6.65 (+0.7)	6.70 (+1.4)	-	6.70	DSQ
4	A	Carolina Klüft	Sweden	6.70 (+1.0)	x	-	6.70	q
5	A	Grace Upshaw	United States	6.47 (−0.2)	6.68 (+0.6)	x	6.68	q
6	A	Oksana Udmurtova	Russia	6.48 (+1.3)	x	6.63 (+0.5)	6.63	q
7	B	Keila Costa	Brazil	x	6.44 (+0.4)	6.62 (+0.7)	6.62	q
8	A	Tabia Charles	Canada	6.33 (+1.5)	6.61 (+0.6)	6.49 (+0.9)	6.61	q
9	A	Funmi Jimoh	United States	6.42 (+0.9)	6.28 (+1.1)	6.61 (+0.8)	6.61	q
10	B	Jade Johnson	Great Britain	6.33 (0.0)	6.15 (+0.2)	6.61 (+0.7)	6.61	q
11	A	Chelsea Hammond	Jamaica	6.60 (+0.4)	x	x	6.60	q
12	B	Blessing Okagbare	Nigeria	6.37 (+0.2)	6.49 (+0.9)	6.59 (+0.4)	6.59	q
13	B	Tatyana Kotova	Russia	6.37 (+1.0)	6.57 (+1.2)	x	6.57	
14	A	Hrysopiyí Devetzí	Greece	x	6.57 (+0.4)	x	6.57	
15	B	Concepción Montaner	Spain	6.53 (+0.7)	6.42 (+1.1)	6.43 (+0.7)	6.53	
16	B	Bronwyn Thompson	Australia	x	6.53 (+0.3)	x	6.53	
17	A	Yargelis Savigne	Cuba	x	x	6.49 (+0.1)	6.49	
18	B	Iryna Charnushenka-Stasiuk	Belarus	6.48 (+1.1)	x	x	6.48	
19	B	Kumiko Ikeda	Japan	6.44 (+0.8)	6.47 (+0.1)	x	6.47	
20	A	Denisa Ščerbová	Czech Republic	6.40 (+0.8)	6.46 (+1.5)	5.17 (−0.1)	6.46	
21	A	Patricia Sylvester	Grenada	6.44 (+0.9)	6.42 (+0.1)	6.38 (+0.4)	6.44	
22	B	Viorica Țigău	Romania	x	6.38 (+0.7)	6.44 (+0.2)	6.44	
23	A	Viktoriya Rybalko	Ukraine	x	x	6.43 (+0.3)	6.43	
24	A	Karin Melis Mey	Turkey	x	6.42 (−0.4)	x	6.42	
25	B	Ruky Abdulai	Canada	x	6.41 (+0.4)	6.25 (+1.0)	6.41	
26	A	Nina Kolarič	Slovenia	4.92 (+1.4)	6.19 (0.0)	6.40 (+0.6)	6.40	
27	B	Ksenija Balta	Estonia	x	6.38 (+0.7)	x	6.38	
28	B	Soon-ok Jung	South Korea	x	x	6.33 (+0.5)	6.33	
29	B	Olga Rypakova	Kazakhstan	x	6.30 (+1.5)	6.04 (+0.6)	6.30	
30	B	Ivana Španović	Serbia	x	x	6.30 (+1.8)	6.30	
31	A	Naide Gomes	Portugal	x	x	6.29 (+0.5)	6.29	
32	A	Volha Sergeenka	Belarus	6.25 (+0.1)	6.02 (+0.4)	6.09 (−0.6)	6.25	
33	B	Oleksandra Stadnyuk	Ukraine	x	6.19 (0.0)	x	6.19	
34	B	Marestella Torres	Philippines	4.27 (+0.6)	5.94 (−0.1)	6.17 (+0.8)	6.17	
35	A	Pamela Mouele-Mboussi	Republic of the Congo	x	5.94 (+0.6)	6.06 (+0.9)	6.06	NR
36	B	Arantxa King	Bermuda	6.01 (−0.3)	x	x	6.01	
37	A	Rhonda Watkins	Trinidad and Tobago	x	5.88 (+0.5)	x	5.88	
38	A	Tricia Flores	Belize	5.25 (+1.2)	x	-	5.25	
—	B	Anju Bobby George	India	x	x	x	NM	
—	B	Jackie Edwards	Bahamas	x	x	x	NM	
—	A	Jana Velďáková	Slovakia	x	x	x	NM	
—	A	Lyudmyla Blonska	Ukraine				DSQ	

Q - Qualified by right / q - Qualified by result / NM - No Mark / NR - National Record / SB - Season Best / DSQ - Disqualified

=== Final ===
22 August 2008 - 19:20

Rank	Name	Nationality	1	2	3	4	5	6	Result	Notes
1st place, gold medalist(s)	Maurren Higa Maggi	Brazil	7.04	x	x	x	6.73	x	7.04	SB
2nd place, silver medalist(s)	Blessing Okagbare	Nigeria	6.91	6.62	6.79	6.70	6.83	x	6.91	PB
3rd place, bronze medalist(s)	Chelsea Hammond	Jamaica	6.79	6.68	6.51	x	6.64	6.59	6.79	PB
4	Brittney Reese	United States	6.65	6.76	4.23	x	6.46	6.67	6.76	
5	Oksana Udmurtova	Russia	6.69	6.70	6.67	6.61	6.65	6.49	6.70	
6	Jade Johnson	Great Britain	6.51	6.64	6.40	6.59	6.43	x	6.64	
7	Grace Upshaw	United States	6.58	x	6.52	x	x	x	6.58	
8	Carolina Klüft	Sweden	x	6.49	6.42				6.49	
9	Tabia Charles	Canada	6.16	6.38	6.47				6.47	
10	Keila Costa	Brazil	x	x	6.43				6.43	
11	Funmi Jimoh	United States	6.24	x	6.29				6.29	
DQ	Tatyana Lebedeva	Russia	~~6.97~~	x	x	x	x	~~7.03~~	~~7.03~~	~~SB~~
