= Sachiko Masumi =

Japanese long jumper (born 1984)

Personal information
- Nationality: Japanese
- Born: December 1984 (age 41) Kagawa Prefecture, Japan
- Education: Fukuoka University
- Height: 1.75 m (5 ft 9 in)
- Weight: 62 kg (137 lb)

Sport
- Country: Japan
- Sport: Track and field
- Event: Long jump
- Retired: March 2020
- Personal best(s): Long jump: 6.65 (Hiroshima 2009); Triple jump: 13.34 (Fukuoka 2012)
Medal record
Women's athletics
Representing Japan
Asian Championships
Gold medal – first place	2013 Pune	Long jump
Bronze medal – third place	2009 Guangzhou	Long jump

Sachiko Masumi (桝見 咲智子, Masumi Sachiko; born 20 December 1984) is a retired Japanese track and field athlete who competes in the long jump. She has a personal best of 6.65 metres for the long jump and occasionally competes in the triple jump, having a best of 13.34 m for that event. She was the Japanese Champion in the event in 2008 and 2009.

She was the gold medallist at the Asian Athletics Championships in 2013 and was the bronze medallist at the competition in 2009. She represented her country at the 2009 World Championships in Athletics and has also competed for Japan at the Asian Games and the Summer Universiade.

== Career ==
Born in Kagawa Prefecture, Sachiko Masumi went to Akiyoshi junior high school and competing in a variety of track and field events in her youth. She began to have success in the long jump and in her last year of junior high school she competed at the Japanese Athletics Championships, placing third and clearing six metres for the first time. While attending Hideaki High School, she won the national high schools title in 2001 and broke the national junior record with a clearance of 6.43 m in 2002. In her last year of senior high school she placed third in the long jump at the national championships and came third in the triple jump at the National Sports Festival of Japan.

Masumi attended Fukuoka University, studying sports science, and competed at the 2005 Summer Universiade. She finally improved upon her 2002 best in 2006, her fourth and final year at the university, with a jump of 6.53 m at the Osaka Grand Prix. After graduation she moved into the Japanese corporate system, competing for the Kyudenko Corporation. In her first year of professional competition she had a season's best of 6.45 m to take second at the Japanese Championships and placed fourth at the 2007 Asian Athletics Championships. Her first national title followed in 2008, but she was not chosen for the 2008 Beijing Olympics.

Masumi had a successive win at the national championships in 2009, clearing a personal best of 6.65 m and defeating Kumiko Ikeda. This led to her first appearance at a major championships, but she failed to get past the qualifying stage of the 2009 World Championships in Athletics in Berlin. She won the long jump titles at the Japanese corporate championships and the National Games then took the bronze medal at the 2009 Asian Athletics Championships (her first international medal).

Although Masumi won at the Shizuoka International with a jump of 6.59 m in May, Ikeda got the better of her at the 2010 Japanese Championships a month later. Both competed at the 2010 Asian Games, but neither won a medal and Masumi placed eighth. She was absent for the 2011 season but returned in 2012. That year she placed second at the national championships, did a long jump/triple jump double at the corporate championship, and won the triple jump at the Japanese Games. Masumi was again runner-up nationally at the 2013 Japanese Championships, beaten this time by Saeko Okayama. She bested her rival at the 2013 Asian Athletics Championships, however, clearing 6.55 m to win the gold medal and her first major title.

== Personal bests ==
Event	Measure (m)	Competition	Venue	Date	Notes
Long jump	6.65 (wind: +1.4 m/s)	National Championships	Hiroshima, Japan	28 June 2009	
Triple jump	13.34 (wind: +0.6 m/s)	National Corporate Championships	Fukuoka, Japan	23 September 2012	
Triple jump	13.68 (wind: +2.7 m/s)	National Sports Festival	Gifu, Japan	7 October 2012	Wind-assisted

== International competition ==
Year	Competition	Venue	Position	Event	Measure (m)	Notes
Representing Japan
2005	Universiade	Izmir, Turkey	20th (q)	Long jump	6.00 (wind: +0.7 m/s)	
2007	Asian Championships	Amman, Jordan	4th	Long jump	6.34 (wind: +4.0 m/s)	
2009	World Championships	Berlin, Germany	26th (q)	Long jump	6.23 (wind: +0.5 m/s)	
2009	Asian Championships	Guangzhou, China	3rd	Long jump	6.28 (wind: -0.9 m/s)	
2010	Asian Games	Guangzhou, China	8th	Long jump	6.11 (wind: +0.5 m/s)	
2013	Asian Championships	Pune, India	1st	Long jump	6.55 (wind: 0.0 m/s)	SB
2017	Asian Championships	Bhubaneswar, India	7th	Long jump	6.11 (wind: +0.5 m/s)	
2017	Asian Championships	Bhubaneswar, India	8th	Triple jump	12.59 (wind: +1.0 m/s)	

== National titles ==
- National Championships
  - Long jump: 2008, 2009
