= Athletics at the 2007 Summer Universiade – Women's long jump =

The women's long jump event at the 2007 Summer Universiade was held on 9–10 August.

== Medalists ==
| Gold | Silver | Bronze |
|---|---|---|
| Olga Rypakova; Kazakhstan | Yelena Sokolova; Russia | Stiliani Pilatou; Greece |

== Results ==
=== Qualification ===
Qualification: 6.20 m (Q) or at least 12 best (q) qualified for the final.

| Rank | Athlete | Nationality | #1 | #2 | #3 | Result | Notes |
|---|---|---|---|---|---|---|---|
| 1 | Jana Velďáková | Slovakia | 6.64 | | | 6.64 | Q |
| 2 | Olga Rypakova | Kazakhstan | x | 6.55 | | 6.55 | Q |
| 3 | Stiliani Pilatou | Greece | 6.18 | 6.10 | 6.51 | 6.51 | Q |
| 4 | Anna Nazarova | Russia | 6.45 | | | 6.45 | Q |
| 5 | Oleksandra Stadnyuk | Ukraine | 6.10 | 6.42 | | 6.42 | Q |
| 6 | Elysée Vesanes | France | 6.16 | 6.35 | | 6.35 | Q |
| 7 | Lauren Boden | Australia | 6.33 | | | 6.33 | Q |
| 8 | Nina Kolarič | Slovenia | 6.30 | | | 6.30 | Q |
| 9 | Yelena Sokolova | Russia | 6.28 | | | 6.28 | Q |
| 10 | Valeria Canella | Italy | 6.27 | | | 6.27 | Q |
| 11 | Veranika Shutkova | Belarus | x | 6.25 | | 6.25 | Q |
| 12 | Volha Siarheyenka | Belarus | 5.81 | 6.24 | | 6.24 | Q |
| 13 | Jung Soon-Ok | South Korea | 6.21 | | | 6.21 | Q |
| 14 | Tanja Prudic | Slovenia | x | 6.00 | 6.10 | 6.10 | |
| 15 | Jessica Penney | New Zealand | x | 6.06 | x | 6.06 | |
| 16 | Liu Xiao | China | 5.96 | 6.02 | x | 6.02 | |
| 17 | Pamela Chardene | Republic of the Congo | 6.01 | 3.79 | x | 6.01 | |
| 18 | Petra Munt | Spain | x | 5.77 | 6.00 | 6.00 | |
| 19 | Natalya Belonog | Kazakhstan | 5.86 | 5.99 | 5.83 | 5.99 | |
| 20 | Mayookha Johny | India | x | 5.89 | 5.97 | 5.97 | |
| 21 | Elina Sorsa | Finland | 5.96 | 5.79 | 5.85 | 5.96 | |
| 22 | Rita Babos | Hungary | 5.93 | x | x | 5.93 | |
| 23 | Sirada Seechaichana | Thailand | 5.84 | 5.65 | 5.62 | 5.84 | |
| 24 | Wang Ying | China | 5.65 | 5.72 | 5.78 | 5.78 | |
| 25 | Claudette Martínez | Mexico | 5.36 | x | 5.50 | 5.50 | |
| 26 | Anine Moufida | Algeria | 5.48 | x | 5.25 | 5.48 | |
| 27 | Laurice Cristina Félix | Brazil | x | x | 5.45 | 5.45 | |
| 28 | Lotte Thiesen | Denmark | 5.34 | 5.43 | 5.35 | 5.43 | |
| 29 | Maty Salame | Senegal | x | x | 5.27 | 5.27 | |
| 30 | Enirahs Martina | Netherlands Antilles | x | 4.36 | 5.15 | 5.15 | |
| 31 | Odatte Rasolonirina | Madagascar | 4.94 | 4.95 | 4.86 | 4.95 | |
| 32 | Thitima Muangjan | Thailand | 3.84 | – | – | 3.84 | |
| | Veera Baranova | Estonia | | | | DNS | |

=== Final ===
| Rank | Athlete | Nationality | #1 | #2 | #3 | #4 | #5 | $6 | Result | Notes |
|---|---|---|---|---|---|---|---|---|---|---|
| 1st place, gold medalist(s) | Olga Rypakova | Kazakhstan | x | 6.46 | 6.49 | 6.82 | 6.85 | 6.64 | 6.85 | SB |
| 2nd place, silver medalist(s) | Yelena Sokolova | Russia | x | 6.50 | 6.61 | x | x | x | 6.61 | |
| 3rd place, bronze medalist(s) | Stiliani Pilatou | Greece | 6.36 | 5.89 | x | 6.24 | 6.52 | x | 6.52 | |
| 4 | Jung Soon-Ok | South Korea | 6.50 | 6.45 | 6.31 | x | 6.37 | x | 6.50 | |
| 5 | Anna Nazarova | Russia | 6.37 | x | 6.50 | x | x | 6.44 | 6.50 | |
| 6 | Lauren Boden | Australia | 6.24 | 6.40 | 6.26 | x | x | x | 6.40 | PB |
| 7 | Oleksandra Stadnyuk | Ukraine | 6.09 | x | 6.37 | 4.50 | 6.33 | 6.39 | 6.39 | |
| 8 | Veranika Shutkova | Belarus | x | 6.27 | 6.38 | 6.22 | 6.09 | x | 6.38 | |
| 9 | Elysée Vesanes | France | x | 6.08 | 6.32 | | | | 6.32 | |
| 10 | Jana Velďáková | Slovakia | x | 6.27 | 6.30 | | | | 6.30 | |
| 11 | Volha Siarheyenka | Belarus | 6.04 | 6.27 | 5.92 | | | | 6.27 | |
| 12 | Valeria Canella | Italy | x | x | 6.23 | | | | 6.23 | |
| 13 | Nina Kolarič | Slovenia | 3.45 | 6.02 | 6.16 | | | | 6.16 | |
