= Athletics at the 2004 Summer Olympics – Women's long jump =

Women's long jump at the Games of the XXVIII Olympiad
- Olympic Athletics
- Venue: Olympic Stadium
- Date: 25–27 August
- Competitors: 39 from 27 nations
- Winning distance: 7.07

Medalists
1st place, gold medalist(s)		Tatyana Lebedeva	Russia
2nd place, silver medalist(s)		Irina Simagina	Russia
3rd place, bronze medalist(s)		Tatyana Kotova	Russia

The women's long jump competition at the 2004 Summer Olympics in Athens was held at the Olympic Stadium on 25–27 August. The winning margin was 2 cm.

== Competition format ==
The competition consisted of two rounds, qualification and final. In qualification, each athlete jumped three times (stopping early if they made the qualifying distance). At least the top twelve athletes moved on to the final; if more than twelve reached the qualifying distance, all who did so advanced. Distances were reset for the final round. Finalists jumped three times, after which the eight best jumped three more times (with the best distance of the six jumps counted).

== Schedule ==
All times are Greece Standard Time (UTC+2)

Date	Time	Round
Wednesday, 25 August 2004	21:20	Qualification
Friday, 27 August 2004	20:00	Final

== Records ==
Prior to the competition, the existing world record, Olympic record, and world leading jump were as follows:

World record	Galina Chistyakova (URS)	7.52 m	Leningrad, Soviet Union	11 June 1988
Olympic record	Jackie Joyner-Kersee (USA)	7.40 m	Seoul, South Korea	29 September 1988
World Leading	Tatyana Lebedeva (RUS)	7.33	Tula, Russia	31 July 2004

No new records were set during the competition.

== Results ==
=== Qualifying round ===
Rule: Qualifying standard 6.65 (Q) or at least 12 best qualified (q).

Rank	Group	Name	Nationality	#1	#2	#3	Result	Notes
1	B	Tatyana Lebedeva	Russia	6.95	—	—	6.95	Q
2	B	Bronwyn Thompson	Australia	6.63	x	6.80	6.80	Q, =SB
3	B	Tatyana Kotova	Russia	6.79	—	—	6.79	Q
4	A	Irina Simagina	Russia	6.75	—	—	6.75	Q
5	B	Carolina Klüft	Sweden	6.73	—	—	6.73	Q
6	A	Jade Johnson	Great Britain	x	5.01	6.71	6.71	Q
7	A	Marion Jones	United States	x	6.70	—	6.70	Q
8	A	Bianca Kappler	Germany	6.59	6.36	6.69	6.69	Q
9	A	Anju Bobby George	India	6.69	—	—	6.69	Q
10	A	Grace Upshaw	United States	6.55	6.68	—	6.68	Q
11	A	Yelena Kashcheyeva	Kazakhstan	x	6.43	6.57	6.57	q
12	A	Tünde Vaszi	Hungary	6.41	6.55	6.36	6.55	q
13	A	Ineta Radēviča	Latvia	6.53	6.42	—	6.53	SB
14	A	Jackie Edwards	Bahamas	x	6.53	x	6.53	
14	B	Wang Lina	China	6.53	x	x	6.53	
16	B	Heli Koivula Kruger	Finland	x	6.49	6.50	6.50	
17	A	Ioanna Kafetzi	Greece	6.49	x	6.41	6.49	
18	B	Adina Anton	Romania	6.45	6.47	6.14	6.47	
19	A	Guan Yingnan	China	6.38	6.46	x	6.46	
20	B	Rose Richmond	United States	6.46	6.14	6.29	6.46	
21	A	Antoniya Yordanova	Bulgaria	6.45	6.31	6.28	6.45	
22	A	Kene Ndoye	Senegal	6.10	6.25	6.45	6.45	
23	B	Stiliani Pilatou	Greece	6.42	x	6.27	6.42	
24	B	Valentīna Gotovska	Latvia	x	6.41	6.40	6.41	
25	A	Denisa Ščerbová	Czech Republic	6.31	6.39	x	6.39	
26	B	Zita Ajkler	Hungary	6.39	6.25	x	6.39	
27	B	Anastasiya Juravleva	Uzbekistan	x	6.39	x	6.39	
28	A	Fiona May	Italy	6.24	6.36	6.38	6.38	
29	A	Eunice Barber	France	6.28	6.37	6.35	6.37	
30	B	Yudelkis Fernández	Cuba	6.36	6.28	6.19	6.36	
31	B	Keila Costa	Brazil	x	6.33	6.26	6.33	
32	B	Niki Xanthou	Greece	x	6.31	6.27	6.31	
33	A	Lerma Gabito	Philippines	6.31	5.96	6.13	6.31	
34	B	Maho Hanaoka	Japan	4.67	x	6.31	6.31	
35	B	Liang Shuyan	China	x	5.92	x	5.92	
36	A	Tina Čarman	Slovenia	x	x	5.72	5.72	
37	B	Svetlana Pessova	Turkmenistan	x	5.64	5.58	5.64	
	A	Alina Militaru	Romania	x	—	—	NM	
	B	Niurka Montalvo	Spain	x	x	x	NM	

=== Final ===
Rank	Name	Nationality	1	2	3	4	5	6	Result	Notes
1st place, gold medalist(s)	Tatyana Lebedeva	Russia	x	7.07	x	6.82	7.05	x	7.07	
2nd place, silver medalist(s)	Irina Simagina	Russia	7.05	7.02	x	x	x	x	7.05	
3rd place, bronze medalist(s)	Tatyana Kotova	Russia	7.05	x	6.84	6.70	x	6.76	7.05	SB
4	Bronwyn Thompson	Australia	6.79	x	6.92	6.96	x	6.70	6.96	SB
5	Anju Bobby George	India	6.83	6.75	x	6.68	6.61	x	6.83	NR
6	Jade Johnson	Great Britain	6.74	6.80	x	x	x	6.67	6.80	PB
7	Tünde Vaszi	Hungary	6.73	6.53	6.64	6.59	x	6.63	6.73	SB
8	Bianca Kappler	Germany	6.26	6.49	6.66				6.66	
9	Grace Upshaw	United States	6.64	x	6.64				6.64	
10	Carolina Klüft	Sweden	6.63	6.62	x				6.63	
11	Yelena Kashcheyeva	Kazakhstan	x	6.53	6.27				6.53	
	Marion Jones	United States	x	~~6.85~~	~~6.82~~	~~6.73~~	x	~~6.63~~	~~6.85~~	DSQ
