= 2002 Asian Athletics Championships – Women's long jump =

The women's long jump event at the 2002 Asian Athletics Championships was held in Colombo, Sri Lanka on 10 August.

== Results ==
Rank	Name	Nationality	Result	Notes
1st place, gold medalist(s)	Yelena Koshcheyeva	Kazakhstan	6.61	
2nd place, silver medalist(s)	Lerma Gabito	Philippines	6.40w	
3rd place, bronze medalist(s)	Marestella Torres	Philippines	6.40w	
4	Mariya Sokova	Uzbekistan	6.35w	
5	Kumiko Ikeda	Japan	6.32w	
6	Gu Ying	China	6.32	
7	Jin Yan	China	6.31	
8	Warunee Kittirihun	Thailand	6.16	PB
9	Nayanthi Chandrasena	Sri Lanka	6.14	
10	Elena Bobrovskaya	Kyrgyzstan	6.08	
11	Phan Thi Thu Lan	Vietnam	6.01	
12	Anusha Ekneligoda	Sri Lanka	5.94	
13	Kim Soo-Yun	South Korea	5.73	
14	D.K. Hemachandra	Sri Lanka	5.33	PB
15	Rima Taha Farid	Jordan	4.93	SB
