= 2005 Asian Athletics Championships – Women's long jump =

The women's long jump event at the 2005 Asian Athletics Championships was held in Incheon, South Korea on September 4.

== Results ==
Rank	Name	Nationality	Result	Notes
1st place, gold medalist(s)	Anju Bobby George	India	6.65	
2nd place, silver medalist(s)	Marestella Torres	Philippines	6.63	
3rd place, bronze medalist(s)	Kumiko Imura	Japan	6.52	
4	Olga Rypakova	Kazakhstan	6.50	
5	Zhong Mei	China	6.43	
6	Lerma Gabito	Philippines	6.40	
7	Anastasiya Juravleva	Uzbekistan	6.38	
8	Maho Hanaoka	Japan	6.35	
9	Jung Soon-Ok	South Korea	6.33	
10	Kim Soo-Yun	South Korea	6.23	
11	Olesya Belyayeva	Kazakhstan	6.16	
12	Fadwa Al-Bouza	Syria	5.52	
13	Park Song Hui	North Korea	5.51	PB
14	Kang Hye Soon	North Korea	5.35	PB
15	Hikmat Alaa Jassem	Iraq	4.94	PB
