= 2003 Asian Athletics Championships – Women's long jump =

The women's long jump event at the 2003 Asian Athletics Championships was held in Manila, Philippines on September 21.

== Results ==
| Rank | Name | Nationality | Result | Notes |
|---|---|---|---|---|
| 1st place, gold medalist(s) | Anastasiya Juravleva | Uzbekistan | 6.53 | |
| 2nd place, silver medalist(s) | Liang Shuyan | China | 6.51 | SB |
| 3rd place, bronze medalist(s) | Lerma Gabito | Philippines | 6.50 | SB |
| 4 | Marestella Torres | Philippines | 6.34 | SB |
| 5 | Jin Yan | China | 6.24 | |
| 6 | Yelena Kashcheyeva | Kazakhstan | 6.23 | |
| 7 | Wacharee Ritthiwat | Thailand | 6.15 | |
| 8 | Elena Bobrovskaya | Kyrgyzstan | 6.12 | |
| 9 | Olesya Belyayeva | Kazakhstan | 5.90 | |
| 10 | Fumiyo Yoshida | Japan | 5.68 | |
| 11 | Wang Kuo-Huei | Chinese Taipei | 5.67 | |
| 12 | Lo Yu-Hsin | Chinese Taipei | 5.48 | |
| 13 | Lai Tsui Shan | Hong Kong | 5.39 | |
