= 2000 Asian Athletics Championships – Women's long jump =

The women's long jump event at the 2000 Asian Athletics Championships was held in Jakarta, Indonesia on 30 August.

== Results ==
Rank	Name	Nationality	#1	#2	#3	#4	#5	#6	Result	Notes
1st place, gold medalist(s)	Yelena Bobrovskaya	Kyrgyzstan	6.42	6.41	6.57	6.55	6.66	6.56	6.66	
2nd place, silver medalist(s)	Liang Shuyan	China	6.64	x	x	6.45	6.62	6.50	6.64	
3rd place, bronze medalist(s)	Maho Hanaoka	Japan	6.40	6.53	6.61	6.32	x	x	6.61	=NR
4	Lerma Bulauitan	Philippines							6.36	
5	Pramila Ganapathy	India							6.35	
6	Soma Biswas	India							6.32	
7	Wang Kuo-Huei	Chinese Taipei							6.16	
8	Phan Thi Thu Lan	Vietnam							6.08	
9	Miao Chunqing	China							6.05	
10	Anna Tarasova	Kazakhstan							5.92	
