= Liang Shuyan =

Chinese long jumper (born 1977)

Medal record

Women's athletics

Representing China

Asian Championships
| Silver medal – second place | 2000 Jakarta | Long jump |
| Silver medal – second place | 2003 Manila | Lond jump |

Liang Shuyan (simplified Chinese: 梁淑艳; traditional Chinese: 梁淑豔; pinyin: Liáng Shúyàn; born September 16, 1977, in Heilongjiang) is a retired Chinese long jumper. Her personal best jump was 6.71 metres, achieved in July 2004 in Manila.

At the 2004 Summer Olympics she was eliminated in the first round of the long jump competition.

== Achievements ==
| Year | Competition | Venue | Position | Notes |
Representing China
| 2000 | Asian Championships | Jakarta, Indonesia | 2nd | 6.64 m |
| 2003 | Asian Championships | Manila, Philippines | 2nd | 6.51 m |
| 2004 | Olympic Games | Athens, Greece | 35th (q) | 5.92 m |
