= Chelsea Hammond =

Jamaican long jumper (born 1982)

Personal information
- Nationality: Jamaica
- Born: 2 August 1982 (age 44) New York, New York; United States
- Height: 1.75 m (5 ft 9 in)

Sport
- Sport: Athletics
- Event: Long jump
- Team: South Carolina Gamecocks (USA)

Achievements and titles
- Personal best: Long jump: 6.79 m
Medal record
Olympic Games
Bronze medal – third place	Athletics at the 2008 Summer Olympics	long jump

Chelsea Hammond (born 2 August 1983 in New York City) is a Jamaican long jumper, who competed at the 2008 Summer Olympics in Beijing. She nearly missed out of the podium in the women's long jump, when Nigeria's Blessing Okagbare obtained her best possible mark of 6.91 metres at her third attempt, to claim the bronze medal. In 2017, the second-place finisher, Tatyana Lebedeva had a positive test for turinabol and was disqualified from her silver medal. The medals were redistributed and Blessing Okagbare was advanced to silver, and Chelsea Hammond was advanced to bronze.

== Personal life ==
Born and raised in New York City by Jamaican parents, Hammond is a graduate of Elmont Memorial High School, where she became a state champion in the long jump. In 2004, she attended on a track scholarship, and eventually received a Bachelor of Arts degree major in psychology at the University of South Carolina in Columbia. Hammond was also a full-fledged varsity track and field athlete of the South Carolina Gamecocks, and had been actively participating for the long jump, high jump, and heptathlon in NCAA and SEC Championships. She was also a four-time All-American champion, and achieved two titles each for both indoor and outdoor collegiate meets.

== Athletic career ==
Following her graduation from the university, Hammond turned professional, and focused on her long jump career. She started training with numerous sporting personalities, including Olympic gold medalist Dwight Phillips, and Tom Tellez, who served as her personal coach. She also received her first sponsorship with Puma, and eventually competed at the Supreme Ventures National Senior and Junior Championships in Kingston. Hammond set a personal best in the long jump of 6.58 metres for her first few attempts, until she dominated the event from the start to post a successful wind-aided distance of 6.87 metres, which was slightly farther from her record. At the Jamaican Olympic Trials, Hammond claimed the national title, with an astonishing performance of 6.61 metres, which had guaranteed her qualifying place at the Olympics.

Hammond competed in the women's long jump at the 2008 Summer Olympics in Beijing. She performed the best jump of 6.60 metres in her first attempt, despite having received two fouls throughout the entire qualifying round. Although she did not reach the mandatory target of 6.75 metres, Hammond progressed to the final round based on her performance, placing twelfth out of forty-two athletes in the event. Hammond, however, was eventually upgraded to the eleventh position, when Ukraine's Lyudmila Blonska was disqualified in the competition after being tested positive for a banned substance. Because of a major circumstance, she was consequently joined with Nigeria's Blessing Okagbare, who finished behind her in the overall rankings by just a single meter difference. Two days later, Hammond challenged eleven other athletes, including Brazil's Maurren Maggi and Russia's Tatyana Lebedeva, in the final round of the competition. She jumped on her first attempt, with a personal best of 6.71 metres, until Okagbare extended her mark by twelve metres (6.91 metres) to capture the bronze medal. Hammond missed out of the podium, placing fourth overall in the event.

Hammond also trained to compete for the 2012 Summer Olympics in London, but missed out of the national trials by a career-ending stress fracture of her spine. She currently lives in Atlanta, Georgia, although she spends time with her family in Elmont, New York.
