= Yurina Hiraka =

Japanese long jumper (born 1991)

Medal record

Women's athletics

Representing Japan

Asian Indoor Athletics Championships
Gold medal – first place	2014 Huangzhou	Long jump

Yurina Hiraka (Japanese: 平加有梨奈; born June 4, 1991) is a Japanese long jumper. She has a personal best of 6.45 m (21 ft 1 3/4 in) for the event.

She began competing in the event as a teenager and cleared six metres for the first time in 2009. She began to make further improvements in the 2013 season. That year she was runner-up at the Hyogo Relays then won at the Mito International with a personal best of 6.43 m (21 ft 1 in). She also won at the Nanbu Memorial in Sapporo. She had her first national podium finish at the 2013 Japan Championships in Athletics, placing third behind Sachiko Masumi. She jumped 6.45 m (21 ft 1 3/4 in) to win the Japanese University title that September.

She gained her first international selection at the 2014 Asian Indoor Athletics Championships and won the gold medal in the long jump.
