= Lerma Gabito =

Filipino long jumper (born 1974)

Medal record

Women's athletics

Representing Philippines

Asian Championships
Silver medal – second place	2002 Colombo	Long jump
Bronze medal – third place	2003 Manila	Long jump

Lerma Elmira Bulauitan-Gabito (born 17 October 1974 in Peñablanca, Cagayan) is a Filipino long jumper. Her personal best jump is 6.56 metres, achieved in June 2004 in Colombo.

She won the silver medal at the 2001 Asian Championships, the bronze medal at the 2003 Asian Championships and finished sixth at the 2005 Asian Championships. She also competed at the Olympic Games in 2000 and 2004, as well as the World Championships in 2001 and 2003, without reaching the final.

She was the gold medallist in the long jump at the 2003 Southeast Asian Games.

== Competition record ==
Year	Competition	Venue	Position	Event	Notes
Representing the Philippines
1997	Southeast Asian Games	Jakarta, Indonesia	3rd	Long jump	6.26 m
1999	Southeast Asian Games	Bandar Seri Begawan, Brunei	3rd	Long jump	6.27 m
2000	Asian Championships	Jakarta, Indonesia	4th	Long jump	6.36 m
2000	Olympic Games	Sydney, Australia	59th (h)	100 m	12.08
2001	World Championships	Edmonton, Canada	35th (h)	100 m	11.87
2001	Southeast Asian Games	Kuala Lumpur, Malaysia	2nd	Long jump	6.43 m
2002	Asian Championships	Colombo, Sri Lanka	2nd	Long jump	6.40 m (w)
2002	Asian Games	Busan, South Korea	4th	Long jump	6.30 m
2003	World Championships	Paris, France	33rd (h)	100 m	11.99
2003	Asian Championships	Manila, Philippines	3rd	Long jump	6.50 m
2003	Afro-Asian Games	Hyderabad, India	2nd	Long jump	6.30 m
2003	Southeast Asian Games	Hanoi, Vietnam	1st	Long jump	6.21 m
2004	Olympic Games	Athens, Greece	33rd (q)	Long jump	6.31 m
2005	Asian Championships	Incheon, South Korea	6th	Long jump	6.40 m
2005	Southeast Asian Games	Manila, Philippines	2nd	Long jump	6.45 m
2006	Asian Games	Doha, Qatar	12th	Long jump	5.71 m
