= Shohei Oka =

Japanese middle-distance runner

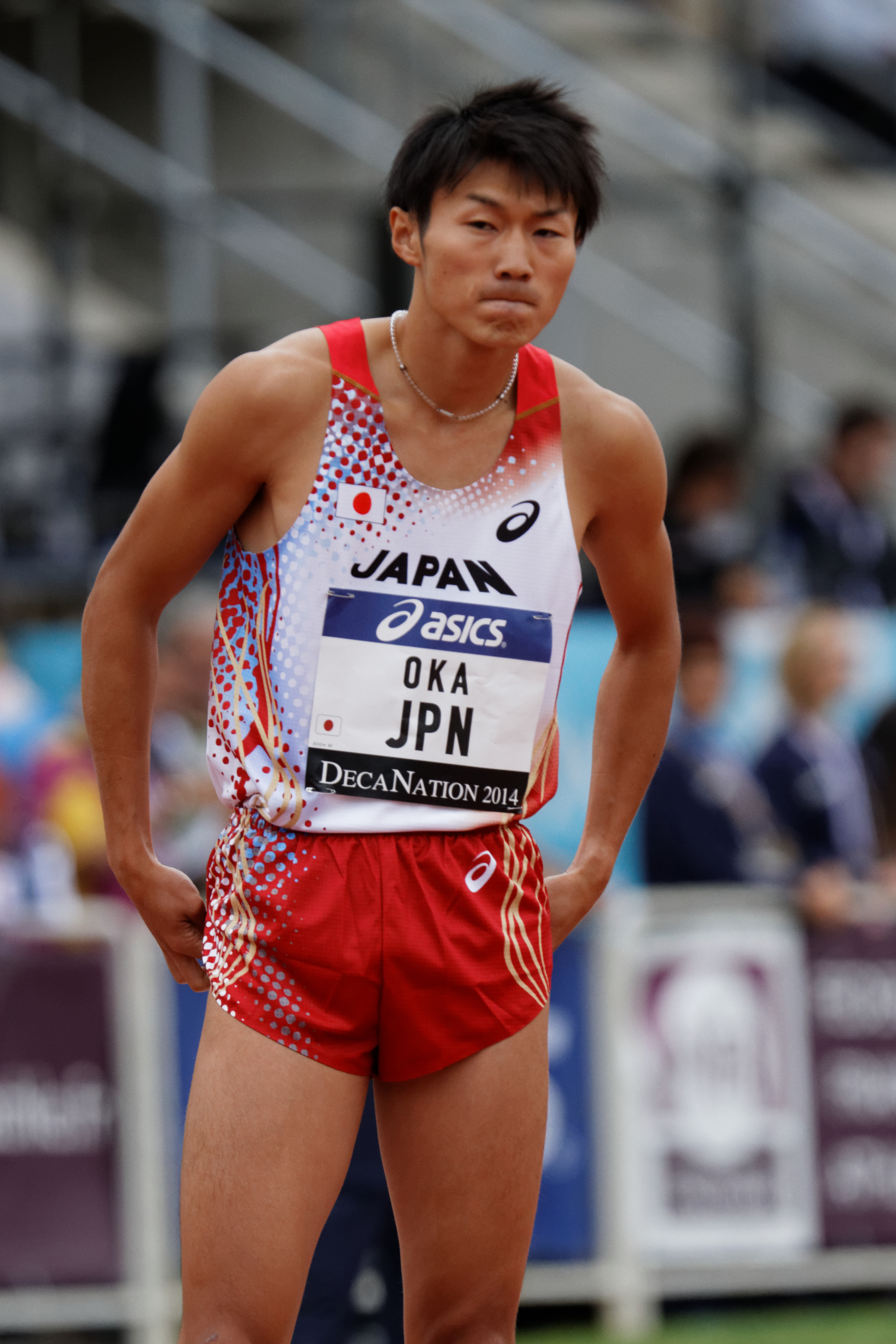
- Oka at the 2014 DécaNation

Personal information
- Nationality: Japanese
- Born: May 28, 1990 (age 36) Japan

Sport
- Sport: Track
- Event(s): 400 meters, 800 meters

Achievements and titles
- Personal best: 800 meters: 1:47.66
- Updated on 11-27-14

Shohei Oka (born 28 May 1990) is a Japanese middle-distance runner who specializes in the 800 meters. He competed for Japan at the 2014 DécaNation. Oka placed third overall in the men's 800 meters at the 2012 Japan Championships in Athletics. He trains with hometown club Wakayama Rikkyo in the Wakayama Prefecture.
