= Miyauchi (surname) =

Miyauchi (written: 宮内) is a Japanese surname. Notable people with the surname include:

- Atsushi Miyauchi (宮内 敦士, born 1969), Japanese actor and voice actor
- Hiroshi Miyauchi (宮内 洋, born 1947), Japanese actor
- Katsusuke Miyauchi (宮内 勝典, born 1944), Japanese writer and activist
- Kōhei Miyauchi (宮内 幸平, 1929–1995), Japanese actor and voice actor
- Masaru Miyauchi (宮内 優, born 1984), Japanese bobsledder
- Misumi Miyauchi (宮内 美澄, born 1971), Japanese tennis player
- Reina Miyauchi (宮内 玲奈, born 1978), Japanese singer
- Satoshi Miyauchi (宮内 聡, born 1959), Japanese footballer
- Takayuki Miyauchi (宮内 タカユキ, born 1955), Japanese singer
- Yoshihiko Miyauchi (宮内 義彦, born 1935), Japanese businessman
- Haruka Miyauchi (宮内 晴香, born 1993), Japanese singer in GWSN

== Fictional characters ==
- Renge Miyauchi (宮内 れんげ), a character in the manga series Non Non Biyori
- Suguri Miyauchi (宮内 すぐり), protagonist of the manga series Inubaka
