= Konomi Kai =

Japanese long jumper

Personal information
- Nationality: Japanese
- Born: 10 July 1993 (age 32) Kawagoe, Saitama, Japan
- Height: 1.53 m (5 ft 0 in)
- Weight: 50 kg (110 lb)

Sport
- Country: Japan
- Sport: Track and field
- Event: Long jump

Achievements and titles
- Personal best: 6.84 m (Konosu 2015)

Konomi Kai (甲斐 好美, Kai Konomi; born 10 July 1993 in Kawagoe, Saitama) is a Japanese track and field athlete who specialises in the long jump. She competed in the women's long jump at the 2016 Summer Olympics held in Rio de Janeiro, Brazil.

== Personal bests ==
=== Outdoor ===
Event	Record	Wind	Venue	Date
Long jump	6.84	+1.2	Konosu	24 October 2015

== International competition ==
Year	Competition	Venue	Position	Event	Performance (m)
Representing Japan
2015	Asian Championships	Wuhan, China	8th	Long jump	6.06 (wind: -0.3 m/s)
2016	World Indoor Championships	Portland, United States	—	Long jump	NM
2016	Olympics	Rio de Janeiro, Brazil	37th (q)	Long jump	5.87 (wind: +0.3 m/s)

== National titles ==
- Japanese Championships
  - Long jump: 2016
