= 2013 Japan Championships in Athletics =

97th Japan Championships in Athletics
- Dates: June 7–9
- Host city: Chōfu, Tokyo, Japan
- Venue: Ajinomoto Stadium
- Level: Senior
- Type: Outdoor
- Events: 36 (men: 18; women: 18)
- Records set: 3 (CR: 3)

The 97th Japan Championships in Athletics (第97回日本陸上競技選手権大会, Dai 97 kai Nihon Rikujō Kyōgi Sensyuken Taikai) were held at Ajinomoto Stadium in Chōfu. Organised by JAAF, the three-day competition took place from June 7–9 and served as the national championships in track and field for the Japan. The competition was for the qualifying trial for the Japan team at the 2013 World Championships.

During the competition, 3 new championship records were set in the events. Koji Murofushi won the hummer throw's national champions for nineteen consecutive years. For the Most Valuable Player of the Championships, Ryota Yamagata and Hitomi Niiya were selected.

The competition was broadcast on television by NHK.

== Medal summary ==
=== Men ===
Event	Gold		Silver		Bronze	
100 m (+0.7 m/s)	Ryota Yamagata	10.11	Yoshihide Kiryu	10.25	Kei Takase	10.28
200 m (+0.9 m/s)	Shota Iizuka	20.31	Yuichi Kobayashi	20.46	Kei Takase; Kenji Fujimitsu	20.48
400 m	Yuzo Kanemaru	45.56	Kengo Yamazaki	46.00	Hiroyuki Nakano	46.23
800 m	Sho Kawamoto	1:47.43	Masato Yokota	1:47.96	Takeshi Kuchino	1:48.72
1500 m	Yuki Akimoto	4:02.32	Yasunari Kusu	4:02.89	Tukasa Anzai	4:03.09
5000 m	Sota Hoshi	13:49.57	Tetsuya Yoroizaka	13:49.63	Yuichiro Ueno	13:51.13
10,000 m	Yuki Sato	28:24.94	Suguru Osako	28:25.84	Tsuyoshi Ugachi	28:27.00
110 m hurdles (+1.3 m/s)	Wataru Yazawa	13.59	Hiroyuki Sato	13.61	Yutaro Furukawa	13.66
400 m hurdles	Takayuki Kishimoto	49.08	Yasuhiro Fueki	49.31	Takatoshi Abe	49.57
3000 m steeplechase	Minato Yamashita	8:33.57	Aoi Matsumoto	8:33.82	Tsuyoshi Takeda	8:36.17
High jump	Hiromi Takahari	2.25 m	Takumi Tomiyama; Takashi Eto; Naoto Tobe	2.20 m	-	-
Pole vault	Seito Yamamoto	5.70 m	Daichi Sawano	5.60 m	Hiroki Ogita	5.50 m
Long jump	Yuhi Oiwa	7.76 m (+0.1 m/s)	Shinichiro Shimono	7.75 m (0.0 m/s)	Kota Minemura	7.52 m (+0.1 m/s)
Triple jump	Yohei Kajikawa	16.36 m (+1.3 m/s)	Yuma Okabe	16.30 m (+0.7 m/s)	Shoichi Matsushita	16.19 m (+0.8 m/s)
Shot put	Satoshi Hatase	18.30 m	Sotaro Yamada	17.89 m	Ikuhiro Miyauchi	17.76 m
Discus throw	Shigeo Hatakeyama	56.90 m	Yuji Tsutsumi	55.67 m	Shiro Kobayashi	53.93 m
Hammer throw	Koji Murofushi	76.42 m	Yuji Noguchi	70.11 m	Ryota Kashimura	67.07 m
Javelin throw	Yukifumi Murakami	81.04 m	Genki Dean	78.73 m	Yuya Koriki	77.84 m

=== Women ===
Event	Gold		Silver		Bronze	
100 m (0.0 m/s)	Chisato Fukushima	11.41	Mayumi Watanabe	11.62	Anna Doi; Saori Kitakaze	11.74
200 m (+0.5 m/s)	Chisato Fukushima	23.25	Mayumi Watanabe	24.02	Yuki Tamura	24.06
400 m	Haruka Sugiura	52.52 NJR	Sayaka Ooki	53.17	Sayaka Aoki	53.56
800 m	Miho Ito	2:05.30	Miho Nakata	2:05.38	Akari Kishikawa	2:06.01
1500 m	Ayako Jinnouchi	4:16.17	Chikako Mori	4:17.76	Maya Iino	4:18.08
5000 m	Misaki Onishi	15:21.73	Riko Matsuzaki	15:26.05	Shiho Takechi	15:29.85
10,000 m	Hitomi Niiya	31:06.67	Yuko Shimizu	32:16.58	Ayumi Hagiwara	32:17.17
100 m hurdles (-0.6 m/s)	Hitomi Shimura	13.02	Ayako Kimura	13.03	Airi Ito	13.27
400 m hurdles	Satomi Kubokura	56.62	Manami Kira	57.15	Sayaka Aoki	57.28
3000 m steeplechase	Yoshika Arai	9:58.22	Misato Horie	10:04.07	Misaki Sango	10:06.22
High jump	Miyuki Fukumoto	1.90 m	Yuki Mimura	1.75 m	Reina Kato; Hiromi Kanai	1.70 m
Pole vault	Kanae Tatsuta	4.10 m	Megumi Hamana	4.00 m	Megumi Nakada	4.00 m
Long jump	Saeko Okayama	6.59 m (-0.3 m/s)	Sachiko Masumi	6.54 m (+0.1 m/s)	Yurina Hiraka	6.32 m (0.0 m/s)
Triple jump	Fumiyo Yoshida	13.14 m (+1.7 m/s)	Mei Yamane	12.90 m (0.0 m/s)	Kaede Miyasaka	12.88 m (+0.7 m/s)
Shot put	Yukiko Shirai	15.65 m	Chihiro Shigeyama	15.29 m	Erina Fukutomi	15.08 m
Discus throw	Ai Shikimoto	52.86 m	Ayumi Takahashi	52.74 m	Marika Tokai	50.28 m
Hammer throw	Masumi Aya	64.20 m	Mika Takekawa	59.72 m	Wakana Sato	59.10 m
Javelin throw	Yuki Ebihara	60.41 m	Kiho Kuze	58.98 m NJR	Risa Miyashita	56.22 m

== Official Sponsor ==
- Yamazaki Baking (Special Sponsor)
- ASICS
- Otsuka Pharmaceutical
- Japan Airlines
- Nishi Sports
- Cerespo
- Keio Corporation (Special Offer)
