= 2007 Asian Athletics Championships – Women's long jump =

The women's long jump event at the 2007 Asian Athletics Championships was held in Amman, Jordan on July 27.

== Results ==
Rank	Name	Nationality	Result	Notes
1st place, gold medalist(s)	Olga Rypakova	Kazakhstan	6.66w	
2nd place, silver medalist(s)	Anju Bobby George	India	6.65	
3rd place, bronze medalist(s)	Chung Soon–Ok	South Korea	6.60w	
4	Sachiko Masumi	Japan	6.34w	
5	Liu Huahua	China	6.33w	
6	Rima Taha	Jordan	5.99	
7	Rahima Sardi	Kyrgyzstan	5.98w	
8	Ngew Sin Mei	Malaysia	5.94w	
9	Yang Peishan	Singapore	4.91w	
