= Yelena Koshcheyeva =

Kazakhstani long jumper (born 1973)

Personal information
- Born: 17 February 1973 (age 53) Taraz, Zhambyl Province, Kazakh SSR, Soviet Union

Sport
- Country: Kazakhstan
- Sport: Track and field
- Event: Long jump

Achievements and titles
- Personal best: Long jump: 6.76 m (1998)
Medal record
Women's athletics
Representing Kazakhstan
Asian Championships
Gold medal – first place	2002 Colombo	Long jump

Yelena Koshcheyeva (born 17 February 1973 in Taraz, Zhambyl Province) is a Kazakhstani long jumper.

Her most successful year was 2002, when she won a bronze medal at the Asian Games and a gold medal at the Asian Championships in Colombo. In 2004, she reached the long jump final at the Olympic Games, finishing eleventh. She also competed at the World Championships in 1999, 2001 and 2003 without ever reaching the final.

Her personal best is 6.76 metres, achieved in May 1998 in Bishkek.

== Competition record ==
Year	Competition	Venue	Position	Notes
Representing Kazakhstan
1996	Olympic Games	Atlanta, United States	36th (q)	5.55 m
1998	Asian Games	Bangkok, Thailand	8th	6.07 m
1999	World Championships	Seville, Spain	23rd (q)	6.40 m
2000	Olympic Games	Sydney, Australia	14th (q)	6.57 m
2001	World Championships	Edmonton, Canada	13th (q)	6.46 m
2002	Asian Championships	Colombo, Sri Lanka	1st	6.61 m
2002	Asian Games	Busan, South Korea	3rd	6.30 m
2003	World Championships	Paris, France	23rd (q)	6.13 m
2003	Asian Championships	Manila, Philippines	6th	6.23 m
2004	Olympic Games	Athens, Greece	11th	6.53 m
