= 2006 IAAF World Indoor Championships – Women's triple jump =

The Women's triple jump event at the 2006 IAAF World Indoor Championships was held on March 10–11.

== Medalists ==
Gold	Silver	Bronze
Tatyana Lebedeva; Russia	Anna Pyatykh; Russia	Yamilé Aldama; Sudan

== Results ==
=== Qualification ===
Qualifying perf. 14.15 (Q) or 8 best performers (q) advanced to the Final.

Rank	Group	Athlete	Nationality	#1	#2	#3	Result	Notes
1	A	Yargelis Savigne	Cuba	14.52			14.52	Q, PB
2	B	Yamilé Aldama	Sudan	13.38	14.40		14.40	Q
3	A	Tatyana Lebedeva	Russia	14.37			14.37	Q
4	B	Tereza Marinova	Bulgaria	14.27			14.27	Q
5	B	Anna Pyatykh	Russia	13.94	13.97	14.24	14.24	Q
6	B	Dana Veldáková	Slovakia	13.83	14.21		14.21	Q
7	A	Oleksandra Stadnyuk	Ukraine	13.95	14.19		14.19	Q
8	A	Trecia Smith	Jamaica	X	14.03	14.16	14.16	Q
9	A	Carlota Castrejana	Spain	X	14.14	X	14.14	SB
10	A	Keila Costa	Brazil	X	14.11	13.80	14.11	NR
11	A	Natallia Safronava	Belarus	13.72	13.97	14.00	14.00	
12	B	Mabel Gay	Cuba	12.68	13.93	13.84	13.93	
13	B	Kéné Ndoye	Senegal	13.81	13.88	X	13.88	SB
14	B	Xie Limei	China	13.75	13.47	13.66	13.75	
15	B	Mariana Solomon	Romania	13.73	13.50	13.71	13.73	
16	B	Simona La Mantia	Italy	12.96	13.49	13.61	13.61	
17	A	Anastasiya Juravleva	Uzbekistan	13.58	13.58	13.49	13.58	
18	A	Elena Parfenova	Kazakhstan	13.37	X	13.16	13.37	

=== Final ===
Rank	Athlete	Nationality	#1	#2	#3	#4	#5	#6	Result	Notes
1st place, gold medalist(s)	Tatyana Lebedeva	Russia	14.95	14.92	14.76	X	14.82	11.82	14.95	WL
2nd place, silver medalist(s)	Anna Pyatykh	Russia	14.66	14.45	14.68	14.64	X	14.93	14.93	PB
3rd place, bronze medalist(s)	Yamilé Aldama	Sudan	14.48	14.86	14.66	14.38	14.77	13.09	14.86	SB
4	Trecia Smith	Jamaica	X	14.78	14.84	X	X	X	14.84	NR
5	Yargelis Savigne	Cuba	14.52	14.72	14.54	13.23	14.28	14.52	14.72	PB
6	Tereza Marinova	Bulgaria	14.37	14.06	13.87	13.76	X	X	14.37	
7	Oleksandra Stadnyuk	Ukraine	13.47	X	14.34	14.04	13.85	13.94	14.34	PB
8	Dana Veldáková	Slovakia	13.24	X	13.76	13.76	13.47	13.47	13.76	
