= Oleksandra Stadnyuk =

Ukrainian athlete (born 1980)

Oleksandra Oleksandrivna Stadnyuk (Ukrainian: Олександра Олександрівна Стаднюк; born 16 April 1980 in Cherkassy) is a Ukrainian athlete who competes in the long jump and triple jump.

She finished seventh in triple jump at the 2006 IAAF World Indoor Championships in Moscow. Her personal best jump is 14.09 metres, achieved in June 2005 in Florence.

== Competition record ==
Year	Competition	Venue	Position	Event	Notes
Representing Ukraine
2005	World Championships	Helsinki, Finland	18th (q)	Long jump	6.35 m
2006	World Indoor Championships	Moscow, Russia	7th	Triple jump	14.34 m
2007	Universiade	Bangkok, Thailand	7th	Long jump	6.39 m
2007	Universiade	Bangkok, Thailand	5th	Triple jump	13.84 m
2007	World Championships	Osaka, Japan	20th (q)	Long jump	6.47 m
2008	Olympic Games	Beijing, China	33rd (q)	Long jump	6.19 m
