= Chen Yaling =

Chinese track and field athlete

Medal record

Women's athletics

Representing China

Asian Indoor Games
Gold medal – first place	2007 Macau	Long jump

Asian Championships
Silver medal – second place	2009 Guangzhou	Long jump

Asian Indoor Championships
Gold medal – first place	2008 Doha	Long jump
Silver medal – second place	2010 Tehran	Long jump

Chen Yaling (born 24 April 1984) is a Chinese track and field athlete who competes in the long jump. She represented China at the World Championships in Athletics in 2007 and has appeared twice at the Asian Games (2006, 2010).

She was the runner-up at the 2009 Asian Athletics Championships and has won gold medals at the Asian Indoor Athletics Championships, the Asian Indoor Games and the East Asian Games. A three-time Chinese national champion (2006, 2007 and 2009), she holds a personal best of 6.62 metres for the long jump.

== Career ==
Hailing from Anhui Province, she began long jumping at national level in 2002 and her first major competition was the 10th Chinese Games in 2005, where she ranked thirteenth. She set a personal best of 6.62 metres to win the Chinese Championships in Shijiazhuang in 2006, going on to place fourth behind Olga Rypakova at the 2006 Asian Games.

At the 2007 Chinese World Trials, Chen won with a season's best of 6.59 m to gain qualification into the 2007 World Championships in Athletics. On her global championship debut in Osaka, she finished ninth in the qualifying round. She took wins at the Chinese Championships and the Shanghai Golden Grand Prix that year, A jump of 6.45 m in November was enough to win the long jump gold medal at the 2007 Asian Indoor Games.

A few months later she added a second indoor title to her achievements, taking the long jump competition at the 2008 Asian Indoor Athletics Championships in Doha. Chen was the bronze medallist at the Good Luck Beijing test event, but did not go on to compete at the main competition at the 2008 Beijing Olympics. Her 2009 season began with an indoor personal best of 6.57 m on the Chinese circuit. She secured another national title outdoors in May and was one of the favourites for the 11th Chinese National Games. She ended up as the silver medallist at the Games, however, as 16-year-old Lu Minjia emerged with an Asian youth record mark to win the competition. Her year's best jump came in Jinan in October, clearing 6.58 m, but she did not manage to reach this form at the 2009 Asian Athletics Championships, where she had to settle for silver behind Filipino Marestella Torres.

She attempted a title defence at the 2009 Asian Indoor Games, but again she did not produce a strong performance and her jump of 6.27 m left her out of the medals in fourth place. Chen ended the year with a gold medal on the regional stage, defeating Japan's Saeko Okayama to win at the 2009 East Asian Games. She also competed at collegiate level that year, coming sixth at the 2009 Summer Universiade.

Chen failed to clear six metres at the 2010 Asian Indoor Athletics Championships, but this was still sufficient for a runner-up finish in a below-standard competition. She was the runner-up at the Chinese Nationals that year and her season's best jump was 6.48 m, achieved in Chongqing. She was selected to represent China at the 2010 Asian Games, but managed only tenth place in the women's long jump competition.
