= Marestella Torres-Sunang =

Filipino long jumper (born 1981)

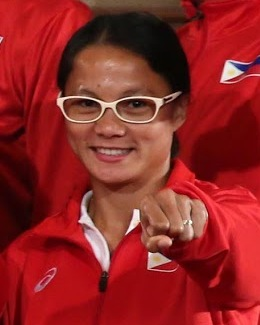
- Sunang in 2016

Personal information
- Nationality: Filipino
- Born: Marestella Renido Torres; February 20, 1981 (age 45) San Jose, Negros Oriental
- Height: 157 cm (5 ft 2 in) (1.57 m) (2015)
- Weight: 56 kg (123 lb) (2015)
- Spouse: Eliezer Sunang

Sport
- Country: Philippines
- Sport: Track and field
- Event: Long jump
- Retired: 2022

Achievements and titles
- Personal best: 6.72 m (2016)
Medal record
Women's Athletics
Representing Philippines
Event	1st	2nd	3rd
Asian Athletics Championships	1	1	1
Asian Beach Games	0	0	1
Southeast Asian Games	4	0	2
Total	5	1	4
Asian Championships
Gold medal – first place	2009 Guangdong	Long Jump
Silver medal – second place	2005 Incheon	Long Jump
Bronze medal – third place	2002 Colombo	Long Jump
Asian Beach Games
Bronze medal – third place	2016 Da Nang	Long Jump
Southeast Asian Games
Gold medal – first place	2005 Manila	Long Jump
Gold medal – first place	2007 Nakhon Ratchasima	Long Jump
Gold medal – first place	2009 Vientiane	Long Jump
Gold medal – first place	2011 Palembang	Long Jump
Bronze medal – third place	2015 Singapore	Long Jump
Bronze medal – third place	2017 Kuala Lumpur	Long Jump

Marestella "Mariz" Renido Torres-Sunang OLY (born February 20, 1981) is a Filipino long jumper.

== Career ==
Torres-Sunang started long jumping in 1994 in Negros Oriental. Her talent was recognized by her teachers but she often trained on a limited budget, doing jumps on rice husks rather than a proper sand pit.

Torres-Sunang finished fourth at the 2002 Asian Championships and won the silver medal at the 2005 Asian Championships. She also competed at the 2005 World Championships without reaching the final. She also participated in the 2008 Olympics in Beijing, China. In 2009, she surprisingly won the 2009 Asian Championships with a leap of 6.51 m.

Her personal best jump of 6.71 m, achieved at the 2011 Southeast Asian Games in Palembang, is currently the Southeast Asian Games Record.

Torres-Sunang finished 22nd of 32 at the 2012 London Olympic Games, failing to advance to the final.

On April 7, 2016, Torres-Sunang, who came from maternity with the help of her coach and sponsor James Michael Lafferty and nutritionist-wife Carol Lafferty, won the gold medal in the women's long jump event of the 2016 Ayala-PATAFA Philippine National Open Invitationals held at the Philsports Arena. She registered a 6.60 m jump in her 5th attempt, falling 10 centimeters short from the Olympic qualifying standard.

In May 2016, the International Association of Athletics Federations (IAAF) formally accepted the nomination made by the Philippine Athletics Track and Field Association (PATAFA) for the universality slot of Torres-Sunang in the 2016 Summer Olympics. However, the slot was junked after the inclusion of marathon runner Mary Joy Tabal in the Rio-bound Philippine delegation.

In July 2016, Torres-Sunang achieved the Olympic qualifying standard in the Women's Long Jump in the Kazakhstan Open and setting a new national record of 6.72 meters, thus making it into the Rio Olympics. This would be the third straight and the final Olympic appearance for the Filipina long jumper, who is the most senior member of the national contingent.

== Personal life ==
She is married to a fellow Filipino athlete, shot putter Eliezer Sunang with who she has a son.

== Personal bests ==
(Outdoor)

- Long Jump : 6.72 m (+0.8 m/s) – Kazakhstan Open, Almaty, Kazakhstan, 4 July 2016
- Triple Jump : 12.67 m – Manila, Philippines, 3 June 2004
- 100 Meters: 12.44 – 2007 World Championships, Osaka, Japan. 26 August 2007

(Indoor)

- Long Jump : 6.06 m – Aspire Dome, Doha, 13 March 2010

== International competitions ==
Year	Competition	Venue	Position	Event	Notes
Representing Philippines
2002	Asian Athletics Championships	Colombo, Sri Lanka	3rd	Long Jump	6.40 m
2002	Asian Games	Busan, South Korea	6th	Long Jump	6.08 m
2003	Asian Athletics Championships	Manila, Philippines	4th	Long Jump	6.34 m SB
2003	Afro-Asian Games	Hyderabad, India	5th	Long jump	6.29 m
2005	World Championships	Helsinki, Finland	15th	Long Jump	6.46 m
2005	Asian Athletics Championships	Incheon, South Korea	2nd	Long Jump	6.63 m
2005	Southeast Asian Games	Manila, Philippines	1st	Long Jump	6.47 m
2006	Asian Games	Doha, Qatar	6th	Long Jump	6.25 m +0.2
2007	Southeast Asian Games	Nakhon Ratchasima, Thailand	1st	Long Jump	6.31 m
2008	Olympic Games	Beijing, China	34th	Long jump	6.17 m +0.8
2009	Vietnam Open	Hanoi, Vietnam	1st	Long Jump	6.45 m
2009	World Championships	Berlin, Germany	29th	Long Jump	6.22 m
2009	Asian Athletics Championships	Guangzhou, China	1st	Long Jump	6.51 m
2009	Southeast Asian Games	Vientiane, Laos	1st	Long Jump	6.68 m
2010	Asian Games	Guangzhou, China	4th	Long Jump	6.49 m +1.1
2011	World Championships	Daegu, South Korea	21st	Long Jump	6.31 m
2011	Asian Athletics Championships	Kobe, Japan	5th	Long Jump	6.34 m
2011	Southeast Asian Games	Palembang, Indonesia	1st	Long Jump	6.71 m NR
2012	Bangkok Asian Grand Prix	Bangkok, Thailand	3rd	Long Jump	6.37 m
2012	Olympic Games	London, United Kingdom	22nd	Long jump	6.22 m
2014	Asian Games	Incheon, South Korea	-	Long Jump	NM
2015	Southeast Asian Games	Kallang, Singapore	3rd	Long Jump	6.41 m
2016	Olympic Games	Rio de Janeiro, Brazil	28th	Long jump	6.22 m
2016	Asian Beach Games	Danang, Vietnam	3rd	Long jump	6.22 m
2016	Asian Indoor Athletics Championships	Doha, Qatar	8th	Long jump	6.03 m
2017	Asian Athletics Championships	Bhubaneswar, India	5th	Long Jump	6.20 m
2017	Southeast Asian Games	Kuala Lumpur, Malaysia	3rd	Long Jump	6.45 m
2018	Asian Games	Jakarta, Indonesia	9th	Long Jump	6.15 m
2019	Southeast Asian Games Test Event	Tarlac, Philippines	1st	Long Jump	6.20 m
2019	Southeast Asian Games	Tarlac, Philippines	4th	Long Jump	6.16 m
2021	Southeast Asian Games	Hanoi, Vietnam	7th	Long Jump	5.92 m
