= Miyauchi Station =

Miyauchi Station is the name of multiple train stations in Japan.

- Miyauchi Station (Hiroshima) in Hiroshima Prefecture
- Miyauchi Station (Niigata) in Niigata Prefecture
- Miyauchi Station (Yamagata) in Yamagata Prefecture
