= Masaru Miyauchi =

Japanese bobsledder (born 1984)

Masaru Miyauchi (宮内 優, Miyauchi Masaru; born June 13, 1984 in Otofuke, Hokkaido) is a Japanese bobsledder who has competed since 2009. He finished 21st in the four-man event at the 2010 Winter Olympics in Vancouver.

Miyauchi's best World Cup finish was 25th in a four-man event at Park City, Utah in November 2009.
