= Elena Bobrovskaya =

Kyrgyzstani athlete (born 1975)

Personal information
- Born: 11 April 1975 (age 51)

Sport
- Sport: Track and field
Medal record
Representing Kyrgyzstan
Asian Championships
Gold medal – first place	2000 Jakarta	Long jump

Elena Bobrovskaya (born 11 April 1975) is a retired Kyrgyzstani athlete who specialized in the 100 metres and long jump.

As a sprinter she competed at the World Indoor Championships in 1997, 1999, 2001 and 2004 as well as the 2004 Olympic Games, but without reaching the final. Her personal best time was 11.35 seconds, achieved in July 2004 in Bishkek. She also had 23.35 seconds in the 200 metres, achieved in May 2004 in Tashkent.

As a long jumper she competed at the World Championships in 1999 and 2001 as well as the 2000 Olympic Games, but again without reaching the final. Her personal best jump was 6.73 metres, achieved in June 2001 in Almaty. She also had 13.14 metres in the triple jump, achieved in May 2000 in Almaty.
