= Jung Soon-ok =

South Korean long jumper

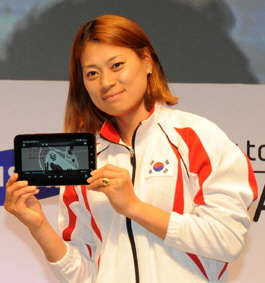

Korean name
- Hangul: 정순옥
- RR: Jeong Sunok
- MR: Chŏng Sunok

Jung Soon-ok
Medal record

Women's athletics

Representing South Korea

Asian Championships
Silver medal – second place	2015 Wuhan	Long jump
Bronze medal – third place	2007 Amman	Long jump

Jung Soon-ok (born 23 April 1983) is a South Korean long jumper.

She finished fifth at the 2006 Asian Games. She also competed at the 2007 World Championships and the 2008 Olympic Games without reaching the final.

Her personal best jump is 6.76 metres, achieved in June 2009 in Daegu.

== Achievements ==
Year	Competition	Venue	Position	Event	Notes
Representing South Korea
2001	Asian Junior Championships	Bandar Seri Begawan, Brunei	2nd	Long jump	5.84 m
2002	World Junior Championships	Kingston, Jamaica	19th (q)	Long jump	5.89 m
2003	Universiade	Daegu, South Korea	15th (q)	Long jump	5.96 m
2005	Universiade	İzmir, Turkey	17th (q)	Long jump	6.08 m
2005	Asian Championships	Incheon, Korea	9th	Long jump	6.33 m
2005	East Asian Games	Macau	2nd	Long jump	6.31 m
2006	Asian Games	Doha, Qatar	5th	Long jump	6.26 m
2007	Asian Championships	Amman, Jordan	3rd	Long jump	6.60 m (w)
2007	Universiade	Bangkok, Thailand	4th	Long jump	6.50 m
2007	World Championships	Osaka, Japan	22nd (q)	Long jump	6.45 m
2008	Olympic Games	Beijing, China	28th (q)	Long jump	6.33 m
2009	World Championships	Berlin, Germany	14th (q)	Long jump	6.49 m
2010	Asian Games	Guangzhou, China	1st	Long jump	6.53 m
2011	Asian Championships	Kobe, Japan	10th	Long jump	6.12 m
2011	World Championships	Daegu, South Korea	29th (q)	Long jump	6.18 m
2013	Asian Championships	Pune, India	7th	Long jump	6.02 m (w)
2014	Asian Games	Incheon, South Korea	4th	Long jump	6.34 m
2015	Asian Championships	Wuhan, China	2nd	Long jump	6.47 m
