= Darya Reznichenko =

Uzbekistani long jumper

Personal information
- Nationality: Uzbekistan
- Born: 3 April 1991 (age 35) Tashkent, Uzbekistan

Sport
- Sport: Track and Field
- Event: Long jump
Medal record
Women's athletics
Representing Uzbekistan
Asian Indoor Championships
Silver medal – second place	2014 Hangzhou	Long jump
Bronze medal – third place	2023 Astana	Long jump

Darya Rustamovna Reznichenko (born 3 April 1991) is an Uzbekistani Olympic long jumper.

In June 2021 in Bishkek (Kyrgyzstan) at the international competition for the prizes of the Olympic champion - Tatyana Kolpakova, she showed a result of 6.83 m, thus she managed to fulfill the standard of the Summer Olympic Games 2020 (6.82 m).

She took part in the Athletics at the 2020 Summer Olympics – Women's long jump.

== Doping ==
She received a four-year suspension from December 2015 after testing positive for testosterone and oxandrolone in an out of competition test in Spała, Poland.
