= M. A. Prajusha =

Indian athlete

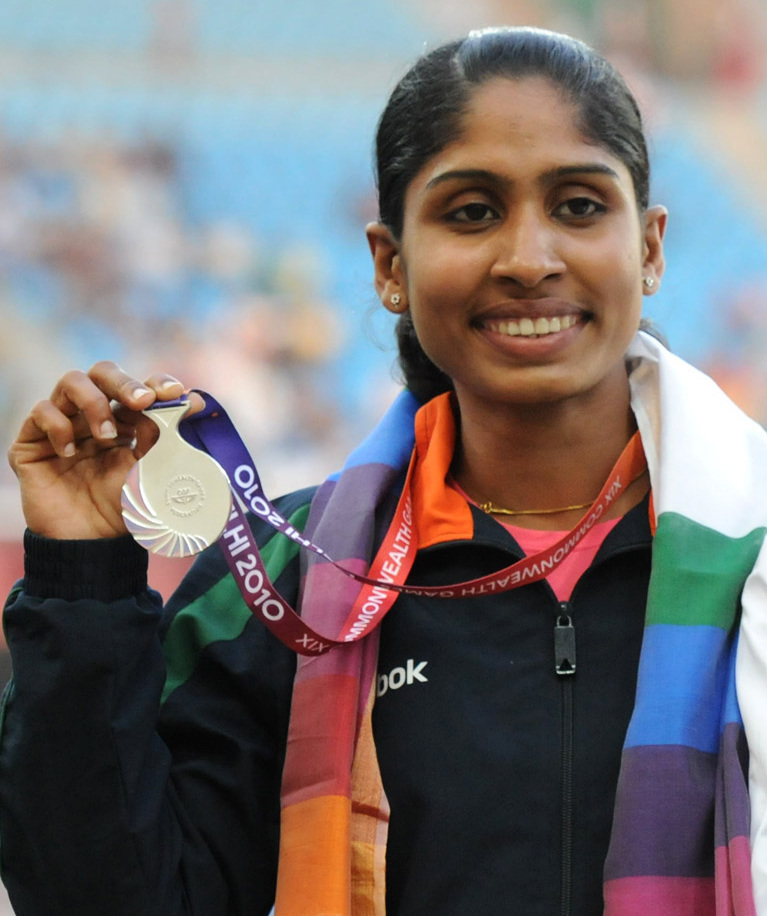
- Portrait of M. A. Prajushaat at Commonwealth Games in 2010

Personal information
- Full name: Maliakkal A. Prajusha
- Nationality: Indian
- Born: 20 May 1987 (age 39) Ambazhakad, Thrissur, Kerala, India

Sport
- Country: India
- Sport: Track and field
- Events: Long jump Triple jump

Achievements and titles
- Personal bests: Triple jump: 13.72 m (2010, Indian record); Long jump: 6.55 m (2010)
Medal record
Women's athletics
Representing India
Asian Indoor Championships
Bronze medal – third place	2008 Doha	Long jump
- Updated on 9 October 2010

Maliakhal Anthony Prajusha (born 20 May 1987) is an Indian track and field athlete from Kerala who competes in long jump and triple jump. She held the Indian National record for triple jump with a mark of 13.72 m. She broke the record held by Mayookha Johny by four centimeters.

== Early life ==
Prajusha was born on 20 May 1987 in Thrissur, a district in Kerala state, India.

== Career ==
Prajusha's personal best for triple jump is 13.72 m, an Indian National record set during the 2010 Commonwealth Games on 8 October 2010. She broke Mayookha Johny's two-month-old record by four centimeters while improving her personal best by a massive 18 cm (7 in).

Her personal best for long jump is 6.55 m set in Bangalore on 5 June 2010 during the second Indian Grand Prix.

Prajusha has been training under the Sports Authority Of India (SAI) for the last 10 years with her coach, M.A. George. She works with Indian Railways and trains under M.A. George, a coach at the Sports Authority of India.

== Awards ==
In 2010, Prajusha became the fourth Indian woman to complete a long jump longer than 6.50 meters, joining Anju Bobby George (6.83 m), J. J. Shobha (6.66 m), and Pramila Aiyappa. She won the gold medal for her effort. At 2010 Commonwealth Games, Prajusha won a silver medal in the women's long jump of the track and field event in Delhi.
