= Saeko Okayama =

Japanese long jumper (born 1982)

Personal information
- Nationality: Japanese
- Born: 12 April 1982 (age 44) Hiroshima Prefecture, Japan
- Education: Waseda University
- Height: 1.80 m (5 ft 11 in)
- Weight: 63 kg (139 lb)

Sport
- Country: Japan
- Sport: Track and field
- Event: Long jump

Achievements and titles
- Personal best(s): 100 m: 11.67 s (2012) 200 m: 24.23 s (2013) Long jump: 6.59 m (2013)
Medal record
Women's athletics
Representing Japan
Asian Championships
Bronze medal – third place	2011 Kobe	Long jump
East Asian Games
Silver medal – second place	2009 Hong Kong	Long jump

Saeko Okayama (岡山 沙英子, Okayama Saeko; born 12 April 1982 in Hiroshima Prefecture) is a Japanese long jumper. She holds a personal best jump of 6.59 metres. She was a bronze medalist at the 2011 Asian Championships and a three-time national champion at the Japanese Championships.

Her mother Emiko Koumaru is also a former Long jumper, having competed at the 1964 Summer Olympics in Tokyo. She was also the 1966 Japanese Championships champion and former Japanese record holder.

== Personal bests ==
Event	Performance	Competition	Venue	Date	Notes
100 m	11.67 s (wind: +2.0 m/s)	Hiroshima Championships	Hiroshima, Japan	23 June 2012	
100 m	11.60 s (wind: +2.7 m/s)	Hiroshima Championships	Hiroshima, Japan	23 June 2012	Wind-assisted
200 m	24.23 s (wind: +2.0 m/s)	Beach Classic	Norwalk, United States	2 March 2013	
Long jump	6.59 m (wind: -0.3 m/s)	Japanese Championships	Chōfu, Japan	7 June 2013	
Long jump	6.67 m (wind: +4.1 m/s)	Golden Grand Prix	Kawasaki, Japan	6 May 2012	Wind-assisted

== International competition ==
Year	Competition	Venue	Position	Event	Performance
Representing Japan
1999	World Youth Championships	Bydgoszcz, Poland	5th	4×100 m relay	46.51 s (relay leg: 4th)
1999	World Youth Championships	Bydgoszcz, Poland	7th	Long jump	5.86 m (wind: -0.7 m/s)
2000	World Junior Championships	Santiago, Chile	22nd	100 m	12.22 s (wind: +0.3 m/s)
2009	East Asian Games	Hong Kong, China	2nd	Long jump	6.28 m (wind: +0.1 m/s)
2011	Asian Championships	Kobe, Japan	3rd	Long jump	6.51 m (wind: +0.2 m/s)
2013	Asian Championships	Pune, India	4th	Long jump	6.27 m (wind: -0.7 m/s)
2015	DécaNation	Paris, France	5th	Long jump	6.06 m (wind: 0.0 m/s)

== National titles ==
- National Championships
  - Long jump: 2012, 2013, 2015
- National Sports Festival
  - 100 m: 1999 (U19)
  - Long jump: 1999 (U19), 2010, 2011, 2015
- National Corporate Championships
  - Long jump: 2007
- National High School Championships
  - Long jump: 2000
