= Maho Hanaoka =

Japanese long and triple jumper

Personal information
- Born: 3 August 1976 (age 50) Funabashi, Chiba, Japan

Sport
- Sport: Track and field
Medal record
Representing Japan
Asian Games
Silver medal – second place	2002 Busan	Long jump
Asian Athletics Championships
Bronze medal – third place	1998 Fukuoka	Triple jump
Bronze medal – third place	2000 Jakarta	Long jump
Bronze medal – third place	2000 Jakarta	Triple jump
Asian Indoor Championships
Gold medal – first place	2006 Pattaya	Long jump
East Asian Games
Silver medal – second place	2001 Osaka	Triple jump
Bronze medal – third place	2001 Osaka	Long jump

Maho Hanaoka (Japanese: 花岡 麻帆; born 3 August 1976) is a Japanese former track and field athlete who competed mainly in the long jump and triple jump. She is one of Japan's best female athletes in the horizontal jumps: she holds the Japanese records for the triple jump outdoors with 14.04 m (46 ft 3/4 in) and is also the record holder in both the long and triple jump indoors. Her long jump best of 6.82 m (22 ft 4 1/2 in) is a former Japanese record, second to Kumiko Ikeda.

Her greatest international performance was a long jump gold medal at the 2006 Asian Indoor Athletics Championships, where she set a championship record. She was the long jump runner-up at the 2002 Asian Games and a three-time bronze medallist at the Asian Athletics Championships. She won medal in both jumps at the 2001 East Asian Games.

At the global level Hanaoka represented Japan at the 2004 Olympic Games, the 2001 World Championships in Athletics, twice at the IAAF World Indoor Championships (1999 and 2006), and twice at the Summer Universiade (1995 and 1999). At national level she was a five-time Japanese long jump champion and won five triple jump national titles. In her career she won seven times in the jumps at the National Sports Festival of Japan.

== Career ==
=== Early life ===
Born in Komuro, Funabashi, Chiba Prefecture, she attended high school in Narita, Chiba and later went on to study at Juntendo University. She began competing in long jump and triple jump as a teenager and by 1994 she had cleared six metres and twelve metres in the events, respectively. She won her first national title at the Japan Championships in Athletics at the age of seventeen, taking the long jump crown. Hanaoka made her international debut later that year and placed eighth at the 1994 Asian Games. She represented Japan at the 1995 Universiade, but it was not until 1997 that she placed among the top athletes nationally, coming second in the triple jump and fourth in the long jump. At the National Sports Festival of Japan, she won her first triple title with a jump of 12.72 m (41 ft 8 3/4 in).

=== Triple and long jump medals ===
Hanaoka was second to Seiko Nishiuchi at the 1998 Japanese Championships, but she was still selected to compete internationally after clearing a Japanese record of 13.69 m (44 ft 10 3/4 in). At the 1998 Asian Games she was seventh and the 1998 Asian Athletics Championships saw her win her first medal for Japan, a bronze with her jump of 13.24 m (43 ft 5 1/4 in). After an indoor national record of 13.27 m (43 ft 6 1/4 in) in February, she made her global senior debut at the 1999 IAAF World Indoor Championships, but finished in last place in the triple jump. She was ninth in the long jump at the 1999 Universiade, but did not get past the qualifiers of the triple jump. She greatly improved her personal best at the national championships that year, setting a national record of 14.04 m (46 ft 3/4 in). She was also the triple jump champion at the 1999 National Games.

Hanaoka set a personal best in the long jump at the 2000 Asian Athletics Championships, clearing a national record of 6.61 m (21 ft 8 in), and she was the bronze medallist in both the horizontal jumps at the competition. At national level she won the double at the Japanese Championships and also the long jump at the Japan National Games. She won the bronze medal in the long jump and the silver medal in the triple jump at the 2001 East Asian Games. For the second time in her career she broke a national record to win at the Japanese Championships, this time in the long jump with a mark of 6.82 m (22 ft 4 1/2 in). She defended her national long jump title but was runner-up to Kumiko Ikeda at the National Games. The 2001 World Championships in Athletics was her first global outdoor selection, but she did not get past the long jump heats. She took a third straight jumps double at the 2002 Japanese Championships and won the National Games triple jump title as well. The 2002 Asian Games was her biggest meet that year and she came away with the long jump silver medal (behind India's Anju Bobby George) and came fifth in the triple jump.

In 2003, she set a national indoor long jump record of 6.57 m (21 ft 6 1/2 in) as well as a 200 metres personal best of 23.91 seconds. She won a third straight triple jump title at the National Games and was the long jump winner at the Oda Memorial and Japanese Corporate Track and Field Championships. She came away with no titles at the National Championships, where she was second to Ikeda in the long jump. Her 2004 opened with a 100 metres best of 11.72 seconds and she ranked first in both jumps at that year's national championships. This earned Hanaoka her debut performance at the 2004 Athens Olympics, where she placed 33rd in the qualifying stage. A knee injury forced her to change her focus to just the long jump after 2004, as her body struggled with higher impact of the triple jump event.

=== Focus on long jump ===
At the 2005 Japanese Championships she had the second best long jump performance of her career with a clearance of 6.69 m (21 ft 11 1/4 in). Her rival Kumiko Ikeda matched this, however, and Hanaoka was runner-up by merit of a lesser second jump. Both represented Japan at the 2005 Asian Athletics Championships, but while Ikeda reached the podium Hanaoka managed only eighth place. She did win the National Games title that year.

The first international gold medal of her career came at the 2006 Asian Indoor Athletics Championships as she beat India's Bobby George in the long jump with a championship record of 6.40 m (20 ft 11 3/4 in). This led to her selection for the 2006 IAAF World Indoor Championships, where she competed in the qualifying round only. She was again bested at the national championships by Ikeda (who broke Hanaoka's long jump national record that season), but won at the National Games. Her third international outing of the year was the 2006 Asian Games and she came seventh, while Ikeda won the gold medal.

She competed sparingly from 2007 onwards, failing to reach the top ten at the Japanese Championships after that point. She was runner-up at the Japanese National Games in 2008, 2009 and 2010 – the latter was her final year of top level athletic competition.

== Personal bests ==
- 100 metres – 11.72 seconds
- 200 metres – 23.91 seconds
- Long jump – 6.82 metres (former national record)
- Triple jump – 14.04 metres NR
- Long jump indoor – 6.57 metres NR
- Triple jump indoor – 13.27 metres NR

== Competition record ==
National titles

- Long jump (5): 1994, 2000, 2001, 2002, 2004
- Triple jump (5): 1999, 2000, 2001, 2002, 2004
