= Anju Bobby George =

Indian athlete (born 1977)

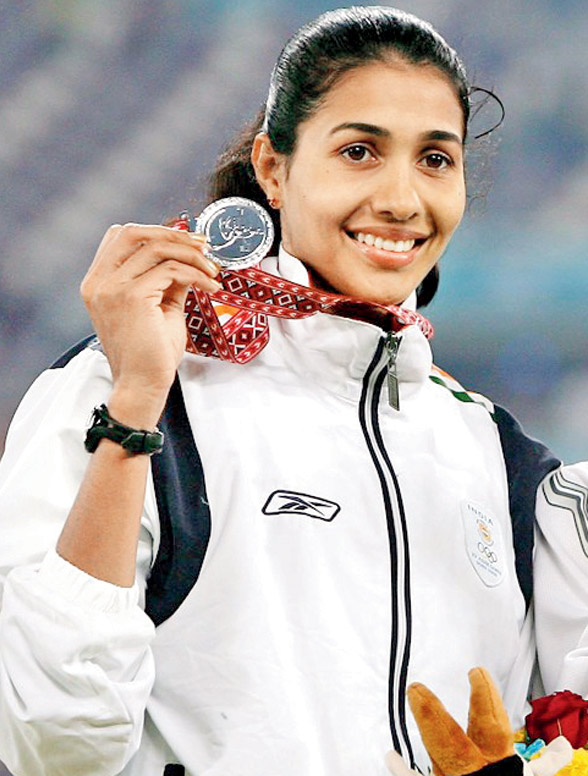
- Anju at the 2006 Asian Games

Personal information
- Born: Anju Markose; 19 April 1977 (age 49) Changanassery, Kerala, India
- Height: 1.82 m (6 ft 0 in)

Sport
- Sport: Track and field
- Event: Long jump

Achievements and titles
- Personal bests: Long jump: 6.83 m (Athens, 2004) NR; Triple jump: 13.67 (Hyderabad, 2002)
Medal record
Women's long jump
Representing India
World Championships
| Bronze medal – third place | 2003 Paris | Long jump |
World Athletics Final
| Gold medal – first place | 2005 Monte Carlo | Long jump |
Commonwealth Games
| Bronze medal – third place | 2002 Manchester | Long jump |
Asian Games
| Gold medal – first place | 2002 Busan | Long jump |
| Silver medal – second place | 2006 Doha | Long jump |
Asian Championships
| Gold medal – first place | 2005 Incheon | Long jump |
| Silver medal – second place | 2007 Amman | Long jump |
Asian Indoor Championships
| Silver medal – second place | 2006 Pattaya | Long jump |
| Silver medal – second place | 2008 Doha | Long jump |
South Asian Games
| Gold medal – first place | 2006 Colombo | Long jump |

Anju Bobby George (born 19 April 1977) is an Indian former long jumper. She made history when she won the bronze medal in long jump at the 2003 World Championships. With this achievement, she became the first Indian athlete ever to win a medal at the World Championships jumping 6.70 metres (22.0 ft). She went on to win the gold medal at the World Athletics Final in 2005, a performance she considers her best.

Anju was upgraded to the gold status from silver in the 2005 World Athletics Final following the disqualification of Tatyana Kotova of Russia by the World Athletics, after the re-testing of the latter's sample collected at the 2005 World Championship. She was awarded the Arjuna Award in 2002, Khel Ratna in 2003 and Padma Shri in 2004. She finished 5th position with a personal best of 6.83 metres (22.4 ft) at the 2004 Athens Olympics. In March 2021, she won the BBC lifetime achievement award for best athlete in India. She is the current Senior Vice President of Athletics Federation of India.

== Early life ==
Anju was born into the Kochuparambil family in the village of Cheeranchira near Changanassery town, Kottayam, Kerala to Syrian Orthodox Christian K. T. Markose.

== Professional career ==
Anju made history when she won the bronze medal clearing 6.70 m in Long Jump at the 2003 World Championships in Athletics in Paris, becoming the first Indian athlete ever to win a medal in a World Championships in Athletics. She also won a gold medal at the 2003 Afro-Asian Games. She achieved her personal best of 6.83 m at the 2004 Olympic Games at Athens which brought her the fifth position. This is the current Indian national record.

She received the Arjuna award in 2002–2003 for eminent sportspersons from the government of India and the country's highest sporting honour, Rajiv Gandhi Khel Ratna award in 2003–2004 after her success in the World Athletic meet. She was conferred Padma Shri, India's fourth highest civilian award in 2004.

Anju Bobby George pulled out of the 52nd national inter-state athletics in Hyderabad, due to an upper respiratory tract infection.

== Personal life ==
Anju is married to Robert Bobby George, who is a former national champion in triple jump and her former coach. She is employed with the Customs department in Bangalore. The couple has a son Aaron and a daughter Andrea.

== Sports associations ==
Anju was appointed as president of the Kerala State Sports Council (KSSC). She resigned from the post on 22 June 2016. She is the vice president of the Athletics Federation of India.

== See also ==
- India at the 2008 Summer Olympics
- List of Indian records in athletics
- List of Indian sportswomen
- List of Kerala Olympians
