= Mayookha Johny =

Indian athlete (born 1988)

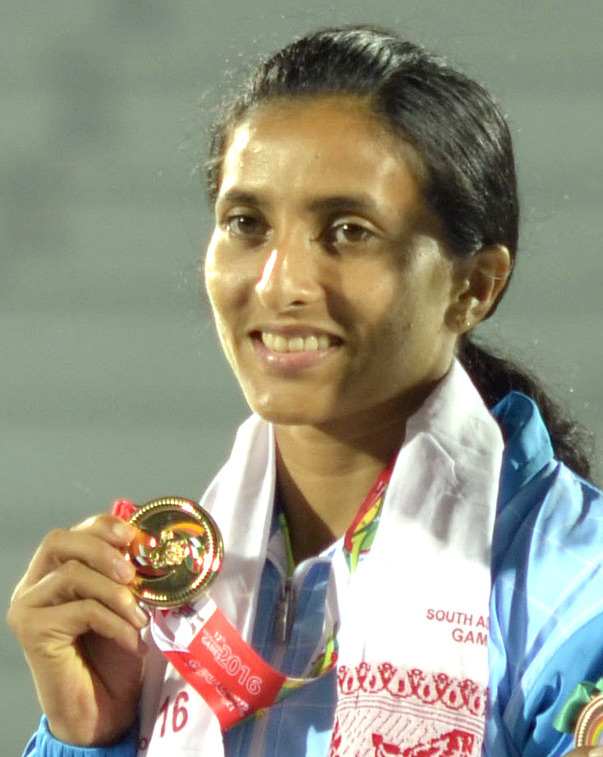
- Mayookha at the 2016 South Asian Games

Personal information
- Full name: Mayookha Johny Mathalikunnel
- Born: 4 September 1988 (age 38) Bombay, Maharashtra, India
- Height: 1.70 m (5 ft 7 in)

Sport
- Sport: Athletics
- Events: Long jump, Triple jump

Achievements and titles
- Personal bests: Long jump: 6.64 m (2010); Triple jump: 14.11 m NR (2011)
Medal record
Women's athletics
Representing India
Asian Championships
Gold medal – first place	2011 Kobe	Long jump
Bronze medal – third place	2011 Kobe	Triple jump
Bronze medal – third place	2013 Pune	Long jump
Asian Indoor Championships
Gold medal – first place	2016 Doha	Long jump
Silver medal – second place	2016 Doha	Triple jump
South Asian Games
Gold medal – first place	2016 Guwahati	Long jump
Gold medal – first place	2016 Guwahati	Triple jump

Mayookha Johny Mathalikunnel (born 9 April 1988) is an Indian former track and field athlete who specialized in long jump and triple jump. She is the first Indian woman to cross the fourteen-metre mark in triple jump and holds the current national record of 14.11 m set at the 2011 Asian Championships. Mayookha represented India in the women's triple jump event at the 2012 London Olympics.

== Early life ==
Mayookha was born on 4 September 1988 in Bombay, Maharashtra to parents originally from Koorachundu in Kerala. Her father M. Devassya Johny was a bodybuilder and a former Mr. Bombay.

== Career ==
Competing for Kannur in the 50th Kerala State Athletic Championship at Thrissur, Mayookha won gold in long jump and triple jump (12.38 m) in under-20 category in 2006. In the triple jump event she beat the more experienced M.A. Prajusha and Tincy Mathew.

She finished seventh in the long jump at the 2010 Asian Games. Johny fared better at the 2011 National Games of India the following February, taking a long and triple jump double ahead of M. A. Prajusha. Triple Jumper Mayookha Johny has become the first Indian woman to breach the 14-metre mark as she won a bronze medal in the third and final leg of the Asian Athletics Grand Prix in Wujiang.

At the 2011 World Championships in Daegu she qualified for the finals in the women's long jump event, thereby becoming only the third Indian ever to qualify for the final of an individual event in World Championships. She finished 9th with a best jump of 6.37 m, far behind her qualifying round performance where she recorded 6.53 m.

On 22 July 2012, Mayookha Johny triple jumped 13.91 m to win the top place in an athletics meet in Dillingen. She competed at the 2012 London Olympics in the triple jump event where she finished 22nd with a jump of 13.77 m. She competed at the 2014 Commonwealth Games in the long jump.
