= Yao Weili =

Chinese long jumper (born 1968)

Medal record

Women's athletics

Representing China

Asian Championships
Gold medal – first place	1993 Manila	Long jump
Silver medal – second place	1995 Jakarta	Long jump

Yao Weili (born 6 May 1968) is a retired Chinese long jumper.

Her personal best jump was 7.01 metres, achieved in June 1993 in Jinan.

== International competitions ==
Year	Competition	Venue	Position	Notes
1993	Asian Championships	Manila, Philippines	1st	
1994	Asian Games	Hiroshima, Japan	1st	6.91 CR
1995	Asian Championships	Jakarta, Indonesia	2nd	
