= Kumiko Ikeda =

Japanese long jumper (born 1981)

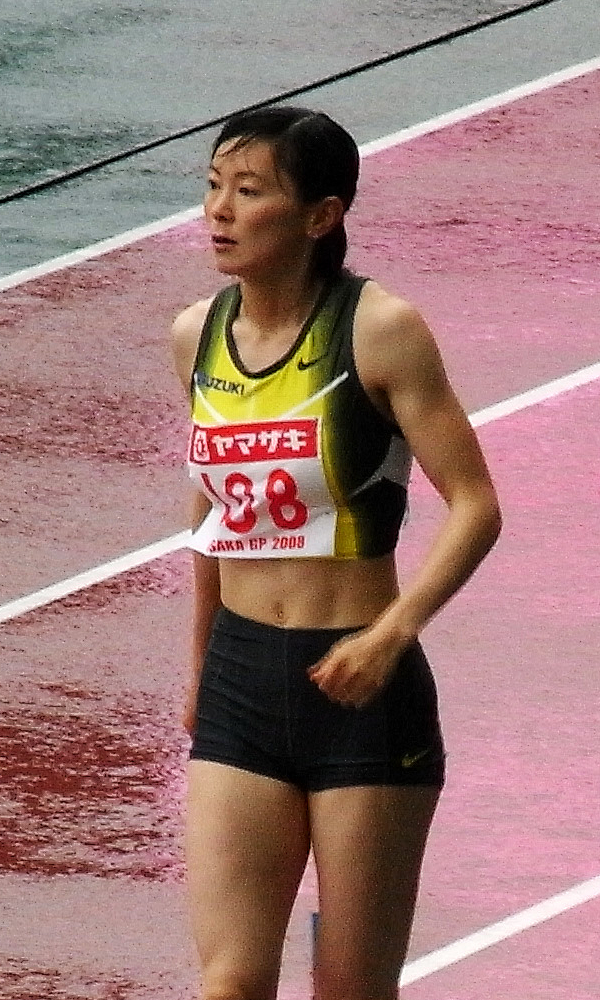
- Kumiko Ikeda on May 10, 2008

Medal record

Women's athletics

Representing Japan

Asian Championships
Bronze medal – third place	2005 Incheon	100 m hurdles
Bronze medal – third place	2005 Incheon	Long jump

Kumiko Imura (井村 久美子, Imura Kumiko; born 10 January 1981 in Sakata, Yamagata) is a Japanese long jumper.

She won bronze medals at the 2000 World Junior Championships and the 2001 Summer Universiade, and finished eleventh at the 2001 World Championships. On the regional level she won a bronze medal at the 2005 Asian Championships and gold at the 2006 Asian Games.

Her personal best jump is 6.86 metres, achieved in May 2006 in Osaka. This is the current Japanese record.

She began competing as Kumiko Imura in the 2009 season.

== Competition record ==
Year	Competition	Venue	Position	Event	Notes
Representing Japan
2000	World Junior Championships	Santiago, Chile	9th (sf)	100m hurdles	13.52 (wind: -0.4 m/s)
2000	World Junior Championships	Santiago, Chile	3rd	Long jump	6.43 m (wind: +0.8 m/s)
2001	East Asian Games	Osaka, Japan	3rd	100 m hurdles	13.48
2001	East Asian Games	Osaka, Japan	2nd	Long jump	6.52 m
2001	World Championships	Edmonton, Canada	11th	Long jump	6.44 m
2001	Universiade	Beijing, China	3rd	Long jump	6.53 m
2002	Asian Championships	Colombo, Sri Lanka	5th	Long jump	6.32 m (w)
2003	World Championships	Paris, France	22nd (q)	Long jump	6.15 m
2004	World Indoor Championships	Budapest, Hungary	21st (q)	Long jump	6.35 m
2005	World Championships	Helsinki, Finland	15th (q)	Long jump	6.51 m
2005	Asian Championships	Incheon, South Korea	3rd	100 m hurdles	13.54
2005	Asian Championships	Incheon, South Korea	3rd	Long jump	6.52 m
2005	East Asian Games	Macau	1st	Long jump	6.54 m
2006	Asian Games	Doha, Qatar	1st	Long jump	6.81 m
2007	World Championships	Osaka, Japan	25th (q)	Long jump	6.42 m
2008	World Indoor Championships	Valencia, Spain	12th (q)	Long jump	6.17 m
2008	Olympic Games	Beijing, China	19th (q)	Long jump	6.47 m
2009	Asian Championships	Guangzhou, China	5th	Long jump	6.17 m
2010	Asian Games	Guangzhou, China	5th	Long jump	6.37 m
2011	Asian Championships	Kobe, Japan	7th	Long jump	6.23 m
