= Jamaica at the 2008 Summer Olympics =

- IOC code: JAM
- NOC: Jamaica Olympic Association
- Website: www.joa.org.jm

in Beijing
- Competitors: 50 in 4 sports
- Flag bearer: Veronica Campbell-Brown
- Medals Ranked 15th: Gold 5 Silver 4 Bronze 2 Total 11

Summer Olympics appearances (overview)
- 1948; 1952; 1956; 1960; 1964; 1968; 1972; 1976; 1980; 1984; 1988; 1992; 1996; 2000; 2004; 2008; 2012; 2016; 2020; 2024

Other related appearances
- British West Indies (1960 S)

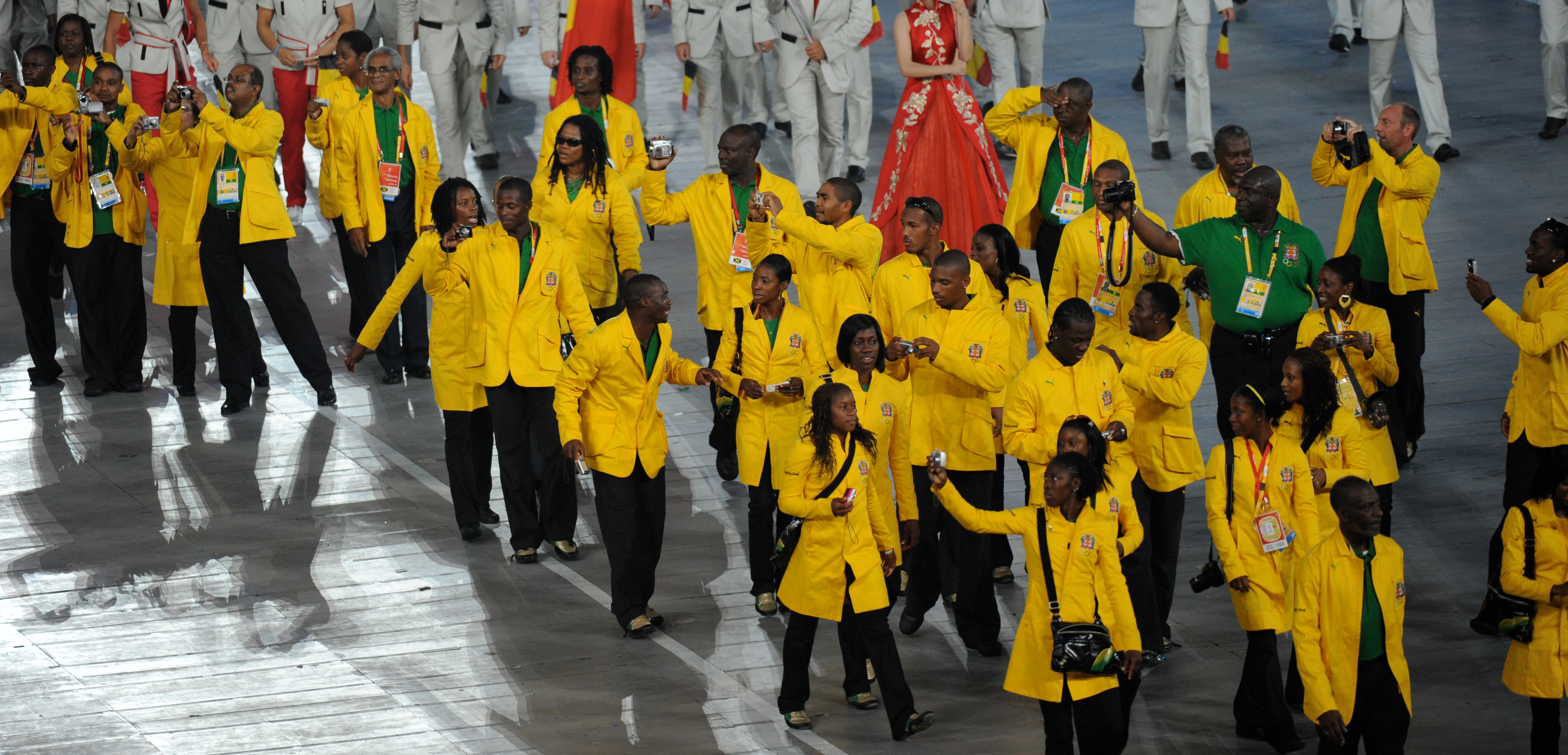
the team of Jamaica at the Opening Ceremony

Jamaica sent a delegation to compete at the 2008 Summer Olympics, held in Beijing, China from August 8 to August 24, 2008. This was, by far, Jamaica's best showing at the Summer Olympics; it was the nation's largest delegation yet, and its athletes nearly doubled its total gold medal count in addition to breaking the nation's record for number of medals earned in a single games. Jamaica's appearance at Beijing was its fifteenth consecutive appearance and appearance as an independent nation, although it had previously participated in four other games (including its 1948 debut) as a British colony and as part of the West Indies Federation. In the 29 events that included Jamaican athletes, there were 26 cases in which a Jamaican athlete or relay progressed to a final round. Usain Bolt won three of Jamaica's six gold medals at Beijing, breaking an Olympic and world record in all three of the events in which he participated. Shelly-Ann Fraser led an unprecedented Jamaican sweep of the medals in the Women's 100 m. Female sprinter Veronica Campbell-Brown carried Jamaica's flag at the ceremonies.

== Background ==
Jamaica is a large island with approximately 2.8 million residents that lies in the northern Caribbean. Lying to the south of Cuba and to the southwest of the countries on Hispaniola (Haiti and the Dominican Republic), the island was originally colonized by the Spanish Empire until the British seized control of the island in 1655. Jamaica first competed as a British colony at the 1948 Summer Olympics in London, England, and competed at the next two Summer Olympics under the same auspices of the British Empire. The colony joined Trinidad and Tobago and Barbados in 1958 to form the West Indies Federation, competing jointly with those nations at the 1960 Summer Olympics in Rome, Italy. Jamaica later withdrew from the West Indies Federation, declaring complete independence from Great Britain in 1962, And participated as an independent nation for the first time at the 1964 Summer Olympics in Tokyo, Japan. Between 1964 and 2008, the Caribbean nation sent delegations to all twelve Summer Olympic Games, in addition to five Winter Olympic Games.

Although athletes representing Jamaica had won medals at every Olympic Games since 1948 with the exceptions of the 1956 and 1964 games, the nation's delegation to the Beijing Olympics marked its most successful performance to that date than at any other Olympic Games. More athletes (50 in total, including more female athletes than ever before) competed for Jamaica in Beijing than at any previous Games, more gold medals were won (6 in Beijing alone, almost doubling the number of gold medals won in Jamaica's Olympic history) and more medals were won overall (11 medals, besting Jamaica's showing at the 2000 Summer Olympics in Sydney, where 9 medals were won).

At the Beijing games, 15 athletes were awarded medals for their performance in events. Three of those athletes (Kerron Stewart, Shericka Williams, and Usain Bolt) were awarded multiple medals. Usain Bolt won the most medals of any Jamaican at Beijing after achieving three gold medals. Of the 50 athletes, which were spread across four sports (swimming, track and field, cycling, and equestrianism) and 29 distinct events, Natasha Moodie was the youngest member of the delegation (17 years old), while Samantha Albert was the oldest member of the team (37 years old). Gold medalist Veronica Campbell-Brown was the nation's flag bearer at the ceremonies.

== Medalists ==
| Medal | Name | Sport | Event | Date |
|---|---|---|---|---|
| Gold | Usain Bolt | Athletics | Men's 100 m | August 16 |
| Gold | Shelly-Ann Fraser-Pryce | Athletics | Women's 100 m | August 17 |
| Gold | Usain Bolt | Athletics | Men's 200 m | August 20 |
| Gold | Melaine Walker | Athletics | Women's 400 m hurdles | August 20 |
| Gold | Veronica Campbell-Brown | Athletics | Women's 200 m | August 21 |
| Silver | Sherone Simpson | Athletics | Women's 100 m | August 17 |
| Silver | Kerron Stewart | Athletics | Women's 100 m | August 17 |
| Silver | Shericka Williams | Athletics | Women's 400 m | August 19 |
| Silver | Shereefa Lloyd; Rosemarie Whyte; Novlene Williams-Mills; Shericka Williams; Bobby-Gaye Wilkins* | Athletics | Women's 4 × 400m relay | August 23 |
| Bronze | Kerron Stewart | Athletics | Women's 200 m | August 21 |
| Bronze | Chelsea Hammond | Athletics | Women's long jump | August 22 |

Key: *Athletes competed in heats only

== Athletics ==
=== Men's competition ===
==== Men's 100 meters ====
Texas Christian University runner Michael Frater ran for Jamaica in the men's 100 meters dash. Born in Jamaica as the brother of 2000 Olympian Lindel Frater, Michael Frater's participation in Beijing marked his second Olympic appearance and second time competing in the event on an Olympic level, having previously represented Jamaica in the 2004 Athens Olympics. During the August 14 qualification round, Frater raced in the fourth heat. He took first with a time of 10.15 seconds, defeating second place finalists Pierre Browne of Canada and Darrel Brown of Trinidad and Tobago (10.22 seconds). Out of the 80 athletes that completed the qualification round, Frater placed second behind Great Britain's Tyrone Edgar (10.13 seconds). He advanced to the quarterfinals.

In the quarterfinals, which took place on August 15, Frater competed in the first heat. He completed the race in 10.09 seconds, taking second place behind Churandy Martina of the Netherlands Antilles (9.99 seconds) and ahead of Japan's Naoki Tsukahara (10.23 seconds). 40 competitors progressed to quarterfinals from the qualifications; Michael Frater placed 9th, tying the United States' Tyson Gay and Portugal's Francis Obikwelu. He progressed to the semifinals on August 16.

During the semifinals, Frater was placed in the first heat again. In this race, Frater ran a time of 10.01 seconds, placing fourth out of the eight athletes in the heat. Frater defeated Kim Collins of Saint Kitts and Nevis (10.05 seconds) but fell behind Trinidad and Tobago's Marc Burns (9.97 seconds). The leaders of Frater's heat included Jamaica's Usain Bolt (9.85 seconds) and the United States' Walter Dix (9.95 seconds). Frater ranked seventh out of the 16 semifinalists, and progressed to the final round. The final round took place later on August 16, and Frater placed sixth with a time of 9.97 seconds. He placed ahead of Trinidadian Burns (10.01 seconds) and behind Jamaican Asafa Powell (9.95 seconds).

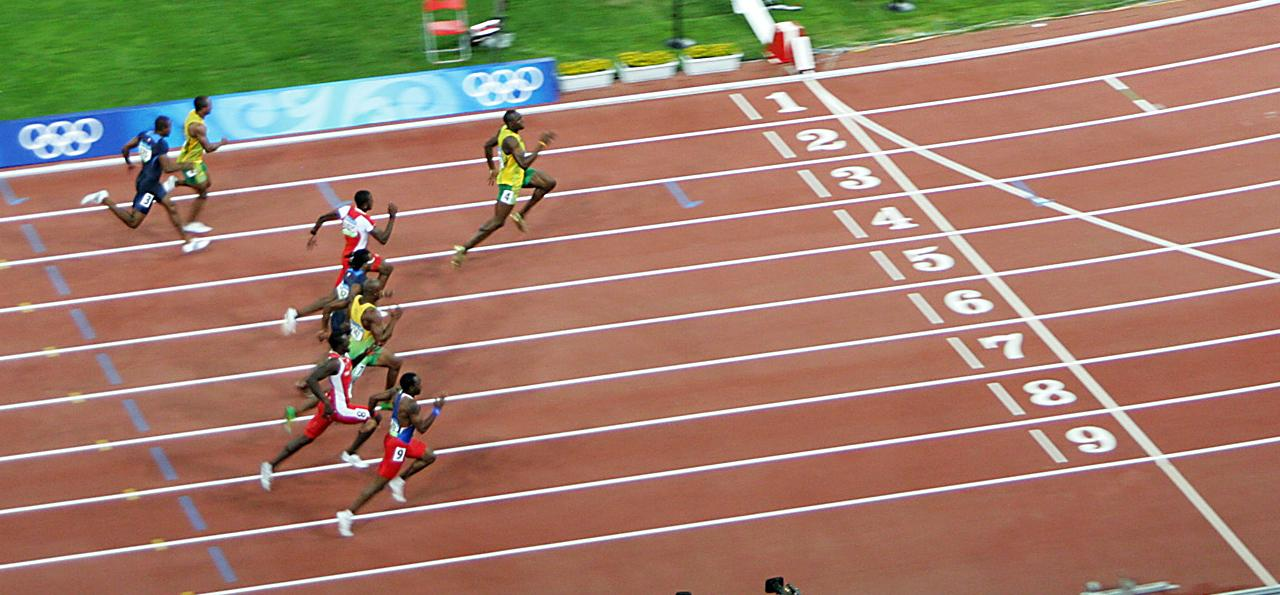
The participants in the men's 100 meters. Usain Bolt demonstrates a clear lead. Asafa Powell and Michael Frater are also visible.

Asafa Powell was 25 at the time he represented Jamaica in the men's 100 meters race at the Beijing Olympics. Born in Linstead, a small town to the northwest of Kingston, and the brother of fellow Olympian Donovan Powell, Asafa Powell had participated earlier in the 2004 Athens Olympics while 21 years old. He took part in the men's 100 meters and men's 200 meters races. Powell competed in the second heat of the August 14 qualifications, placing first with a time of 10.16 seconds. Kim Collins of Saint Kitts and Nevis placed second in the heat (10.17 seconds) and Great Britain's Craig Pickering placed third (10.21 seconds). Overall, Powell place third out of 80 athletes a millisecond behind fellow Jamaican Michael Frater. He progressed to quarterfinals.

At the quarterfinals, Powell competed in the fifth heat and finished first again with a time of 10.02 seconds. He defeated the United States' Walter Dix (10.08 seconds), who placed second, and the Bahamas' Derrick Atkins (10.14 seconds), who placed third. Out of the 40 quarterfinalists, Powell placed fourth. He progressed to the semifinal round.

Powell participation in the second heat of the semifinal round placed him first in his heat again with a time of 9.91 seconds, placing him ahead of Trinidad and Tobago's Richard Thompson (9.93 seconds) and the Netherlands Antilles' Churandy Martina (9.94 seconds). Powell placed second out of the 16 semifinalists, ranking only behind fellow Jamaican Usain Bolt (9.85 seconds). He progressed to finals. During the last race of the event, Powell placed fifth with a time of 9.95 seconds, making him the second fastest Jamaican in the race. Martina placed ahead of him for fourth place (9.93 seconds) and Frater placed behind him for sixth (9.97 seconds).

Born in Sherwood Content, a small town in northern inland Jamaica, Usain "Lightning" Bolt was 21 years old when he competed on Jamaica's behalf in Beijing. Among his event, Bolt participated in the men's 100 meters dash, his first time competing in the event in the Olympics. Bolt previously competed for Jamaica in the men's 200 meters in Athens while 17 years old, but did not advance to later heats. During the August 14 qualification round, Bolt was placed in the first heat. He completed the race in 10.20 seconds, placing first ahead of Antigua and Barbuda's Daniel Bailey (10.24 seconds) and Brazil's Vicente Lima (10.26 seconds). Bolt ranked fifth out of the 80 competitors behind both Frater and Powell. He advanced to quarterfinals.

On August 15, Bolt competed in the quarterfinals. He was placed in the fourth heat. Usain Bolt finished the race in 9.92 seconds, again taking first in his heat and defeating the United States' Doc Patton (10.04 seconds) and Portugal's Francis Obikwelu (10.09 seconds). This time, Bolt placed first overall out of the 40 quarterfinalists, finishing three places ahead of Asafa Powell. Bolt advanced to the semifinal round, which took place the next day.

During the semifinals, Bolt was placed in the first heat. With a time of 9.85 seconds, Bolt placed first, ahead of the United States' Walter Dix (9.95 seconds); Trinidad and Tobago's Marc Burns (9.97 seconds); and fellow Jamaican Michael Frater (10.01 seconds). Of the 16 people participating in the event's semifinal round, Bolt placed first. Asafa Powell ranked just behind him (9.91 seconds). Bolt progressed to the final round, which occurred later that day. During finals, Usain Bolt won the gold medal with a world record-breaking time of 9.69 seconds despite easing up towards the final meters in order to celebrate.

==== Men's 200 meters ====
Christopher Williams was 36 years old at the time of his participation in the 2008 Beijing Olympics. Born in Mandeville, the capital of Manchester Parish in west-central Jamaica, Williams' participation in Beijing marked his sixth time participating in an Olympic event and the third time he had appeared at an Olympic Games (previously representing Jamaica in three events in the 2000 Sydney games and one event in the 2004 Athens games). In Sydney, Williams was part of the men's 4 × 400 meters relay, winning the silver medal in the event. In Beijing, Williams participated in the men's 200 meters dash, which had a qualification round that took place on August 17. He was placed in the second heat, where he placed third out of its eight athletes with a time of 20.53 seconds. Although placing ahead of Japan's Shinji Takahira (20.58 seconds), Williams fell behind heat leaders Brian Dzingai of Zimbabwe (20.25 seconds) and Great Britain's Christian Malcolm (20.42 seconds). Overall, of the 62 athletes completing the event, Williams placed fifth. That was higher than the other two Jamaicans competing in the event (Usain Bolt placed 17th and Marvin Anderson placed 27th). He advanced to the quarterfinals.

In the quarterfinals, which took place on August 18, Williams took part in the second heat. He again ranked third with a time of 20.28 seconds, defeating Malcolm from his previous heat (20.30 seconds) but falling behind heat leaders Dzingai (20.23 seconds) and the United States' Walter Dix (20.27 seconds). Takahira also was in Williams' heat, placing seventh (20.63 seconds). Of the 31 finishing quarterfinalists, Williams ranked fourth. He placed just ahead of Usain Bolt, who finished 0.01 seconds behind him. Williams advanced to the semifinals.

Williams participated in the first heat of the semifinals on August 19, placing sixth out of the eight heat athletes with a time of 20.45 seconds. He placed directly ahead of Canada's Jared Connaughton (20.58 seconds) and behind Ireland's Paul Hession (20.38 seconds), while Dutch Antilean sprinter Churandy Martina (20.11 seconds) and Zimbabwe's Dzingai (20.17 seconds) led the heat. Overall, Williams placed 11th out of the 15 finishing semifinalists. He did not progress to the final round.

26-year-old Marvin Anderson competed in the Beijing Olympics while representing Jamaica. He raced in the men's 200 meters, which marked his first Olympic performance. Anderson was born in Trelawny Parish, which lies on the northern coast of Jamaica, and has had affiliations with Reebok. During the August 17 qualification round, Anderson competed in the third heat. He finished his race in 20.85 seconds, placing third in a heat of eight athletes. While he ranked ahead of Slovenia's Matic Osovnikar (20.89 seconds), he fell behind Great Britain's Marlon Devonish (20.49 seconds) and Saint Kitts and Nevis' Kim Collins (20.55 seconds). Out of the 62 finishing athletes, Anderson ranked 27th. He progressed to the quarterfinal round, where he was placed in the fourth heat. However, Anderson did not finish the race due to a leg injury, making him the only quarterfinalist to not complete the men's 200 meters at Beijing.

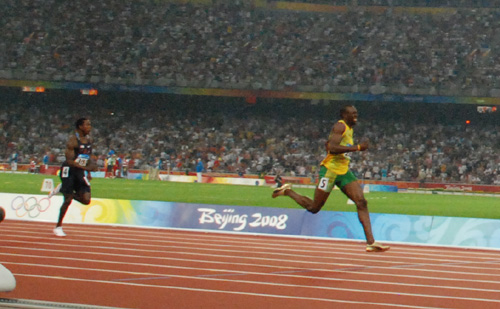
Usain Bolt at the 200 meters race in Beijing

Usain Bolt also competed in the men's 200 meters race. Although he participated in the men's 100 meters and the men's 4 × 100 meters relay in addition to the 200 meters, this race was the only one in which he had competed at the Olympics for the second time (he previously raced in the 200 meters in Athens). During the August 17 qualification round, Bolt competed in the fifth heat. He ran the race in 20.64 seconds, placing second out of the nine athletes in his heat. Rondel Sorrillo of Trinidad and Tobago placed ahead of him (20.58 seconds), while Belgium's Kristof Beyens placed behind him (20.69 seconds). Out of 62 finishing athletes, Bolt tied Poland's Marcin Jędrusiński for 17th place. He advanced to the next round.

During the quarterfinals, Bolt was placed in the first heat. Running the race in 20.29 seconds, Bolt defeated all other athletes in his eight-person heat. Specifically, the United States' Shawn Crawford placed second (20.42 seconds) while Saint Kitts and Nevis' Kim Collins tied Great Britain's Marlon Devonish for third place (20.43 seconds). Ranking fifth out of the 31 quarterfinalists, Bolt progressed to the semifinal round. He was the second-fastest Jamaican in the round, with Christopher Williams placing ahead of him (20.28 seconds).

The August 18 semifinal round placed Bolt in the second heat versus seven other athletes. He placed ahead of all of them again with a time of 20.09 seconds, specifically defeating Crawford (20.12 seconds) and the United States' Wallace Spearmon (20.14 seconds). Overall, fifteen semifinalists finished the race, and Bolt ranked first. He progressed to the final round. During this last race, which took place on August 20, Bolt took the gold medal with a time of 19.30 seconds, which set a world record in the process. He broke the world record previously set by Michael Johnson at the 1996 Summer Olympics.

==== Men's 110 meters hurdles ====
25-year-old Richard Phillips represented Jamaica in the men's 110 meters hurdles, marking the second time he ran for Jamaica at the Olympics—he previously did so in the 2004 Athens Olympics, progressing as far as the semifinal round. Born in Saint Catherine Parish in central Jamaica, Phillips had also participated in the athletics programs at George Mason University. During the August 17 qualification round, Phillips participated in the first heat. He completed the run in 13.60 seconds, placing fourth in a heat of seven athletes. China's Ji Wei placed ahead of him (13.57 seconds), while Russia's Evgeniy Borisov placed behind him (13.90 seconds). The leaders of Phillip's heat included eventual gold medalist Dayron Robles of Cuba (13.39 seconds) and Andy Turner of Great Britain (13.56 seconds). He tied France's Samuel Coco-Viloin for 21st place out of the 40 finishing athletes. Phillips progressed to quarterfinals.

The quarterfinals took place on August 19, where Phillips participated in the first heat. The Jamaican hurdler placed fifth in a heat of eight athletes with a time of 13.48 seconds, defeating Trinidad and Tobago's Mikel Thomas (13.62 seconds) but falling behind Greece's Konstantinos Douvalidis (13.46 seconds). The leaders of Phillips' quarterfinal heat were the United States' David Payne (13.24 seconds) and the Czech Republic's Petr Svoboda (13.41 seconds). Of the 30 finishing quarter finalists, Phillips tied Dutch hurdler Marcel van der Westen for 14th place. He advanced to the semifinals.

Phillips participated in the semifinals in the first heat which took place on August 20. Finishing his event in 13.43 seconds, Phillips ranked fourth in his heat of eight hurdlers. He ranked ahead of Greece's Riks (13.55 seconds) and behind France's Ladji Doucouré (13.22 seconds), although the heat itself was led by Cuban hurdler Robles (13.12 seconds) and American hurdler Payne (13.21 seconds). Phillips ranked ninth out of the 16 semifinalists, and advanced to the final round. In the August 21 final round, Phillips finished in seventh place with a time of 13.60 seconds. Jackson Quiñónez of Spain ranked eighth (13.69 seconds) and fellow Jamaican Maurice Wignall ranked sixth (13.46 seconds), while Dayron Robles took gold (12.93 seconds), David Payne took silver (13.17 seconds), and the United States' David Oliver took bronze (13.18 seconds).

32-year-old Maurice Wignall also participated for Jamaica at the men's 110 meters hurdles. Born in Saint Andrew Parish, which lies to the north of the capital city of Kingston, Wignall has been affiliated with the Mizuno Track Club in Osaka, Japan. Previously, Wignall represented Jamaica in the same event at the 2004 Athens Olympics. During the August 17 qualification round, Wignall competed in the fourth heat alongside six other athletes. With a time of 13.61 seconds, he ranked fourth ahead of Belarusian Maksim Lynsha (13.86 seconds) and behind Nigeria's Selim Adewunmi Nurudeen (13.58 seconds). Out of the 40 finishing athletes, Wignall tied Hungary's Daniel Kiss for 23rd place. He advanced to the quarterfinals.

Wignall competed in the quarterfinals in the third heat on August 19. He finished his event in 13.36 seconds, ranking first. Barbados' Ryan Brathwaite ranked second (13.44 seconds), while Colombia's Paulo Villar ranked third (13.46 seconds). Overall, of the 30 athletes, Wignall tied Poland's Artur Noga for 4th place. He advanced to the semifinals.

Wignall competed against seven other athletes in the semifinals on August 20. Finishing with a time of 13.40 seconds, he tied Spain's Quinoñez for third place. China's Shi Dongpeng fell behind them (13.42 seconds), while Noga ranked ahead of them (13.34 seconds). American hurdler David Oliver took first place in the heat (13.31 seconds). Wignall took seventh place out of the 16 semifinalists, and advanced to the August 21 finals. During that round, Wignall took sixth place at 13.46 seconds. He placed ahead of Richard Phillips (13.60 seconds) and behind Noga (13.36 seconds).

==== Men's 400 meters hurdles ====
Markino Buckley competed for Jamaica in the men's 400 meters hurdles. He had been affiliated with the MVP Track and Field Club, which is based in the capital city of Kingston. At the time of his performance in Beijing, Buckley was 22 years old; his participation in Beijing marked the first time he had ever participated in an Olympic Games. During the August 15 qualifications, he was placed in the third heat. Buckley completed the run in 48.65 seconds, placing first in a heat of six people. South Africa's LJ van Zyl placed second (48.86 seconds), while Poland's Marek Plawgo placed third (49.17 seconds). Out of the 25 finishing competitors in the qualification round, Buckley ranked first. Fellow Jamaican Danny McFarlane placed third in the event at around 0.2 seconds slower than Buckley did. He advanced to the semifinal round, which took place on August 16.

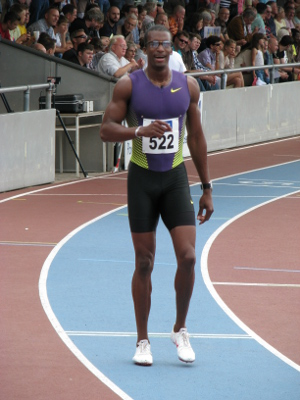
Isa Phillips, who participated in the men's 400 meters hurdles for Jamaica at Beijing

During the semifinals, Markino Buckley participated in the eight-person second heat. He finished the event in 48.50 seconds, placing third and defeating Greek hurdler Periklis Iakovakis (48.69 seconds). Jamaican athlete McFarlane placed second, ahead of him (48.33 seconds), as did the United States' first-place finalist Kerron Clement (48.27 seconds). Out of the 16 semifinalists, Buckley placed fifth. He progressed to the final round. During this race on August 18, Buckley placed seventh with a time of 48.60 seconds. Plawgo placed sixth (48.52 seconds) and Iakovakis placed eighth (49.96 seconds), with all three medalists being Americans.

Danny McFarlane also participated in the men's 400 meters hurdles race. At 36 years of age, McFarlane was born in Saint Mary Parish in Jamaica's northern regions. He previously participated in two other Olympic Games and three events (The men's 400 meters and men's 4 x 400 meters relay in Sydney, and the men's 400 meters hurdles in Athens), winning silver medals in the Sydney relay and the Athens hurdles race. During the August 15 qualifications, McFarlane participated in the second heat against five other athletes. He placed second with a time of 48.86 seconds, defeating South Africa's Alwyn Myburgh (48.92 seconds) but placing behind the United States' Angelo Taylor (48.67 seconds). Overall, McFarlane tied South Africa's van Zyl for third place out of the 25 finishing athletes. He advanced to the semifinals.

The August 16 semifinals placed McFarlane in the second heat. He completed the race in 48.33 seconds. American hurdler Clement placed first in the heat (48.27 seconds), while fellow Jamaican Markino Buckley placed third (48.50 seconds). Overall, of the semifinal round of sixteen athletes, McFarlane finished in fourth place and again in the finals on August 17. He ranked higher than any other Jamaican, and below every American athlete participating in the event (Angelo Taylor, Bershawn Jackson and Kerron Clement placed ahead of him).

Isa Phillips participated on Jamaica's behalf in the men's 400 meters hurdles race. Born in the capital city of Kingston, Phillips was 24 years old when he participated in the Beijing Olympics. He had not previously taken part in any Olympic Games. During the August 15 qualification round, Phillips competed in the fourth heat. During the course of the events, Phillips placed third out of a heat of six people when he finished the race in 49.55 seconds. Periklis Iakovakis of Greece placed ahead of him (49.50 seconds) in second place, while Kerron Clement of the United States placed first in the heat (49.42 seconds). Japan's Dai Tamesue placed behind Phillips (49.82 seconds). Out of the 25 finishing athletes, Phillips placed 14th. He progressed to the semifinal round.

During the August 16 semifinal round, Phillips participated in the first heat, which included eight athletes. He finished fifth after finishing the race in 48.85 seconds. In doing so, Phillips defeated Russia's Aleksandr Derevyagin (49.23 seconds) and placed behind Poland's Marek Plawgo (48.75 seconds). The heat was led by the United States' Angelo Taylor (47.94 seconds) and the United States' Bershawn Jackson (48.02 seconds). Of the 16 semifinalists, Isa Phillips placed ninth. He was the only Jamaican who did not advance to the final round in the event.

==== Men's 400 meters ====
Ricardo Chambers represented Jamaica in the men's 400 meters dash. Born in Trelawny Parish on Jamaica's northern shores, Chambers attended Florida State University and competed in Beijing at the age of 23 both in this event and in the men's 4 x 400 meters relay. The sprinter had not previously competed in any Olympic Games or event. The qualification round of the event took place on August 17; Ricardo Chambers participated in the fourth heat, finishing his race in 45.22 seconds. He placed third ahead of Dominica's Erison Hurtault (46.10 seconds) but behind Great Britain's Martyn Rooney (45.00 seconds) and Australia's Sean Wroe (45.17 seconds). Out of the 55 finishing athletes, Chambers tied the United States' David Neville for 13th place. He progressed to the semifinals, which took place on August 19.

During the semifinal round, Ricardo Chambers competed in the second heat. He ran the distance in 45.09 seconds, placing fourth out of the eight athletes in the heat. While placing ahead of Belgium's Jonathan Borlée (45.11 seconds), Chambers placed behind Australia's third place finalist Joel Milburn (45.06 seconds) as well as the leaders of the heat, first place heat finalist Leslie Djhone of France (44.79 seconds) and David Neville (44.91 seconds), who tied Chambers during the qualification round. Overall, 24 athletes participated in the semifinal round. Chambers ranked in 15th place. He did not advance to the final round.

Michael Blackwood participated in the men's 400 meters race on Jamaica's behalf in the Beijing Olympics. Born within the vicinity of the Jamaican city of Clarendon, Blackwood was 29 years old at the time of his participation in the Beijing Olympics. His participation in Beijing marked his third Olympic appearance; he had participated in two events in the 2004 Athens Olympics and one event in the 2000 Sydney Olympics. During the course of the Sydney Olympics, Blackwood won a silver medal. The August 17 qualification round placed the Jamaican sprinter in the sixth heat. He placed fourth out of its eight athletes, displacing Canada's Tyler Christopher (45.67 seconds) but falling behind the Bahamas' Michael Mathieu (45.17 seconds). The leaders of Blackwood's heat were Great Britain's Andrew Steele (44.94 seconds) and Trinidad and Tobago's Renny Quow (45.13 seconds). Out of the 55 finishing athletes, Blackwood placed 25th. He did not progress to later rounds.

Sanjay Ayre also represented Jamaica at the men's 400 meters dash. Born in the capital city of Kingston, Ayre attended Auburn University in Alabama and, at age 20, competed for Jamaica in the 2000 Sydney Olympics. During the course of the 4 x 400 meters relay competition in Sydney, Ayre won a silver medal alongside his fellow relay runners. His participation in the men's 400 meters marked the first time he ran the event at the Olympics. Ayre did not attend the Athens Olympics in 2004. During the August 17 qualification round, Ayre competed in the second heat. He ranked fifth in his heat with a time of 45.66 seconds, defeating the Dominican Republic's Arismendy Peguero Matos (46.28 seconds) but falling behind the Democratic Republic of the Congo's Gary Kikaya (44.89 seconds). Ayre's heat was led by Bahamian sprinter Christopher Brown (44.79 seconds) and Australian runner Joel Milburn (44.80 seconds). Out of the 55 athletes who finished the qualification round, he ranked 27th. Ayre did not advance to later rounds.

==== Men's 800 meters ====
Aldwyn Sappleton was the sole Jamaican representative in the men's 800 meters race during the Beijing Olympics. Born in Saint Ann Parish, which is the largest parish in Jamaica and is situated on the northern coast, Sappleton was 26 years old at the time of his participation in the Beijing Olympics. He had not previously competed in any Olympic events. During the August 20 qualification round, Sappleton was placed in the seventh heat, which included seven athletes. He placed sixth with a time of 1:48.19. Kyrgyzstan's Sergei Pakura ranked behind Sappleton (1:50.54), while Senegal's Abdoulaye Wagne ranked directly ahead of him (1:47.50). The Jamaican runner's heat was led by Kuwait's Mohammad Al-Azemi, Bahrain's Yusuf Saad Kamel, and the Netherlands' Robert Lathouwers, who tied for first (1:46.94). Out of the 58 finishing athletes, Sappleton tied Jakub Holuša of the Czech Republic for 41st place. He did not advance to the semifinal round on August 21.

==== Men's decathlon ====
Maurice Smith participated on Jamaica's behalf as its sole representative in the men's decathlon. Born in Spanish Town, the capital of the southeasterly Saint Catherine Parish, Maurice Smith was 27 years old at the time of his participation in the Beijing Olympics. He previously participated for Jamaica in the 2004 Summer Olympics in Athens, where he finished in 14th place. On August 20, Maurice Smith competed in the first event of the decathlon during the second heat. He finished the event in 10.85 seconds, placing second and directly defeating Estonia's Andres Raja (10.89 seconds) while falling behind Cuba's Yordani Garcia (10.64 seconds). Out of the 40 athletes, Maurice Smith finished 7th. The next event, long jump, Maurice Smith participated in the second heat and tied Estonia's Mikk Pahapill for 15th place with a distance of 7.04 meters. 37 people finished the event; Smith placed 23rd. Smith participated in the shot put in the first heat, which included 20 athletes. 18 of them finished, and Smith placed eighth among them. The Ukraine's Oleksiy Kasyanov ranked ahead of him (15.15 meters) while Liberia's Jangy Addy ranked behind him (14.91 meters). The heat was led by Russia's Aleksandr Pogorelov (16.53 seconds) and the United States' Bryan Clay (16.27 seconds). Of the 36 finishing athletes, the Jamaican athlete ranked 10th. In the next event, Maurice Smith participated in the first heat, which included seven other people. Smith ranked first out of the six finishing athletes, defeating Liberia's Jangy Addy (48.51 seconds) and the United States' Bryan Clay (48.92 seconds). Of the 31 finishing athletes, Maurice Smith ranked sixth.

During the 110 meters hurdles, Maurice Smith was placed in the second heat against eight other athletes. Maurice Smith ranked third with a time of 14.08 seconds. Andres Raja of Estonia ranked second (14.06 seconds) and American decathlete Bryan Clay ranked first (13.93 seconds). He placed fourth of the 29 finishing athletes. In the discus throw event, Maurice Smith was in the first heat and placed second out of the 14 finishing athletes, having thrown the discus 53.79 meters away. Pogorelov finished directly behind Smith (50.04 meters), while Clay finished directly ahead of him (53.79 meters). Overall, 29 competitors finished the event. The Jamaican athlete ranked second. In the pole vault, Smith vaunted over a 4.6 meter-tall bar. He placed fifth of the 11 people who finished in his heat, behind Belarus' Mikalai Shubianok and ahead of China's Qi Haifeng. Of the 24 finishing athletes, Smith ranked 18th. Javelin occurred next; he participated in the first heat of the event, finishing ninth out of 13 finishing athletes after throwing the javelin 51.52 meters. Smith placed between Kasyanov (51.59 meters) and Iran's Hadi Sepehrzad (49.56 meters) in a heat led by Garcia (65.60 meters) and France's Romain Barras (65.40 meters). The final event of the decathlon was the 1500 meters decathlon; Maurice Smith participated in the second heat, placing fifth of 13 athletes by finishing the race in 4:31.62 between Barras (4:29.29) and Germany's André Niklaus (4:32.90). He placed seventh of 26 athletes, concluding the decathlon. Smith accrued 8,205 points, ranking ninth of the 26 athletes that finished the decathlon.

==== Men's shot put ====
East Orange, New Jersey-born field athlete Dorian Scott competed for Jamaica in the men's shot put. He was 26 years old at the time, and had not competed at any Olympic Games prior to his performance in Beijing. During the August 14 qualifying round, Scott was placed in the second heat, which included 23 athletes. He was given three chances to put the shot. During his first attempt, the shot flew 19.54 meters, placing him 10th; in the second, 19.94 meters, placing him sixth; and in the third, 19.71 meters. However, since his second score was the best mark he received, the third score went unranked and the second score was used as his final score in the qualifying round. Overall, Scott placed 15th out of the 40 placing athletes, falling behind the Ukraine's Andriy Semenov (20.01 meters) but displacing Australia's Justin Anlezark (19.91 meters). He did not progress to the final round on August 15.

==== Men's long jump ====
Native-born long jumper Herbert McGregor represented Jamaica at the Beijing Olympics, and was the only male long jumper involved in his event. He was 26 years old at the time of his entrance into the Olympics, having not previously participated at any Olympic Games. The qualification round for men's long jump took place on August 16, where McGregor competed in the second heat. The long jumper was given three attempts. During the first, McGregor jumped 7.64 meters, setting his highest time of the three attempts; he ranked fifteenth in his heat with that score. His second attempt (7.46 meters) and his third attempt (7.36 meters) were discounted in favor of his best mark. Overall, McGregor ranked 30 out of the 38 athletes who received a score, falling behind Morocco's Tarik Bouguetaïb (7.69 meters) and placing ahead of Denmark's Morten Jensen (7.63 meters). He did not participate in the final round, which was held on August 18.

==== Men's 4 × 100 meters relay ====
Jamaica sent a team to compete in the men's 4 x 100 meters relay at the Beijing Olympics. The team competed in the semifinal (first) round on August 21, when they participated in the second heat against seven teams. This first team included both Asafa Powell and Michael Frater (who also participated in the men's 100 meters). It also included 22-year-old Nesta Carter, who was born in Banana Ground in Manchester Parish and who participated in his first Olympics in this event, and 27-year-old three-time Olympian and Northwestern University-affiliated athlete Dwight Thomas. During the course of the first round race, Jamaica took first place in the heat with a time of (38.31 seconds). The delegation's team defeated the Canadian relay, which took second place (38.77 seconds), and the German relay, which took third (38.93 seconds). Of the 16 relay teams that participated in the event, ten finished. Of those ten, Jamaica took second place behind the Trinidadian team (28.26 seconds) and ahead of the Japanese relay (38.52 seconds). The team advanced to the final round.

The final round took place on August 22, and included nine relay teams (among them, Jamaica). During this final race, Usain Bolt took Dwight Thomas' place, although Michael Frater, Asafa Powell, and Nesta Carter remained in the relay. With a time of 37.10 seconds, Jamaica's relay took the gold medal, as well as breaking the Olympic and world records in the event. They defeated Trinidad and Tobago, which took silver, and Japan, which took bronze.

On 25 January 2017 the Jamaican team were stripped of the gold medal place due to Nesta Carter testing positive for the prohibited substance methylhexaneamine.

==== Men's 4 × 400 meters relay ====
Jamaica sent a team to compete at the Beijing Olympics in the men's 4 x 400 meters relay. During the semifinal (first) round, Jamaica's team included three athletes who had also competed in individual events: Michael Blackwood, Sanjay Ayre, and Ricardo Chambers. It also included Allodin Fothergill, a then 21-year-old athlete born in Saint Catherine Parish and from the University of Maryland Eastern Shore who participated in the Olympics for the first time in this relay. Placed in the second heat of the August 22 semifinal round, the Jamaican team placed third in the heat with a time of 3:00.09. The German relay ranked behind it in fourth place (3:03.49), while the Bahamian one ranked ahead in second (2:59.88). The heat itself was led by the British relay (2:59.33). Overall, Jamaica's team ranked fourth of the 16 competing relays. It advanced to the final round.

The team that participated in the August 23 final round included Blackwood, Chambers, and Ayre. It exchanged Allodin Fothergill for Lansford Spence, an athlete who was born in Manchester Parish, attended Auburn University, and entered Beijing as a 25-year-old. During the event's last round, Jamaica ranked last in the heat of eight relays with a time of 3:01.45). The ranked directly behind the Polish delegation (3:00.32), which ranked directly behind the Australian delegation (3:00.02). In comparison, the gold medalist American relay broke an Olympic record with a time of 2:55.39.

==== Summary ====
Twenty-one athletes composed the male Jamaican track and field team that participated in Beijing, comprising over a third of the Jamaican Olympic delegation at the 2008 Olympics. Of those twenty, eleven (Anderson, Williams, R. Phillips, Wignall, I. Phillips, McFarlane, Buckley, Sappleton, Smith, Scott, McGregor) only participated in individual events; four participated only in team events (Carter, Thomas, Fothergill, Spence); and six competed in both individual and team events (Bolt, Frater, Powell, Blackwood, Chambers, Ayre). Over a quarter of the medals won by Jamaica in Beijing were won by its male track team, including two singular events (men's 100 meters and the men's 200 meters, both by Usain Bolt) and one relay team (men's 4x100 meters relay, including Thomas, Frater, Carter, Powell, and Bolt). Usain Bolt held the record for medals won by a Jamaican at the Beijing games, medaling gold in every event in which he participated.

Key

- Note–Ranks given for track events are within the athlete's heat only
- Q = Qualified for the next round
- q = Qualified for the next round as a fastest loser or, in field events, by position without achieving the qualifying target
- NR = National record
- N/A = Round not applicable for the event
- Bye = Athlete not required to compete in round

Men
Track & road events

| Athlete | Event | Heat | | Quarterfinal | | Semifinal | | Final | |
| Athlete | Event | Result | Rank | Result | Rank | Result | Rank | Result | Rank |
|---|---|---|---|---|---|---|---|---|---|
| Usain Bolt | 100 m | 10.20 | 1 Q | 9.92 | 1 Q | 9.85 | 1 Q | 9.69 WR | 1st place, gold medalist(s) |
| Michael Frater | 100 m | 10.15 | 1 Q | 10.09 | 2 Q | 10.01 | 4 Q | 9.97 | 6 |
| Asafa Powell | 100 m | 10.16 | 1 Q | 10.02 | 1 Q | 9.91 | 1 Q | 9.95 | 5 |
| Marvin Anderson | 200 m | 20.85 | 3 Q | DNF | | Did not advance | | | |
| Usain Bolt | 200 m | 20.64 | 2 Q | 20.29 | 1 Q | 20.09 | 1 Q | 19.30 WR | 1st place, gold medalist(s) |
| Christopher Williams | 200 m | 20.53 | 3 Q | 20.28 | 3 Q | 20.45 | 6 | Did not advance | |
| Michael Blackwood | 400 m | 45.56 | 4 | —N/a | | Did not advance | | | |
| Sanjay Ayre | 400 m | 45.66 | 5 | —N/a | | Did not advance | | | |
| Ricardo Chambers | 400 m | 45.22 | 3 Q | —N/a | | 45.09 | 4 | Did not advance | |
| Aldwyn Sappleton | 800 m | 1:48.19 | 6 | —N/a | | Did not advance | | | |
| Richard Phillips | 110 m hurdles | 13.60 | 4 Q | 13.43 | 5 q | 13.48 | 4 Q | 13.60 | 7 |
| Maurice Wignall | 110 m hurdles | 13.61 | 4 Q | 13.36 | 1 Q | 13.40 | 4 Q | 13.46 | 6 |
| Markino Buckley | 400 m hurdles | 48.65 | 1 Q | —N/a | | 48.50 | 3 Q | 48.60 | 7 |
| Danny McFarlane | 400 m hurdles | 48.86 | 2 Q | —N/a | | 48.33 | 2 Q | 48.30 | 4 |
| Isa Phillips | 400 m hurdles | 49.55 | 3 Q | —N/a | | 48.85 | 5 | Did not advance | |
| Dwight Thomas*; Michael Frater; Nesta Carter; Asafa Powell; Usain Bolt** | 4 × 100 m relay | 38.31 | 1 Q | —N/a | | | | 37.10 WR | 1st place, gold medalist(s) |
| Michael Blackwood; Allodin Fothergill*; Sanjay Ayre; Ricardo Chambers; Lansford Spence** | 4 × 400 m relay | 3:00.09 | 3 Q | —N/a | | | | 3:01.45 | 8 |

* Competed in heats only; ** Competed in finals only

Field events

| Athlete | Event | Qualification | | Final | |
| Athlete | Event | Distance | Position | Distance | Position |
|---|---|---|---|---|---|
| Herbert McGregor | Long jump | 7.64 | 26 | Did not advance | |
| Dorian Scott | Shot put | 19.94 | 15 | Did not advance | |

Combined events – Decathlon

| Athlete | Event | 100 m | LJ | SP | HJ | 400 m | 110H | DT | PV | JT | 1500 m | Final | Rank |
|---|---|---|---|---|---|---|---|---|---|---|---|---|---|
| Maurice Smith | Result | 10.85 | 7.04 | 15.09 | 1.99 | 47.96 | 14.08 | 50.91 | 4.60 | 51.52 | 4:31.62 | 8205 | 8 |
| Maurice Smith | Points | 894 | 823 | 795 | 794 | 911 | 964 | 889 | 790 | 611 | 734 | 8205 | 8 |

=== Women's competition ===
==== Women's 100 meters ====
Shelly-Ann Fraser competed in the women's 100 meters for Jamaica at the Beijing Olympics. Born in the Waterhouse District of Kingston, Fraser had competed with the MVP Track and Field Club based in the city of her birth. Her appearance at the Olympics marked the first time she participated in an Olympic Games. In the sixth heat of the August 15 qualification round, Fraser competed and placed first out of nine athletes with a time of 11.35 seconds. Ghana's Vida Anim placed behind Fraser (11.47 seconds) in second place, and Gabon's Paulette Ruddy Zang Milama placed behind Anim (11.62 seconds). Of the 85 competitors, Fraser placed 13th. She advanced to the quarterfinals.

Quarterfinals took place on August 16, during which Fraser participated in the first heat. Of the eight athletes participating in her heat, Fraser again placed first with a time of 11.06 seconds. Russia's Evgeniya Polyakova placed behind Fraser in second (11.13 seconds), and Great Britain's Jeanette Kwakye placed behind Polyakova in third place (11.18 seconds). 40 quarterfinalists participated in the race; she ranked third, behind fellow Jamaicans Kerron Stewart (10.98 seconds) and Sherone Simpson (11.02 seconds). Fraser progressed to the semifinals.

Fraser participated in the first heat of the August 17 semifinal round. She placed first out of its eight athletes, finishing the race in 11.00 seconds. American sprinters Muna Lee (11.06 seconds) and Lauryn Williams (11.10 seconds) finished, respectively, in second and third place. Fellow Jamaican Simpson placed fourth (11.11 seconds). During this race, Fraser ranked first out of the 16 semifinalists, barely displacing Kerron Stewart (11.05 seconds). She advanced to the finals. During that round, which took place later that day, Fraser won the gold medal with a time of 10.78 seconds. The other two Jamaicans in the event tied for the silver medal (10.98 seconds).

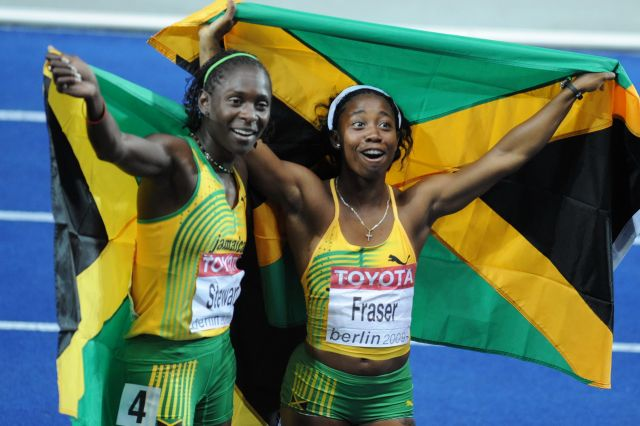
Shelly-Ann Fraser and Kerron Stewart, who medaled in Beijing in 100 meters

Sherone Simpson represented Jamaica in the women's 100 meters dash at the Beijing Olympics. She was born in Manchester Parish, which extends off the southern coast of the island, participated in the MVP Track and Field Club in Kingston, and participated in the 2004 Athens games at the age of 19 in the women's 100 meters and women's 4 x 100 meters, medaling gold in the relay. Simpson took place in the ninth heat during the August 15 qualification round, placing third out of the nine athletes in her heat with a time of 11.48 seconds. She ranked behind Barbados' Jade Latoya Bailey (11.46 seconds), who placed second, and Evgeniya Polyakova (11.24 seconds), who placed first. Ukraine's Natalia Pogrebniak placed behind Simpson (11.60 seconds). Overall, she tied Saint Kitts and Nevis' Virgil Hodge for 28th place out of 85 people. Simpson progressed to the quarterfinals

During the quarterfinals which took place on August 16, Sherone Simpson participated in the second heat, which included eight athletes. She placed first after achieving a time of 11.02 seconds, defeating Muna Lee (11.08 seconds) and Bahamian sprinter Chandra Sturrup (11.16 seconds). 40 people advanced to quarterfinals, and Simpson placed second between Stewart (10.98 seconds) and Fraser (11.06 seconds), fellow Jamaicans who respectively placed first and third. She advanced to the semifinals.

Simpson participated in the first heat of the August 17 semifinals, which also included eight athletes. She placed fourth after finishing the race in 11.11 seconds. The Bahamas' Sturrup placed behind her (11.22 seconds), while the United States' Lauryn Williams placed ahead (11.10 seconds). Overall, of the 16 semifinalists, Simpson placed fifth; she placed lower than the other Jamaican athletes in the event during this round, but progressed to the finals. While at the final round, Simpson tied Kerron Stewart for second place, taking the silver medal alongside her with a time of 10.98 seconds. Shelly-Ann Frazer of Jamaica ranked ahead of the two of them for the gold medal (10.78 seconds), while American sprinter Williams ranked behind them (11.03 seconds).

Kerron Stewart also participated in the women's 100 meters for Jamaica at the Beijing Olympics. Born in Saint Andrew Parish in east-central Jamaica, Stewart participated in the first Olympic game in which she had participated, and was 24 at the time. Stewart participated in the tenth (and last) heat of the August 15 qualification round, placing first out of its nine athletes with a time of 11.28 seconds. She ranked ahead of Norway's Ezinne Okparaebo (11.32 seconds) and Laverne Jones of the United States Virgin Islands (11.41 seconds), who respectively ranked second and third in the heat. Stewart ranked fifth out of the 85 qualification round athletes. She progressed to the quarterfinals.

Stewart participated in the fourth heat during the August 16 quarterfinal round. With a time of 10.98 seconds, she ranked first out of the eight athletes, defeating Lauryn Williams (11.07 seconds) and Belgium's Kim Gevaert (11.10 seconds). Of the 40 people who advanced to the quarterfinals, Stewart ranked first ahead of the other two Jamaican sprinters in the event. She progressed to the semifinals.

During the semifinals, which took place on August 17, Stewart competed in the second heat. She again took first in the heat with a time of 11.05 seconds. Behind Stewart ranked the United States' Torri Edwards (11.18 seconds) and Great Britain's Jeanette Kwakye (11.19 seconds). Overall, 16 people advanced from quarterfinals to semifinals. Kerron Stewart ranked second place behind Fraser. She progressed to the final round, where she tied Sherone Simpson for second place with a time of 10.98 seconds. Fraser ranked ahead of them with a gold medal (10.78 seconds), while Lauryn Williams ranked behind the two of them (11.03 seconds).

==== Women's 100 meters hurdles ====
Vonette Dixon participated in the women's 100 meters hurdles on Jamaica's behalf. She was born in Manchester Parish in Jamaica's north, and participated in Beijing at age 32. Her appearance in Beijing marked the first time she had ever participated in an Olympic event or games. During the August 17 preliminary round, Dixon participated in the second heat alongside seven other hurdlers. Dixon finished the race in 12.69 seconds, placing first ahead of Canada's Priscilla Lopes-Schliep (12.75 seconds) and the United States' Damu Cherry (12.92 seconds). Of the 39 athletes who finished the preliminary round, Dixon tied Jamaica's Bridgitte Foster-Hylton for third place. She advanced to the semifinals.

During the August 18 semifinal round, Dixon participated in the second heat against seven other athletes. Of the other athletes, five finished the race. Dixon ranked fifth out of the six finishing athletes with a time of 12.86 seconds, defeating France's Reïna-Flor Okori (13.05 seconds) but falling behind Great Britain's Sarah Claxton (12.84 seconds). Her heat was led by American hurdlers Damu Cherry (12.62 seconds) and Dawn Harper (12.66 seconds). The Jamaican hurdler tied Spain's Josephine Nnkiruka Onyia for ninth place out of the 14 finishing semifinalists. She was the only Jamaican in the event who did not advance to the final round.

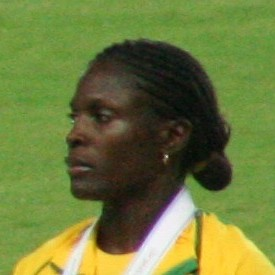
Delloreen Ennis-London was one of Jamaica's participants in the 100 meters hurdles

Delloreen Ennis-London was a representative of Jamaica in the women's 100 meters hurdles race at the 2008 Beijing Olympics. Born in the Saint Catherine Parish town of Macca Tree, Ennis-London was 25 years old at the time of her Olympic debut at the 2000 Sydney Olympics. She represented Jamaica again in Athens during the 2004 Summer Olympics at age 29, and was 33 years old at the time of her Beijing races. During the August 17 preliminary round, Ennis-London participated in the third heat against seven other athletes. She finished first in that race after completing it in 12.82 seconds, placing ahead of Australia's Sally McLellan (12.83 seconds) and Great Britain's Sarah Claxton (12.97 seconds). Overall, the Jamaican hurdler ranked in eighth place out of the 39 finishing athletes. She advanced to the semifinals.

During the August 18 semifinals, Deloreen Ennis-London participated in the first heat, again against seven other athletes. She finished the race in 12.67 seconds, ranking second behind the United States' Lolo Jones (12.43 seconds) and ahead of Canada's Priscilla Lopes-Schliep (12.68 seconds). Overall, Ennis-London ranked fourth out of the 14 finishing athletes, and was the fastest of the three Jamaicans participating in the semifinal round. She advanced to the finals, which took place on August 19. During the last race, Ennis-London tied the United States' Damu Cherry's fourth-place score (12.65 seconds) behind McIellan and Lopes-Schliep, who medaled with a time of 12.64 seconds. Fellow Jamaican Bridgitte Foster-Hylton placed sixth behind Ennis-London (12.66 seconds).

Brigitte Foster-Hylton also participated for Jamaica in the women's 100 meters hurdles. She was born in Saint Elizabeth Parish, which stretches far inland from most of Jamaica's southwestern coastline, and has been affiliated with the MVP Track and Field Club in the capital city of Kingston. Foster-Hylton's Olympic career began with her participation in the women's 100 meters hurdles at the 2000 Sydney games, when she was 25 years old, and continued in the same event in Athens at age 29. Her appearance in Beijing marked her third performance in the Olympic event. During the August 17 preliminary round, Foster-Hylton raced in the fifth heat against seven finishing athletes. Six of those athletes finished in her heat, with Foster-Hylton leading it after achieving a time of 12.69 seconds. The Jamaican hurdler defeated American Dawn Harper (12.73 seconds) and Kazakh Anastassiya Pilipenko (12.99 seconds), tying fellow Jamaican Vonnette Dixon for third place of the 39 finishing athletes. Foster-Hylton progressed to the semifinals.

The August 18 semifinal round placed Foster-Hylton in the second heat, which included both Vonnette Dixon and Dawn Harper. Overall, Foster-Hylton placed third of the six heat athletes who finished, defeating Great Britain's Sarah Claxton (12.84 seconds) but falling behind Harper (12.66 seconds). The heat itself was led by American hurdler Damu Cherry (12.62 seconds). Of the 14 athletes who finished their semifinal races, Foster-Hylton placed seventh. She advanced to the final round. During the August 19 final race, the Foster-Hylton placed sixth with a time of 12.66 seconds. She displaced Great Britain's Claxton (12.94 seconds), who placed eighth, but not Jamaica's Delloreen Ennis-London, who placed fifth (12.65 seconds).

==== Women's 200 meters ====
Sherone Simpson also participated in the women's 200 meters dash. During the August 18 qualification round, Simpson competed in the sixth heat, which included eight athletes. She completed the qualification race in 22.94 seconds, placing second of the eight competitors. Ukraine's Nataliia Pygyda placed first, ahead of Simpson, at 22.94 seconds. Cuba's Roxana Díaz placed directly behind the Jamaican sprinter with a time of 23.09 seconds. Of the 46 athletes who finished the women's 200 meters, Simpson placed sixth. She advanced to the quarterfinals.

During quarterfinals, Simpson competed in the fourth heat, which also included eight athletes. The quarterfinals took place on August 19. With a time of 22.60 seconds, Simpson placed ahead of the United States' Muna Lee (22.83 seconds), who placed second, and Great Britain's Emily Freeman (22.95 seconds), who placed third. 31 athletes progressed from qualifications to quarterfinals; Simpson placed first overall, having finished the event some 0.04 seconds ahead of fellow Jamaican Veronica Campbell and 0.14 seconds ahead of Kerron Stewart, who also represented Jamaica. Simpson progressed to the semifinal round.

The August 20 semifinals included Sherone Simpson in the second heat. The Jamaican athlete tied the United States' Marshevet Hooker for second place out of the heat's eight athletes, finishing the race in a time of 22.50 seconds. The Cayman Islands' Cydonie Mothersille placed behind Simpson and Hooker with a time of 22.61 seconds, while the United States' Allyson Felix placed first in the heat with a time of 22.33 seconds. 16 athletes advanced to the semifinals, and Simpson tied Hooker, who placed fifth. The Jamaican runner advanced to the final round. On August 21, Simpson competed in the last race of the Olympics. She finished in sixth place with a time of 22.36 seconds, ahead of the Bahamas' Debbie Ferguson-McKenzie (22.61 seconds) and behind Marshevet Hooker (22.34 seconds). She was the only Jamaican who did not win a medal in the event at Beijing.

Kerron Stewart also participated on Jamaica's behalf in the women's 200 meters dash. During the August 18 qualifications, Stewart took part in the fourth heat, which included eight athletes. She finished her part in the event's first races with a time of 23.03 seconds, placing third. Romania's Ionela Târlea placed immediately behind the Jamaican athlete (23.03 seconds), while Great Britain's Emily Freeman ranked second, ahead of Stewart (22.95 seconds). Bahrain's Roqaya Al Ghasara led Stewart's heat with a time of 22.81 seconds. Of the 46 athletes who completed the qualification races, Stewart placed tenth. She advanced to the quarterfinals.

The August 19 quarterfinals placed Stewart in the third heat, which included eight other athletes. Stewart finished her race in 22.74 seconds, ranking in second place ahead of the United States' Marshevet Hooker (22.76 seconds) and behind Russian sprinter Yuliya Chermoshanskaya, who ranked first in the event and defeated Stewart (22.63 seconds). 31 athletes who advanced to the quarterfinals finished their races. Of those, Stewart tied American sprinter Allyson Felix for fourth place. She was the slowest of the three Jamaican athletes participating in the quarterfinals. The Jamaican sprinter advanced to the semifinals.

The semifinal round of the women's 200 meters took place on August 20, where Stewart participated in the eight-person first heat. At the end of the race, she placed second, finishing with a time of 22.29 seconds. The United States' Muna Lee finished with the same time as Stewart. Bahamian runner Debbie Ferguson-McKenzie ranked behind Stewart and Lee (22.51 seconds), while fellow Jamaican Veronica Campbell placed ahead of them to take first in the heat (22.19 seconds). Stewart took second out of the 16 athletes who advanced to the semifinal round. She advanced to finals. During the last round, Stewart took the bronze medal when she finished the race with a time of 22.00 seconds. Muna Lee placed fourth (22.01 seconds), while Allyson Felix won the silver medal (21.93 seconds).

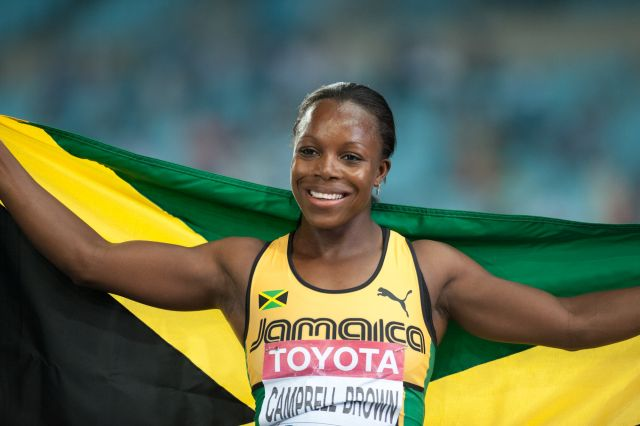
Veronica Campbell-Brown won the gold medal in the 200 meters race

Veronica Campbell-Brown represented Jamaica for the third consecutive Olympic Games. Born in Clark's Town, a small settlement in the inland reaches of Trelawny Parish, which lies on the north coast, Campbell-Brown was 18 during her Olympic debut in Sydney, where she was part of the silver medal-winning women's 4 x 100 meters relay. In the 2004 Athens Olympics, when Campbell-Brown was 22 years old, she participated in the women's 100 meters; the women's 200 meters; and the women's 4 x 100 meters relay again. She won a bronze medal in the first, and gold medal in the latter two. Having previously won a total of four medals, Campbell-Brown returned to the Olympics to participate in the women's 200 meters dash. During the August 18 qualification round, Campbell-Brown was placed in the fifth heat, which included eight athletes. She placed first in the heat with a time of 23.04 seconds, displacing Malinese runner Kadiatou Camara (23.06 second) and Russia's Natalia Rusakova (23.21 seconds). Of the 46 finishing athletes, Campbell-Brown tied Sri Lanka's Susanthika Jayasinghe for 11th place. She was the slowest of the Jamaican athletes in the qualification round. Campbell-Brown advanced to the quarterfinals.

Veronica Campbell-Brown participated in the first heat of the August 19 quarterfinal round. Seven athletes finished the heat, with Campbell-Brown placing first after achieving a time of 22.64 seconds. The Jamaican sprinter displaced Allyson Felix (22.74 seconds), who took second place, and the Bahamas' Debbie Ferguson-McKenzie (22.77 seconds), who took third place. 31 advancing athletes finished the quarterfinal races, Campbell-Brown placed third. She was the second-fastest Jamaican athlete in the heat, displacing Kerron Stewart (22.74 seconds) but not Sherone Simpson (22.60 seconds). Campbell-Brown advanced to the semifinals.

At the semifinals, which took place on August 20, Campbell-Brown raced in the first heat. She competed against seven other athletes, including Kerron Stewart. Finishing the day's event in 22.19 seconds, Campbell-Brown placed first in the heat; Stewart placed directly behind her (22.29 seconds), tying Muna Lee of the United States. She ranked first out of the event's 16 semifinalists. She progressed to the final round. At the finals, which took place on August 21, Campbell-Brown won the third gold medal of her Olympic career after taking a time of 21.74 seconds. Allyson Felix took the silver medal (21.93 seconds), while Stewart took bronze (22.00 seconds).

==== Women's 400 meters ====
Rosemarie Whyte participated for the Jamaican team in Beijing in the women's 400 meters dash. She attended GC Foster College, which is located in the former Jamaican capital of Spanish Town, and participated in the Beijing Olympics at age 21. Whyte had not previously competed in any Olympic Games. During the August 16 qualification round, Whyte competed in the first heat against six other athletes. With a time of 51.00 seconds, she ranked first in the heat ahead of the Bahamas' Christine Amertil (51.25 seconds) and Nigeria's Ajoke Odumosu (51.39 seconds). Of the 50 athletes, Whyte tied Great Britain's Christine Ohuruogu for seventh place. She advanced to the next round.

During the August 17 semifinals, Whyte participated in the third heat. Seven other athletes participated in her heat. Having finished her race in 50.63 seconds, Whyte placed third in the heat, defeating Great Britain's Nicola Sanders (50.71 seconds) but falling behind Botswana's Amantle Montsho (50.54 seconds), who placed second, and Russia's Yulia Gushchina (50.48 seconds), who placed first. 24 athletes progressed to the semifinals, and Whyte ranked eighth. She advanced to the finals. During the August 19 final race, Rosemarie Whyte placed seventh with a time of 50.68 seconds. Montsho ranked eighth behind her (51.18 seconds), while Russia's Tatiana Firova ranked sixth ahead of her (50.11 seconds).

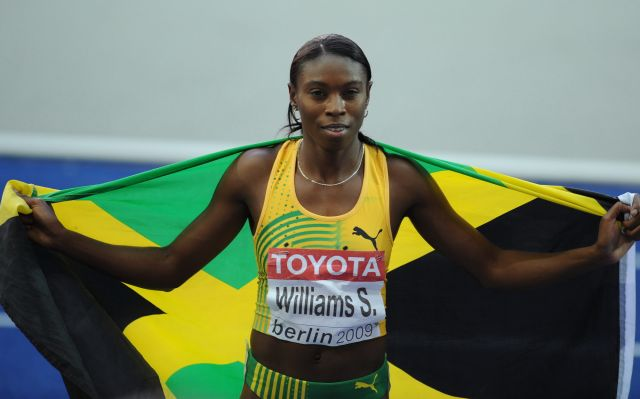
Shericka Williams won the silver medal in the women's 400 meters race

Shericka Williams participated on Jamaica's track and field team in Beijing. One of her events included the women's 400 meters race. She was born in Black River, a major Jamaican port that serves as the capital of Saint Elizabeth Parish, and took part in the MVP Track and Field Club based in Kingston. Williams participated in the Beijing Olympics at age 22, and had not previously competed in any Olympic Games. During the seventh heat of the August 16 qualification round, Williams competed against seven other athletes. She placed first with a time of 50.57 seconds, defeating Russia's Tatiana Firova (50.59 seconds) and Zambia's Racheal Nachula (51.62 seconds). Of the 50 athletes finishing the qualification round, Williams placed second. She advanced to the semifinals.

Shericka Williams participated in the first heat of the semifinal round, which took place on August 17. She completed the event in 50.28 seconds, defeating Russia's Firova (50.31 sends) but falling short of the time of Great Britain's Christine Ohuruogu (50.14 seconds). 24 athletes competed in the semifinal round. Williams placed third ahead of all other Jamaican athletes in the event. She advanced to the final round, where she medaled silver with a time of 49.69 seconds behind gold medalist Ohuruogu (49.62 seconds) and ahead of the United States' bronze medalist Sanya Richards (49.93 seconds).

Novlene Williams (or Novelene Williams) also participated for the Jamaican Olympic team in the women's 400 meters. Born in the northerly Saint Ann Parish, she attended the University of Florida. Novlene Williams participated in the 2004 Athens Olympics as a 22-year-old, marking her Olympic debut as she participated in both the women's 400 meters and the women's 4 x 400 meters relay. She won a bronze medal along with her relay members, and competed in those same events in Beijing as a 26-year-old. During the August 16 qualification round, Williams participated against seven other athletes in the sixth heat. She took first in the heat with a time of 51.52 seconds, displacing Great Britain's Nicola Sanders (51.81 seconds) and Sudan's Nawal El Jack (52.77 seconds). 50 competitors took part in the qualification round, and Williams placed 16th overall. She advanced to the semifinals.

Novlene Williams participated in the second heat of the August 17 semifinal round, competing against seven other athletes. She placed third in the heat with a time of 51.06 seconds, displacing Bahamian sprinter Christine Amertil (51.51 seconds). However, Russia's Anastasia Kapachinskaya ranked second, ahead of Williams (50.30 seconds), while American runner Sanya Richards took first (49.90 seconds). Of the 24 athletes who progressed to the semifinal round, Novlene Williams ranked 12th. She was the only Jamaican in the event who did not reach the finals.

==== Women's 400 meters hurdles ====
Melaine Walker competed for Jamaica in the women's 400 meters hurdles. Born in Kingston, Walker has participated in the MVP Track and Field Club that is based in the city of her birth. She participated in Beijing at age 25, entering only in the women's 400 meters hurdles. Walker had not previously competed in any Olympic Games. During the third heat of the August 17 qualification round, which encompassed the performances of seven athletes, Walker placed first with a time of 54.56 seconds. The Ukraine's Anastasiya Rabchenyuk ranked behind Walker in second place (55.18 seconds) and third-place finalist Cvetelina Kirilova of Bulgaria (55.22 seconds). Of the 27 people who participated in the event's qualification round, the Jamaican hurdler placed first. She progressed to the semifinals.

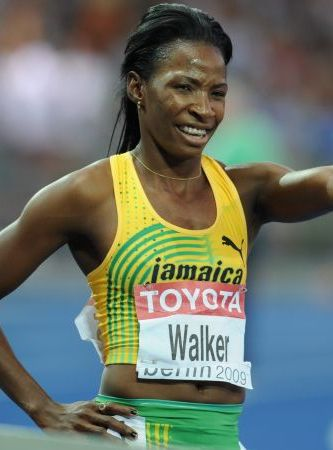
Melaine Walker won the gold medal in the 400 meters hurdles.

Walker competed next in the August 18 second semifinal heat, which included eight athletes (among others, Rabchenyuk and Kirilova). She placed first again in her heat with a time of 54.20 seconds, defeating Rabchenyuk in second place (54.60 seconds) and the United States' Tiffany Ross-Williams (54.99 seconds). 16 athletes advanced to semifinals, including another Jamaican (Nickiesha Wilson). Of those, Walker placed second, behind only the United States' Sheena Williams (54.07 seconds). She advanced to the final round. During the August 20 final race, Walker took the gold medal with a time of 52.64 seconds. She placed ahead of Johnson, who won silver (53.70 seconds) and Great Britain's Tasha Danvers, who won bronze (53.84 seconds). She was the only of the three participating Jamaicans who progressed to the final round.

Nickiesha Wilson also participated for Jamaica in the women's 400 meters hurdles event. Born in Kingston, Wilson participated in the athletics program at Louisiana State University in Baton Rouge, Louisiana and participated in the Beijing Olympics at age 22. Wilson had not previously participated in any Olympic Games or events. During the August 17 qualification round, Wilson was placed in the second heat and placed third out of the heat's seventh athletes after finishing the race in 55.75 seconds. Wilson placed ahead of Romania's Angela Moroșanu (56.07 seconds) and behind Russia's Anastasia Ott (55.34 seconds). The heat itself was led by Great Britain's Tasha Danvers (55.19 seconds). Of the 27 athletes participating in the qualification round, Wilson ranked tenth. She advanced to the semifinals.

During the second heat of the August 18 semifinal round, Wilson competed in the first heat. She faced seven other athletes, placing fifth with a time of 54.67 seconds. Wilson placed ahead of Ott, who also placed behind her in her previous heat (54.74 seconds), and behind Poland's Anna Jesień (54.36 seconds). The heat was led by American hurdler Sheena Johnson (54.07 seconds), who placed first, and Danvers (54.31 seconds), who placed second. Of the 16 athletes, Nickiesha Wilson placed seventh. She did not advance to the final round.

Shevon Stoddart participated for Jamaica at the Beijing Olympics as a competitor in the women's 400 meters hurdles. Born in Jamaica, Stoddart was an athlete at the University of South Carolina in Columbia who participated in the women's 400 meters hurdles at the 2004 Athens Olympics at age 21. She did not advance past the qualification round in that event. During the Beijing Olympics, Stoddart was 25, and competed in the same event again. During the August 17 qualification round, she competed in the first heat, which included six athletes. Stoddart placed fourth with a time of 56.52 seconds, defeating Latvia's Ieva Zunda (57.43 seconds) but falling behind Japan's Satomi Kubokura (55.82 seconds). The heat was led by the United States' Tiffany Ross-Williams (55.51 seconds) and Russia's Irina Obedina (55.71 seconds). Of the 27 athletes participating in the qualification heats, Stoddard ranked 17th. She did not advance to later rounds.

==== Women's 800 meters ====
Kenia Sinclair was the only Jamaican athlete participating in the women's 800 meters race during the Beijing Olympics. She was born in Saint Catherine Parish, and participated in the Olympics in Beijing at age 28. She had not been previously involved in any Olympic Games. During the third heat of the August 14 qualification round, Sinclair ranked second in a heat of seven athletes after achieving a time of 2:03.76. She placed ahead of France's Élodie Guégan (2:03.85), but behind Kenya's Pamela Jelimo (2:03.18), the heat's leader. 40 athletes finished their events during the qualification round, with Sinclair ranking 31st. She progressed to semifinals.

The semifinal round took place on August 16, during which Kenia Sinclair participated in the third heat. She completed the event in 1:58.28 and placed fourth of the seven finishing athletes. Guegan, who placed third in Sinclair's qualification heat, did not finish the heat; Italy's Elisa Cusma Piccione placed behind Sinclair (1:58.28) and Russia's Tatiana Andrianova placed ahead (1:58.16) in a heat led by Kenya's Janeth Jepkosgei Busienei (1:57.28) and the Ukraine's Yuliya Krevsun (1:57.32). 23 athletes finished the semifinal round, with Sinclair placing sixth and advancing to the final round. During the final August 18 race, Sinclair placed sixth after finishing the event in 1:58.24. Krevsun ranked behind her (1:58.73), while Mozambique's Maria Mutola placed fifth ahead of the Jamaican hurdler (1:57.68).

==== Women's 3,000 meters steeplechase ====
Korene Hinds participated in the women's 3000 meters steeplechase, an obstacle run event. Born in the former Jamaican capital of Spanish Town, Hinds participated in Beijing at age 31. She had not previously participated in any Olympic events. During the August 15 qualification round, Hinds was placed in the third heat, which was composed of 17 athletes. She was the only Jamaican in the heat. However, Hinds did not finish the race, and was one of three athletes in the heat (along with Brazil's Zenaide Vieira and Bulgaria's Dobrinka Shalamanova) do have not done so.

Mardrea Hyman also competed in the women's 3,000 meters steeplechase on Jamaica's behalf. Born in Manchester Parish, Hyman was 27 at the time she participated in the women's 1,500 meters race at the 2000 Sydney Olympics. She did not participate at the Athens games in 2004, but returned to the Olympics in Beijing at age 35, this time participating in the steeplechase event. She was placed in the second heat of the August 15 qualification round, which included 17 athletes. However, Hyman was the only athlete in her heat who did not finish the race.

==== Women's long jump ====
Chelsea Hammond competed as Jamaica's only female long jumper at the Beijing Olympics. Hammond was born in New York City, and participated in Beijing when she was 25 years old. She had not previously competed in any Olympic event. During the course of the August 18 qualifying round, the Jamaican long jumper competed in the first heat against 20 other athletes. Her best mark in the event was 6.60 meters, ranking seventh out of the 19 heat athletes who finished. Greece's Chrysopigi Devetzi ranked immediately behind her (6.60 meters), while the United States' Funmilayo Jimoh ranked ahead of her (6.61 meters). The leaders of Hammond's heat included Brazil's Maurren Higa Maggi (6.79 meters) and Sweden's Carolina Klüft (670 meters). Of the 38 finishing athletes overall, Hammond ranked 11th and progressed to the final round.

On August 22, Chelsea Hammond challenged eleven other athletes in the final competition of the event. The Jamaican marked her best distance at 6.79 meters, placing fourth overall in the event. The United States' Brittney Reese placed fifth behind Chelsea (6.76 meters), while Nigeria's Blessing Okagbare ranked ahead and won the bronze medal (6.91 seconds).

In 2017, retests showed Tatyana Lebedeva of Russia had a positive test for turinabol and was disqualified from her silver medals. In 2018 Chelsea Hammond was advanced to bronze.

==== Women's triple jump ====
Trecia-Kaye Smith participated in the women's triple jump event on Jamaica's behalf in Beijing, and was the only female triple jumper who participated for Jamaica those Games. Born in Westmoreland Parish, the westernmost region of Jamaica, Smith was a part of the London-based Shaftesbury Barnet Harriers athletic club and debuted in the 2004 Athens Olympics at age 28 representing Jamaica in the same event and falling one place short of the bronze medal. She returned to the Olympics at age 32. Trecia-Kaye Smith participated in the second heat of the August 15 qualifying round, facing 17 other athletes. She jumped a distance of 14.18 meters, placing seventh out of the 15 athletes who finished the heat. Romania's Adelina Gavrilă placed behind her (13.98 meters), while Estonia's Kaire Leibak placed ahead (14.19 meters). Smith's heat was led by Greece's Chrysopigi Devetzi (14.92 meters) and Russia's Tatyana Lebedeva (14.55 meters). Overall, Smith ranked 12th of the 32 finishing athletes. She advanced to the final round.

Smith faced eleven other athletes during the final heat of the women's Olympic triple jump event. The Jamaican jumped 14.12 meters, placing 11th. China's Xie Limei ranked directly behind Smith (14.09 meters), while Estonia's Leibak ranked ahead (14.13 meters). The leaders of the heat included gold medalist Françoise Mbango Etone of Cameroon (15.39 meters), silver medalist Lebedeva (15.32 meters), and bronze medalist Devetzi (15.23 meters).

==== Women's shot put ====
Zara Northover represented Jamaica at the Beijing Olympics as its only female shot putter of the games. Born in Fort Lauderdale, Florida, and an athlete affiliated with Northeastern University in Boston, Northover participated for in Beijing at the age of 24. She had not previously competed in any Olympic Games. During the August 15 qualification round, Northover was placed in the second heat. She competed against 16 other athletes. Northover put the shot 15.85 meters, placing last out of the 16 finishing athletes in her heat. Georgia's Mariami Kevkhishvili-Machavariani placed ahead of her (15.99 meters). Her heat was led by China's Gong Lijiao (19.46 meters) and Belarus' Nadzeya Ostapchuk (19.08 meters). Overall, Northover ranked 31st of the 33 athletes who completed the qualification round. She did not advance to the finals the next day.

==== Women's javelin throw ====
Olivia McKoy represented Jamaica as its only javelin thrower at the Beijing Olympics. She was born in Clarendon Parish, which lies in central Jamaica and stretches southwards to the island's southernmost point, and debuted at the 2000 Sydney Olympics by participating in the same event for the same country at age 26. Although McKoy did not compete in Athens in 2004, she returned in Beijing at the age of 34. During the August 18 qualifying round, McKoy participated in the second heat. 26 other athletes competed in her group, and she ranked 17th of them after throwing the javelin 55.51 meters. Overall, McKoy ranked 34th out of the 52 athletes who finished the event. She did not advance to the final round.

==== Women's 4 × 100 meters relay ====
Jamaica sent a team to participate in the women's 4 x 100 meters relay at the Beijing Olympics. During the first round, the Jamaican relay included two competitors who previously participated in individual events (Shelly-Ann Fraser, who won the gold medal in the women's 100 meters, and Veronica Campbell-Brown, who also won the gold medal in the women's 200 meters). The two other heat competitors included Aleen Bailey, who was born in Islington, Saint Mary Parish on Jamaica's northeast coast and previously medaled gold in the women's 4 x 100 meters relay at the 2004 Athens Olympics at 23 years old; and Sheri-Ann Brooks, who was born in Kingston and competed for the first time at an Olympics in the Jamaican 4 x 100 meters relay at Beijing at age 25. Together, the four athletes competed in the second heat of the August 21 semifinal (first) round against seven other relays. Three of those relays did not finish. Of the remaining five, Jamaica's relay ranked first with a time of 42.24 seconds. The Russian relay ranked behind them (42.87 seconds), and the German relay ranked behind Russia's (42.87 seconds). Of the 11 finishing relays, Jamaica's was the fastest. They progressed to the final round.

The final round occurred on August 22. In this relay, Aleen Bailey and Sheri-Ann Brooks were replaced by two athletes who had previously competed in individual events (Kerron Stewart, who medaled silver in the women's 100 meters, and medaled bronze in the women's 200 meters, and Sherone Simpson, who also medaled silver in the women's 100 meters). Veronica Campbell-Brown and Shelly-Ann Fraser remained in the relay. However, the Jamaican relay was one of the three relays in the final round that did not finish the race (the others being the British and Polish relays).

==== Women's 4 × 400 meters relay ====
Jamaica sent a team to participate in the women's 4 x 400 meters. Of the team that participated in the semifinal (first) round of the event, Novlene Williams and Shericka Williams also participated in the women's 400 meters individual race, with Shericka Williams winning the silver medal. Bobby-Gaye Wilkins, born in Manchester Parish, was 19 at the time of her participation in the Beijing Olympics; during her first Olympic appearance, she took part in the event's first round. 25-year-old Clarendon Parish native Shereefa Lloyd also debuted at the Olympics with her participation in the relay's first round. During the course of August 22 first round, Jamaica participated in the second heat, where it placed second out of eight relays with a time of 3:22.60. While placing ahead of the third-place Belarusian team (3:22.78), Jamaica's relay fell behind the American relay, which took first in the heat (3:22.45). Overall, the Jamaican relay placed second of the 16 relays in the event. It advanced to the final round.

The August 23 final round encompassed eight relay teams, including the Jamaican relay. Bobby-Gaye Wilkins was replaced by Rosemarie Whyte, who previously competed in the women's 400 meters individual event, placing seventh in its final round. The relay completed the race in 3:20.40. In doing so, it won the bronze medal, again defeating the Belarusian relay (3:21.85), which placed fourth, but falling behind the silver-medalist Russian team (3:18.82) and the gold-medalist American team (3:18.54).

==== Summary ====
24 athletes competed in the women's track and field team that Jamaica sent to the Beijing Olympics in 2008. Of those, nine athletes participated only in individual track events (Dixon, Ennis-London, Foster-Hylton, Stoddart, Walker, Wilson, Sinclair, Hinds, Hyman), four participated only in relay track events (Bailey, Brooks, Willkins, Lloyd), seven competed in both individual and relay track events (Fraser, Simpson, Stewart, Campbell, Whyte, N. Williams, S. Williams), and four competed in field events (Hammond, Smith, Northover, McKoy). Of the 11 medals won in Beijing by Jamaican athletes, eight of them were won by female track athletes. Three gold medals were won, with one each by Shelly-Ann Fraser (100 meters), Veronica Campbell (200 meters), and Melaine Walker (400 meters hurdles). Three silver medals were also won, with one received by Sherone Simpson (100 meters), Kerron Stewart (100 meters), and Shericka Williams (400 meters). Bronze medals were won by Kerron Stewart (200 meters) and a relay team that included Bobby-Gaye Wilkins, Shereefa Lloyd, Rosemarie Whyte, Novlene Williams, and Shericka Williams (4 x 400 meters relay).

Key

- Note–Ranks given for track events are within the athlete's heat only
- Q = Qualified for the next round
- q = Qualified for the next round as a fastest loser or, in field events, by position without achieving the qualifying target
- NR = National record
- N/A = Round not applicable for the event
- Bye = Athlete not required to compete in round

Women
Track & road events

| Athlete | Event | Heat | | Quarterfinal | | Semifinal | | Final | |
| Athlete | Event | Result | Rank | Result | Rank | Result | Rank | Result | Rank |
|---|---|---|---|---|---|---|---|---|---|
| Shelly-Ann Fraser | 100 m | 11.35 | 1 Q | 11.06 | 1 Q | 11.00 | 1 Q | 10.78 | 1st place, gold medalist(s) |
| Sherone Simpson | 100 m | 11.48 | 3 Q | 11.02 | 1 Q | 11.11 | 4 Q | 10.98 | 2nd place, silver medalist(s) |
| Kerron Stewart | 100 m | 11.28 | 1 Q | 10.98 | 1 Q | 11.05 | 1 Q | 10.98 | 2nd place, silver medalist(s) |
| Veronica Campbell-Brown | 200 m | 23.04 | 1 Q | 22.64 | 1 Q | 22.19 | 1 Q | 21.74 | 1st place, gold medalist(s) |
| Sherone Simpson | 200 m | 22.94 | 2 Q | 22.60 | 1 Q | 22.50 | 3 Q | 22.36 | 6 |
| Kerron Stewart | 200 m | 23.03 | 3 Q | 22.74 | 2 Q | 22.29 | 2 Q | 22.00 | 3rd place, bronze medalist(s) |
| Rosemarie Whyte | 400 m | 51.00 | 1 Q | —N/a | | 50.63 | 3 q | 50.68 | 7 |
| Novlene Williams | 400 m | 51.52 | 1 Q | —N/a | | 51.06 | 3 | Did not advance | |
| Shericka Williams | 400 m | 50.57 | 1 Q | —N/a | | 50.58 | 2 Q | 49.69 | 2nd place, silver medalist(s) |
| Kenia Sinclair | 800 m | 2:03.76 | 2 Q | —N/a | | 1:58.28 | 4 q | 1:58.24 | 6 |
| Vonette Dixon | 100 m hurdles | 12.69 | 1 Q | —N/a | | 12.86 | 5 | Did not advance | |
| Delloreen Ennis-London | 100 m hurdles | 12.82 | 1 Q | —N/a | | 12.67 | 2 Q | 12.65 | 5 |
| Brigitte Foster-Hylton | 100 m hurdles | 12.69 | 1 Q | —N/a | | 12.79 | 3 Q | 12.66 | 6 |
| Shevon Stoddart | 400 m hurdles | 56.52 | 4 | —N/a | | Did not advance | | | |
| Melaine Walker | 400 m hurdles | 54.46 | Q 1 | —N/a | | 54.20 | Q 2 | 52.64 OR | 1st place, gold medalist(s) |
| Nickiesha Wilson | 400 m hurdles | 55.75 | 3 Q | —N/a | | 54.67 | 5 | Did not advance | |
| Korene Hinds | 3000 m steplechase | DNF | | —N/a | | | | Did not advance | |
| Mardrea Hyman | 3000 m steplechase | DNF | | —N/a | | | | Did not advance | |
| Aleen Bailey*; Sheri-Ann Brooks*; Veronica Campbell-Brown; Shelly-Ann Fraser; Sherone Simpson; Kerron Stewart | 4 × 100 m relay | 42.24 | 1 Q | —N/a | | | | DNF | |
| Shereefa Lloyd; Rosemarie Whyte**; Bobby-Gaye Wilkins*; Novlene Williams; Shericka Williams | 4 × 400 m relay | 3:22.60 | 2 Q | —N/a | | | | 3:20.40 | 2nd place, silver medalist(s) |

* Competed in heats only; ** Competed in finals only

Field events

| Athlete | Event | Qualification | | Final | |
| Athlete | Event | Distance | Position | Distance | Position |
|---|---|---|---|---|---|
| Chelsea Hammond | Long jump | 6.60 | 12 q | 6.79 | 3rd place, bronze medalist(s) |
| Olivia McKoy | Javelin throw | 55.51 | 34 | Did not advance | |
| Zara Northover | Shot put | 15.85 | 31 | Did not advance | |
| Trecia Smith | Triple jump | 14.18 | 12 Q | 14.12 | 11 |

== Cycling ==
Ricardo Lynch represented Jamaica as its sole cyclist at the Beijing Olympics. Born in 1984, Lynch was 23 years old at the time of his participation in Beijing, representing the Caribbean island in the men's keirin event. He had not previously competed in any Olympic Games or event. Having not initially qualified for the event, Lynch was given a second chance in the third heat of the August 15 repechage round against three other cyclists. He ranked third between the Ukraine's second place finalist Andrii Vynokurov and Russia's fourth place finalist Sergey Polynskiy. The heat leader, Kiyofumi Nagai of Japan, won the repechage heat and advanced to the next round. Lynch did not progress.

=== Track ===
Keirin

| Athlete | Event | 1st round | Repechage | 2nd round | Finals |
| Athlete | Event | Rank | Rank | Rank | Rank |
|---|---|---|---|---|---|
| Ricardo Lynch | Men's keirin | 6 R | 3 | Did not advance | |

== Equestrian ==
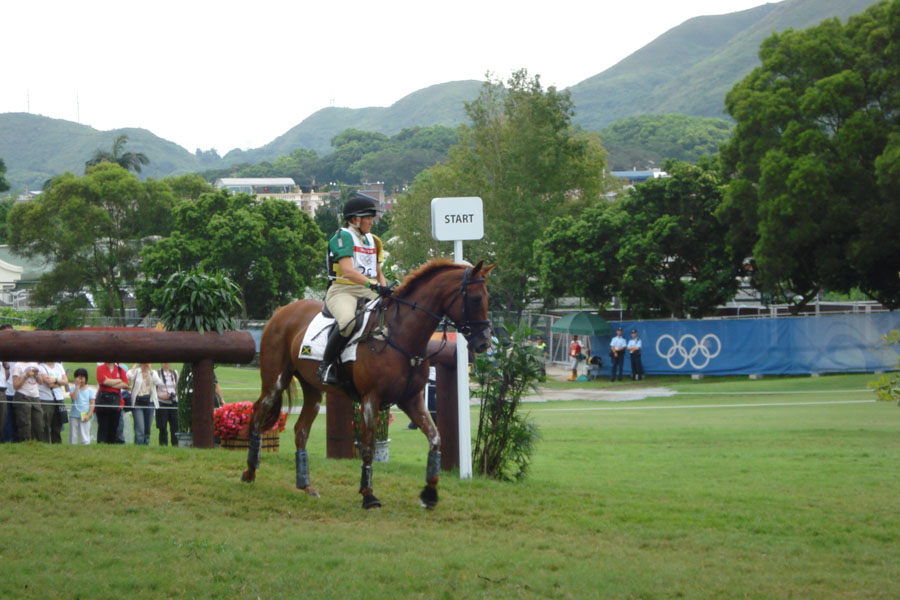
Samantha Albert and Before I Do It during the cross-country phase of their event in Hong Kong

Samantha Albert participated on Jamaica's behalf at the Beijing Olympics in an individual mixed three-day equestrian event. She was the only Jamaican participating in equestrian sports at the 2008 Olympics. Born in Montréal, Canada, Albert married Swedish equestrian Olympian Dag Albert and participated in the Beijing Olympics at age 37. At the Olympics, Albert participated first in the August 9 dressage round, which included 70 athletes in total. Out of a maximum possible score of 270, Albert and her horse Before I Do It scored 168 points on their first jump (62.22%), 171 points on their second jump (63.33%), and 167 points on their third jump (61.85%), taking 56.3 penalty points in the process. Overall, Albert and Before I Do It ranked 52nd of the 69 finishing riders, placing between France's Jean Renaud Adde (53rd place on horse Haston D'Elpegere) and Brazil's Jeferson Moreira (51st place on horse Escudeiro).

During the August 10 cross country phrase, Albert completed the obstacle course in 9 minutes and 44 seconds, but accrued a time penalty of 41.60 seconds. Rankings during this round were by penalty, and thus Albert ranked 42nd out of the 60 equestrian athletes with her score ahead of Germany's Peter Thomsen (45.60) and behind New Zealand's Joe Meyer (21.20). The final part of her Olympic event, show jumping, took place on August 12. She was the only athlete out of the 57 still in the event to be eliminated in this stage. Albert did not progress to the final jumping round, which occurred later that day.

=== Eventing ===
| Athlete | Horse | Event | Dressage | | Cross-country | | | Jumping | | | | Total | |
| Athlete | Horse | Event | Dressage | | Cross-country | | | Qualifier | | | Final | Total | |
| Athlete | Horse | Event | Penalties | Rank | Penalties | Total | Rank | Penalties | Total | Rank | Penalties | Penalties | Rank |
|---|---|---|---|---|---|---|---|---|---|---|---|---|---|
| Samantha Albert | Before I Do It | Individual | 56.30 | 52 | 41.60 | 97.90 | 42 | Did not finish | | | | | |

== Swimming ==
=== Men's competition ===
Jevon Atkinson, the eldest of the swimming Beijing Jamaicans age 24, participated in the men's 50 meters freestyle for Jamaica. He was born in Kingston and swam with the University of Western Kentucky. His appearance in Beijing marked his second time competing in the Olympics, as he participated in the same event for Jamaica at the Athens Olympics in 2004. The preliminary round of Atkinson's event took place on August 14; Atkinson was placed in the seventh heat, finishing the event in 22.83 seconds. He placed fourth out of the heat's eight competitors, defeating Kazakhstan's Stanislav Kuzmin (22.91 seconds) but falling behind Iceland's Árni Már Árnason (22.81 seconds). The heat itself was led by Chile's Oliver Elliot (22.75 seconds) and Romania's Norbert Trandafir (22.80 seconds). 97 athletes competed in the preliminary round, and Atkinson tied Kuwait's Mohammad Madwa for 45th place. He did not advance to later rounds.

=== Women's competition ===
Then 19-year-old Alia Atkinson participated in the women's 200 meters breaststroke on Jamaica's behalf. An affiliate of the Comets Swim Club in Pembroke Pines, Florida, Atkinson previously participated for Jamaica in the women's 100 meters breaststroke and the women's 50 meters freestyle while 15 years old in the 2004 Athens Olympics. The event's preliminary round, which took place on August 13, included Atkinson in the second heat. She completed the race in 2:29.53, placing second out of sixth athletes; Montenegro's Marina Kuč placed behind her (2:31.24) while Malaysia's Yi Ting Siow placed ahead (2:27.80). Out of the 40 swimmers who completed the preliminary round, Atkinson ranked 25th. She did not advance.

Swimmer Natasha Moodie competed on Jamaica's behalf in the women's 50 meters freestyle. Born in the capital city of Kingston, Moodie was 17 years old at the time of her participation in the Beijing Olympics. She had not previously competed in any Olympic event. During the August 15 preliminary round, Moodie was placed in the eighth heat, which included eight athletes. She finished the race in 25.95 meters and placed fifth out of the six athletes in her heat who finished the race. Ragnheiður Ragnarsdóttir of Iceland placed ahead of her (25.82 seconds) and Malaysia's Chii Lin Leung placed behind her (26.75 seconds), while the leaders of the heat were Israel's Anna Gostomelsky (25.23 seconds) and the Bahamas' Arianna Vanderpool-Wallace (25.40 seconds). Out of the 90 competitors who finished the race, Moodie placed 37th. She did not advance to later rounds.

Men

| Athlete | Event | Heat | | Semifinal | | Final | |
| Athlete | Event | Time | Rank | Time | Rank | Time | Rank |
|---|---|---|---|---|---|---|---|
| Jevon Atkinson | 50 m freestyle | 22.83 | =45 | Did not advance | | | |

Women

| Athlete | Event | Heat | | Semifinal | | Final | |
| Athlete | Event | Time | Rank | Time | Rank | Time | Rank |
|---|---|---|---|---|---|---|---|
| Alia Atkinson | 200 m breaststroke | 2:29.53 | 25 | Did not advance | | | |
| Natasha Moodie | 50 m freestyle | 25.95 NR | 37 | Did not advance | | | |

== See also ==
- Jamaica at the 2006 Commonwealth Games
- Jamaica at the 2007 Pan American Games
- Jamaica at the 2010 Central American and Caribbean Games
