= List of Nigerian sportspeople =

List of Nigerian sportspeople includes notable sportsman of the country.

== American football ==
- Isaiah Ekejiuba – Oakland Raiders
- Samkon Gado – St. Louis Rams
- Israel Idonije – Chicago Bears
- Amobi Okoye – Houston Texans
- Christian Okoye – Kansas City Chiefs
- Jeff Otah – Carolina Panthers
- Iheanyi Uwaezuoke – San Francisco 49ers

== Association football ==
- Karim Adeyemi
- Johnson Akuchie
- Yakubu – Guangzhou R&F
- Victor Anichebe – West Brom
- Folarin Balogun (born 2001) plays for AS Monaco and the United States national team. Born in Brooklyn, raised in London.
- Tunji Banjo
- Chibuzor Chilaka
- Christian Chukwu
- John Fashanu
- Sani Kaita
- Nwankwo Kanu – played in 1994, 1998 and 2002 World Cup finals
- Garba Lawal
- Obafemi Martins – VfL Wolfsburg
- Mikel John Obi – Chelsea F.C.
- Segun Odegbami
- Peter Odemwingie – West Bromwich Albion F.C.
- Austin "Jay-Jay" Okocha (born 1973)
- Praise Onubiyi
- Nedum Onuoha – Manchester City F.C.
- Oguchi Onyewu
- Rashidi Yekini
- Joseph Yobo – Fenerbahçe S.K.
- Michael Obafemi – Southampton
- Henry Onyekuru
- Bukayo Saka
- Kelechi Iheanacho – Leicester City

== Athletics ==
- Blessing Okagbere – track and field athlete
- Chioma Ajunwa – first Nigerian Olympic gold medalist (long jump)
- Olusoji Fasuba – sprinter

== Basketball ==
- Kenny Adeleke (born 1983) – Nigerian-American basketball player
- Giannis Antetokounmpo (born Adétòkunbọ̀ in 1994) – Nigerian-Greek 2-time NBA MVP and 2021 NBA Finals MVP for the Milwaukee Bucks. His parents are Nigerian; he was born in Athens, Greece, but did not receive Greek citizenship until 2013. According to Giannis, he and his brothers grew up in a "Nigerian home" with "no Greek culture."Holds dual-citizenship, having received his Nigerian passport in 2015.
- Thanasis Antetokounmpo (born 1992) – Nigerian-Greek, Giannis' older brother also plays for the Milwaukee Bucks. Like Giannis, Thanasis' surname was changed from the Yoruba "Adétòkunbọ̀" to the Greek transliteration "Antentokounmpo" as part of the citizenship process.
- Ogugua "OG" Anunoby Jr. (born 1997) is an English professional basketball player for the New York Knicks of the National Basketball Association (NBA) He was born in England, to Nigerian parents of Igbo descent.
- Tunji Awojobi (born 1973) – professional basketball player
- Kelenna Azubuike – Golden State Warriors
- Udoka Azubuike (born 1999) – Nigerian-American Israeli Basketball Premier League player; former University of Kansas player
- Suleiman Braimoh (born 1989) – Nigerian-American basketball player in the Israel Basketball Premier League
- Yinka Dare – New Jersey Nets
- John Egbunu (born 1994) – Nigerian-born American basketball player for Hapoel Jerusalem of the Israeli Basketball Premier League
- Obinna Ekezie (born 1975) – professional NBA basketball player
- Festus Ezeli – Golden State Warriors
- Andre Iguodala (born 1984) – Philadelphia 76ers
- Ikenna Iroegbu (born 1995), American-born Nigerian basketball player for Hapoel Galil Elyon of the Israeli Basketball Premier League
- Jayson Obazuaye (born 1984), American-Nigerian
- Derek Ogbeide (born 1997), Nigerian-Canadian basketball player for Hapoel Jerusalem in the Israeli Basketball Premier League
- Nneka Ogwumike – Los Angeles Sparks
- Emeka Okafor – Phoenix Suns
- Ike Ofoegbu (born 1984) – American-Nigerian Israeli Premier Basketball League player
- Hakeem Olajuwon, Nigerian-American NBA basketball player
- Victor Oladipo – Orlando Magic
- Michael Olowokandi (born 1975)
- Ekpe Udoh – Milwaukee Bucks
- Ime Udoka – San Antonio Spurs
- Mfon Udoka – Detroit Shock, Houston Comets, Los Angeles Sparks
- Qudus Wahab (born 2000) - basketball player for Maccabi Ashdod of the Israeli Basketball Premier League
- Talib Zanna (born 1990) – basketball player in the Israel Basketball Premier League

== Boxing ==
- Dick Tiger (born Richard Ihetu) – former World Boxing Association world middleweight and light-heavyweight champion.
- Hogan Bassey – former World Boxing Association world featherweight champion.
- Ike Ibeabuchi – former World Boxing Council international heavyweight champion
- Samuel Peter – former World Boxing Council world heavyweight champion

== Mixed martial arts ==
- Anthony Njokuani
- Israel Adesanya
- Kamaru Usman
- Muhammed Lawal – former Strikeforce world light-heavyweight champion

== Other ==
- Beauty Otuedo – sprint canoeist
