= Igho Otegheri =

Nigerian footballer

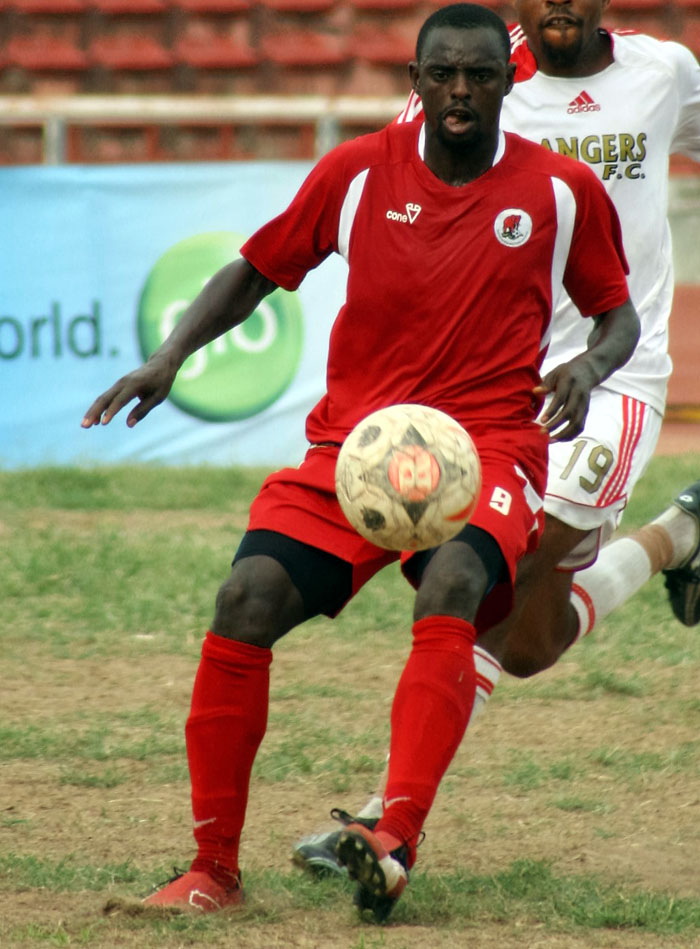
- Ighoteguonor Otegheri, 2010

Personal information
- Full name: Ighoteguonor Otegheri
- Date of birth: November 20, 1983 (age 42)
- Place of birth: Calabar, Nigeria
- Height: 1.83 m (6 ft 0 in)
- Position: Striker

Team information
- Current team: Heartland F.C.
- Number: 13

Senior career*
Years	Team	Apps	(Gls)
2003	Wikki Tourists	33	(16)
2004–2006	Enugu Rangers	61	(26)
2007	Dolphins F.C.	33	(16)
2008–	Heartland F.C.	32	(14)

International career
2002–2004	Nigeria	3	(0)
- * Club domestic league appearances and goals

Igho Otegheri (born November 20, 1983, in Nigeria) is a Nigerian football striker. He played for Heartland F.C.

== Career ==
Otegheri began his career with Wikki Tourists in 2004 before transferring to Enugu Rangers for two years. He then signed with Dolphins F.C. in 2007.

Otegheri later joined Heartland F.C., where he played until 22 January 2009 when he moved to Beitar Jerusalem F.C. with compatriot Anderson West. He was released from his contract at 1 February 2009 and turned back to Heartland F.C.

== International ==
Otegheri was a member of the Super Eagles, his debut coming on 2 February 2003 in a match against Costa Rica

== Personal life ==
He married Nigerian track and field athlete Blessing Okagbare in September 2014.
