= Sergey Polynskiy =

Russian cyclist

Personal information
- Full name: Sergey Polynskiy
- Born: 16 September 1981 (age 45) Ryazan, Russian SFSR
- Height: 1.72 m (5 ft 7 1/2 in)
- Weight: 82 kg (181 lb)

Cycling career
- Sport: Cycling
- Discipline: Track
- Role: Rider
- Rider type: Sprinter

Professional team
- 2012: Petroholding Leningrad

Sergey Polynskiy (born 16 September 1981 in Ryazan) is a Russian professional track cyclist. He won a bronze medal for the Russian home squad in men's team sprint at the first stage of the 2004 UCI World Cup series in Moscow, and later represented his nation Russia at the 2008 Summer Olympics. Polynskiy currently races professionally for Petroholding Leningrad Cycling Team.

Polynskiy qualified for the Russian squad, in two track cycling events at the 2008 Summer Olympics in Beijing by receiving a berth from the UCI Track World Rankings. In the men's team sprint, held on the first day of the track program, Polynskiy and his teammates Denis Dmitriev and Sergey Kucherov battled in an opening heat against the Aussies (led by five-time Olympic veteran Shane Kelly) with a twelfth-place time in 45.964 and an average speed of 59.647 km/h, failing to advance further to the top eight match round. The following day, in the men's keirin, Polynskiy could not ignite a late surge on the final stretch to defeat against three other cyclists Kiyofumi Nagai of Japan, Andrii Vynokurov of Ukraine, and Ricardo Lynch of Jamaica for the semifinal spot in the repechage.

== Career highlights ==
2005

- (bronze) Stage 1, UCI World Cup (Team sprint), Moscow (RUS)

2011

- (gold) Grand Prix von Deutschland im Sprint (Sprint), Germany
- (silver) Russian Championships (Team sprint), Russia
- (bronze) Russian Championships (Keirin), Russia
- (bronze) Russian Championships (Sprint), Russia

2013

- (bronze) Russian Championships (1 km time trial), Moscow (RUS)
