= Athletics at the 2011 All-Africa Games – Women's long jump =

Women's Long Jump Event 2011 By All-Africa Games

The women's long jump event at the 2011 All-Africa Games was held on 14 September.

== Results ==
Rank	Athlete	Nationality	#1	#2	#3	#4	#5	#6	Result	Notes
1st place, gold medalist(s)	Blessing Okagbare	Nigeria	6.26	6.31	–	6.50w	–	–	6.50w	
2nd place, silver medalist(s)	Sarah Ngo Ngoa	Cameroon	5.72	5.96	6.11	6.04	6.46w	6.11	6.46w	
3rd place, bronze medalist(s)	Roumeissa Belabiod	Algeria	4.07	5.98	6.02	6.46	5.77	x	6.46	
4	Sandrine Mbumi	Cameroon	6.19	6.04	5.97	6.31	6.35w	6.17	6.35w	
5	Yetsa Tuakli-Wosornu	Ghana	6.19	6.29w	x	6.24	x	x	6.29w	
6	Kéné Ndoye	Senegal	6.18	6.19	–	6.19	–	–	6.19	
7	Comfort Onyali	Nigeria	5.63	6.18w	5.96	6.00	5.98	5.96	6.18w	
8	Cissé Tounkara	Mali	x	5.72w	x	x	5.28	5.41	5.72w	
9	Lissa Labiche	Seychelles	5.70w	5.62	x				5.70w	
10	Sonia Chembene	Mozambique	5.00	x	5.41				5.41	
