= 2010 African Championships in Athletics – Women's long jump =

The women's long jump at the 2010 African Championships in Athletics was held on July 30.

== Results ==
Rank	Athlete	Nationality	#1	#2	#3	#4	#5	#6	Result	Notes
1st place, gold medalist(s)	Blessing Okagbare	Nigeria	6.55	6.49	–	–	6.62	–	6.62	
2nd place, silver medalist(s)	Comfort Onyali	Nigeria	6.08	6.42	6.31	–	6.31	X	6.42	
3rd place, bronze medalist(s)	Jamaa Chnaik	Morocco	5.60	6.19	6.12	6.30	6.30	6.18	6.30	
4	Yah Koita	Mali	X	6.02	X	6.11	X	X	6.11	
5	Sandrine Mbumi	Cameroon	5.58	5.75	6.05	5.74	X	5.80	6.05	
6	Mariette Mien	Burkina Faso	X	5.24	5.83	X	X	X	5.83	
7	Doyana Jolicoeur	Mauritius	5.56	5.26	5.38	5.67	5.21	4.98	5.67	
8	Janet Boniface	Seychelles	X	5.47	5.65	5.29	5.47	5.48	5.65	(w)
9	Regina Malai Mulatya	Kenya	5.52	5.42	4.99				5.52	
10	Zeiba Zeine	Ethiopia	4.76	5.12	4.93				5.12	
11	Beatrice Gyaman	Ghana	X	4.93	5.09				5.09	
12	Rose Moraa	Kenya	X	5.05	4.95				5.05	
13	Cherotich Koech	Kenya	4.30	X	4.94				4.94	
14	Netsanet Haddis	Ethiopia	X	4.45	4.92				4.92	
