= Cycling at the 2008 Summer Olympics – Men's keirin =

Men's Keirin at the Games of the XXIX Olympiad
- Olympic Track cycling
- Venue: Laoshan Velodrome
- Dates: August 16
- Competitors: 25 from 17 nations

Medalists
1st place, gold medalist(s)		Chris Hoy	Great Britain
2nd place, silver medalist(s)		Ross Edgar	Great Britain
3rd place, bronze medalist(s)		Kiyofumi Nagai	Japan

The men's Keirin at the 2008 Summer Olympics took place on August 16 at the Laoshan Velodrome.

This track cycling event consisted of multiple rounds. In each race, the four to seven cyclists in the heat covered 8 laps of the track. The first 5.5 laps were behind a motorized pacer called a derny, which gradually increased speed up to 50 km/h (31 mph; 14 m/s). The derny then left the track and the cyclists then raced the final 2 1/2 laps to the finish.

In the first round, four heats were held. The top two cyclists in each heat advanced to the semifinals, with the rest of the cyclists competing again in the repechage. Four of those cyclists advanced from the repechage to the semifinals as well, for a total of 12 semifinalists. They raced again in two semifinals heats. The top three cyclists in each semifinal advanced to the final, while the bottom three competed in the 7th to 12th place classification race.

== Qualification ==
Twenty-five cyclists competed in the Keirin. Chris Hoy (Great Britain) qualified directly by winning the Keirin at the 2008 UCI Track Cycling World Championships. He also won the event at the late 2007 World Cup event in Sydney, affording another position to qualifiers based on Union Cycliste Internationale (UCI) rankings.

== Results ==
REL=Relegated, DNF=Did not finish, DNS=Did not start

=== Preliminaries ===
Heat 1

Rank	Rider	Country
1	Chris Hoy	Great Britain
2	Carsten Bergemann	Germany
3	Toshiaki Fushimi	Japan
4	Grégory Baugé	France
5	Kamil Kuczyński	Poland
6	Denis Dmitriev	Russia

Heat 2

Rank	Rider	Country
1	Azizulhasni Awang	Malaysia
2	Shane Kelly	Australia
3	Teun Mulder	Netherlands
4	Andrii Vynokurov	Ukraine
5	Sergey Polynskiy	Russia
6	Feng Yong	China

Heat 3

Rank	Rider	Country
1	Ross Edgar	Great Britain
2	Josiah Ng	Malaysia
3	Kiyofumi Nagai	Japan
4	Denis Špička	Czech Republic
5	Christos Volikakis	Greece
REL	Roberto Chiappa	Italy

Heat 4

Rank	Rider	Country
1	Ryan Bayley	Australia
2	Theo Bos	Netherlands
3	Giddeon Massie	United States
4	Arnaud Tournant	France
5	Athanasios Mantzouranis	Greece
6	Ricardo Lynch	Jamaica
7	Maximilian Levy	Germany

=== Repechage ===
Heat 1

Rank	Rider	Country
1	Arnaud Tournant	France
2	Christos Volikakis	Greece
3	Feng Yong	China
4	Toshiaki Fushimi	Japan

Heat 2

Rank	Rider	Country
1	Kamil Kuczyński	Poland
2	Denis Špička	Czech Republic
3	Denis Dmitriev	Russia
REL	Teun Mulder	Netherlands

Heat 3

Rank	Rider	Country
1	Kiyofumi Nagai	Japan
2	Andrii Vynokurov	Ukraine
3	Ricardo Lynch	Jamaica
4	Sergey Polynskiy	Russia

Heat 4

Rank	Rider	Country
1	Grégory Baugé	France
2	Maximilian Levy	Germany
3	Athanasios Mantzouranis	Greece
4	Giddeon Massie	United States
5	Roberto Chiappa	Italy

=== Semifinals ===
Heat 1

Rank	Rider	Country
1	Chris Hoy	Great Britain
2	Shane Kelly	Australia
3	Arnaud Tournant	France
4	Josiah Ng	Malaysia
5	Grégory Baugé	France
6	Ryan Bayley	Australia

Heat 2

Rank	Rider	Country
1	Ross Edgar	Great Britain
2	Kiyofumi Nagai	Japan
3	Carsten Bergemann	Germany
4	Azizulhasni Awang	Malaysia
DNF	Theo Bos	Netherlands
DNF	Kamil Kuczyński	Poland

=== Finals ===
Classification race

Rank	Rider	Country
7	Grégory Baugé	France
8	Ryan Bayley	Australia
9	Josiah Ng	Malaysia
10	Azizulhasni Awang	Malaysia
11	Kamil Kuczyński	Poland
DNS	Theo Bos	Netherlands

Medals race

Rank	Rider	Country
1	Chris Hoy	Great Britain
1	Ross Edgar	Great Britain
1	Kiyofumi Nagai	Japan
4	Shane Kelly	Australia
5	Carsten Bergemann	Germany
6	Arnaud Tournant	France
