= Blessing Okagbare =

Nigerian sprinter and long jumper (born 1988)

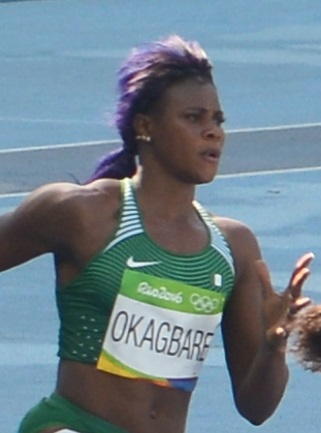
- Okagbare during the 200 m heat at the 2016 Rio Olympics

Personal information
- Born: 9 October 1988 (age 38) Sapele, Delta State, Nigeria
- Years active: 2007–present
- Height: 1.81 m (5 ft 11 in)
- Weight: 71 kg (157 lb)

Sport
- Country: Nigeria
- Sport: Athletics
- Events: Long jump, sprints

Achievements and titles
- Personal bests: 100 m: 10.79 (2013, NR); 200 m: 22.04 (2018, AR); Long jump: 7.00 m (2013)
Medal record
Women's athletics
Representing Nigeria
Olympic Games
Silver medal – second place	2008 Beijing	Long jump
World Championships
Silver medal – second place	2013 Moscow	Long jump
Bronze medal – third place	2013 Moscow	200 m
Commonwealth Games
Gold medal – first place	2014 Glasgow	100 m
Gold medal – first place	2014 Glasgow	200 m
Silver medal – second place	2014 Glasgow	4×100 m
Bronze medal – third place	2018 Gold Coast	4×100 m
All-Africa Games
Gold medal – first place	2011 Maputo	Long jump
Gold medal – first place	2011 Maputo	4×100 m
Gold medal – first place	2015 Brazzaville	4×100 m
Silver medal – second place	2007 Algiers	Long jump
Silver medal – second place	2011 Maputo	100 m
African Championships
Gold medal – first place	2010 Nairobi	100 m
Gold medal – first place	2010 Nairobi	Long jump
Gold medal – first place	2010 Nairobi	4×100 m
Gold medal – first place	2014 Marrakesh	100 m
Gold medal – first place	2014 Marrakesh	4×100 m
Gold medal – first place	2018 Asaba	4×100 m
Silver medal – second place	2012 Porto-Novo	100 m
World Relays
Gold medal – first place	2015 Nassau	4×200 m
Continental Cup
Bronze medal – third place	2010 Split	100 m

Blessing Oghnewresem Okagbare-Otegheri (née Okagbare, born 9 October 1988) is a former Nigerian track and field athlete who specialized in long jump and sprints. She is an Olympic and World Championships medallist in the long jump and a world medalist in the 200 metres. Okagbare also holds the women's 100 metres Commonwealth Games record at 10.85 seconds.

Her 100 m best of 10.79 made her the African record holder for the event until it was eclipsed by Murielle Ahouré in 2016. On June 17, 2021, Okagbare ran a wind-aided 10.63 100 m. She was the African record holder over the 200 m with a time of 22.04 seconds in 2018, thus making her the second-fastest African female athlete over the distance behind Christine Mboma, who ran an African record of 21.78 s in 2021. Okagbare was the African 100 m and long jump champion in 2010. She has also won medals at the All-Africa Games, IAAF Continental Cup and World Relays.

In 2022 Okagbare was issued with an eleven-year competition ban backdated to July 2021 for multiple anti-doping rule violations.

== Career ==
=== Early life ===
Of Urhobo heritage, Okagbare was born in Sapele, Delta, in Nigeria. Given her athletic physique, teachers and family encouraged her to take up sports. Initially, she played football as a teenager at her high school and later, in 2004, she began to take an interest in track and field. She participated in several disciplines early on, competing in the long jump, triple jump and high jump events at the Nigerian school championships and winning a medal in each. On the senior national stage, she was a triple jump bronze medalist at the 2004 Nigerian National Sports Festival. Okagbare's first international outing came at the 2006 World Junior Championships in Athletics, where she performed in the qualifying rounds of both the long and triple jump competitions.

In May 2007, at the All-Africa Games trials in Lagos, she established a Nigerian record of 14.13 meters in the triple jump. At the 2007 All-Africa Games she won the silver medal in the long jump and finished fourth in the triple jump. In the latter competition her Nigerian record was beaten by Chinonye Ohadugha, who jumped 14.21 meters.

=== Olympic and African medals ===
As a 19-year-old, she won a silver medal in the women's long jump event at the 2008 Summer Olympics in Beijing. She was selected to compete at the 2009 World Championships in Athletics but did not start either the 100 m or long jump.

Okagbare scored a 100 m/long jump double at the NCAA Women's Outdoor Track and Field Championship for University of Texas at El Paso, completing an undefeated collegiate streak for the UTEP Miners that year. She won the Nigerian 100 m title in 2010, running a time of 11.04 seconds, and stated that she was opting out of the long jump in order to save herself for the upcoming African championships.

At the African Championships in 2010, she won gold in the long jump again with a distance of 6.62 m while her compatriot Comfort Onyali took silver. Okagbare also won gold in the 100 m distance with a run of 11.03 s flat, while Gabon's Ruddy Zang Milama and compatriot Oludamola Osayomi won silver and bronze with runs of 11.15 s and 11.22 s respectively. She won her third gold at the end of the championship as part of the Nigerian 4×100 m women's relay team. The team of Okagbare, Osayomi, Lawretta Ozoh and Agnes Osazuwa set a new championship record with a run of 43.43 s, more than a full second ahead of the silver-winning Cameroonian quartet.

In 2011, Okagbare continued to build on her earlier endeavours by establishing herself as a 100 m runner. At the 2011 World Championships in Daegu, Okagbare placed fifth in the 100 m final with a run of 11.12 s. However, she did not make it to the final of the long jump as her best jump of 6.36 m was not enough to get her out of her qualifying group. She concluded her 2011 season by winning three medals at the All Africa Games in Maputo, Mozambique. She won silver in the 100 m behind compatriot Oludamola Osayomi with a run of 11.01 s and gold in the long jump with a jump of 6.50 m. She was part of the Nigerian quartet that won gold in the 4 × 100 m with a time of 43.34.

2012 was a busy year for Okagbare. She jumped 6.97 m in the long jump in Calabar during the Nigerian championship. She won new continental medals at the 2012 African Championships in Porto-Novo. In the 100 m, she was beaten to silver by Zang Milama, while in the long jump, she claimed gold with a jump of 6.96 m.

=== London 2012 and 2013 World Championships ===
At London 2012, Okagbare participated in her second Olympic Games. Going into the Olympics, she had run several fast 100 m races, and there was much anticipation and hope of a medal. However, the 2012 Olympics were not as successful for Okagbare as her 2008 outing. She established a new personal best of 10.92 s in the 100 m semi-final but placed eighth in the final with a run of 11.01 s.

2013 would prove to be a breakthrough year for Okagbare. In April 2013, in Walnut, California, Blessing Okagbare set a personal record in the 200 m with a time of 22.31 s. Then, in July, she improved her personal best in the long jump with successive jumps of 6.98 m at the Athletissima meet in Lausanne and 7.00 m during the Monaco Herculis meet. On 27 July 2013, at the London Anniversary Games, Okagbare set a new African record of 10.86 s in her 100 m race. She won the final about an hour later, setting a new African record of 10.79, in a race where she beat reigning 100 m Olympic gold medalist Shelly-Ann Fraser-Pryce. Okagbare's record eclipsed the existing record by compatriot Glory Alozie of 10.90 s, which had stood since 1998.

At the 2013 World Championships in Moscow, Okagbare won the silver medal in the long jump. Her jump of 6.99 m put her in second place behind Brittney Reese of the United States by only two centimeters. In the 100 m final, she placed sixth with a run of 11.04 s and also placed third in the 200 m race.

=== 2014 Commonwealth Games ===
Okagbare participated in both the 100m and 200m races. She made it through to the finals of the 100m and won with a time of 10.85 seconds, breaking the games record of 10.91 seconds set by Debbie Ferguson-McKenzie 12 years earlier at the 2002 Commonwealth Games in Manchester. Okagbare also won the gold medal in the 200, with a time of 22.25 seconds. In doing so, she became the fourth woman to win the 100m and 200m double at the Commonwealth Games.

=== 2015 World Relays and African Games ===
She ran the lead-off leg in the 4 × 200 m at the 2015 World Relays. The team consisting of Okagbare, Regina George, Dominique Duncan and Christy Udoh won the race and set an African Record in the process. She did not appear in the 200 meters at the IAAF World Championships or the All Africa Games due to a hamstring injury she sustained while finishing last in the final of the 100 meters at the World Championships. At the end of the season, she did participate in the IAAF Diamond League meet, the Weltklasse Zürich in Zurich, finishing second in the 100 meters. The Director General of Nigeria's National Sports Commission Al Hassan Yakmu was angered by the perceived snub:

"I was shocked when I saw Okagbare competing in the Diamond League in Zurich last Thursday. I was wondering if it was the same Okagbare who refused to compete for Nigeria in the 200m event at the IAAF World Championship in Beijing. She even opted out of Team Nigeria for the All-Africa Games in Congo. Why? I have said it times without number that any athlete who feels too big to compete for Nigeria in the All-Africa Games should not bother about the Rio 2016 Olympic Games. No athlete is bigger than Nigeria.

— Al Hassan Yakmu

It was initially reported that Okagbare was banned from representing Nigeria at the 2016 Olympics. The Athletics Federation of Nigeria eventually refuted the claim. Though she opted out of the individual events at the All-Africa Games, she did run in the 4 × 100 m relay and help the Nigerian team (Cecilia Francis, Okagbare, Ngozi Onwumere and Lawretta Ozoh) secure the gold medal.

=== 2016 Rio Olympics ===
Blessing had a disappointing show at the 2016 Rio Olympics, as she finished without a single medal. She never made it to the final but was ranked 3rd in the 100m semifinal finishing at 11.09s, and ranked 8th with her teammates in the final of the 4 × 100 m relay.

=== 2020 Tokyo Olympics ===
At the 2020 Tokyo Olympics, Okagbare won her first round heat in the 100 metres with a time of 11.05. She was subsequently suspended on 31 July 2021 after failing a drug test taken on 19 July 2021, which tested positive for human growth hormone. In February 2022, Okagbare was issued with a ten-year ban backdated to July 2021 by the Athletics Integrity Unit based on presence and use of multiple banned substances (five years) which was doubled due to her refusal to cooperate with the investigation. In June 2022, her ban was extended to 11 years for additional anti-doping rule violations.

== Personal life ==
In September 2014, she married Nigerian footballer Igho Otegheri.

== Statistics ==
=== Personal bests ===
- 60 metres – 7.10 (Fayetteville 2021)
- 100 metres – 10.79 (+1.1 m/s, London 2013) NR
- 200 metres – 22.04 (Abilene 2018)
- Long jump – 7.00 m (22 ft 11 1/2 in) (Monaco 2013)
- Triple jump – 14.13 m (46 ft 4 1/4 in) (Lagos 2007) AU20R

Her mark of 14.13 m in the triple jump is the African under-20 record. Her best of 10.79 in the 100 m was the African senior record from 27 July 2013 to 11 June 2016, when it was beaten by Ivorian athlete Murielle Ahouré.

=== International competitions ===
Representing Nigeria
Year	Competition	Venue	Position	Event	Time
2006	World Junior Championships	Beijing, China	6th (q)	Long jump	5.97 m
2006	World Junior Championships	Beijing, China	8th (q)	Triple jump	12.81 m
2007	All-Africa Games	Algiers, Algeria	2nd	Long jump	6.46 m
2007	All-Africa Games	Algiers, Algeria	4th	Triple jump	13.77 m
2008	Olympic Games	Beijing, China	2nd	Long jump	6.91 m
2010	African Championships	Nairobi, Kenya	1st	100 m	11.03
2010	African Championships	Nairobi, Kenya	1st	Long jump	6.62 m
2010	African Championships	Nairobi, Kenya	1st	4 × 100 m relay	43.45 CR
2010	Continental Cup	Split, Croatia	3rd	100 m	11.14
2010	Continental Cup	Split, Croatia	3rd	4 × 100 m relay	43.88
2011	World Championships	Daegu, South Korea	5th	100 m	11.12
2011	World Championships	Daegu, South Korea	9th (q)	Long jump	6.36 m
2011	World Championships	Daegu, South Korea	6th	4 × 100 m relay	42.93
2011	All-Africa Games	Maputo, Mozambique	2nd	100 m	11.01 w
2011	All-Africa Games	Maputo, Mozambique	1st	Long jump	6.50 m w
2011	All-Africa Games	Maputo, Mozambique	1st	4 × 100 m relay	43.34
2012	African Championships	Porto-Novo, Benin	2nd	100 m	11.18
2012	African Championships	Porto-Novo, Benin	1st	Long jump	6.96 m
2012	Olympic Games	London, United Kingdom	8th	100 m	11.01
2012	Olympic Games	London, United Kingdom	7th (q)	Long jump	6.34 m
2012	Olympic Games	London, United Kingdom	4th	4 × 100 m relay	42.64
2013	World Championships	Moscow, Russia	6th	100 m	11.04
2013	World Championships	Moscow, Russia	3rd	200 m	22.32
2013	World Championships	Moscow, Russia	2nd	Long jump	6.99 m
2014	World Relays	Nassau, Bahamas	4th	4 × 100 m relay	42.67
2014	Commonwealth Games	Glasgow, United Kingdom	1st	100 m	10.85 GR
2014	Commonwealth Games	Glasgow, United Kingdom	1st	200 m	22.25
2014	Commonwealth Games	Glasgow, United Kingdom	2nd	4 × 100 m relay	42.92
2014	African Championships	Marrakesh, Morocco	1st	100 m	11.00
2014	African Championships	Marrakesh, Morocco	1st	4 × 100 m relay	43.56
2015	World Relays	Nassau, Bahamas	7th	4 × 100 m relay	42.99
2015	World Relays	Nassau, Bahamas	1st	4 × 200 m relay	1:30.52
2015	World Championships	Beijing, China	8th	100 m	11.02
2015	African Games	Brazzaville, Republic of the Congo	1st	4 × 100 m relay	43.10
2016	Olympic Games	Rio de Janeiro, Brazil	3rd (sf)	100 m	11.09
2016	Olympic Games	Rio de Janeiro, Brazil	5th (sf)	200 m	22.69
2016	Olympic Games	Rio de Janeiro, Brazil	8th	4 × 100 m relay	43.21
2017	World Championships	London, United Kingdom	4th (sf)	100 m	11.08
2017	World Championships	London, United Kingdom	8th	Long jump	6.55 m
2018	Commonwealth Games	Gold Coast, Australia	3rd	4 × 100 m relay	42.75
2018	African Championships	Asaba, Nigeria	1st	4 × 100 m relay	43.77
2019	African Games	Rabat, Morocco	4th (h)	100 m	11.53^{1}
2019	African Games	Rabat, Morocco	1st (h)	4 × 100 m relay	43.49
2019	World Championships	Doha, Qatar	–	200 m	DQ

^{1}Disqualified in the semifinal

=== Circuit wins ===
100 m

- Meeting Sport Solidarietà: 2010
- London Grand Prix: 2012, 2013
- Herculis: 2012
- IAAF World Challenge Beijing: 2013
- Jamaica International Invitational: 2014
- Shanghai Golden Grand Prix: 2015
- Meeting de Atletismo Madrid: 2016
- Gyulai István Memorial: 2016, 2017
- Marseille Meeting International: 2017
- Hanžeković Memorial: 2017
- Texas Relays: 2018

200 m

- Mt. SAC Relays: 2013
- British Grand Prix: 2013
- Shanghai Golden Grand Prix: 2014
- Meeting Areva: 2014
- Michael Johnson Classic: 2016
- Folksam Grand Prix: 2016
- KBC Night of Athletics: 2016

Long jump

- Gyulai István Memorial: 2011
- Athletissima: 2013
- Herculis: 2013
- Shanghai Golden Grand Prix: 2014

=== National and NCAA titles ===
- Nigerian Athletics Championships
  - 100 metres: 2009, 2010, 2011, 2012, 2013, 2014, 2016
  - 200 metres: 2013, 2014, 2016
  - Long jump: 2007, 2008, 2009, 2011, 2012, 2013
  - Triple jump: 2007, 2008
- NCAA Women's Division I Outdoor Track and Field Championships
  - 100 metres: 2010
  - Long jump: 2010
- NCAA Women's Division I Indoor Track and Field Championships
  - 60 metres: 2010

=== Seasonal bests ===
Year	100 metres	200 metres	Long jump	Triple jump
2021	10.90	22.59		
2020	—N/a			
2019	11.04	22.05		
2018	10.90	22.04		
2017	10.99	22.87	6.77	
2016	11.02	22.58	6.73	
2015	10.80	22.67	6.66	
2014	10.85	22.23	6.86	
2013	10.79	22.31	7.00	
2012	10.92	22.63	6.97	
2011	11.08	22.94	6.78	
2010	11.00	22.71	6.88	12.80
2009	11.16		6.73	13.59
2008		23.76	6.91	14.07
2007			6.51	14.13
2006			6.16	13.38

== See also ==
- 2018 in 100 meters
- List of Olympic medalists in athletics (women)
- List of Commonwealth Games medalists in athletics (women)
- List of World Championships in Athletics medalists (women)
- List of African Games medalists in athletics (women)
- List of champions of the African Championships in Athletics
- List of 2008 Summer Olympics medal winners
- List of Nigerian sportspeople
- 200 meters at the World Championships in Athletics
- Long jump at the Olympics

Records
Preceded by Chioma Ajunwa	Women's 100 m African Record Holder; 27 July 2013 – 11 June 2016	Succeeded by Murielle Ahouré
Preceded by Evette de Klerk	Women's 200 m African Record Holder; 24 March 2018–	Succeeded by Incumbent
