= Zara Northover =

Jamaican shot putter (born 1984)

Personal information
- Full name: Zara Georgia Northover
- Born: 6 March 1984 (age 42) Elmont, New York, U.S.
- Height: 165 cm (5 ft 5 in)
- Website: zaranorthover.com

Sport
- Country: Jamaica
- Sport: Athletics
- Event: Shot put
Medal record
Women's athletics
Representing Jamaica
Central American and Caribbean Games
Silver medal – second place	2010 Mayagüez	Shot put

Zara Georgia Northover (born 6 March 1984) is a Jamaican shot putter. Northover has dual citizenship in the United States and Jamaica, and competed for Jamaica at the 2008 Summer Olympics.

Northover attended Northeastern University in Boston, Massachusetts, where she competed on the women's track and field team, and graduated in 2007 with a bachelor's degree in communications and a minor in political science. As a senior, Northover was named Colonial Athletic Association Field Athlete of the Year after winning the shot put, discus and hammer and placing seventh in the javelin, helping lead Northeastern to their first CAA title in any sport. Her throw at the Eastern College Athletic Conference Championship during the 2007 outdoor season set both Northeastern and ECAC records. Northover was a five-time NCAA Championship qualifier and had the best national finish of her career in her final season, placing 10th at the NCAA Championship during the 2007 outdoor season, and was nominated for the NCAA Woman of the Year Award.

Internationally, she finished fifth at the 2006 Central American and Caribbean Games. On 8 June 2008, Northover won the Island Games in Uniondale, New York, with a throw of 17.56 meters, allowing her to compete in the Jamaican Olympic Trials in Kingston, Jamaica. She won the shot put at the Olympic Trials on 28 June 2008, with a throw of 16.78 meters. She was officially selected to represent Jamaica in Beijing by the Jamaica Amateur Athletic Association on 8 July 2008, becoming the first Northeastern women's athlete to compete in a Summer Olympics.
