= Jevon Atkinson =

Jamaican swimmer (born 1984)

Personal information
- Nationality: Jamaica
- Born: 3 April 1984 (age 42)

Sport
- Sport: Swimming
- Strokes: Freestyle

Jevon Atkinson (born 3 April 1984) is a Jamaican swimmer and Olympian.

He competed at the 2008 Olympics, finishing 45th in the Men's 50 free.

As of October 2008, he holds the Jamaican record in the 50 free.

== See also ==
- List of Jamaican records in swimming
