= Praise Onubiyi =

Nigerian footballer

Praise Onubiye
Personal information
- Full name: Praise Otito Onibiyi
- Date of birth: 10 August 1989 (age 37)
- Place of birth: Jos, Nigeria
- Height: 1.87 m (6 ft 1 1/2 in)
- Position: Forward

Senior career*
Years	Team	Apps	(Gls)
2005–2006	Puma FC	20	(9)
2006–2008	Abuja FC	27	(14)
2008–2009	→ FC Oulu (loan)	8	(4)
2009–2010	MKS Kutno	9	(0)
2010	Kasztelan Sierpc		
2013–2014	FK Zenit Caslav	6	(2)
- * Club domestic league appearances and goals as of 26 October 2014

Praise Onubiyi (born 10 August 1989) is a Nigerian footballer who played as a forward.

Onubiyi is a striker known for his speed, power and strength in the air. He began his career at youth level with Puma FC in Abuja before playing two seasons with Abuja FC in the second division in Nigeria. At that point in time he was invited for trials in Italy which were ultimately unsuccessful. In 2009, he went for trials in Finland and then Poland, eventually signing for Polish club MKS Kutno. Onubiyi then moved to FK Zenit Caslav where he made two goals in six appearances.
