= Johnson Akuchie =

Nigerian Association Football Forward

Personal information
- Full name: Johnson Akuchie
- Date of birth: 6 January 1990 (age 36)
- Place of birth: Lagos, Nigeria
- Position: Striker

Team information
- Current team: Atlético Maronense

Senior career*
Years	Team	Apps	(Gls)
2009–2010	Atlético Maronense		
2011	Flandria		(2)
2011–	Atlético Maronense		
- * Club domestic league appearances and goals

Johnson Akuchie (born January 6, 1990) is a Nigerian association football forward currently playing for Flandria of the Primera B Metropolitana in Argentina.
