= Kiyofumi Nagai =

Japanese cyclist (born 1983)

Personal information
- Full name: Kiyofumi Nagai
- Born: May 18, 1983 (age 43)

Cycling career
- Sport: Cycling
- Discipline: Track
- Role: Rider
- Rider type: Sprinter
Medal record
Men's track cycling
Representing Japan
Olympic Games
| Bronze medal – third place | 2008 Beijing | Keirin |

Kiyofumi Nagai (永井 清史, Nagai Kiyofumi) (born 18 May 1983) is a track cyclist from Japan. He won a bronze medal in the Keirin race at the 2008 Olympic Games.
